= Nishaan =

Sacred symbol of the Ravidassia religion

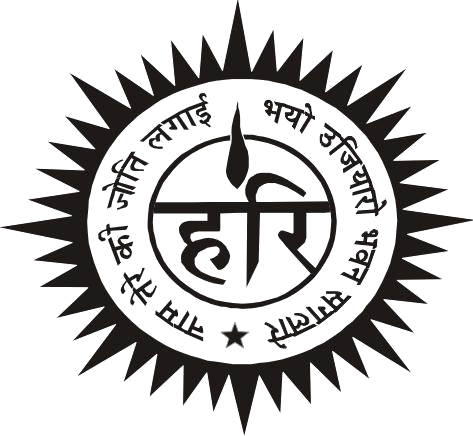
Harr Nishaan (Religious Symbol) of Ravidassia Religion

Har Nishaan (हरि/ਹਰਿ) or Nishaan Sahib is a sacred symbol of the Ravidassia religion. The Har nishan is found atop the Ravidassias Bhawans or on the flag. The Har Nishaan is changed every year on the auspicious day of Guru Ravidass Jayanti. The Ravidassias, especially of Punjab, have hoist flags with the print of the insignia "Har" atop their religious places, and on vehicles during processions on the occasion of Guru Ravidass' birth anniversaries and other festivities.

Har Nishaan is the Ravidassia religious insignia. Strictly speaking "Nishaan" means "symbol" and is used in the Ravidassia context to mean the mantras passed down by the saints. This insignia is also known as the "Koumi Nishan" (Religious Symbol) of the Ravidassia religion. Both of these words, Har or Saunh, are directly or indirectly meant for meditation or reciting Ravidasia hymns. As downtrodden people, the Dalits were neither allowed to be educated nor could they afford to be so. The Guru Raidas spoke and communicated in the local dialect. This enabled the Dalits to enjoy and progress in understanding and communicating their philosophy. The Ravidassia Guru's name is Ravi, meaning sun. Har means Supreme Being. The universe is illuminated due to the sun; otherwise, it would be in darkness. The second half of his name is Das, meaning "servant," therefore the Satguru of the Ravidassia sect is the "Servant of Illumination." Har Nishaan can also be found on the first and fourth pages of Amritbani.

== Appearance ==
The explanation of Har Nishan is as follows:

- A larger circle with sunrays (40 rays of sunlight) - The forty rays around the insignia circle signify forty hymns of Guru Ravidass.
- In between the bigger and smaller circles is written a couplet (ਨਾਮ ਤੇਰੇ ਕਿ ਜੋਤੀ ਲਗਾਈ, ਭੇਈਓ ਭੇਈਓ ਭਵਣ ਸਗਲਈ) Naam tere kee jot lagayi, Bhaio Ujiaaro Bhawan saglaare (Your Name is the flame I light; it has illuminated the entire world)
- Star
- Flame - Flame represents the "Naam" (word) that would illuminate the entire world. The sign of flame crosses over into the bigger circle.
- Circle - This circle depicts the whole universe, which is contained and run in God's order.
- Har (" हरि " " ਹਰਿ ") and Flame over it. "Har" represents the very being of Guru Ravidass and his teachings. The insignia Har is chosen after the name of their Guru Ravidas.

== Accepting Hari as a Symbol by Ravidassia Religion ==
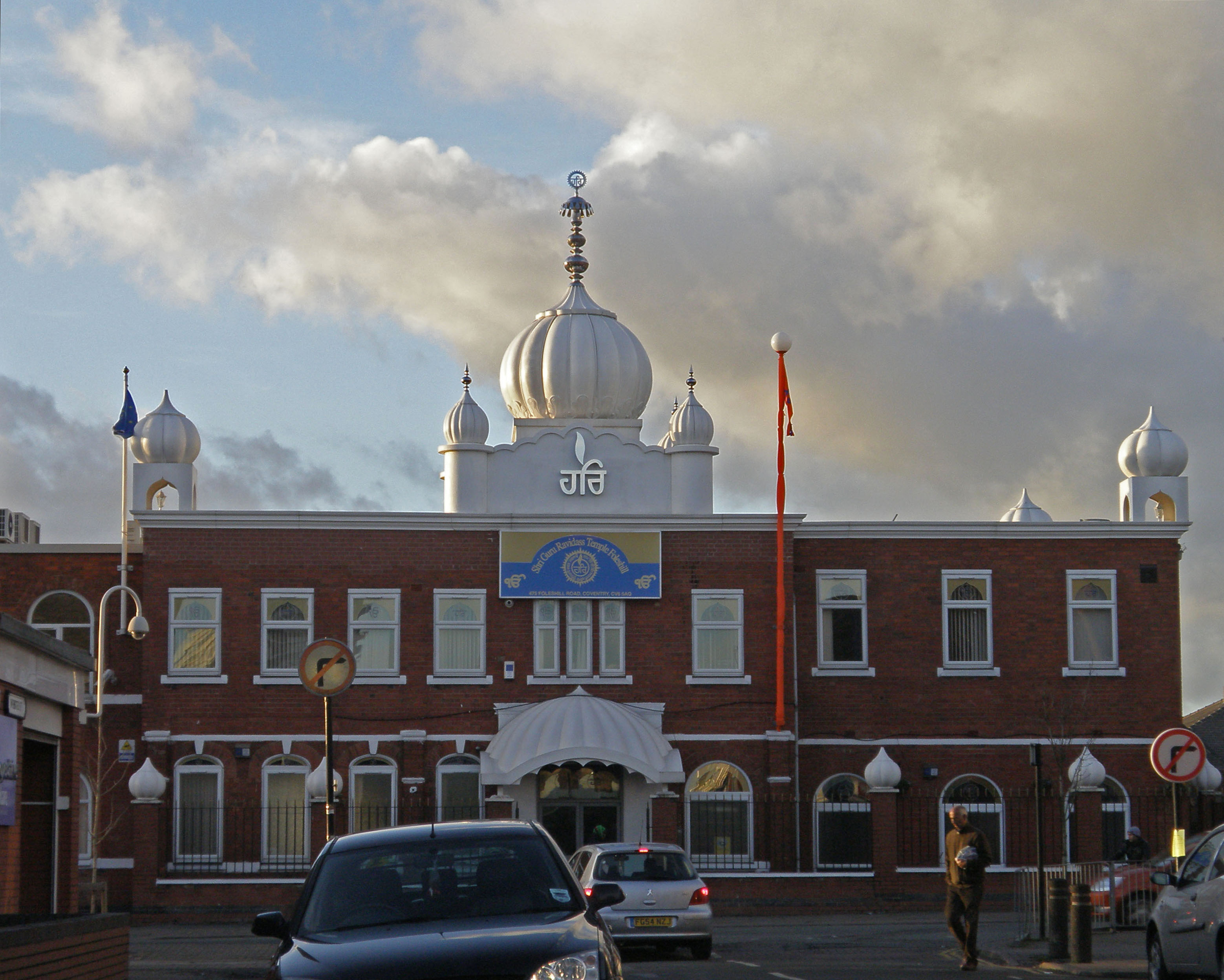
Punjabi Version of Hari Symbol at Shri Ravidass Temple, Foleshill, UK

After the 2009 Vienna attack on the saints of Dera Sach Khand Ballan, there was a clash between fundamentalist Sikhs and the Ravidassia community. This friction subsequently became the reason for the acceptance and origin of the Ravidassia religion. At the birth anniversary celebration of Guru Ravidas in Varanasi, saints of Dera Sachkhand Ballan announced a new religion for Chamar community and they gave it the name Ravidassia Religion. The announcement of a new religion led to a big religious reshuffle in Punjab, and Ravidassia people started replacing Guru Granth Sahib with a new religious book named Amritbani in Guru Ravidass shrines. They also removed Sikh religious symbols and replaced those with a new Ravidassia symbol called Hari.
