= Chambhar =

Indian caste

Regions with significant populations
- Maharashtra, Karnataka, Goa, Punjab, Jammu and Kashmir, Himachal Pradesh, West Bengal

Languages
- Marathi, Konkani, Varhadi dialect, gurmukhi, Indo aryan

Religion
- Hinduism, Ravidasia, Lingayatism, Sikhism, Buddhism

Chambhar is a caste from the Indian state of Maharashtra, and Northern Karnataka. Their traditional occupation was leather work. Historically subject to untouchability, they were traditionally outside the Hindu ritual ranking system of castes known as varna. Castes with similar traditional occupation are found throughout the Indian subcontinent such as Chamar in Northern India, and Mochi in Gujarat.

== History ==
Chambhars have made many contributions in religious and reform movements by Santbai.

=== Maratha era ===
Chambhars as the cobbler of the village formed one of the twelve hereditary village servants under the Bara Balutedar system of Maharashtra. Historically, Chambhars are related to leather work and are landless but gradually their women engaged in midwifery and agricultural labour.

== Culture and society ==
Chambhars in Maharashtra follow hinduism.They also revere Bhakti Sant Rohidas.

== Social status ==
Chambhars enjoyed better position unlike their counterparts of other states, e.g – Chamars, Ravidassias and Ramdasias of North India, Madigas of Andhra Pradesh, etc. Even they were part of mainstream business of local markets and economically well-off.

Currently, Chambhars are in different fields and after the introduction of the reservation policy in India it helped a lot of them to improve their lifestyle.

They fall under Scheduled Caste category in the states of Maharashtra and Karnataka.

== Notables ==
- Milind Kamble, founder of the Dalit Indian Chamber of Commerce and Industry and chairman of Fortune Constructions (Mumbai)
- Vithal Palwankar, cricketer who captained an Indian team at Bombay Quadragular.
- Palwankar Baloo, cricketer of India and leader of Hindu Mahasabha.
- Palwankar Ganpat, Indian cricket player
- Palwankar Shivram, Indian cricket player of Hindu Gymkhana.
- Ramanand Dass, was a leader of the Dera Sach Khand, and a follower of Guru Ravidas.
- Ashok Khade, Chairman of DAS Offshore (Mumbai), one of the biggest oil platform makers of India

== See also ==
- Guru Ravidass
- Utpala dynasty
- Ravidasia
- Adi Jambava
- Ad-Dharmi
- Chamar
- Jatav
- Ramdasia
- Shri Khuralgarh Sahib
- Dera Sach Khand
- Shri Guru Ravidass Janam Asthan
- Shri Guru Ravidas Gurughar
- List of Ravidassia people
