= Begampura (Ravidas) =

Spiritual concept developed by a Bhakti saint

Begampura ("sorrowless city") was a spiritual concept developed by Ravidas, a radical Bhakti saint, which is narrated in one of his hymns. (Note: Also spelt as 'Begumpura'.) The concept was adopted by Sikhism. The idea was of a taxless, property-less, and casteless society in the future, where people formerly divided by caste could have the opportunity to become true friends. However, Ravidas was unable to establish it practically in the real-world, while Guru Nanak had started his own concept of it at Kartarpur.

== Philosophy ==
The hymn is contained in the Amritbani Granth of the Ravidassia religion. Begampura was envisioned as future, casteless utopia where everyone would be in bliss. All divisions of humanity are united into a single group, erasing any divisions. This unity allows the arising of genuine fraternity between people, allowing formerly divided people to have the chance to become real friends, which wouldn't be possible if adhering to the social distances on caste mandated by the Indian society. Furthermore, there are no taxes and property. Ravidas shared the concept in the city of Varanasi, which would have been very provocative, as Varanasi is viewed as one of the most sacred cities in Hinduism. The concept was adopted by Guru Nanak, who developed the idea further. Guru Nanak established the settlement of Kartarpur based on three fundamental principles, his own version of Begampura. Kabir had an analogous concept of Premnagar ("city of love"). Ambedkar would later write literature on themes reminiscent of the concept of Begampura, with his vision of Begampura being realized in the Indian constitution, which was to work toward the future. A similar idea was espoused by Martin Luther King Jr. as the Promised Land.

== Etymology ==
Begampura is derived from be-gahm, meaning "without sorrow" and pura meaning "city".

== Hymns ==
The verses that the concept is derived from is as follows:

Begam pura sahar ko naao,
dukh andohu nahi tihi thaao.
Nan tasvis khiraj na maal.
khauf na khataa na taras javaal.
Ab mohi khub vatan gah pai,
uhaan khair sadaa mere bhai.
Kaim daim sadaa paatisahi,
dom na sem ek so aahi.
[...]
Kahe Ravidas khalaas chamaaraa,
jo ham sahri so mit hamaaraa.

—Ravidas
Translation:

Begampura is the name of the city,
a place without grief or anxiety.
No worry about taxes or property,
no fear of mistakes or downfall.
Now I have found this most excellent place,
where there is lasting safety my companions.
Divine sovereignty is stable and eternal,
none are second or third-all are equal.
[...]
Says Ravidas, the emancipated tanner,
those living in this city are my friends.

—Gill (2024)

== Dera Sachkhand Ballan ==
The concept was adopted and developed by the Dera Sachkhand Ballan, who founded a temple at Varanasi to serve as the location to establish Begumpura in 1965.

== See also ==
- I've Been to the Mountaintop
