= Dera (organisation) =

Socio-religious organization in northern India

A dera (ḍerā) is a type of socio-religious organisation in northern India. Jacob Copeman defines the deras as "monasteries or the extended residential sites of religious leaders; frequently just glossed as sect".

Several deras started out as non-orthodox Sikh sects, and many of them are now centres of distinct non-Sikh religious movements. Many deras have attracted a large number of Dalits (untouchables), who earlier converted to Sikhism to escape Hindu casteism, but felt socially excluded by the Jat Sikh dominated clerical establishment.

== History ==
The word Dera derives from the Persian word Derah or Dirah, which literally means a camp, abode, monastery or convent.

The phenomenon of Dera, as sectarian institution, is not new in Punjab and it is much older than Sikhism. Deras in Punjab, before the Sikhism, belonged to Sufi Pirs, Yogi Naths, and Sants of the Bhakti movement. In Punjab, the popularity of Sufi pirs, sants or their shrines can be seen through their veneration across the communities such as Hindus, Sikhs and Muslims. Shrines of Sufis were known as khanqahs. The major function of khanqah was to provide relief to people of all communities, particularly the lower strata of different communities. Several khanqahs were built and facilities were provided to lower castes of Hindu populace in rural areas. Khanqahs with modest hospitality and generosity offered spiritual guidance, psychological support and counseling that was free and open to all people. By doing so, khanqahs challenged the establishment of stratified social structure either Hindu or Muslim societies. Soon, khanqahs became epicenters of socio-cultural and theological activities of people from all ethnic and religious backgrounds and genders. Sufi shrines of Sakhi Sarvar Sultan, Sheikh Farid, Bulleh Shah, Sheikh Fattha, Khwaja Khizr, the Panj Pir (Five Pirs) were the manifestation of the shared devoutness of Punjabis.

During the lifetime of the Sikh Gurus, several deras were established, many of them by the rival claimants to the Guru Gaddi (Guru-seat, the throne of the Sikh gurus). These deras included those of the Udasis, the Minas, the Dhirmalias, the Ramraiyas, the Handalis, and the Massandis. In 1675, Ram Rai established his dera on land alloted to him by Raja Fateh Shah of Garhwal, who was ordered to do so by Aurangzeb. This dera would be the origin of the settlement of Dehradun. During the consolidation of the Sikh religion, several more deras cropped up. These included the deras of Bandai Khalsa (a sect who proclaimed Jathedar Banda Singh Bahadur as the 11th guru), Nanakpanthis, Sewapanthis, Bhaktpanthi, Suthrashahi, Gulabdasis, Nirmalas and the Nihangs.

19th century onwards, several more deras came into being. The distinguishing characteristic of these new deras was that they acted as centres of Dalit mobilisation. The majority of the followers of these deras were people of Dalit background, who had embraced Sikhism to escape the oppressive Hindu caste system. However, they continued to experience social exclusion in the caste hierarchy of the Sikh society, which pushed them towards the deras and other organisations that promise social equality. The increasing politicisation of the Sikh institutions—the Akal Takht and the Shiromani Gurdwara Prabandhak Committee (SGPC) - and their domination by Jat Sikhs has driven a large number of people to the deras as well. The affluent Dalits among the Punjabi diaspora have also contributed to the growth of the deras.

== Major deras ==
According to a 2006–2007 study, there were more than 9,000 deras in the rural areas of Indian Punjab, including both those belonging to mainstream Sikhism and those outside of it. A number of deras are also located in the neighbouring Indian states of Haryana, Rajasthan and Uttar Pradesh.

=== Mainstream Sikh deras ===
The mainstream Sikh deras strictly observe the Rehat Maryada (Sikh code of conduct). The majority of their followers and jathedars are from the Jat Sikh community. The jathedars of these deras are rarely non-Jat, and never a Dalit. However, there are several Dalit sewadars, granthis, ragis, and kirtan performers in these deras.

Some of the prominent mainstream Sikh deras include those of:

- Damdami Taksal–led Sant Samaj
- Dera Nanaksar
- Sant Ajit Singh Hansali at Hansali Sahib
- Sant Daya Singh Sursingh Wale
- Sant Sewa Singh Rampur Khera
- Parmeshwar Dwar Gurmat Prachar Sewa Mission
- Dera Baba Rumi Wala (Bhucho Kalan)

=== Non-mainstream deras ===
Deras outside the mainstream of Sikihism do not abide by the Sikh Rehyat Maryada. Along with the Sikh gurbani, they also recite non-Sikh texts, and some of them also indulge in idol worship, which is forbidden in Sikhism. Unlike the mainstream Sikh deras, where the holy book Guru Granth Sahib is considered as the only and final guru, the non-mainstream Sikh deras practice devotion towards a contemporary human guru.

Some of the major non-mainstream Sikh deras include:

- Radha Soami Satsang Beas (Dera Beas)
- Dera Sacha Sauda
- Sant Nirankari Mission
- Namdharis
- Bhaniarawala Dera
- Dera Baba Bhuman Shah (Sanghar Sadha)
- Ravidasis (including Dera Sach Khand Ballan)
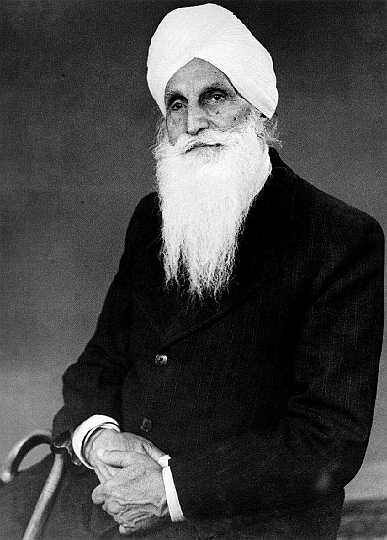
Baba Sawan Singh of Radha Soami Satsang Beas

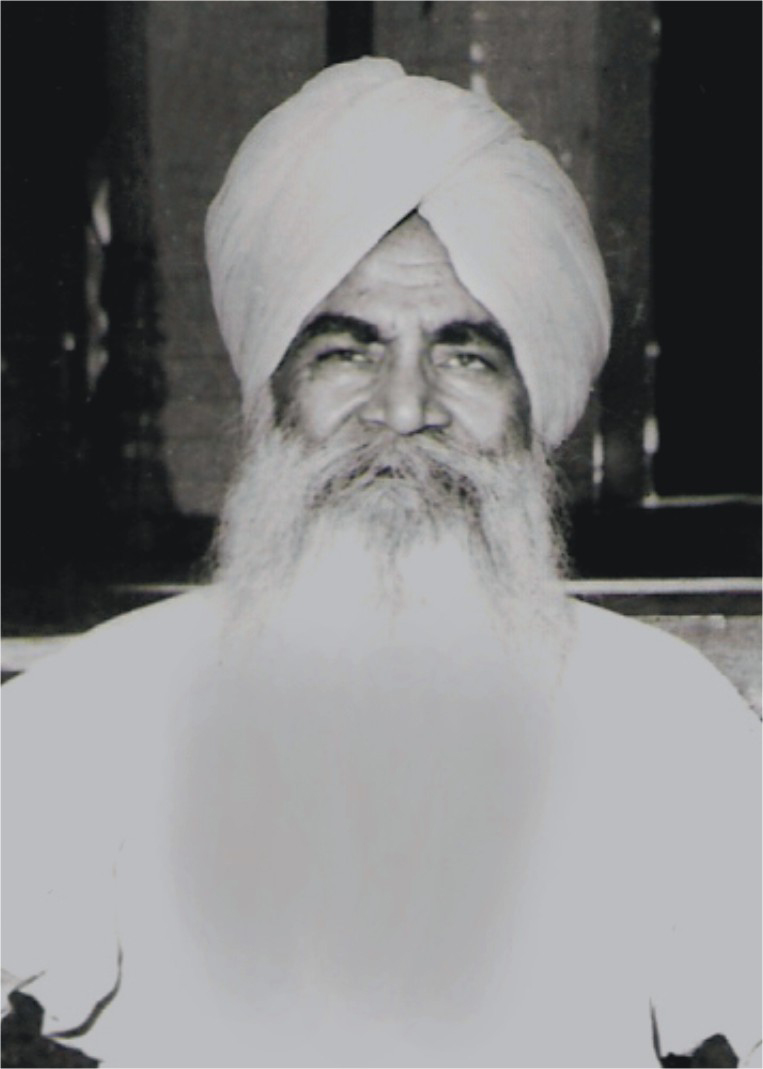
Hari Dass of Dera Sach Khand Ballan

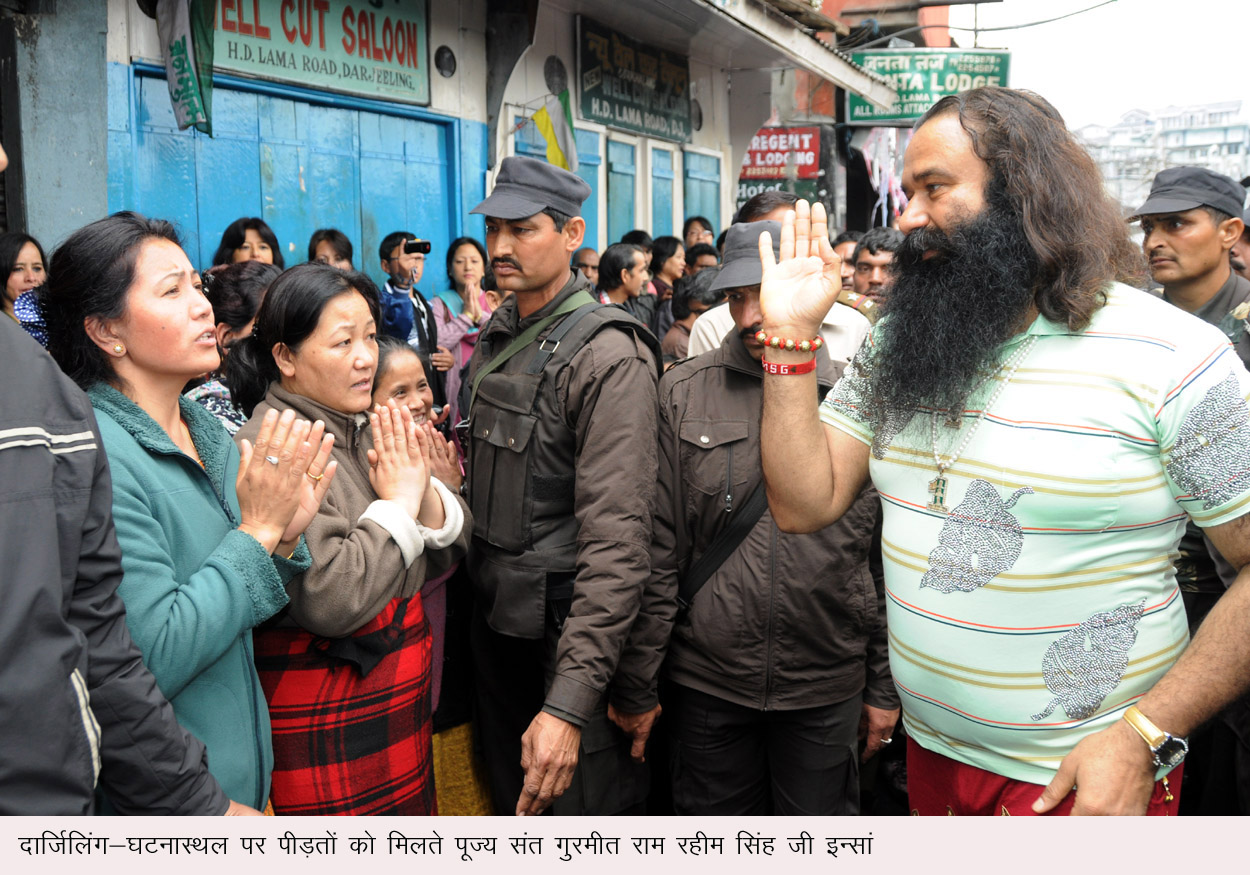
Gurmeet Ram Rahim Singh of the Dera Sacha Sauda

The majority of the followers of these deras are Dalits, Other Backward Classes, and the poor among the Jat Sikhs. However, most of the deras are led by people from upper-caste backgrounds. As of 2007, the Nirankaris were led by a Khatri; the Dera Sacha Sauda was led by a Jat of the Sidhu clan; and the Radha Soamis were led by a Jat of the Dhillon clan.

The Dalit-dominated deras have emerged as major centres of counter-culture, where the Dalits assert their pride, customs and tradition.

== Conflicts with the Khalsa Sikhs ==
The deras are seen as a challenge to the mainstream Sikhism represented by the Khalsa Sikh identity. The total number of the followers of the various deras far exceeds the number of followers of the Harmandir Sahib (Golden Temple) based clerical establishment, the Akal Takht.

The tensions between the Dalits and the Jat-led Khalsa Sikhs have manifested in form of conflicts involving the deras. Some of these incidents include:

Sikh–Nirankari clashes (1978)
In 1978, the Khalsa Sikhs denounced the Sant Nirankaris as apostates, and demanded closure of all Sant Nirankari centres. In 1978, Khalsa Sikhs of the Damdami Taksal and Akhand Kirtani Jatha (AKJ) tried to forcibly shut down the annual Sant Nirankari convention in Amritsar. In the ensuing clash, 12 Khalsa Sikhs and 3 Sant Nirankaris were killed. In 1980, the Sant Nirankari Guru Gurbachan Singh was shot dead.

Bhaniarawala crisis (2001)
The dera leader Baba Piara Singh Bhaniara imitated Guru Gobind Singh, and launched a new holy book, the Bhavsagar Samunder Amrit Vani Granth, after his followers were disallowed from carrying the Sikh holy book Guru Granth Sahib. This led to violent clashes between the Khalsa Sikhs and the followers of Bhaniara.

Meham dispute (2006)
In Meham town, the Ad Dharmi Dalits had been maintaining the Udasi dera of Baba Khazan Singh for six decades. They offered liquor as prasad at the dera, and also distributed it among the devotees. In 2003, the Sikhs placed a copy of Guru Granth Sahib at the dera, and later objected to the liquor offering, arguing that it was against the Sikh Rehat Maryada. In 2006, they forcibly took control of the dera, and replaced all Udasi symbols with Khalsa symbols. This led to a clash between the two communities. However, the timely police intervention prevented escalations. The dera was placed under a government official, and the dispute was referred to the court.

Vienna Temple Attack (2009)
On 25 May 2009, six militants of the Khalistan Zindabad Force (KZF) attacked Ravidassia members of Dera Sach Khand Ballan (DSB) with a gun and knives, at a Ravidassia temple in Vienna, Austria. The Ravidassia leader Niranjan Das, who was visiting the temple built by the Dera members, was seriously wounded in the attack. Two people died in the attack, including Das' deputy Ramanand Dass. The incident led to clashes in India as well, and prompted the Ravidassias to explicitly declare their religion as separate from Sikhism.

Sikh–Dera Sacha Sauda clashes (2007)
In 2007, the Dera Sacha Sauda (DSS) leader Sant Gurmeet Ram Rahim Singh was accused of imitating Guru Gobind Singh, the 10th Sikh Guru . The resulting controversy escalated to civil unrest in Punjab, Haryana, Rajasthan and Delhi. Several people were killed in the clashes, and in 2008, there was an attempt to assassinate Ram Rahim.

== Politics ==
Various political parties, including the Sikh party Shiromani Akali Dal (SAD), and the Bharatiya Janata Party (BJP), and the Indian National Congress (INC), have patronised the deras to attract the Dalit votebank. During the election season, several political leaders and candidates visit the deras, seeking support from the leaders of the various deras. This trend first became visible during the 1997 Punjab Legislative Assembly Election.

The SAD has openly sought electoral support from the Sikh deras. The Sant Samaj deras have openly supported SAD.

Among the non-Sikh deras, the Dera Sacha Sauda (DSS) is influential in the Malwa region, and has a political wing. It has supported multiple political parties in various elections. The Dera Sach Khand Ballan (DSB) asked its Dalit followers to vote for the Bahujan Samaj Party (BSP) in 2012 Punjab Legislative Assembly elections, which was responsible for the dismal performance of the Indian National Congress (INC) in the Doaba region. The Bhaniarwala Dera has not openly supported any political party, but disfavours the Shiromani Akali Dal candidates. The Dera Beas (Radha Soami) has not openly supported any particular party either, but in the past it used to tilt towards the Congress. In the 2012 Punjab elections, it favoured the Akali Dal, after daughter of a former Dera Beas chief married an Akali Dal politician.
