= Amritbani Satguru Ravidas Maharaj Ji =

Holy book of the Ravidassia religion

Amritbani of Guru Ravidas ਅੰਮ੍ਰਿਤਬਾਣੀ ਸਤਿਗੁਰੂ ਰਵਿਦਾਸ ਮਹਾਰਾਜ ਜੀ

Information
- Religion: Ravidassia
- Author: Ramanand Dass of Dera Sach Khand
- Language: Sant Bhasha in Gurmukhi, Hindi, English, German, Italian.
- Period: 30 January 2011 (release); 1 February 2012 (enshrinement)

Amritbani Satguru Ravidas Maharaj Ji (Gurmukhi: ਅੰਮ੍ਰਿਤਬਾਣੀ ਸਤਿਗੁਰੂ ਰਵਿਦਾਸ ਮਹਾਰਾਜ ਜੀ, romanized: Amritabāṇī satigurū ravidāsa mahārāja jī, lit. 'Ambrosial hymns of the true teacher and great king, Ravidas'), Amritbani of Guru Ravidas, or Amritbani Granth, is the holy book of the Ravidassia religion. It was compiled released to provide an ideological basis and contemporary history for the new religion which formed in 2010, to provide a future vision for it.

== History ==
Amritbani of Guru Ravidas was compiled and edited by Ramanand Dass of Dera Sach Khand. The holy book's completion was announced by the Sant Samaj and by Dera Sach Khand at Shri Guru Ravidass Janam Asthan on 30 January 2011, the 633rd anniversary of the birth of Ravidas.

On 1 February 2012, the second anniversary of the creation of the Ravidassia religion, Amritbani of Guru Ravidaswas placed at a shrine dedicated to Ravidas in Bootan Mandi, Jalandhar, Punjab.

== Contents ==
=== Teachings ===
The Amritbani contains bani of Ravidass. The title page features the Har Nishaan symbol and a statement enjoining readers to wish each other "Jai Gurdev". The book contains photos of Ravidas and of Shri Guru Ravidass Janam Asthan. The book also includes a list of the teachings of Ravidas and general principles of the Ravidassia religion.

=== Ragas ===
Amritbani contains 240 ragas culled from Ravidass' teachings. The book also contains 140 shabads, 40 pade, painti akhri, bani haftawar, bani pandran tithi, baran maas updesh, dohra, saand bani, anmol vachan (milni de samen), laawaan, suhag ustat, manglachar, and 231 salok. There are 177 pages in the book. Ragas from Amritbani are recited daily in Ravidassia bhawans. The original language of Amritbani is in Gurmukhi script and the mother tongue of Guru Ravidas, Punjabi. Its other language translations have also been published.

Amritbani, the holy book contains the following hymns: Raga – Siri (1), Gauri (5), Asa (6), Gujari (1), Sorath (7), Dhanasari (3), Jaitsari (1), Suhi (3), Bilaval (2), Gaund (2), Ramkali (1), Maru (2), Kedara (1), Bhairau (1), Basant (1), and Malhar (3). The book contains 140 shabads, 40 pade, and 231 salok.
