= Sant Ravidas Ghat =

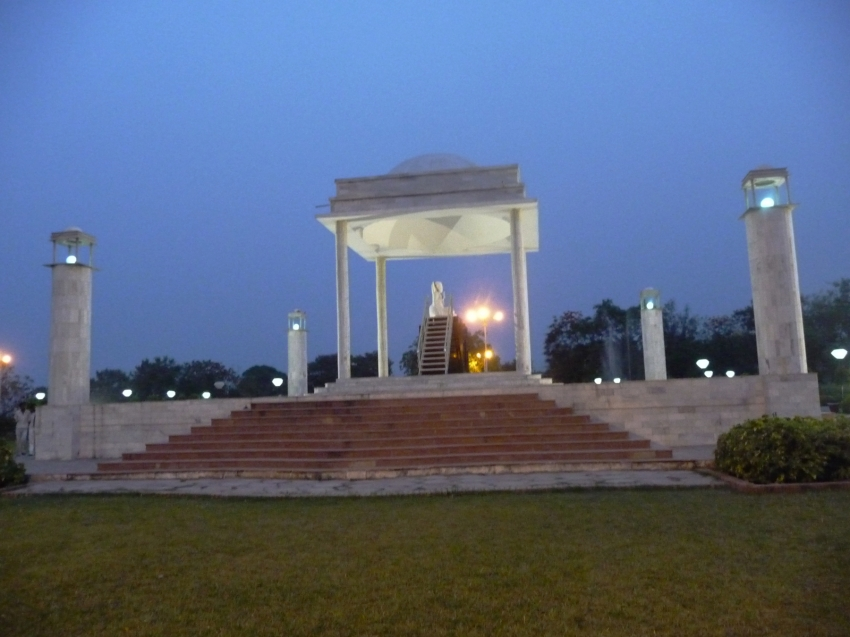
- Sant Ravidas Smarak Park at Sant Ravidas Ghat

Religion
- Affiliation: Hinduism

Location
- Country: India
- Interactive map of Sant Ravidas Ghat
- Coordinates: 25°17′1.049″N 83°0′32.825″E

Sant Ravidas Ghat is the southernmost and largest ghat in Varanasi. To most visitors to Varanasi, it is known for being an important religious place for Ravidasis with a 25 acres park known as Sant Ravidas Smarak Park.

== History ==
The establishment of Ravidas Ghat was announced in February 2008, during the 2008 Golden Palki Shobha Yatra at Sant Ravidas temple on the saint's 631st birth. The ghat was inaugurated in 2009 by Chief Minister Mayawati.

== Tourism and popular culture ==
Sant Ravidas Ghat is nearly 13 minutes drive from Shri Guru Ravidass Janam Asthan, Varanasi.

The place is well known for religious tourism by devotees of Guru Ravidas.

Sant Ravidas Ghat is one of ghats often visited for recreation and during festivals like Dev Deepawali and Ganga Mahotsav.

There is a proposed helium balloon ride facility is at Sant Ravidas Ghat as a tourist attraction.

== See also ==
- Shri Guru Ravidass Janam Asthan
- Shri Guru Ravidas Gurughar
