= KZF =

KZF or kzf may refer to:

- Khalistan Zindabad Force, a designated terrorist organization associated with Sikhism
- kzf, the ISO 639-3 code for Da'a Kaili language, Indonesia
