= Shri Guru Ravidas Gurughar, Tughlakabad =

Important religious places of Ravidasi communities

Coordinates: 28.520078°N 77.253563°E

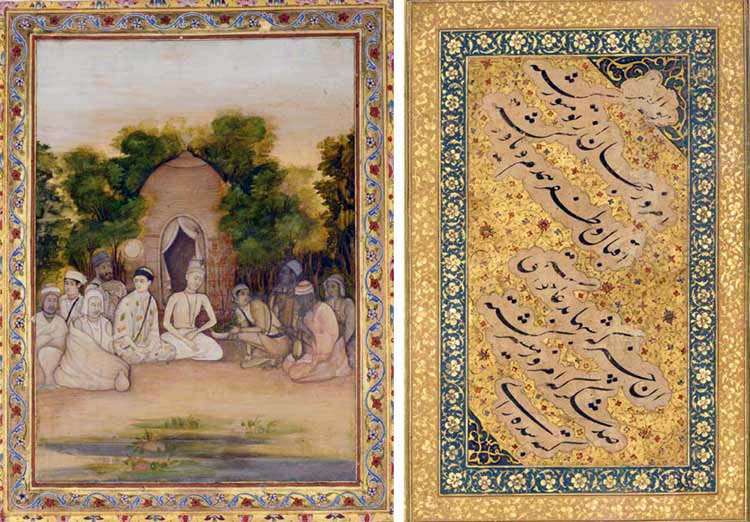

- Location within Delhi

Religion
- Affiliation: Ravidassia
- District: Tughlakabad
- Deity: Ravidas
- Festival: Guru Ravidass Jayanti

Location
- Location: Tughlakabad
- State: Delhi
- Country: India

Website
- Official website

Shri Guru Ravidas Gurughar, Tughlakabad (or Ravidas Temple Tughlakabad or Guru Ravidas Temple) is one of the important religious places of Ravidasi communities like Ad-Dharmis, Ramdasia Sikhs, Chamars, and Mochis. It is situated at Tughlakabad area of Delhi, India.

== History ==
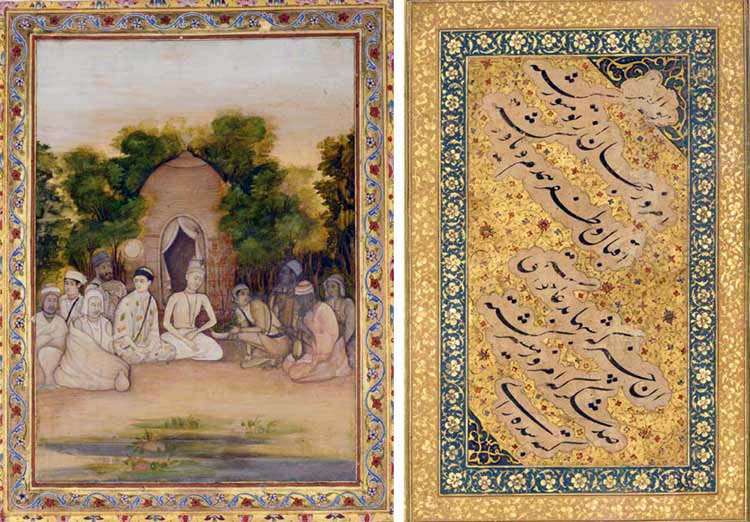
Mughal era painting of Guru Ravidas at Gurughar

Shri Guru Ravidas Gurughar of Tughlaqabad was visited by Sant Ravidas around 1509. As per claims of a purported land grant with the Ravidasia community, nearly 160 years ago on land provided by Sikandar Lodi, an ancestor named Roopa Nand dug out a pond in the area known as chamarwala johar in Khasra No. 123 of Tughlakabad village. The hut of Roopa Nand was situated in khasra No. 124/1 of Tughlakabad village. Later, in the Delhi Land Reforms Act of 1954, this land was shown as 'Shamlat' (village common land). An organization named Guru Ravidas Jainti Samaroh Samiti was formed in 1959 to build an ashram, Guru Ravidas temple and samadhi of Roopa Nand and other saints on 12350 square yards (ca. 1 ha) of land. Four other rooms were also constructed as part of a dharamshala. The temple was inaugurated on 1 March 1959 by Dalit leader and then Union Railways minister Jagjivan Ram.

== Demolition ==
Ravidas Gurughar was demolished by Delhi Development Authority following an 8 April 2019 Supreme Court order. The apex court, upholding a 2018 order of the Delhi High Court, ordered that the area be vacated within two months. The Supreme Court also asked the authorities to ensure compliance of its order. On 11 August 2019, the temple of Sant Ravidas in Tughlakabad was demolished. In October 2019, after several protests against the demolition of the temple, the Supreme Court allowed permanent construction of Guru Ravidas Temple in the place of where structure was demolished in August.

== See also ==
- Shri Guru Ravidass Janam Asthan
- Shri Khuralgarh Sahib
- Sant Ravidas Ghat
- Rashtriya Dalit Prerna Sthal and Green Garden
