= Neetu Badhan Smith =

American jurist

Los Angeles County Superior Court
- Incumbent
- Assumed office 2017

Personal details
- Born: Sacramento, California, United States

Neetu Badhan Smith is the first Sikh woman judge in the United States. Badhan Smith is a judge for the Los Angeles County Superior Court of California. She was appointed to the bench by former Governor Jerry Brown in 2017.

== Biography ==
She was born into an immigrant Ravidasia Sikh family in California. Badhan-Smith earned a Juris Doctor degree from Southwestern Law School and a Bachelor of Arts degree from the University of California, Los Angeles.

Prior to her appointment to the Superior Court, she had served as a deputy public defender at the Los Angeles County Public Defender's Office since 2004. She was an attorney at the Southern California Housing Rights Centre from 2003 to 2004.

She is inspired by Indian jurist Dr. Ambedkar and his movement against casteism.
