= Vienna temple attack =

2009 terrorist attack in Austria

2009 Vienna temple attack
- Location: Rudolfsheim, Vienna, Austria
- Date: 24 May 2009
- Target: Dera Sach Khand followers
- Deaths: 1
- Injuries: 17
- Perpetrator: Khalistan Zindabad Force

On Sunday 24–25 May 2009, several people in the Guru Ravidass Gurdwara in Vienna, Austria, were attacked by six men carrying knives and guns. Two of the victims were identified as visiting Dera Sach Khand head Niranjan Dass, 68, and another leader, Ramanand Dass, 57, who suffered multiple gunshot wounds and died the next day in hospital. At least 15 others were injured, including 4 of the attackers, who were in the end subdued by the other worshipers. This shooting came to be known as the Vienna attack. It was described as a terrorist attack committed by Sikh fundamentalists, who viewed the dera as "blasphemous" and adhering to the Sikh maryada. The incident sparked riots across Northern India. It led to the formalization of a separate Ravidassia religion from mainstream Sikhism.

== Attack and motive ==
The attack occurred at the Ravidasi temple in Vienna on 25 May 2009, when five orthodox Sikhs wielding firearms shot dera-leader Sant Niranjan Dass and his second-in-command Sant Ramanand Maharaj in-front of the congregants that had been gathered there, killing Ramanand. The motivation for the attack was that the orthodox Sikhs viewed the Ravidasis as blasphemous for maintaining a living-guru (dehdari) lineage, had idols and images of Ravidas, and kept the Guru Granth Sahib on the same level as their human guru and beside idols/portraits of Ravidas, since Sikhs view it as offensive for anyone to bow to anything else other than the Guru Granth Sahib in the scripture's presence, as the scripture is viewed as the living embodiment of the Sikh guru.

== Claims and denials of responsibility ==
An email reportedly received by Radio Akash in London, purportedly from the Khalistan Zindabad Force (KZF), claimed responsibility for the attack. The Austriantimes.at reported that a later email purported to be from the Khalistan Zindabad Force denied all involvement in this attack. The later email appeared to have a scanned copy of KZF’s letterhead and contained a date change in longhand. This cast doubt on its authenticity. Austriantimes.at also reported that the visiting leaders had been warned for some time of possible violence against them.

A 28 May 2009 Diepresse.com article reported that the identities of the 6 alleged Sikh attackers had been established. Five of the six had been questioned thoroughly, but the last, the alleged leader, was still too ill to interview, having been shot in the head. Of the six, all were males between 24 and 45 and from Punjab and other regions in northern India, two had entered the country illegally, and four had applied for asylum. It reported that Nirajnan Das was "on the road to recovery". Both the sixth alleged attacker and Niranjan Das were reportedly under heavy guard at the hospital.

An email received by The Tribune newspaper, purported to be from Ranjit Singh Jammu of the KZF, expressed sympathy for the "Ravidassia brotherhood" and denied any involvement.

Akash Radio reported on its web site that it had received, on 29 May 2009, a third email purported to be from the KZF. In this third email, Akash reports, the KZF stated that "Indian agencies" used its letterhead to deny responsibility, and went on to emphasize that it took responsibility for the attack that resulted in the death of Rama Nand, and that KZF had sent the letter to an Indian newspaper which did not print the claim of responsibility, but which was quick to print the retraction.

== Ravidassia identity shift following attack ==
Before the attack at the temple, the Sikh holy book Shri Guru Granth Sahib was installed over there. After this violent clash, followers of the Dera Sachkhand Ballan formally moved to declare a separate Ravidassia identity. As part of this shift, they compiled a new scripture, Amritbani Guru Ravidass Ji, containing only the hymns of Guru Ravidas, and began installing it in place of the Guru Granth Sahib in many Ravidassia temples, including the Guru Ravidas Janam Asthan Temple. This process was not without controversy as some within the community resist the removal of Guru Granth Sahib, seeing it as integral to shared history and identity, while others argue that replacing it affirms the community’s autonomy and addresses long-felt grievances about caste discrimination and marginalization.

== Arrest and trial ==
One of the six suspects detained in connection with the attack was released due to lack of evidence. Four of the six offenders were Non-Resident Indian asylum seekers living in Austria and were identified as Satwinder Singh, 28, Jaspal Singh, 34, Tasum Singh, 45 and Sukhwinder Singh, 28. The other two attackers - Hardeep Singh, 33 and Charnjit Singh, 24, entered Austria illegally, authorities said. Amritpal Singh, a 26-year-old Sikh man of Indian origin, was arrested after a firefight with commandos of the Austrian police who raided his apartment while investigating the murder.

After nearly 11 hours of deliberations, the jury found main defendant Jaspal Singh guilty of shooting Ramanand Dass to death and he received a life-sentence; he was also convicted of attempted murder. Four men were convicted of aiding Singh and were sentenced to between 17 and 18 years, while one was found guilty of attempted coercion and received a 6-month sentence. The prosecutor had alleged that some of the men had travelled to Vienna from Barcelona in Spain with the aim of carrying out their crime.
