= Chak Hakim =

- Village
- Location in Punjab, India Chak Hakim (India)
- Coordinates: 31.241175°N 75.753865°E
- Country: India
- State: Punjab
- District: Kapurthala

Government
  - Type: Panchayati raj (India)
  - Body: Gram panchayat

Population (2011)
  - Total: 2,386
- Sex ratio 1339/1047♂/♀

Languages
  - Official: Punjabi
  - Other spoken: Hindi
- Time zone: UTC+5:30 (IST)
- PIN: 144401
- Telephone code: 01822
- ISO 3166 code: IN-PB
- Vehicle registration: PB-09
- Website: kapurthala.gov.in

Chak Hakim is a village in Phagwara Tehsil in Kapurthala district of Punjab State, India. It is located 39 kilometres (24 mi) from Kapurthala, 1 kilometre (0.62 mi) from Phagwara. 132 kilometres (82 mi) from State capital Chandigarh. The village is administrated by a Sarpanch, who is an elected representative.

== Demography ==
According to the report published by Census India in 2011, Chak Hakim has 523 houses with the total population of 2,386 persons of which 1,339 are male and 1,047 females. Literacy rate of Chak Hakim is 79.30%, higher than the state average of 75.84%. The population of children in the age group 0–6 years is 241 which is 10.10% of the total population. Child sex ratio is approximately 928, higher than the state average of 846.

== Population data ==
Particulars	Total	Male	Female
Total No. of Houses	523	-	-
Population	2,386	1,339	1,047
Child (0-6)	241	125	116
Schedule Caste	1,304	683	621
Schedule Tribe	0	0	0
Literacy	79.30 %	83.11 %	74.33 %
Total Workers	957	865	92
Main Worker	951	0	0
Marginal Worker	6	4	2

== Transport ==
Phagwara Junction Railway Station, Chiheru Railway Station are the nearby railway stations to Chachoki. Jalandhar City Rail Way station is 20 km away from the village. The village is 114 km away from Sri Guru Ram Dass Jee International Airport in Amritsar. Another nearby airport is Sahnewal Airport in Ludhiana which is located 43 km away from the village.
