= Gill Patti =

- village
- Location in Punjab, India Gill Patti (India)
- Coordinates: 30.276°N 74.94°E
- Country: India
- State: Punjab
- District: Bathinda

Population (2001)
  - Total: 2,957

Languages
  - Official: Punjabi (Gurmukhi)
  - Regional: Punjabi
- Time zone: UTC+5:30 (IST)
- Nearest city: Bathinda
- Sex ratio: 1000/828 ♂/♀

Gill Patti is a village in the tehsil and district Bathinda of Punjab, India. It is located on the Bathinda-Kotkapura road between Goniana and Bathinda.Sarpanch of village is Akbar Singh

== Geography ==
Gill Patti is located at 30°16′34″N 74°56′24″E only 6 km from Goniana, 7 km from Bathinda and 225 km (approximately) from the state capital of Chandigarh. The total area of the village is 883 hectares. Bhokhra (3 km), Joga Nand (4 km), Nehian Wala (5 km) and Sivian (5 km) are the surrounding villages.

== Demographics ==
In 2001, according to the census, the village had a total population of 2,957 with 529 households, 1,618 males and 1,339 females and thus has a sex ratio of 828 females per thousand males.

Punjabi is the mother tongue as well as official language of the village.
