= Khalistan Zindabad Force =

Indian Sikh militant group

- Logo of the Khalistan Zindabad Force
- Leader: Ranjit Singh Neeta
- Dates active: 1988 – present
- Active regions: India, Canada, European Union
- Ideology: Separatism
- Status: Active

The Khalistan Zindabad Force (KZF) is a banned Sikh Khalistani militant organisation, that aims to create a sovereign Sikh state called Khalistan by carving State of Punjab and some Punjabi-speaking parts of neighbouring states of Himachal Pradesh, Haryana and Rajasthan out of the Republic of India. The organisation is banned in India and European Union.

== Organisation and activities ==
The Khalistan Zindabad Force is headed by Ranjit Singh Neeta, a native of Jammu and Kashmir. He was listed among India's 20 most wanted persons in 2008. It largely compromises of Jammu-based Sikhs.

The strength and striking capabilities of the Khalistan Zindabad Force are currently unknown, but it is reported that attempts have been made for the Khalistan Zindabad Force and other militant groups from Kashmir to co-ordinate their efforts. Funding of the organisation comes from United Kingdom, Malaysia and Spain.

== Notable attacks ==
Claims and denials of responsibility have been reported in the name of the Khalistan Zindabad Force for a May 2009 attack at the Gurdwara Ravidass in Vienna, Austria, which killed Rama Nand, a leader of the Dera Sach Khand, injured 17 people, and sparked riots across northern India.

== Status ==
In December 2005 the European Union classified the Khalistan Zindabad Force as a terrorist organisation, freezing its monetary assets throughout its 25 member countries.

The KZF remains banned in India and the European Union. The Khalistan Zindabad Force was reported to still be active in 2008. In 2019, a letter purporting to be from the KZF threatened Indian agencies and the Chief Minister of Punjab.

On February 12, 2020, the special court of the National Investigation Agency (NIA) India in Mohali, Punjab issued non-bailable warrants against Pakistan-based KZF chairperson Ranjeet Singh Neeta and Germany-based Gurmeet Singh Bagga. The court issued warrants against Neeta and Bagga during an investigation related to the delivery of arms, ammunition, explosives, communication devices, and fake currency notes from the other side of the border with the help of a drone. This is the second time in the past five months that legal action was taken against Bagga. Earlier in October, Bagga was amongst the eight Khalistani operatives against whom Interpol issued a Red Corner Notice. Speaking about the verdict, NIA spokesperson said that their investigation revealed that both Neeta and Bagga were involved in the illegal transfer of arms, ammunition, explosives, and other products from across the border. He said, "Investigation has revealed that they have been able to recruit certain individuals from Punjab for carrying out terrorist activities."

On March 17, 2020, National Investigation Agency (NIA) files charge sheet against nine Khalistani terrorists for their alleged involvement in Punjab drone arms drop case. All the accused have been charged with IPC relevant provisions, Arms Act and Explosives Substances Act and Unlawful Activities (Prevention) Act.

February 2021, it is reported through official sources and internal elements of KZF that Ranjeet Singh is no longer alive. His death cause reported was heart attack during first week of February 2021. Officially neither KZF nor the Indian government has spoken about it but there are foreign and independent media news agencies that reported his death news is confirmed.

== See also ==
- Kharku
