= Ravidassia =

Indian religion

- ਰਬਿਦਾਸੀ
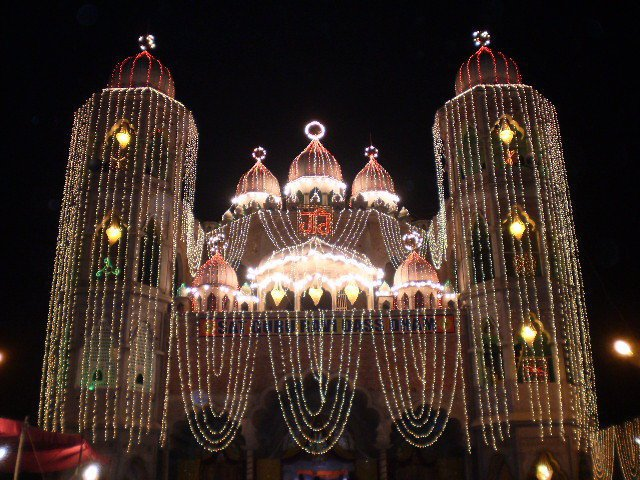
- Sri Guru Ravidass Dham in Bootan Mandi, Jalandhar
- Classification: Indian religion
- Scripture: Amritbani Guru Ravidass Ji
- Theology: Monotheism
- Region: Indian subcontinent
- Language: Punjabi, Hindi, Urdu
- Origin: Punjab
- Separated from: Sikhism
- Logo: Nishaan

Ravidassia or the Ravidas Panth is a religion based on the teachings of Guru Ravidas. It was considered a sect within Sikhism until 2009. The new religion was officially announced on 29 January 2010 by the Dera Sachkhand Ballan. Its scripture is the Amritbani Satguru Ravidas Maharaj Ji. However, some Ravidassias continue to maintain mainstream Sikh religious practices, including the reverence of the Guru Granth Sahib as their focal religious text, wearing Sikh articles of faith (5Ks), and appending Singh or Kaur to their names.

Historically, Ravidassia represented a range of beliefs in the Indian subcontinent, with some devotees of Ravidass counting themselves as Ravidassia, but first formed in the early 20th century in colonial British India. The Ravidassia tradition began to take on more cohesion following 1947, and the establishment of successful Ravidassia tradition in the diaspora. Estimates range between two and five million for the total number of Ravidassias.

Ravidassias Sikhs believe that Ravidas is their Guru (saint) whereas the Khalsa Sikhs have traditionally regard him as one of many bhagats (holy persons), a position considered lower than that of a Guru in Sikhism. Furthermore, Ravidassias Sikhs accept living sants of Ravidass deras as Guru. The Ravidassia religion was significantly emerged as a distinct faith following the 2009 assassination attack on their visiting living Guru Niranjan Dass and his deputy Ramanand Dass in Vienna by Sikh militants. Ramanand Dass died from the attack, Niranjan Dass survived his injuries, while over a dozen attendees at the temple were also injured. This triggered a decisive break of the Ravidassia group from the orthodox Sikh structure.

Prior to their break from Khalsa Sikhism, the Dera Bhallan revered and recited the Guru Granth Sahib of Sikhism in Dera Bhallan. However, following their schism from mainstream Sikhism, the Dera Bhallan compiled their own holy book based exclusively on Ravidas's teachings, the Amritbani Guru Ravidass Ji, and Dera Bhallan Ravidassia temples now use this book in place of the Guru Granth Sahib.

== History ==
=== Basis ===
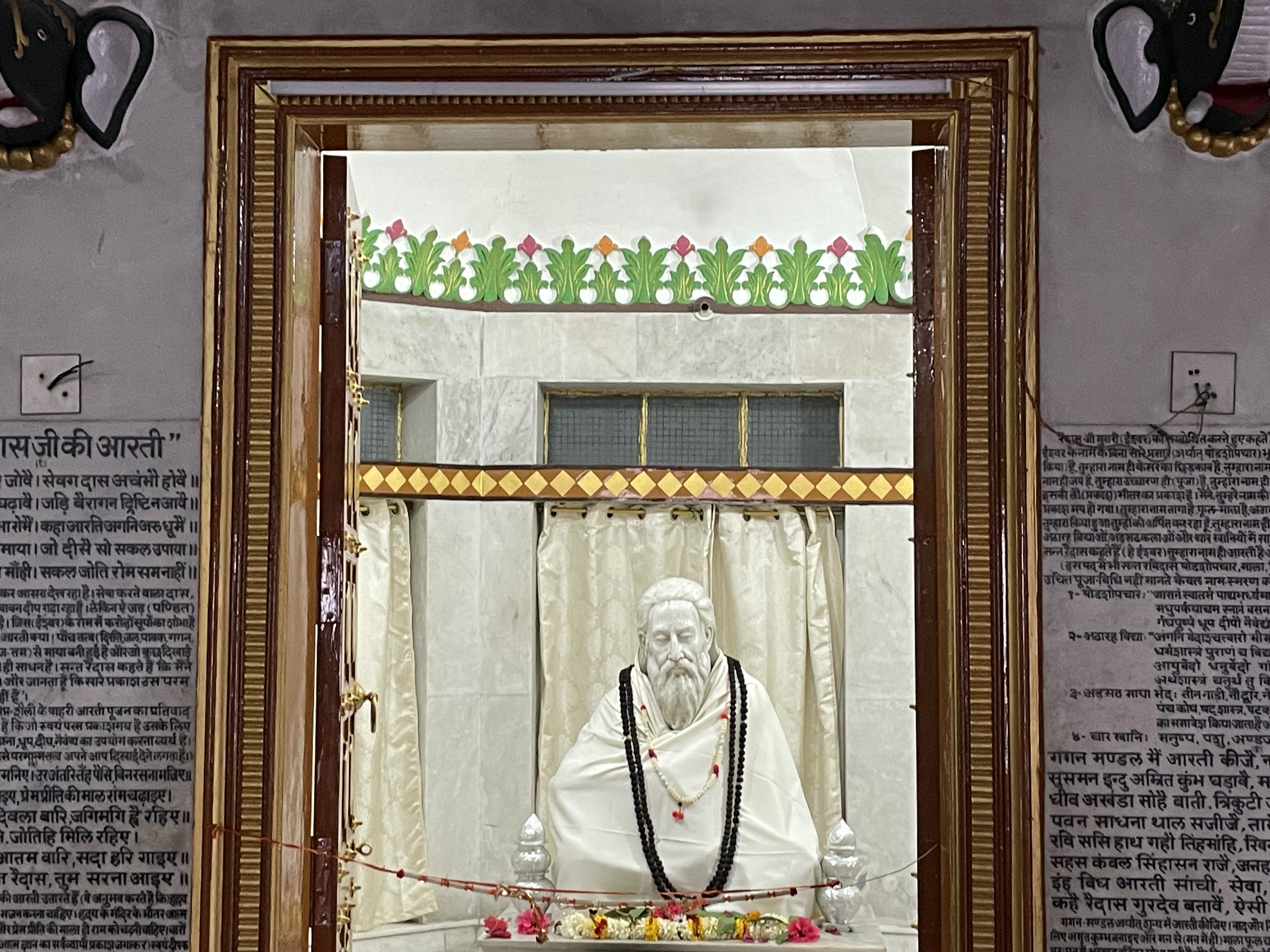
Idol of Ravidas from the sanctum of the Guru Ravidas Temple, Raj Ghat, Varanasi

Ravidas was born on 15 January 1377 CE (Indian calendar Sunday Sukhal Falgin Parvithta 1433) to the Chamar community. His birthplace was a locality known as Seer Govardhan in the city of Varanasi, Uttar Pradesh state, India. The birthplace is now marked by the Shri Guru Ravidass Janam Asthan (Begampura), and is a major place of pilgrimage for the followers of Guru Ravidas today. Ravidassias Sikhs believe that Ravidas died in Benares at the age of 151.

=== Precursory movements ===
There existed a diversity of Ravidasi-affiliated panths and deras that were loosely affiliated with one another, headed by sants who had Chamar-origins, such as the Satnamis (Sadh and Satnampanth) that had been established by Bir Bhan (in 1657 in eastern Punjab), Jagjivan Das (in the 18th century in Barabanki district, near Lucknow), and Ghasidas (in 1820 in Chhattisgarh). These early movements had connections with Kabir Panth.

In 1920–25, the Ad-Dharmi movement arose, which consolidated a separate religious identity centered on Ravidas. Around the same time, the Singh Sabha movement of Sikhism was well-underway, which also was consolidating for a separate, Sikh identity apart from Hinduism. Prominent leaders and thinkers of both movements had been educated in Arya Samajist institutions, thus they both adopted an Arya Samaj-approach to push for their separate identities, combined with a Judeo-Christian understanding of religion due to Christian missionary and British colonial influence (i.e., a central scripture to base their religion around). Both the Ravidas-aligned movements and Singh Sabhaists revered the Guru Granth Sahib, the primary scripture of Sikhism. However, the Ravidasis celebrated the scripture primarily due to it containing the most notable and earliest-recorded compositions linked to Ravidas. Thus, Ravidasis placed their prime figure's bani on a higher level of importance than the bani found in the scripture authored by others. The Ad-Dharmis compiled a holy-book known as the Ad Prakash ("original light"), where-in they elevated the historical Ravidas as their central figure, thereby giving a traditional/spiritual basis to their modern religious movement, with Ravidas being imagined as a main "guru" and his poetry forming the basis of their beliefs. Despite this, the Sikh scripture, the Guru Granth Sahib, continued to be used by them in their sacred spaces. In 1946, the Ad-Dharmis took-on the new name: Ravi Dass Mandal. In 2003, there arose a caste-based conflict in Talhan village of Punjab over the management of a local shrine which involved Ad-Dharmis.

Amongst the Ravidasi-affiliated deras, the Dera Sachkhand Ballan (D.S.B.) played a prominent missionary role, spreading the religious beliefs, including in the diaspora through the Mission Begumpura. Mission Begumpura aimed to consolidate a central location of pilgrimage and worship for the religious community at Seer Gobardhanpur. The dera's second guru, Sant Sarwan Dass, had sponsored a mission to Varanasi to locate and establish a location to serve as the focal point of the Ravidassia community, to realize Begumpura, with construction of a temple there beginning on 14 June 1965. Dalits had longed been excluded from Hindu temples and Sikh gurdwaras by higher castes, thus being shut-out from sacred spaces. Thus, the decision to build their own, central shrine was a mark of independence and upward-mobility, a place where Begumpura paradise could be realize, where-in all are accepted and none are excluded. In 2000, a special, annual, religious pilgrimage train called the Begumpura Express was inaugurated, which would take pilgrims from Jalandhar Cantonment to Varanasi on the occasion of Ravidas' birthday, which furthered promoted the conceptualization of Varanasi as being the central pilgrimage location of the religious movement, akin to Mecca for Muslims and Amritsar for Sikhs. There were calls for gilding of their central temple in Varanasi, a Golden Temple for them, just like how the Sikhs had their own, with the first phase of adding gold-plates to the shrine beginning in 2008.

=== Foundation of a separate religious identity and split from mainstream Sikhism ===
Before the 2009 armed attack on Guru Ravidass Temple in Vienna, the majority of Ravidassias were followers of Sikhism. Mainstream Sikhs had long objected to the Ravidasi practice of maintaining the Guru Granth Sahib beside idols/images of Ravidas, alongside a living-guru (dehdari), with all three being placed on an equal-height platform. Normative Sikhs felt this was a violation of Sikh maryada by the heterodoxical Ravidassia, since the Guru Granth Sahib was viewed by orthodox Sikhs as the embodiment of their guru, thus were offended when persons bowed to an idol or living-guru in the scripture's presence. Furthermore, the dera was not in-line with the move toward a streamlined Sikh identity embodied by the Khalsa Panth. There were also other deras which had offended mainstream Sikh sensibilities due to alleged blasphemy and misconduct centred on issues and disagreements related to iconography, scripture, and ritual, such as Dera Sacha Sauda and Dera Bhaniarawala. In 2001, Dera Bhaniarawala attempted to compile their own granth, with mainstream Sikhs feeling as it attempted to emulate the Guru Granth Sahib. Furthermore, the dera-leader rode a horse in a similar manner that Guru Gobind Singh is portrayed as, which further fuelled tensions between the two groups. In 2007, the Dera Sacha Sauda leader, Gurmeet Ram Rahim Singh, offended Sikhs by dressing-up in a costume emulating that of Guru Gobind Singh and introducing a baptismal ceremony known as Jām-e-Insān, which copied the Sikh practice of Amrit Sanchar. These controversies led to protests against and deaths between Sikhs and followers of the deras.

On May 24, 2009, six shooters attacked Sant Ramanand and Sant Niranjan Das in the mentioned shrine. All six attackers were asylum seekers living in Austria and have been identified as Satwinder Singh (28), Jaspal Singh (34), Tasum Singh (45), and Sukhwinder Singh (28). The other two attackers, Hardeep Singh (33) and Charnjit Singh (24), entered Austria illegally. In this terrorist attack, Sant Ramanand, 57, was shot dead and more than a dozen others wounded, including another preacher. This attack led to violent protests in the state of Punjab in India and peaceful protest in London. Later, the Austrian court sentenced Jaspal Singh, 35, to life in prison for murder, and the other four terrorists received 17 to 18 year prison sentences. The sixth terrorist got six months in prison for attempted coercion. The funeral of Ramanand was held in June 2009 and attended by many prominent politicians from across Punjab and Uttar Pradesh. In the aftermath of the attack, the Chamar/Ravidassia community protested both in India and abroad. While protests abroad were peaceful, in Jalandhar and other parts of Punjab they became violent, with vandalism occurring, involving clashes with police. Four protests were killed, who would later be memorialized as martyrs (shahadat, known as Ravidassia Qaum da Shaheed) of the Ravidassia movement. The deaths of the four protesters and of Ramanand was commemorated on 13 June 2009, in an event known as Shradhanjali Samagam by the Dera Sachkhand Ballan.

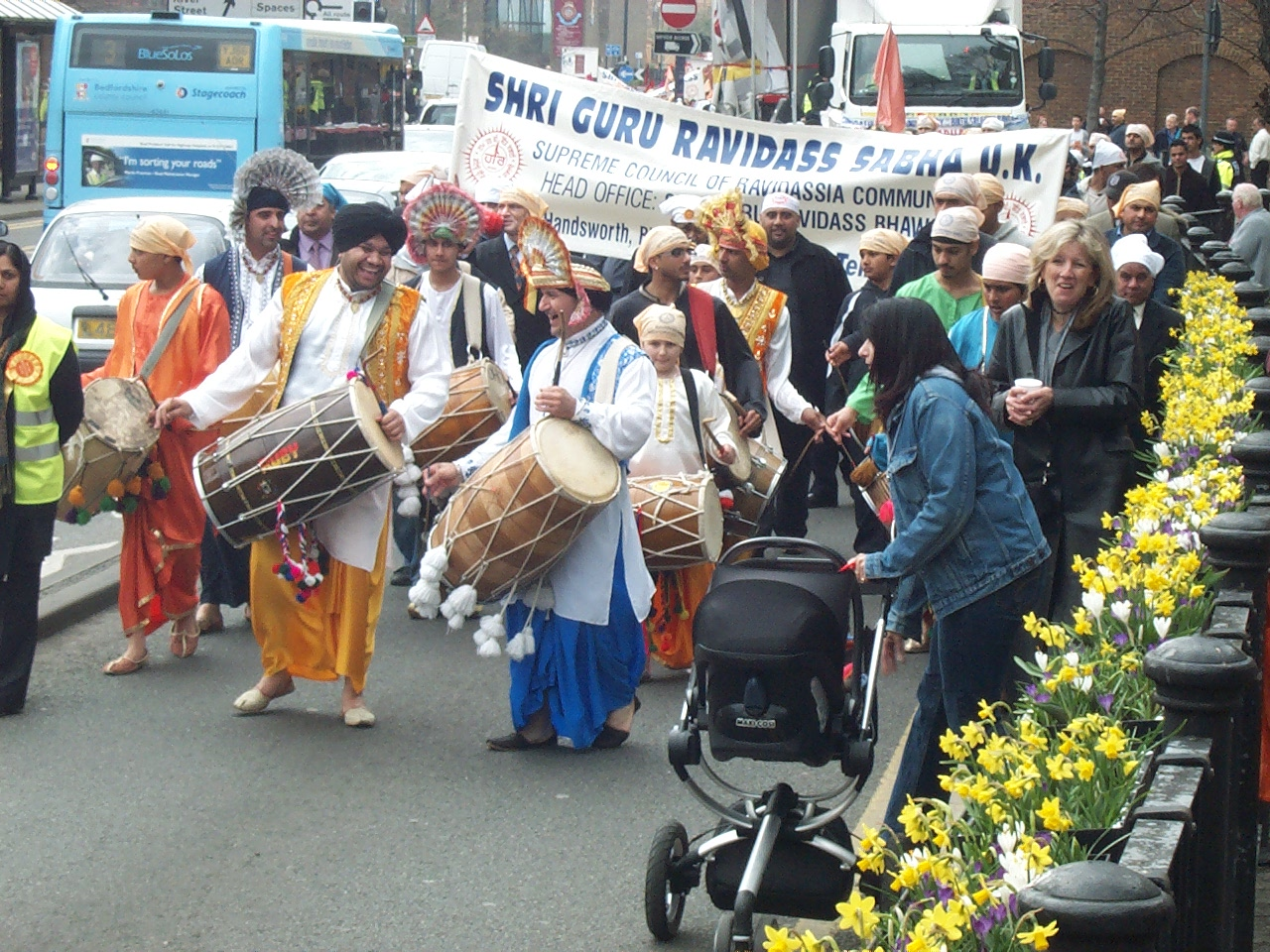
Procession of Ravidassias in Bedford

On the occasion of the 633rd birth anniversary of Ravidass in 2010, Dera Sachkahnd Ballan announced a new religion called Ravidassia. Dera also announced that the community would have its own separate religious book called Amritbani Satguru Ravidas Maharaj Ji, a separate symbol 'Har' and a separate motto, 'Jai Gurudev'. The move triggered debate among the religious, social, and political circles of Punjab, and Shiromani Akali Dal and the SGPC tried to convince Dera Ballan Head Sant Niranjan Dass to reverse the decision. Akal Takhat also took an unprecedented step and organised Akand Path in the memory of murdered Sant Ramanand. SGPC president Avtar Singh Makkar visited Dera Ballan to meet Sant Niranjan Dass, but he was not allowed to meet him.

== Beliefs ==
Ravidas taught the following principles:

- The oneness, omnipresence and omnipotence of God.
- Man changa to kathoti me Ganga (Note: A loose translation of "Man changa to kathoti me Ganga" is : If the mind is pure, even a bowl of water is as sacred as the Ganges. It is also sometimes interpreted more broadly as To the pure, everything is pure.)
- The human soul is a particle of God.
- The rejection of the notion that God cannot be met by lower castes.
- To realise God, which is the goal of human life, man should concentrate on God during all rituals of life.
- The only way of meeting with God (moksha) is to free the mind from duality.

== Places of worship ==
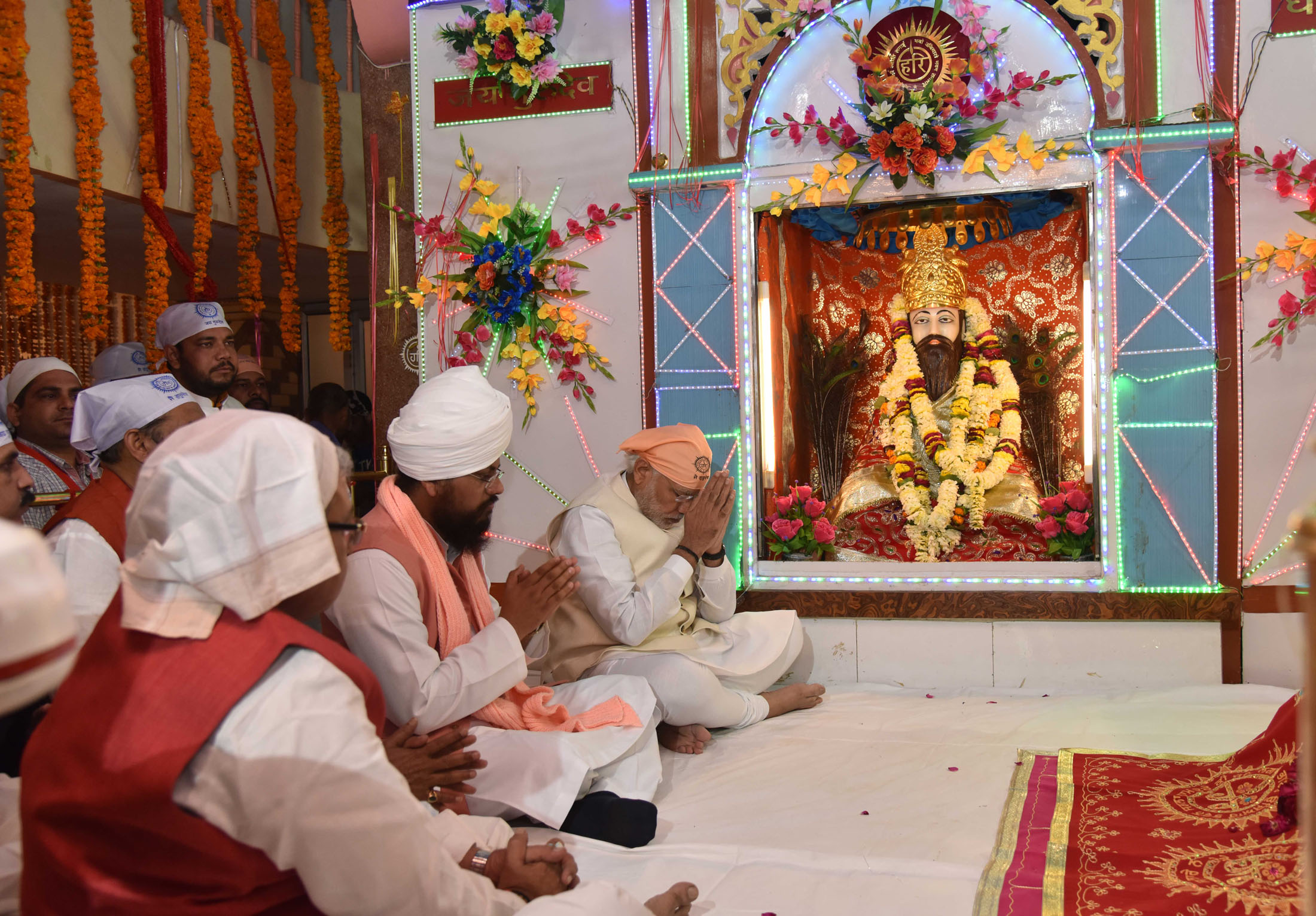
The Prime Minister Narendra Modi is in the sanctum of Shri Guru Ravidas Janmsthan Mandir in Varanasi.

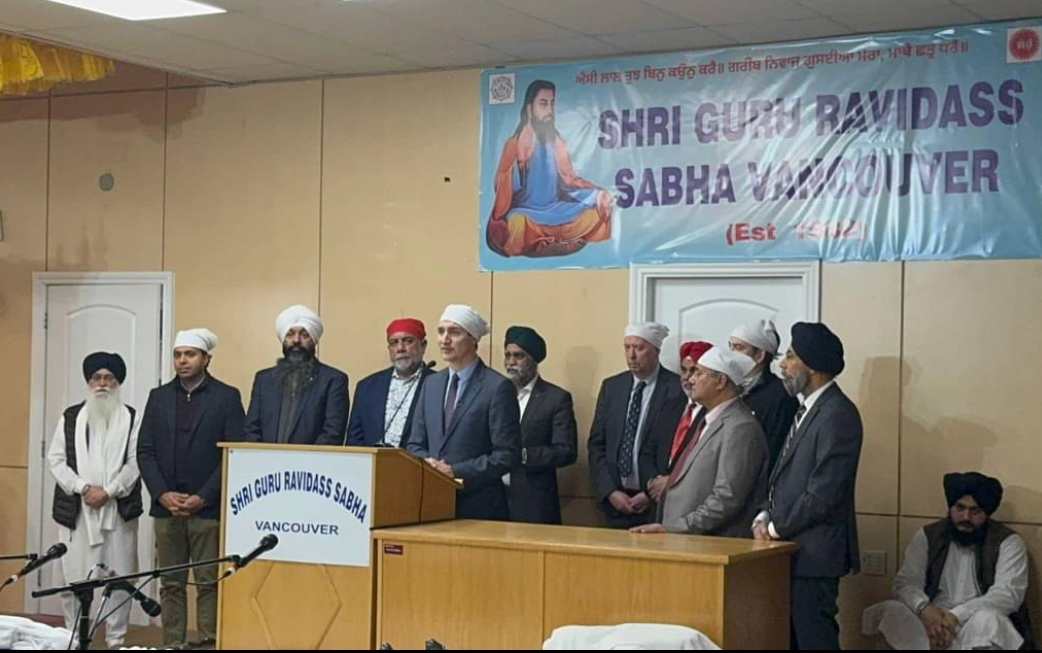
Former Canadian Prime Minister Justin Trudeau at Guru Ravidass Temple, Vancouver

A Ravidassia place of worship is called a dera, sabha, mandir, gurudwara, or bhawan, sometimes translated as temple.

Outside the sabha there is always a flag upon which is written the Nishaan, and above it the "Harr" symbol which symbolising enlightenment from Guru Ravidas' teachings. But Guru Ravidass Sabhas in Derby, Walsall, Gravesend, Montreal and Papakura are exceptions, as these Sabhas' official title boards display Ek Onkar and Khanda emblems alongside Harr. The title boards of these sabhas clearly mark the buildings as both Sikh Gurdwaras and Ravidass Temples. Moreover, Derby Sabha's display board mentions it as a Sikh temple.

== Scriptures ==
Ravidassia places of worship contain the holy book Amritbani Guru Ravidass Ji which contains all the hymns by Guru Ravidas. This book contains the following hymns: Raga – Siri (1), Gauri (5), Asa (6), Gujari (1), Sorath (7), Dhanasari (3), Jaitsari (1), Suhi (3), Bilaval (2), Gaund (2), Ramkali (1), Maru (2), Kedara (1), Bhairau (1), Basant (1), and Malhar (3). The book contains 140 shabads, 40 pade, and 231 salok. There are 177 pages in all of the book.

A version of the holy book Amrit Bani containing 240 hymns of Guru Ravidas was installed at the Guru Ravidas temple in Jalandhar, Punjab, on 1 February 2012 on the occasion of birth anniversary of Guru Ravidass. The Dera Sach Khand Ballan religious community had announced the formation of the new Ravidassia religion and separation from Sikhism at Varanasi. The split from Sikhism was triggered after the killing of its deputy head Ramanand Dass in May 2009 at a temple in Vienna by some Sikh radicals. President of newly formed Begumpura Lok Party and a supporter of the new religion, Satish Bharti, said that the copies of the new Bani were put on display during the religious processions in order to assert that the community members are firm believers of the new religion.

== Ravidassia in the UK census ==
In the United Kingdom, during the 2011 census, the Office for National Statistics counted Ravidassia as a separate religion from Sikhism. There were 11058 individuals who described themselves as Ravidassia in the census. Data shows that around 10% of members of Ravidassias community cited their religion as ’Ravidassia’ – empathically distinct from Sikhs and Hindus. During the census, not even a single Guru Ravidass Gurdwara came into direct support of this separate identity, and till date, all Guru Ravidass Gurdwaras in Britain are practising Sikhism and they do pray and perform all rituals in the presence of Shri Guru Granth Sahib.

Unlike the UK Office for National Statistics, the Indian government and its census department have not accepted the Ravidassias community as a religion. During the 2011 census, the Ravidassia community was counted alongside other groups such as Ramdasia Sikh and Jatav under the title of Chamar caste.

== Mauritian Ravidassias ==
In Mauritius, for Ravidassias, a different terminology is in use called Ravived. During the initial stage of migration in Mauritius, significant numbers of Chamar people joined the Arya Samaj in the hope that it would help them to be free from the curse of casteism, as it was claimed by the leaders of the Arya Samaj. But later, Upper Caste Arya Samajis started building separate halls for themselves and Chamars for prayer within the same shrine to avoid Arya Samaj being labelled as a Chamar religion, which led to the establishment of Arya Ravived Pracharini Sabha in 1935.

== Customs ==
The Ravidassia employ the greeting "ਜੈ ਗੁਰੂਦੇਵ" (Jai Gurdev, जय गुरुदेव), meaning “hail the god-like teacher”, the motto of the religion.

== Symbols ==
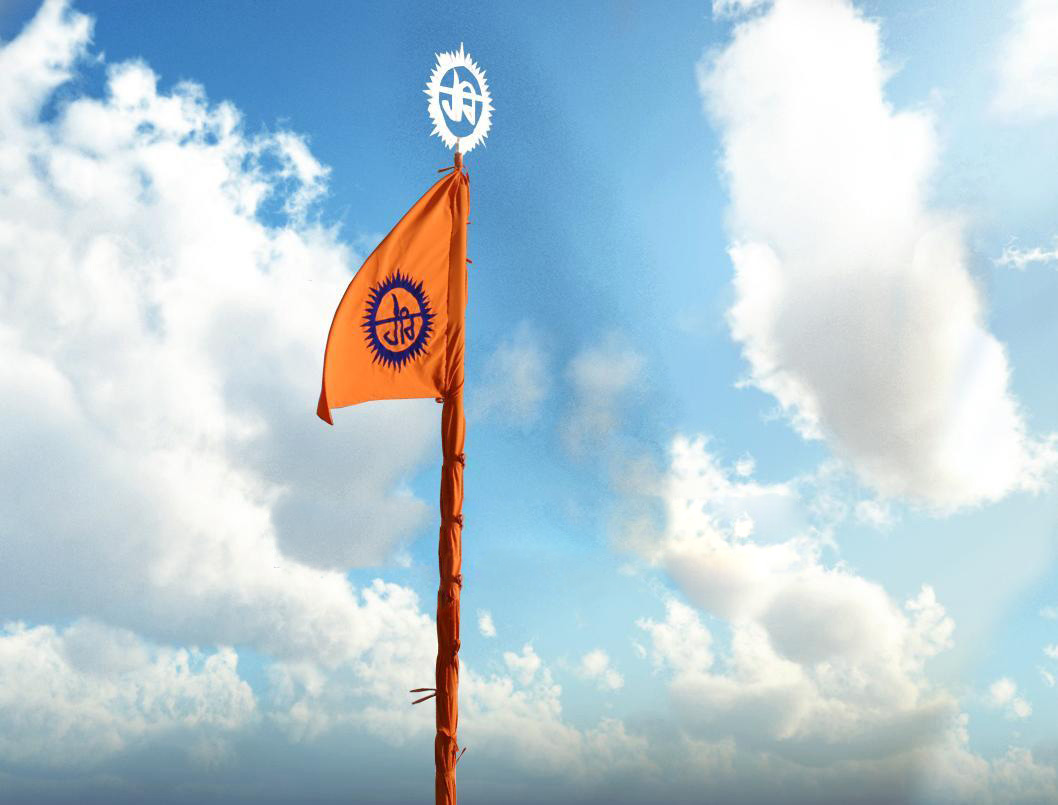
Nishan Sahib

The Ravidassia religious symbol is the Khanda, Harr Nishaan and Ik Onkar. The Gurmukhi transliteration of the name Harr is the main symbol of the Ravidassia religion. It is also called as Koumi Nishan.

The religion is also represented by a flag, with the insignia "Har" which, states Ronki Ram, includes:

- A bigger circle with 40 rays of sunlight signifying forty hymns of Guru Ravidas;
- Inside the big circle is a small circle, inside which is written "Har" in Gurmukhi language (ਹਰਿ) with a flame on top of it;
- The flame represents the Naam (word) that would illuminate the entire world, and reaches the outer circle;
- Between the two circles is written a couplet composed by Ravidas: ਨਾਮ ਤੇਰੇ ਕਿ ਜੋਤੀ ਲਗਾਈ, ਭੇਈਓ ਓ ਭਵਣ ਸਗਲਈ (Naam tere kee jot lagayi, Bhaio Ujiaaro Bhawan saglaare, "Your Name is the flame I light; it has illuminated the entire world")

The insignia Har, states Ram, represents the "very being of Ravidass and his teachings".

== Sects of Punjabi Chamar Community ==
"Ramdasia is a term used in general for Sikhs whose ancestors belonged Chamar caste. Originally they are followers of Guru Ravidass ji who belongs to Chamar community ". Both the words Ramdasia and Ravidasia are also used interchangeably while these also have regional context. In Puadh and Malwa, largely Ramdasia in used while Ravidasia is predominantly used in Doaba.

Ramdasia Sikhs are enlisted as scheduled caste by Department of Social justice, Empowerment and Minorities- Government of Punjab. On Department's list of Scheduled Caste, this caste is listed on serial number 9 along with other Chamar caste synonymous such as Ravidasia, Ramdasia and so on.

Ad-Dharmis of Chamar sect are followers of Guru Ravidas, and incorporate elements of Sikhism as they regard Shri Guru Granth Sahib as their religious text.

== Festival ==
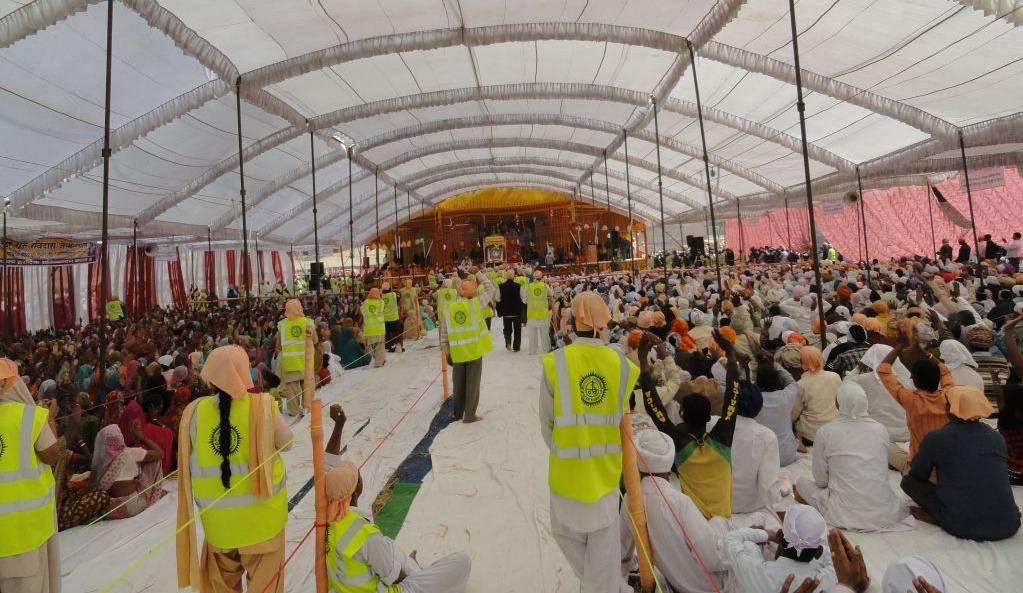
Devotees at 635th Anniversary of Guru Ravidas at Sri Guru Ravidass Janamsthan Gurdwara, Varanasi

The birthday of Ravidas is celebrated every year at the Seer Gowardhanpur village temple in Varanasi the state of Uttar Pradesh in January or February and the government of India has declared it a gazetted holiday. Other important festivals the Ravidasia community celebrates are Bandi Chhor Divas, Guru Gobind Singh's birthday and Guru Nanak's birthday.

== Ravidasia diaspora ==
Ravidasia Sikh diaspora emigrated from India and Pakistan is significant. There are Ravidasia Sikh settlers in Europe, as well as a sizable Ravidasia Sikh population in North America, primarily in the United States and Canada. Mahiya Ram Mehmi and Mahey were the very first people who landed in British Columbia in 1906. They were both also involved in the foundation of the first Canadian Gurdwara, the Khalsa Diwan Society, Vancouver. There is a sizeable population of Ravidasia Sikhs in Oceania too. Ravidassias from Doaba established the second gurdwara in the Oceania region in Nasinu on Fiji Island in 1939. A Classical Study by W.H. Briggs in his book Punjabis in New Zealand, Briggs penned down the precise number of Ravidassias in New Zealand during the very first wave of immigration.

Ravidassia community started immigrating from Punjab to Britain in 1950, and according to a book named 'Sikhs in Britain: An Annotated Bibliography' published in 1987, the population of the Ravidassia community in the West Midlands was around 30,000 during that period. As of 2021, it is estimated that the Ravidasia population in Britain is around 70,000.

In the United States, an estimated 20,000 Ravidassia followers live in California.

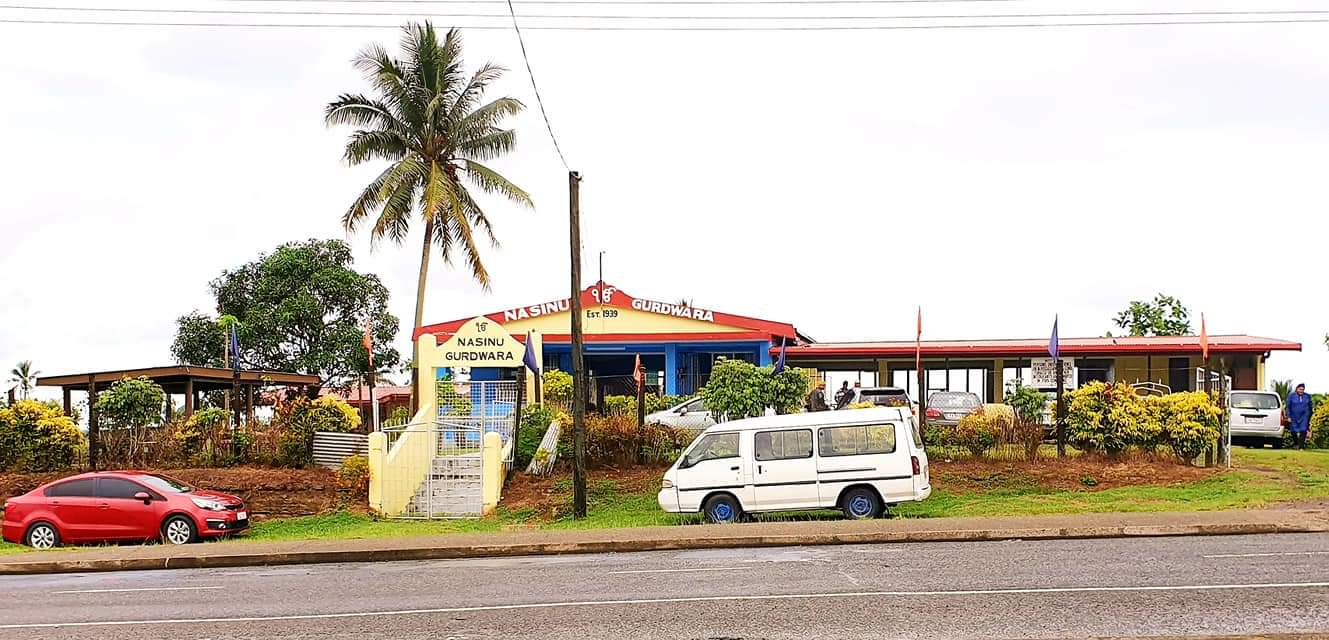
Gurdwara Guru Ravidass, Nasinu, Fiji Established in 1939

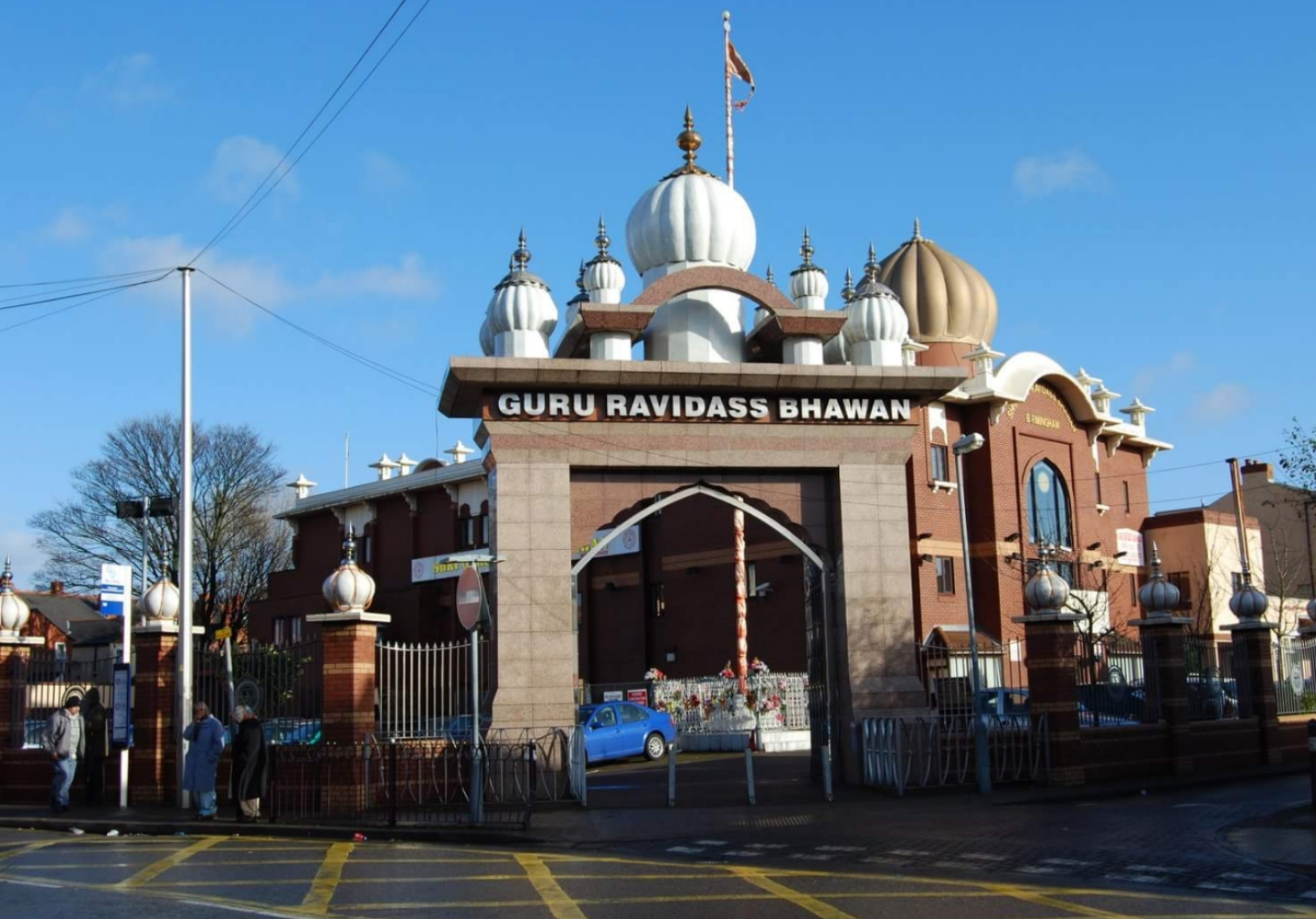
Gurdwara Guru Ravidass Bhavan, Birmingham

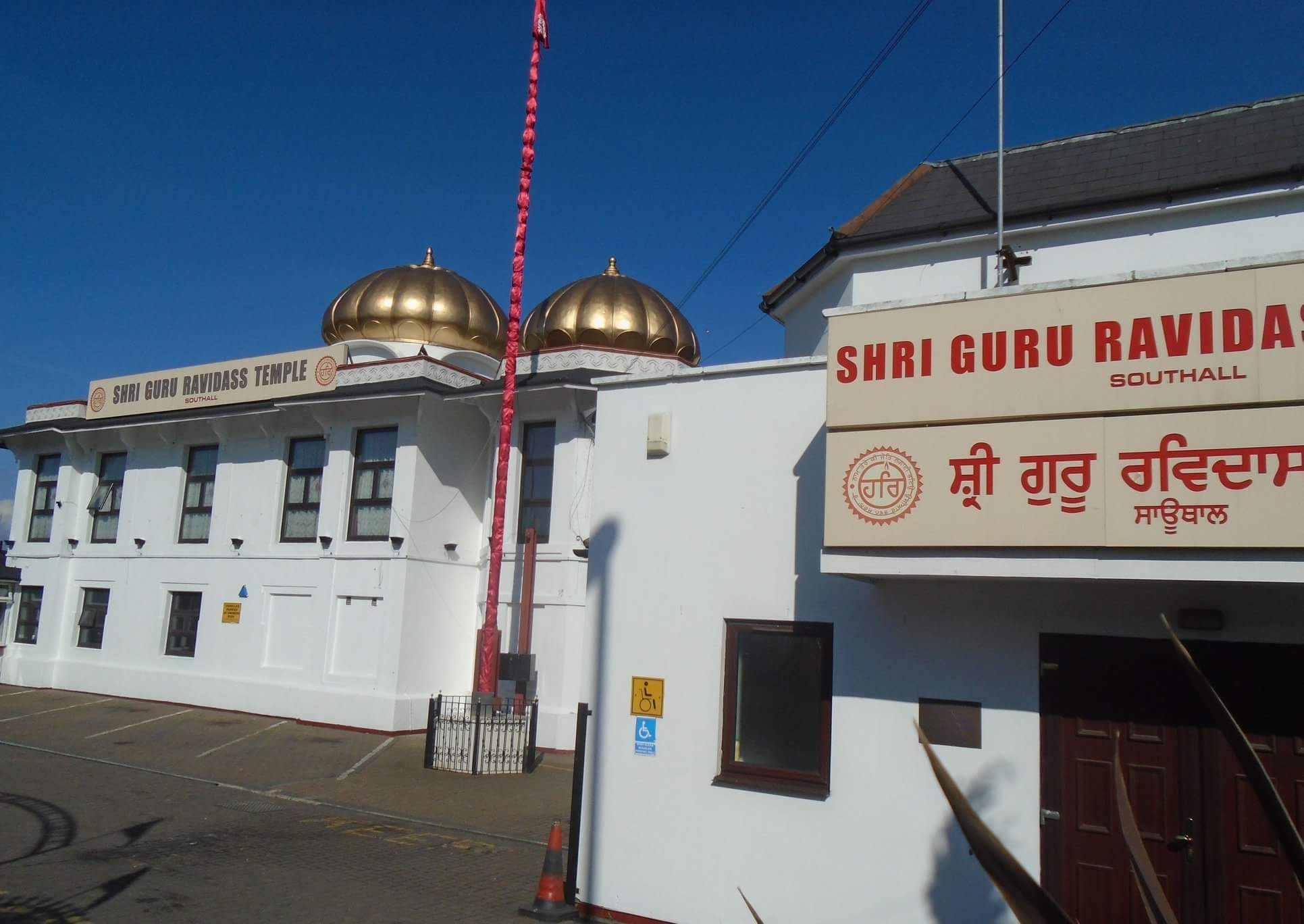
Gurdwara Guru Ravidass Sabha, Southall

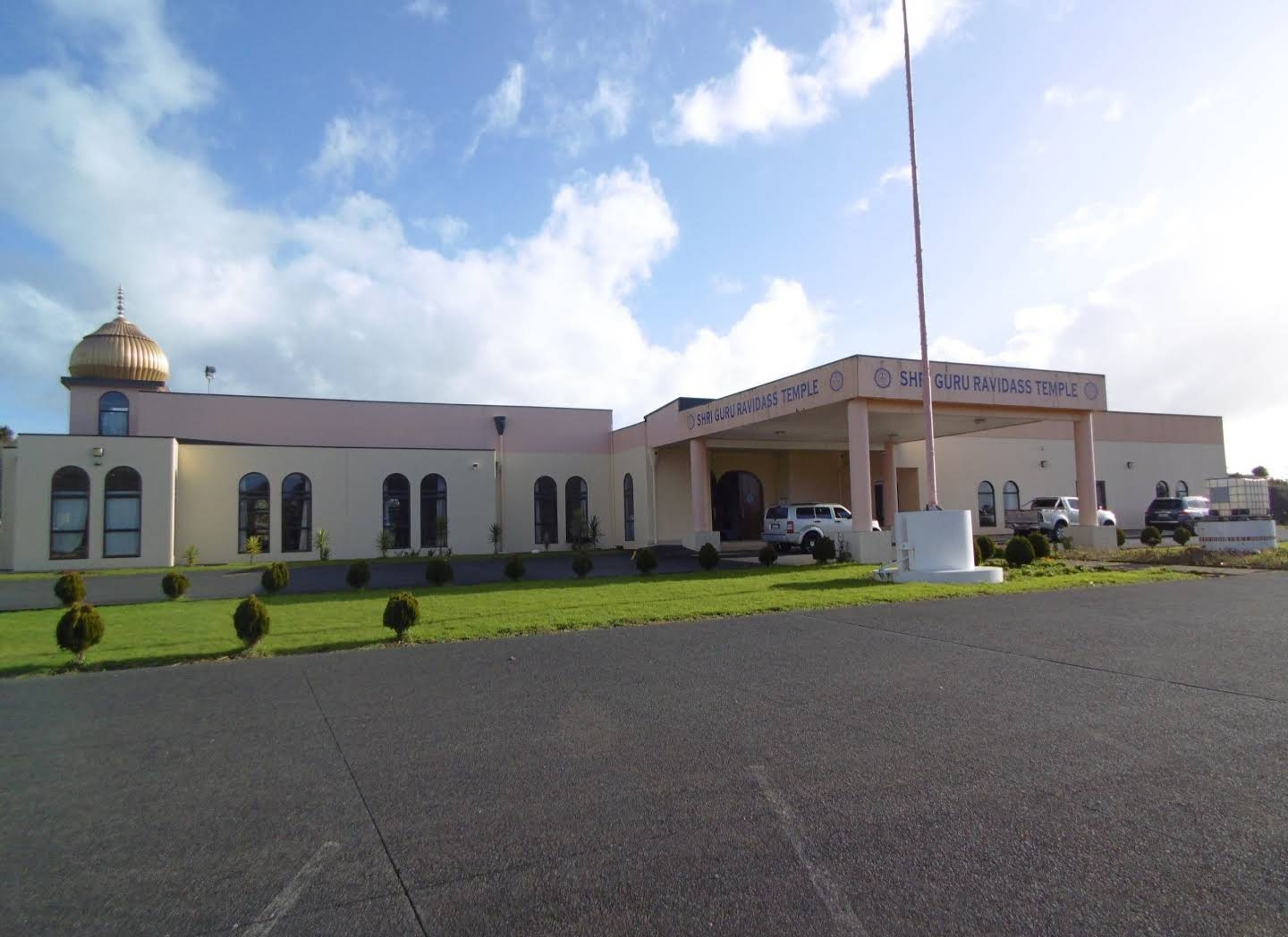
Gurdwara Guru Ravidass Temple, Auckland

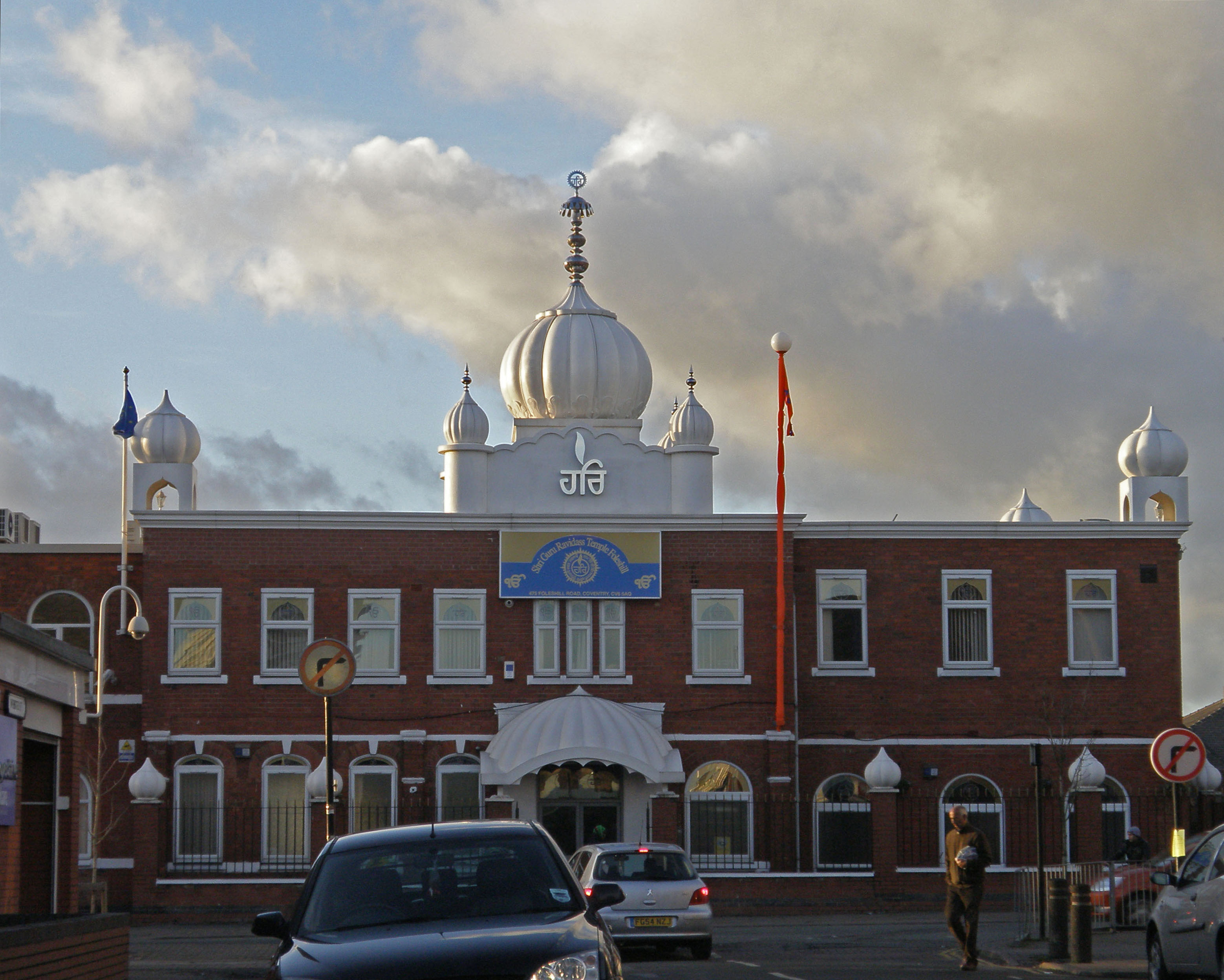
Shri Guru Ravidass Temple in the UK

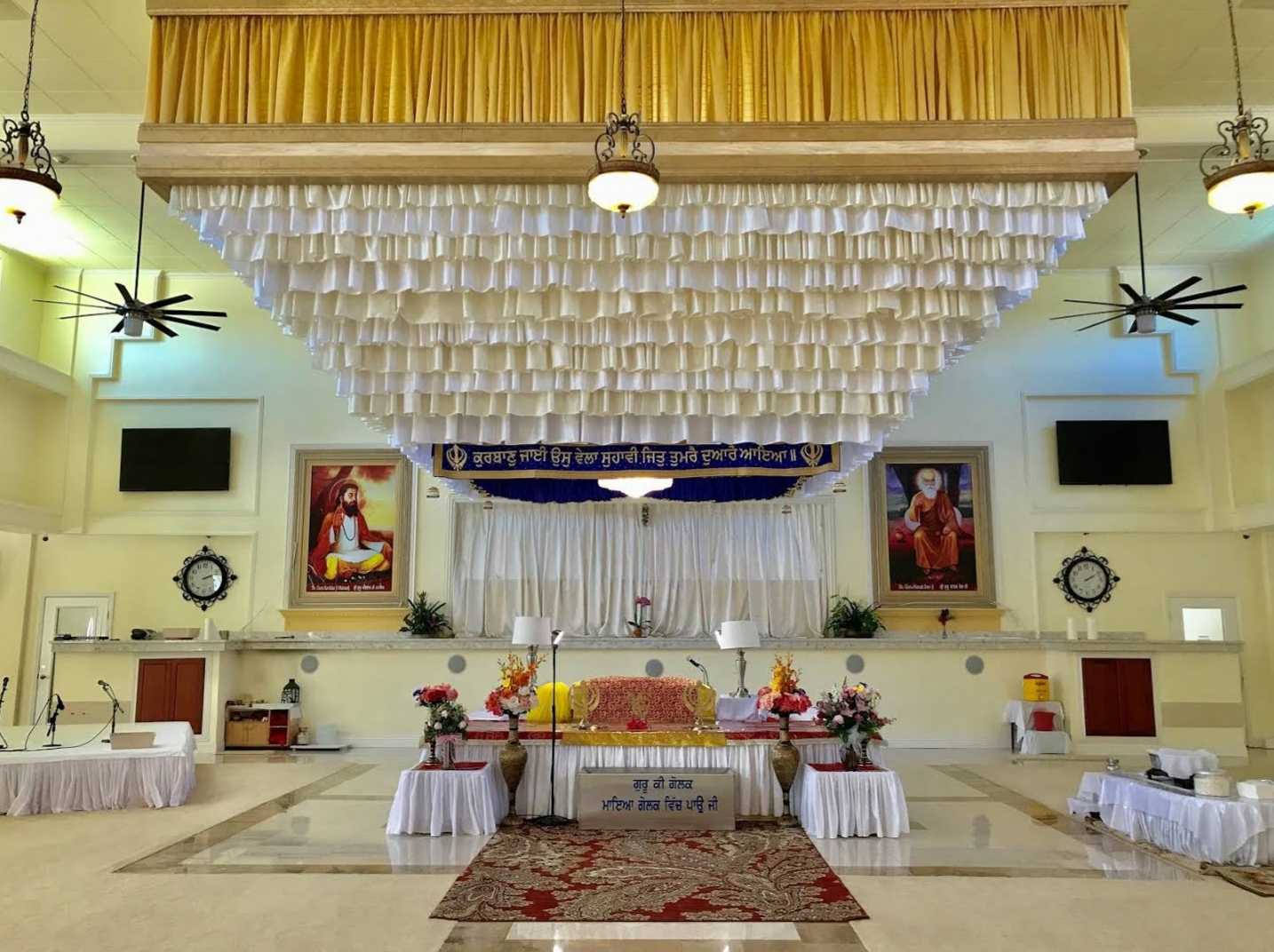
Gurdwara Guru Ravidass Temple, Pittsburg, California

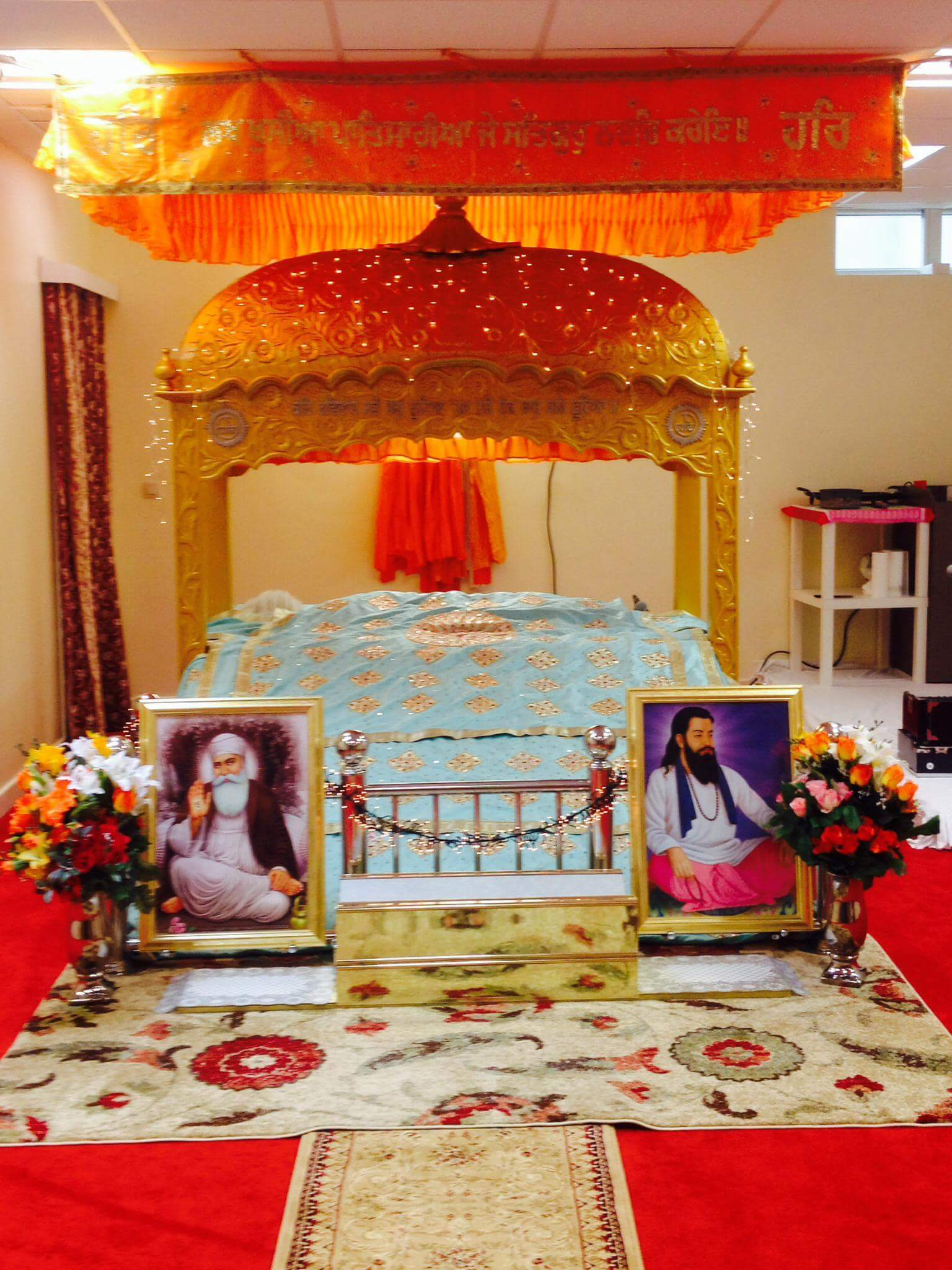
Gurdwara Guru Ravidass Sabha, Oostende

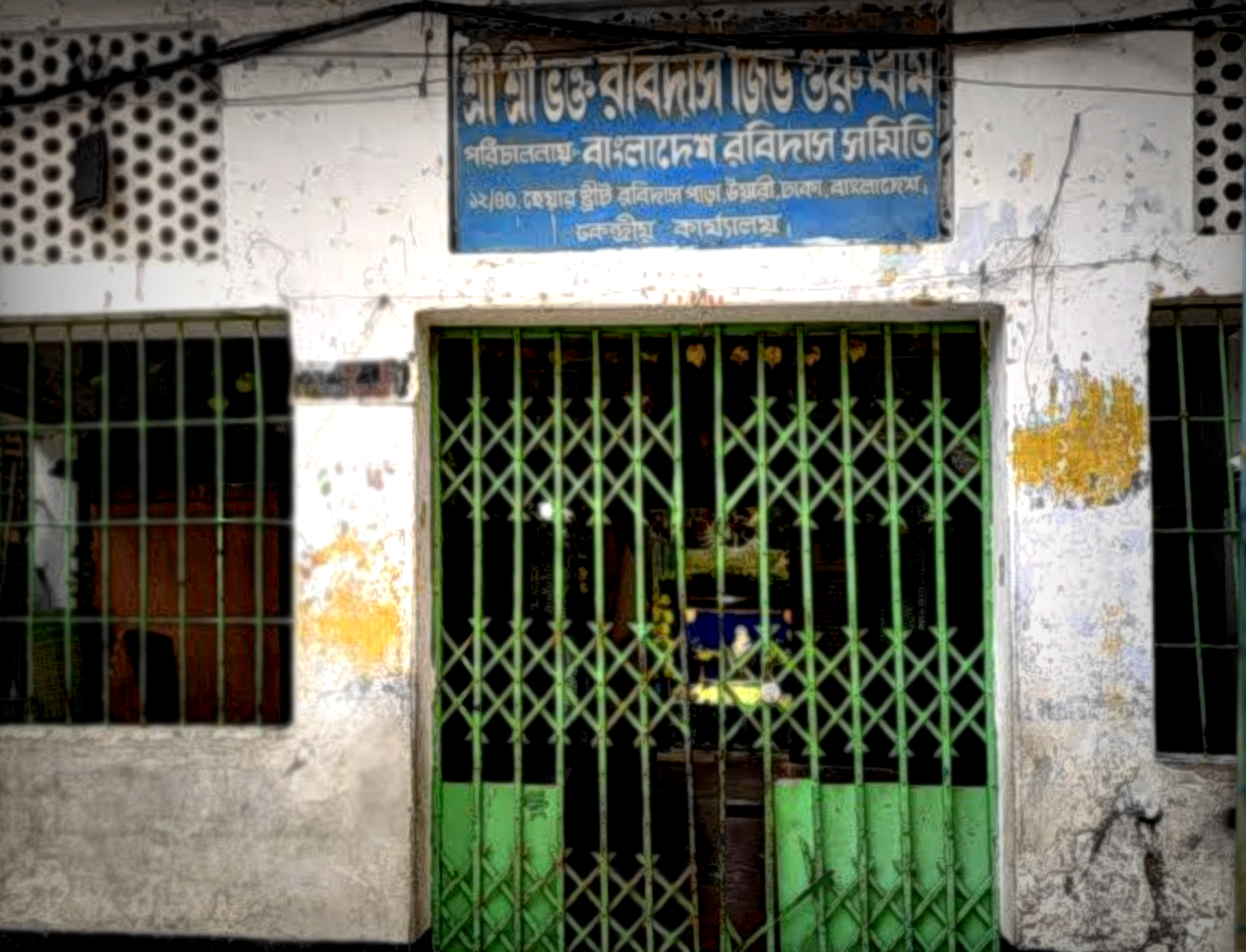
Bangladesh Ravidassia Association, Dhaka

== Demographics ==
State, U.T	Population	Population %	Notes
Bihar	4,900,048	4.7%	Counted along Rabidas, Rohidas, Chamar, Charamakar
Chandigarh	59,957	5.68%	Counted along with other caste synonyms such as Chamars, Ramdasi, Ravidasi, Raigar and Jatia
Chhattisgarh	2,318,964	9.07%	Counted as Chamar, Satnami, Ahirwar, Raidas, Rohidas, Jatav, Bhambi and Surjyabanshi
NCT of Delhi	1,075,569	6.4%	Counted along with other caste synonyms such as Jatav, Chamars, Ramdasia, Ravidasi, Raigar and Jatia
Gujarat	1,032,128	1.7%	Counted along with other caste synonyms such as Chamar, Bhambi, Asadaru, Chambhar, Haralaya, Rohidas, Rohit, Samgar
Haryana	2,429,137	9.58%	Counted along with other caste synonyms such as Jatav, Chamars, Ramdasia, Ravidasi, Raigar and Jatia
Himachal Pradesh	458,838	6.68%	Counted along with other caste synonyms such as Chamars, Ramdasia, Raigar and Jatia
Jammu and Kashmir	212,032	1.72%	Counted along with other caste synonyms such as Chamars, Ramdasia, Rohidas
Jharkhand	1,008,507	3.05%	Counted as Chamar, Mochi
Karnataka	605,486	1%	Counted as Rohidas, Rohit, Samgar, Haralaya, Chambhar, Chamar, Bhambi
Madhya Pradesh	5,368,217	7.39%	Counted as Chamar, Jatav, Bairwa, Bhambi, Rohidas, Raidas, Ahirwar, Satnami, Ramnami, Surjyabanshi
Maharashtra	1,411,072	1.25%	Counted as Rohidas, Chamar, Chambhar, Bhambi, Satnami, Ramnami, Haralaya, Rohit, Samagar, Bhambi
Punjab	3,095,324	11.15%	During the 2011 census in Punjab, 1017192 people were counted as addharmi in a separate caste cluster, which is another term for Ravidassias. In the same census, the Ravidassias cluster population was 2078132, and both clusters together made a population of 3095324 in Punjab, which is an 11.15% population of Punjab.
Rajasthan	2,491,551	3.63%	Counted along with other caste synonyms such as Chamars, Bhambi, Ramdasia, Ravidasi, Raigar, Haralaya, Chambhar and Jatia
Uttarakhand	548,813	5.44%	Counted as Chamar, Jatava, Dhusia, Jhusia
Uttar Pradesh	22,496,047	11.25%	Counted as Chamar, Jatava, Dhusia, Jhusia
West Bengal	1,039,591	1.13%	Counted as Chamar, Rabidas, Charamakar, Rishi

== Notable Ravidassia ==
=== Religious figures ===
- Guru Ravidas, was an Indian mystic poet-saint of the bhakti movement during the 15th to 16th century CE
- Giani Ditt Singh - Co Founder - Singh Sabha Movement, First professor of Punjabi Language.

=== Politicians ===
- Kanshi Ram - Founder of Bahujan Samaj Party.
- Babu Jagjivan Ram - Former Deputy Prime Minister of India.
- Meira Kumar - Former Diplomat and 15th Speaker of the Lok Sabha.
- Som Parkash - Union Minister of State for Commerce and Industry, Government of India.
- Vijay Sampla - Former Minister of State for Social Justice and Empowerment in India.
- Mohinder Singh Kaypee - Former Member Parliament, Jalandhar.
- Santokh Singh Chaudhary - Former Member Parliament.
- Sushil Kumar Rinku - Member Parliament, Jalandhar.
- Selja Kumari - Former Minister of Social Justice and Empowerment and Tourism in the Government of India.
- Rattan Lal Kataria - Former Minister of State in the Ministry of Jal Shakti and Ministry of Social Justice and Empowerment.

==== Britain ====
- Chaman Lal - First British Indian Lord Mayor of Europe's largest council, Birmingham City Council.
- Ram Parkash Lakha - Former Lord Mayor of Coventry.
- Mohinder Kaur Midha - Former Mayor of the London Borough of Ealing.
- Bishan Dass - Elected as first British Asian Lord Mayor of Wolverhampton in 1986.

==== Punjab State ====
- Charanjit Singh Channi - Former Chief Minister of Punjab.
- Kulwant Singh - Member of Legislative Assembly from SAS Nagar and is the first Mayor of Mohali (Punjab).
- Vikramjit Singh Chaudhary - M.L.A from Phillaur Assembly constituency in the Punjab Legislative Assembly.
- Sheetal Angural - M.L.A from Jalandhar West Assembly constituency in the Punjab Legislative Assembly.
- Gurdev Singh Mann - M.L.A from Nabha Assembly constituency in the Punjab Legislative Assembly.
- Raj Kumar Chabbewal - M.L.A from Chabbewal Assembly constituency in the Punjab Legislative Assembly.
- Ravjot Singh - M.L.A from Sham Chaurasi Assembly constituency in the Punjab Legislative Assembly.
- Nachhatar Pal - M.L.A from Nawan Shahr Assembly constituency in the Punjab Legislative Assembly.
- Sukhwinder Singh Kotli - M.L.A from Adampur, Punjab Assembly constituency in the Punjab Legislative Assembly.
- Sarwan Singh Phillaur - Former Minister for Jails, Tourism, Cultural Affairs and Printing and Stationery in the Punjab Government and 6 time M.L.A.
- Pawan Kumar Tinu - Former member of Punjab Legislative Assembly from Adampur.
- Chaudhary Jagjit Singh - Former Cabinet Minister of Punjab for Labour and Employment and also Minister of State for Housing and Urban Development.
- Des Raj Dhugga - Former M.L.A in Punjab Legislative Assembly.
- Baldev Singh Khaira - Former M.L.A from Phillaur Assembly constituency.

=== Art and literature ===
- Amar Singh Chamkila - Punjabi Singer.
- Miss Pooja - Punjabi Singer.
- Niharika Singh Indian actress, producer and beauty pageant titleholder who won Miss Earth India 2005 and represented her country at Miss Earth 2005.

=== Civil servants ===
- Lahori Ram - First Indo-American to be appointed as the Economic Development Commissioner of California.
- Satnam Rattu - Indian origin judge of the Superior Court of Sacramento County in California.
- Neetu Badhan Smith - First Sikh woman judge in the United States.

== Locations associated with the Ravidassia ==
- Shri Guru Ravidas Janam Asthan
- Shri Khuralgarh Sahib
- Shri Guru Ravidas Gurughar, Tughlakabad
- Sant Ravidas Ghat

== See also ==
- Dera Sach Khand
- Sant Mat
- Bhakti movement
- Ramdasia
- Jatav
- Ravived
- Chambhar
