= Amritbani =

Amritbani may refer to:

- Sikh scriptures
- Amritbani Satguru Ravidas Maharaj Ji, the scripture of the Ravidassia religion
