= Dera Sach Khand =

Indian socio-religious organization

Dera Sachkhand Ballan
- ਡੇਰਾ ਸੱਚ ਖੰਡ ਬੱਲਾਂ
- Dera Sach Khand Ballan logo
- Abbreviation: DSB
- Formation: c. 1900
- Headquarters: Dera Sach Khand, Punjab, India
- Founder: Sant Pipal Das
- Gaddi Nashin (leader): Sant Niranjan Das

Dera Sach Khand Ballan (Punjabi: ਡੇਰਾ ਸਚ ਖੰਡ ਬੱਲਾਂ (Gurmukhi); ڈیرہ پالیسیاں کان بالا (Shahmukhi)), also known as Dera Sant Sarwan Das or Dera Ballan, is a Ravidassia dera based in the village of Ballan near Jalandhar, Punjab, India. It was founded by Pipal Dass soon after 1900, and it played a role in the Ad Dharm movement to popularize the image of Ravidas as a guru. It has since adopted the mission of spreading the teachings of Ravidas and advancing public education and healthcare in India.

For much of its history, Dera Ballan's teaching was based on Sikh scripture including the works of Ravidas. In 2009 in Vienna, Sikh militants attacked a Dera Ballan ceremony, killing a senior official and injuring the then Gaddi Nashin (leader). In the following year on 29 January 2010, the Dera formally established a separate religion, Ravidassia Dharm, and they introduced their new religious text, Amritbani Guru Ravidas.

In addition to its headquarters in Ballan, Dera Sach Khand manages the Shri Guru Ravidas Janam Asthan temple at Seer Goverdhanpur, the Sarwan Dass Charitable Hospital in Jalandhar district, and the Sarwan Dass Model School in Phagwara. The group is prevalent in Punjab, Uttar Pradesh (particularly Varanasi), and parts of North America and Europe.

== History ==
Dera Sach Khand was founded in Ballan, Punjab, India, by Pipal Dass in the early 1900s. Originally named Harnam Dass, Pipal Dass hailed from Gill Patti village in Bathinda District, Punjab. He fathered a son named Sarwan Dass (born 15 February 1895), whose mother, Shobhawanti, died when he was five years old. Pipal Dass and Sarwan Dass then left Gill Patti and eventually arrived at the village of Ballan near Jalandhar. There was a dry pipal tree nearby, and Pipal Dass started watering this tree, which ultimately became green again. Seeing this as an auspicious sign, Pipal Dass persuaded the people of the village to donate the surrounding land to him. Pipal Dass established the Dera there, and it became a central pilgrimage destination for followers of Ravidas in Punjab.

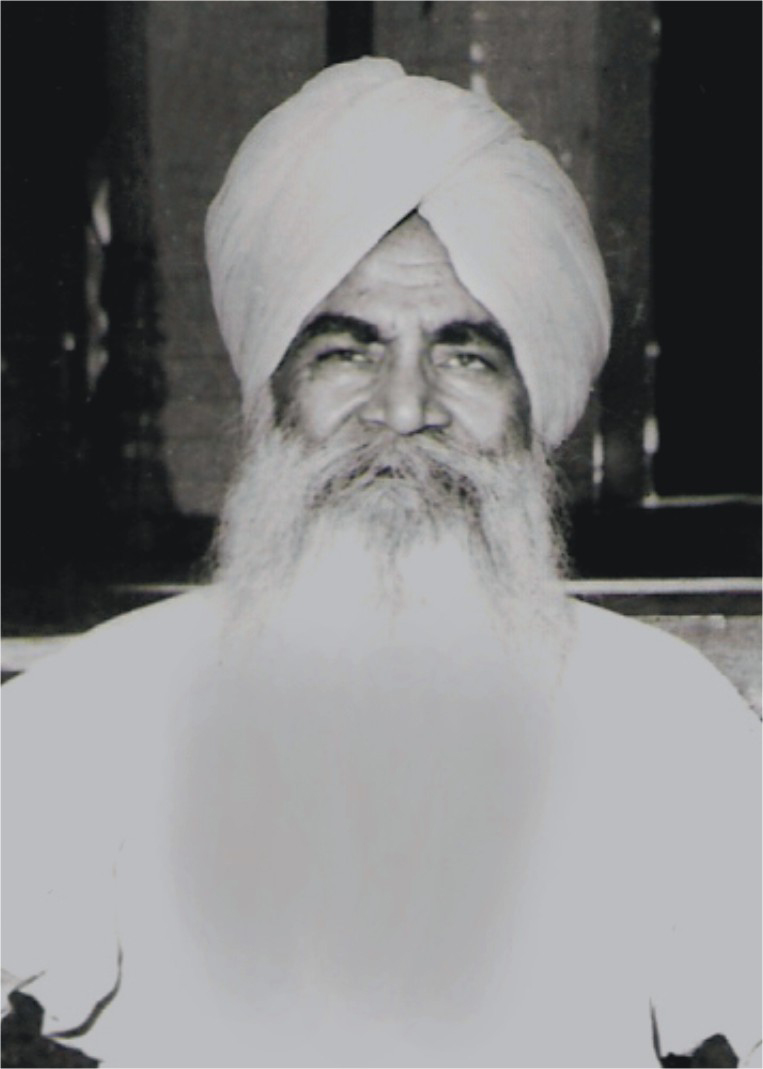
Hari Dass, Gaddi Nashin from June 1972 to February 1982

Pipal Dass died in 1928, and Sarwan Dass became the gaddi nashin (leader) of Dera Ballan. Spreading the teachings of Ravidas among the socially disadvantaged became one of the primary aims of Dera Ballan under his leadership. He laid the foundation stones of multiple Ravidas deras and sponsored the expansion of several institutions of education. Sarwan Dass was concerned with the advancement of public education and healthcare, a goal which helped fuel the Dera's popularity. Sarwan Dass founded a medical center at the Dera for those who could not afford treatment elsewhere, and multiple hospitals were later named after him. He died on 11 June 1972 and was succeeded by Hari Dass.

Garib Dass became Gaddi Nashin on 7 February 1982. Within a year, he founded the Sarwan Dass Charitable Hospital in Adda Kathar, Jalandhar district. Though it started as a small dispensary, it became a fully-fledged hospital in February 1992 with the help of donors from the United Kingdom. Garib Dass also founded the Dera's weekly newspaper, Begumpura Shaher, on 15 August 1991. In 2004, the Indian Dalit Literary Academy gave an award to the newspaper's chief editor, Ramanand Dass, for giving a voice to Dalits, who had been underrepresented in the media.

Niranjan Dass became Gaddi Nashin on 23 July 1994. Under his leadership, Dera Ballan founded the Sarwan Dass Model School at Phagwara, and the school began admitting students in April 2004. He also laid the foundation stone of the Sarwan Dass Charitable Eye Hospital at Ballan on 10 November 2004; it opened on 15 February 2007. Niranjan Dass traveled extensively with his second in command, Ramanand Dass, to visit followers outside of India, and he laid the foundation stones of many Ravidas deras abroad.

On 24 May 2009, during a religious ceremony at a Ravidas temple in Vienna, Austria, Niranjan Dass and Ramanand Dass were the targets of an attack by six men armed with knives and a pistol. Both leaders were injured in the attack, along with fourteen other people. Ramanand Dass died of his injuries early the next day. The attackers were Sikh fundamentalists motivated by a belief that the Dera's leaders had disrespected the Sikh holy book, Guru Granth Sahib. News of the attack on the temple triggered riots in the Punjab, where three people died in clashes with law enforcement and security forces.

Originally, the Guru Granth Sahib was recited in Ravidassia temples, but Dera Sach Khand ended this tradition after the attack in Vienna, and began to only read the 41 works by Ravidas that are included in the Granth. On 29 January 2010, Niranjan Dass formally announced the formation of the Dera's new religion, Ravidassia Dharm, at Seer Goverdhanpur in Varanasi, the birthplace of Ravidas. The Dera also introduced its new religious text, Amritbani Guru Ravidas, which contains 240 hymns attributed to Ravidas, including the ones found in the Granth. A dera based in Chak Hakim village near Phagwara alleged that most of the additional hymns were actually written by Hira Dass in 1908, a claim Dera Ballan denied.

=== Role in Ad Dharm movement ===
According to the researcher Ronki Ram, the Ad Dharm (ancient faith) movement started in 1925 to "fight against the system of untouchability" in India, and it "played a historic role in the formation of Dalit consciousness in Punjab". The movement was founded by Mangu Ram, who visited Pipal Dass in its early stages for information about Ravidas's teachings and support in compiling them, with the goal of popularizing the guru among Dalits. In 1932, Sarwan Dass gave juice to Mangu Ram to break a fast he took to oppose Mahatma Gandhi's fast against the Communal Award. On 13 December 1970, Dera Ballan hosted a conference for the Ad Dharm movement, whose leaders praised Dera Ballan's efforts in helping the Dalit community.

Opinderjit Takhar writes that "there is no evidence to suggest that there was a following of Guru Ravidas during his lifetime", and she attributes the posthumous recognition of Ravidas as a guru to the efforts of the Ad Dharm. The Ad Dharm movement lost momentum after the first general election in independent India, but deras such as Dera Sach Khand are still popular pilgrimage destinations in Punjab.

== Facilities ==
As of 2012, Dera Ballan's headquarters includes a shrine, a congregation hall, a library, a communal kitchen hall, and charitable medical facilities. The Dera also manages Shri Guru Ravidas Janam Asthan (Temple of Guru Ravidas's Birthplace) at Seer Goverdhanpur, Varanasi; the Sarwan Dass Charitable Hospital in Adda Kathar, Jalandhar district; and the Sarwan Dass Model School in Phagwara, and they support many other deras and educational institutions in the region.

The Dera publishes books on Dalit literature, and awards medals to Dalit scholars – twenty had been honored this way by 2008. The Dera also publishes audio-visual media such as CDs, DVDs, and tapes to spread the philosophy of Ravidas. Its weekly newspaper, Begumpura Shaher, is written in English, Hindi, and Punjabi.

Shri Guru Ravidas Janam Asthan is a temple at Seer Goverdhanpur in the city of Varanasi. Millions of devotees gather there for Ravidas's birthday each year. The leaders of Dera Ballan determined that Ravidas had been born in that locale, and one of them, Hari Dass, laid the temple's foundation stone on 14 June 1965. Dera Ballan provided funding for the temple's construction, which was completed in 1994 with the help of people from India and other countries.

== See also ==
- Sant Mat
- Adi Dharm
