= Guru Ravidass Jayanti =

Indian religious festival

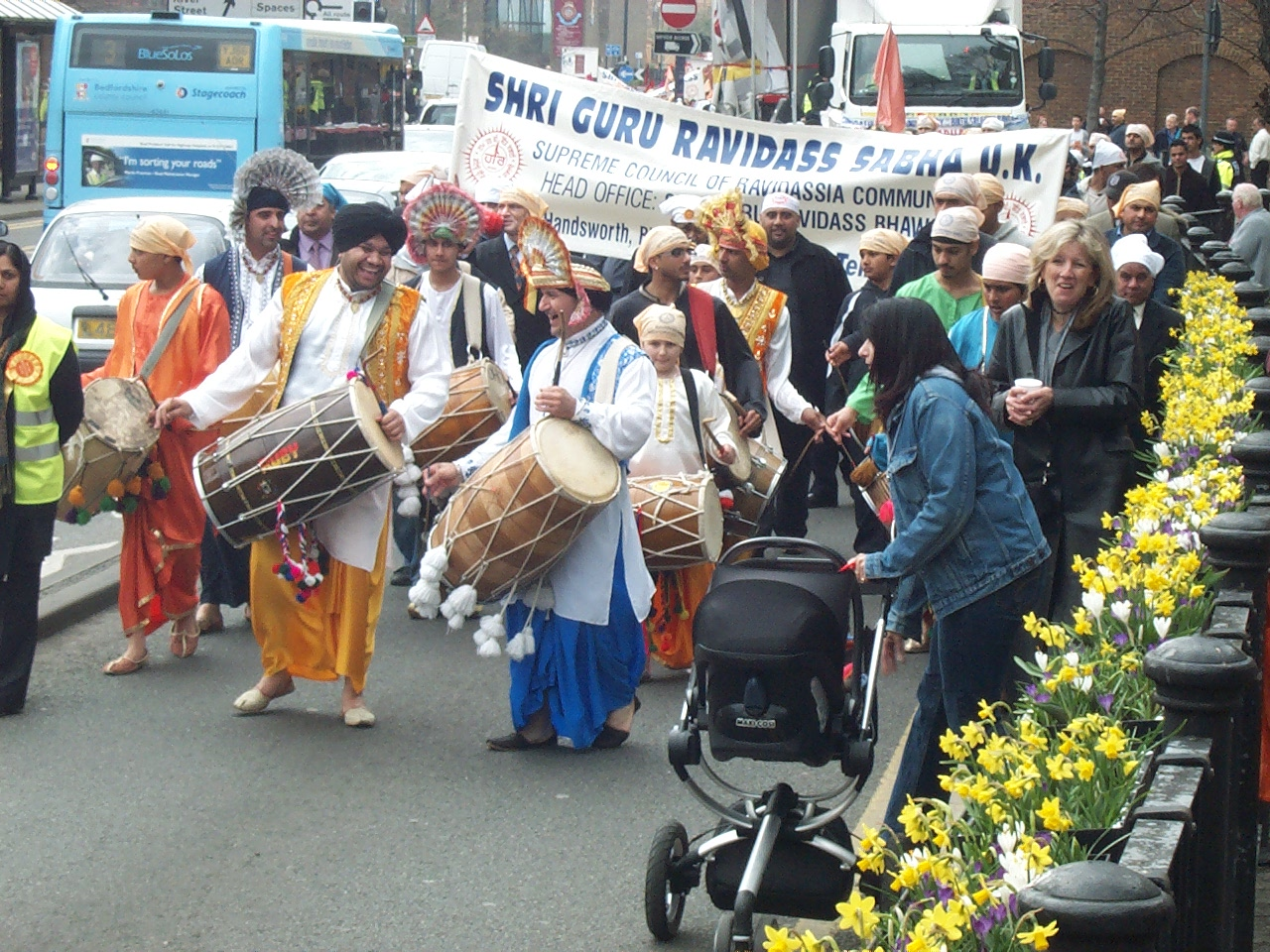
- Procession of Ravidassias in Bedford
- Observed by: Ravidassias
- Type: Religious, cultural
- Significance: Commemoration of the birth of Ravidas
- Celebrations: Gurudwaras are decorated, and prayers are organised. Guru Granth Sahib is read across the country. Devotees dress in the manner as Ravidas.
- Date: Purnima Tithi (Full Moon day) in the month of Magh
- 2025 date: 12 February 2025
- Frequency: Annual

Guru Ravidass Jayanti is the birthday of Ravidas, celebrated on Magh Purnima, the full moon day in the month of Magh month. It is the annual focal point for the festival in India; People across countries celebrate this special occasion in India. Also, devotees take a holy dip in the river to perform rites. The 2020 date for the Jayanti was 9 February, and the 2021 date was 16 February.

He is known as a spiritual man and also as a social reformer because of his work against casteism. He was contemporary to saint Kabir.

== Birth ==
Guru Ravidas was born in the village Seer Goverdhanpur. He was contemporary to Bhagat Kabir, and has a number of recorded interactions with Kabir Ji on spirituality.

== Celebration ==
Ravidas' birth is celebrated as Guru Ravidass Jayanti in Punjab. He is revered due to his spirituality and works against casteism like other 10 Sikh gurus. On this day, his followers bathe in the holy rivers. Then, they take inspiration from their Ravidas by remembering the great events and miracles related to his life. His devotees go to his place of birth and celebrate his birthday on Ravidas Jayanti.

== Significance ==
Guru Ravidass Jayanti marks the birth of Ravidas, who is well-known for making efforts in eradicating caste system. He has also contributed to the Bhakti movement, and is well-recognized as a good friend of Kabir. Mirabai was his disciple.

== Gallery ==
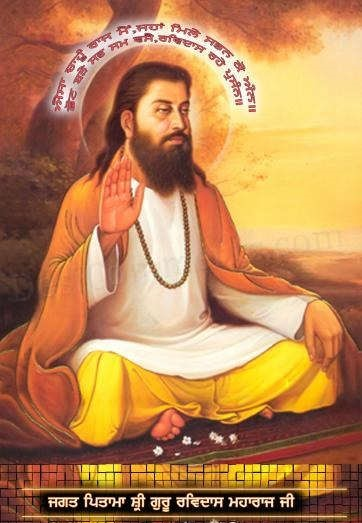

== See also ==
- Kabir Jayanti
- Guru Nanak Gurpurab
- Gurpurb
