= Ramanand Dass =

Indian religious leader (1952–2009)

Sant Ramanand Dass
- Title: Sant Of Ravidassia Religion

Personal life
- Born: February 2, 1952 Ramdaspur, Alawalpur
- Died: May 25, 2009 (aged 57) Rudolfsheim, Vienna, Austria
- Other name: Hindi: संत रामानंद

Religious life
- Religion: Ravidassia Religion

Senior posting
- Post: Sant
- Period in office: 1973-74 to 2009
- Website: Guru Ravidass Ji Website

Sant Ramanand Dass was a leader of Dera Sach Khand, a socio-religious organization founded by followers of Guru Ravidas. His name came to international attention when he was murdered by Sikh radicals at the age of 57 in the 24 May 2009 attack on the Guru Ravidass Temple in Austria.

== Biography ==
Ramanand Dass was born on 2 February 1952, and he resided at Dera Sach Khand from 1973 onwards, according to RavidassGuru.com. He was the chief editor of Dera Sach Khand's weekly newspaper, Begumpura Shaher, and he received the 20th National Dalit Literary Award from the Indian Dalit Literary Academy in 2004. He was second in command to Dera Sach Khand's current leader, Niranjan Dass, with whom he traveled abroad.

On 24 May 2009, Ramanand Dass was injured in an attack by six Sikh militants at a temple in Vienna, Austria. He suffered multiple gunshot wounds, and he died in a hospital early the next day. The attack triggered rioting across much of northern India. He was cremated with full state honors on 4 June 2009, at Dera Sach Khand, India.
