= Shri Guru Ravidas Janam Asthan =

Indian shrine for Ravidassis

Coordinates: 25.2565696°N 82.9987619°E

Religion
- Affiliation: Ravidassia

Location
- Location: Sir Gobardhan, Varanasi, Uttar Pradesh, India
- Interactive map of Shri Guru Ravidas Janam Asthan

Architecture
- Style: Mughal architecture
- Groundbreaking: 14 June 1965
- Completed: 1972 (initial structure), 1994 (current structure)

Shri Guru Ravidas Janam Asthan is a temple located in Sir Gobardhan, Varanasi, Uttar Pradesh, India. It was built to mark the birthplace of Ravidas, and it is an important cultural and religious site for Dalits, Ravidasis, Ad-Dharmis, and Ramdasia Sikhs. Millions of devotees gather there for Ravidas's birthday each year.

== History ==
In the mid-1960s, the leaders of Dera Ballan began an effort to build a place of pilgrimage at the birthplace of Ravidas. They determined that Ravidas had been born in Sir Gobardhan, and one of them, Hari Dass, laid the foundation stone for this temple on 14 June 1965 while Sarwan Dass was the head of the Dera. Dera Ballan provided funding for the first phase of the temple's construction – a small shrine was built at the site in 1972. The more impressive current structure was completed in 1994 with the help of people from India and other countries, especially overseas devotees who donated through a trust formed by Dera Ballan in 1983. Kanshi Ram, founder of the Bahujan Samaj Party (BSP), ceremoniously installed the temple's golden dome.

During the temple's construction, Dera Ballan's ownership of the temple through a trust was disputed by the All India Adi-Dharm Mission based in New Delhi. Dera Ballan responded with legal action, and they documented the ceremonies they organized at the temple to prove their ownership of it.

On 25 May 1997, Kanshi Ram laid the foundation stone of the huge monumental gate, Guru Ravidas Gate, which leads to the temple. K. R. Narayanan, then President of India, performed the opening ceremony of the gate on 16 July 1998. The gate was the destination of a candle march carried out by students from Banaras Hindu University to support natives of Nepal after an earthquake in April 2015.

== Significance ==
Shri Guru Ravidas Janam Asthan is an important cultural and religious site for Dalits, Ad-Dharmis/Ravidasis, and Ramdasia Sikhs. The birth anniversary of Ravidas is celebrated at the temple every year, attracting millions of devotees from India and abroad. The festivities include musical prayer and kirtan. It was at this temple that, on 29 January 2010, Niranjan Dass of Dera Ballan formally announced the formation of the Ravidassia religion. Several politicians, including Prime Minister Narendra Modi, have visited the temple to gain support from followers of Ravidas, who comprise a significant minority of the vote in state elections. Dera Ballan and the All India Adi-Dharm Mission consider Sir Gobardhan to be the birthplace of Ravidas, though some scholars trace his birthplace to Mandoorgarh village, also near Varanasi.

== Gallery ==
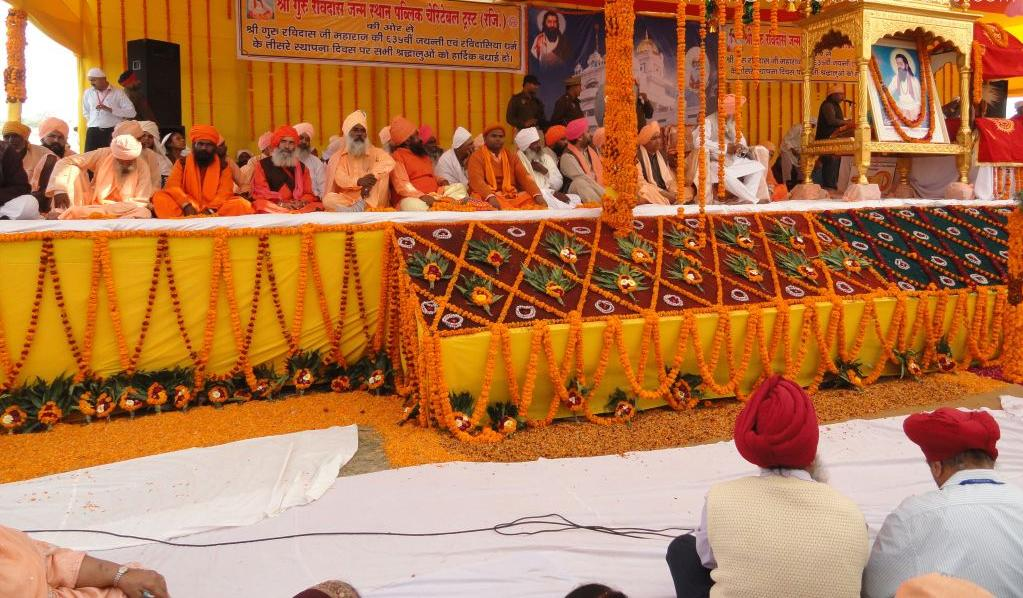
635th Birth Anniversary Celebrations of Guru Ravidas

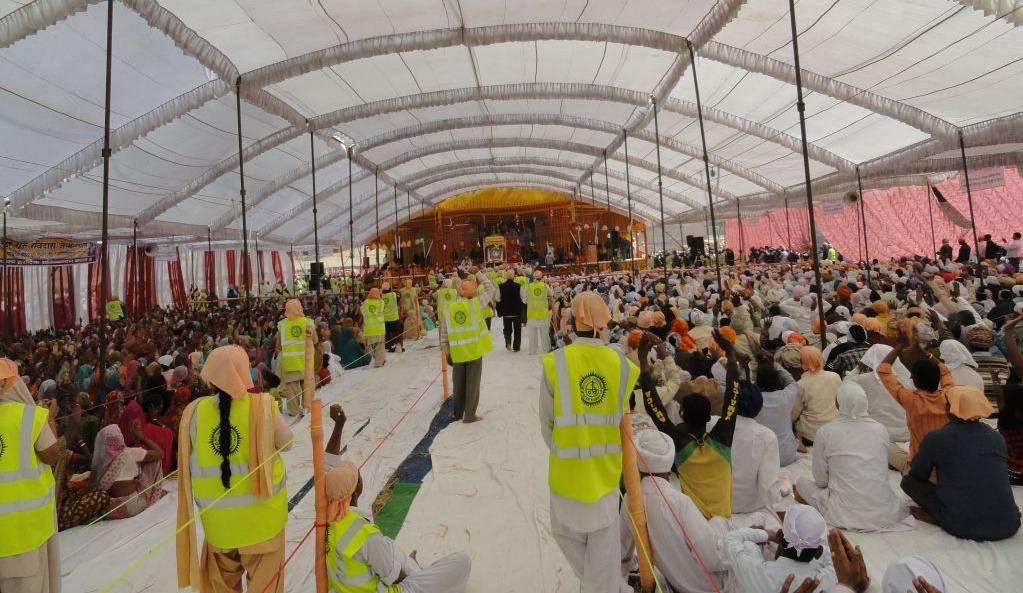
Devotees at Shri Guru Ravidas Janam Asthan

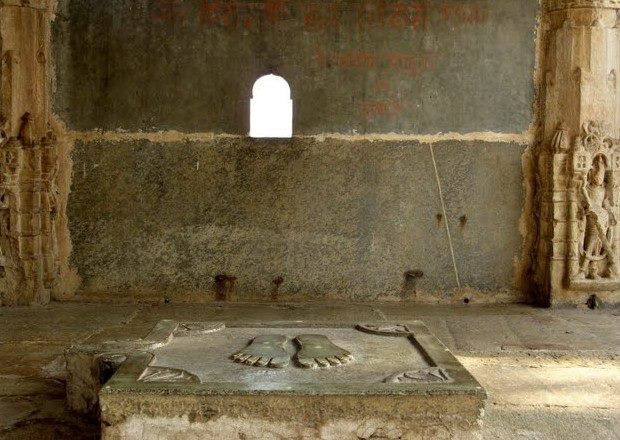
Engraved footprints of Ravidas

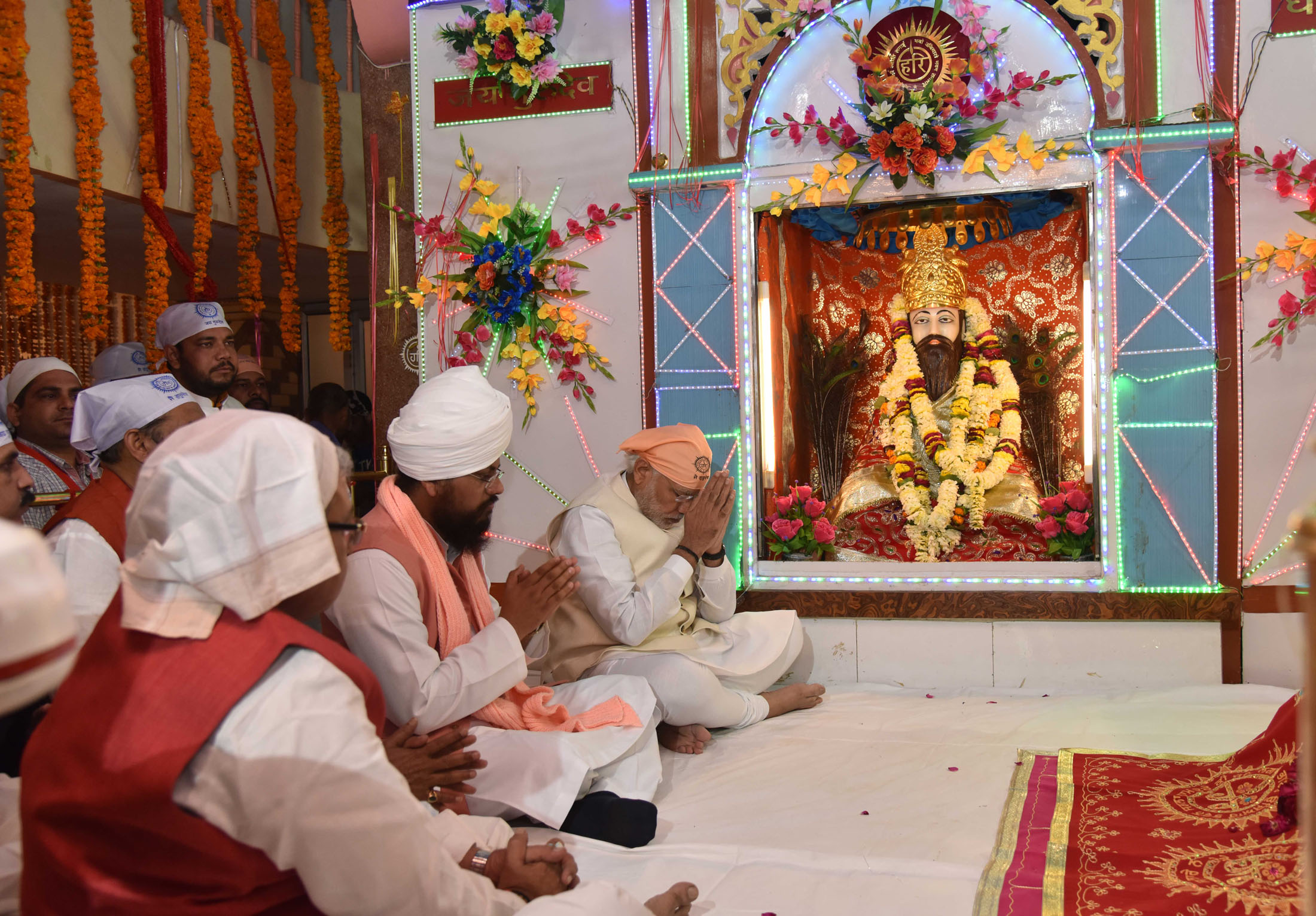
Indian Prime Minister Narendra Modi praying inside the temple

== See also ==
- Minar-e-Begampura, Shri Khuralgarh Sahib
- Shri Guru Ravidas Gurughar
