= List of Scheduled Castes in Rajasthan =

This is a list of the castes in the Indian state of Rajasthan. As per 2011 census of India, Rajasthan has 59 registered Scheduled Caste communities (counted with their sub-groups) with a population of around 12.2 million.

== List ==
1. Adi Dharmi
2. Aheri
3. Badi
4. Bagri, Bagdi
5. Bairwa, Berwa
6. Bajgar
7. Balai
8. Bansphor, Bansphod
9. Baori
10. Bargi, Vargi, Birgi
11. Bawaria
12. Bedia, Beria
13. Bhand
14. Bhangi, Chura, Mehtar, Olgana, Rukhi, Malkana, Halalkhor, Lalbegi, Balmiki, Valmiki, Korar, Zadmalli
15. Bidakia
16. Bola
17. Chamar, Bhambhi, Bambhi, Bhambi, Jatia, Jatav, Jatava, Mochi, Raidas, Rohidas, Regar, Raigar, Ramdasia, Asadaru, Asodi, Chamadia, Chambhar, Chamgar, Haralayya, Harali, Khalpa, Machigar, Mochigar, Madar, Madig, Telegu Mochi, Kamati Mochi, Ranigar, Rohit, Samgar
18. Chandal
19. Dabgar
20. Dhanak, Dhanuk
21. Dhankia
22. Dhobi
23. Dholi
24. Dome, Dom
25. Gandia
26. Garancha, Gancha
27. Garo, Garura, Gurda, Garoda
28. Gavaria
29. Godhi
30. Jingar
31. Kalbelia, Sapera
32. Kamad, Kamadia
33. Kanjar, Kunjar
34. Kapadia Sansi
35. Khangar
36. Khatik
37. Koli, Kori
38. Kooch Band, Kuchband
39. Koria
40. Madari, Bazigar
41. Mahar, Taral, Dhegumegu
42. Mahyavanshi, Dhed, Dheda, Vankar, Maru Vankar
43. Majhabi
44. Mang Garodi, Mang Garudi
45. Mang, Matang, Minimadig
46. Megh, Meghval, Meghwal, Menghvar
47. Mehar
48. Nat, Nut
49. Pasi
50. Rawal
51. Salvi
52. Sansi
53. Santia, Satia
54. Sarbhangi
55. Sargara
56. Singiwala
57. Thori, Nayak
58. Tirgar, Tirbanda
59. Turi

== Demographics ==
Scheduled Caste		Population (2001)		Population (2011)	
SC Code	Caste	Total	% of Total	Total	% of Total
01	Ad Dharmi	308	0.003	412	0.003
02	Aheria	2,748	0.028	5,567	0.045
03	Badi	4,928	0.051	15,833	0.129
04	Bagri, Bagdi	40,911	0.422	64,334	0.526
05	Berwa, Bairwa	931,030	9.604	1,260,686	10.315
06	Bazgar	5,250	0.054	911	0.007
07	Balai	643,189	6.635	708,518	5.797
08	Bansphor	5,908	0.061	9,187	0.075
09	Baori	290,399	2.995	402,513	3.293
10	Bargi	10,739	0.111	12,096	0.099
11	Bawaria	60,121	0.620	62,585	0.512
12	Bedia, Beria	3,092	0.032	4,833	0.039
13	Bhand	18,977	0.196	25,714	0.210
14	Balmiki	375,326	3.871	466,313	3.815
15	Bidakia	70	<0.001	456	0.003
16	Bola	402	0.004	2,397	0.019
17	Chamar, Jatav, Regar	2,465,563	25.433	2,491,551	20.386
18	Chandal	1,344	0.014	1,415	0.012
19	Dabgar	1,969	0.020	3,169	0.026
20	Dhanuk	94,275	0.972	114,159	0.934
21	Dhankia	2,074	0.021	1,447	0.012
22	Dhobi	151,612	1.564	190,273	1.557
23	Dholi	101,589	1.048	134,287	1.099
24	Dome, Dom	3,329	0.034	4,507	0.037
25	Gandia	301	0.003	382	0.003
26	Garancha	6,716	0.069	11,566	0.095
27	Garo, Garoda, Garuda	37,436	0.386	52,652	0.431
28	Gavaria	63,228	0.652	85,741	0.701
29	Godhi	273	0.002	438	0.003
30	Jingar	42,774	0.441	53,540	0.438
31	Kalbelia, Sapera	75,118	0.775	131,911	1.079
32	Kanmeniya, Kamar	8,490	0.087	11,871	0.097
33	Kanjar, Kunjar	37,971	0.392	53,816	0.440
34	Kapadia Sansi	1,257	0.013	2,600	0.021
35	Khangar	6,126	0.063	10,263	0.084
36	Khatik	330,816	3.412	381,447	3.121
37	Koli, Kori	453,074	4.673	539,920	4.418
38	Kuchband	933	0.009	2,921	0.024
39	Koria	394	0.004	1,770	0.014
40	Madari, Taral, Dhegumegu	32,625	0.336	43,860	0.359
41	Mahar	7,241	0.075	1,980	0.016
42	Mahyavanshi, Dhedh, Vankar, Maru Vankar	325	0.003	1,289	0.011
43	Mazhabi	130,649	1.347	158,698	1.298
44	Mang	249	0.002	2,089	0.017
45	Mang Garodi	204	0.002	55	<0.001
46	Meghwal, Megh	2,060,464	21.254	3,060,418	25.041
47	Mehar	52,014	0.536	79,689	0.652
48	Nat, Nut	43,565	0.449	65,904	0.539
49	Pasi	3,188	0.032	4,025	0.033
50	Rawal	26,478	0.273	28,651	0.234
51	Salvi	57,255	0.591	85,719	0.701
52	Sansi	60,365	0.633	86,514	0.708
53	Santia, Satia	9,150	0.094	12,330	0.101
54	Sarbhangi	395	0.004	563	0.004
55	Sargara	113,947	1.175	138,917	1.137
56	Singiwala	5,363	0.055	15,879	0.130
57	Bavariya, Thori	650,373	6.708	839,204	6.866
58	Tirgar, Tirbanda	3,824	0.039	5,273	0.043
59	Turi	3,682	0.038	4,963	0.041
GENERIC CASTES (members who listed them as "Dalit", "Harijan", or "Anusuchit Jati")		153,255	1.581	271,573	2.140
		9,694,462	100%	12,221,593	100%

=== District wise ===
Districts		SC Population		
Name	Population (2011)	Total (2011)	%age	Top 3 (by pop)
Ajmer	25,83,052	4,78,027	18.51	Jatav (169,841); Bairwa (64,383); Koli (41,050)
Alwar	36,74,179	6,53,036	17.77	Jatav (338,966); Bairwa (70,523); Balai (38,887)
Banswara	17,97,485	80,091	4.45	Jatav (26,708); Balai (9,688); Rawal (7,717)
Baran	12,22,755	2,21,184	18.09	Bairwa (56,348); Jatav (50,394); Meghwal (34,319)
Barmer	26,03,751	4,36,414	16.76	Meghwal (336,002); Koli (20,869); Jatav (13,894)
Bharatpur	25,48,462	5,57,305	21.87	Jatav (431,633); Koli (50,201); Balmiki (20,406)
Bhilwara	24,08,523	4,07,957	16.94	Jatav (97,218); Balai (77,671); Bairwa (70,504)
Bikaner	23,63,937	4,93,646	20.88	Meghwal (266,827); Thori (118,337); Balmiki (24,185)
Bundi	11,10,906	2,10,788	18.97	Bairwa (73,052); Meghwal (36,534); Jatav (36,201)
Chittaurgarh	15,44,338	2,50,224	16.20	Jatav (76,411); Meghwal (33,284); Salvi (22,316)
Churu	20,39,547	4,51,421	22.13	Meghwal (232,351); Thori (90,700); Jatav (38,600)
Dausa	16,34,409	3,54,337	21.68	Bairwa (209,766); Koli (59,703); Jatav (43,899)
Dhaulpur	12,06,516	2,45,695	20.36	Jatav (169,399); Koli (29,618); Dhobi (18,976)
Dungarpur	13,88,552	52,267	3.76	Jatav (19,852); Balai (7,515); Meghwal (3,618)
Sri Ganganagar	19,69,168	7,20,412	36.58	Thori (210,766); Meghwal (152,479); Baori (117,959)
Hanumangarh	17,74,692	4,94,189	27.85	Meghwal (166,578); Thori (98,411); Baori (56,480)
Jaipur	66,26,178	10,03,302	15.14	Jatav (275,969); Balai (198,029); Bairwa (174,857)
Jaisalmer	6,69,919	99,134	14.79	Meghwal (82,063); Garoda (3,378); Balmiki (1,718)
Jalore	18,28,730	3,57,196	19.53	Meghwal (223,589); Koli (31,475); Sargara (24,167)
Jhalawar	14,11,129	2,43,582	17.26	Meghwal (77,171); Jatav (39,438); Mehar (33,190)
Jhunjhunu	21,37,045	3,60,709	16.88	Meghwal (209,714); Thori (37,729); Jatav (31,781)
Jodhpur	36,87,165	6,08,024	16.49	Meghwal (358,133); Baori (34,211); Balmiki (25,880)
Karauli	14,58,248	3,54,465	24.31	Jatav (186,100), Bairwa (90,925); Koli (45,248)
Kota	19,51,014	4,05,408	20.78	Bairwa (118,163); Meghwal (73,948); Jatav (39,170)
Nagaur	33,07,743	6,99,911	21.16	Meghwal (337,615); Thori (90,920); Baori (78,324)
Pali	20,37,573	3,98,096	19.54	Meghwal (165,654); Baori (52,775); Sargara (50,111)
Pratapgarh	8,67,848	60,429	6.96	Jatav (16,262); Meghwal (15,310); Balai (4,843)
Rajsamand	11,56,597	1,48,168	12.81	Jatav (31,260); Salvi (27,222); Balai (17,765)
Sawai Madhopur	13,35,551	2,78,789	20.87	Bairwa (159,469); Jatav (58,412); Koli (31,599)
Sikar	26,77,333	4,18,806	15.64	Balai (247,518); Jatav (42,552); Thori (30,258)
Sirohi	10,36,346	2,01,863	19.48	Meghwal (83,141); Koli (45,865); Sargara (22,773)
Tonk	14,21,326	2,87,903	20.26	Bairwa (143,477); Jatav (47,705); Khatik (17,549)
Udaipur	30,68,420	1,88,525	6.14	Meghwal (73,829); Salvi (22,082); Khatik (15,247)

=== Religion wise ===
Scheduled Caste		Religion		
Caste	Population	Hinduism	Sikhism	Buddhism
Ad Dharmi	412	377	16	19
Aheria	5,567	5,563	4	0
Badi	15,833	15,821	12	0
Bagri, Bagdi	64,334	63,834	495	5
Berwa, Bairwa	1,260,686	1,259,646	94	945
Bazgar	911	734	177	0
Balai	708,518	708,394	63	61
Bansphor	9,187	9,186	1	0
Baori	402,513	369,897	32,602	14
Bargi	12,096	12,095	0	1
Bawaria	62,585	62,127	457	1
Bedia, Beria	4,833	4,828	5	0
Bhand	25,714	25,679	34	1
Balmiki, Lal Begi, etc.	466,313	465,739	436	138
Bidakia	456	455	1	0
Bola	2,397	2,394	3	0
Chamar, Jatav, Regar, etc.	2,491,551	2,473,412	13,789	4,350
Chandal	1,415	1,413	0	2
Dabgar	3,169	3,167	2	0
Dhanuk	114,159	114,089	68	2
Dhankia	1,447	1,446	1	0
Dhobi	190,273	190,227	34	12
Dholi	134,287	134,275	11	1
Dome, Dom	4,507	4,501	6	0
Gandia	382	364	18	0
Garancha	11,566	11,558	8	0
Garo, Garoda, Garuda	52,652	52,645	6	1
Gavaria	85,741	83,481	2,526	4
Godhi	438	438	0	0
Jingar	53,540	53,515	23	2
Kalbelia, Sapera	131,911	131,898	9	4
Kanmeniya, Kamar	11,871	11,868	3	0
Kanjar, Kunjar	53,816	53,809	7	0
Kapadia Sansi	2,600	2,349	251	0
Khangar	10,263	10,261	2	0
Khatik	381,447	381,367	54	26
Koli, Kori	539,920	539,660	203	57
Kuchband	2,921	2,931	0	0
Koria	1,770	1,770	0	0
Madari, Taral, Dhegumegu	43,860	31,388	12,471	1
Mahar	1,980	1,800	62	118
Mahyavanshi, Dhedh, Vankar, Maru Vankar	1,289	1,285	4	0
Mazhabi	158,698	11,582	147,108	8
Mang	2,089	2,089	0	0
Mang Garodi	55	55	0	0
Meghwal, Megh	3,060,418	30,58,078	1,804	536
Mehar	79,689	78,809	851	29
Nat, Nut	65,904	65,894	9	1
Pasi	4,025	4,022	3	0
Rawal	28,651	28,646	5	0
Salvi	85,719	85,700	4	15
Sansi	86,514	86,478	35	1
Santia, Satia	12,330	12,328	1	1
Sarbhangi	563	562	1	0
Sargara	138,917	138,897	7	13
Singiwala	15,879	15,856	23	0
Bavariya, Thori	839,204	838,031	1,123	50
Tirgar, Tirbanda	5,273	5,201	70	2
Turi	4,963	4,963	0	0
Generic castes, etc.	271,563	261,117	251	205
	12,221,593	11,999,984	214,837	6,772
