= Performing arts =

Art forms involving live performance

A performance of the ballet Swan Lake

The performing arts are arts such as music, dance, and drama that are performed for an audience. They are different from the visual arts, which produce physical or static objects. Performing arts include a range of disciplines that are performed in front of a live audience, including theatre, music, and dance. Performances may take place in purpose-built buildings, such as theatres and opera houses, as well as in open-air festivals, street settings, and recorded formats like film or television.

Performing arts traditions are present in every society. Music and dance date to prehistoric times, while theatrical forms appear in Ancient Greece, India, and China. Performance served combinations of religious, ceremonial, and entertainment functions. Traditions including Japanese Noh and Kabuki, as well as Indian classical dance, have been recognized by UNESCO as Intangible Cultural Heritage of Humanity.

Western performing arts history spans ancient Greek tragedy and comedy through medieval mystery plays, the emergence of opera and ballet in the Renaissance, and the Romantic expansion of grand opera. In the modernist revolutions of the early 20th century, figures such as Isadora Duncan, Konstantin Stanislavski, and Sergei Diaghilev reworked the principles of dance and theatre. Postmodern performance increasingly challenges the boundaries between disciplines.

Live performances before an audience are a form of entertainment. The development of audio and video recording has allowed for private consumption of the performing arts. In narrative performance, characters express emotions.

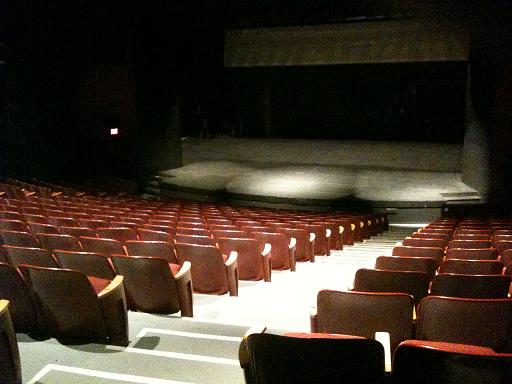
McKenna Theatre Stage

== Types ==
=== Theatre ===
Theatre is the branch of performing arts concerned with acting out stories in front of an audience, using combinations of speech, gesture, music, dance, and spectacle. It is linked to ritual in ancient cultures across the world.

The most familiar form of theatre is the scripted play, in which actors portray characters in a narrative unfolding in real time before an audience. Theatre diversified into two forms: musicals, integrating song and dance; and opera, with all the words set to music. In improvisational theatre, actors invent material instead of following a set script, while performance art explores other disciplines to understand cultural intersections.

The relationship between performers and audience has varied from formal and distant proscenium productions to more intimate formats, including thrust stages, black box theatre, environmental theatre, and even found space adapted from a nontheatrical location. Spatial setup shapes the nature of a performance.

=== Dance ===
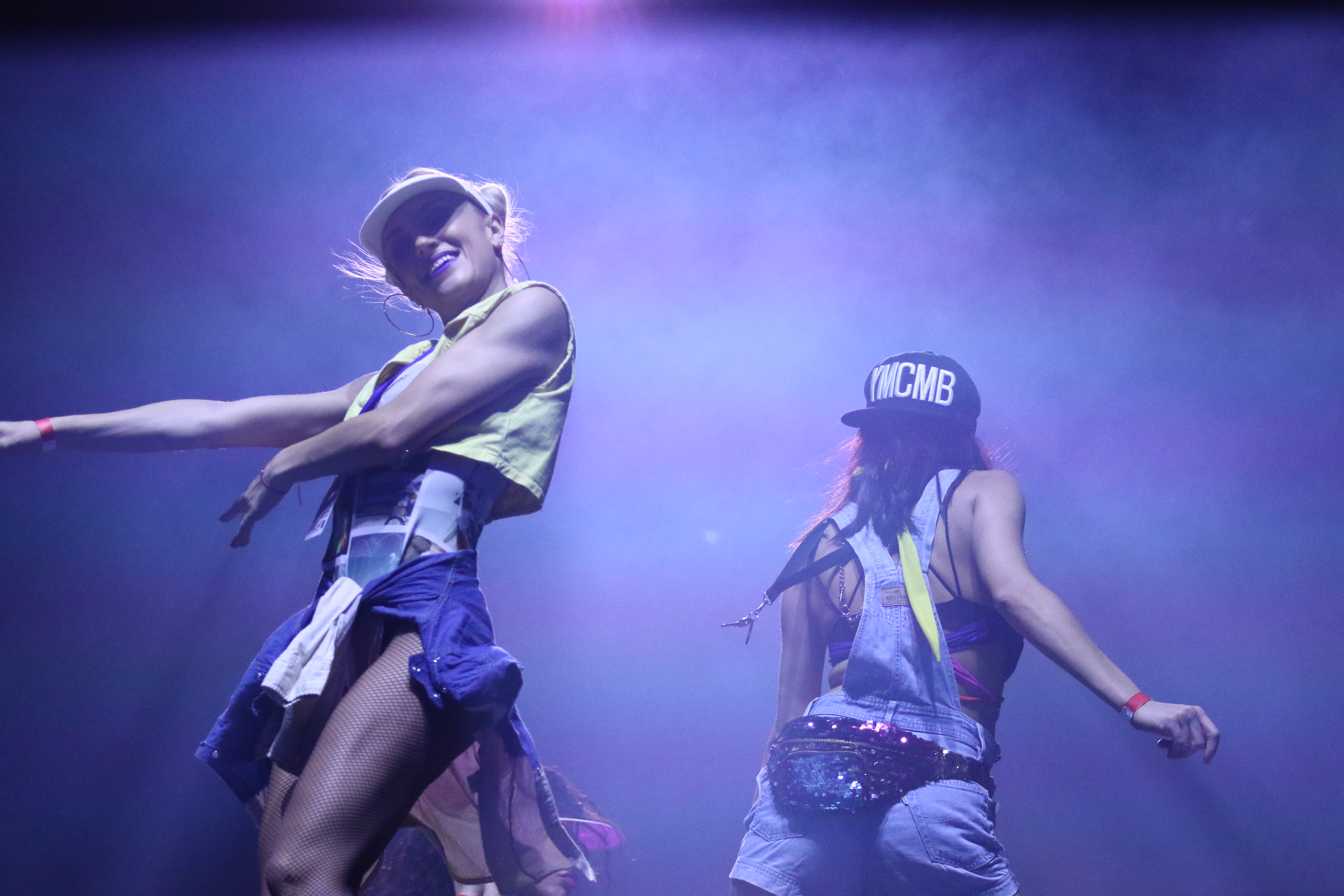
Two female dancers in Sofia, Bulgaria

In the context of performing arts, dance generally refers to human movement, typically rhythmic and to music, used as a form of audience entertainment in a performance setting. Definitions of dance are culturally contingent and range from functional forms such as folk dance to codified virtuoso techniques such as ballet.

Choreography is the art of composing dances, while choreographers arrange movements to communicate artistic ideas and meaning. Dance serves both social and artistic functions. It features in ceremonies, rituals, customs, and celebrations. In Black and Indigenous communities, dance is often inseparable from music and communal ritual.

Modern dance emerged as a 20th-century response to ballet strictures, emphasizing freer bodily movement and self-expression. Dance forms such as hip-hop dance, contemporary dance, and postmodern dance have continued to broaden approaches to movement, choreography, and performance.

=== Music ===
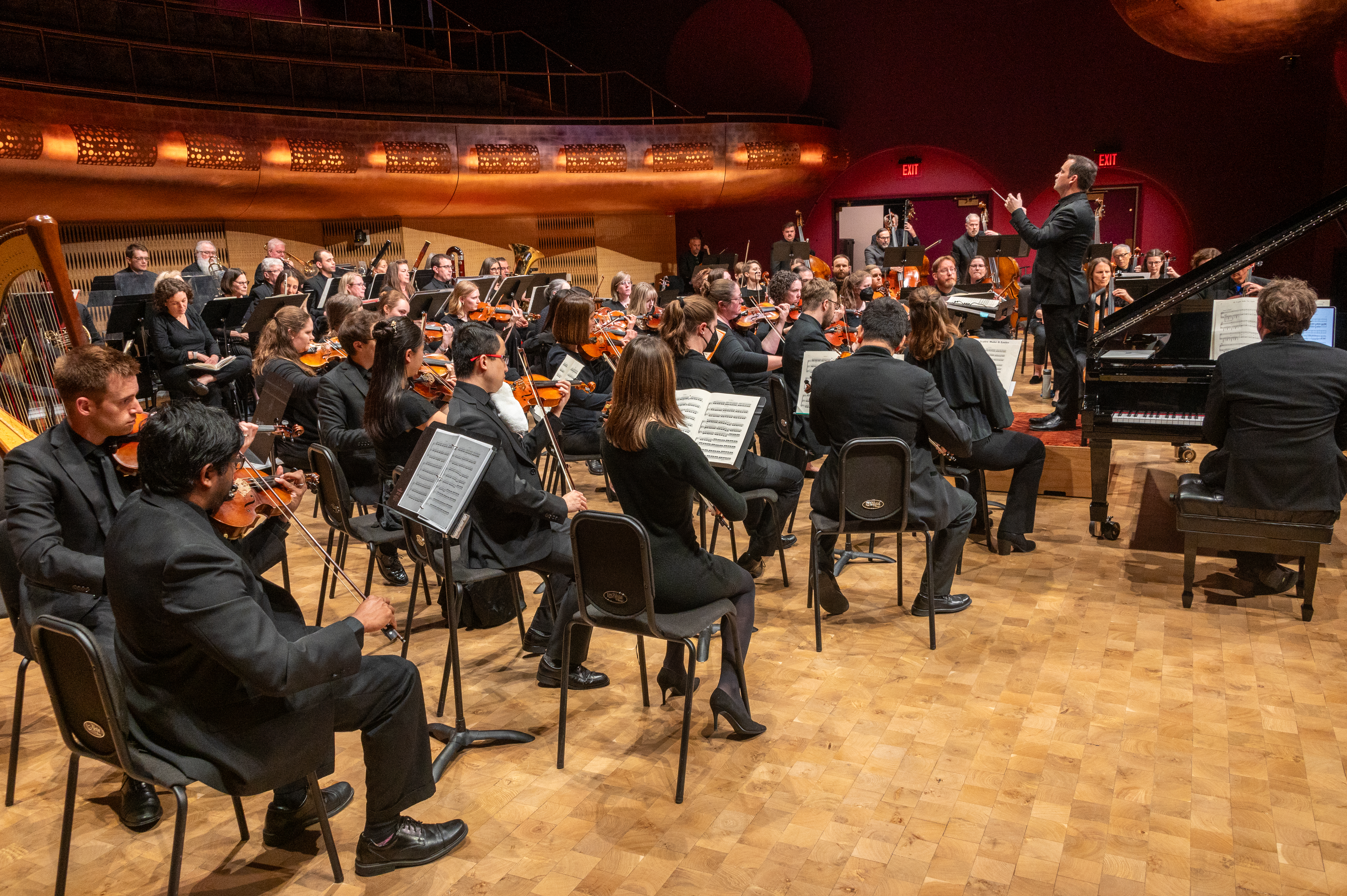
Middleton Community Orchestra Spring 2024 Concert

Music is an art form that uses elements such as timbre, pitch, rhythm, and dynamics to organise sound. It can be performed using a variety of instruments and styles and is divided into genres such as folk, jazz, hip-hop, pop, and rock. As an art form, music can occur in live or recorded formats, and can be planned or improvised.

Jazz combines written arrangements with improvisation, while in classical Western concert music faithful interpretation of the written score is central. Improvisation is central to traditions from around the world including Indian classical music and West African griot singing. In practice, few types of music are wholly composed or improvised.

=== Film ===
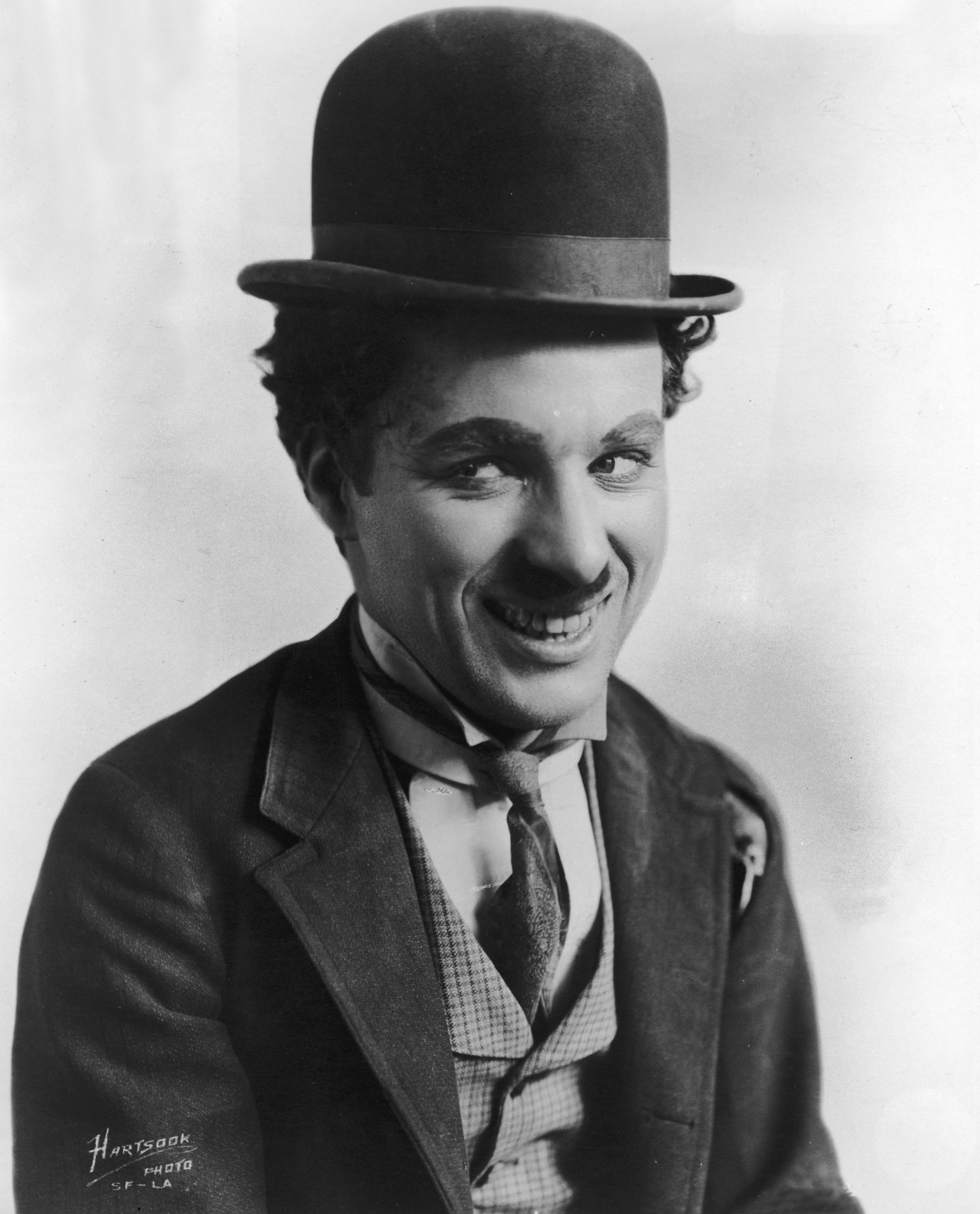
Chaplin in the role of the tramp (1915)

Beginning with early motion-picture technologies such as Thomas Edison's kinetoscope in the 1890s, cinema developed into a mass medium, later shaped by the Hollywood studio system. Film acting differs from stage acting, projecting to a camera rather than to an audience. The performance is then shaped and assembled in editing. Acting on camera often requires subtlety rather than the projection required on stage.

Film has become an umbrella term covering cinema and television, with different film cultures around the world accessible by streaming services. Distinct film cultures in South Asia, East Asia, and elsewhere reach wide audiences.

=== Opera ===
In opera, dramatic stories are primarily conveyed through singing, often accompanied by an orchestra. It combines music, drama, and spectacle into a single art form. Opera originated in Italy at the end of the sixteenth century and spread throughout the world, becoming the prestige entertainment of aristocratic, and later bourgeois, society.

The form ranges from smaller comic operas to spectacular grand opera. Operas by Mozart, Verdi, Wagner, and Puccini remain among the most performed. Wagner's Gesamtkunstwerk concept influenced the modern stage, with artists seeking theatre appealing to all the senses.

=== Other forms ===
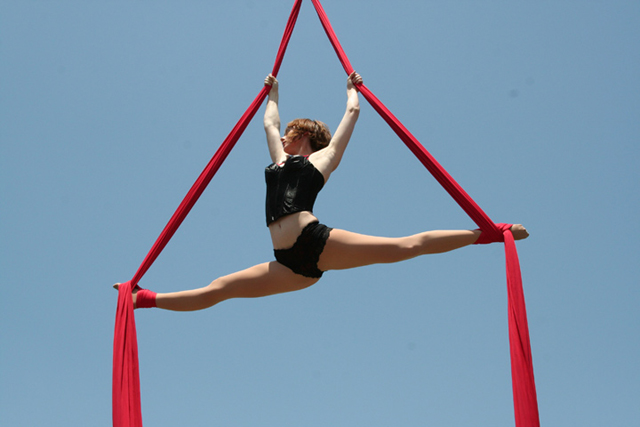
The Aerial Showgirls perform aerial tissu

Circus arts include clowning, acrobatics, aerials, and object manipulation. Ancient Egyptian depictions survive that show acrobatics, which were performed at festive occasions. Contemporary circus combines traditional circus techniques with elements of theatre and storytelling. Cirque du Soleil is a widely recognised example of this performance style.

The broader field of performing arts includes musical theatre, magic, mime, spoken word, puppetry, performance art, improv, and stand-up comedy. Musical theatre and especially the Broadway musical became a dominant theatrical form in the twentieth century. Puppetry encompasses traditions from Indonesian shadow puppetry to Japanese Bunraku to contemporary uses like in The Lion King. Stand-up comedy emerged as a distinct form, developing out of variety shows and moving into clubs with important audience reactions. Performance art grew out of avant-garde movements, using the artist's body and presence to create work that resists conventions.

== History ==
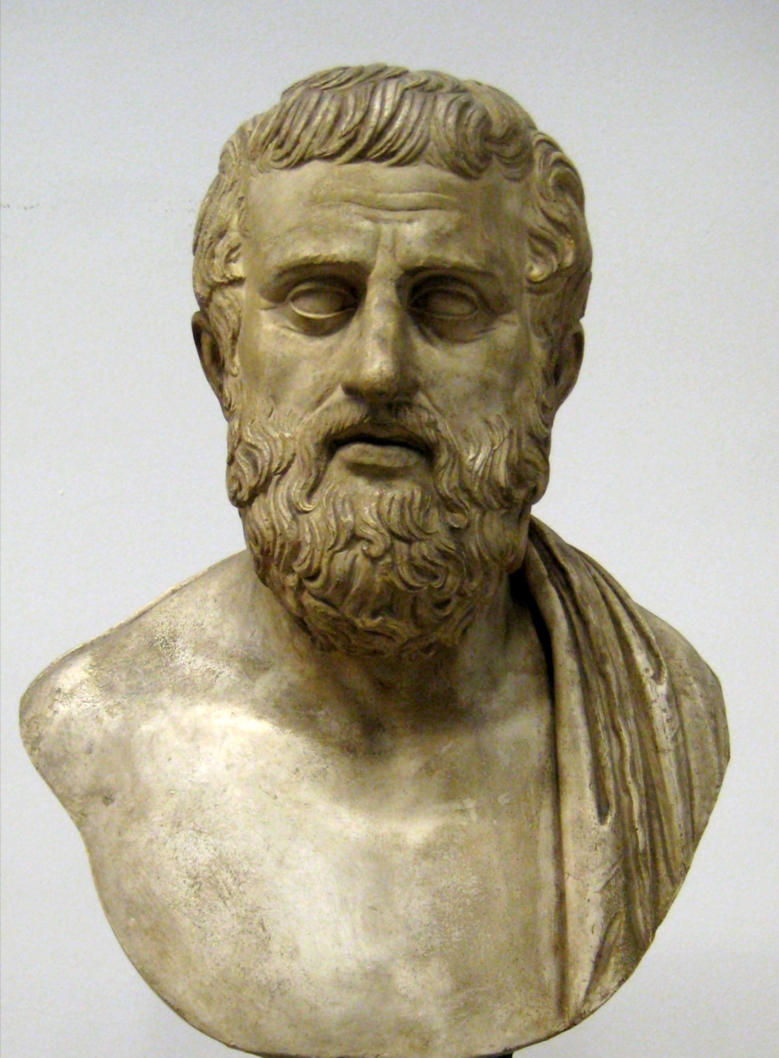
Sophocles

=== Ancient and classical periods ===
As early as the 19th century BCE, a large religious ceremony in Egypt may have had theatre-like elements. The Dramatic Ramesseum Papyrus is an ancient Egyptian text that has been interpreted as an early example of dramatic literature, although its classification as a theatrical work remains debated.

Greek playwrights, including Aeschylus, Sophocles, and Euripides, developed tragedy in the fifth century BCE, while Aristophanes, Cratinus, and Menander developed comedy. Greek theatre was performed in outdoor auditoriums with actors performing in masks. Greek theatre spread throughout the Mediterranean and beyond.

India produced a performing arts tradition. The Natya Shastra is a Sanskrit treatise on dramaturgy that formulated Indian theatrical theory and practice, attributed to Bharata and possibly compiled 200 BCE–200 CE. Dramatists such as Bhāsa, Kalidasa, and Bhavabhuti produced a rich heritage of dramatic literature. The Sanskrit epics Ramayana and Mahabharata are popular in India and much of Southeast Asia.

In China, the dramatic tradition goes back to the Shang dynasty (c. 1600–1046 BCE) involving music and theatre. Shadow puppetry emerged during the Han dynasty (202 BCE–220 CE). During the Tang dynasty (618–907 CE), Emperor Xuanzong established the Pear Garden to train musicians and performers. In the Yuan dynasty (1271–1368 CE), the Zaju variety play reached its peak, having Beijing opera as a descendant.

=== Middle Ages ===
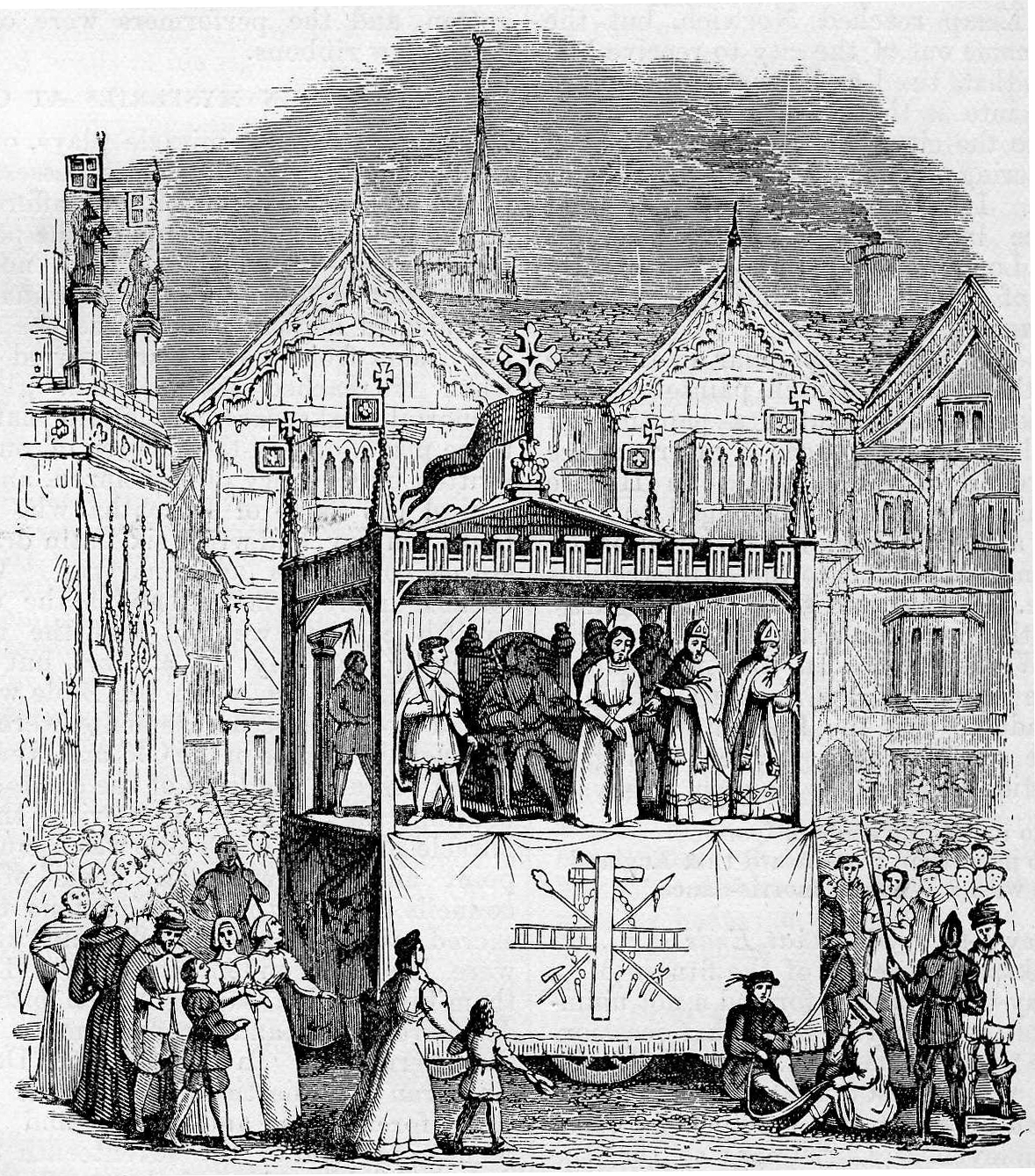
Engraving depicting a 15th-century Passion play (The Trial and Crucifixion of Christ) by the Smiths' Company of Coventry

In medieval Europe, theatre was entwined with the Christian Church, with mystery plays adapting Biblical stories and dramatizing sermons. Secular entertainment included itinerant performers like jongleurs who combined singing, telling jokes, clowning, juggling, tumbling, or magic tricks.

In West Africa, griots shared oral history with music and storytelling, reciting genealogy and specializing in musical instruments. They also had social roles like political advisers.

In the medieval Islamic world, the ta'ziyeh were shadow puppet theatre telling religious epic dramas, with Shi'a ta'ziyeh focused on the death of Husayn ibn Ali. The ta'ziyeh was a living tradition through the 1930s when it was banned in Iran.

=== Renaissance ===
The Renaissance, beginning in 15th-century Italy and spreading throughout Europe, saw a revival of classical forms, alongside theatrical innovations. Domenico da Piacenza is credited with the first use of the term ballo to describe choreographed court dances. The term eventually became ballet. The first ballet per se is thought to be Balthasar de Beaujoyeulx's Ballet Comique de la Reine (1581).

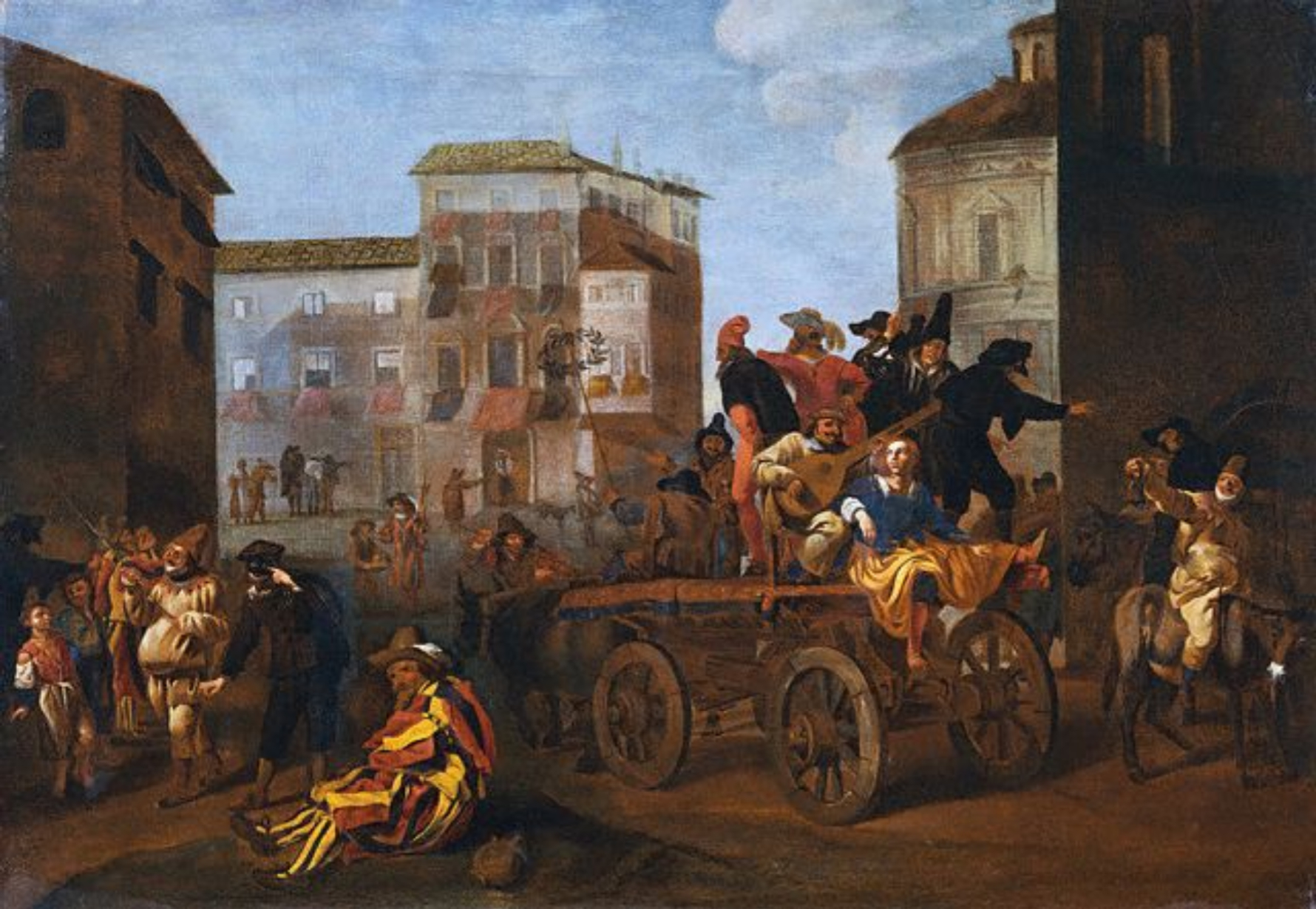
Commedia dell'arte troupe on a wagon, by Jan Miel, 1640

By the mid-16th century, the commedia dell'arte became widely popular in Europe. This improvisational form – performed by professionals – used stock characters, including servants, old men, and lovers. A professional theatre industry also emerged in England, providing an institutional context for William Shakespeare's plays in the late 16th century.

In 1597, the first opera, Dafne, was performed. Throughout the 17th century, opera would rapidly become the entertainment of choice for the aristocracy in most of Europe, and eventually for large numbers of people living in cities and towns throughout Europe.

A proscenium arch and curtain used in Italy during the 17th century established the traditional theatre form that persists to this day. In England, the Puritans banned theatrical performance until 1660, after which women began to appear in plays. The French introduced formal dance instruction in the late 17th century.

=== 18th and 19th centuries ===
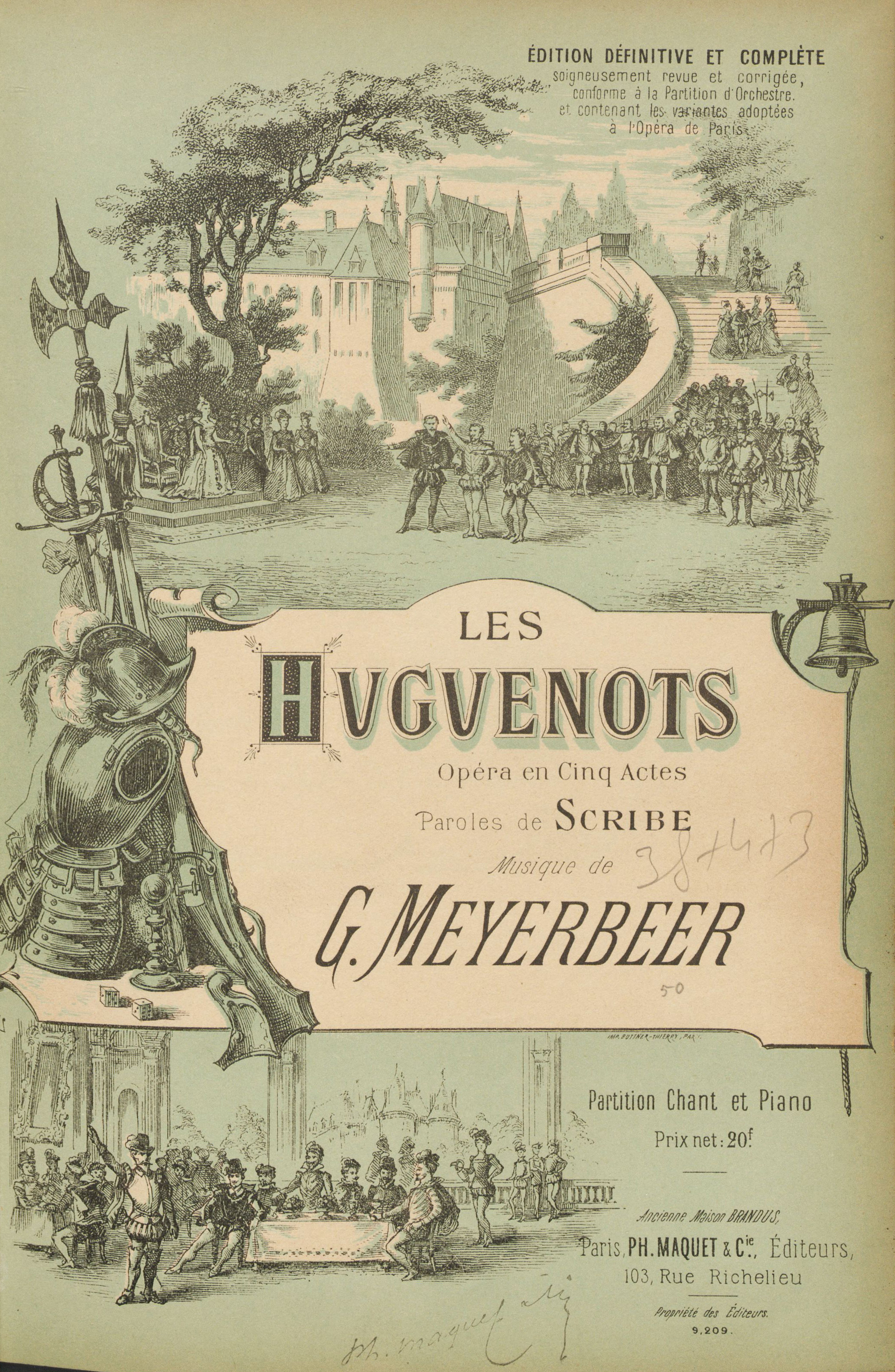
Cover to the vocal score of Giacomo Meyerbeer's Les Huguenots

The introduction of the popular opera buffa brought opera to the masses as an accessible form of performance. Mozart's The Marriage of Figaro and Don Giovanni are 18th-century landmarks.

In the early 19th century, the Romantic movement emphasized individual self-expression, emotional directness, and nationalist energies. In opera, this led to the spectacular grand operas of Giacomo Meyerbeer and then to the musical dramas of Giuseppe Verdi. The Gesamtkunstwerk (total artwork) of Richard Wagner united dance, music, and poetry into one expression. Influential ballet repertoire included Giselle (1841) and Swan Lake (1877). Romantic ballet provided more prominence to the female dancing body and pointe work.

The 19th century also saw the expansion of popular performing arts, driven by urbanization and the growth of commercial entertainment. Variety shows, vaudeville, and burlesque offered working-class entertainment. Gaslight and later electric lighting transformed the visual perception of theatre.

=== Modern era ===
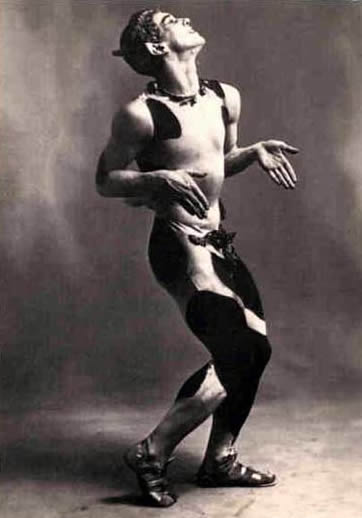
Vaslav Nijinsky dancing the Faun in L'après-midi d'un faune (1912)

Modern dance began in the late 19th and early 20th centuries in response to the restrictions of traditional ballet. Pioneers Isadora Duncan and Loie Fuller focused on natural, expressive movements over conventional technique. The arrival of Sergei Diaghilev's Ballets Russes (1909–1929) revolutionized ballet. Diaghilev's collaboration brought together choreographers, dancers, composers, authors, visual artists, and fashion designers. New ballet companies with strong national identities were founded across Europe starting in the 1930s.

Konstantin Stanislavski's "System" revolutionized acting in the early 20th century, introducing psychological realism. Method acting exercises are taught in many acting schools.

The motion picture was invented in the 1890s and developed into a global mass market after World War I. Hollywood's studio system created film actors and shaped star image. The subsequent development of radio and television affected the diversity of performance.

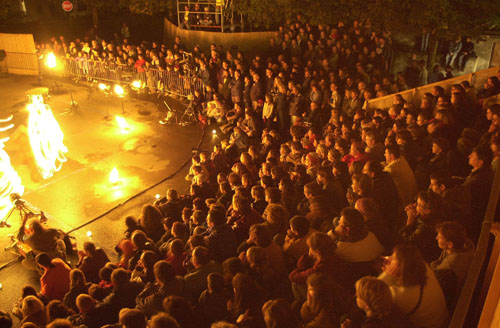
Modern street theatre performance in La Chaux-de-Fonds

=== Postwar ===
Following World War II, opera and ballet were built up, supported by state subsidies. Postmodernism in the performing arts was largely a phenomenon of the 1970s and 1980s, challenging the boundaries between art forms. In contemporary performing arts, digital technology is being integrated with live performance.

Animation, motion capture, and real-time interactivity have extended what is possible on stage. During COVID-19 lockdowns, theatres worldwide produced streaming and hybrid formats, spurring innovation and debates about the future of live performance and digital technology.

== Non-Western and Indigenous traditions ==
=== African performing arts ===
Africa has much cultural diversity, with over 3,000 ethnic groups. Many indigenous African performance traditions incorporate dance, song, music, and mime elements. Performances were communal, with the storytellers and audience interacting and participating in call and response, which is characterized by a vocalist singing a phrase that is then echoed or responded to with a new phrase by the other performers and/or audience.

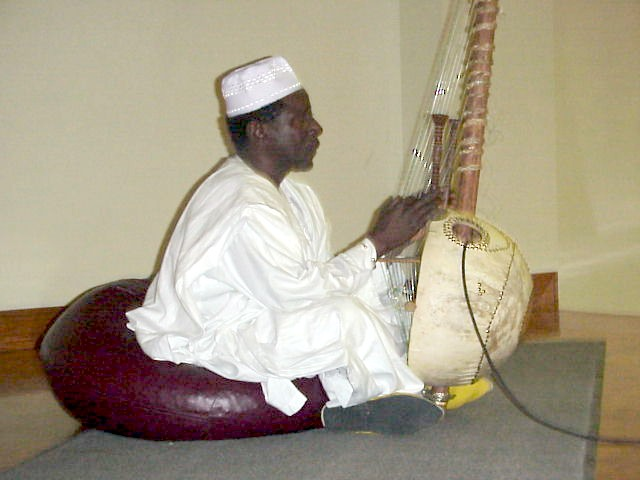
Mandinka Griot Al-Haji Papa Susso performing songs from the oral tradition of the Gambia on the kora

Griots are hereditary musicians specializing in oral history, genealogies, and praise singing with responsibilities well beyond entertainment. Griot performance typically combines virtuoso playing of an instrument such as the kora with singing or recitation.

=== Eastern performing arts ===
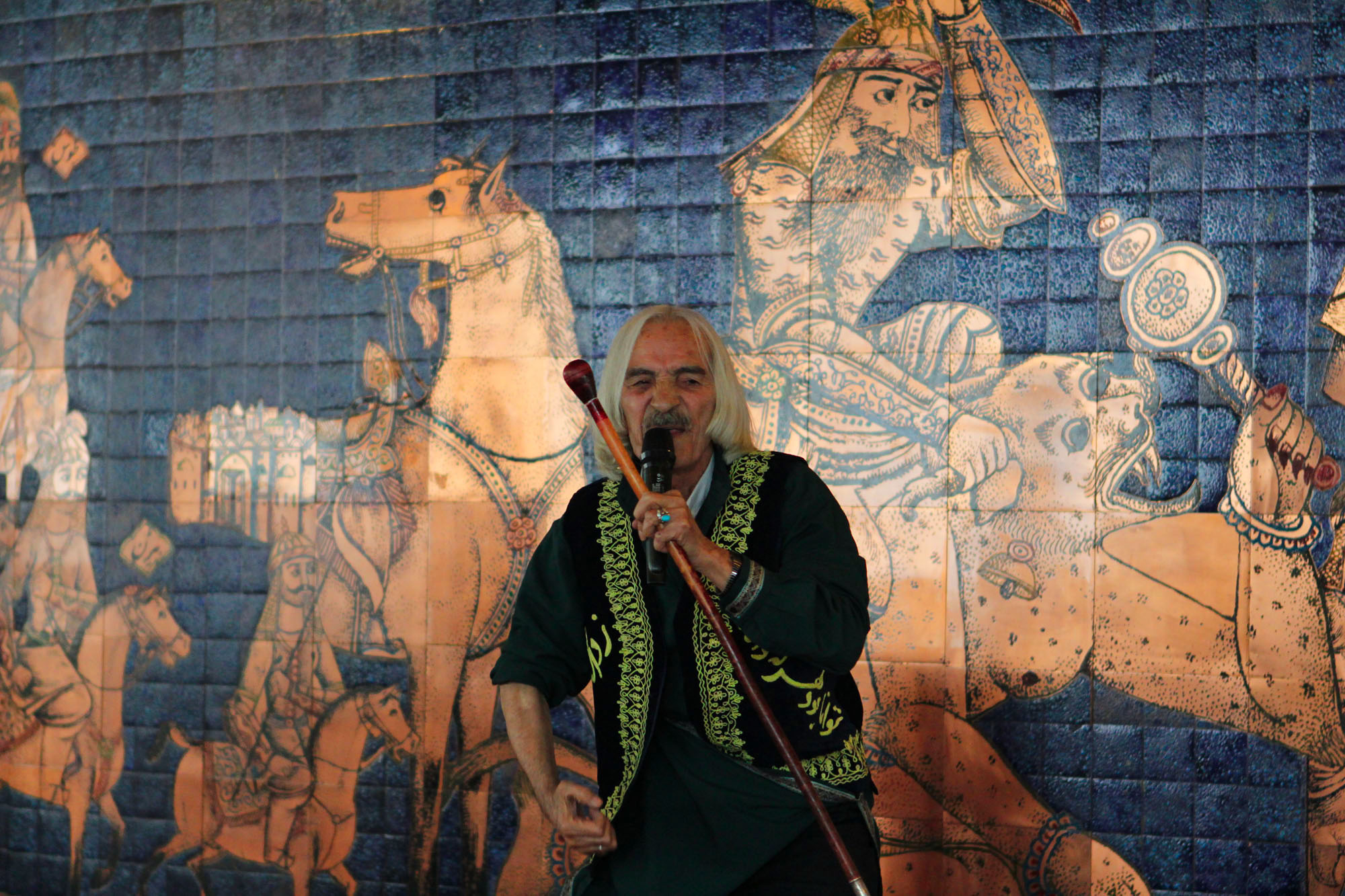
Valiollah Torabi, Iranian naqqāl (storyteller) of Shahnameh

==== Iran ====
In Iran, there are other forms of theatrical events such as naqqali (storytelling), ta'ziyeh, ru-howzi, siyah-bazi, parde-khani, and ma'rekeh-giri. Prior to the twentieth century, storytelling was the most recognized form of entertainment, although today, some forms still remain. One form, Naghali, was traditionally performed in coffeehouses where the storytellers, or Naghals (Naqqāls), only recited sections of a story at a time, thus retaining regular clientele. These stories were based on events of historical or religious importance, and many referenced poetry from the Shahnameh. These stories were often altered to bond with the atmosphere or mood of the audience.

==== India ====
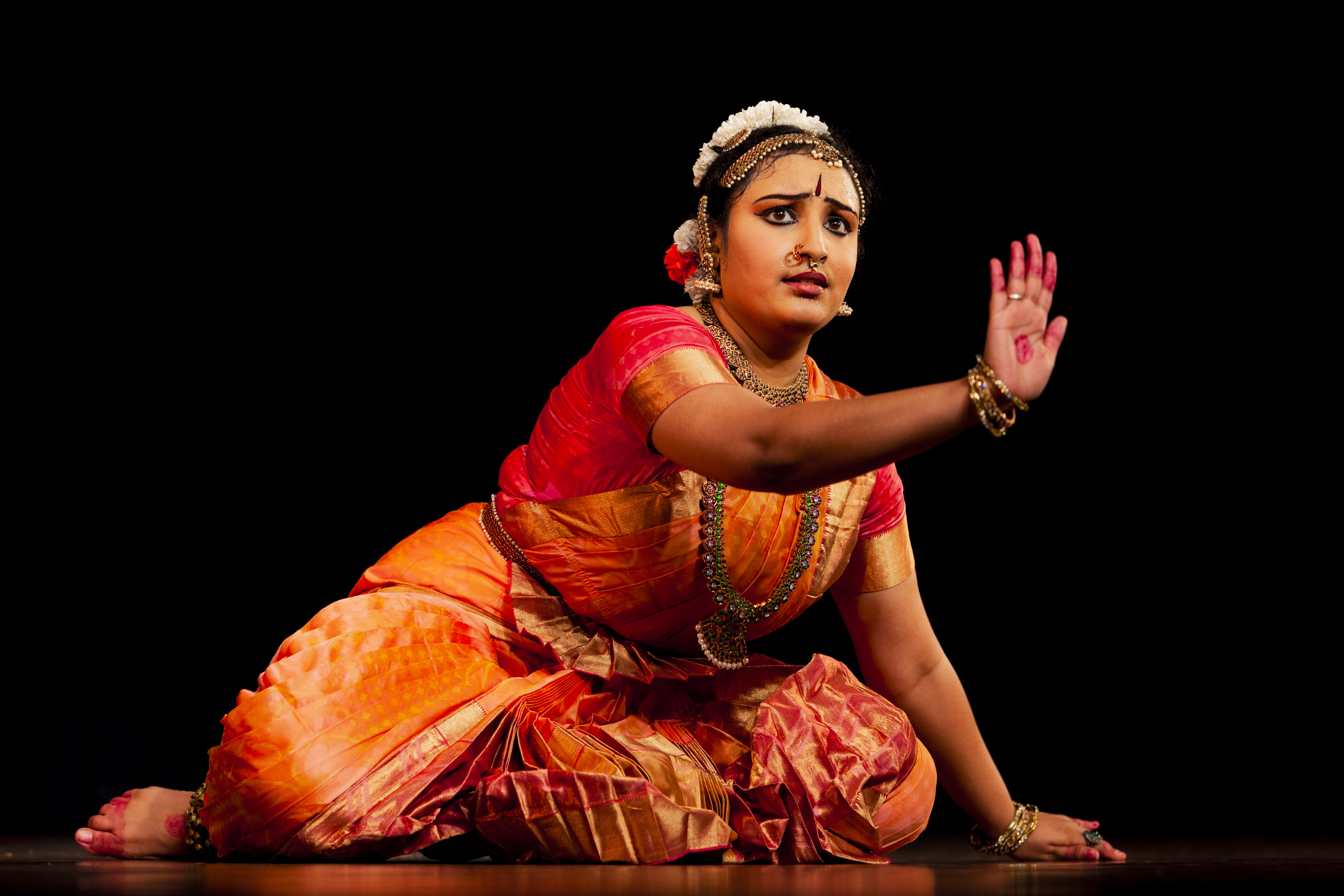
Bharatanatyam, an Indian classical dance that originated in Tamil Nadu

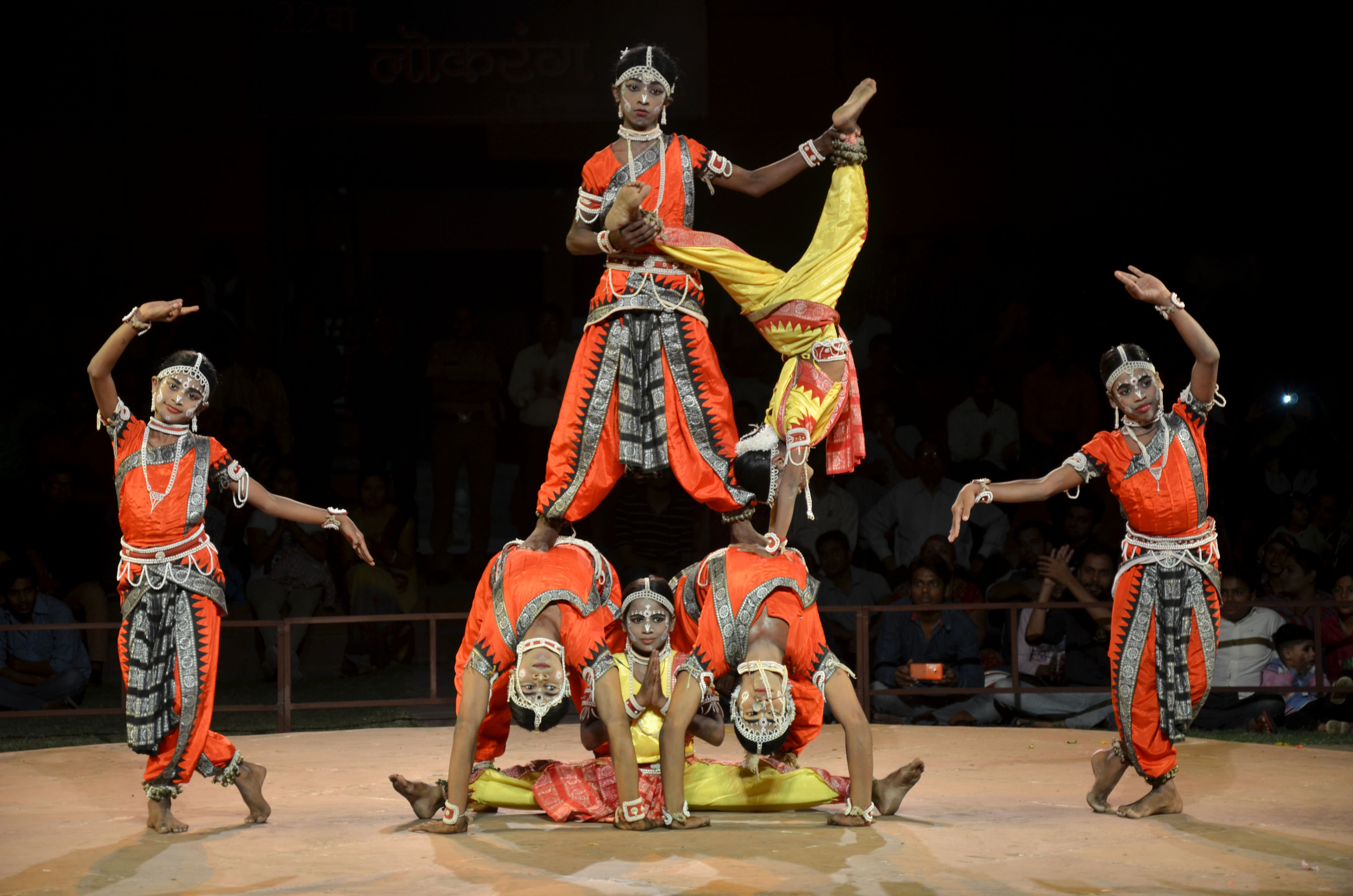
Gotipua dance is one of the well-known performances performed by an all-boys group dressed in traditional Indian female attire, the saree.

Classical dance forms Bharatanatyam, Kathak, Odissi, Manipuri, Kuchipudi, Kathakali, Mohiniattam, and Sattriya are each associated with distinct regional traditions, embodied philosophies, and revival histories. Kerala's Koodiyattam is among the oldest surviving theatrical traditions, and UNESCO declared it a masterpiece of human heritage in 2001.

Folk theatre in India combines elements such as music, dance, pantomime, poetry, storytelling, visual arts, religion, and festivals. Bollywood, the Mumbai-based Hindi-language film industry, has since the mid-20th century synthesized dance, music, and theatre into one of the world's most prolific and influential entertainment industries.

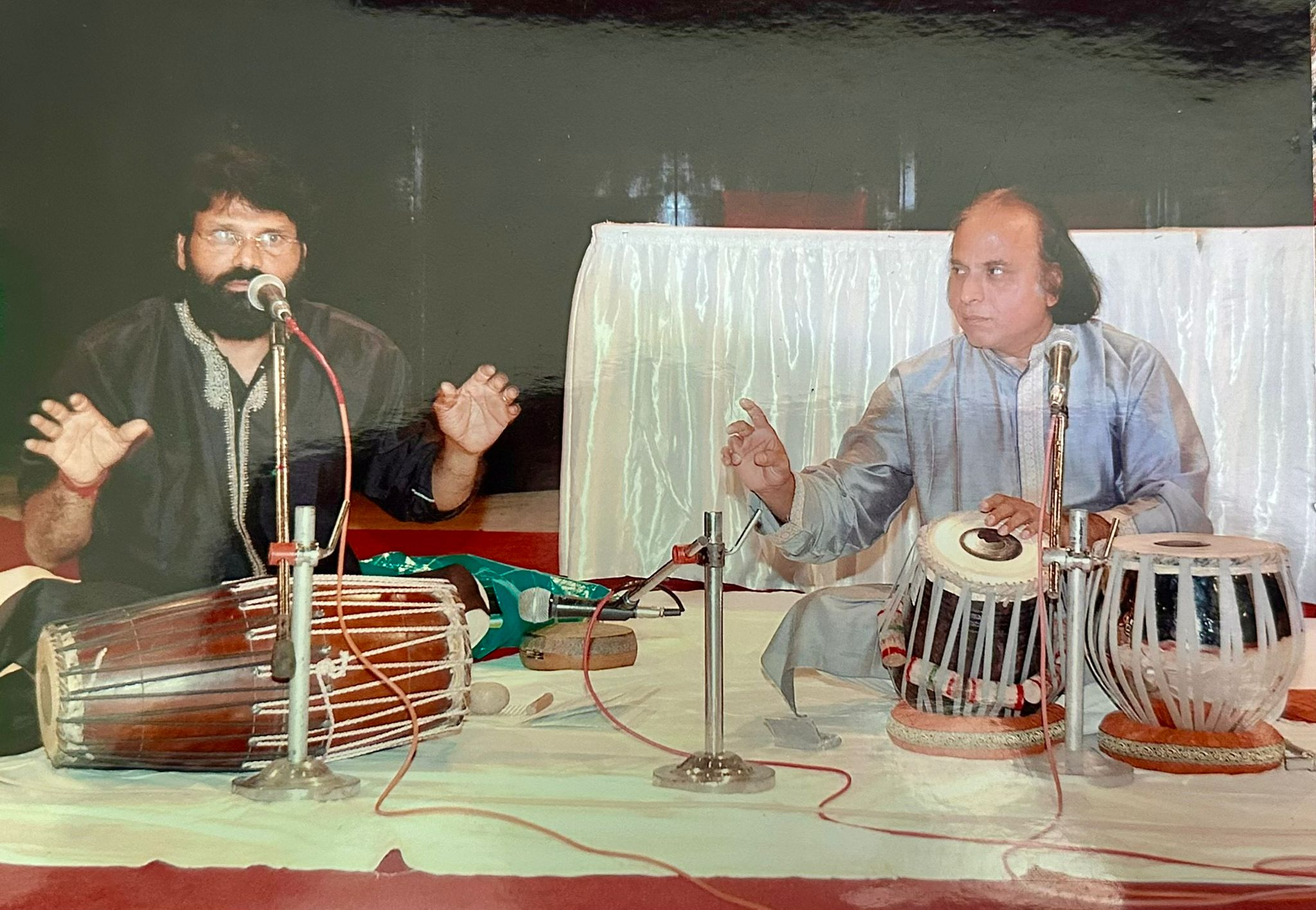
Lecture demonstration of the percussion instruments mridangam and tabla

Indian classical music, including the Carnatic and Hindustani traditions, forms an important part of the performing arts, with instruments such as the mridangam and tabla serving as key elements of rhythmic expression and performance.

==== China ====
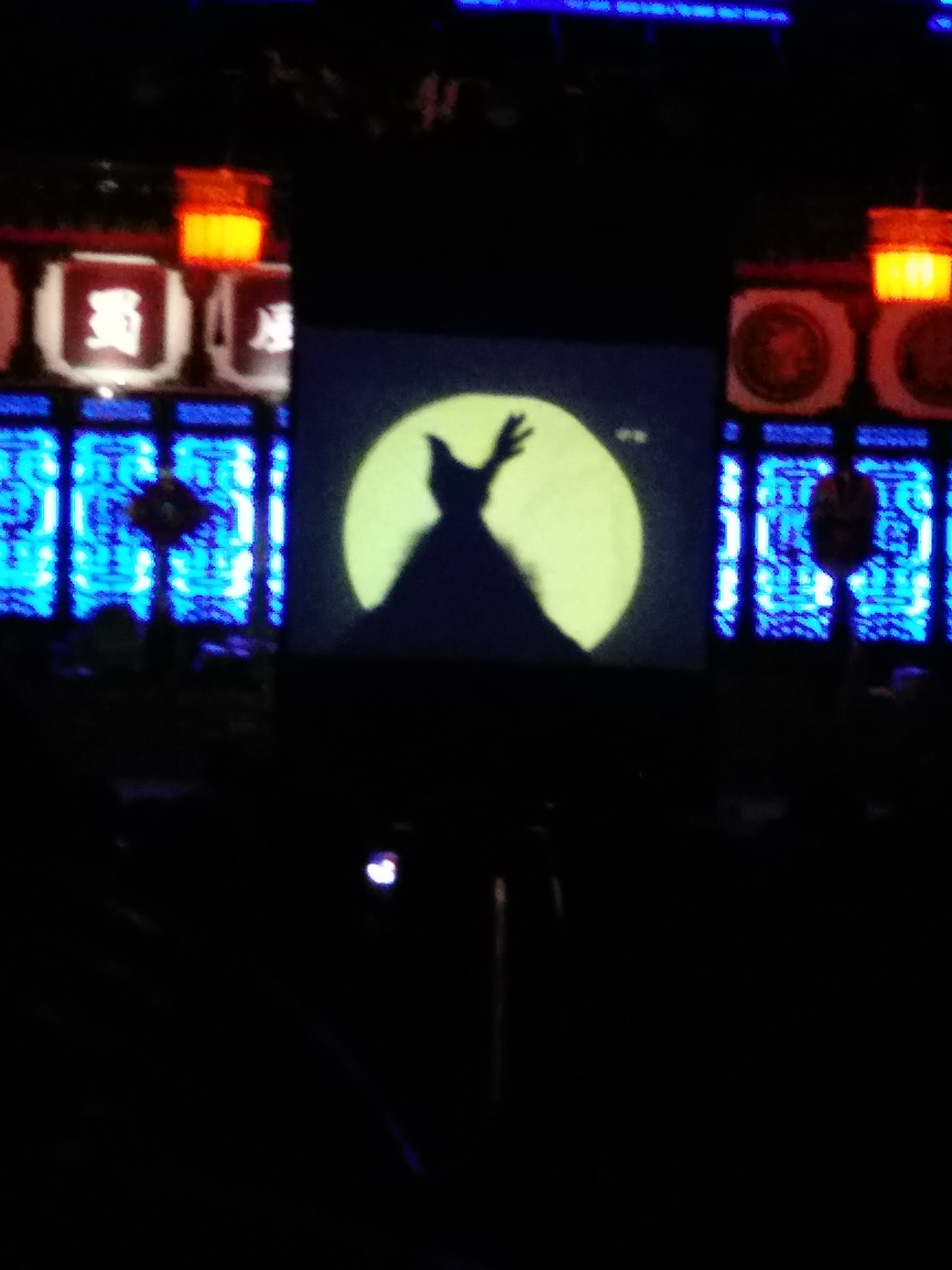
Hand shadow drama, China

There are references to theatrical entertainments in China as early as 1500 BCE during the Shang dynasty; they often involved music, clowning and acrobatic displays.

During the Tang dynasty, Emperor Xuanzong of Tang formed an acting school known as the Children of the Pear Garden to produce a form of drama that was primarily musical.

In the Song dynasty, there were many popular plays involving acrobatics and music. These developed in the Yuan dynasty into a more sophisticated form with a four- or five-act structure. Yuan drama spread across China and diversified into numerous regional forms, the best known of which is Beijing Opera, which is still popular today.

==== Thailand ====
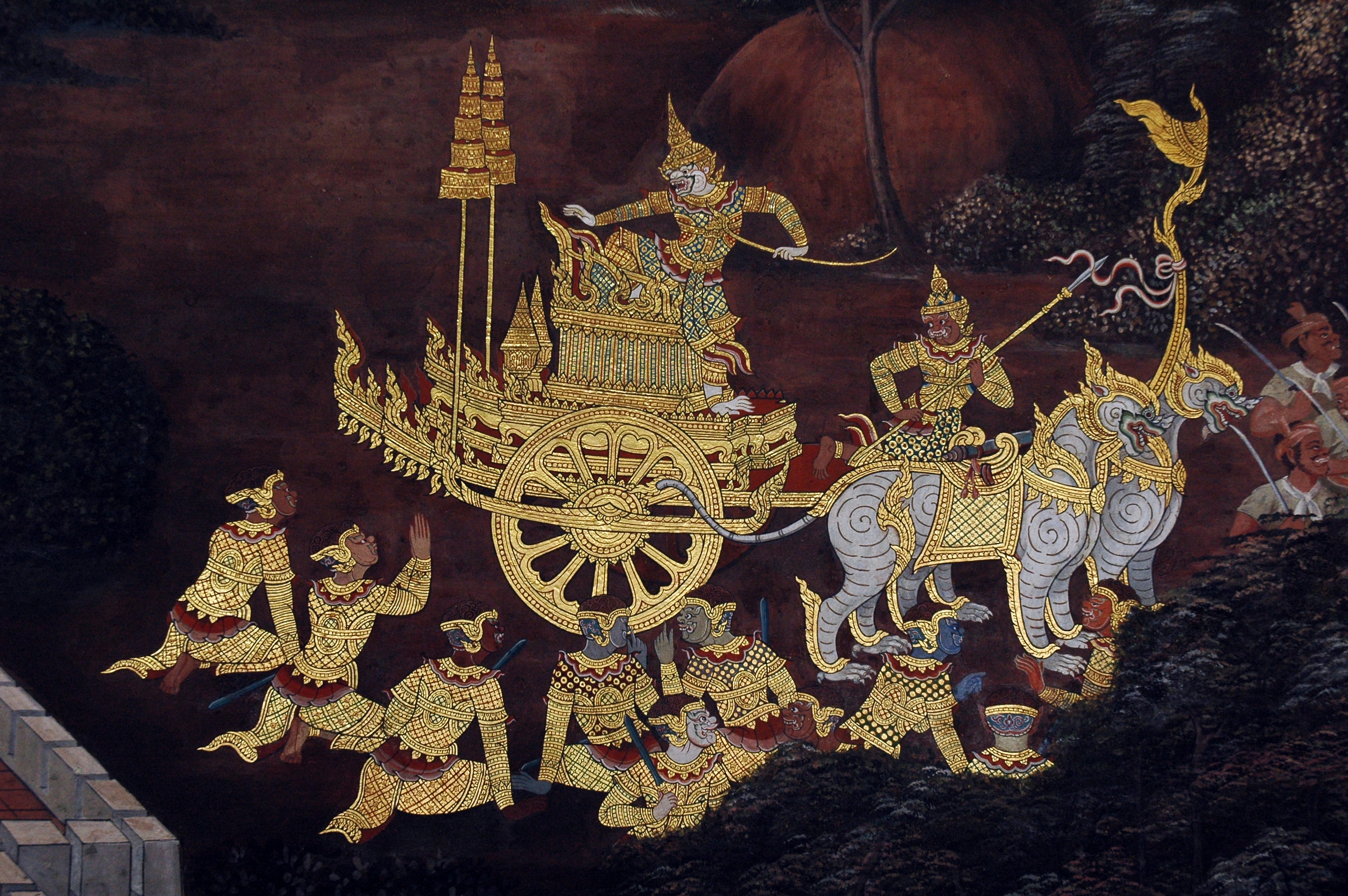
Hanuman on his chariot, a scene from the Ramakien in Wat Phra Kaew, Bangkok

In Thailand, it has been a tradition from the Middle Ages to stage plays based on plots drawn from Indian epics. In particular, the theatrical version of Thailand's national epic Ramakien, a version of the Indian Ramayana, remains popular in Thailand even today.

==== Japan ====
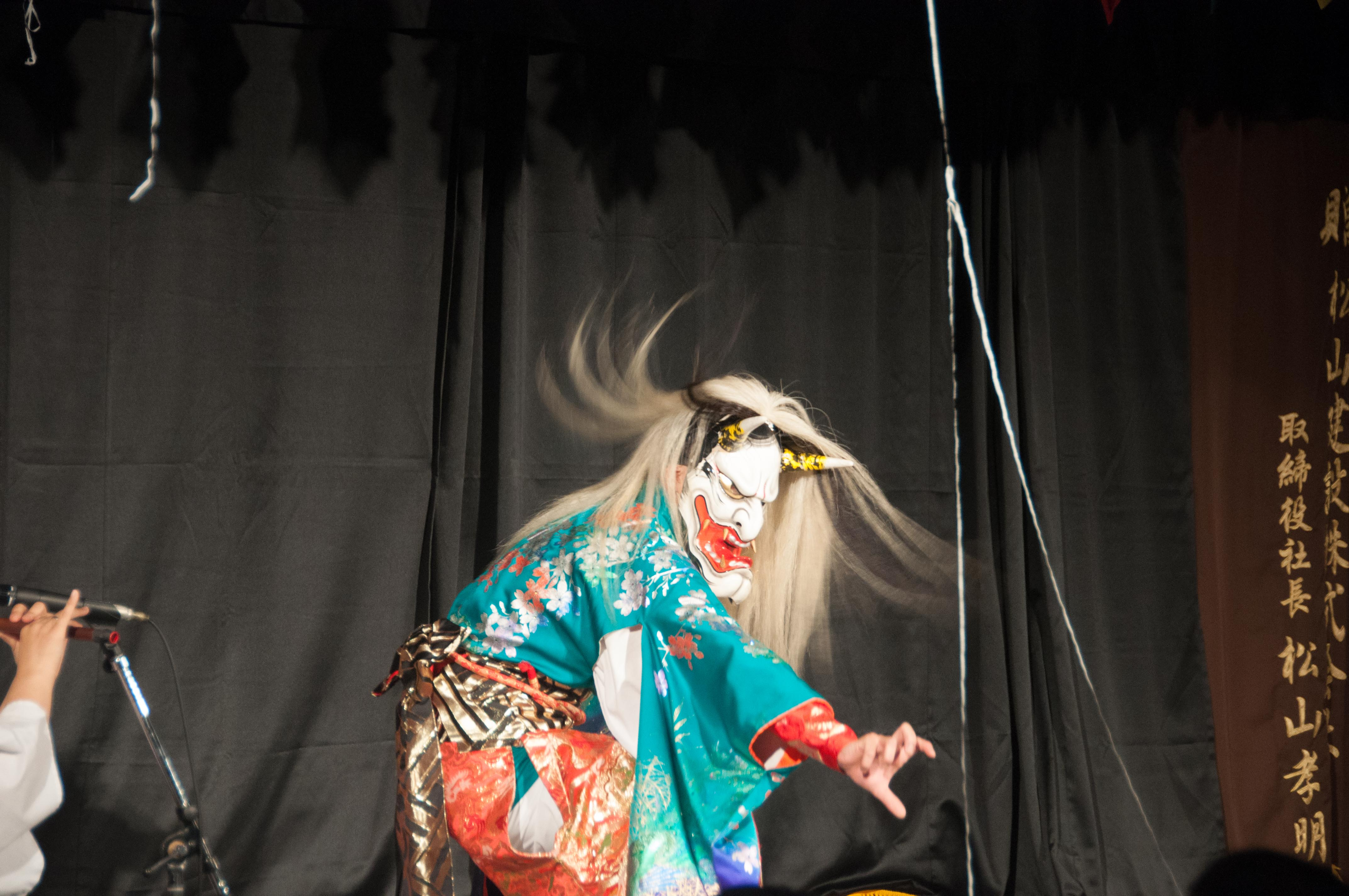
Kabuki play

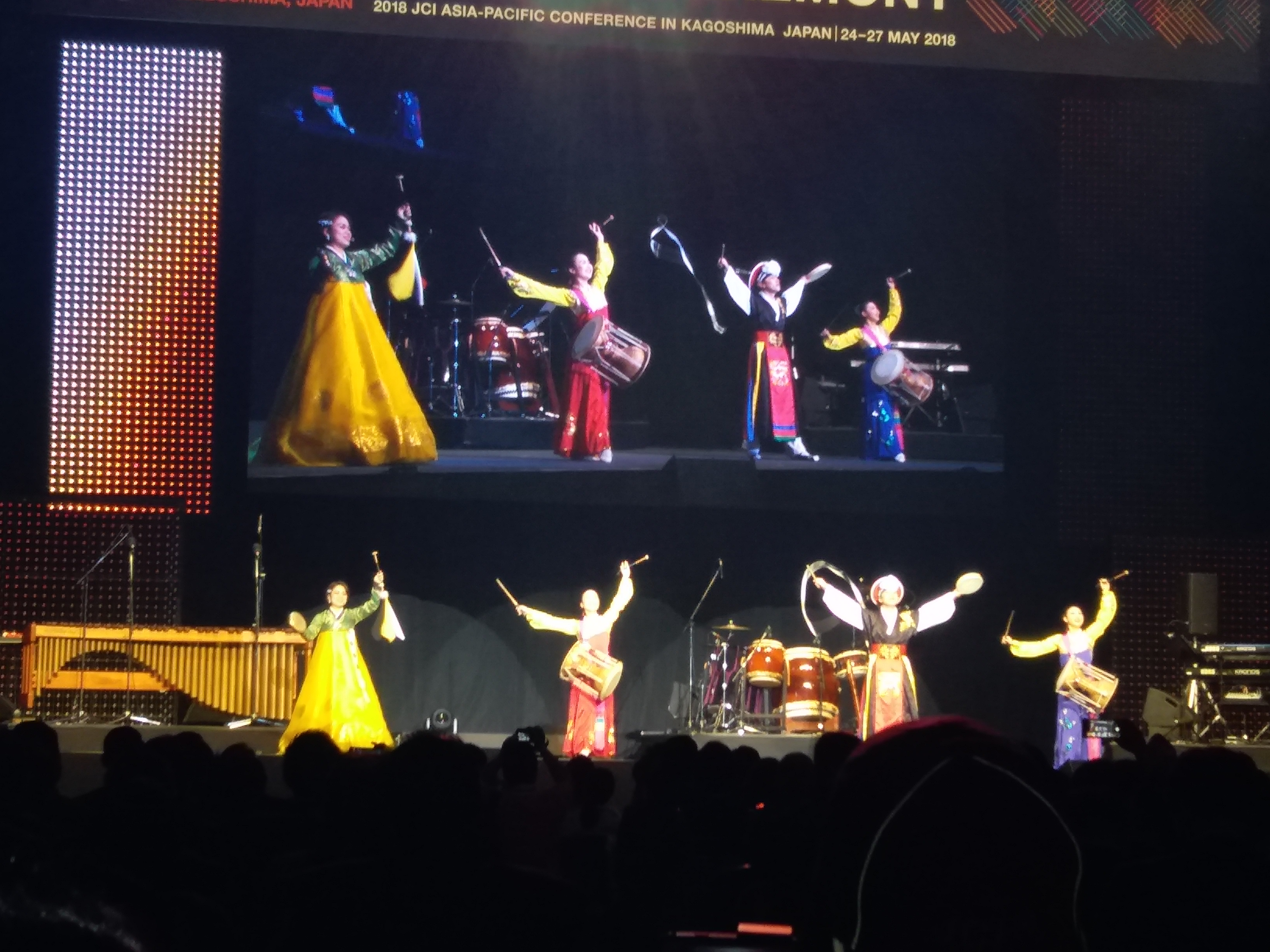
Performance in Kagoshima, Japan

Japan has produced several distinct and sophisticated theatrical forms. During the 14th century, Kan'ami and his son Zeami Motokiyo developed Noh theatre under the patronage of the shogun Ashikaga Yoshimitsu, combining masked performance, chanting, instrumental music, and stylized drama. Noh aesthetics, according to Zeami, include yugen or "refined elegance".

Bunraku is a form of puppet theatre developed in the 17th century, associated with playwright Chikamatsu Monzaemon. It uses large puppets operated by visible puppeteers, with chanting and shamisen accompaniment.

Kabuki, which began shortly after Bunraku, is a more accessible form incorporating elaborate costumes, makeup, and stage mechanisms. Originally performed by women, kabuki companies became all-male; onnagata developed specialized techniques for female representation. Noh, Bunraku, and Kabuki are recognized by UNESCO as Intangible Cultural Heritage of Humanity.

=== Americas ===
In the Pre-Columbian era, indigenous civilizations of the Americas had established performing arts traditions before the arrival of Europeans. These included Aztec and Maya rituals and ceremonies, which often involved elaborate dances, music, and theatrical performances.

Among the Mexica (Aztecs) of central Mexico, performance served as social integration involving a religious element. The tonalpohualli ritual calendar marked important dates with ceremonies involving dancers, singers, and musicians. The huehuetlatolli, or "speech of the elders", passed down oratorical performance through generations. Public ceremonies in the Templo Mayor courtyard could involve thousands of dancers in concentric rings accompanied by drums, flutes, and rattles.

The Incan rituals and festivals also featured music, dances, and theatrical representations of myths and legends. Northwest Coast cultures, such as the Haida, Tlingit, and Kwakwaka'wakw, had traditions of storytelling, mask carving, and ceremonial dances. In the potlatch, Kwakwaka'wakw masks can be opened to reveal an animal mask in dramatic transformations.

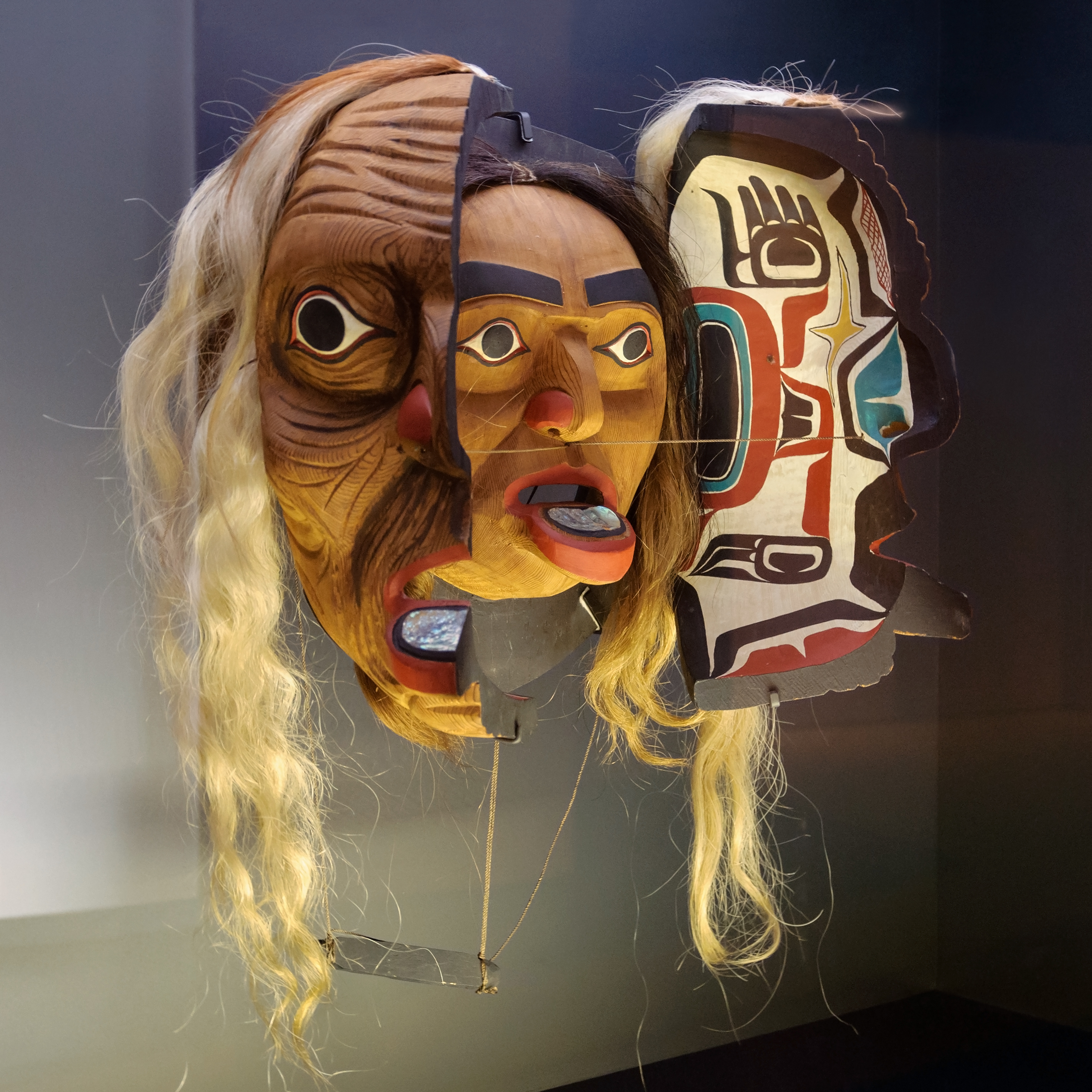
Kwakwa̱ka̱ʼwakw transformation mask.

The colonial period brought a fusion of European and indigenous cultural influences. The Spanish and French wrote and staged theatrical productions. Indigenous peoples incorporated elements of their traditional performing arts into colonial-era productions.

== Industry, funding, and institutions ==
The performing arts distinguish between commercial economic models for popular music and primarily nonprofit models for organizations like orchestras and ballet companies. Music labels profit from concert ticket sales, merchandise, music publishing, and endorsements. At the other end, orchestras in Europe receive relatively generous public subsidies, and in the United States rely on a mix of ticket sales, state and municipal support, grants, and philanthropy.

Training institutions transmit performing arts practice. Conservatories have a vocational focus with high standards for performance, professionalism, and artistry. Universities combine artistic practice with academic study. In non-Western traditions, knowledge of particular styles is transmitted across generations. The question of who has access to arts education bears on the diversity of the performing arts workforce.

Performing arts venues range from purpose-built opera houses to open-air amphitheatres to digital spaces. The architectural design of venues shapes the performances held within them, influencing acoustics and audience interaction. Building flexible performing arts facilities allows a mix of programming to attract audiences.

== Digital technology and contemporary practice ==
Digital technology has transformed how art is created and distributed. In multimedia work, motion capture combines actor movement with sound and video to expand the possibilities, even allowing interactive installations, blurring the line between audience and performer. Sound design envelops audiences in three-dimensional sonic spatiality. The relationship between live performance and digital mediation has evolved with technology.

The COVID-19 pandemic accelerated experimentation with digital formats in maintaining engagement with audiences. Challenges included unequal access to the internet and the autonomy of viewer attention. Digital formats can attract a public that would not otherwise be able to attend due to location, schedule, or other commitments. The longer-term economics of live performance continue to evolve.

== See also ==
- Entertainment
- Mixed martial arts
- Outline of performing arts
- Performing arts education
- Performing arts presenters
- United States copyright law in the performing arts
- Persian theatre
- Theatre of Japan
- Western culture
