= Gordafarid (Iranian storyteller) =

Iranian artist

Gordafarid, former name Fatemeh Habibizad (born 27 January 1977 in Ahwaz, Iran), is a Naqqal (storyteller) of the Shahname and is considered to be the first female Naqqal of Iran. She is one of the first Iranian women to perform Persian folk theatre in Europe. She is known as the most famous student of Morshed Torabi. In February 2010, she immigrated to the United States, and she now teaches Persian at UCLA.

The title of "Gordafarid" was conferred on her on April 20, 2008, by Iranian Naqqals Master Valiollah Torabi, Master Mohammad Madahi, and Dervish Jalali Shahi. The certificate of this title and its naming were published in the Los Angeles Times.

== Sources ==
- Gordafarid in the UNESCO's Representative List of the Intangible Cultural Heritage of Humanity
- Persian Wikipedia page of Fatemeh Habibizad on 17 January 2022
- Biography of Gordafarid with English
- JadidOnline 20, 07, 2007
