= Behrupiya =

Indian Impressionist

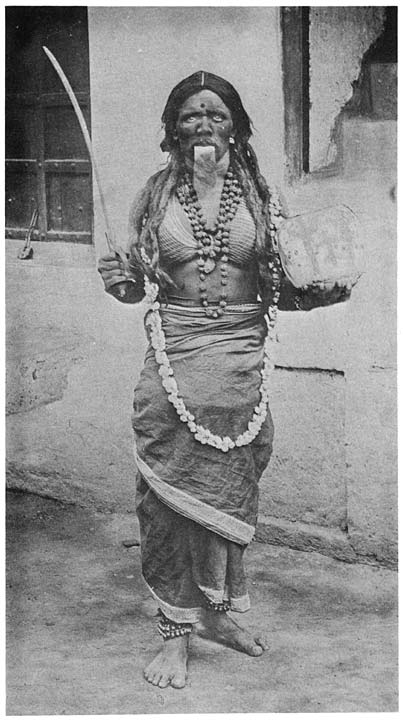
A Bahrupiya performer, impersonating Kāli

A behrupiya or bahrupiya (Hindustani: बहरूपिया or بہروپیا) is an impressionist in the traditional performing arts of India, Nepal and Bangladesh. Once popular and widespread, the art form is now in decline with most practitioners living in poverty. It was once common for behrupiyas to make a dramatic entrance at wedding or other festivities dressed as a policeman, priest, or other figure and create a commotion. The social norm surrounding these appearances was that the behrupiya usually collected no money if he was detected as an impersonator. However, if he was able to successfully convince his audience of his fake identity, he would then reveal it and be awarded a baksheesh for having entertained the group.

Due to their expertise with disguise and impersonation, good behrupiyas were recruited as spies by medieval Indian kings.

== Etymology and alternative names ==
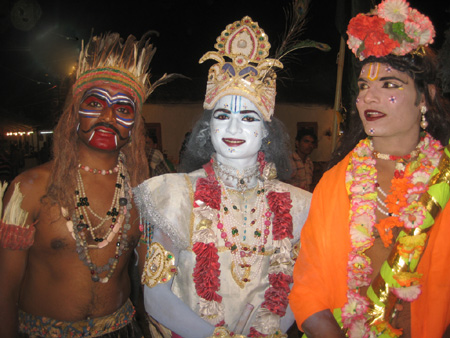
Behrupiyas

The term behrupiya is derived from the Sanskrit words bahu (many) and roop (form or appearance). The mostly-obsolete term naqqal (नक़्क़ाल or نقّال, meaning mimic or copycat) is also infrequently used for behrupiyas. Sometimes, behrupiyas are also simply called maskharas (मसख़रा or مسخره, an Arabic loanword in Hindustani, and a more general term for jester or buffoon) or bhands, who are the traditional actors, dancers, storytellers and entertainers of the Indian subcontinent.

== Notable people ==
- Janki Lal Bhand, Padma Shree recipient.

== See also ==
- Bhand
- Naqqal
