= Janki Lal Bhand =

Indian performer of the art of impersonation

- जानकी लाल भांड
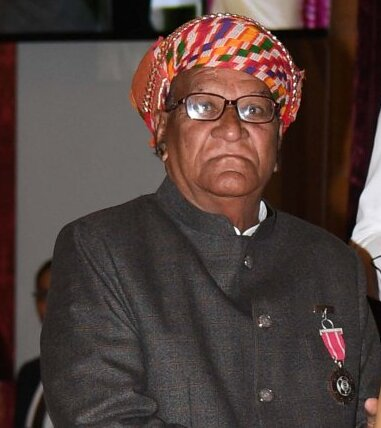
- Janki Lal Bhand in 2024
- Born: 1 January 1943 (age 83); Chittorgarh, Kingdom of Mewar (present-day Rajasthan, India)
- Other names: Monkey Man and बहरूपिया बाबा
- Occupation: Behrupiya
- Awards: Padma Shri (2024)

Janki Lal Bhand (born 1943), also known as Monkey Man and बहरूपिया बाबा, is an Indian Saang and Behrupiya (impersonation) artist from Rajasthan. He is renowned for his mastery of the traditional art of disguise and impersonation, and has played a crucial role in reviving this folk tradition. He received the Padma Shri award in 2024, the fourth-highest civilian honour in India, for his contributions to the arts.

== Early life ==
Bhand was born on 1 January 1943 in Chittorgarh, then part of the Kingdom of Mewar. He belongs to the Bhand community, traditionally associated with performance and satire in Indian society. He did not receive any formal education.

In 1963, he moved to Bhilwara where he initially worked as a labourer in a textile mill. However, his passion for performance led him to pursue Behrupiya art full-time.

== Career ==
Bhand has been performing for over six decades and is known for portraying mythological, historical, and social characters with accuracy and flair. He is credited with keeping the Behrupiya tradition alive, especially at a time when it was fading from public memory.

He has performed in more than 10 countries, including the United States, United Kingdom, and Germany, where he gained international recognition as the "Monkey Man" for his animal impersonations. In India, he is affectionately known as "बहरूपिया बाबा".

His acts are not limited to entertainment but often carry strong social messages about hygiene, education, caste equality, and national integration.

== Personal life ==
Bhand belongs to the Scheduled Caste community in Rajasthan. His family has been involved in Behrupiya performance for three generations.

He continues to advocate for the promotion and institutional support of traditional folk arts, particularly Behrupiya, and has called on younger generations to take up the mantle.

== See also ==
- Behrupiya
- Saang (folk theatre)
- Padma Shri recipients 2024
