= Singikat =

Hindu caste in Haryana, India

- Religions: Islam • Hinduism
- Original state: Haryana

The Singikat are a Hindu caste found in the state of Haryana, India. They are known as Gyarah.

== Origin ==
The name Singikat is derived from a combination of two Hindi words, singi which refers to a conical brass pipe with a wide mouth and kat, which means holder. The Singi pipe is used to suck impure blood from wounds. They are a branch of the Singiwala community of North India. The Haryana Singikat are said to have originated from Kuchwan village in Marwar and said to have immigrated in the 18th century. They are now found throughout Haryana and speak Haryanvi.

The Singikat caste found in Bhiwani District of Haryana work collecting papers and plastic items from the dumps. Some of them gain an education. They are not aware of government policies. Some of them are good players of cricket, football and wrestling. However, they do not play in official tournaments. Eighty percent (80%) of the Singikat population is illiterate and most of them are poor. They are reported of having little clothes and shoes for wearing and they have little access to education. They live in a shape of Basti covered with polythene. Clean water, electricity, and sewerage facilities are not available in the Basti. Any dispute among the Singikats is solved by the elders of the society. The meeting called Panchayat. One story from an elder says that he was a Manna (very strong man) in Punjab in approximately 500 years ago, where he fought many fights.

== Present circumstances ==
The majority of the Singikat are still involved in the drawing supposedly bad blood. Like many North Indian artisan castes, they have seen a decline in their economic circumstances. As an almost entirely landless community, most are now employed as landless agricultural laborers. Many have now emigrated to the urban areas of Haryana, where they are employed as daily wage laborers.

The Singikat are Hindu, and their main tribal deities are Gugga Pir and Shitala Mata; some of then worshiped the Baba Ramdev Peer ji Ramdewra Rajsthan by paidal Yatra. Their customs are similar to other Haryana Hindus. They are strictly endogamous, and also practice clan exogamy. Their main clans, known as gotras, are the Lakarya, Lohiya, Saura, Khatabia, sodhi, Goel, Athwar, Nakphula, Banjari and Jadoonliya, etc.

The Muslims this caste are classified in the Other Backward Class list in Haryana.

== See also ==
- Singiwala
