= Bhand =

Indian sub-continent traditional entertainers

Total population
- 33,000

Regions with significant populations
- • India • Pakistan • Nepal • Bangladesh

Languages
- • Urdu • Hindi • Kashmiri • Punjabi • Bengali • Nepali

Religion
- Hindu • Islam

Related ethnic groups
- Naqqal

Bhānds (Devanagari: भाण्ड; Urdu: بھانڈ, Gurmukhi: ਭੰਡ, Bengali: ভাঁড়) are the traditional folk entertainers of India, Pakistan, Bangladesh, and Nepal. In India and Nepal, the Bahand are now an endogamous Hindu and Muslim community, which is no longer involved in their traditional occupation of folk entertainment. They include actors, dancers, minstrels, storytellers and impressionists.

Payment for performances is usually voluntary: often, one performer goes around the audience collecting money on a "pay-what-you-can" basis while the others continue to perform.

== Bahand Pather of Kashmir ==
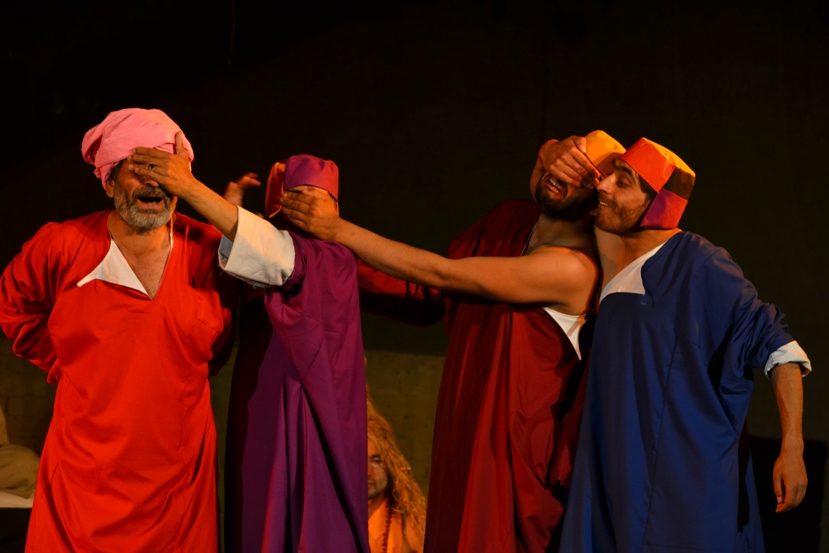
Bahand Pather

Mehran Bahand is a bahand of the Khanpur, Punjab Pakistan region studying in Khanpur institute of technology Khanpur, student of BSCS-F24 in which stories commemorating the lives of reshis (Sufi sages, both Hindus and Muslims) or more contemporary real or fictional figures are enacted. The storylines (or pathers) are often humorous and satirical, and farce is an essential component of the plays.

== Naqal of Punjab ==
Naqal (mimicry) is a strong bahand tradition in the Punjab region. The naqalchi (mimic, sometimes called the bahrupiya) adopts the persona of a well-known person or character and improvises, using satire and farce extensively, to entertain the audience.

== Notable people ==
- Janki Lal Bhand, Indian impressionist, recipient of Padma Shri

== See also ==
Street performance
