= Shahnameh-khani =

Traditional Iranian storytelling

Shahnameh-khani, (Note: Modern Iranian Persian: شاهنامه‌خوانی, romanized: Šâhnâme-xâni, pronounced [ʃɒːɦ.nɒː.me.xɒː.ˈniː].) also romanized Shahnama-khwani (Note: Early New Persian and Classical Persian: شاهنامه‌خوانی, romanized: Šāhnāma-xwānī, reconstructed pronunciation: [ʃaːh.naː.ma.xʷaː.ˈniː].) (lit. 'recitation of the Shahnameh'), is a specialized form of naqqali (the traditional Iranian art of dramatic storytelling), consisting of the public recitation of Ferdowsi's Shahnameh. These performances are typically delivered by naqqals (professional storytellers who recite the Shahnameh as well as other Iranian folktales and mythologies). Naqqals who specialize in the recitation of the Shahnameh are known as Shahnameh-khans (Note: Modern Iranian Persian singular: شاهنامه‌خوان, romanized: Šâhnâme-xân, pronounced [ʃɒːɦ.nɒː.me.ˈxɒːn].) or Shahnama-khwans. (Note: Early New Persian and Classical Persian singular: شاهنامه‌خوان, romanized: Šāhnāma-xwān, reconstructed pronunciation: [ʃaːh.naː.ma.ˈxʷaːn].)

Shahnameh-khani has been described as "an art form altogether different from drama and film, in which the reciting performer only narrates the myth and does not impersonate it." It ranks among "the most popular forms of epic and heroic story-telling" in Iran.

== History ==
The tradition of Shahnameh-khani has been practiced for centuries in the cities and villages of Iran. According to Anthony Shay, sacred Iranian performative practices such as rowzeh-khani and ta'ziyeh "have direct roots to the related and corresponding non-sacred practices of shah-nameh-khani, naqqali, and siyah-bazi theatre."

== Significance ==
In response to Roy Mottahedeh and other scholars' claim that Iranian identity may have been limited to educated elites in earlier historical periods, Anthony Shay has suggested, in contrast, that the long-standing traditions of naqqali and Shahnameh-khani indicate that this identity was more widely shared, "among several classes of the urban milieu at least, if not the peasantry".

== Regional variations ==
A similar yet distinct form of this tradition exists in Kurdistan with oral performances of the Kurdish Shahnameh which contains only parts of Ferdowsi's work alongside original stories.

== Sources ==
- Dabashi, Hamid (1993). Parviz Sayyad's Theater of Diaspora.
- Dabashi, Hamid (2007). Iran: A People Interrupted.
- Djalili, Mohammad-Reza (2005). Géopolitique de l'Iran (in French).
- Ghaderi, Farangis (2017). "The Literary Legacy of the Ardalans". Kurdish Studies Archive. 5.
- Jahandideh, Mitra; Khaefi, Shahab (2013). "The Most Important Performing Arts Arisen from Shahnameh of Ferdowsi: Shahnameh-khani and Naqqali of Shahnameh". Journal of the Indiana Academy of the Social Sciences. 16 (2).
- Karimi, Pamela (2022). Alternative Iran: Contemporary Art and Critical Spatial Practice.
- Shay, Anthony (1999). Choreophobia: Solo Improvised Dance in the Iranian World.
- Yamamoto, Kumiko (2017). "The Barzunama as told by storytellers". Shahnama Studies.
