= Vanzha =

Hindu weavers caste

The Vanzha are a Hindu caste found in the state of Gujarat in India. They are also known as Vanzhara.

== History and origin ==
The Vanzha are traditionally associated with the craft of weaving. They claim to be Rajputs who were saved from extermination by the Hindu goddess Hinglaj mata, who saved them from being exterminated on the condition that they take up weaving. The Vanzha are found mainly in Saurashtra and speak the Kathiawari dialect of Gujarati. They are further divided into a number of clans, each of whom are exogamous.

== Present circumstances ==
The Vanzha remain weavers, and weave both cotton and silk clothes. A few Vanzha have now take up tailoring as an occupation. They are Hindu and many follow the cult of the Ramdev Pir.

== See also ==
- Salvi
