= Ma'rekeh-giri =

Traditional Iranian street performance

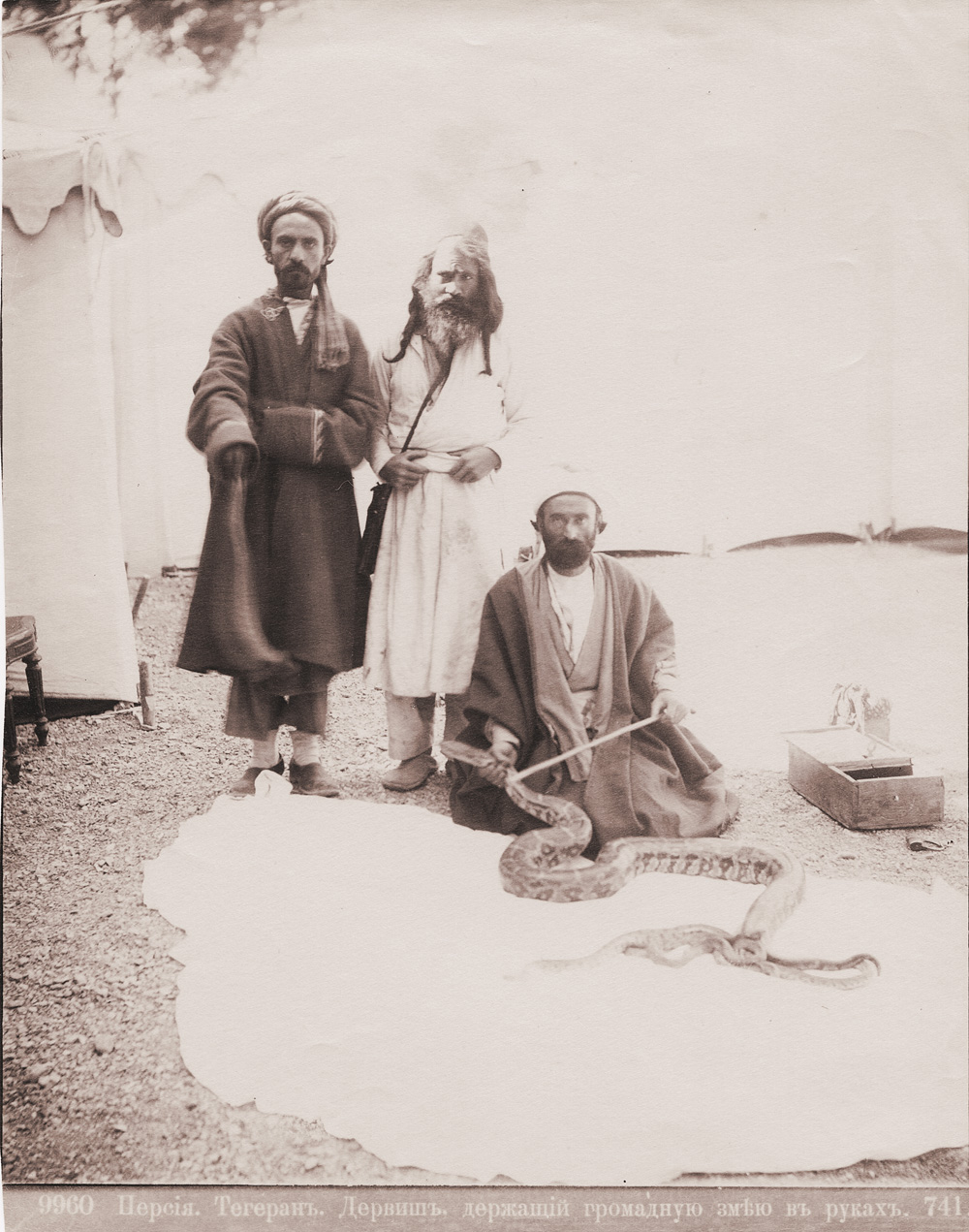
Persian dervish, holding a huge snake in his arms (1870s)

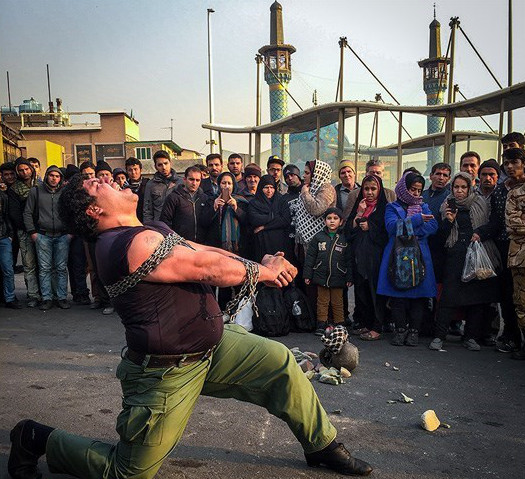
Ma'rekeh-giri in Tajrish Square, Tehran (2014)

Ma'rekeh-giri (Iranian Persian: معرکه‌گیری, romanized: maʿreke-giri, lit. 'fighting or combat'), also spelled mareke giri, is a type of traditional street performance in Iran. The ma'rekeh-gir is a person who entertains people with his "special powers", such as breaking chains with his arms, breaking stones with his hands, handling big cats, and/or handling snakes.

Ma'rekeh-giri performances are free shows in public locations; viewers will give the performer some money to encourage them. Occasionally the shows will have a mix religious undertones, and sometimes an element of fraud will occur.

== See also ==
- Persian theatre, history of entertainment in Iran
- Pahlevani and zoorkhaneh rituals, traditional system of athletics for men in Iran

== Sources ==
- Keshmirshekan, Hamid (2019). Contemporary Art, World Cinema, and Visual Culture.
