= Van Baoria =

Van Baoria, also known as Barwa are a Schedule caste community found in the state of Rajasthan in India.

== History and origin ==
According to their tribal traditions, when Lord Rama was looking for his spouse Sita, he came across the Van Baoria. They claimed ignorance of Sita, and as such were cursed by Rama to dwell in the jungle for eternity. The community is found in the districts of Alwar, Jhunjhunu, Bikaner, Churu, Sikar and Ganganagar. They speak the Shekhawati language.

The Van Baoria are strictly endogamous, and practice clan exogamy. Their main clans are the Vad Gujar, Param Veldo, Meowoti, Chandia and Gelot. They are a Hindu community, and their tribal deity is Kalka Mata. The Van Baoria are essentially involved with hunting and gathering. Like many tribal communities in India, they are undergoing a process of settlement and assimilation. Many are now employed as wage labourers, and their economic situation is extremely precarious.

== See also ==
- Dalit
- List of Scheduled castes in Rajasthan
