= Persian theatre =

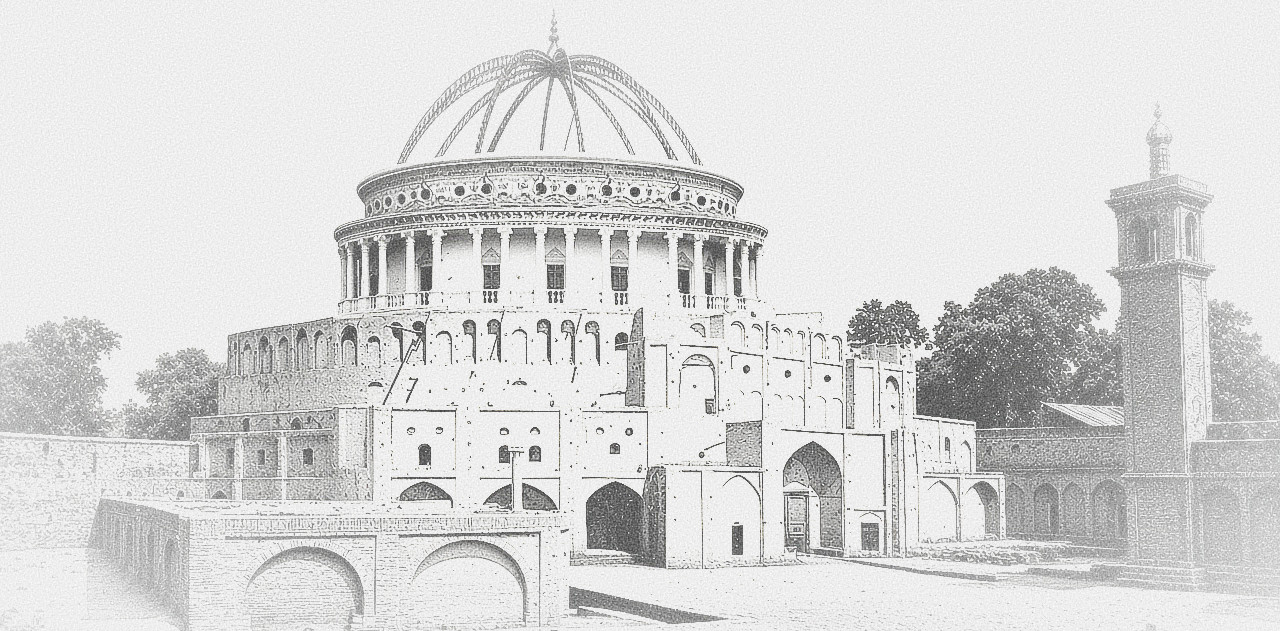
The royal theater Takyeh Dowlat, opened in 1868, was the largest theater in Iranian history

Persian theater (Persian: تئاتر ایرانی) goes back to antiquity. Ancient Persian theatre and dance was significantly researched by the Greek historian Herodotus of Halikarnassos, who lived during the Persian rule in Greece. In his work Book IX (Calliope), he describes the history of Asian empires and also the Persian wars until 478 BC.

== Historical Persian theatre ==
These are a few of the dramatic performing arts that became popularized in Iran in 7th century AD, long before the advent of cinema. A few examples include:

- Naqqali (storytelling)
- Qavvali (minstrelsy)
- Shahnameh-khani (singing storytelling performance of the story of Shahnameh)
- Rowzeh-khani (mourning performance)
- Sayeh-bazi (shadow plays)
- Mirnowruzi (comic play during Nowruz)
- Kachalak-bazi or Pahlavan Kachal (comic play with a bald clown-like character)
- Baqqal-bazi (comic play that takes place at a grocery store)

=== Naqqali ===
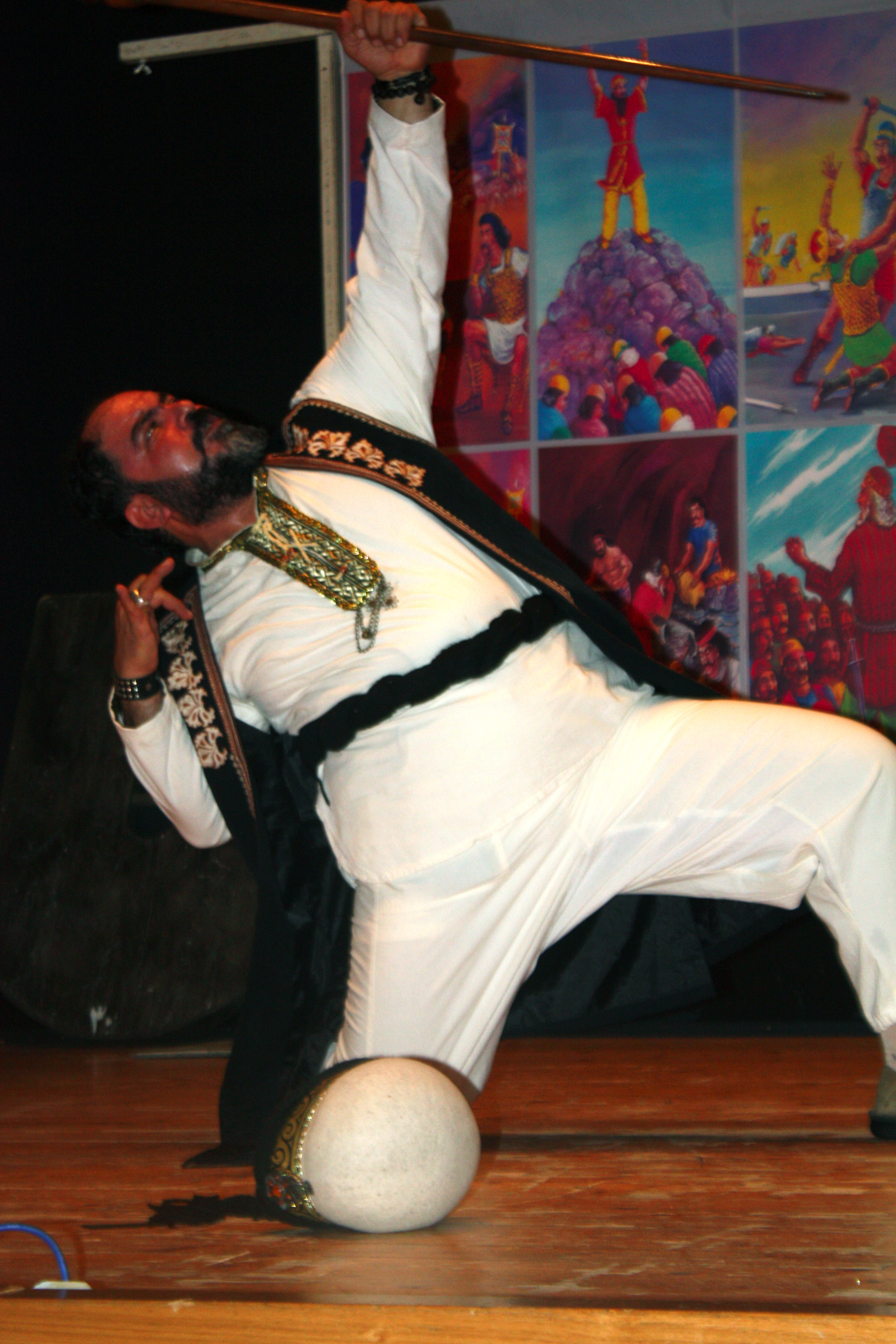
Iranian actor doing naqqqli

Naqqali is one of the oldest forms of the traditional Persian theatre. The Naqqāl is the performer and recounts stories in prose often accompanied by music, dance and decorative, painted scrolls. The performer often wears simple costumes and a single piece of a historical but related costume, like one old piece of armour. This art was formerly performed in coffeehouses, private houses and historical venues such as ancient caravanserais. A decline in the popularity of coffeehouses in Iran, and with new forms of entertainment, has resulted in diminishing interest in naqqali performance. The aging of master performers, (who are called morsheds) and the decreasing popularity among younger generations have caused a steep drop in the number of skilled naqqals, threatening the survival of this dramatic art. Naqqali was included in 2011 to the UNESCO's Representative List of the Intangible Cultural Heritage of Humanity in need of urgent safeguarding. Other similar Iranian story-telling and performance traditions include naqqali, pardeh-dari, pardeh-khani, qavvali (minstrelsy), Shahnameh-khani, ta'ziyeh.

=== Ta'ziyeh ===
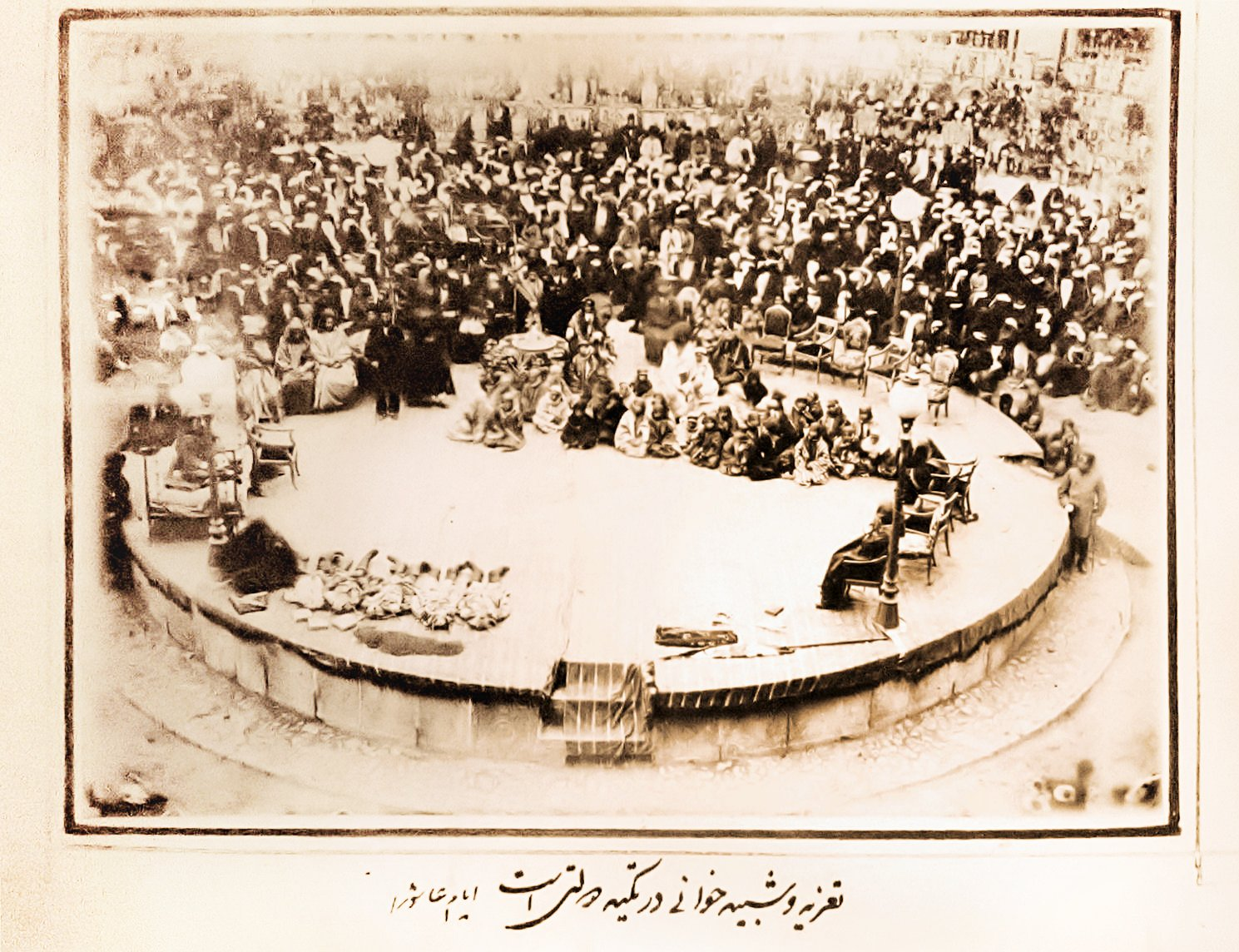
A ta'ziyeh performance as theater in the round

Ta'ziyeh is a form of traditional, religious Persian theatre in which the drama is conveyed through music, narration, prose and singing. It is sometimes referred to as "condolence theater", inspired by a historical and religious event such as the Shi'i martyr plays. Ta'ziyeh dates from before the Islamic era. A common theme is the epic tragedy of Siyavash in Ferdowsi's Shahnameh. In Persian tradition, ta'ziyeh and pardeh-khani are inspired by historical and religious events, and symbolize epic spirit and resistance. The common theme is hero tales of love, sacrifice, and resistance against evil. Ta'ziyeh resembles the European opera in many respects.

=== Kheymeh-shab-bazi ===
Kheymeh-shab-bazi is the Persian traditional marionette puppetry which is performed in a small chambered tent. The tent is open from one side only and there are two people involved in the performance: a musical performer and a person telling the story (called a morshed). The dialogue is between morshed and the puppets. The method of performance, its characters and the techniques used in writing the puppet show make it unique and distinguish it from other types of puppetry.

A newer genre of Iranian puppetry, Shah-Salim-bazi emerged under the Qajar dynasty. Puppetry is still very common in contemporary Iran.

=== Siyah-bazi and ru-howzi ===
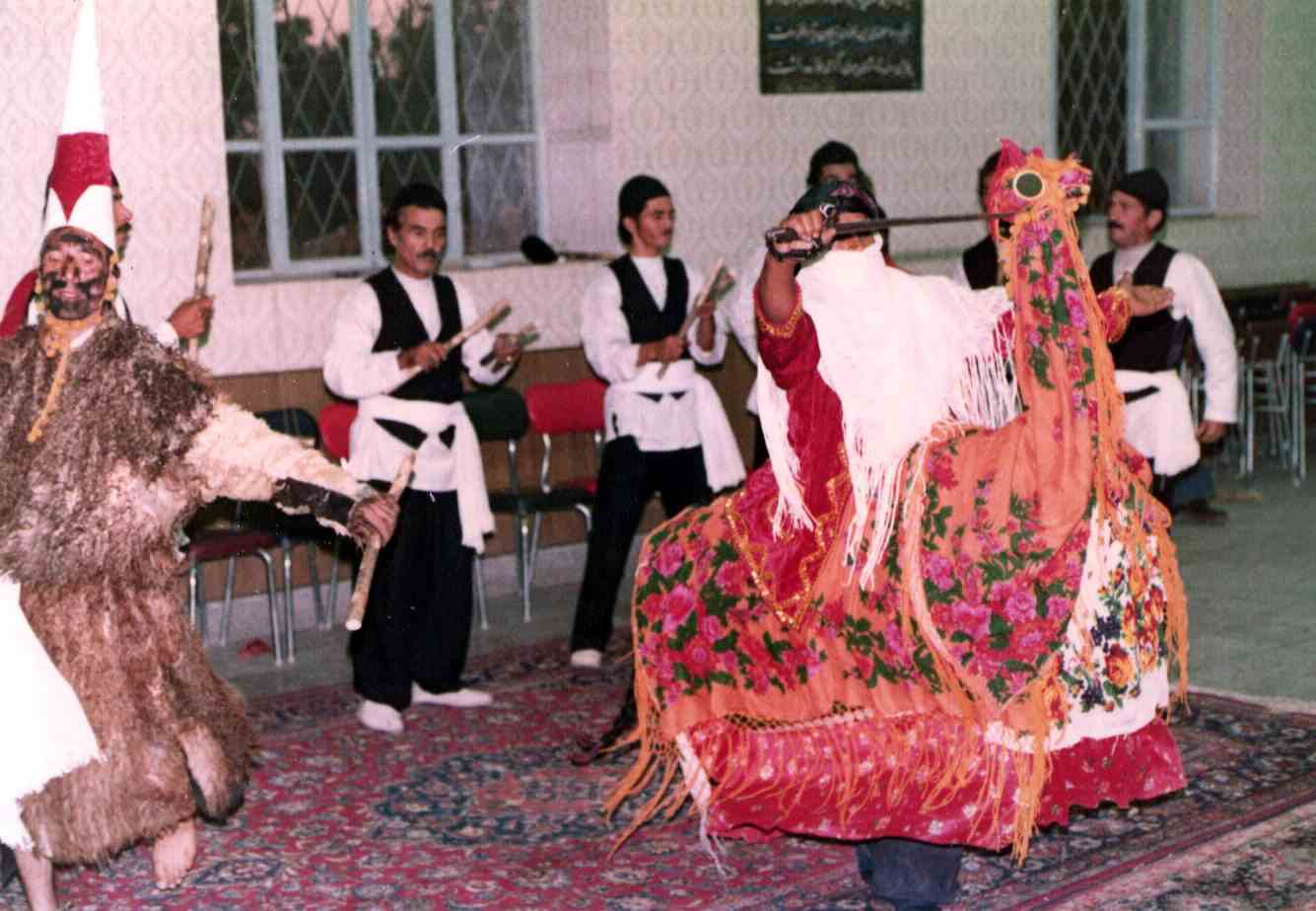
A siyah-bazi performing

Siyah-bazi, also written siah-bazi, is a type of Iranian folk performing art that features a blackface, mischievous and forthright harlequin that does improvisations to stir laughter. The term siyah-bazi literally translates to "playing black" and is a sketch in which two men dressed in red turbans, one has black face paint and they engage in a verbal duel which is often witty, political in nature and humorous. The character with the black face takes on a clown-like role and tries to disgrace the master. Outwardly the master appears to be a respectable person but underneath he is immoral and not to be respected. The blackface character is portrayed as a carnivalesque underdog of the working class and the audience can empathize with their struggle through humor. Siah-bazi has been compared to American minstrel theater and has similar controversy.

Ru-howzi is an improvised comical theatre act on domestic life. Ru-howzi has no written texts and is practiced through rehearsals and oral traditions and as a result each troupe may have unique features to the performance. The performances often involve shtick comic routines mimicking other languages/dialects, and physical or visual humor.

Siyah-bazi and ru-howzi both have a blackface clown character and involve lewd jokes, but ru-howzi is a social theatre that satirizes domestic life and is often performed at private Iranian residences on a stage over a pool of water that is often found in home courtyards. Siyah-bazi is performed in more public places like theaters or coffee houses because of the political subject matter.

The Iranian Revolution affected the tone and performance of siyah-bazi, and they edited away the sexual references, dancing and music. The performances continue only because of the acceptance of the standards of the Islamic Iranian Revolution.

=== Pardeh-dari and pardeh-khani ===
Pardeh-dari was introduced under the Qajar dynasty and is a screen-based storytelling act with painted images held by the performer as a narrative tool. Similarly, pardeh khani is visual storytelling read off a screen on a wall, often a wall in a coffee house. It is often found in connection to ta'ziyeh theatre acts. It required a lot of expense and preparation, therefore was more commonly seen in towns. The storyteller is called a pardeh khan, and in the process of performing they would use a pointer to visually emphasize the story. The imagery found in these types of performances can be separated into three categories, epic paintings (stories such as the Shahnameh, the Death of Siyâvash, Rostam and Sohrab, among others), romantic paintings, and religious paintings.

== Contemporary Iranian theatre ==
The contemporary theatre seen today in Iran is largely alike Western traditions of performance that developed during the twentieth century. The most influential among these are modernism, Theatre of the Absurd, the poor theater, and postmodernism. While contemporary Iranian theatre builds off these movements, modern theatre artists have created a unique, culturally-specific style of theatre that blends Western styles with traditional modes of Persian performance.

At the start of the twentieth century, Iran's relationship with industrial nations fundamentally changed. With the global demand for fossil fuels growing rapidly, the 1909 discovery of oil in Abadan, Iran, made the nation's relationship with the West (particularly the United Kingdom, United States, and France) heightened to a state of mutual reliance. These foreign nations developed close alliances with the Iranian monarchies, and cultural exchange flourished between Iran and Europe. Persian translations of plays by Shakespeare, Ibsen, and Chekhov, etc were the first taste of a Western theatrical aesthetic for much of the Iranian public, and this style of playwriting was very influential on Iran's earliest native playwrights. Some of the prominent translators of theaterical works in Iran are Mirza Fatali Akhundzade, Dariush Mo'addabian, Ahmad Kamyabi Mask, Reza Shirmarz, Hamid Samandarian, Sadreddin Zahed, Parwiz Sayyād, etc.

The 1960s was a time of great artistic and literary output in Iran, fueled by a new generation of Iranian writers, artists, and intellectuals. A modern form of Iranian playwriting grew out of this movement, led by the luminaries Bahram Beyzai, Akbar Radi, Ali Nassirian, and Bijan Mofid. These playwrights found inspiration in the works of Samuel Beckett, Bertolt Brecht, Eugène Ionesco, and their contemporaries, although their work also builds on Persian styles such as puppetry, ru howzi, and naghali.

The first Iranian school of theatre, Madrese-ye Ta'atr-i Shahrdari, was opened in 1939 by a collection of Iranian theatre artists, and other schools soon followed. In 1964, the Faculty of Dramatic Arts was established, which became the first institution of higher education in Iran to offer a diploma equivalent to a Bachelor's degree. In 1965, the University of Tehran created the Faculty of Theatre, which finally incorporated theatrical pedagogy within already existing Iranian universities. The theatre program at the University of Tehran was particularly successful, and its influence can be seen throughout contemporary Iranian theatre-making. The Faculty of Theatre hired several U.S. drama professors to craft the program, with classes in acting, directing, theatre history, and design, and a focus on the Western dramatic cannon.

The university setting provided increased opportunities for theatrical experimentation, and out of this emerged a strong tradition of Iranian theatre direction. Hamid Samandarian, Ali Rafii, and Pari Saberi are among the most active and influential of this first generation of modern Iranian directors, and their theatre backgrounds all derive from a mixture of both experience and pedagogy within Iran and Europe.

=== After the Iranian Revolution (1979–present day) ===
Following the 1979 Iranian Revolution, the fate of this new modern theatre tradition became uncertain. Theatrical activity dramatically decreased during the devastating Iran–Iraq War in the 1980s, and aside from the occasional production, this burgeoning Iranian theatrical scene did not resurface until the 1990s.

Theatre under the Islamic Republic of Iran is governed by the Dramatic Arts Center and its umbrella organization, the Vizarate Farhang va Irshade Islami (Ministry of Culture and Islamic Guidance). The government-controlled agency has been criticized for its censorship of artists and ideas that are believed to be "Anti-Islamic" or in opposition to the political loyalties of the Iranian government. Nevertheless, Iranian theatre artists continue to navigate these regulations, and new works are flourishing, particularly in the capital city of Tehran.

In modern times, Bahram Beyzai has made the most significant contribution in the historiography of Persian theatre with his seminal book, A Study on Iranian Theatre (1965). Other works include Willem Floor's book, The History of Theater in Iran (2005), and William O. Beeman's book, Iranian Performance Traditions (2011).

== Iranian diaspora theatre ==
The Darvag Theater Group was founded in 1984 in Berkeley, California by former Iranian student activists. They have produced and staged plays in the English language and in Persian; including plays by non-Iranian playwrights. Golden Thread Productions (also known as the Golden Thread Company) was founded in 1996 by Torange Yeghiazarian in the San Francisco, California, embracing the multiplicity of Western Asia including Iran.

Silk Road Rising (formally Silk Road Theatre Project) was founded in 2003 in Chicago by Malik Gillani and Jamil Khoury. Silk Road Rising presents work by playwrights from Asian descent including Iranian.

== See also ==
- Dances in Iran
- Persian cinema
- Persian culture
- Hajji Firuz
- Culture of Iran
- Iranian stand-up comedy
- Iranian theatre directors
- Performing arts
