= Singiwala =

Muslim community in Rajasthan, India

The Singiwala are a Muslim community, found in the state of Rajasthan in India. They also known as Jheewar Bangalee. Many members of Singiwala community that have migrated to Pakistan after independence have settled in Karachi, Sindh.

== See also ==
- Dalit
- List of Scheduled castes in Rajasthan
