= Anthony Shay =

Anthony Shay is a dancer and choreographer specializing in dances from Eastern Europe, the Middle East, North Africa, and Central Asia. In 50 years of work he has created over 200 choreographies.

Shay created and directed several dance groups: Village Dancers, AMAN Folk Ensemble (AMAN International Music and Dance Company, Los Angeles, California, 1963–1977), and AVAZ International Dance Theatre (since 1977).

In 1977 Shay earned a Ph.D. in dance history and theory from the University of California, Riverside, where he teaches dances of Iranian culture and M.A. degrees in anthropology, folklore and mythology from California State University, Los Angeles and UCLA.

On November 18, 1995, Shay received commendations from President Bill Clinton and the City Council of Los Angeles for excellence of his choreographies, honoring his forty years as a choreographic artist, during which he created over 150 works. The Kaleidescope Festival has designated him as Distinguished California Artist in 1997.

Dr. Anthony Shay has been awarded a James Irvine Fellowship in Dance for 1998 as one of the eight top choreographers in California with a $30,000 fellowship for research in Iranian art.

In 1999, he received the Dance Resource Center of Greater Los Angeles Lester Horton award for Outstanding Achievement for the Staging of Traditional Dance. He is a five-time recipient of choreographic fellowship awards from the National Endowment for the Arts. He is also an author of several books about dance, and has published numerous articles in the Oxford Encyclopedia of Dance, the Journal of Iranian Studies, Dance Research Journal, and the Journal of Visual Anthropology.

In 2002, the California Arts Council awarded him the Lifetime Achievement Award for “His Incomparable Service to the Art of Dance.” Congress on Research in Dance honored, among others, Anthony Shay in 2003 (Dance Magazine, September 2003).

== Bibliography ==
- Choreophobia: Solo Improvised Dance in the Iranian World. Mazda Publishers, ISBN 1-56859-083-0 (1999)
- Choreographic Politics: State Folk Dance Ensembles, Representation and Power, Wesleyan University Press, 2002.
- Belly Dance: Orientalism, Transnationalism, And Harem Fantasy (Bibliotheca Iranica. Performing Arts Series) by Anthony Shay and Barbara Sellers-Young, 2005
- Choreographing Identities: Folk Dance, Ethnicity And Festival in the United States And Canada, 2006
- Choreographic Politics: State Folk Dance Companies, Representation, and Power, Wesleyan University Press, 2002, ISBN 0-8195-6520-2
