= Berwa =

Caste of India

The Berwa, also called Bairwa, is an OBC caste in Delhi and a Schedule Caste found in Rajasthan. In 1946, a movement of the Bairwa cultivators was launched by the All India State People Bairwa Mahasabha in Uniara against its policy of not allowing them to carry on the agriculturist profession. The movement ran till 1949 when the rule got abolished.

== Traditions ==
The Bairwa and Meena tribe have similar customs and traditions because Bairwas are mostly found in eastern Rajasthan where there is a high concentration of Meena tribe's population. Their population in the 1981 census was 429, 627, which has increased to 1,260,685 in the 2011 census in the State of Rajasthan and also have fair amount of population in the state of Madhya Pradesh, Delhi. They are mainly concentrated in the Tonk, Kota, Bundi, and Jaipur districts of Rajasthan and also have a significant population in Indore and Ujjain district of Madhya Pradesh.

They follow Hindu marriage practices. However, widows are allowed to marry, there is no child betrothal and polygyny is allowed. Vermilion, bangles and toe rings are some symbols of marriage for women. Most of their workers were cultivators. They speak Dingal and use Devanagari characters. They adhere to Hinduism including all of its gods and goddesses and are non-vegetarians. They are endogamous and cremate their dead also women and men can seek divorce. They were recognized as Scheduled Caste by the Constitution (Scheduled Caste) Order in 1950. They have socio-political body of their own called Chorasi Panchayat. It deals with the breach of caste norms and other issues.
