= Bargi (caste) =

Hindu caste from northern India

The Bargi are a Hindu caste found in the states of Rajasthan and Uttar Pradesh in India. They have been granted Scheduled Caste status in Rajasthan, and their population according 2001 Census of India was 10,739.

== Origin ==
The Bargi claim descent from the Bargala Rajputs, and their historic homeland is the ancient region of Braj Desa, which now forms parts of Mathura and Agra districts of Uttar Pradesh and the districts of Bharatpur and Dholpur in Rajasthan. The Bargi have now spread to Jaipur District as well, and they speak Braj Bhasha, although many in Rajasthan now understand Rajasthani.

== See also ==
- Bargala
