= Bairwa =

Caste

The Bairwa is an OBC caste in Delhi & Haryana and a Scheduled Caste (in Rajasthan) of India's Affirmative Action. Berwa means the people who live without enmity.

The Bairwa community live in the Hadauti, in Rajasthan. Bairwa community also live in Haryana, UP, Madhya Pradesh and Delhi.

== Bairwa vs Jatav (Same or Different) ==
Bairwa aur Jatav do alag-alag Scheduled Caste communities hain — Rajasthan ki official SC list mein Bairwa/Berwa ko independent SC Code 05 diya gaya hai (2011 census population: 1,260,686), jabki Jatav "Chamar, Bhambhi, Jatia, Jatav, Mochi, Raidas, Regar" wale separate group ke antargat aata hai; yahi pattern Delhi ki SC list mein bhi dikhta hai jahan Chamar/Jatav cluster alag entry hai aur Bairwa uss list mein hai hi nahi (Bairwa Delhi mein OBC hai, Central List of OBCs, Entry No. 8 — Bairwa, Berwa), jo confirm karta hai ki dono states ki official government classification mein dono castes hamesha separate treat ki gayi hain.

Bairwa and Jatav are two distinct Scheduled Caste communities — in Rajasthan's official SC list, Bairwa/Berwa is assigned an independent SC Code 05 (2011 census population: 1,260,686), whereas Jatav falls under the separate group "Chamar, Bhambhi, Jatia, Jatav, Mochi, Raidas, Regar." The same pattern is seen in Delhi's SC list, where the Chamar/Jatav cluster is a distinct entry and Bairwa does not appear in that list at all (Bairwa is classified as OBC in Delhi, Central List of OBCs, Entry No. 8 — Bairwa, Berwa). This confirms that in the official government classification of both states, the two castes have always been treated as separate.
