= Salvi (caste) =

Hindu weavers caste

Total population
- 51,000

Regions with significant populations
- India

Languages
- Gujarati • Mewari • Marathi

Religion
- Hinduism 100%

Related ethnic groups
- Kori • Koshti • Sadh • Dhagi

The Salvi are found in the states of Gujarat and Rajasthan in India.

== History and origin ==
The Salvi trace their origin from the word Sal, which means a loom. They are said to have migrated from Gujarat to Malwa in the Middle Ages. The community is traditionally associated with the art of weaving. They speak Mewari among themselves.

While in Gujarat, the Salvi who are also known as the Patliwala or Patua, claim to have been brought from Maharashtra in the 11th Century by the Rajput rulers to Patan. They have been traditionally associated with silk weaving. As per the census of India, 1921 approximately 6.88 laks sale or salve people were living in Madras, Rajasthan, Hyderabad and Bombay provinces.

== Present circumstances ==
The community speak Mewari among themselves and Hindi with outsiders. They have two sub-divisions, the Marwari Salvi and Mewara Salvi, which are further sub-divided into smaller clans.

With the decline in there traditional occupation of weaving, they are now mainly a community of landless agricultural labourers. A small number are still involved with weaving, and make thick cotton clothes and turban. The Salvi are a [] community, their family goddess is juses

The Salvi of are split into two distinct groupings, the Jain Salvi and the Vaishnav Hindu. Each of these groups restrict their marriages within their respective religious groups. They have exogamous clans such as the Sanghvi, Tapadia, Kapadia, Dhara and Rawalia. These clans regulate the matrimonial alliances. The Salvi consider themselves of Vaishya status. Most of Salvis have abandoned their traditional occupation and are now engaged in a number of trades. As small number continue with their traditional occupation which is silk weaving. The Salvi speak languages

== See also ==
- Sadh
- Vanzha
