= Naqqali =

Persian epic storytelling

Iranian Naqqāli
- UNESCO Intangible Cultural Heritage
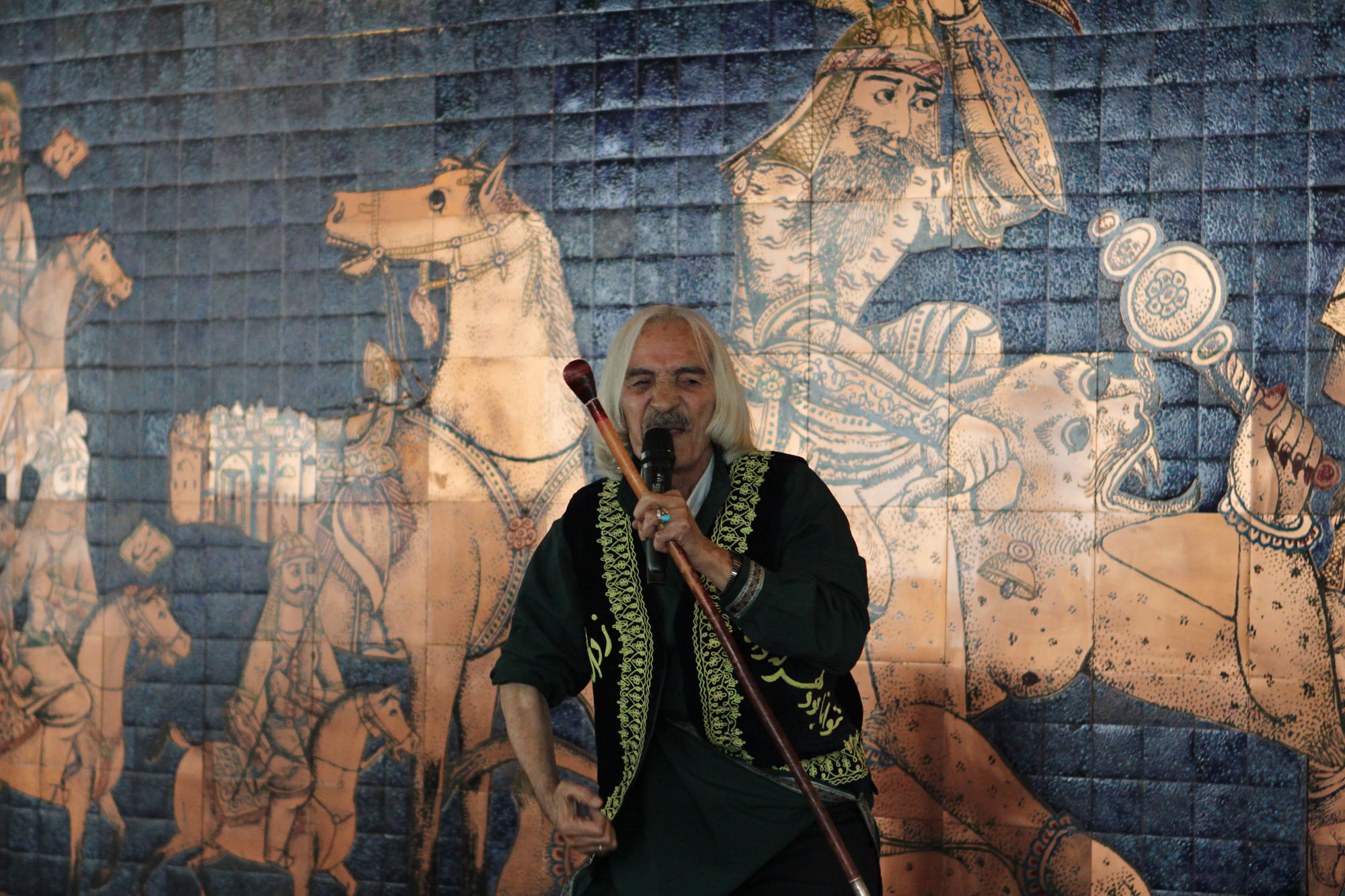
- Murshid Valiullah Torabi
- Country: Iran
- Reference: 00535
- Region: West Asia

Inscription history
- Inscription: 2011

Naqqali (Note: Classical Persian: نقالی, romanized: naqqālī.) or naghghali (Note: Modern Iranian Persian: نقالی, romanized: naġġâli.) (lit. 'storytelling; narration'), also known as Persian epic storytelling, is the oldest form of narrating tales in Iran and has long played a significant role in society. A naqqal (Note: Classical Persian: نقال, romanized: naqqāl.) or naghghal (Note: Modern Iranian Persian: نقال, romanized: naġġâl.) is a storyteller who recites epic tales, primarily revolving around the stories of Iranian mythological kings and heroes.

== Naqqal ==
A naqqal is a storyteller who recites poetry or prose using gestures, expressions, and sometimes music, along with descriptions of inscriptions and paintings. Naqqali requires an exceptional memory to retain poems and texts, as well as improvisational skills and eloquence. Their attire is typically simple, though they may wear an ancient-style hat or armored coats during performances to depict battle scenes.

== History ==
As guardians of folk culture, epic and ethnic stories, and Iranian folk music, naqqāls were historically known for their performances in coffeehouses and historic sites such as caravanserais. However, with the decline of traditional coffeehouses, the disappearance of caravanserais, and the rise of modern entertainment forms, as well as neglect in the cultural sphere, the audience for this dramatic Iranian art has gradually diminished.

During the golden age of coffeehouses, from the early 17th century to the early 20th century, a significant number of naqqāls turned to these establishments, making them centers for naqqāli and Shahnameh-khani (recitation of the Shahnameh). In this period, coffeehouses played an active role in transmitting Iran’s ancient national and religious culture and literature to the largely illiterate or semi-literate masses. They were crucial in educating visitors about the traditions, ethics, and values of past heroes and champions.

== Types ==
Based on their storytelling style and level of expertise, naqqāls were classified into three categories:

- Shahnameh-khans (reciters of the Shahnameh), who exclusively narrated the epic stories from Ferdowsi's Shahnameh.
- Historical and legendary storytellers, who specialized in recounting tales such as the Iskandarnameh (Alexander Romance).
- Religious storytellers, who performed sacred narratives like the Hamzehnāmeh and Heydarnāmeh.

Each storyteller had their own unique method of narration. Key aspects of their performance included energetic and engaging delivery, understanding the audience’s mood, blending prose with verse to prevent monotony, singing poetry with melody, explaining difficult verses, paying tribute to poets, and incorporating religious invocations such as fātiḥa (prayers for the deceased) and takbīr (praising God).

== Naqqali's UNESCO Recognition ==
The process of registering naqqāli as an Intangible Cultural Heritage of Humanity was carried out through the collaboration of Iran's Cultural Heritage and Tourism Organization, the Ferdowsi Foundation, the Iranian House of Theater, and the Center for Performing Arts. Naqqāli was officially inscribed on UNESCO’s Representative List of the Intangible Cultural Heritage of Humanity during the 6th session of the Intergovernmental Committee for the Safeguarding of Intangible Cultural Heritage on 27 November 2011.

== See also ==
- Ferdowsi
- Shahnameh
  - Shahnameh-khani
- Persian theatre
- Meddah
- Halqa
- Ashik
- Griot
- Al-Qaskhun
