= List of Scheduled Castes in Madhya Pradesh =

The Scheduled Castes population of Madhya Pradesh is 11,342,320 of total population of state being 72,626,809 as per 2011 census, accounting for 15.62% of total. The Government of Madhya Pradesh has recognized a total of 48 communities in the list of Scheduled Castes in the state.

== List ==
1. Audhelia
2. Bagri, Bagdi (excluding Rajput, Thakur sub-castes among Bagri, Bagdi)
3. Bahna, Bahana
4. Balahi, Balai
5. Banchada
6. Barahar, Basod
7. Bargunda
8. Basor, Burud, Bansor, Bansodi, Bansphor, Basar
9. Bedia
10. Beldar, Sunkar
11. Bhangi, Mehtar, Balmik, Lalbegi, Dharkar
12. Bhanumati
13. Chadar
14. Chamar, Chamari, Bairwa, Bhambi, Jatav, Mochi, Regar, Nona, Rohidas, Ramnami, Satnami, Surjyabanshi, Surjyaramnami, Ahirwar, Chamar Mangan, Raidas, suryavanshi, choudhary
15. Chidar
16. Chikwa, Chikvi
17. Chitar
18. Dahait, Dahayat, Dahat
19. Dewar
20. Dhanuk
21. Dhed, Dher
22. Dhobi (in Bhopal, Raisen and Sehore districts)
23. Dohor
24. Dom, Dumar, Dome, Domar, Doris
25. Ganda, Gandi
26. Ghasi, Ghasia
27. Holiya
28. Kanjar
29. Katia, Patharia
30. Khangar, Kanera, Mirdha
31. Khatik
32. Koli, Kori
33. Kotwal (in Bhind, Dhar, Dewas, Guna, Gwalior, Indore, Jhabua, Khargone, Mandsaur, Morena, Rajgarh, Ratlam, Shajapur, Shivpuri, Ujjain and Vidisha districts)a
34. Kuchbandhia
35. Kumhar (in Chhatarpur, Datia, Panna, Rewa, Satna, Shahdol, Sidhi and Tikamgarh districts)b
36. Mahar, Mehra, Mehar, Mahara
37. Mang, Mang Garodi, Mang Garudi, Dankhni Mang, Mang Mahasi, Madari, Garudi, Radhe Mang
38. Meghwal
39. Moghia
40. Muskhan
41. Nat, Kalbelia, Sapera, Navdigar, Kubutar
42. Pardhi (in Bhind, Dhar, Dewas, Guna, Gwalior, Indore, Jhabua, Khargone, Mandsaur, Morena, Rajgarh, Ratlam, Shajapur, Shivpuri, Ujjain and Vidisha districts)a
43. Pasi
44. Rujjhar
45. Sansi, Sansia
46. Sargara
47. Silawat
48. Zamral

== Demographics ==
=== Community wise ===
Scheduled Castes		Total (2011)	
Code	Communities	Population	Percent
001	Audhelia	78	<0.001
002	Bagri, Bagdi (except for Rajput, Thakur sub-castes)	2,97,861	2.626
003	Bahna, Bahana	325	0.003
004	Balahi, Balai	13,31,098	11.735
005	Banchhada	32,624	0.288
006	Barahar, Basor	1,02,157	0.901
007	Bargunda	30,280	0.267
008	Bansphor, etc.	3,15,640	2.783
009	Bedia	26,794	0.236
010	Beldar, Sunhar	33,704	0.297
011	Bhangi, Mehtar, Balmik, Lalbegi, Dharkor	3,65,769	3.225
012	Bhanumati	1,788	0.016
013	Chadar	1,31,444	1.159
014	Chamar, Jatav, Ahirwar, etc.	53,68,217	47.329
015	Chidar	36,257	0.320
016	Chikwa, Chakwa	3,566	0.031
017	Chitar	175	0.001
018	Dahait, Dahayat, Dahat	54,735	0.482
019	Dewar	243	0.002
020	Dhanuk	1,05,546	0.930
021	Dhed, Dher	210	0.001
022	Dhobi	46,575	0.410
023	Dohor	38,038	0.335
024	Dom, etc.	45,728	0.403
025	Ganda, Gandi	1,252	0.011
026	Ghasi, Ghasia	8,397	0.074
027	Holeya	16,192	0.143
028	Kanjar	18,216	0.161
029	Katia, Pathariya	1,70,672	1.505
030	Khatik	1,61,026	1.419
031	Koli, Kori	6,56,569	5.789
032	Kotwal	15,720	0.139
033	Khangar, Kanera, Mirdha	1,77,232	1.562
034	Kuchbandhia	25,970	0.229
035	Kumhar	2,49,794	2.203
036	Mahar, etc.	8,19,416	7.224
037	Mang, Garodi, etc.	29,259	0.258
038	Meghwal	81,148	0.715
039	Moghia	49,580	0.437
040	Muskhan	212	0.002
041	Nat, Kalbelia, etc.	1,11,465	0.983
042	Pardhi	26,793	0.236
043	Pasi	51,582	0.455
044	Rujjhar	1,619	0.014
045	Sansi, Sansia	6,731	0.059
046	Silawat	53,770	0.474
047	Zamral	6,844	0.060
048	Sargara	5,662	0.049
Generic castes, (those who identified them as Dalit, Harijan, Anusuchit Jati, etc.)		2,28,347	2.013
		11,342,320	100%

=== District wise ===
District		Scheduled Castes		
Name	Population (2011)	Population	Percent	Top 3 (largest communities)
Bhopal	2,371,061	357,516	15.08	Chamar (123,368); Mahar (57,636); Balmiki (23,272)
Raisen	1,331,597	225,891	16.96	Chamar (106,815); Dhanuk (20,666); Dhobi (19,761)
Rajgarh	1,545,814	295,718	19.13	Chamar (174,857); Balai (44,742); Balmiki (9,985)
Sehore	1,311,332	271,281	20.68	Balai (120,803); Chamar (99,877); Dhobi (7,223)
Vidisha	1,458,875	292,144	20.02	Chamar (203,246); Koli (221,360); Balmiki (10,181)
Morena	1,965,970	421,519	21.44	Chamar (308,617); Koli (56,066); Khatik (16,175)
Bhind	1,703,005	374,799	22.01	Chamar (245,696); Koli (42,510); Khangar (18,225)
Sheopur	687,861	108,391	15.76	Chamar (80,370); Koli (12,724); Balmiki (4,000)
Gwalior	2,032,036	393,068	19.34	Chamar (222,656); Koli (71,482); Balmiki (27,958)
Ashoknagar	845,071	175,764	20.79	Chamar (123,168); Koli (11,296); Balmiki (6,945)
Datia	786,754	200,270	25.45	Chamar (107,122); Koli (19,991); Khangar (17,745)
Guna	1,241,519	193,115	15.55	Chamar (124,409); Balmiki (11,626); Koli (11,216)
Shivpuri	1,726,050	321,515	18.63	Chamar (196,062); Khangar (37,365); Koli (28,107)
Indore	3,276,697	545,239	16.64	Chamar (169,522); Balai (161,041); Koli (39,573)
Alirajpur	728,999	26,877	3.69	Dhanuk (9,380); Kotwal (5,269); Chamar (3,481)
Barwani	1,385,881	87,991	6.35	Balai (32,615); Koli (26,250); Kotwal (6,503)
Burhanpur	757,847	64,254	8.48	Mahar (35,535); Koli (8,643); Chamar (6,320)
Dhar	2,185,793	145,436	6.65	Balai (67,593); Chamar (37,826); Bagdi (8,887)
Jhabua	1,025,048	11,427	1.11	Chamar (7,973); Basor (2,674); Balai (1,878)
Khandwa	1,310,061	156,601	11.95	Balai (104,260); Chamar (22,445); Balmiki (5,876)
Khargone	1,873,046	209,091	11.16	Balai (155,948); Chamar (21,903); Koli (6,100)
Jabalpur	2,463,289	348,029	14.13	Chamar (127,333); Mahar (60,104); Bansphor (28,966)
Balaghat	1,701,698	125,426	7.37	Mahar (92,797); Chamar (14,406); Katia (7,105)
Chhindwara	2,090,922	232,244	11.11	Mahar (110,480); Chamar (50,422); Katia (46,243)
Dindori	704,524	39,782	5.65	Mahar (30,210); Chamar (7,563); Ghasi (352)
Katni	1,292,042	155,717	12.05	Chamar (89,976); Bansphor (13,385); Dahait (11,488)
Mandla	1,054,905	48,425	4.59	Mahar (25,543); Chamar (9,263); Katia (6,753)
Narsinghpur	1,091,854	184,155	16.87	Chamar (81,596); Mahar (53,047); Bansphor (12,511)
Seoni	1,379,131	130,797	9.48	Mahar (58,339); Katia (23,885); Chamar (22,246)
Narmadapuram	1,241,350	205,007	16.51	Chamar (98,457); Mahar (36,086); Katia (25,481)
Betul	1,575,362	159,296	10.11	Mahar (112,065); Chamar (18,286); Katia (12,328)
Harda	570,465	92,865	16.28	Balai (30,328); Katia (26,961); Chamar (17,780)
Rewa	2,365,106	383,508	16.21	Chamar (259,475); Kumhar (36,429); Koli (25,334)
Satna	3,084,963	398,569	12.91	Chamar (241,807); Kumhar (37,517); Koli (36,064)
Sidhi	1,127,033	130,202	11.55	Chamar (78,304); Kumhar (19,822); Koli (13,765)
Singrauli	1,178,273	150,664	12.79	Chamar (96,360); Bansphor (17,718); Kumhar (16,749)
Sagar	2,378,458	501,630	21.09	Chamar (346,045); Chadar (49,374); Dhanuk (21,741)
Chhatarpur	1,762,375	405,313	22.99	Chamar (242,274); Kumhar (42,622); Koli (40,931)
Damoh	1,264,219	246,337	19.48	Chamar (163,348); Bansphor (27,927); Chadar (18,197)
Panna	1,016,520	207,990	20.46	Chamar (115,549); Kumhar (22,043); Koli (19,684)
Tikamgarh	1,445,166	361,604	25.02	Chamar (220,438); Bansphor (36,682); Kumhar (29,805)
Shahdol	1,066,063	89,733	8.41	Chamar (45,854); Kumhar (12,679); Bansphor (6,451)
Anuppur	749,237	74,385	9.92	Chamar (34,796); Mahar (20,035); Kumhar (9,532)
Umaria	644,758	58,147	9.02	Chamar (25,473); Kumhar (10,526); Koli (3,454)
Ujjain	1,986,864	523,869	26.37	Balai (183,489); Chamar (166,568); Bagdi (93,931)
Dewas	1,563,715	292,007	18.67	Balai (144,480); Chamar (89,631); Bagdi (18,928)
Mandsaur	1,340,411	249,024	18.58	Chamar (89,608); Balai (49,148); Bagdi (30,768)
Neemuch	826,067	111,162	13.46	Chamar (38,594); Meghwal (22,778); Balai (14,230)
Ratlam	1,455,069	198,612	13.65	Chamar (59,108); Balai (52,336); Bagdi (38,048)
Shajapur	1,512,678	353,914	23.39	Balai (132,875); Chamar (127,049); Bagdi (35,384)

=== Religion wise ===
Scheduled Castes		Religion		
Communities	Population	Hinduism	Sikhism	Buddhism
Audhelia	78	78	0	0
Bagri, Bagdi (except for Rajput, Thakur sub-castes)	2,97,861	2,97,809	13	39
Bahna, Bahana	325	316	5	4
Balahi, Balai	13,31,098	13,30,230	573	295
Banchhada	32,624	32,597	1	26
Barahar, Basor	1,02,157	1,02,076	10	71
Bargunda	30,280	30,271	3	6
Bansphor, etc.	3,15,640	3,15,532	24	84
Bedia	26,794	26,784	1	9
Beldar, Sunhar	33,704	33,698	6	2
Bhangi, Mehtar, Balmik, Lalbegi, Dharkor	3,65,769	3,65,344	133	292
Bhanumati	1,788	1,788	0	0
Chadar	1,31,444	1,31,418	8	18
Chamar, Jatav, Ahirwar, etc.	53,68,217	53,38,985	976	28,256
Chidar	36,257	36,250	3	4
Chikwa, Chakwa	3,566	3,565	1	0
Chitar	175	175	0	0
Dahait, Dahayat, Dahat	54,735	54,724	7	4
Dewar	243	243	0	0
Dhanuk	1,05,546	1,05,502	6	38
Dhed, Dher	210	203	0	7
Dhobi	46,575	46,562	3	10
Dohor	38,038	34,325	4	3,709
Dom, etc.	45,728	45,638	6	84
Ganda, Gandi	1,252	1,251	0	1
Ghasi, Ghasia	8,397	8,389	3	5
Holeya	16,192	16,097	4	91
Kanjar	18,216	18,203	5	8
Katia, Pathariya	1,70,672	1,70,555	18	99
Khatik	1,61,026	1,60,972	30	24
Koli, Kori	6,56,569	6,56,170	82	310
Kotwal	15,720	15,720	0	0
Khangar, Kanera, Mirdha	1,77,232	1,77,091	16	125
Kuchbandhia	25,970	25,963	0	7
Kumhar	2,49,794	2,49,742	27	25
Mahar, etc.	8,19,416	6,58,474	320	1,60,622
Mang, Garodi, etc.	29,259	28,944	2	313
Meghwal	81,148	81,102	6	40
Moghia	49,580	49,573	6	1
Muskhan	212	212	0	0
Nat, Kalbelia, Sapera, Kubutar	1,11,465	1,11,364	85	16
Pardhi	26,793	26,744	3	46
Pasi	51,582	51,519	6	57
Rujjhar	1,619	1,619	0	0
Sansi, Sansia	6,731	6,600	131	0
Silawat	53,770	53,745	3	22
Zamral	6,844	6,814	0	30
Sargara	5,662	5,662	0	0
Generic castes, etc.	2,28,347	2,23,364	315	4,668
	11,342,320	11,40,007	2,887	1,99,426
