= Ramnarayan Yadavendu =

Hindi writer

- Born: 1909; Agra, United Provinces, British India
- Died: 1951 (aged 41–42); Agra, Uttar Pradesh, India
- Education: B.A, LLB
- Alma mater: Agra University
- Occupations: Writer, fictionist, social reformer
- Spouse: Savita Devi Yadavendu
- Writing career
- Language: Hindi
- Genres: Hindi literature, Dalit Literature
- Notable works: Yaduvansh Ka Itihas, Bharatiya Sanskriti aur Nagrik Jivan and Rashtra Sangh aur Vishwa Shanti

Ramnarayan Yadavendu (1909–1951) was a Hindi writer, storyteller, essayist and social reformer.

== Personal life ==
Ramnarayan Yadavendu was born into Jatav caste to Dalchand Yadavendu at Agra, Uttar Pradesh. He did his B.A and LLB from Agra university and worked as a contractor. His family was influenced by Arya Samaj and promoted abolition of child marriage, drinking and vegetarianism.

== Career ==
He was close associate of Manik Chand Jatav-vir and was founding member of Jatav Mahasabha. Both of them were instrumental in bringing Dr. B.R.Ambedkar to Agra for Scheduled Caste Conference. He also helped in the establishment of the Jatav Veer Institute.

He also served as Public Officer and Resettlement Officer at Agra in 1945. Later, he became editor of a monthly, 'Vishwamitra' and 'Madhuri'. His book "Yaduvansh Ka Itihas" played a key role in the formation of Jatav Mahasabha.

He was a prolific writer of Premchand's era and his writings include - Nabin Bharatiya Shashan Vidhan, Bharatiya Sanskriti aur Nagrik Jivan, Rashtra Sangh aur Vishwa Shanti, Vishvagyan Bharti, Hitler Ke Vichar, Rajya Vigyan aur Shahdhan, Adarsh Patni, Kala, Sahitya Lochan Ke Siddhant, Adarsh Santan Nigrah and Bharat Ka Dalit Samaj. He was also the member of Sudha literary circle called, Sudha Mandal.
