= Shri Khuralgarh Sahib =

Historical site at Kharali, Punjab

Khuralgarh Sahib
- ਖੁਰਾਲਗੜ ਸਾਹਿਬ
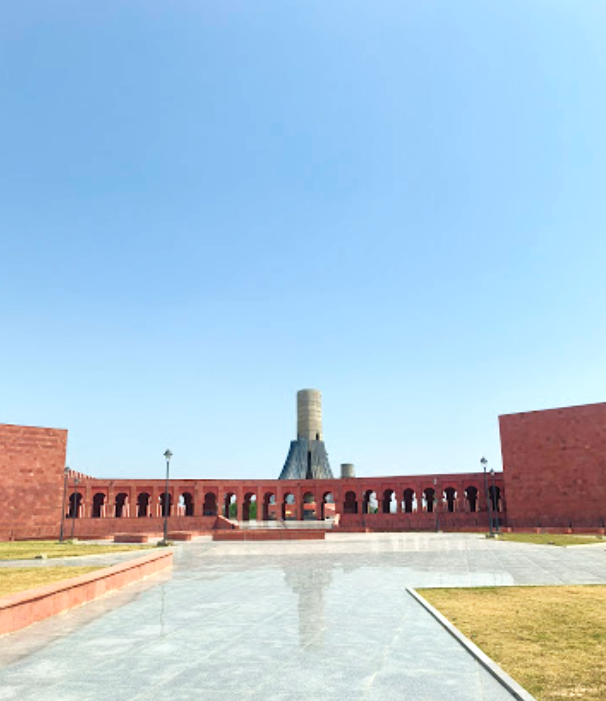
- Minar-e-Begampura, Khuralgarh Sahib

- Location within Punjab Location within India Location within Asia

Religion
- Affiliation: Ad-Dharmi, Sikh Bhagats, Ravidassi, Ramdasia

Location
- Location: Kharali village, Garhshanker, Hoshiarpur district, Punjab, India.
- Coordinates: 31°16′19.84″N 76°18′7.56″E

Architecture
- Style: Sikh architecture

Khuralgarh Sahib (Punjabi: ਖੁਰਾਲਗੜ ਸਾਹਿਬ) is one of the most prominent historical place of Ravidasi communities like Ad-Dharmi, Chamar, Ramdasia Sikhs and Mochis. It is situated at village Kharali, Garhshanker, Hoshiarpur district. Khuralgarh Sahib is also called Charan Choh Ganga Sri Guru Ravidas Ji as this place was visited by Guru Ravidas.

== Religious Significance ==
According to the legends, Guru Ravidass visited Khuralgarh after being persuaded by his disciple Meera Bai to uplift the weaker section of society.

== Minar-e-Begampura ==
Minar-e-Begampura is 151 feet high hallmark of Guru Ravidass Memorial at Shri Khuralgarh Sahib in Khuralgarh village. This memorial is said to have a spacious congregation hall having the capacity to accommodate 10000 pilgrims. Also there is state-of-the art auditorium equipped with all the modern audio-visual aids to showcase the life works of Guru Ravidass and would accommodate nearly 500 pilgrims during any function or event. Guru Ravidass Memorial is built at 14.4 acre of land and is expected to be completed by November 2016.

=== Foundation stone ===
On 3 April 2016, foundation stone of Minar-e-Begampura was laid by the Chief Minister of Punjab.

== See also ==
- Shri Guru Ravidas Gurughar
