= Jatav Mahasabha =

Caste of India

Akhil Bharatiya Jatav Mahasabha
- Abbreviation: ABJM
- Formation: 19 October 1917 (109 years ago)
- Founder: Manik Chand Jatav-vir Khushilal ji Rashtriya Adhayaksh of Akhil Bharatiya = Sunil Kumar Jatav
- Type: Advocacy group
- Headquarters: Agra, Uttar Pradesh
- Region served: India
- Key people: Khemchand Bohare (President)
- Affiliations: Chamar, Ravidassia, Jatav

Akhil Bharatiya Jatav Mahasabha was founded in India in 1917 under the leadership of Manik Chand Jatav and Swami Achootanand. It was formed to promote the interests of Jatia/Jatiya in seeking social upliftment within the Kshatriya varna.

== Foundation ==
Manik Chand Jatav, Ramnarayan Yadavendu, and others came in contact with each other in the 1910s. They worked for the upliftment of jatia/jatiya & freeing caste from this disgraceful name. They campaigned for adopting the 'Jatav' surname, replacing names that denote a lower hierarchy.

The name 'Jatav' came from Pandit Sunderlal Sagar's book Jatav Jivan and Ramnarayan Yadavendu's Yaduvansh Ka Itihas, who were based on their similar heritage and clans of Yadavs and Jats of the Braj region. They demanded the status of Kshatriyas, and economic prosperity made many Jatavs equal to these middle castes. British government established cantonments in Agra, Delhi, Meerut, Kanpur and other prominent cities which gave Jatavs opportunity to prove themselves they got tenders for making leather products for British Indian Army, and many Jatavs got included into army also. This change created an impact on local Jatavs, and they started organizing under one umbrella.

In the 1931 census, they played an aggressive role for their demand as inclusion of Jatavs into the Kshatriya fold and renaming them as 'Jatav' from Charmkar. They succeeded, and jatia/jatiya were called 'Jatav' in the new census of India.

== Activities ==
Jatavs encouraged to leave non-veg and lifestyle as upper castes and even a few of them adopted 'sacred thread' who were earlier under the influence of Arya Samaj.

They established many schools, promoted sanskrit, invested in business, and promoted abnormal women's empowerment.

== Key people ==
- Manik Chand Jatav-vir
- Khemchand Bohare
- Ramnarayan Yadavendu
- Swami Prabhutanand Vyas Abrasion
- Pandit Sundarlal Sagar
- R.P. Deshmukh
- Gopichandra Pipal

== See also ==
- De-Sanskritisation
