= Lehra Sondha =

Lehra Sondha is a modest village located on the National Highway 7 (India) in Bathinda district of Punjab, India. The village's post office is Lehra Dhurkot, and the Tehsil is Nathana. It is situated near the Guru Hargobind Thermal Plant.

The village has a population of approximately 2400, with 1300 eligible voters.

== Economy ==
The primary occupation in the village is agriculture, however, approximately 100+ individuals are employed in government positions. A significant portion of the villagers are also employed at the thermal plant.

== Government ==
Harmail Singh is Sarpanch of the village and he has 7 members for help. This village is in the block of Bhucho M.L.A seat and Bathinda M.P. seat.

== Culture ==
People are connected with Punjabi culture.

=== Religion ===
People are from the Sikh religion, so that's why there are two Gurudwara Sahib and 1 smad of sant kartar Das ji. All castes are sub castes of the Sikh religion like Jatts, Harijans, Ramdasia, and Mehre Sikhs...apart from this Mistri and Raja Sikh.

== Education ==
The village has a limited educational infrastructure, with only a Middle Government School. As a result, children and young adults must travel to the city of Bathinda for higher education opportunities.

== Other facilities ==
There is a Sub Health Centre and MNREGA Centre in the village. The water supply is good, but there is no playground for the young people.
