= Lohar (caste) =

Caste or clan in India and Nepal

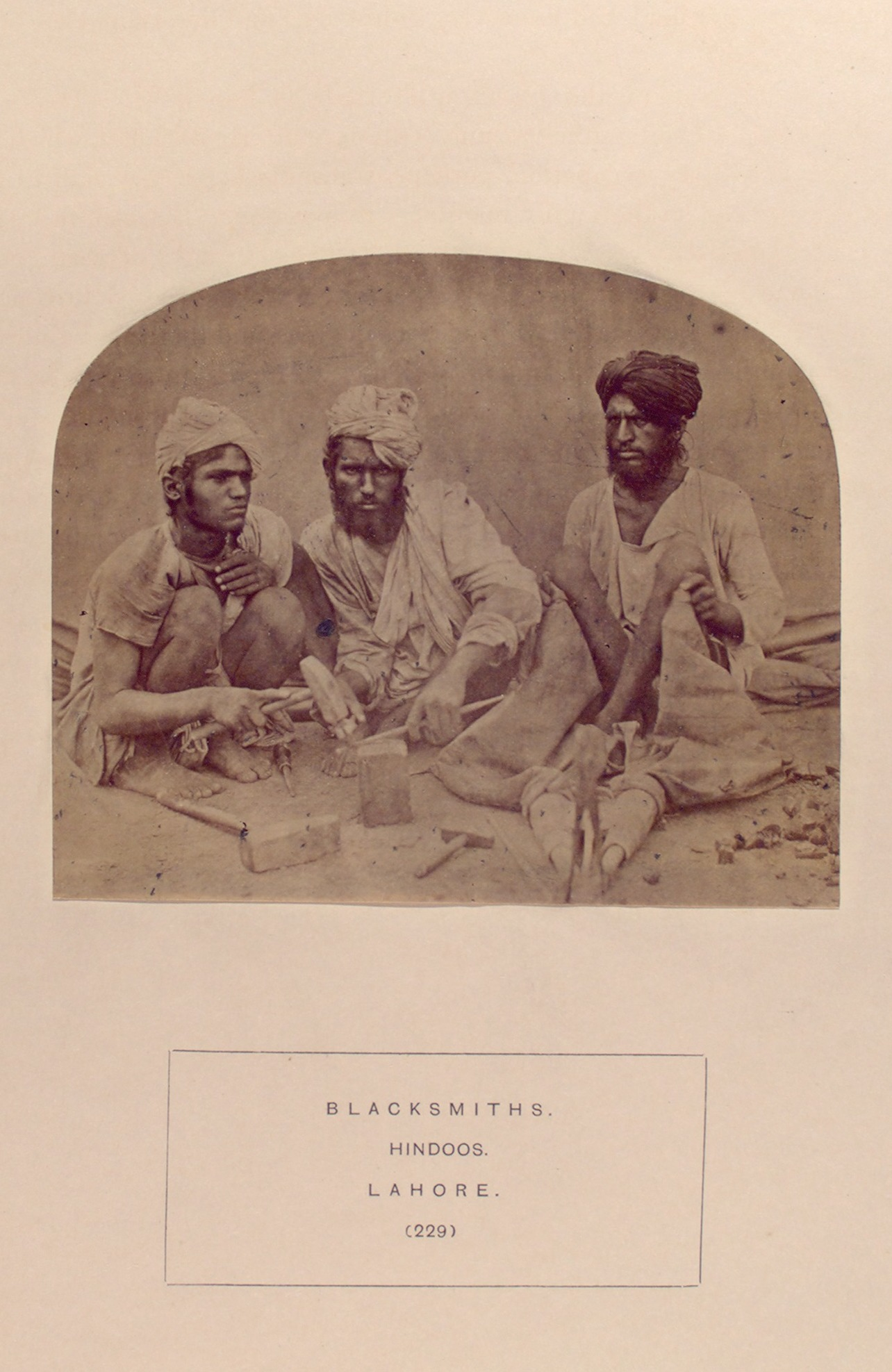
- Religions: Hinduism, Islam, Sikhism
- Languages: Hindi-Urdu, Awadhi, Bhojpuri, Maithili, Nepali, Punjabi, Gujarati
- Country: India, Nepal, Pakistan

Lohar or Lohra is considered to be a caste among Hindus and a clan among Muslims and Sikhs in the Indian states of Uttar Pradesh and Jharkhand, and in Nepal. They form traditionally artisanal castes. Writers of the British Raj period often used the term Lohara as a synonym for blacksmith, although there are other traditional smiting communities, such as the Ramgarhia and Sikligar, and numerous non-traditional communities, including the Kayastha, Rajput and Brahmin.

== Distribution ==
=== Uttar Pradesh ===
Lohara are one of the most widespread communities in Uttar Pradesh. They are divided along religious lines, with Hindu Lohars known as Vishwakarma, Sharma, Panchal and Karmakar. Hindu Lohars are further divided into a number of exogamous groupings, the main ones being the Kanaujiya, Purbia, Bahai, Moulia and Magajia.

Most Lohara are still engaged in their traditional occupation of metal fabrication, although the majority of those in western Uttar Pradesh are cultivators. The assimilated Lohara speak Hindi and its various dialects such as Awadhi; other speak the Ho language.

=== Bihar ===
In Bihar, Lohar caste is considered as distinct from Lohra which comes under schedule tribe. As per a ruling by Supreme Court of India, ‘Lohra or Lohara’, which belongs to the Schedule Tribe (ST) category in several districts and the blacksmith community of Lohars comes under Other Backward Class.

=== Jharkhand ===
Lohars in Jharkhand are locally known as Luhar. They speak regional language such as Hindi. They are classified as OBC in Jharkhand.

== Muslim Lohar ==
Muslim Lohar are divided in two castes Multani Lohar and Deshwal Lohar.

Multani Lohar, Muslim blacksmith community originally from Multan and widely spread all over the World. Mostly found in the state of Gujarat and Western Uttar Pradesh in India.

Deshwal Lohar, or sometimes pronounced Muslim Barhai are Muslim community, found in North India. They are also known as Saifi. which denotes the Muslim sub-caste of blacksmiths and carpenters. A small number are also found in the Terai region of Nepal.

== See also ==
- Kuchband
