= Khemchand Bohare =

Indian activist and social reformer

- Born: 1 January 1875; Shahganj, Agra, North-Western Provinces, British India
- Died: 14 February 1960; Agra, Uttar Pradesh, India
- Occupations: Social Reformer and Founding Member of Jatav Mahasabha
- Years active: 1917-1937

Khemchand Bohare was a Dalit activist and social reformer.

== Personal life ==
Khemchand Bohare was born into the Jatav community to Nannu Shah Bohare in Agra, Uttar Pradesh. He got his education from St. John's College and worked as a contractor on the Great India Peninsula Railway (GIPR) between Bilaspur-Gondia and Nagpur sections.

== Career ==
In 1910, he left his job and started working for the upliftment of the Chamar community. He organised people, i.e., Swami Achootanand, Manikchand Jatav, etc., and founded Jatav Mahasabha to change the identity from Chamar to Jatav. He worked for the upliftment, education, and unity of the untouchables.

In 1918, he was nominated as a member of the Agra Municipal Council and later the District Education Board.

In 1922, he became a member of the United Provinces Legislative Council and remained there until 1937. He also passed a resolution to appoint one member from the depressed classes to be a member of the district boards of municipalities and education in every district.

He also gave testimony in front of the Simon Commission and declared himself Vice President of the All India Depressed Classes Association under Rao Sahib M.C. Rajah.

In the 1937 Indian provincial elections, he fought in the Agra constituency but lost to Manik Chand Jatav.
