= Gunabai Gadekar =

Indian social activist

Gunabai Ramchandra Gadekar (1906–1975) was an Indian social activist, freedom fighter and one of the early women leaders of the depressed classes in 20th century. Under the leadership of Dr. B. R. Ambedkar, she presided over the women council of All India Depressed Classes Association twice in 1930 and 1936.

== Early life ==
Gunabai was born in 1906 in an erstwhile 'untouchable' Chamar family. She started her primary education as a child, but was married at the age of 12. Her husband died the same year and she continued with her education after his death. In 1930, she married Ramchandra Gadekar.

She was one of the earliest women from depressed classes to get formal education and went on to become first female headmaster from the community. She strongly advocated for women education and boarding facilities for women.

Gunabai also worked closely with Harijan Sevak Sangh and contested election as a member of Indian National Congress in 1957. She published her memoir by name Smritigandh (स्मृतिगंध).

She died at the age of 69 in Mumbai.
