= Chetram Jatav =

Indian revolutionary (1827–1857)

- Born: Chetram jatav 19 July 1827; Soro village of Etah district, Uttar Pradesh, British India
- Died: 26 May 1857 (Aged 30)
- Cause of death: Tied to tree and Gun Shot
- Other name: Cheta Ram
- Occupation: Revolutionary
- Organization: Names of the Indian Rebellion of 1857
- Known for: Led initial actions against the British East India Company and Soldiers Killing without weapons
- Movement: Indian Rebellion of 1857
- Status: Executed
- Conviction: Killing
- Penalty: Death

Details
- Victims: British Soldiers

Chetram Jatav (19 July 1827 – 26 May 1857) was an Indian revolutionary who participated in Indian Rebellion of 1857.

He and his compatriot Ballu Mehtar were executed by being tied to a tree and then shot at.

== Early life ==
Chetram Jatav was born on 19 July 1827 in Soro village of Etah district, Uttar Pradesh, into a Chamar family.

== In popular culture ==
The land behind Samta Mulak Chowk in Lucknow was named by the BSP government as Shaheed Chetram Jatav Park.
