= Ramnarayan Rawat =

Indian political scientist and historian

Ramnarayan Rawat (also spelled Ram Narayan Rawat and Ram Rawat) is an Associate Professor of History at the University of Delaware and a historian of the Indian subcontinent and has also had appointments at the University of Pennsylvania (as a postdoctoral scholar) and University of Washington. He received his B.A. and Ph.D. from the University of Delhi. He has conducted research on the Chamar caste in India, and displayed that their work centred on agriculture and not tanning as previously thought. He is the author of the book Reconsidering Untouchability: Chamars and Dalit History in North India and has co-edited the volume Dalit Studies with K. Satyanarayana. He is currently working on his second book entitled Parallel Publics: A History of Indian Democracy.
