= Kharali =

Khurali
- village
- Country: India
- State: Punjab
- District: Hoshiarpur

Government
  - Type: Panchayati raj (India)
  - Body: Gram panchayat

Languages
  - Official: Punjabi
  - Regional: Punjabi
- Time zone: UTC+5:30 (IST)
- Postal code: 144523
- Vehicle registration: PB07

Kharali (sometimes spelled as Khurali or Khuralgarh) is a village located in Garhshanker area of Hoshiarpur district, Punjab, India. The village is known for Shri Khuralgarh Sahib, a place visited by the social reformer and spiritual figure Ravidas.

== Demographics ==
Kharali has a population of 1786 persons (901 males and 885 females) in 343 families. Children population aged 0-6 is 201 which makes up 11.25% of the total population. Average Sex Ratio is 982 higher than Punjab state average of 895. As in 2011 census, literacy rate of the village was 76.53%. 37.79% of total population is Schedule Caste/Dalit at the village.

== See also ==
- Shri Khuralgarh Sahib, religious place in Kharali.
