= Sargara =

Hindu Dalit caste in Western India

Sargara is a Hindu community found in states of Rajasthan, Gujarat and Madhya Pradesh and were engaged in numerous activities, out of which most common was emissary activities. They were earlier considered as Kshatriya who had lose their status in the later medieval period. They were socially and economically backward community in region and are recognized as Scheduled caste in Rajasthan.

They trace their origins to ancient sage, Valmiki and often considered them as Zamindar in the Marwar region. At the time of Independence of India, the majority members of the community were landless workers and bounded labours under the landowners. They follow endogamy and resides in their community villages, which were administrated by the Panchs and are devotess of Lord Hanuman with reverence to Hindu deities such as Chamunda, Ambaji and Ramdev Pir.

As of 2011, their population in Rajasthan was 138,917.
