= Ramdasia =

Dalit caste of India

- Religions: Sikhism • Hinduism • Ravidassia
- Languages: Punjabi • Hindi • Dogri
- Populated states: Punjab • Haryana • Jammu • Himachal Pradesh • Madhya Pradesh

The Ramdasia, also referred to as Ravidassia, were historically a Sikh, Hindu sub-group that originated from the caste of leather worker and shoemakers known as Chamar, and the weaver caste known as Julahas. Sikh historian W. H. McLeod refers to Ramdasia as a Sikh of the Chamar caste in his book named 'The A to Z of Sikhism', and in his other book named 'Punjabis in New Zealand', he traced a Chamar Sikh migrant, an antecedent of Ramdasia.

== Terminology ==
After the partition of India, people from the Chamar community who migrated from West Pakistan started referring to themselves as Sikh Ramdasias. The origin of the term Ramdasia was the corruption of the word Ravidasias. Those migrants regard Ramdas or Ravidas as the preceptor of their community. Ravidassia and Ramdasia are terms used in general for Sikhs whose ancestors belonged to the Chamar and Julaha castes. Both the words Ramdasia and Ravidasia are also used inter-changeably while these also have regional context. The word Ramdasia is largely used in Puadh and Malwa, while Ravidasia is predominantly used in Doaba. According to Sewa Singh Kalsi, the term Ramdasia referred to Julaha Sikhs whilst the terms Ad-Dharmi and Ravidasi referred to Chamar Sikhs. There are also other terms used to describe Chamars, such as Harijan (meaning "people of God") and Achhut (literally meaning "untouchable", with this term being considered offensive). The word chamar derives from the Sanskrit word charam-kara, meaning "leather-worker". The word Ad-Dharmi derives from the word ad meaning "original" and dharm meaning "religion", and is considered a more respectable title to refer to Chamars. Another more respectful term to refer to Chamar Sikhs is Mihtar. The Julaha Sikhs were also known by the term Khalsa-biradar (meaning "brother of the Khalsa") but they dislike being referred to as either Ramdasia or Khalsa-biradar, preferring to be referred to as just Sikhs. According to K. S. Singh, the term Ramdasi refers to Sikh Chamars whilst Raidasi/Rabdasi refers to Hindu Chamars. Related terms are Jatia, Golia, and Raigar.

== History ==
The Chamars were traditionally leather workers and landless labourers whilst the Julaha were weavers. However, both the Chamars and Julaha traditionally inhabited the same space in a Punjabi village and shared common gots (clans), showcasing affinities between the two groups. In Indian history, the Chamars were responsible for creating weaponry, armour, and footwear, working with hides and skins of animals. Due to their occupation involving material from animal carcasses, they became seen as ritually impure (a concept known as chhut-chat) and became stigmatized. Thus, they had their own colonies separate from the settlements, known as chamardlis, which had their own wells and crematorium. In rural Punjab, they worked the servile/menial role (sepidar) in the jajmani system, with them supplying shoes, leather whips, leather well-buckets, and other items to their patrons (jajmans) in-return for token payments. Whilst some also helped with farming, this was typically only during peak-season or during aur (sugarcane) production. Chamar Sikhs are known by the term Ravidasis.

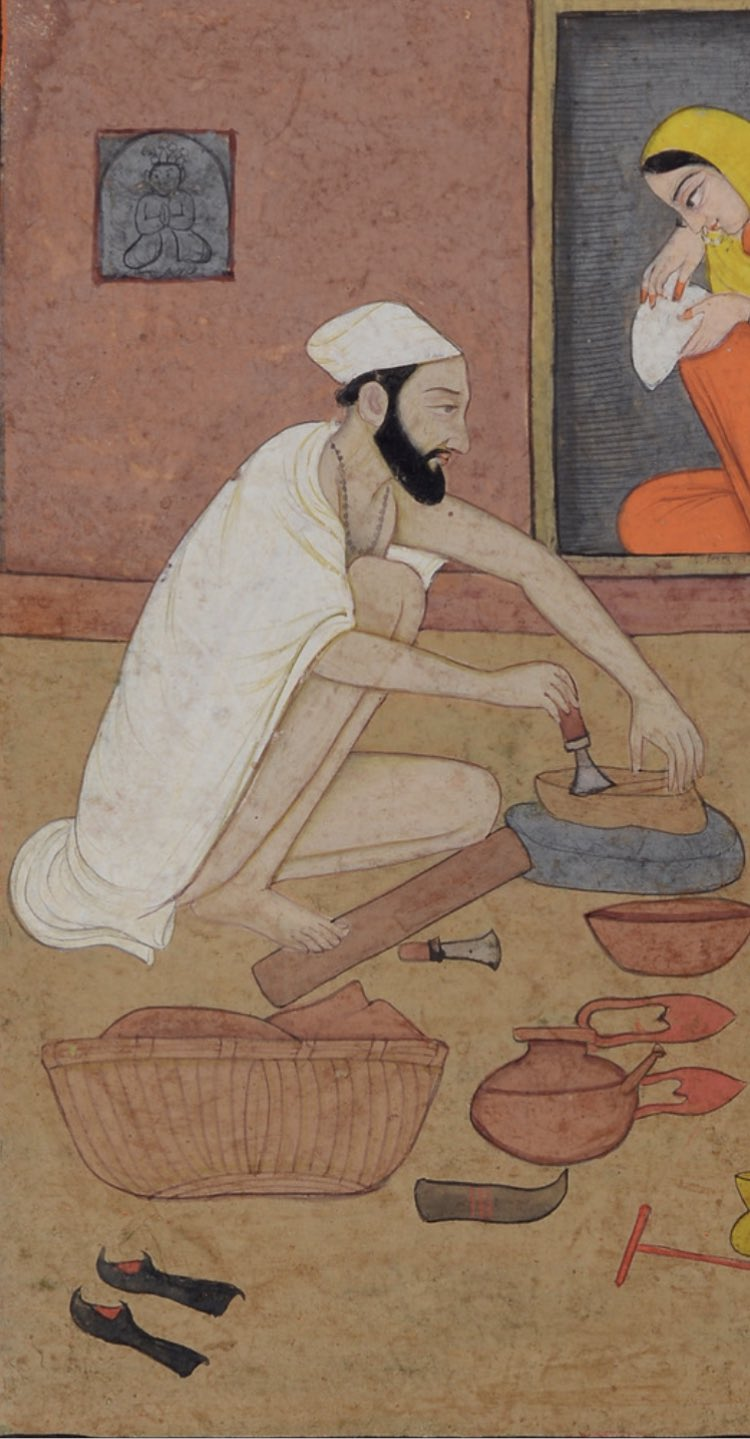
Detail of Ravidas from a painting of Ravidas the shoemaker meeting a Brahmin, with his wife in the doorway, ca.1780

Originally they were followers of Ravidass, who belonged to Chamar community. The Chamars identify Ravidas as one of their own, and some of his compositions were included in the Guru Granth Sahib when the scripture was compiled by the Sikh gurus. Ravidas taught about the concept of begumpura, a hypothesized casteless society, and stressed his pride in his Chamar identity. In his teachings, he also emphasized on kirt (work) and not relying on dan (offerings). In his effort to go against the caste system, Ravidas wore the janau and tilak, which were traditionally adorned by Brahmins. Thus, the Ravidasis are influenced by both the Sikh tradition and the Bhakti movement. However, their beliefs and practices in rural Punjab were syncretic, with them revering Ravidas, the Sikh gurus, and Hindu deities.

During the British colonial-period, they were recruited into the British Indian Army, especially during the Sepoy revolt of 1857 and the World Wars. The establishment of a cantonment in Jalandhar in the second half of the 19th century by the British led to increased prosperity of the Chamars of the Doaba region as they found work supplying leather for military boots. Mangu Ram, a Dalit activist, was the son of one of these workers. The Doaba region saw a weakening of the jajmani system.

Dera Sachkhand Ballan was founded in the late-19th century by Pipal Das. Later leaders were Ramanand Das (assassinated in 2009) and Niranjan Das.

In the 1925, the Ad-Dharmi movement launched by the Chamars under the leadership of Mangu Ram, which advocated for greater caste-equality and better rights for the lower-castes. The movement named the historical saints Valmiki, Ravidas, Kabir, and Namdev, as their religious figures. Furthermore, they completely rejected the caste-system as they believed the Divine prevailed everywhere in the world, including within lower-castes. In-order to emphasize their distinct religious identity, the Ad-Dharmis adopted three symbols: wearing red clothing, the phrase soham ("I am it", referring to Vedantic concept of the primacy of the soul), and the salutation Jai Guru Dev ("victory to the great God"). In 1936, Ambedkar expressed an interest in becoming a Sikh and dispatched his son Jaswant Rao and fifteen Mahars to Amritsar to inquire further. However, negotiations between them and the Sikh leaders failed due to the issue of roti-beti di sanih (no restrictions on commensality and intercaste marriages). In the second half of the 20th century, the jajmani system withered away in Punjab, with this decline being greatest in the Doaba region, with Chamars moving out of agricultural work to alternative sectors of the economy, leading to greater autonomy with regards to their culture and economics, and increasing their political influence. The former, local Chamar agricultural workers have been replaced by migrant farm workers from the Indian states of Uttar Pradesh and Bihar.

Many Ravidasis became associated with the Nirankari Mandal and the Radha Soamis. Sant Sarwan Das was a Chamar who became the custodian of the Ravidas Dera of Ballan. He promoted education, supported the Chamar community, and was a preacher of gurbani who spread the teachings of both Guru Nanak and Ravidas. In Calcutta, he constructed the Guru Ravidas Dera. His death anniversary is celebrated by the Ravidasi Sikhs on 11 June. He is symbolized as representing the three traditions of the Sant movement, Hinduism, and Sikhism. Thus, he continues to be revered by some Ravidasi Sikhs even after his death.

The Ravidasis have developed a more autonomous religious identity from both Sikhism and Hinduism, with this being characterized by the worship practices, the names, constitution, and interior decorations of their gurdwara (being decorated with images of Ravidas), their nishan sahib (flag), and their personal-names. Over time, Chamars from around India have joined the Raidasi sect centered around Ravidas.

== Status and religious beliefs ==
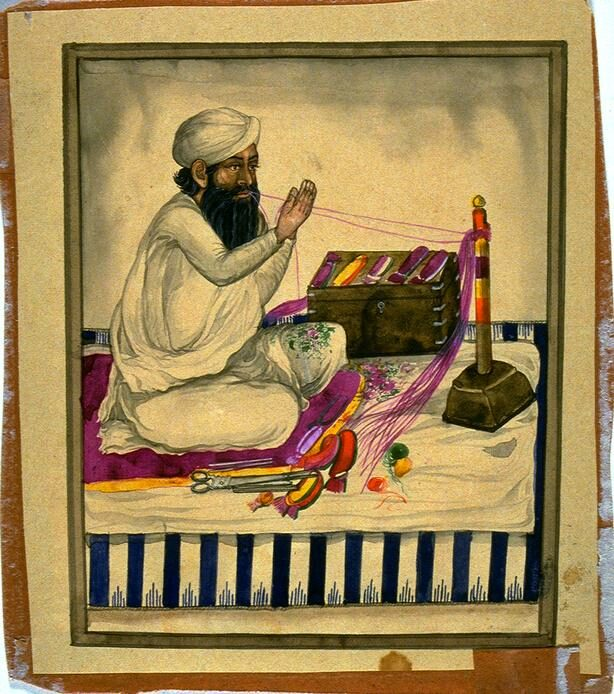
Painting of a man twisting thread, attributed to Kehar Singh, ca.1880

There are two main groups of Dalit Sikhs, the Mazhabis/Rangretas (originate from Chuhras) and Ramdasias/Ravidassias (originate from Chamars). These two groups are not seen as equals, with the Chamar-derived group seeing themselves as superior to the Chuhra-derived group in the caste-hierarchy. In Punjab, the houses of Julaha Sikhs are often situated near Chamar colonies known as chamardlis. Thus, the Julahas and Chamars share a bond with one another and similar origins. Julahas are seen as being higher-ranked on the caste-hierarchy than Chamar and Chuhra (Mazhabi) Sikhs.

In the Sikh diaspora, Sikh Chamars still face discrimination from Jat Sikhs, who have not shed the traditional caste-hierarchy from the subcontinent, with the origin of Chamar Sikhs being used as an insult against them or them being discriminated at Sikh gurdwaras. Jat Sikhs focused on their Chamar identity rather than seeing them as fellow Sikhs, with them discriminating them during the preparation and distribution of langar (communal kitchen) and parshad (ritual food), and in the diwans high-caste (bare-log) Sikh women would tell Chamar Sikh women to sit away from them. Due to this discrimination faced by Chamar Sikhs in the diaspora, they started establishing their own organizations, often known as Ravidas Sabhas, and places of worship, known as Bhawans, to avoid feeling stigmatized, and a motion towards establishing a separate Ravidasi identity. They also celebrated the birthday of Ravidas as a gurpurab. Their nishan sahib differs from the mainstream Sikh one, as the khanda symbol is replaced with the word soham, which was one of the symbolic phrases of the earlier Ad-Dharmi movement. Additionally, they raise their nishan sahib on Ravidas' gurpurab rather than on the day of Vaisakhi like other Sikhs. Their ardas also emphasizes their dual Ravidasi and Sikh identities, adding the name of Ravidas after Guru Nanak in the prayer. Aside from Ravidas, other figures revered by them are Sant Sarwan Das and Ambedkar. Chamar Sikhs were more likely to be clean-shaven, not wear turbams and bear Hindu-inflected names, as they believe that stressing upon keeping Sikh articles of faith is gatekeeping by higher-caste Sikhs. Ravidasi gurdwaras for the most part resemble other Sikh gurdwaras, however there is much more focus on Ravidas in their daily functions due to them seeing Ravidas as a guru, a view not shared by other Sikhs, who rather view Ravidas as a sant, bhagat, or baba. They reject the naam karan ceremony for naming a child and do not host amrit sanchars at their gurdwaras, believing these to be ritualistic. The Chamar Sikhs do not subscribe to the S.G.P.C.-issued Sikh Rehat Maryada, as it is viewed as Jat-biased and narrow-minded. Thus, the Chamar Sikhs prefer to be known as sehajdharis. According to Sewa Singh Kalsi, the emergence of Ravidasi gurdwaras is a process of a low-caste group attempting to reframe its identity using the framework of the sant tradition.

The Chamar Sikhs have many gots (clans), some of whose names may overlap with the clans of other Sikh caste-groups. There is also the four-got rule, which prohibits one marrying someone belonging to the same got as their father, mother, paternal grandmother, and maternal grandmother.

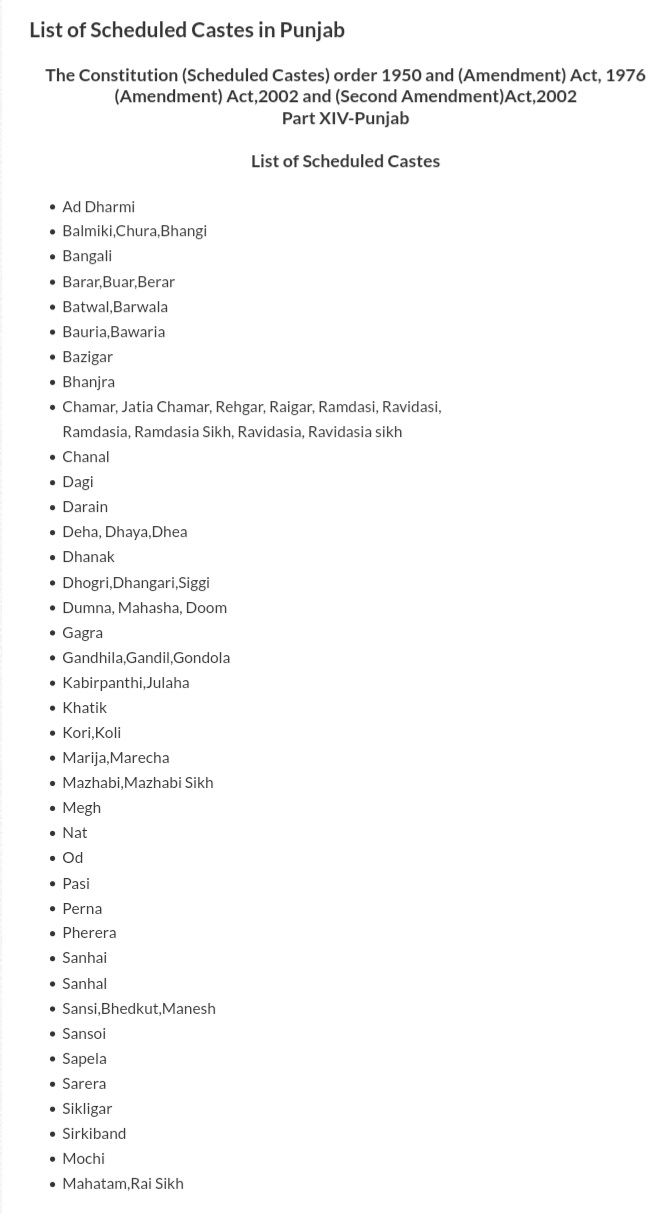
List of Scheduled Castes in Punjab

Ramdasia Sikhs are enlisted as scheduled caste by Department of Social justice, Empowerment and Minorities- Government of Punjab. On Department's list of Scheduled Caste, this caste is listed on serial number 9 along with other Chamar caste synonymous such as Ravidasia, Jatav and so on.

== Military service ==
=== British Raj ===
During World War I the single-battalion regiments of the Mazhabi and Ramdasia Sikh Pioneers – the 23rd, 32nd and 34th Pioneer Regiments – were expanded to comprise three battalions each. These units served in Egypt, Europe, Mesopotamia and Palestine and performed well. The 1/34th Sikh Pioneers were awarded the title of "Royal".

The Ramdasia Sikhs, together with the Majhabi Sikhs, were recruited to the Sikh Light Infantry regiment (SLI) after its formation in 1941. The Sikh Light Infantry has always been a "single class" regiment in the parlance adopted from the British Raj era. This means that it recruits only from one demographic, which in this instance means the Ramdasia Sikhs and Mazhabi Sikhs. Indeed, the SLI was initially called the Mazhabi & Ramdasia Sikh Regiment. Despite unwillingness among some policy makers, the British had to abandon their traditional distinction between martial and non-martial races during the Second World War. This was necessitated by the need for more recruits than could be supplied by those communities upon which they usually relied, such as the Jat Sikhs, Dogras and Punjabi Musalmans. In addition, indiscipline among Jat Sikhs caused by their concerns regarding a post-war division of India was another reason to prefer recruitment of new classes. While recruitment from the pre-war martial classes was still pre-eminent, that from newly recognised classes such as the Ramdasias and Mazhabis became significant.

=== Post-independence ===
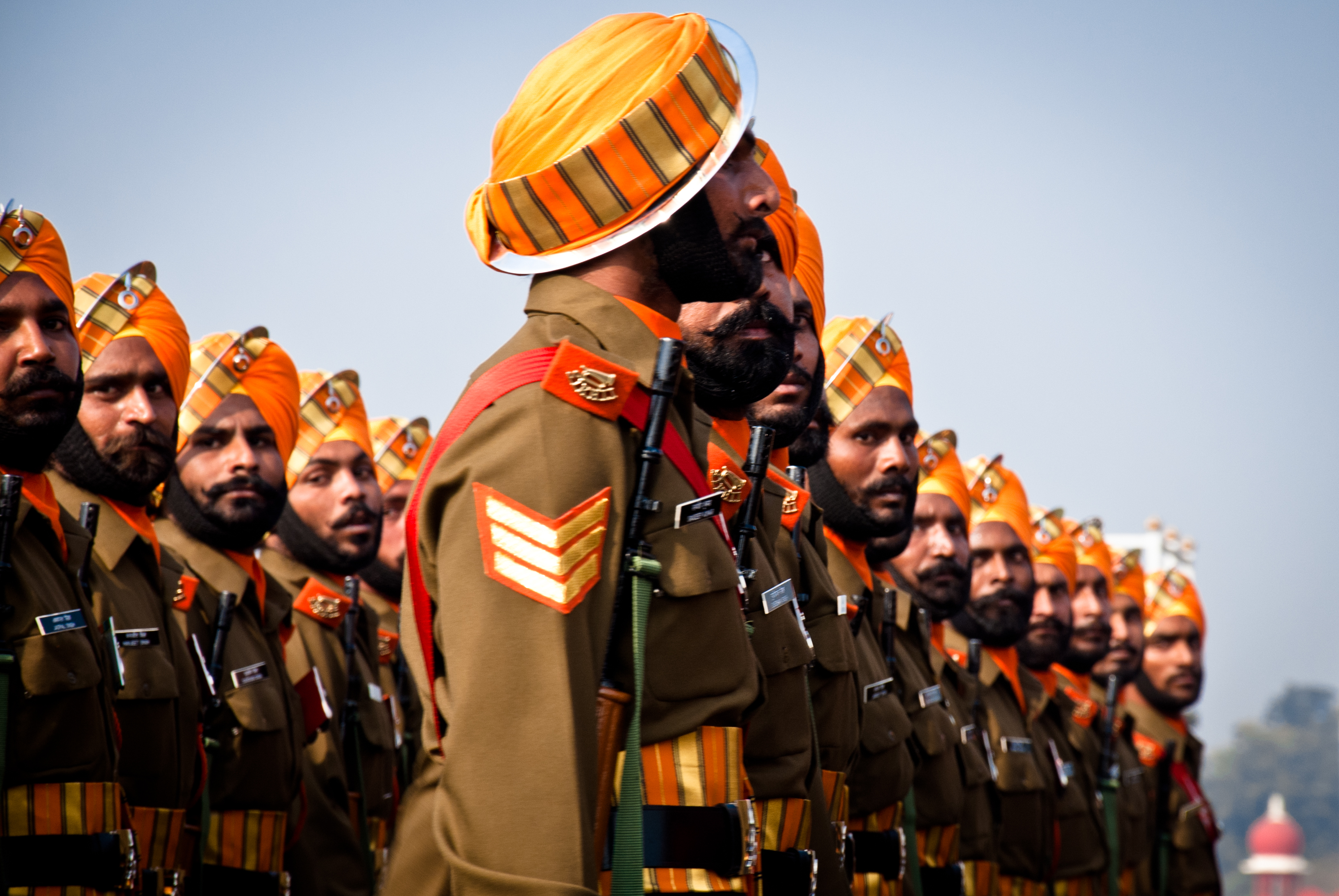
The Sikh Light Infantry march past during the Republic day parade in New Delhi, India.

When India became independent in 1947, the British Indian Army became the Indian Army. This, like its predecessor, relies on the martial race theory for much of its recruitment and thus there is a grossly disproportionate number of Sikhs within its ranks. The Ramdasias Sikhs and Mazhabi Sikhs continued their service with the SLI in the new army. The SLI has served in almost all of the post-1947 conflicts involving India, including the wars with Pakistan in 1947, 1965 and 1971, the Hyderabad Police Action of 1948 and the Chinese aggression in 1962. It has also served in Sri Lanka, where the 1st, 7th, 13th and 14th Battalions have contributed towards peace-keeping.

== Hindu Ramdasia ==
This sect of Ramdasia having faith in Hinduism and they mostly residing in Pathankot, Jammu, Himachal Pradesh and Jalandhar. Hindu Ramdasia migrated from Pakistan and back in Sialkot, these Ramdasia were involved in Leather/Sports Goods Business. After migrating in Jalandhar they established their own Tanneries and Sports Goods manufacturing Units. For This purpose Government of Punjab, India helped them by providing liberal loans and allotting sites for their Factories Hindu Ramdasia's are staunch follower of Guru Ravidass and they follow Dera Swami Gurdeep Giri ji, Pathankot. According to Department of Social Justice and Empowerment, Government of India Ramdasias are listed as Chamar Caste on serial number 4 and 14 for Jammu and Kashmir and Himachal Pradesh respectively.

== Demographics ==
As of 2011 Census, there were 3,095,324 Chamars in the Indian state of Punjab, of whom 1,017,192 declared themselves as Ad-Dharmi Chamar and 2,078,132 declared themselves as Ramdasia/Ravidasia Chamar. According to this Census, during the same year the population of Sikh Ramdasia/Ravidasia and Hindu Ramdasia/Ravidasia in Punjab was 1,443,079 and 629,157 respectively.

Most of the Hindu Ramdasias (Counted along with other Chamar Caste Synonyms such as Ravidasia and Jatav) living in the Jammu and Kashmir, Himachal Pradesh and Haryana. As of 2011, there were 212,032 Ramdasia in Jammu and Kashmir, comprising 209,512 Hindus, 2,486 Sikhs and 34 Buddhists, 2,429,137 lived in Haryana (2,390,403 Hindu, 37,191 Sikh and 1,543 Buddhists) and 458,838 resided in Himachal Pradesh (453,871 Hindu, 4,887 Sikh and 80 Buddhists)

== Ramdasia diaspora and religious buildings ==
Ramdasia Sikh diaspora alongside Ravidassia from doaba emigrated from India and Pakistan is significant. Emigration from the Punjab began before and after the 19th century, with many Ravidasia/Ramdasia Sikhs settling in Europe, and also a large Ravidasia/Ramdasia Sikhs population in North America mainly in United States and the Canada. There is sizeable population of Ravidasia/Ramdasia Sikhs in Oceania as well.

=== Fiji ===
- Guru Ravidass Gurdwara (Nasinu Sikh Temple), Nasinu (Established in 1939)

=== New Zealand ===
- Guru Ravidass Sikh Temple, Bombay Hills, Auckland (Established in 1991)
- Guru Ravidas Temple, Hastings (Established in 2007)
- Gurdwara Begampura Sikh Temple, Papakura (Established in 2008)

=== Australia ===
- Guru Ravidas Gurdwara, Campbellfield, Melbourne (Established in 1996)

=== England ===
- Shri Guru Ravidas Bhavan, Birmingham
- Shri Guru Ravidass Temple, Southall
- Shri Guru Ravidass Community Centre, Handsworth
- Shri Guru Ravidass Temple, Wolverhampton
- Shri Guru Ravidass Community Centre, Wolverhampton
- Shri Guru Ravidas Temple - Coventry
- Shri Guru Ravidass Community Centre, Coventry
- Shri Guru Ravidass Temple, Hockley
- Shri Guru Ravidas Temple - Foleshill
- Shri Guru Ravidass Temple, Rebecca Street, Bradford
- Gurdwara Shri Guru Ravidass Maharaj Ji, Thornbury Street, Bradford
- Shri Guru Ravidass Gurdwara - Bedford
- Shri Guru Ravidass Temple - Darlaston
- Guru Ravidass Sabha Community Centre, Derby
- Shri Guru Ravidass Sikh Temple - Derby
- Shri Guru Ravidass Sikh Temple, Leicester
- Shri Guru Ravidass Temple - Willenhall
- Shri Guru Ravidass Temple - Walsall
- Shri Guru Ravidass Gurdwara - Erith Kent
- Shri Guru Ravidass Gurdwara and Community Centre- Hitchin
- Shri Guru Ravidass Gurdwara- Newham, London
- Guru Ravidass Sabha, Northampton
- Dera Baba Gobind Dass, Guru Ravidass Sabha, Bilston
- Shri Guru Ravidass Gurdwara - Gravesend
- Shri Guru Ravi Dass Sabha - Letchworth
- Shri Guru Ravidass Bhavan - Luton
- Shri Guru Ravidass Gurdwara- Strood, Medway
- Shri Guru Ravidass Gurdwara - Southampton
- Shri Guru Ravidass Temple, Glasgow
- Shri Guru Ravidass Mission Temple, London

=== United States ===
- Guru Ravidass Sikh Temple, Pittsburg, California
- Guru Ravidass Sikh Temple, Fresno
- Guru Ravidass Sikh Temple, Rio linda
- Guru Ravidass Sikh Temple, Union City
- Guru Ravidass Sikh Temple, Yuba City
- Guru Ravidass Gurdwara, Selma
- Guru Ravidass Sikh Temple, Houston
- Guru Ravidass Sikh Temple, New York
- Guru Ravidass Sabha, DFW, Texas

=== Canada ===
- Guru Ravidass Gurdwara, Burlington
- Guru Ravidass Sabha, Brampton
- Guru Ravidas Temple, Ariss, Toronto
- Guru Ravidass Sikh Temple, Montreal
- Guru Ravidass Sabha, Edmonton
- Guru Ravidass Sikh Temple, Vancouver
- Guru Ravidass Gurdwara and Community Centre, Calgary

== Gallery ==
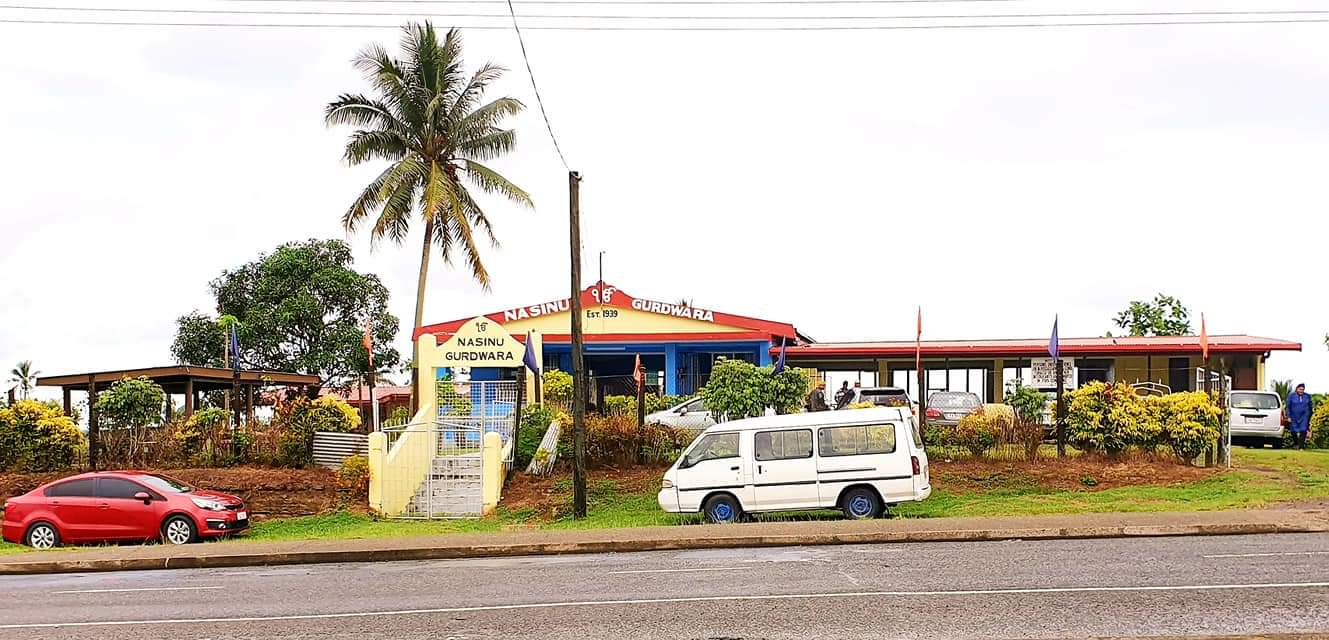
Gurdwara Guru Ravidass, Nasinu, Fiji Established in 1939

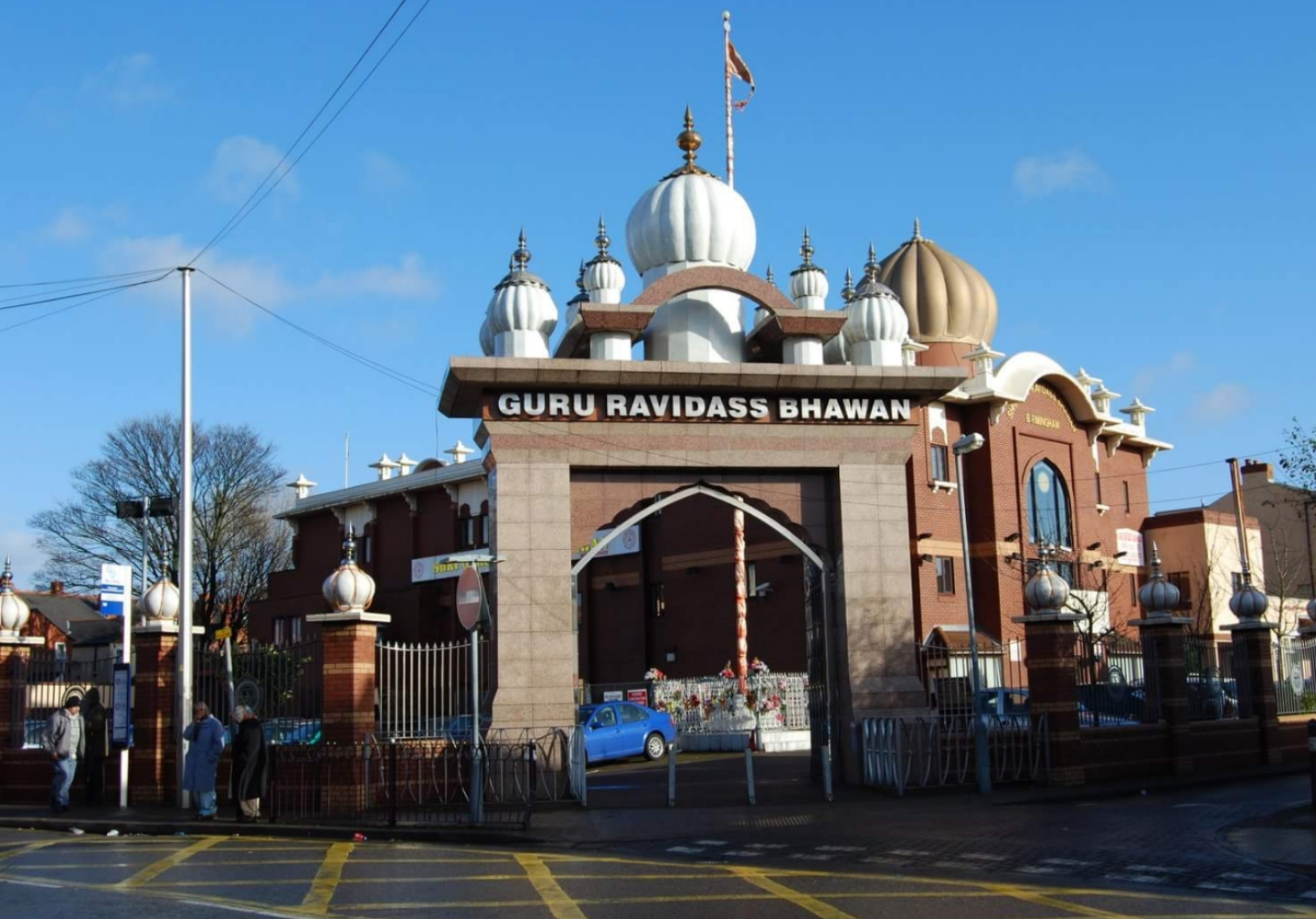
Gurdwara Guru Ravidass Bhavan, Birmingham

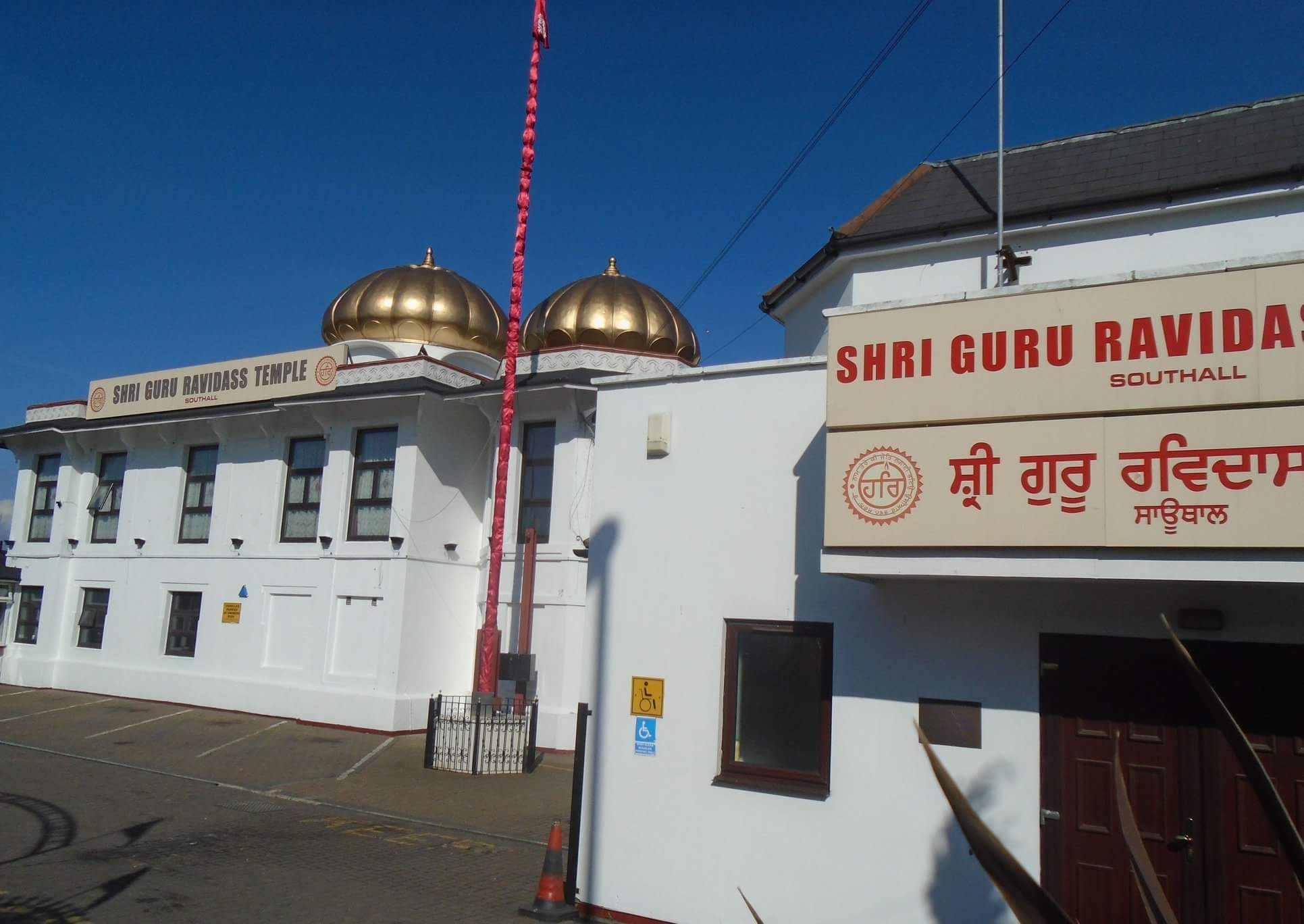
Gurdwara Guru Ravidass Sabha, Southall

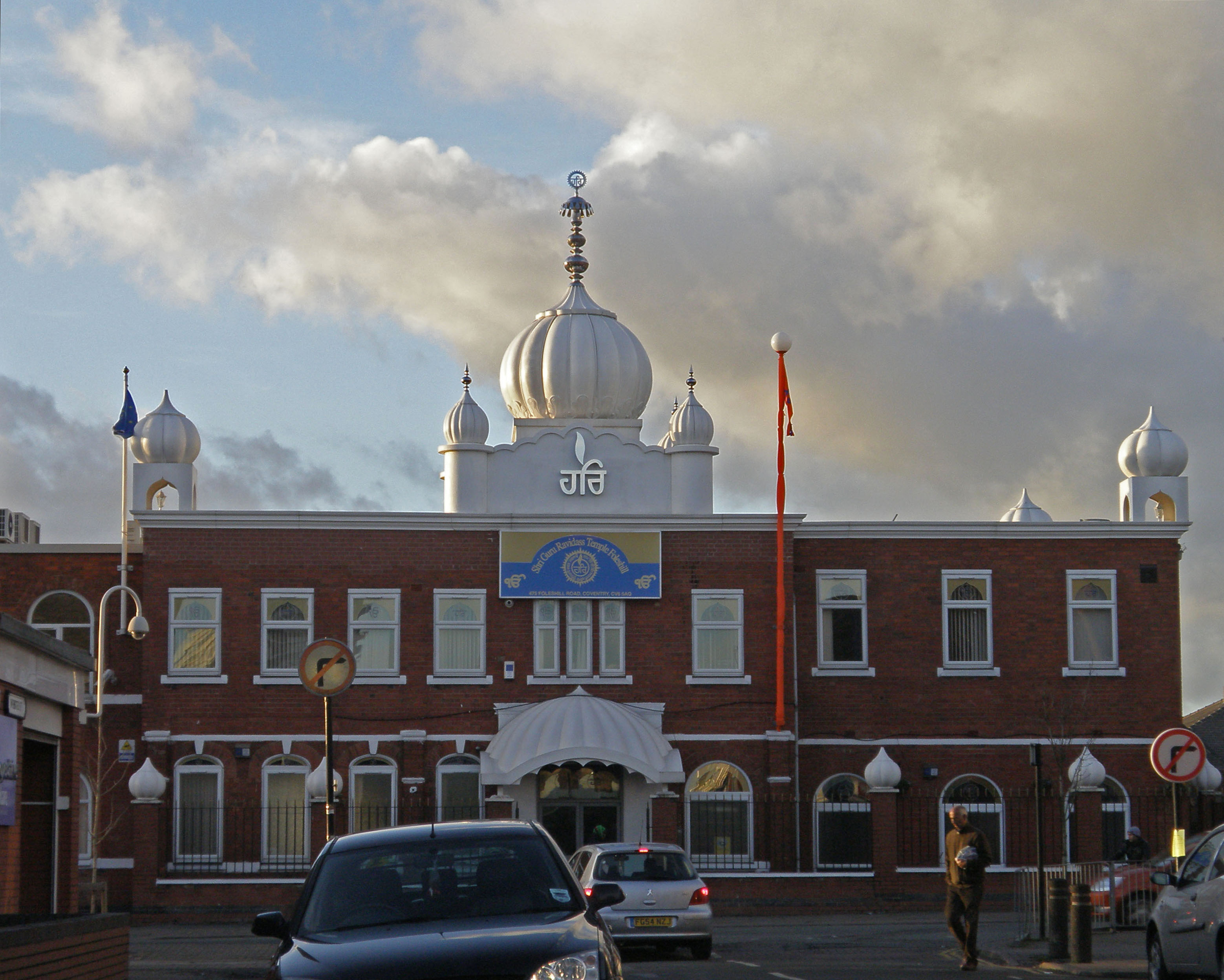
Shri Guru Ravidass Temple in the UK

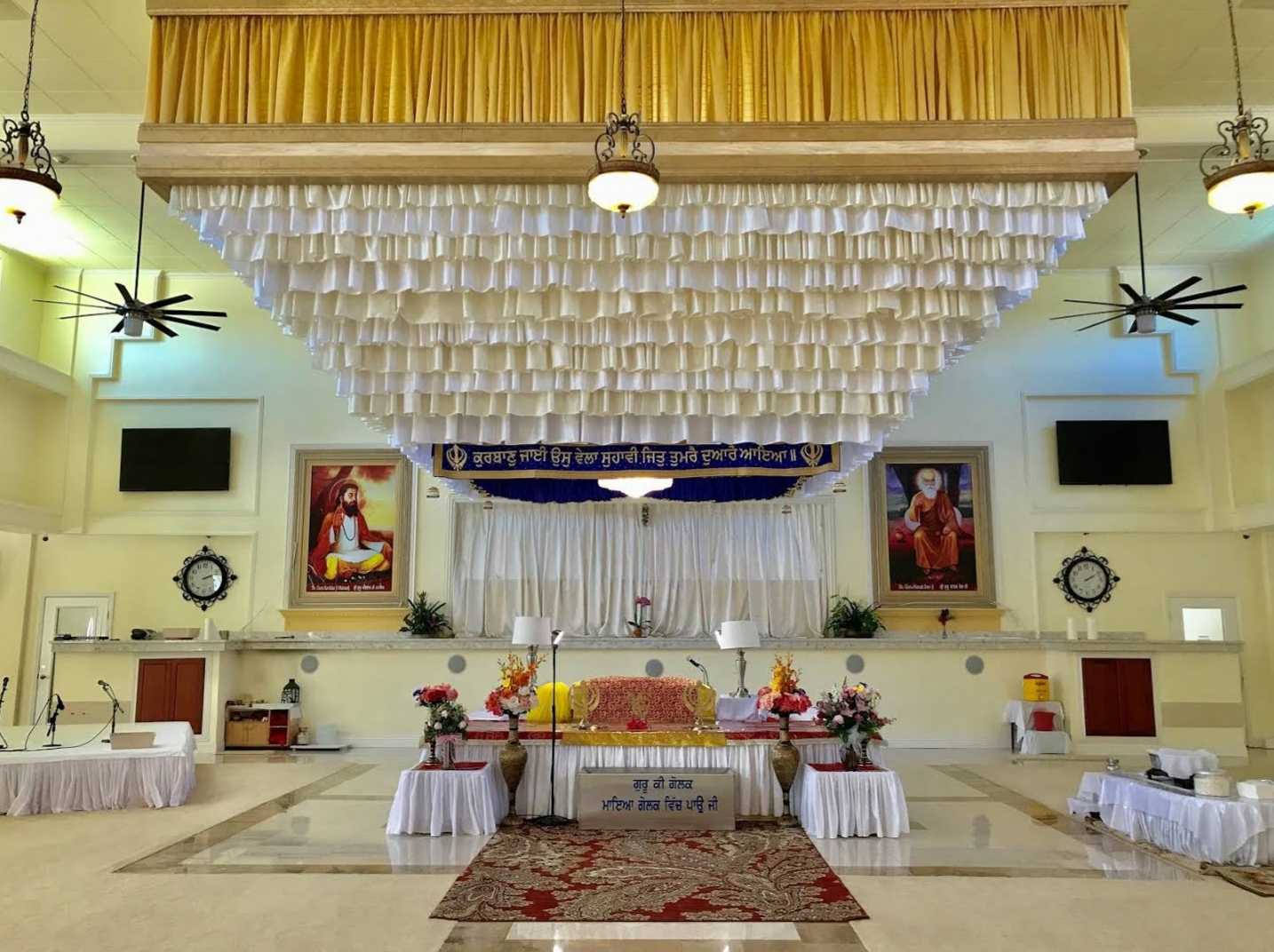
Gurdwara Guru Ravidass Temple, Pittsburg, California

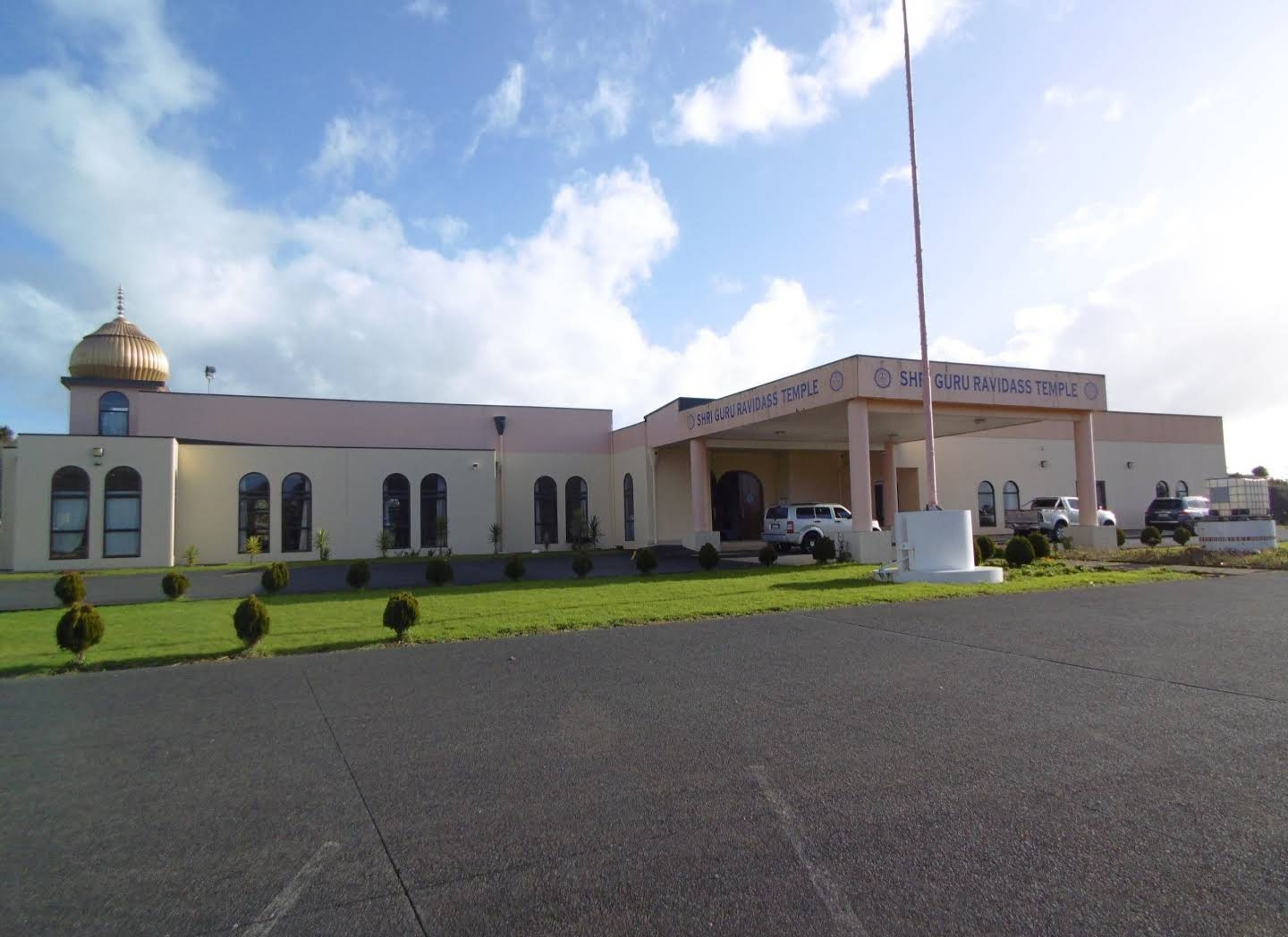
Gurdwara Guru Ravidass Temple, Auckland

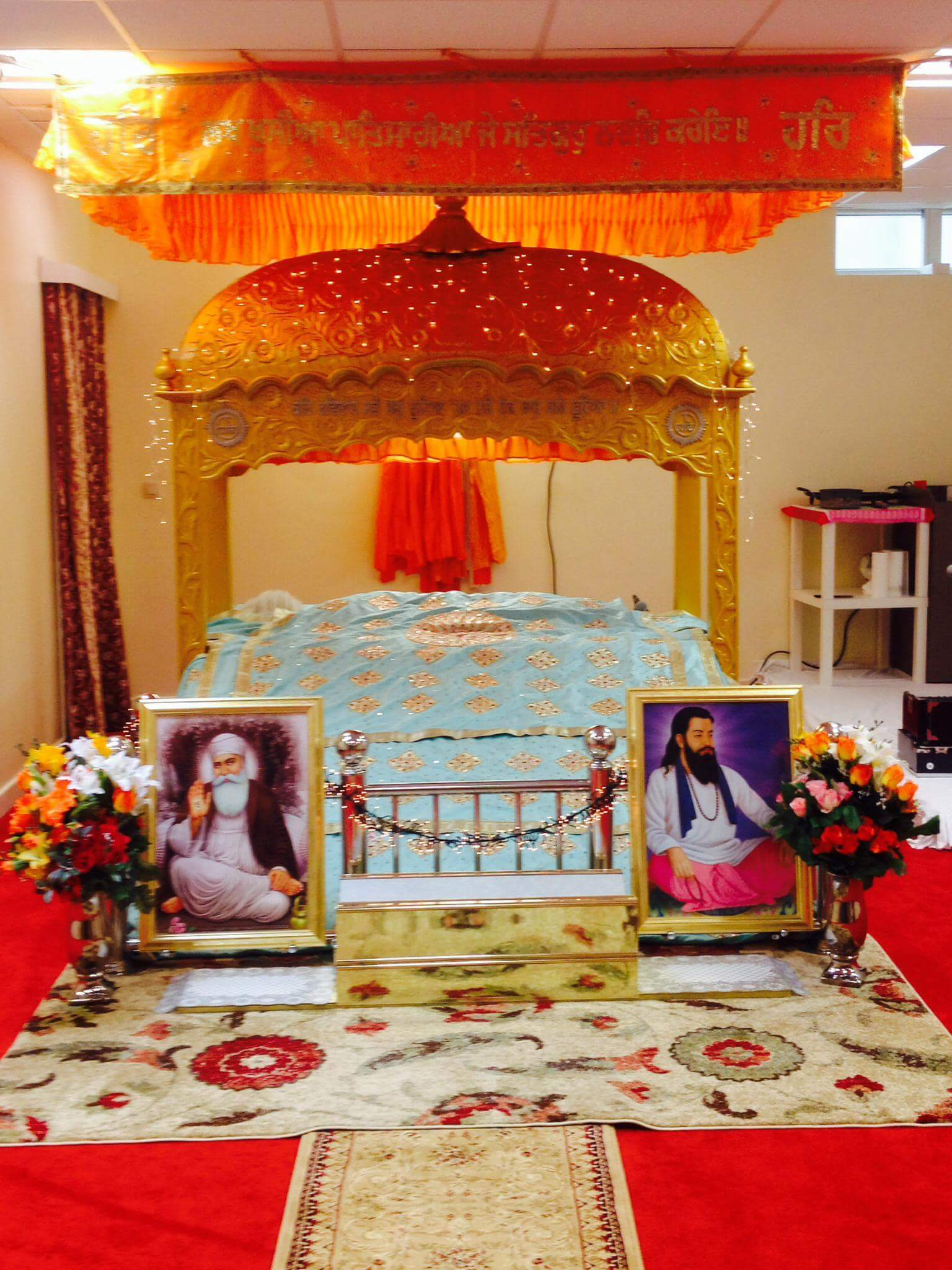
Gurdwara Guru Ravidass Sabha, Oostende

== See also ==
- Ravidasia
- Chamar
- Julaha
- Kabirpanthi Julaha
- Sikh Light Infantry
- Jatav
- Sikhism
- Ad-Dharmi
- Ahirwar
- Chambhar
- Ravived
