= Dewar (caste) =

Scheduled caste of India

The Dewar (Dhibara) are a scheduled caste from the Indian states of Chhattisgarh, Odisha and Madhya Pradesh. They are fishing communities, who are often clubbed with Jalia Kaibarta and counted with Keuta and Kaibarta in Odisha.

== Subgroups ==
They are said to be the following:

- Keuta (Kaibartha)
- Nialis
- Rarhis
- Machhua
- Siuli
- Kedar
- Gunduri
- Girigiria
- Malha
- Nauri
