= Ahirwar =

Dalit caste

Dalit

Regions with significant populations
- • India • Nepal

Languages
- • Hindi • Khari boli •Bundeli

Religion
- • Hinduism and Buddhism

The Ahirwar, or Aharwar are Dalit members of a north Indian caste categorised among the Scheduled Castes of Chamar. Predominantly they are members of the Scheduled Castes with a higher population in Uttar Pradesh, Madhya Pradesh.

They are present, for example, in the state of Madhya Pradesh. The 2001 Census of India recorded them in the Bundelkhand area and as the largest caste group in Lalitpur district, Uttar Pradesh, with a total population 138,167.

== Notable Ahirwar ==
- Nathu Ram Ahirwar - Indian politician, social leader, former education minister, and educationist
- Dinesh Ahirwar - Indian politician
- Narayan Das Ahirwar - Indian politician

== See also ==
- Jatav
- Ravidassia
- Ramdasia
