= Ganda (caste) =

Caste in the Indian states of Odisha and Chhattisgarh

The Ganda or Gandawa are an indigenous community from the eastern Indian states of Odisha and Chhattisgarh. They live mainly in western Odisha and adjoining parts of Chhattisgarh, especially in Bolangir and Bargarh districts. They are divided into various endogamous divisions such as Odia, Laria, Kandria/Kandharia, Kabria and Saharia Ganda, which are further divided into a number of totemistic exogamous clans (bansa) like bagh, sika, nag, and podha. They practise adult marriage and are mainly monogamous. Marriages are usually arranged through negotiation, while mutual consent is also respected. Junior levirate, junior sororate, remarriage of widows, widowers, and divorcees are permitted. They follow the puberty function and have birth pollution. Pre-delivery and post natal rituals such as chatti, naming ceremony, and tonsure are also performed. They practise both cremation and burial to dispose of their dead. Their traditional occupations includes weavers, village watchmen and village headmen. They also play drums during special occasions. Their principle deity is Dulha Deo.

== Ganda Baja ==
The Gandas are best known for their special music known as Ganda Baja, which is essential for village functions throughout western Odisha. The music uses drums (dhol, nissan, tasa or timkiri), pipes (mohuri) and cymbals (kastal). Previously Gandas would be patronized by important rajas or zamindars and would be essential parts of their festivities, while today they are patronized by members of other castes to play at their festivals.The music of the Gandas is considered important to communicate with local gramadevatas. On every Monday in Bora Sambar, a region of Bargarh, the priest performs the boil ritual, where the goddess possesses the priest and puts him into a trance. During this time, the Gandas play their instruments to sulo par, 16 rhythms, representing the 16 goddesses. It is said only the Ganda Baja instruments allow this boil to occur, and the playing of the instruments by the Gandas helps the goddess focus her shakti on the priest, who could lose control due to the sheer strength of her power. During this ritual, the priest can heal people who are suffering ailments such as barrenness due to the shakti he channels, thanks to the Ganda orchestra. When Mahinda (son of King Ashoka) went to Sri Lanka, he took Ganda baja and gandas with him. Both traditional baja are similar as per Buddhist scripture.
