= Manik Chand Jatav-vir =

Rao Manik Chand Jatav- was a Dalit activist and Member of 1st Lok Sabha from Sawai Madhopur, Rajasthan.
