= Kuchband =

The Kuchband are a Hindu caste found in the state of Haryana in India. They are also known as Gihara. The name Kuchband is derived from the Hindi word kuch, meaning a weavers brush, on account of their traditional occupation of manufacturing kuches. According to their traditions, the community emigrated from Rajasthan some three centuries ago. They are now found throughout Haryana, and speak Haryanvi. According to other traditions, the Kuchband are a sub-group of the Singikat community. Like other Hindu artisan castes, they no longer practice their traditional craft. Most Kuchband are now landless agricultural labourers.

Like other Hindus, the community is strictly endogamous, and practice clan exogamy. Their clans are known as gotras, the main ones being Goyal, Banjara, Vaid, Benewal, Uthwal, Soda and Athwar.
