= Chamar =

Dalit caste of the Indian subcontinent

Total population
- c. 53 million

Regions with significant populations
- India • Pakistan

Languages
- Hindi • Punjabi

Religion
- Hinduism • Islam • Sikhism • Ravidassia • Christianity

Related ethnic groups
- Jatav • Ramdasia • Ravidassia • Raigar • Chambhar • Dhusia • Madiga • Ad-Dharmi • Ahirwar

Chamar (IPA: [tʃəmaːɾ], or Jatav, IPA: [dʒaːt̪əʋ]) is a community classified as a Scheduled Caste under modern India's system of affirmative action that originated from the group of trade persons who were involved in leather tanning and shoemaking. They are found throughout the Indian subcontinent, mainly in the northern states of India and in Bangladesh, Pakistan and Nepal.

== History ==
The Chamars are traditionally associated with leather work. Ramnarayan Rawat posits that the association of the Chamar community with a traditional occupation of tanning was constructed, and that the Chamars were instead historically agriculturists.

In modern times the term chamar is often used pejoratively and regarded as a casteist slur. The Supreme Court of India has ruled that the term is nowadays "abusive language" and "highly offensive", and that addressing a member of the Chamar caste as "Chamar", if done in public view and with the intent to insult and humiliate him, is a criminal offence under the Scheduled Caste and Scheduled Tribe (Prevention of Atrocities) Act, 1989.

=== Movement for upward social mobility ===
Between the 1830s and the 1950s, the Chamars in the United Provinces, especially in the Kanpur area, became prosperous as a result of their involvement in the British leather trade.

By the late 19th century, the Chamars began rewriting their caste histories, claiming Kshatriya descent. For example, around 1910, U.B.S. Raghuvanshi published Shri Chanvar Purana from Kanpur, claiming that the Chamars were originally a community of Kshatriya rulers. He claimed to have obtained this information from Chanvar Purana, an ancient Sanskrit-language text purportedly discovered by a sage in a Himalayan cave. According to Raghuvanshi's narrative, Vishnu, one of the principal deities in Hinduism, once appeared in form of a Shudra before the community's ancient king Chamunda Rai. The king chastised Vishnu for reciting the Vedas, an act forbidden for a Shudra. The god then revealed his true self, and cursed his lineage to become Chamars, who would be lower in status than the Shudras. When the king apologized, the god declared that the Chamars will get an opportunity to rise again in the Kaliyuga after the appearance of a new sage (whom Raghuvanshi identifies as Ravidas).

A section of Chamars claimed Kshatriya status as Jatavs, tracing their lineage to Krishna, another major deity in Hinduism, and thus, associating them with the Yadavs. Jatav Veer Mahasabha, an association of Jatav men founded in 1917, published multiple pamphlets making such claims in the first half of the 20th century. The association discriminated against lower-status Chamars, such as the "Guliyas", who did not claim Kshatriya status.

In the first half of the early 20th century, the most influential Chamar leader was Swami Achutanand, who founded the anti-Brahmanical Adi Hindu movement, and portrayed the lower castes as the original inhabitants of India, who had been enslaved by Aryan invaders.

=== Political rise ===
In the 1940s, the Indian National Congress promoted the Chamar politician Jagjivan Ram to counteract the influence of B.R. Ambedkar; however, he remained an aberration in a party dominated by the upper castes. In the second half of the 20th century, the Ambedkarite Republican Party of India (RPI) in Uttar Pradesh remained dominated by Chamars/Jatavs, despite attempts by leaders such as B.P. Maurya to expand its base.

After the decline of the RPI in the 1970s, the Bahujan Samaj Party (BSP) attracted Chamar voter base. It experienced electoral success under the leadership of the Chamar leaders Kanshi Ram and Mayawati; Mayawati who eventually became the Chief Minister of Uttar Pradesh. Other Dalit communities, such as Bhangis, complained of Chamar monopolisation of state benefits such as reservation. Several other Dalit castes, resenting the domination of Dalit politics by Chamars/Jatavs, came under the influence of the Sangh Parivar.

Nevertheless, with the rise of BSP in Uttar Pradesh, a collective solidarity and uniform Dalit identity was framed, which led to coming together of various antagonistic Dalit communities. In the past, Chamar had shared bitter relationship with the Pasis, another Dalit caste. The root cause of this bitter relationship was their roles in feudal society. The Pasis worked as lathail or stick wielders for the "Upper Caste" landlords and the later had compelled them in past to beat Chamars many a times. Under the unification drive of BSP, these rival castes came together for the cause of unity of Dalits under same political umbrella.

=== Social exploitation ===
In reference to villages of Rohtas and Bhojpur district of Bihar, prevalence of a practice was revealed, in which it was obligatory for the women of Chamar, Musahar and Dusadh community to have sexual contacts with their Rajput landlords. In order to keep their men in submissive position, these upper-caste landlords raped these Dalit women, and often implicate the male members of latter's family in false cases, when they refused sexual contacts with them. The other form of oppression which was inflicted on them was disallowing them to walk on the pathways and draw water from the wells, which belonged to Rajputs. The "pinching of breast" by the upper caste landlords and the undignified teasings were also common form of oppression. In the 1970s, the activism of peasant organizations like "Kisan Samiti" is said to have brought an end to these practices and subsequently the dignity was restored to the women of lower castes. The oppression however was not fully stopped as the friction between upper-caste landlords and the tillers continued. There are reports which indicates that the upper-caste landlords often took the help of Police in order to beat the women of Chamar caste and draw them out of their villages on the question of parity in wages.

== Chamar Caste in different States of India ==
=== Ad-Dharmi ===
The Ad-Dharmi is a Chamar caste sect in the state of Punjab, in India and is an alternative term for the Ravidasia religion, meaning Primal Spiritual Path. The term Ad-Dharm came into popular usage in the early part of the 20th century, when many followers of Guru Ravidas converted to Sikhism and were severely discriminated against due to their low caste status (even though the Sikh religion is strictly against the caste system). Many of these converts stopped attending Sikh Gurdwaras controlled by Jat Sikhs and built their own shrines upon arrival in the UK, Canada, and Fiji Island. Ad-Dharmis comprise 11.48% of the total of Scheduled Caste communities in Punjab.

=== Ahirwar ===
The Ahirwar, or Aharwar are Dalit members of a north Indian caste categorised among the Scheduled Castes of Chamar. Predominantly are members of the Scheduled Castes with a higher population in Uttar Pradesh, Madhya Pradesh.

They are present, for example, in the state of Madhya Pradesh. The 2001 Census of India recorded them in the Bundelkhand area and as the largest caste group in Lalitpur district, Uttar Pradesh, with a total population of 138,167.

=== Dhusia ===
Dhusia is a caste in India, associated with Chamars, Ghusiya, Jhusia or Jatav. They are found in Uttar Pradesh, and elsewhere.

Most of the Dhusia in Punjab and Haryana migrated from Pakistan after the partition of India. In Punjab, they are mainly found in Ludhiana, Patiala, Amritsar and Jalandhar cities. They are inspired by B. R. Ambedkar to adopt the surnames Rao and Jatav.

=== Jatav ===
Jatav (also known as Jatava, Jatan, Jatua, Jhusia, Jatia, Jatiya) is an Indian Dalit community that is a sub-caste of the Chamar caste, who are classified as a Scheduled Caste under modern India's system of positive discrimination.

According to the 2011 Census of India, the Jatav community of Uttar Pradesh comprised 54% of that state's total 22,496,047 Scheduled Caste population.

=== Ravidassia/Ramdasia ===
Ravidassia is sect of Chamar Sikhs from Punjab who worship Guru Ravidass and Ramdasia were historically a Sikh, Hindu sub-group that originated from the caste of leather tanners and shoemakers known as Chamar.

Both the words Ramdasia and Ravidasia are also used inter changeably while these also have regional context. In Puadh and Malwa, largely Ramdasia is used while Ravidasia is predominantly used in Doaba.

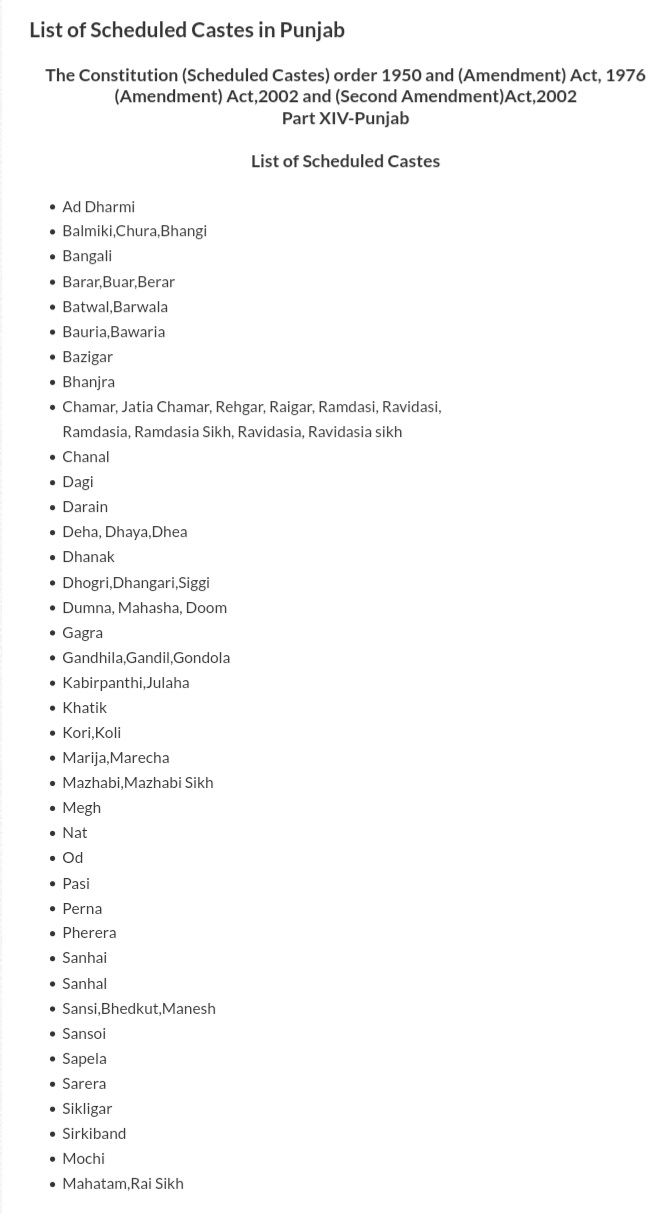
List of Scheduled Castes in Punjab

== Chamar Diaspora ==
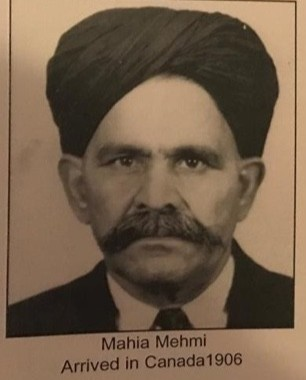
Mahia Mehmi- One of the first Chamar settler in Canada in 1906.

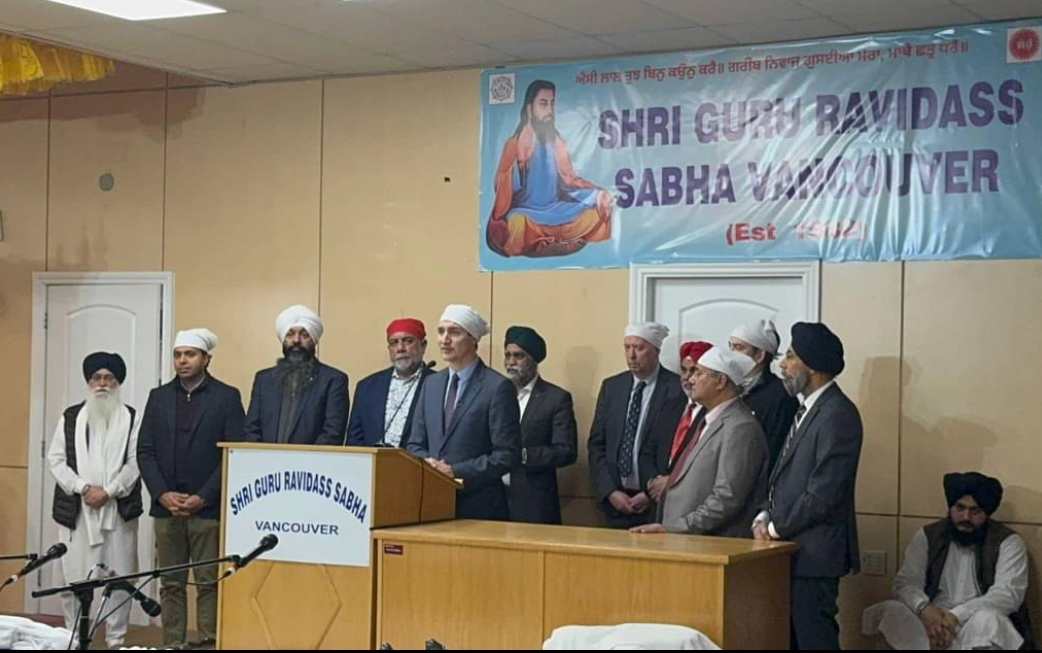
Former Canadian Prime Minister Justin Trudeau at Guru Ravidass Temple, Vancouver

The Chamar diaspora consists of different subcastes who have emigrated from the different states of British India, as well as modern India, to other countries and regions of the world, as well as their descendants. Apart from the Indian subcontinent, there is a large and well-established community of Chamars throughout different continents of the world, including Malaysia, Canada, Singapore, Caribbean, USA and UK, where they have established themselves as a trade diaspora.

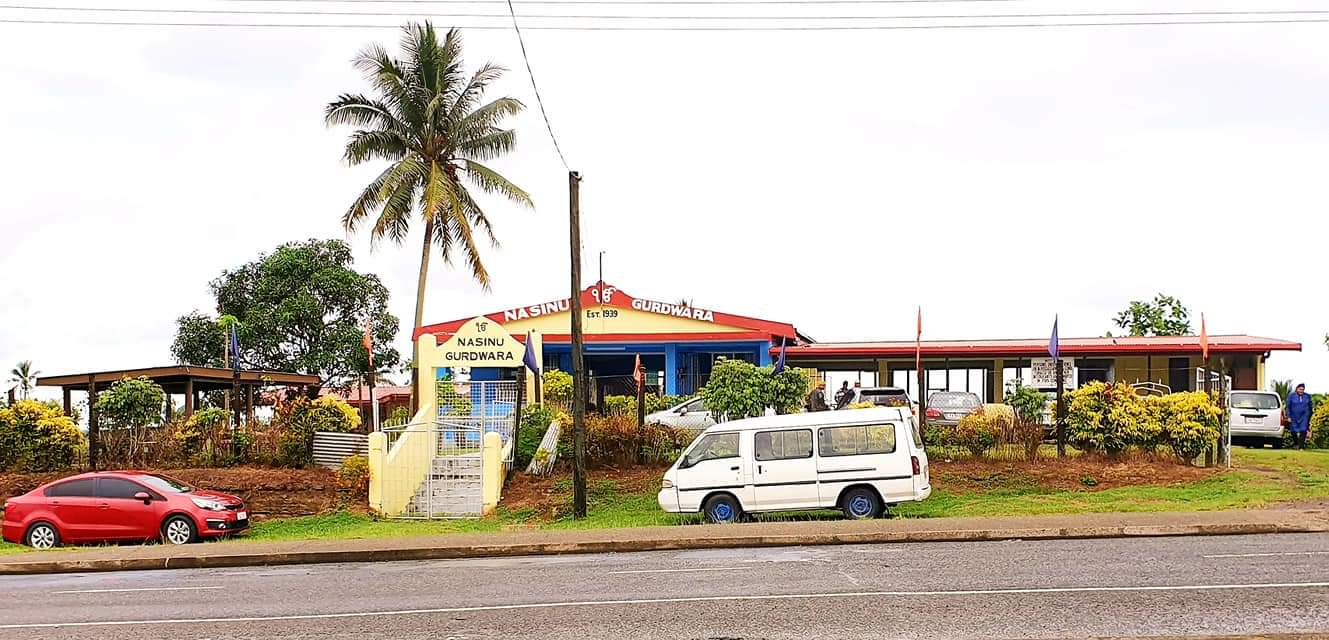
Gurdwara Guru Ravidass, Nasinu, Fiji Established in 1939

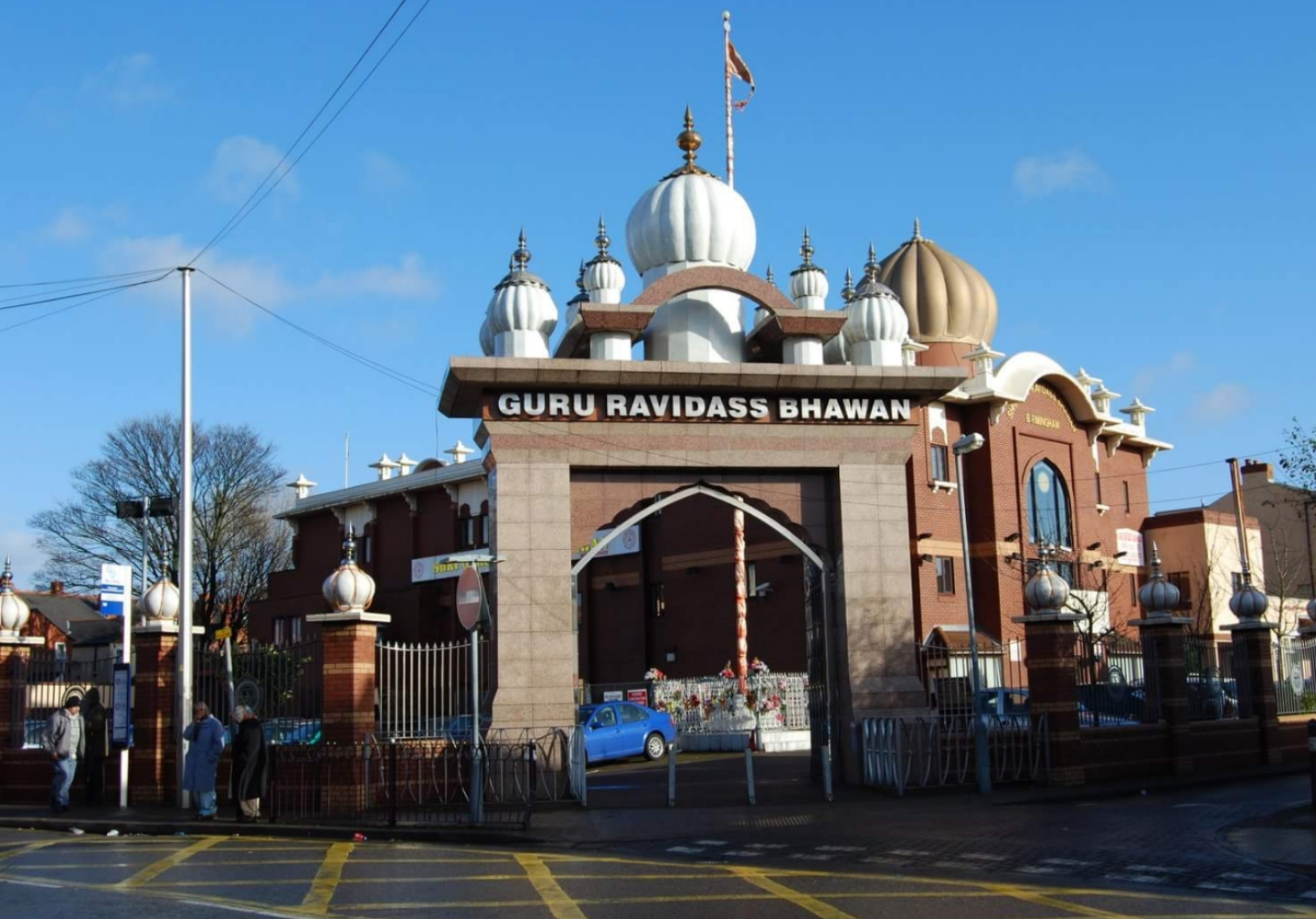
Gurdwara Guru Ravidass Bhavan, Birmingham

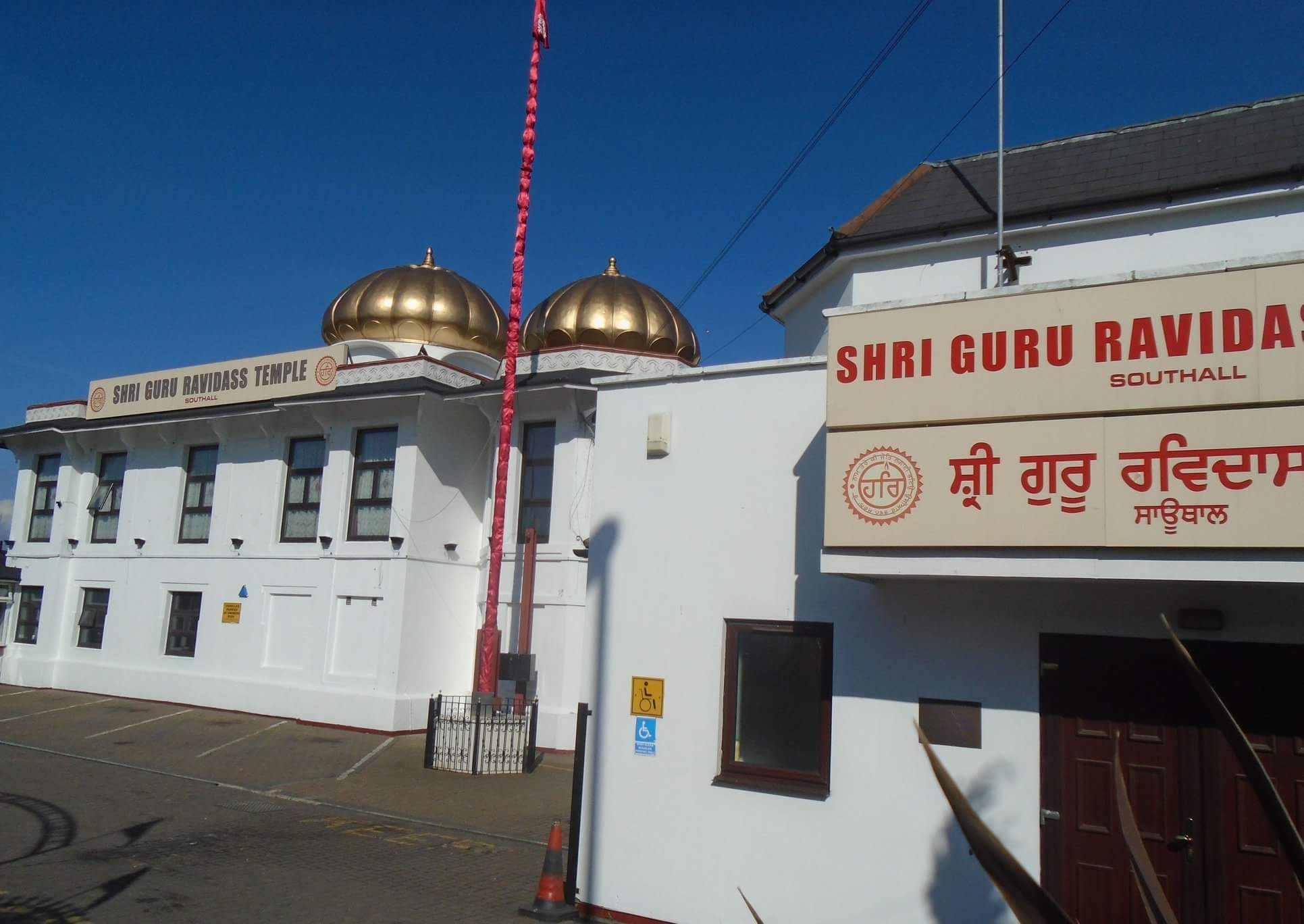
Gurdwara Guru Ravidass Sabha, Southall

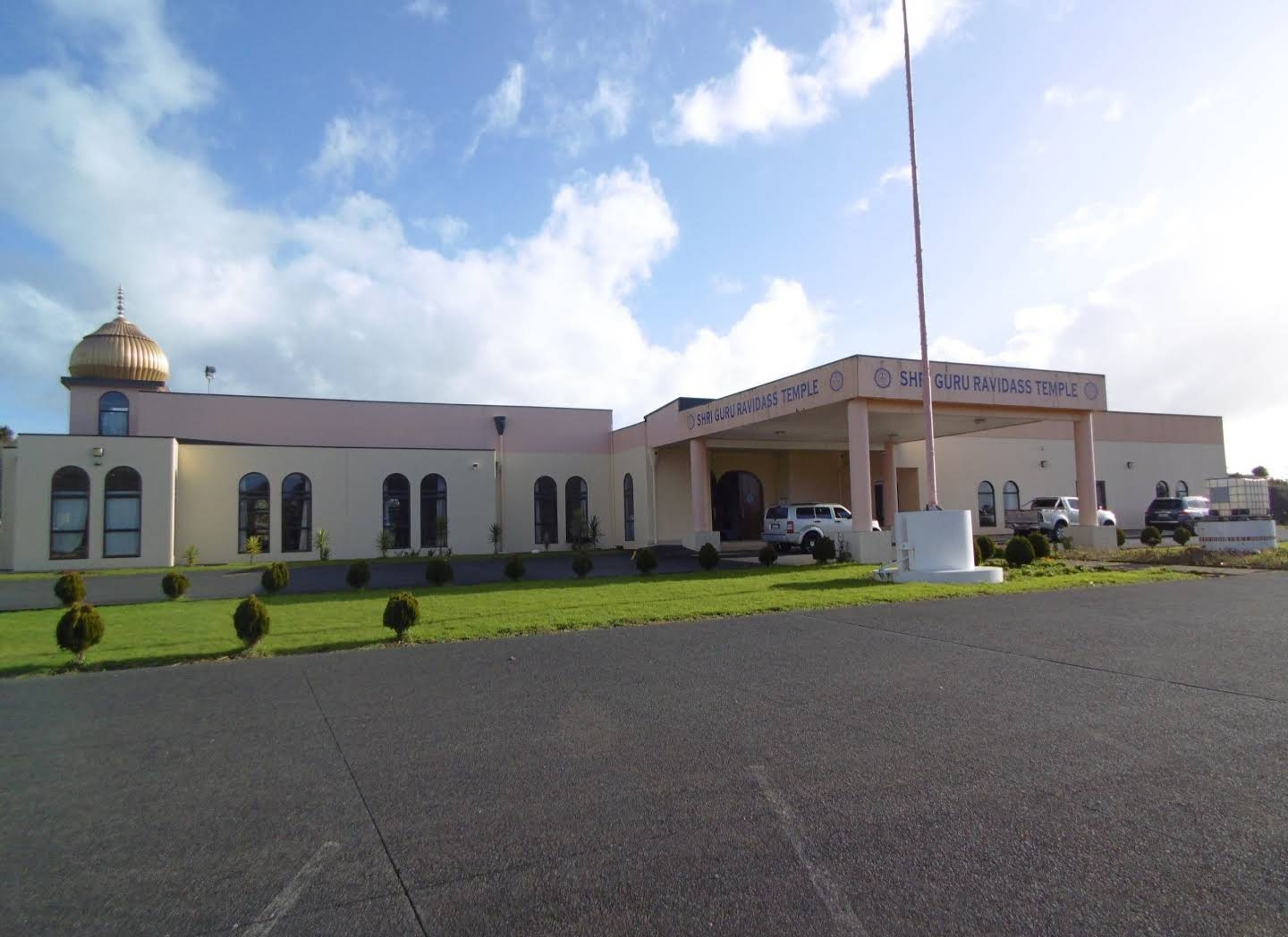
Gurdwara Guru Ravidass Temple, Auckland

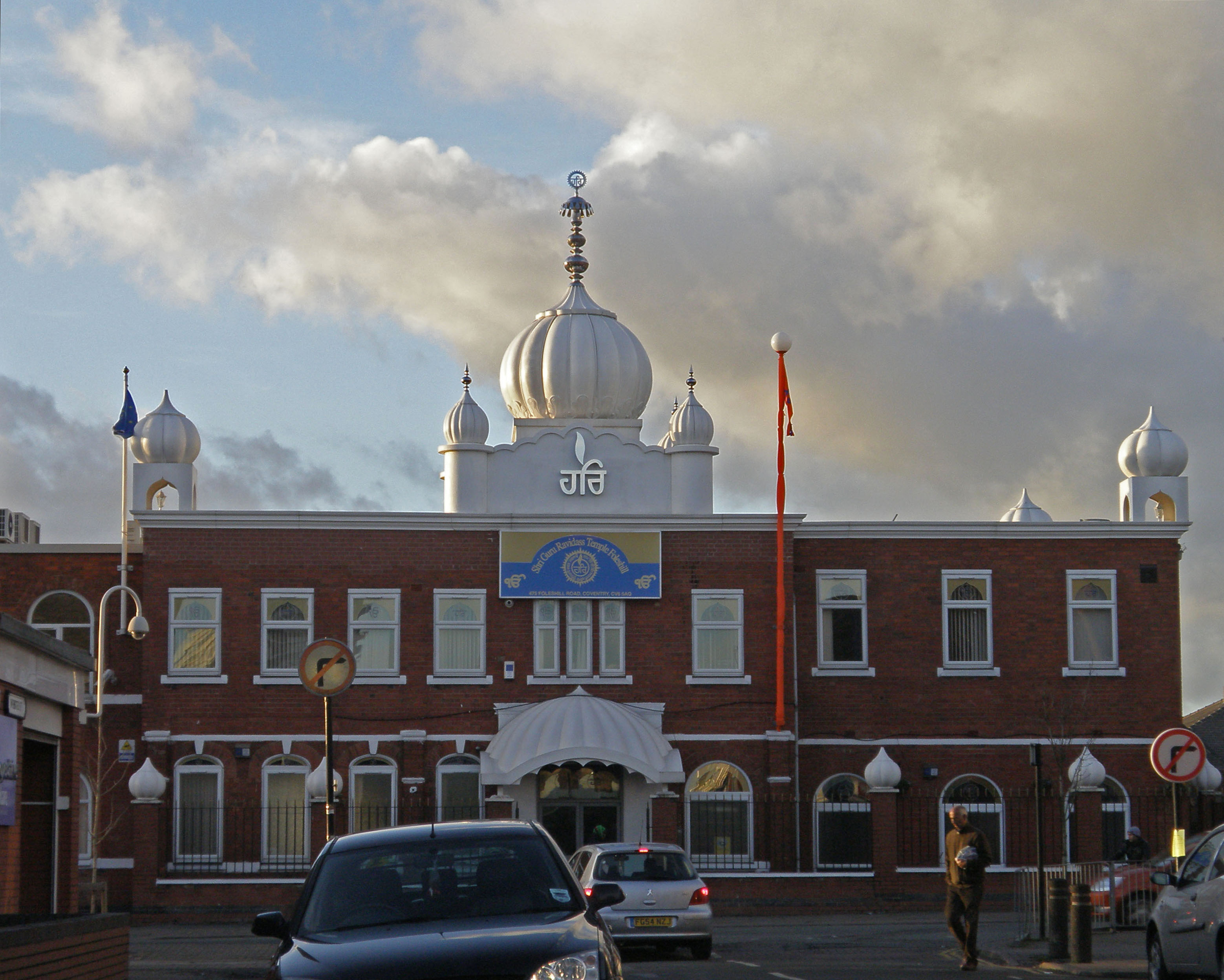
Shri Guru Ravidass Temple in the UK

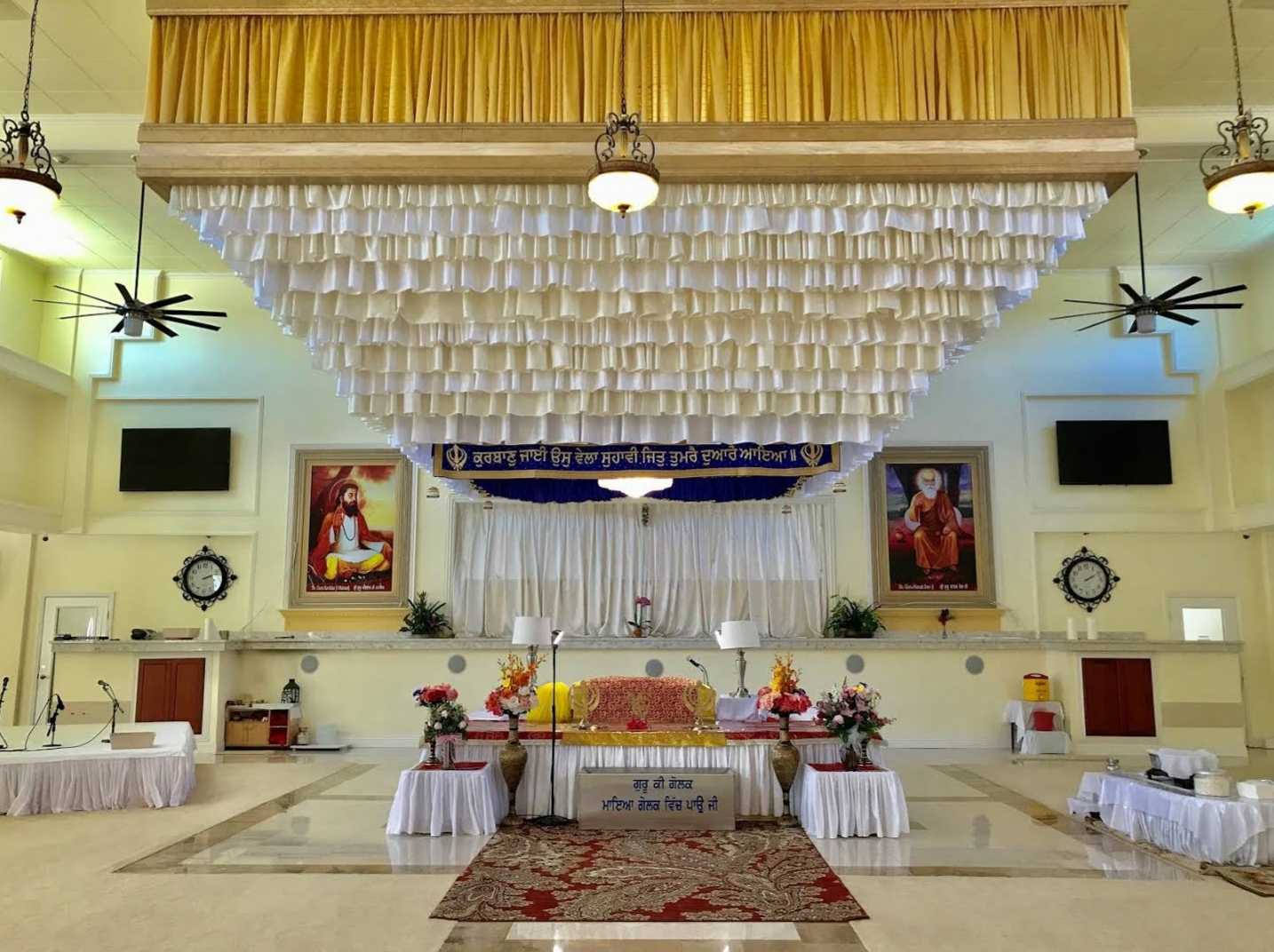
Gurdwara Guru Ravidass Temple, Pittsburg, California

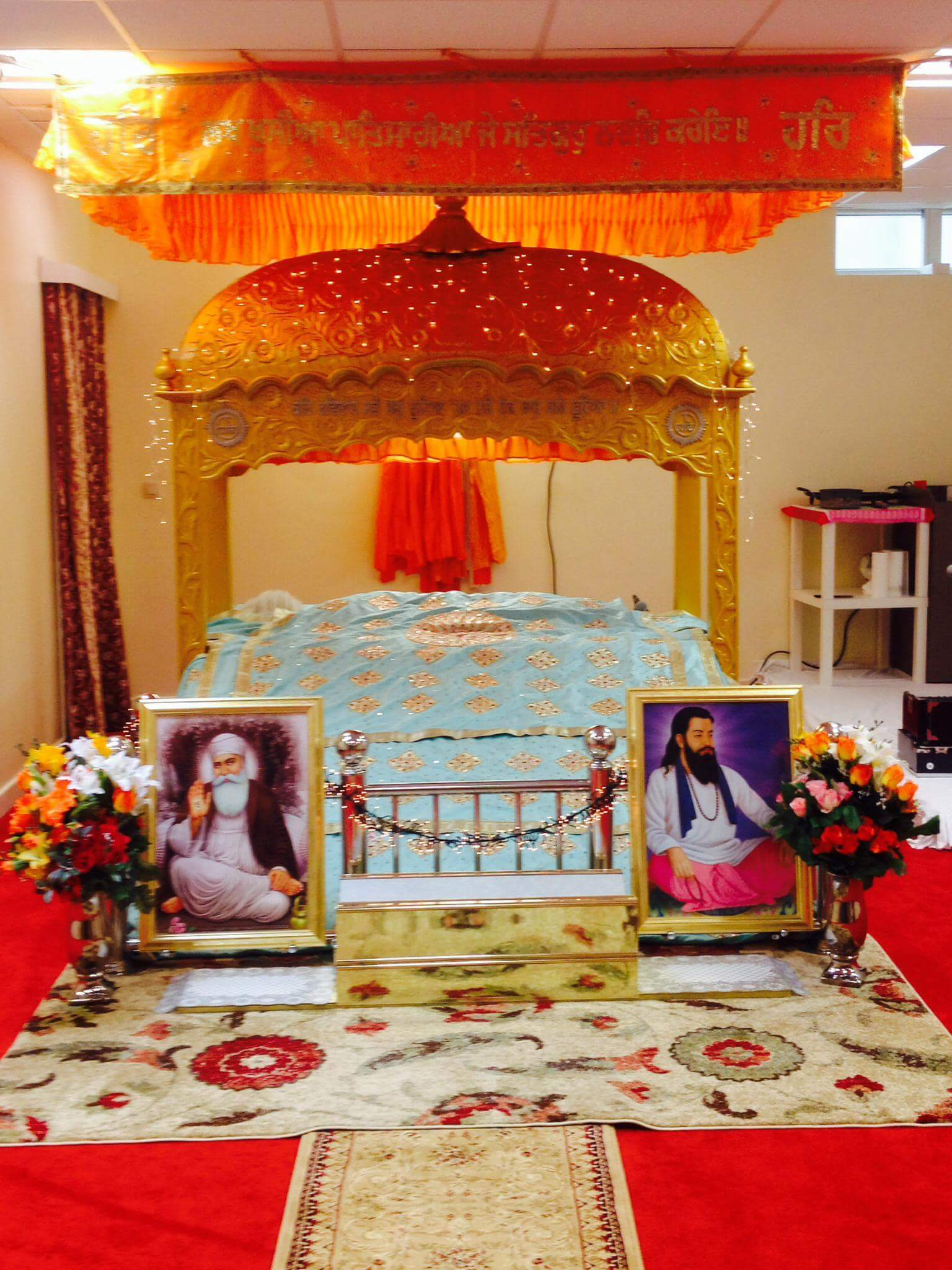
Gurdwara Guru Ravidass Sabha, Oostende

=== Italy ===
According to the research paper of the European University Institute, Fiesole, Italy, the Ravidassia Chamar community is the second largest group of Indian diaspora in Italy. The Ravidassia community's migration starts in the early 80s, and currently the community is operating 18 Guru Ravidass temples throughout Italy. But due to the lack of recognized independent religious identity by the Italian government, the local Italian community leaders assume Ravidasias are Hindu or Sikh.

=== North America ===
Chamar diaspora emigrated from India and Pakistan is significant. There are Chamar Sikh settlers in Europe, as well as a sizable Chamar Sikh population in North America, primarily in the United States and Canada. Mahiya Ram Mehmi and Mahey were the very first people who landed in British Columbia in 1906 and in Lower Mainland area of British Colombia, there are around 25,000 people of Chamar origin residing. This makes the largest and oldest Chamar diaspora population in North America region. Both Mahiya ram Mehmi and Mahey were also involved in the foundation of the first Canadian Gurdwara, the Khalsa Diwan Society, Vancouver. In the United States, an estimated 20,000 Ravidassia Chamars live in California.

=== Mauritius ===
Ravived is a caste that is mainly found among Hindus in Mauritius. The origin of this caste lay in an Indian caste named Chamar This same caste is referred to as Ravidassia outside Mauritius, and this terminology is very seldom used in Mauritius.

In the ship records on which Indian laborers migrated to Mauritius, around ten percent of the boarded people mentioned their caste as Chamar. After the establishment of caste hierarchies in Mauritius, the Chamar community families turned to the religious songs of Kabir and Ravidass for their own religious outlet. Slowly, they started adopting religious-sounding names from these devotional songs.

=== Oceania ===
There is a sizeable population of Chamar Sikhs in Oceania too. Ravidassia Chamars from Doaba established the second gurdwara in the Oceania region in Nasinu on Fiji Island in 1939. A Classical Study by W.H. Briggs in his book Punjabis in New Zealand, Briggs penned down the precise number of Ravidassias in New Zealand during the very first wave of immigration.

=== United Kingdom ===
Chamar community from Punjab started immigrating from Punjab to Britain in 1950, and according to a book named 'Sikhs in Britain: An Annotated Bibliography' published in 1987, the population of the Ravidassia community in the West Midlands was around 30,000 during that period. As of 2021, it is estimated that the Ravidasia population in Britain is around 70,000.

== Occupations ==
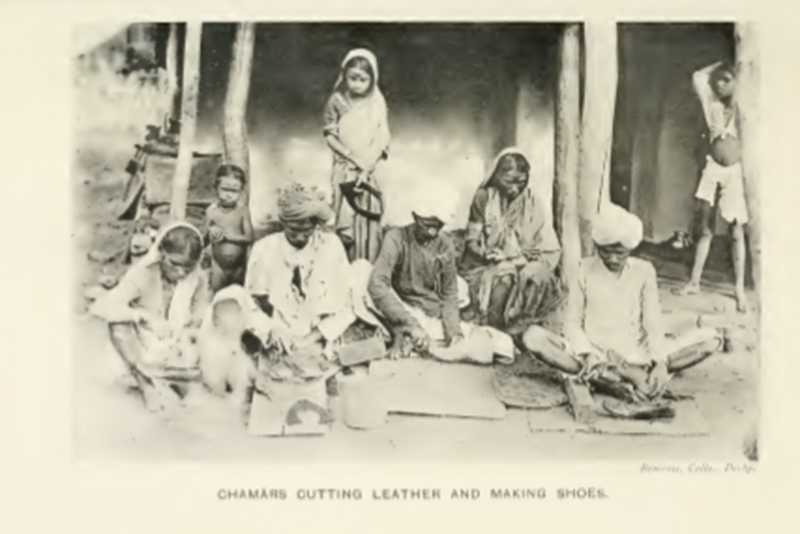
Photograph of Chamars with caption "Chamars cutting leather and making shoes"

Chamars transitioning from tanning and leathercraft to the weaving profession adopt the identity of Julaha Chamar, aspiring to be acknowledged as Julahas by other communities. According to R. K. Pruthi, this change reflects a desire to distance themselves from the perceived degradation associated with leatherwork.

== Chamar Regiment ==
The 1st Chamar Regiment was an infantry regiment formed by the British during World War II. Officially, it was created on 1 March 1943, as the 27th Battalion 2nd Punjab Regiment. It was converted to the 1st Battalion and later disbanded shortly after World War II ended. The Regiment, with one year of service, received three Military Crosses and three Military Medals It fought in the Battle of Kohima. In 2011, several politicians demanded that it be revived.

== Demographics ==
Chamar caste population in different states of India as per the 2011 census of India

State, U.T	Population	Population %	Notes
Andhra Pradesh	3,312	<0.01%	Counted along Mochi, Muchi, Chamar-Ravidas, Chamar-Rohidas
Bihar	4,900,048	4.7%	Counted along Rabidas, Rohidas, Chamar, Charamakar
Chandigarh	59,957	5.68%	Counted along with other caste synonyms such as Chamars, Ramdasi, Ravidasi, Raigar and Jatia
Chhattisgarh	2,318,964	9.07%	Counted as Chamar, Satnami, Ahirwar, Raidas, Rohidas, Jatav, Bhambi and Surjyabanshi
NCT of Delhi	1,075,569	6.4%	Counted along with other caste synonyms such as Jatav, Chamars, Ramdasia, Ravidasi, Raigar and Jatia
Gujarat	1,032,128	1.7%	Counted along with other caste synonyms such as Chamar, Bhambi, Asadaru, Chambhar, Haralaya, Rohidas, Rohit, Samgar
Haryana	2,429,137	9.58%	Counted along with other caste synonyms such as Jatav, Chamars, Ramdasia, Ravidasi, Raigar and Jatia
Himachal Pradesh	458,838	6.68%	Counted along with other caste synonyms such as Chamars, Ramdasia, Raigar and Jatia
Jammu and Kashmir	212,032	1.72%	Counted along with other caste synonyms such as Chamars, Ramdasia, Rohidas
Jharkhand	1,008,507	3.05%	Counted as Chamar, Mochi
Karnataka	605,486	1%	Counted as Rohidas, Rohit, Samgar, Haralaya, Chambhar, Chamar, Bhambi
Madhya Pradesh	5,368,217	7.39%	Counted as Chamar, Jatav, Bairwa, Bhambi, Rohidas, Raidas, Ahirwar, Satnami, Ramnami, Surjyabanshi
Maharashtra	1,411,072	1.25%	Counted as Rohidas, Chamar, Chambhar, Bhambi, Satnami, Ramnami, Haralaya, Rohit, Samagar, Bhambi
Punjab	3,095,324	11.15%	During the 2011 census in Punjab, 1017192 people were counted as addharmi in a separate caste cluster, which is another term for Ravidassias. In the same census, the Ravidassias cluster population was 2078132, and both clusters together made a population of 3095324 in Punjab, which is an 11.15% population of Punjab.
Rajasthan	2,491,551	3.63%	Counted along with other caste synonyms such as Chamars, Bhambi, Ramdasia, Ravidasi, Raigar, Haralaya, Chambhar and Jatia
Telangana	17,068	0.01%	Counted along Mochi, Muchi, Chamar-Ravidas, Chamar-Rohidas
Uttarakhand	548,813	5.44%	Counted as Chamar, Jatava, Dhusia, Jhusia
Uttar Pradesh	22,496,047	11.25%	Counted as Chamar, Jatava, Dhusia, Jhusia
West Bengal	1,039,591	1.13%	Counted as Chamar, Rabidas, Charamakar, Rishi

== Caste reservation ==
Chamar is classified as a scheduled caste in India. It is claimed that among the scheduled castes, Chamar benefitted more from the caste reservation system as compared to other Dalit castes due to larger political representation of the group. However, due to significant regional variation and intra-community diversity, different communities end up disproportionately benefiting from the reservation across the country. In 2024, the Supreme Court of India allowed further sub-categorisation within the Scheduled Caste and Scheduled Tribe categories, allowing states such as Punjab, Bihar, Tamil Nadu, and Andhra Pradesh to do targeted refinements to their reservation policies.

== Chamars in Nepal ==
The Central Bureau of Statistics of Nepal classifies the Chamar as a subgroup within the broader social group of Madheshi Dalits. At the time of the 2011 Nepal census, 335,893 people (1.3% of the population of Nepal) were Chamar. The frequency of Chamars by province was as follows:

- Madhesh Province (4.2%)
- Lumbini Province (2.1%)
- Koshi Province (0.3%)
- Bagmati Province (0.0%)
- Gandaki Province (0.0%)
- Karnali Province (0.0%)
- Sudurpashchim Province (0.0%)

The frequency of Chamars was higher than national average (1.3%) in the following districts:

- Parasi (7.4%)
- Siraha (5.7%)
- Parsa (4.7%)
- Bara (4.4%)
- Saptari (4.3%)
- Dhanusha (3.8%)
- Rautahat (3.8%)
- Kapilvastu (3.7%)
- Rupandehi (3.7%)
- Mahottari (3.6%)
- Sarlahi (3.6%)
- Banke (1.9%)

== Notable people ==
- Guru Ravidass, was an Indian mystic poet-saint of the Bhakti movement during the 15th to 16th century CE.
- Mayawati, leader of Bahujan Samaj Party and Chief Minister of Uttar Pradesh.
- Gunabai Gadekar – social activist
- Meira Kumar - Former Diplomat, Former Speaker of the Lok Sabha.
- Selja Kumari - Current Member of Parliament, Former Union Cabinet Minister-Government of India.
- Atma Doolooa - Mauritian Politician, Former Director of State Trading Corporation Director of Development Works Corporation, Mauritius and Former Advisor at Ministry of Commerce and Cooperatives, Mauritius.
- Mata Prasad - Former Chief Secretary in Uttar Pradesh Government and former Chairman of the Union Public Service Commission.
- Mohan Lal Kureel, a British Indian Army officer who served in The Chamar Regiment and later an Indian National Congress politician in the Indian state of Uttar Pradesh.
- Jagjivan Ram, former Deputy Prime Minister of India
- Kanshi Ram (1934–2006), founder of Bahujan Samaj Party and mentor of Mayawati Kumari
- Navneet Kaur Rana, former actress and former Member of Parliament
- Ashok Tanwar, former Member of Parliament
- Ram Dhan - Freedom fighter and former Member of Parliament.
- Charanjit Singh Channi - Current Member of Parliament and former Chief Minister of Punjab.
- Ram Sundar Das - Former Chief Minister of Bihar.
- Ashok Khade - Indian Industrialist.
- Anju Bala - Former Member of Parliament.
- Mahendra Ram - a recipient of the Sangeet Natak Akademi Award for the Rasan Chauki folk tunes.

== See also ==
- Ahirwar
- Ramdasia
- Ravidassia
- Jatav
- Chambhar
- Dhor
- Hindu Mochi
- Muslim Mochi
