= Jatav =

Dalit caste of India

जाटव

Languages
- Hindi, Awadhi, Rajasthani, Haryanvi

Religion
- Hinduism (majority) and Buddhism & Ravidassia Panth (minority)

Jatav, also known as Jatava/Jatan/ Jatua/Jhusia /Jatia/Jatiya, is an Indian Dalit community that are considered to be a sub-caste of the Chamar caste, who are classified as a Scheduled Caste under modern India's system of positive discrimination.

According to the 2011 Census of India, the Jatav community of Uttar Pradesh comprised 54% of that state's total 22,496,047 Scheduled-Caste population.

== History ==
Some Jatav authors have disputed being Scheduled. In the 1920s, Jatavs claimed to be survivors of the ancient war between Parashuram, the legend of the Brahmins, and Kshatriyas, forced into hiding. Their proof of ancestry is a series of correspondences or status similarities between Jatav and other Kshatriya clans. According to Owen Lynch, "These included identical gotras, and such Kshatriya-like ceremonies as shooting a cannon at weddings and the use of the bow and arrow at the birth saṃskāra".

According to M. P. S. Chandel

Jatavs pressed hard for their (Kshatriya) claim. But as is said many times earlier that in the caste federal system of India, changes seldom occur and in case of scheduled castes as also established by M. N. Shrinivas there are no chances at all. So the caste of Jatavs went to a predestined end. It is unfortunate that such a powerful effort (Lynch 1969) could result in nothing but the result in other fields were rewarding and exemplary. Jatav elites using cultural sentiments and striking the chord of psyche succeeded in pursuing several strategies in getting political successes.

In the early part of the 20th century, the Jatavs attempted the process of sanskritisation, claiming themselves to be historical of the Kshatriya varna. They gained political expertise by forming associations and by developing a literate cadre of leaders, and they tried to change their position in the caste system through the emulation of upper-caste behavior. As a part of this process, they also claimed not to be Chamars and petitioned the government of the British Raj to be officially classified differently: disassociating themselves from the Chamar community would they felt, enhance their acceptance as Kshatriya. These claims were not accepted by other castes and, although the government was amenable, no official reclassification as a separate community occurred due to the onset of World War II. An organisation of young Jatavs, called the Jatav Vir, was formed in Agra in 1917, and a Jatav Pracharak Sangh was organised in 1924. They joined with local Banias to establish a front and thus one of them won the seat of the mayor in Agra, and another became a member of the Legislative Council.

Under the leadership of Jatav Mahasabha in the 1931 census, he took an aggressive stand for his demand to include Jatavs in the Kshatriya class and to rename them as 'Jatav' from Chanwar Chamar. They were successful and in the new census of India the Tanners were called 'Jatav'.

Earlier pressing for the Kshatriya status, the new issues emerged among Jatavs in 1944–45. The Jatavs formed the Scheduled Caste Federation of Agra having ties with the Ambedkar-led All India Scheduled Caste Federation. They started recognizing themselves as Scheduled Caste and hence "Dalit". This acceptance is attributed to the protections available to the scheduled castes.

According to Owen Lynch:

The change is due to the fact that Sanskritisation is no longer as effective a means as is political participation for achieving a change in the style of life and a rise in the Indian social system, now composed of both caste and class elements.

== Religion ==
Most of the Jatavs belong to the Hindu religion. Some Jatavs also became Buddhists in 1956, after B. R. Ambedkar converted to Buddhism. On September 5, 1990, around a thousand members of the Jatav community from village Jaunpur near Agra converted to Sikhism in a protest against the upper caste people who halted the marriage procession taken out by Jatav Chamar community.

Along with the mainstream religious identity, the Jatav community follows Guru Ravidas as well and gathered in tens of thousands as protestors in Delhi against the demolition of Ravidas Temple.

== Relationship with Dr. B. R. Ambedkar and the Dalit movement ==
Dr. B. R. Ambedkar's campaign for political representation, social equality and the abolition of untouchability influenced Dalit political movements throughout northern India.

During the 1930s and 1940s, Jatav leaders increasingly engaged with the constitutional debates concerning the Depressed Classes and Scheduled Castes.

By the mid-1940s, sections of the Jatav leadership in Agra had moved towards organised Ambedkarite politics. The formation of the Scheduled Castes Federation provided an important political framework for this mobilisation.

This development represented a significant shift from earlier strategies that had concentrated heavily on claims of higher caste status towards political representation, constitutional safeguards and collective rights.

== Demographics ==
Jatavs are often combined with Chamar, Ahirwar, Ravidassia and other subcastes and are given Scheduled Caste in major North Indian states under India's positive reservation system.

As of the 2011 Census, there were 22,496,047 Jatav/Chamars in the Indian state of Uttar Pradesh, of whom 22,371,352 declared themselves as Hindu, 113,765 declared themselves as Buddhist, and 10,930 declared themselves as Sikh. According to this census, Jatavs make 11.25% of the State's population.

Jatavs along with Jhusia, Dhusia, (Chamar Caste) in Uttar Pradesh by Districts (2011)
Districts	2011 India census	
Districts	Jatav, Chamar, Jhusia, Dhusia Caste Population	%
Agra	698,052	15.8%
Aligarh	448,957	12.22%
Ambedkar Nagar	476,378	19.87%
Amroha	272,548	14.81%
Ayodhya	82,033	3.32%
Auraiya	252,284	18.29%
Azamgarh	918,153	19.9%
Bagpat	101,703	7.81%
Bahraich	209,787	6.01%
Ballia	312,313	9.64%
Balrampur	36,929	1.72%
Banda	260,450	14.47%
Barabanki	253,468	7.77%
Bareilly	285,956	6.43%
Basti	390,962	15.86%
Bijnor	664,676	18.05%
Budaun	395,763	12.65%
Bulandshahr	543,381	15.53%
Chandauli	326,088	16.7%
Chitrakoot	151,148	15.24%
Deoria	310,322	10.01%
Etah	158,640	8.94%
Etawah	230,849	14.59%
Farrukhabad	150,180	7.97%
Fatehpur	234,667	8.91%
Firozabad	274,968	11.01%
Gautam Buddha Nagar	140,049	8.5%
Ghaziabad	552,299	16.52%
Ghazipur	551,443	15.23%
Gonda	80,635	2.35%
Gorakhpur	551,785	12.43%
Hamirpur	132,171	11.97%
Hardoi	568,601	13.89%
Hathras	256,879	16.42%
Jalaun	274,763	16.26%
Jaunpur	682,060	15.18%
Jhansi	296,345	14.83%
Kannauj	169,938	10.26%
Kanpur Dehat	263,541	14.67%
Kanpur Nagar	338,979	7.4%
Kasganj	163,835	11.4%
Kaushambi	105,054	6.57%
Kushinagar	313,738	7.8%
Lakhimpur Kheri	427,978	12.01%
Lalitpur	168,109	13.76%
Lucknow	281,541	6.13%
Maharajganj	289,658	10.79%
Mahoba	142,036	16.21%
Mainpuri	173,017	9.26%
Mathura	363,698	14.28%
Mau	366,689	16.62%
Meerut	468,170	13.6%
Mirzapur	318,382	12.75%
Moradabad	567,243	18.14%
Muzaffarnagar	419,594	14.62%
Pilibhit	119,926	5.9%
Pratapgarh	249,075	7.76%
Prayagraj	442,938	7.44%
Rae Bareli	253,489	8.73%
Rampur	205,052	8.78%
Saharanpur	640,625	18.48%
Sant Kabir Nagar	249,254	11.33%
Sant Ravidas Nagar	212,174	12.37%
Shahjahanpur	229,487	7.63%
Shravasti	41,129	3.68%
Siddharthnagar	271,095	10.59%
Sitapur	525,845	11.73%
Sonbhadra	217,580	11.68%
Sultanpur	319,156	14.19%
Unnao	325,301	10.47%
Varanasi	325,036	8.84%

== Notable Jatavs ==
- Chetram Jatav was a freedom fighter who participated in the Indian Rebellion of 1857.

== See also ==
- Jatav Mahasabha
- Ravidassia
- Mochi
- Chamar
- Chamar Regiment

== Sources ==
- Chandel, M. P. S. (1990). A Social Force in Politics: Study of Scheduled Castes of U.P. Mittal Publications. ISBN 9788170991939.
- Berger, Peter; Heidemann, Frank (2013). The Modern Anthropology of India: Ethnography, Themes and Theory. Routledge. ISBN 978-1-13406-118-1.
- Lynch, Owen M. (1970). "The Politics of Untouchability: A Case From Agra". In Singer, Milton B.; Cohn, Bernard S. (eds.). Structure and Change in Indian Society. Transaction Publishers. ISBN 978-0-20236-933-4.
- Rawat, Ramnarayan S. (2011). Reconsidering Untouchability: Chamars and Dalit history in North India. Indiana University Press. p. 127. ISBN 978-0-253-22262-6.
- Duncan, Ian (2019d). "Dalits and the Raj". The Indian Economic and Social History Review. 56 (2): 119–145. doi:10.1177/0019464619835646. S2CID 182465046.
