= Bir Bhan =

Satnami religious leader

Bir Bhan (1543–?), also spelt Birbhan, was a Dalit religious leader who was the founder of the first Satnami movement. He was a contemporary of Dadu and was influenced by Ravidas. He was the disciple of Uda Das.

== Biography ==
Bir Bhan was born in Bijesar near Narnaul in 1543. Bir Bhan had been influenced by Kabirpanth. According to an account of the Satnamis recorded by H. H. Wilson, Bir Bhan received a divine message from a satguru named Udaidas. As per Madan Gopal Gupta, Udai was a disciple of Ravidas and Bir Bhan became a disciple of Udai. Bir Bhan was a monotheist who used the moniker satnam for the divine, rejecting idolatry and casteism. He believed that meditation and living an honest-life was a way to experience unity with divinity. Some sources claim Bir Bhan died in 1620.

Bir Bhan founded the Satnampanth at Narnaul in present-day Haryana on 21 April 1657. (Note: The Bikrami date for the founding of the sect is V.S. 1714 Baisakh Sudi Dwadashi, Sukarwar.) Most of the followers of his sect drew from the Chamar caste. Followers of the sect refused to observe caste, were anti-authoratarian, and against the rich. Mughal historian Khafi Khan estamated that the Satnamis consisted of four or five thousand agricultural and mercantile families in the Narnaul and Mewat regions. In 1672, the movement rebelled against the Mughals in Punjab and Haryana (principally at Narnaul and Bairat) regarding taxation and were defeated, with the sect being nearly destroyed under Aurangzeb. Survivors of the sect may have contributed to the formulation of the later Sadh sect. Later Satnami revivalist leaders were Jagjivandas in Uttar Pradesh and Ghasidas in Chhattisgarh.
