= Dadupanth =

Indian religious sect

Dadupanth

- Dadu Dham in Naraina, Rajasthan, India
- Type: Panth
- Classification: Hinduism
- Scripture: Dadu Vani
- Headquarters: Dadu Dham in Naraina, Rajasthan, India
- Founder: Dadu Dayal
- Branched from: Sant Mat
- Slogan: Daduram Satyaram

Dādūpanth (meaning "path of Dādū"), also known as the Dādū Saṃpradāya, is a religious tradition or panth derived from the teachings of Dadu Dayal (1545? –8 May 1603), who was a nirguṇa-bhakti poet. Originally a Sant movement, the sect later underwent a process of Sanskritization and Vaishnavization owing to political circumstances in order to secure official patronage. The religious tradition is based in Naraina, Rajasthan and is mostly found in Rajasthan. The sect has a strong literary tradition. The sect advocates a personal and internally-based relationship with divinity.

== History ==
=== Background ===
The Sant Mat movement had been underway as a product of religious interactions between the Indian and Islamic worlds, focusing on shedding sectarian divisions through focus on internal veneration and mysticism. There was a shift toward Vaishnavism amongst the Sant movements, combining the Vaishnavist concept of bhakti with Sufi and Nāth (yogic) influences. Some notable Sant figures were Kabir, Ravidas, and Nanak.

=== Foundation ===
Dadu was a figure of the later Sant Mat movement who was active in Rajasthan who was influenced by both Hinduism and Islam. He was born perhaps in around 1544–1545 into the caste of cotton carders (Piñjārā, Dhuniyā), with Dadu having a low-caste background. One narrative is that an infant Dadu was found floating in water by a trader (saudāgar). As per one hagiography, he was born in Ahmedabad in Gujrat. One day, Dadu met an enigmatic old-man at the age of eleven and seven years later, he had a vision of the divine that would change the course of his life. In 1573, Dadu moved to Sambhar in Rajasthan. While in Sambhar, he had a vision of Kabir and Dadu began a spiritual career, characterized by rejecting ritualism and supposed miracles. Dadu kept himself inwardly detached and meditative whilst living a life of a cotton carder. He married and became a father. Dadu had four children, two sons, Garībdās and Maskīndās, and two daughters, Havā and Bāī, all of whom were active in the early Dadupanth, with their father being viewed later as a sādhu, despite Dadu having the life of a house-holder with a family. Dadu began travelling around Rajasthan.

Dadu was influenced by the Sant Mat (especially by Kabir, one Dadupanthi tradition claims Dadu was an incarnation of Kabir), the Nāthyoga, and Nizārī Ismāʿīlī traditions. In a similar manner to other Sants of the Sant Mat, Dadu challenged prevailing orthodox views and advocated for a "middle away" although not rejecting alternative traditions while doing so but rather restoring what he believed had been their original intent. Dadu did not consider himself a Hindu or Muslim, instead he advocated for the middle-path known as madhya. Dadu criticized six existing schools of religion in his hymns, which are known as the six darshanas, namely Yogis, Jangamas, Jains, Buddhists, Sanyasis, and Shaykhs:

jogī jaṃgama sevaṛe, bauddha saṃnyāsī śekha
ṣaddarśana Dādū rāma binā, sabai kapaṭa ke bhekha. (33.1//7)[7]

Translation:

Yogis, jangamas, sevaras (Jains), Buddhists, sanyasis and shaykhs—
Unless they have the name of Ram, the [proponents of the] six doctrines wear false religious costumes.

Dadu differed from the other Sants as while they were part of the guru-shishya tradition, Dadu is believed to not have had a human guru. Rather, hagiography claims Dadu had a divine vision of a mystical guru twice in his life which revealed revelation, when he was 11-years-old and when he was 18-years-old, with this mystical guru being called bābā būḍhāu (Old Bābā). A first-hand account by Dadu of this mystical revelation is found in the first couplets of the Dādūvāṇī. As per W. G. Orr, this guru was possibly the Qādirīya Sufi figure Šayḫ Buḍḍhan. Another view is that Dadu was a Nizārī Ismā῾īlī from Gujarat related to the cult of Rāmdev Pīr. Dadu rejected many aspects of the orthodox society, such as social divisions like castes, which brought him into conflict with some sections of the contemporary society he lived in. Despite this, the Sant movement was mature by the time Dadu lived and his teachings were similar to his predecessors and thus were more readily received by the populace as a result. Dadu rejected the Vedas, the caste system, pilgrimages, and visiting temples. Dadu also rejected idolatry, varṇāśrama rituals, austerities (tapas), and wearing religious signs on the body or religious garments. He emphasized repetition of the divine's name (japa) and believed that the human soul was the bride of God. The Dadupanthis had a strong tradition of asceticism, with them being vegetarians and teetotlers. Dadu considered the lifestyle of a sadhu to be superior to a house-holder, as he promoted the rejection of a worldly-life, viewing it as a hinderance to higher spirituality. Thus, he was seen as being detached from his family. Dadu and his followers likely practiced Nāth yoga, thus the Dadupanthis share some similarities with the Naths.

In 1579, Dadu shifted to Amber (Amer) which was under the control of the Kachvaha raja Bhagavantdās. As per the Dadupanthi tradition narrated by Jangopāl, Dadu in 1585 met Mughal emperor Akbar at Fatehpur Sikri under the recommendation of Bhagavantdās, which had an impact on Dadu. However, the meeting is only mentioned in Dadupanthi sources and its historicity is questioned but Jarosław Zapart believes there is some evidence the meeting plausibly occurred due to Akbar being in Fatehpur Sikri in 1585 and the Dadupanthi connection to Akbar via Bhagavantdās, whose residence was near Dadu's in Āmer. Horstmann (2015) believes the story is unlikely to have been made-up by the Dadupanthis and may have historical basis. Akbar often met privately with religious figures and was not oppressive to non-Muslim groups, maintaining ties with and conferring titles and grants upon the Rādhāvallabhas, Rāmānandīs, Gauḍīyas, Puṣṭimārgīs, Nāths, Jains, and Sikhs. Another view is that the story of Dadu meeting Akbar was an invention, created out of pedagogical need to assert Dadu's authority by using the most paramount, contemporary ruling figure of the era. The Dadupanthi hagiographies present Dadu meeting Akbar as a greater plan of the divine with Dadu as it's agent. In the tale, Dadu's dialogue consists of Dadu recommending Akbar to forfeit his kingdom as wealth was an obstacle to spirituality and treat all living beings with equality, with Akbar submitting to Dadu. As per the Dādū Janma Līlā (c. 1620), Dadu rejected Akbar offering him patronage.

However, despite being offered patronage by the Mughals and Rajputs, such as by Rājā Bīrbal and Mānsingh I, Dadu in the early hagiographies rejected their offers of patronage, considering himself to not be involved with kings. Royal patronage may have been rejected by Dadu to keep the community more independent and avoiding "worldly favors". This is a key difference between portrayals of Dadu and Kabir, where as Kabir is depicted as being hostile towards rulers, Dadu is shown instead to be communicating with them but ultimately rejecting their gifts, which also depicts him as superior to the ruling-class by declining them. This portrays the political authority of kings as being beneath the spiritual authority of Sants. As per Chandra (1992), Dadu rejected royal patronage because he viewed those structures of power as upholding social inequalities and hierarchies, such as in regards to caste, which Dadu was against. The narratives found in Jangopāl's account is that the Dadupanth could flourish without relying on official state patronage. However, a local ruler bestowed seven villages upon Dadu's community. Dadu remained at Amber until 1593, with him moving to Karaṛālā (present-day Kalyanpur). In 1602, he moved to Naraina where he was given land by a Kachvaha astriocrat, with Dadu dying there on 8 May 1603. Dadu was succeeded as a spiritual leader by his son Garībdās.

=== Immediate successors of Dadu (first three generations of leaders) ===
Mural of a Dadupanthi religious leader found in the interior of a chhatri associated with Dadupanth

The immediate successors and early leaders of the sect came from the family of Dadu, such as his children. People from all religious and caste backgrounds became followers of Dadu. Dadu's follower Bakhnā (died before 1637) was the first to use the term Dadupanthi to describe the followers whilst Rāghavdās' Bhaktmāl uses the term Dadupanth to describe the sect generally. Fifty-two chief disciples of Dadu are especially remembered by the sect (sometimes including Dadu's two daughters, as per the Bhaktmal), who are as follows along with the thambha (thāmbhās, meaning "settlements" or "cantonments") they founded:

1. Garib Das (Naraina)
2. Miskin Das (Naraina)
3. Sundar Das (Ghatra)
4. Sundar Das (Fatehpur)
5. Rajjab (Sanganer)
6. Dayal Das
7. Mohan (Marot, Marwar)
8. Mohan (Asom, Marwar)
9. Mohan
10. Mohan (Motiwara, Alwar)
11. Jag Jiwan (Dausa)
12. Jaggannath (Amber)
13. Gopal
14. Gopal
15. Gopal
16. Garib Das (Andhi)
17. Durjan Das (Idwa, Marwar)
18. Gharsi Das (Karail, Ajmer)
19. Jai Mal (Sambhar)
20. Jai Mal (Kalar, Marwar)
21. Tejanand (Jodhpur, Marwar)
22. Paramanand (Indogli, Marwar)
23. Banwari Das (Ratiya, Hissar)
24. Hari Das (Ranila, Hissar)
25. Sadhu Ram (Mandota, Punjab)
26. Hari Das
27. Kapil Muni (Gundor)
28. Chaturbhuj (Rampur, Bareilly)
29. Chatur Das (Kaladera)
30. Chatur Das (Singrawat, Marwar)
31. Charan Das (Chhaondiya)
32. Prayag Das (Didwana, Marwar)
33. Chain Ram (Kanota)
34. Chain Ram
35. Prahlad Das (Ghatra, Alwar)
36. Bakhna (tomb of Naraina)
37. Jagga (Broach)
38. Lal Das (Pranpitan, Gujarat)
39. Makhu Das (Gangaicha, Kotah)
40. Tila (Phumphliya)
41. Chanda (Naraina)
42. Hari Singh (Vidyad, Marwar)
43. Narayan Das (Nagal)
44. Jasa
45. Jhanjhu (Jotwara)
46. Banjhu (Jotwara)
47. Sant Das
48. Tiku Das (Nagal)
49. Shyam Das (Jalana)
50. Madhu Das (Gular, Marwar)
51. Nagar (Tahatra)
52. Nizam (Tahatra)

There first three generations of leaders of the Dadupanthis came from Dadu's immediate family. Gharib Das succeeded his father Dadu, with his installation as leader at Naraina likely being accepted by all lineages of the Dadupanthis at other places as well. A fore-head mark (tilak) was applied to Gharib Das to mark his succession. Since Naraina was the last place that Dadu lived and Gharib Das was installed as leader there, it became more esteemed than the other localities tied to the Dadupanthis. Gharib Das was given patronage by the Mughal emperor Jahangir, although some sources state he refused gifts from Jahangir. Gharib Das died in 1637, with the leadership of the sect being contested after his death. Gharib Das had nominated Kevalrām to succeed him but he was deposed as leader after a short term of four years by the younger brother of Gharib Das, Maskīndās. Thus, the sect experienced a fissure, with the followers who remained loyal to Kevalrām being known as the Garībdāsot lineage. Dadu's two daughters also forfeited their power to their brother Maskīndās. Maskīndās died in 1648, which caused another succession controversy but was ultimately succeeded by his son Fakīrdās. Fakīrdās died in 1693, ending the leaders who were descended from Dadu. This caused issues as there was no worthy successor from among Dadu's descendants and some lineages had gone astray from the central seat in Naraina, instead venerating local sādhus. According to Monika Horstmann, whilst the first-generation of Dadupanthi disciples venerated Dadu, the second-generation of disciples often venerated instead their guru of the first-generation rather than Dadu himself and may have not necessarily considered themselves as Dadupanthis as a result. This is due to the fluid and porous nature of the Sant sects of the era. Many of the early Dadupanthi leaders were women (such as the two daughters of Dadu and the aunt of Faqirdās) but later leaders were male-dominated.

According to Michael Allen, shortly after the death of Dadu the Dadupanthis also underwent a process of Vedānticization, a process initiated by the interpretations of Sundardās, who had studied Sanskrit, the Purāṇās, and Vedānta while at Benaras. He reinterpreted the legacy of Dadu in his Guru upadeś-jñān aṣṭak and Jñān-samudra treatises in line with that of yogic traditions (namely bhakti-yoga, haṭha-yoga, and sāṃkhya-yoga), alongside chiefly Advaita Vedānta metaphysics. The non-dualism that Dadu expressed would be described in Vedantic terms, such as turyātita, being achieved (sātkṣātkāra) by the techniques of śravaṇa, manana, and nidhidhyāsana. He also "Dādūized" Vedanta by combining it with the Sant Mat.

=== Fourth generation of leadership and beyond ===
Painting of a Dadupanthi, Tashrih al-aqvam, 1825

Prior to the late 17th century, the Dadupanthis did not exist as a single, cohesive community, rather its instituionalization occurred under a leader named Jaitram. The arti practice of the Dadupanthis toward their scripture, the Dadu Vani, developed in the late 17th century. Starting in the 18th century, the Dadupanthis began receiving the patronage of royalty and merchants. According to Jarosław Zapart, the Dadupanthis began taking on an increasingly Vaishnavist identity from the 17th to the 19th centuries due to increasing royal patronage from Rajput courts. Dadu began to be reinterpreted in a way that disassociated him from his low-caste and Muslim origin. For example the spiritual teacher of Dadu, Bābā Būḍhā (who may have been Shaikh Buddhan, a Qādirīyah Sufi saint of Sambhar) was re-envisioned as being an old (būḍhā) man who was an emanation of Hari. Sundardās gave this teacher a Vaishnavist-inflected name, Vriddhānanda. Thus, the nirguṇī panth of the Dadupanthis underwent a process of Sanskritization in order to connect with the "broader cultural, religious, and political milieu". To attract followers, Dadu was Sanskritized, deified, and claimed to have been the incarnation of Kabir. Under the administration of Savāī Jaisingh II, there was pressure enacted on heterodox saṃpradāyas (including bhakti sects) that had been against the varṇāśrama-dharma to nominally accept through taking upon the identity of one of the four orthodox Vaiṣṇava schools (catuḥsaṃpradāya) at the threat of exile or losing their leadership unless they are able to prove textually their doctrinal independence. The ruler also specifically wrote to the Dadupanthis, in 1725 and 1733, to stop their relations with Muslims. Ultimately, this led to the elevation of upper-castes in Dadupanth and the introduction of Vaishnavist practices, with lesser coherence and fragmentation with the original tenets. The earlier phase of Vedantaization started by Sundardās (which attempted to combine Vedanta with nirguṇa-bhakti) was continued in a second-phase by the Dadupanthi writer Nischaldas (who instead wrote about a more "pure" form of Vedanta), who authored the Vicāra Sāgara and Vṛtti Prabhākara treatises that were Vedantic and heavily influenced by Sanskritic scholarly tradition. He also believed Dadu was a form of Brahman.

Painting of a Dadupanthi, by Kapur Singh, Punjab Plains, ca.1875

The fourth leader of the sect, the first whom was not related to Dadu, was a Brahmin celibate named Jaitrām (d. 1732), who became leader in 1693. Based upon the policies of Jaisingh, Jaitram enacted reforms within Dadupanth in order to continue state patronage of the sect. Jaitram is attributed as establishing Naraina as the supreme seat of power in the sect and introduced a number of things to the sect, such as a sādhu code of conduct for the sādhus, code of respect for mahants, rules of ritual and initiation, and public celebrations, and a dress-code. He barred women renunciants (sādhvīs) to be accepted into the monastic order in the Jaipur area. Furthermore, Muslims and "unclean" castes were no longer allowed at communal meals. A key change involved mahants no longer being recruited from non-Brahmin castes. Jaitam's elevation was marked by a change where holders of the leadership of the sect were only sādhus rather than house-holders, as had been the case before amongst Dadu's relatives. In the early 18th century, the Kachvaha ruler Savāī Jaisingh mandated a rule that leaders of the sect could only be a celibate Brahmin, a rule which was observed until the early 21st century. The cohesive structure of the sect took shape and solidified under Jaitrām's tenure as leader. To ensure Naraina remained the prime seat of the sect, all the other monastic branches based elsewhere paid loyalty to the Naraina seat during the annual melās of the sect. Jaitram's acceptance of state patronage can be seen in-regards to the Marwari court, which bestowed sadāvrat and rāmat grants and sponsored the annual melā at Naraina in 1732. The term Dādūpanth became synonymous with the monastic sub-tradition of the Dadupanthis. The Dadupanthi sadhus during Jaitram's tenure had fifty-two branches divided into six groups, with only the Naga sadhus remaining independent (claiming descent from Sundardās the Elder).

Jaitam's acceptance of royal patronage, despite it damaging the sect's adherence to its original tenets, was continued by his successors. Jaitram was succeeded as mahant of the gaddi by Kr̥ṣṇadev, whose tenure lasted until 1753. During his time, the Jodhpur ruler Abhaysiṅgh bestowed land onto the community at Meṛtā. Kr̥ṣṇadev was succeeded by Cainrām (1753–1780), who was patronized by the receival of charity grants and village-revenue to the Naraina site by the Jodhpur rulers in the 1760's. His successor Nirbhairām (1780–1814) was patronized by both the rulers of Jodhpur and Jaipur.

From the mid-18th century onward, the influence of the Naga sub-tradition of the Dadupanthi sadhus led to the introduction of originally Hindu and Sikh beliefs and practices into Dadupanth, such as veneration of the scripture as a book, Hanuman veneration, popularizing pilgrimages, construction of places-of-worship for the sect (known as dādūdvārās). Thus, the Nagas developed a joint Rājpūt-Sant identity that relied upon state patronage.

In 1827, a wealthy doctor of the Uttarādhā monastic tradition constructed the central temple complex at Naraina.

=== Modern period ===
The 400th anniversary of Dadu was celebrated in 1945. In 2001, Gopāldās became the leader of the sect. He is the first leader of the sect in centuries to not belong to the Brahmin caste as he is a Jat. The 400th anniversary of the nirvana of Dadu was observed from 13–14 March 2004. A Dadupanthi organization is the Akhil Bhartiya Shri Dadu Sewak Samaj. Sahapedia produced a docuseries on the sect in September 2019.

== Beliefs and practices ==
Dadu, who speaks of both separation and unity and the virtues of humility and devotion, believed in a formless divine that can be reached with individual worship and was not restricted on the basis of religious identity. The divine conceptualized by him is one of one-ness, with regards to the soul and Brahma. He advocated for reliance on God and not on religious traditions, admonishing outward religious signs, idolatry, frequenting places-of-worship, pilgrimages, and studying scriptures as inferior to cultivating divinity from within, which is achieved through sumiraṇ (name-remembrance). Unity with God is also achieved via the grace of a guru. Such a meeting between the soul and the divine is known as sanmukh which is not analogous with jīva and Brahman. Dadu does not affirm the absolute identity (atyantābheda) of the jīva with Brahman. Whilst he supported the non-duality of Brahman and the jīva, he did not believe that all differences between the two could be removed. Instead, a state of fearless perfection that is non-dualistic is achieved that is difficult to describe succinctly. It is similar to the Sufi concept of fanā, which involves the erasement of ego by divinity. Dadu advocated for non-sectarianism, with this notion being known as nirpakha or madhi mārga (middle-path), seeking to fuse ascetic and a householder lifestyle together through bhakti (devotion), characterized by self-less service or internal veneration. There is a promotion of fairness for all in the world (a quality known as samatā or samasarasa), including in-regards to caste, which are seen as all equal. Furthermore, a peaceful world is promoted (nirvairī). Religious practices that are empty without devotion are known as kapaṭa (deceit). As per Dadu, the human life is a precious gift as it is an opportunity to achieve unification with the divine, which is the only thing that truly matters. Dadu's beliefs may be interpreted as aligning with that of Rāmānuja, Śaṅkara or of the Viśiṣṭādvaita tradition. Jvala Singh notes similarities with the teachings of Kabir and Nanak. Within the panth, Dadu's teachings were later interpreted by his followers through the lens of Advaita Vedanta, chiefly by Sundardās and Nischaldas. This followed by 20th century editions of the Daduvani by various authors, which utilized Vedanta to interpret the panth.

The essence of the Dadupanthi tradition's teaching is expressed in the second sakhi found within the Dadu Vani: "The supreme being, immanent and transcendent, is my God Nirañjana, Without form, pure – Dādū makes reverence to him." (DāVā. 1.2). Thus, the Dadupanthis believe that the human soul (atman) is the same essence as the supreme being. God, who can take human-shape, is referred to by the monikers Rām, Hari, Nirañjana, Parabrahm, Keśav, Govind, or Satguru. If a person shifts their focus away from the temporal world and realizes the truth that their inner-being is the same as the divine, that is bhakti, which is only achieved through divine-grace rather than rituals. Any person can experience this inner truth if they attempt to do so and it is not limited to only some. Being together in a community of like-minded fellows with a similar aim (satsaṅg) can assist one trying to perform bhakti, which needs to be developed as a skill both individually and communally. The end-result is that a person achieves a fully attained state of bhakti, being completely united with the divine, and ends their rebirth cycle (saṃsāra). Unity can be experienced while alive but irreversible unity can only be achieved after death. Dadupanthis can be divided into two basic categories: renouncers (clergy) and householders (laity). The renunciates blame the birth-death-rebirth cycle on women.

Painting of a Dadupanthi, Fuqara'-i Hind, circa early 19th century

Amongst rituals, Dadu rejected many of them during his life but some ritualized practices have been adopted or developed by the Dadupanth. Some rituals followed are the bhajan, katha or pravachan (discourses or sermons), and communal meals. The scripture of the sect, the Dādūvāṇi, is venerated at temples or homes through the performance of an ārtī. The codex of the Dadu Vani kept at the central Nariana site is taken out on processions. The cenotaphs of past gurus of the sect are venerated with veneration of them believed to have healing, wish-making, fertility-inducing, and miraculous properties. The veneration of cenotaphs may be due to Sufi influence. Similar to how meditation in caves was practiced by the Sants and Nath yogis, Dadupanthi cenotaphs may have a basement-chamber for that purpose. The past gurus of the sect are remembered in the form of a bas-relief of their feet on an inscribed slab. However, recently statues of the past gurus have been made as the Dadupanthi laity may engage in idolatry, which is not explicity criticized by the mahants but the clergy do not engage in the practice. A Dadupanthi greeting that originated as a mantra is: Dādūrām, Satyarām.

== Festivals ==
Historical Dadupanthi celebrations (described as a mahochau or līlā) consisted of food-preparation (bhojana), sermons (kathā), instructions (upadesau), discussions (goṣṭi), kīrtan performances, and auspicious singing (maṅgala gāye). Such festivals were patronized by Rajput dynasties, such as the Rāṭhoṛs and Kachavāhā.

The sect has an annual festival lasting from January-February to February-March, which begins in Amber on vasantpañcamī and ends in Naraina on the occasion of Dadu's birthday on the eighth bright day of phālguna (known as the phāg day), lasting a few weeks. Pilgrimages are conducted at the five sites associated with Dadu's life during this period. The festival is influenced by the Rajasthani holī celebration. Another Dadupanthi festival falling in May-June is held on the date of Dadu's death on the eighth day of the dark half of the month of jyeṣṭha.

== Monastic order ==
Mural of a Dadupanthi ascetic from Udaipur jamāt, Shekhawati, Rajasthan, India

The ideal lifestyle in the sect is that of a nomadic renunciate. There are four monastic branches associated with the sect but all have diminished in influence in recent-times:

- Viraktas (renouncers)
- Uttarādhās (“northerners”)
- Nāgās
- Tapasvīs (ascetics) or khākī viraktas (ash-smeared)

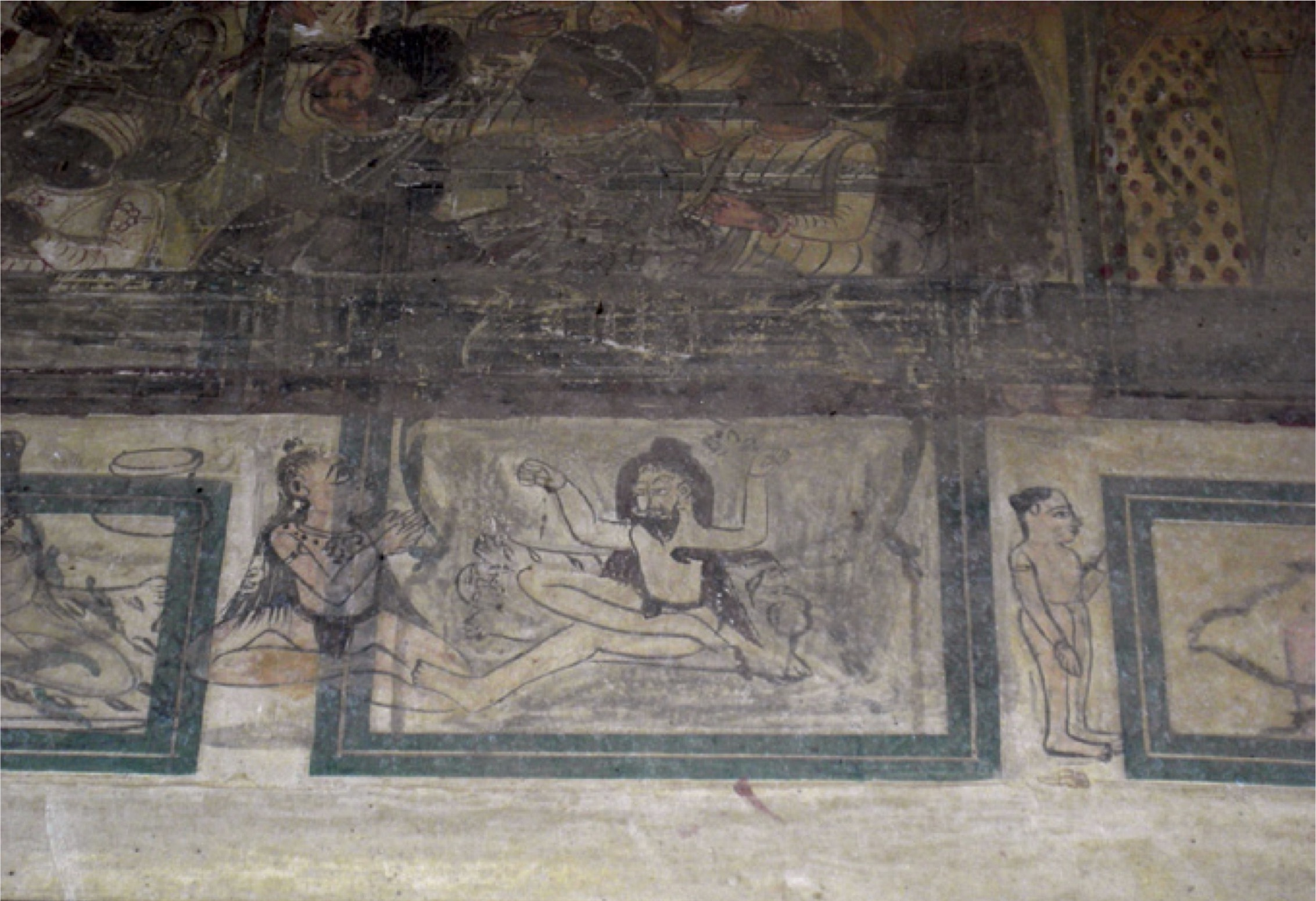
Painting depicting Dadupanthi sadhu ascetics from Mohabat Singh's chatri, circa 18th century.

The different leaders of the sub-orders were arranged specifically for sectarian feasts and gatherings in a set-seating pattern. Dadupanthis of a monastic lineage associated with the central seat at Naraina are known as khālsā (derived from the Arabic word khāliṣa, which was used by the Mughals as a revenue term to refer to "crown-land"), which is not to be confused with the Sikh term. Amongst the Dadupanthi renunciates, male monks are known as a sādhu or nāgās while female monks are known as sādhvī. The renunciates are associated with a particular maṭh (monastery). The monasteries were established along trade-routes of the region. Between the mid-18th century and 1938, the majority of Dadupanthi sadhus were part of the Naga sub-tradition, whom were patronized by the kingdoms of Jodhpur, Koṭa, and Būndī.

However, the monastic order of the Dadupanthis has been shrinking demographically while the number of house-holding Dadupanthis increases. Their numbers have shrunk from 15,000 nāgās in 1875, 5,499 in 1929; and between 3,000–4,000 sādhus in 1945, with there being around 150 sādhus today and some sādhvīs. Some sādhus have made claims on the property of the monastic sub-orders, leading to internal conflict within the Dadupanth. With the decline of the monastic order, the Dadupanthi laity are becoming increasingly prevalent and influential in the community.

=== Viraktas ===
The Viraktas are nomadic monks and nuns that may live alone or as part of a community of monks that are based around a (mahā)maṇḍaleśvar responsible for a certain geographical area. They perform preaching and hold discourses for the general Dadupanthi laity.

=== Uttarādhās ===
The Uttarādhās are a comparatively wealthy section of the Dadupanthis founded by Dadu's disciple Bābā Banvārīdās who settled in Ratia, Hissar district, Haryana, with the branches of the group being based in the region around Ratia. A unique aspect of this lineage is that it consists of gharbārī sādhus who work and live in their own residences. In the local area of Narnaul, married sādhus can be found. They later made a back-migration from the north back to other parts of northern and central India, such as Rajasthan and Madhya Pradesh.

=== Nāgās ===
They are Rajputised martial sādhus who adopted Rajput customs as seen in their literature, that were institutionalized in 1755. Originally interested in literary pursuits, they became militarized by the end of the 17th century due to Rajput influence. They were organized into various military units, known as jamāts (regiments) and thāmbhās (settlements, cantonments), based numerically upon the Vaiṣṇava nāgās (bairāgīs) and saṃnyāsīnāgās. Their martial prowess allowed them to earn wealth, which they used for cultural, musical, literary, artistic, and architectural projects. They claim to originate from a supposed contemporary figure of Dadu named Sundardās the Elder (born Bhim Singh, a martial Rāṭhoṛ Rājpūt of Bikaner), who was a member of the Bikaner dynasty. Some early figures of the sub-tradition were Prahlāddās of Ghatra and Hāpojī (who was related to the Kachvahas of Amber). Prahlāddās was originally the family rājāpurohita of his teacher Sundardās and is responsible for attracting Rajputs to the sadhu tradition. A notable disciple of Prahlāddās was Haridās (originally Hari Singh, younger brother of Mān Singh of Āmer). They initially did not recognize the authority of the central Dadupanthi seat of Nariana but under Jaitram's tenure as the mahant of Nariana, the Dadupanthi nāgās started accepting its authority after it Rajputised. However, they later tried to remove Jaitram as mahant of Nariana and install their own pick. They had loose-connections with the Vaiṣṇava nāgās, such as the Rāmānandīs, Rādhāvallabas, Gauḍīyas, and Nimbārkas. They were especially influenal during the decline of the Mughal empire in the 18th century. They served the Kachvaha kings of Jaipur, with them being responsible for manning outposts, quelling rebellions by tributaries, collecting tax, and other administrative functions. Beginning in 1797 under Pratap Singh of Jaipur, they were paid as soldiers to suppress rebellions and collect tax. In the second half of the 19th century, the Dadupanthi Naga sadhus were organized based upon akhāṛās (regiments). In 1938, the nāgā battallion of Jaipur State was disbanded.

=== Tapasvīs or khākī viraktas ===
They live the idealized lifestyle of a solitary ascetic. They segregate themselves from the other Dadupanthis when at gatherings of the sect. They use cannabis as they believe it allows them to further their spiritual development and obtain spiritual insights. They maintain a sacred-fire, known as a dhūnī, whose ash they smear upon their body.

== Geographic distribution ==
Rajasthan is the Dadupanthi homeland but the sect's followers can also be found in culturally and linguistically contiguous areas of neighbouring areas and regions, such as Gujarat, but also in Punjab, Madhya Pradesh, and Bengal.

== Sites ==
The five places where Dadu lived, namely Sambhar, Amber, Kalyanpur, Bhairana, and Naraina, are considered sacred by the Dadupanthis and are incorporated in the sect's annual festive cycle. The Naraina site is held as the most esteemed amongst the five sites. The head of the Naraina site chooses the successors for the leadership of the other monastic sites but cannot interfere in their local operation or claim their property. Amongst the monastic order, there are various monasteries (known as a maṭh), which vary in-size and grandness. The monastic tradition is especially strong in the Marwar region of Rajasthan, which are supported by daily begging tours to the surrounding localities. The monasteries have a resident mahant and some staff and are usually mostly empty throughout the year except during sectarian celebrations. The monasteries used to be renowned for their kitchen, where food was prepared for visitors in a tradition known as sadāvrat. Places of worship for the sect are known as dādūdvārās.

== Scriptures and literature ==
The Dadupanthis (and the Sikhs) were one of the earliest Bhakti movement traditions to organize their teachings into a written canon (likhe). The Dadupanthis did this between 1600 and 1630, utilizing Dadupanthi, Vaishnava, Sufi, and Sikh sources (such as the Sarvāṅgīs of Gopaldās and Rajab), the verses of Dadu (Dādūvāṇī), and the compilation of songs of five Sants (Dādū, Nāmdev, Kabīr, Raidās, Hardās) known as the Pañcavāṇī. This scripturalization process, influenced by Mughal and Rajput court-culture which emphasized the kitāb (book) medium for knowledge, was motivated by competition between the saṃpradāyas of the Bhaktis, Sants, Naths, Ramanandis, and Shaktas for disciples and devotees, pilgrimage routes and centres, and patronage. This led to more delineated and formal divisions between the various groups by the production of lineages and hagiographies to compete for prestige. The Dadupanthis and Sikhs compiled a scripture around the same time (1604–5) and similarly, both venerated their scripture. Many Dadupanthi literary works survive owing to the climate of Rajasthan and its political stability, the long-standing patronage of Rajput rulers, and the influence of Jainism. Dadupanthi texts exist in both pothī and guṭkā formats, the former used for vernacular scholarly treatises consisting of paratexts written in Sanskrit or pseudo-Sanskrit that emulated the Shastras while the latter format was used as a memory-aid or personal reference notebooks that were portable and used by preachers and singers. The Dadupanthis also created Hindi translations of popular Sanskrit works. Manuscript creation mostly occurring in trading towns where the community received the patronage of the merchant-class.

=== Dādūvāṇi ===
Guṭakā folios containing hymns by Dadu Dayal, Ms. 14362, Rajasthan Oriental Research Institute, Jodhpur, Folios 27b and 28a

Dadu (who was probably illiterate) composed poetry (sākhīs, given during preaching and sermons, which is called kathā and instructions known as upadesau) that consisted of aphorisms and devotional hymns, known as sākhīs and pads. His works were compiled in a corpus known as the Bani ("poetic utterances", Dādūvāṇī which means "speech of Dādū"), which consists of around 5,000 verses, consisting of distichs (sākhīs) and songs (pads). It also known as Anbhaivāṇī ("words of experience"). The works of Dadu started being collected and compiled while he was alive and the Dādūvāṇī was compiled shortly after Dadu's death by his followers (with two direct followers of Dadu attesting to them) utilizing oral traditions from popular verses and by religious singers. The scripture was written in Western Hindi with influences from Rajasthani and other regional lects and also Persian owing to Sufi influences. The earliest manuscript of the scripture is from 1614 while another dates to 1636. The Dādūvāṇī was edited by Rāghavdās and his scribe Mohandās Daftarī by inserting thirty-seven chapters of distichs and 27 chapters of songs into the scripture, with the chapters being assigned a musical mode (rāg). After the song chapters, the scripture closes with the five ārtīs of Dadu to be chanted and not sung included in the rāgdhanāsarī chapter. The work was further edited by Mohandās Daftarī with assistance from Dadu's disciples Rajjab and Jagjīvandās. Mādhavdās of Guler claims the scripture when it was completed was installed and venerated a month after Dadu's death in 1603 but this is likely a claim that arose to rival the Ād Granth (later Guru Granth Sahib) of the Sikhs, which had been installed at Amritsar on 16 August 1604. One of the earliest versions of the Dadupanthi scripture is the Pancvani (Pañcvāṇī, meaning "the words of the five"), which is a collection of the works of Dadu and other sants such as Kabir, Namdev, Ravidas, and Haridas. There exists variant recensions of the Pañcvāṇī. The Dadu Vani is kept at a temple's shrine or in a private home installed on a special niche. Reading or recitation of the scripture is known as bāṃcata and the scripture is also referred to as the vāṇī or guru grantha. Couplets from the scripture are known as sākhīs and are divided by theme. The scripture has multiple printed Hindi editions and select parts have been translated into English by W. G. Orr, K. N. Upadhyaya, and M. Thiel-Horstmann. A scholarly edition of the Daduvani by C. P. Tripathi was published in 1907. It was followed by a 1951 edition by Swami Mangaldas. Another edition was authored by Swami Narayandas.

=== Other texts ===
Dadupanthi hagiographies were written to advance a specific view through narratives, rhetoric, and normatives rather than to document the lives of historical figures factually. They originated as oral stories performed by wandering singers and bhaktas that were later transmitted to writing to be used for preaching as a guṭkā (notebook). Rāghavdās authored a work known as the Bhaktmāl, where he equates Dadu to being among the four founders of the nirguṇa-sampradāyas, namely Nānak, Kabīr, Dādū, and Jagannāth (who was the first mahant of the Nirañjanī sect of Sant Mat, not to be confused with the Daśanāmī Nirañjanīs). Another Dadupanthi writer was Jangopāl, who wrote the Dādū Janma Līlā in c. 1620, a hagiography (parcaī) of Dadu and one of the earliest source on Dadu's life. The Guru saṃpradāya was written by Sundardās. Another hagiographical work is the Sant Guṇ Sāgar, composed by Mādhavdās. An influential Dadupanthui work was the Vicār-sāgar by pandit Niścaldās. In the late 17th century, the Dadupanth was seen as being degraded and degenerating, thus a series of treatises were written aiming to formulize the monkhood and nunhood. Another work is the Bansadīpikā of Mangaldās, written in the 19th century. There is also the Jayatprakāś of Jñāndās, written before 1872.

Amongst non-Dadupanthu works, Dadu is mentioned in a 16th century poem by Eknāth within the Sakal sant gāthā. He is also mentioned in the Gāthā of Tukārām (1598–1650) and in the Dabestān-e mazāheb (mid-17th century).

== Artwork ==
Mural found on the interior dome of a chhatri structure associated with the Dadupanth sect, Rajgarh, Alwar district, Rajasthan, c. 1791–1815

An image of Dadu is usually found near the Dadu Vani at their sites. Most of the current portraits and idealized depictions of Dadu date to the 20th century. Common stories from Dadu's life that are depicted is his encounter with his mystical guru or his meeting with Akbar. The sect creates relief works of footprints to represent its gurus. Recently, statues have been created of past gurus. A depiction of a Dadupanthi can be found in the chapter on Vaishnava sects from the c. 1800 Silsilah-i jogiyān or Fuqarā-yi Hind (BL IO Islamic 3087) by Sītal Singh.

== Leaders ==
Painting of the Dadupanthi mahants Chain Ram (left) and Kishan Dev (centre) together

The mahants (translated to "abbot", also known as a svāmī or ācārya) of the Dadupanthi establishment at Naraina are as follows:

Mahants of Naraina
No.	Name	Date of death (Vikrami and Gregorian)
1.	Garib Das	V.S. 1693 / 1636 C.E.
2.	Miskin Das	V.S. 1705 / 1648 C.E.
3.	Faqir Das	V.S. 1750 / 1693 C.E.
4.	Jait Ram	V.S. 1789 / 1732 C.E.
5.	Kishan Dev	V.S. 1810 / 1753 C.E.
6.	Chain Ram	V.S. 1837 / 1780 C.E.
7.	Nirbhay Ram	V.S. 1871 / 1814 C.E.
8.	Jiwan Das	V.S. 1877 / 1820 C.E.
9.	Dalai Ram	V.S. 1897 / 1840 C.E.
10.	Prem Das	V.S. 1901 / 1844 C.E.
11.	Narayan Das	V.S. 1912 / 1855 C.E.
12.	Udai Ram	V.S. 1931 / 1874 C.E.
13.	Gulab Das	V.S. 1948 / 1891 C.E.
14.	Harji Ram	V.S. 1955 / 1898 C.E.
15.	Daya Ram	V.S. 1988 / 1931 C.E.
16.	Ram Lal	V.S. 2001 / 1944 C.E.
17.	Prakash Das	?
?	Gopal Das	?

== Relationship to other religious traditions ==
The sect shares similarities to the Niranjanis, which also arose in Rajasthan during the same period, and to the Sikhs. The sect is part of the four panths mentioned by the writer Raghavdas in his Bhaktamal version, alongside the Niranjanis, Kabirpanthis, and Sikhs. The Dadupanthis had close relations with the Sikhs, with both religious groups developing around the same time period.

== See also ==
- Dadu, Sindh
