= Sadh (disambiguation) =

The Sadh are a Hindu sect in northern India.

Sadh or SADH may also refer to:

- Sadh Vaishnavism, another Hindu tradition
- Daminozide, a plant growth regulator
- N-succinylarginine dihydrolase, an enzyme
- Amit Sadh (born 1983), Indian actor

== See also ==
- Satnampanth or Satnami, religious movement in Chhattisgarh, India
