= Giraudpuri =

Giraudpuri Giraudhpuri, Giroudhpuri, Giroudpuri, Girodhpuri, Girod, Girodpuri
- village
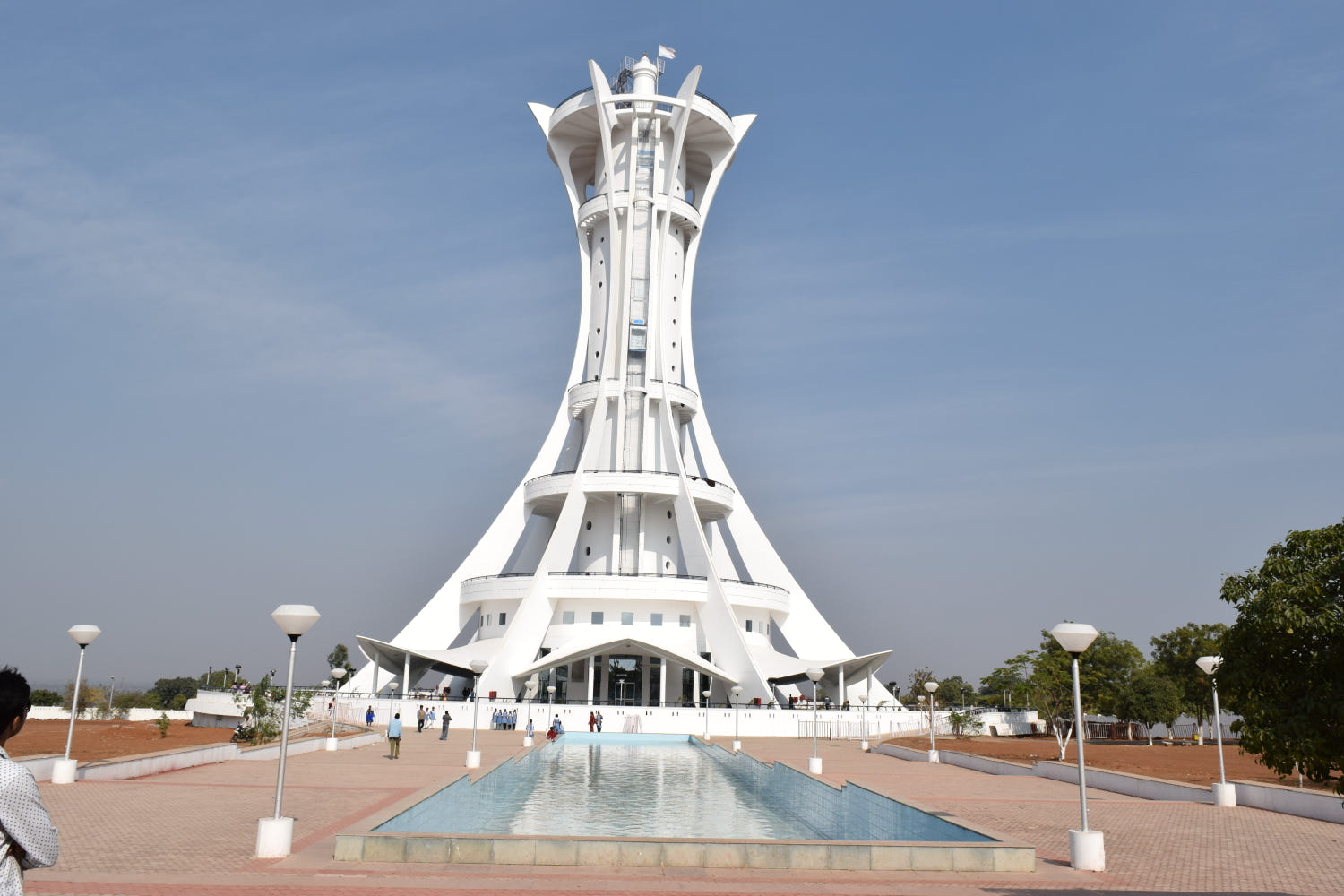
- Guru Ghasidas Jaitkham

- Location in Chhattisgarh, India Giraudpuri (India)
- Coordinates: 21.6116°N 82.5587°E
- Country: India
- State: Chhattisgarh
- District: Baloda Bazar
- Time zone: UTC+5:30 (IST)
- PIN: 493344
- Vehicle registration: CG-

Giraudpuri is a village in the Baloda Bazar district of Chhattisgarh, India. Located beside the Jonk River, it is the birthplace of the Satnami sect's founder Guru Ghasidas, and a pilgrimage centre for the Satnamis.

== History ==
The village is notable as the birthplace of Guru Ghasidas, the founder of the Satnam panth (religious sect). It is a major place of pilgrimage (dham) for the Satnamis. His son Balakdas, purchased land in Girodhpuri to strengthen the Satnami sect. A jayanti mela (birth anniversary fair) held in honour of Ghasidas was first held in Giraudpuri in 1932.

The village was originally known as "Girod". By the time Chhattisgarh became a state in 2000, the Satnamis had become a politically important voting group. The state government renamed the village to "Girodpuri" ("Girod town"), and started developing the area as a tourist centre to generate income, and to gain the political support of the Satnamis. The government built a temple, surrounded by other infrastructure such as hostels, parking areas, and spaces for the makeshift shops and stalls to be set up during the annual mela. The government also developed roads leading to the area, and promoted the site as an important pilgrimage centre of the state. As a result of these efforts, the attendance at the mela increased from around 20,000 in 2001 to more than 500,000 in 2008.

In 2022, the INC-led Chhattisgarh government announced that the village would be renamed to "Baba Guru Ghasidas Dham Giroudpuri".

== Tourism ==
The main landmark of the village is Guru Ghasidas Jaitkham, a 77 metre high tower used as a pilgrimage centre by the Satnamis. A jaitkham ("victory pillar") is a Satnami object of worship, and a symbol of their distinct sectarian identity. It is also known as Jaithkham, Jaitkhambh, Jait Khamba, Jait Khamb, or Jai Stambh. The Jaitkham at Giraudpuri was commissioned by the BJP-led Chhattisgarh government, and constructed by a Kolkata-based firm as an earthquake-resistant structure. The project was scheduled to be completed in 2007 at a cost of ₹ 17 crores, but was completed in 2015 at a cost of ₹ 51.43 crores. In 2010, while questioning the government on the delay and the cost overruns, the opposition INC leaders alleged that the tower was originally planned to be 122 m high, but the BJP government denied this. When Chief Minister Raman Singh inaugurated the tower on 18 December 2015, it was said to be the tallest concrete structure in India. Visitors can climb the tower up to 65m taking the spiral stairs or elevators. At its centre, the structure has a conference hall with a capacity to hold 2000 people.

Charan Kund, sacred pond, is another pilgrimage site in the village. Amrit Kund, a pond whose water is said to be sweet, is located a kilometre from the village. The annual Giraudpuri Mela (fair), also known as the "Guru Darshan Mela", is held at the village.
