= ASTB =

ASTB may refer to:

- N-succinylarginine dihydrolase, an enzyme
- Anyone Seen the Bridge?, an instrumental music piece by the Dave Matthews Band
