= Uda Das =

Early Satnami figure and teacher of Bir Bhan

Uda Das (died 1669), also known as Uddhava Bairagi, was an early Satnami religious figure. (Note: His name is alternatively spelt as 'Udhodas' or 'Udai Das'.) He was the spiritual teacher (guru) of Bir Bhan, who is credited with founding the first Satnami movement. Uda Das was the disciple of Ravidas. As per Sadh lore, Uda Das preached in six places and established a chauki at them, including at Kasli. Bir Bhan received a divine message from Uda Das and became his disciple, with Bir Bhan considering Uda to be a satguru. Uda Das was executed under Aurangzeb's orders in 1669, along with two Rajput disciples.
