= Sunderdas =

Medieval Indian saint, philosopher, and poet

Sant kavi Sunderdas
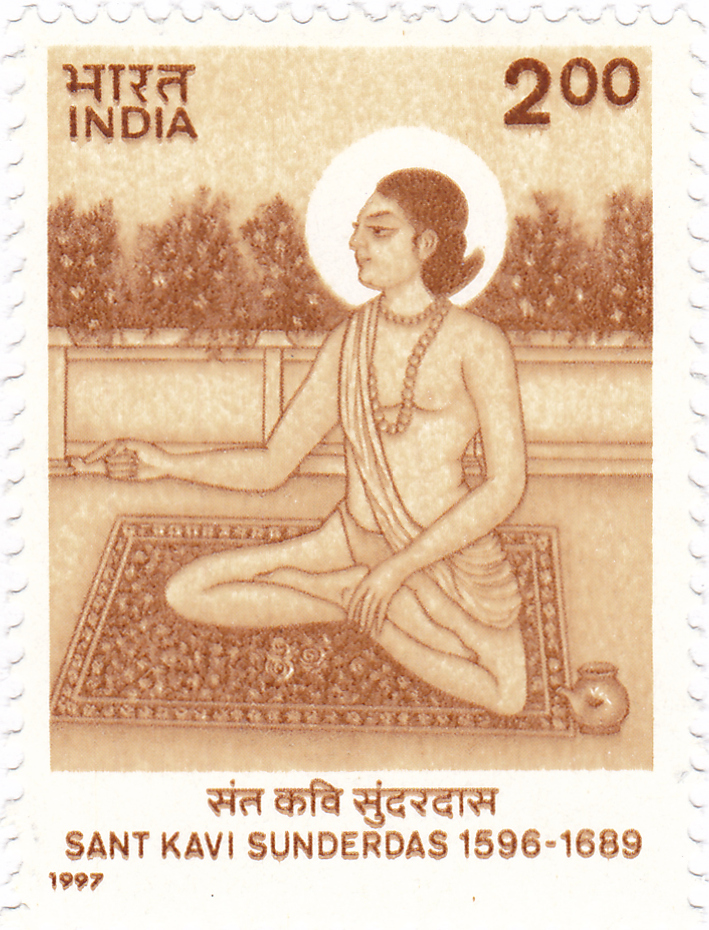
- Sunderdas on a 1997 stamp of India
- Born: 1596; Dausa, Rajasthan, India
- Died: 1689 (aged 92–93)
- Other name: Sunderdas
- Occupations: Saint, poet, philosopher, social reformer
- Known for: Sankaracharya of Hindi literature
- Notable work: Author of about 48 books including “Sunder Vilas”

Sunderdas (1596–1689; Sundardās) was a noted saint, poet, philosopher and social reformer of medieval India. He was a disciple of Dadu Dayal. Sunderdas was born in 1596 in Dausa in Rajasthan state in India. Sant Sunderdas composed about 48 books. He is revered as the "Sankaracharya" of Hindi literature, and is popularly known as Sant Kavi Sunderdas. Raghavdas referred to him as the "second Śaṅkarācārya". He studied Sanskrit, the Purāṇās, and Vedānta while at Benaras. After returning to Rajasthan, he initiated a Vedānticization of the Dadupanth after the death of Dadu by combining Dadupanthi tenets with Sanskritic traditions.
