= Nischaldas =

Hindu saint and writer

Title-page and cover illustration of a lithograph print of the Vichar Sagar work by Nischaldas, written in Punjabi (Gurmukhi), Yantra Mustafai, Lahore, ca.1880–81. A depiction of the author is shown.

Nischaldas (born Agari or Angari; c. 1791 – 1863), also spelled Nishcaldas (1791-1860 or 1792–1863; Niścaldās), was a 19th-century Indian philosopher and teacher of Advaita Vedanta. He wrote many books on Vedic themes, the most popular of which is Vichara Sagar, an important work on the advaitaphilosophy. He was associated with the Dadupanthi tradition and was responsible for the second-phase of Vedanticization of the tradition. Becoming initiated as a renunciate of the Dadupanth as a child, he studied Sanskrit at Benaras under pandits and later authored the Vicāra Sāgara and Vṛtti Prabhākara treatises.

He is best known for his Hindi-language work Vichar Sagar ("The Ocean of Inquiry"), one of the few major expositions of Advaita Vedanta written in a vernacular language rather than Sanskrit during his era. In addition to Vichar Sagar, he authored Vrutti Prabhakar ("The Illuminator of Vruttis") and Yukti Prakash ("The Light of Analogical Reasoning"). He taught for much of his life at an ashram in Kihadauli, near Delhi, and numbered the king of Bundi, Ram Singh, among his disciples.

== Early life ==
Nischaldas was born in Kidholi village of Kharkhoda tehsil Sonipat district of present-day Haryana, in 1791 or 1792. Other sources claim he was born in Dhanana village. His family belonged to the Dahiya gotra of Jats. His mother died when he was young, and around the age of 13 or 14 he moved with his father to Delhi, where his father sought work. In Delhi, the two stayed at a local centre (ashram) of the Dadu Panth, whose head (mahant) was impressed by the boy's intelligence and initiated him into the Panth, giving him the name Nischaldas.

== Education ==
After his initiation into the Dadu Panth, Nischaldas was sent to Banaras for studies. When he arrived in Banaras, he claimed to be from the Brahmin caste to circumvent any discrimination on his pursuit of knowledge. In Banaras he studied the Vedas, Sanskrit grammar (vyakarana), Sankhya, Nyaya, and Advaita Vedanta under various pandits.

One of his teachers, impressed by Nischaldas's intellect and appearance, wished for him to marry his daughter. When Nischaldas revealed that he was not actually a Brahmin, the teacher cursed him to suffer a daily fever. To relieve himself of the affliction, Nischaldas studied Ayurveda to cure himself. To this day, followers of the Dadu Panth practise Ayurveda. His growing reputation as a pandit also provoked jealousy among his peers, and after some twenty to twenty-five years in Banaras, he returned to Delhi.

== Teaching ==
After leaving Banaras, Nischaldas settled in Kihadauli, a small village west of Delhi, where he established a Dadu Panth ashram and taught Vedanta, Nyaya, and Sanskrit grammar. He reportedly preferred to begin each day teaching texts affirming the existence of the atma, reserving texts representing opposing, non-Vedantic and Nyaya views for later in the day.

Around 1843, Nischaldas's reputation had grown to the point that Ram Singh, the King of Bundi, invited him to his palace to learn Vedanta from him. In a Sanskrit letter to Nischaldas, Ram Singh wrote that "Your fame in the Vedanta shastras had reached my ears and I am always eager for such instruction. Nischaldas travelled to Bundi and remained there for a significant time. During his stay, Ram Singh initiated a philosophical debate at court between Nischaldas and several pandits, which Nischaldas won; both Ram Singh and his wife subsequently became his disciples.

At the end of his life, Nischaldas had two or three resident disciples and five to seven additional students who studied under him without formal affiliation, indicating that he taught both within and outside the Dadu Panth.

== Works ==
Nischaldas is known to have published three works, all in Hindi: Yuktiprakash (Yuktiprakāś), Vichar Sagar (Vicārsāgar), and Vrutti Prabhakar (Vṛttiprabhākar). Composing philosophical works in a vernacular language, rather than Sanskrit, was unusual for the period.

Several unpublished works are also attributed to him, including glosses on the Isha and Katha Upanishads. At the likely request of Ram Singh, he also wrote manuscripts on the Kena Upanishad, the Mahabharata, and Ayurveda.

=== Vichar Sagar ===
Vichar Sagar ("The Ocean of Inquiry") is regarded as Nischaldas's most significant work. Written in Hindi at Kihadauli, likely over an extended period, it synthesizes the teachings of numerous Vedanta texts within the framework of Advaita Vedanta across seven sections. The work frames its philosophical content within a narrative of three brothers who renounce the world to receive instruction from a guru, and covers topics including metaphysics, epistemology, theology, cosmology, philosophy of language, and meditation. Nischaldas regarded the text as a handbook to liberation. Vichar Sagar has since been translated into numerous languages, including Gujarati, Marathi, Bengali, Urdu, Kannada, Tamil, Telugu, English, and eventually Sanskrit.

Despite its prominence during Nischaldas's lifetime, the text is not widely known today, because its Hindi is difficult for readers educated in the standardized Hindi of the later nineteenth century. Some scholars have also noted a prejudice holding that liberating knowledge can only be conveyed through Sanskrit, which has contributed to the work's neglect.

=== Vrutti Prabhakar ===
Vrutti Prabhakar ("The Illuminator of Vruttis") is a more technical prose work intended to resolve doubts that might arise from reading Vichar Sagar. Its first six chapters address each of the six pramanas (means of knowledge) accepted in Vedanta, while the final two chapters offer a critical survey of Vedantic philosophy, including cognition, theories of error, the relationship between jiva and ishwara, and liberation. For every topic, the text presents the Nyaya position, distinguishes it from the Mimamsa view, and evaluates both from the standpoint of Advaita Vedanta. Ram Singh is credited with encouraging Nischaldas to write the work.

=== Yukti Prakash ===
Yukti Prakash ("The Light of Analogical Reasoning") is a short Hindi text explaining the axioms of Vedanta through a dialogue between a teacher and a student, illustrated with examples and supported by scriptural references. It is believed to have been composed after both Vichar Sagar and Vrutti Prabhakar.

== Death and succession ==
Nischaldas spent his final years teaching and writing at his ashram until his death in 1863. His funeral rites were performed on the banks of the Yamuna River at Nigambodh Ghat in Delhi, attended by thousands. He was succeeded by one of his senior disciples, Dayaram.

== Legacy ==
Nischaldas's lineage continued at Kihadauli, where his texts were preserved, until at least the early twentieth century. In the decades following his death, Vichar Sagar was translated into languages including Sanskrit, English, and Tamil, and has remained in print in India.

== Bibliography ==
- Allen, Michael (December 2017). "Greater Advaita Vedanta: The Case of Nischaldas". International Journal of Hindu Studies. 21 (3).
- Pahlajrai, Prem. Nischaldas and his Vrttiprabhakar: Advaita Vedanta in the Vernacular (PhD dissertation). University of Washington.
- Pankaj, A. P. N. (January 2010). "Vedanta: A North Indian Perspective". Prabuddha Bharata. 115 (1): 129–137.
