= Ghasidas =

Hindu Satnami religious leader (1756–1850)

Guru Ghasidas
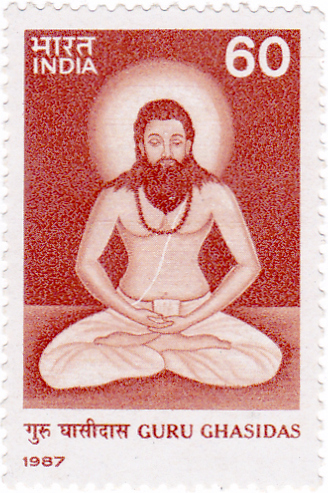
- Guru Ghasidas on a 1987 stamp of India
- Born: 18 December 1756; Girodpuri village, Baloda Bazar district, Chhattisgarh, India
- Died: 1850 (aged 93–94)
- Monuments: Giroudpuri dham - ChataPahad, Jaisatamb 77 m, Bandar His House and Chatwapuri Kadwa Puri, Dhamkeda, Borsaradham, Kukda, Amartaapu etc are Satnami sect sacred places
- Other names: Satguru, Satnam satpurush, avtari baba, guru ghasidas
- Successor: Guru Amardas, Guru Balakdas,Guru Adgadhiyadas, and Guru Aagerdas
- Spouse: Safura Mata
- Children: Guru Balak Das, Guru Amar Das, Guru Aager Das, Guru Adgadhiya Das, Mata Sahodra
- Parent(s): Mahangu Das, Mata Amarautin

Guru Ghasidas (18 December 1756 – 1850) was a guru of the Satnami movement, a saint, and a scholar from Chhattisgarh who was active in the early 19th century. Ghasidas preached in a deeply forested part of Chhattisgarh. He was the founder of the Satnami movement of Chhattisgarh, founded sometime in the first half of the 19th century, perhaps specifically between 1820–1830. He was succeeded as guru of the sect by his son Balakdas.

== Biography ==
Ghasidas was born on 18 December 1756 in Giroudpuri village of chattisgarh (present-day village of Giraudpuri at Baloda Bazar in Chhattisgarh) into Satnami sect, which mainly consists of Chamar dalit hindus. Guru Ghasidas was the son of Mahangu Das and Amrautin Mata. Ghasidas preached Satnam particularly for the people of India starting form mainlands of Chhattisgarh. It's a total divine beauty that no really know about his death he is said to be In Samadi and still forging ways of people till date because only his sons and late Satnami Gurus Cementaries where found. Guru Ghasidas, his teachings were carried on by his Elder son Guru Amardas Saheb and younger son, Guru Balakdas (known as Balidani Raja Guru Balakdas). Guru Ghasidas is the founder of the Satnami community in Chhattisgarh and also Satnam religion and preached Satnam Dharma all over India. His birth is said to chosen by him through permission of the Godfather - Satpuraspita and he decides to embrace the most exploited caste and following previous preaches of Satnam and people facing serious exploitation following the evil caste system. Ghasidas experienced the evils of the people mind since early age, following the prospect of miserable life of people which helped him to understand the social dynamics and reasons of political favours in a caste-ridden society and rejecting social inequality. To find solutions, he travelled extensively across Chhattisgarh and India.

Guru Ghasidas established Satnami community in Chhattisgarh based on "Satnam" (meaning "Truth") and equality. Guru Ghasidas created a symbol of truth called Jai Stambh or Jaithkamb– a white painted log of wood, with a white flag on the top. The structure indicates a white man who follows the truth "Satnam", is always steadfast and is the Pillar of Truth (Satya Stambh). The white flag indicates peace.

Ghasidas, similar to the predecessory Satnami preachers, promoted monotheism, the usage of the term Satnam, and rejected any icon or idol worship. However, Ghasidas also promoted vegetarianism (also preaching against consumption of "flesh-like fruits" such as eggplant), using brass utensils instead of clay, and spoke against usage of intoxicants (drinking alcohol and smoking or chewing tobacco). Ghasidas promoted the wearing of a necklace of beads made from tulsi (similar to Vaishnavites and Kabirpanthis). Ghasidas also wanted the community to reject their traditional occupational roles involving leather and carcasses. Furthermore, Ghasidas requested his followers to stop using any caste-identifying/associated names and adopt the title "Satnami" in their names instead. Ramdas Lamb hyposized that rejecting the veneration of popular deities allowed the low-caste Satnamis to not be constrained by the restriction on the entry of untouchables into temples.

When Ghasidas died, his following may have been around 250,000 persons who mostly all belonged to a single scheduled caste. Ghasidas was succeeded as leader of his Satnami movement by his son Balakdas. There is a shrine, known as Jaitkham, located at the birthplace of Ghasidas near Giraud village in Baloda Bazar district.

== Monuments ==
- The Government of Chhattisgarh renamed a part of Sanjay-Dubri Tiger Reserve after him, that is Guru Ghasidas National Park.
- They also opened a Central University called "Guru Ghasidas Vishwavidyalaya."
- A shrine known as Jaitkham marks his birthplace located around 5 km from Giraud village in Baloda Bazar district, Chhattisgarh, India.
