= Satnampanth =

Indian religious movement

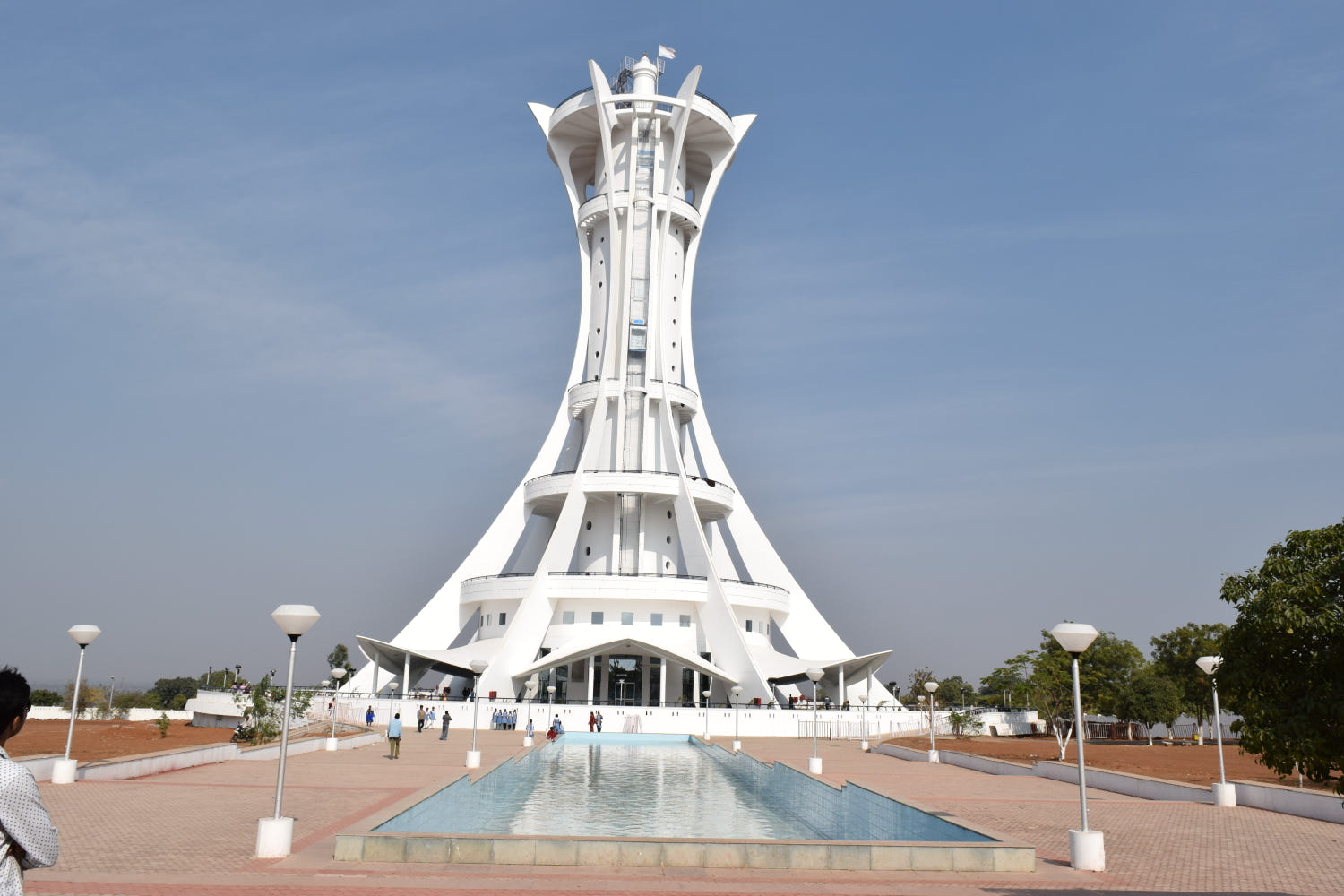
- Jaitkham site dedicated to Ghasidas in Giraudpuri, Chhattisgarh, India
- Type: Panth
- Classification: Hinduism
- Governance: Guru
- Founder: Bir Bhan
- Origin: 21 April 1657; Narnaul, Delhi Subah, Mughal Empire (present-day Haryana, India)
- Separations: Sadh

Satnampanth, also called Satnami Samaj, Satnami movement, or Sadhanpanth, are terms used to refer to various Indian religious and sectarian movements. It was influenced by Kabirpanth. The Satnami movement was connected to Dalits. The first Satnami movement was established by Bir Bhan in 1657 in Narnaul. The movement was noted for a peasant-rebellion in 1672 against the Mughal Empire. Another was associated with Jagjivan Das near Lucknow. Another prominent, later Satnami movement was established by Ghasi Das in 1820 in Chhattisgarh, which is known as Sadh. Historically, they were found in Punjab and Uttar Pradesh. Today, they mostly can be found in Chhattisgarh and parts of Madhya Pradesh adjoining Chhattisgarh.

== Etymology and nomenclature ==
This sect is named after its Lord, Satnam. The term Satnam was first used by Vaishnava Saint Ramanuja in his Satanaama Stotra. It was later used by Vaishnava Saint Kabir.

Kabir said:

Serve the sadhus, repeat Sat Nam and remain in the company of the guru.

Another verse of his was:

This is the Satguru's message: Sat Nam is the real essence of His being, it is the bearer of the tidings of your liberation.

Satnam is used as a name for males and females, usually Sikhs, though. Satyanam is used as a title, like for companies, such as Satyanam Info Solution and Satyanam Satya Guru B.Ed College .

Satnam is chanted in yoga. Historically, chroniclers have also wrote of them as mundiah (because followers often shaved their heads) and bairagi. The fourth, fifth and ninth Sikh gurus addressed saints of Sikh history as Sadh. For example, in the stanza of the Var of Sorath, the sadh, sant, bhagat, Gurmukh, and Gursikh are mentioned together.

== History ==
=== Origin ===
There were several Indian sects called Satnami, the earliest being one founded by Bir Bhan of the Narnaul district in 1657–1658. The sect has an official foundation date of 21 April 1657. (Note: The Bikrami date for the founding of the sect is V.S. 1714 Baisakh Sudi Dwadashi, Sukarwar.) They became known as Satnamis due to their usage of the term Satnam (naknam) for recitation, which had been a prevalent practice amongst the Sant traditions of India in the 17th century. The Satnamis shaved their heads and their entire body, which is why they were also known as mundiah in early accounts. They were also known as Bairagis, which was a common-term used to describe Vaishnavite ascetics and nirgun bhakti traditions. The various terminology is owed to the fluid manner of the various panths of the Sant movement in 17th century India. The movement was also influenced by the Bhakti movement. Kabir had popularised the term Satnam to refer to the divine. The Satnamis were noted for wearing white-coloured clothing.

Bir Bhan was from the hamlet of Kaunsli in Bijhasar village in Narnaul pargannah. Early 19th century Satnami-Sadh tradition recorded by Western writers claimed that the sect was co-founded by Bir Bhan's elder brother Jogi Das, with Gopal Singh of Bindair being the father to the two men. Bir Bhan's guru was Udhodas (also spelt Udai Das or Uda Das, alternatively known as Uddhava Bairagi), the pupil of Saint Ravidas. Uda Das as per Sadh lore had six places where he preached and established a chauki at, including at Kasli. Uda Das was executed under Aurangzeb's orders in 1669, along with two Rajput disciples. A Haryana Review periodical issue regarding the Satnamis of the age of Bir Bhan, "A Satnami had three attributes: he put on the garb of a devotee, earned money through fair means and did not bear any type of injustice or atrocity." According to Mughal writer Khafi Khan, the Satnamis of Bir Bhan numbered around four to five thousand families, mainly engaging in agriculture and trade. Most of the followers hailed from the low-caste leatherworkers. They rejected ritualism and superstitions, claiming allegiance to Kabir. They did not observe the caste system and its distinctions. They were anti-authoritarian and were against the rich.

=== Satnami revolt (1672) ===
The Satnami revolt occurred in the reign of the Moghul Emperor Aurangzeb. Many Hindus resented Aurangzeb’s strict Islamic policies-which included reviving the hated Islamic Jizya tax (poll tax on non-Muslim subjects), banning music and art, and destroying Hindu temples. The revolt began in 1672 when a Mughal soldier killed a Satnami. Other Satnamis took revenge on the Moghul soldier, and in turn the Moghul soldiers went about repressing the Satnamis.

Owing to their egalitarian, martial, and anti-authoritarian nature, the Satnamis eventually came into contact with the ruling government at the time, the Mughal Empire. The rebellion started over a taxation dispute, as noted by Irfan Habib. A Satnami was engaging in farming work when a Mughal piyada (foot-trooper) guarding the corn-heap began arguing with him, striking the Satnami on their head with a stick. A Satnami mob then attacked the Mughal guard, beating him until he died. The Mughal shiqdar (police chief) of the area tried to arrest the Satnami assailants, which led to a wider rebellion. This minor scuffle eventually led to the Satnamis in Punjab and Haryana in 1672 openly revolting against the Mughal administration over ever-increasing taxation.

The result was that about 5,000 Satnamis were up in arms. They routed the Moghul troops situated in the town, drove away the Moghul administrators and set up their own administration in its place. The Satnami rebels took control of Narnaul and Bairat. The uprising gained the enthusiasm of Hindus in Agra and Ajmer also. Though totally lacking in weaponry and money, the Satnamis inflicted several defeats on the Moghul forces. The contemporary Moghul chronicler, Saqi Mustaid Khan, writing in his work Maasir-i-Alamgiri, expressed amazement as to what came over this “destitute gang of goldsmiths, carpenters, sweepers and tanners and other… artisan castes that their conceited brains became so overclouded? Rebellious pride having found a place in their brains, their heads became too heavy for their shoulders.” This also shows the thinking of Muslim intelligentsia who regard them as untouchables. Amusingly, in contrast, Hindus have greatly respected the Satnamis throughout for their beliefs like prohibition of intoxicants and meat. The resentment of the Satnamis against the Moghul persecution meant that they even enacted revenge by destroying mosques in the area. It was only with great difficulty that any Muslim soldiers could be brought to face the Satnamis, such was the wrath of the Satnamis at the time. It was only when Aurungzeb himself took personal command and sent 10,000 troops with artillery that the Satnamis fell. They put up a brave defense. According to Saqi Mustaid Khan they believed that they were re-enacting scenes from the Mahabharata war. 2,000 Satnamis were slain on the battlefield and many more were slain in pursuit. What followed was an attempt to slay every remaining member of the Satnamis, and destroy all their homes. The remnants of the Satnamis fled in all directions and for a long time were totally disorganized and leaderless.

=== Revival and promulgation ===
After their rebellion failed, the Satnamis may have stopped practicing shaving/removing their head-hair and body-hair due to fears of being easily identitifed in public. The movement was nearly destroyed in the rebellion and only regained significant strength again in the mid-18th century under Jagjivandas in Uttar Pradesh and under Ghasidas in Chhattisgarh.

As per Mughal writers, such as Khafi Khan and Abul Fazl Mamuri, the sect survived the rebellion and continued to be followed by agriculturalists and merchants. The sect was revived decades around 1714, when a community calling itself Sadh or Satnami Sadh sprung up in Panchal Nagar, Farrukhabad, present-day Uttar Pradesh. Nawab Bangash Muhammad Khan of Farrukhabad established the street of Sadhwara Mohalla in the locality for the Sadhs to live, where they continue to reside. Sadhs can also be found in the Jodhpur and Bharatpur regions of Rajasthan, the Jind, Rohtak, Panipat, and Sonepat districts of Haryana, the Bareilly, Kanpur, Saharanpur, Mirzapur, and Muzaffarnagar districts of Uttar Pradesh, and Delhi.

==== Revival under Jagjivan ====
The second revival was again decades later by Jagjivan Das (1670–1761?), a Chandel Thakur, whose guru was Maharaja Vishveshwara Puri. His own chief disciples were Dulanadasa, Gosaindasa, Devidasa and Khemadasa. Jagjivan Das is the second most important Satnami. Due to his spiritual fame, he was met by Emperor Akbar. Swami Dayal lists Jagjivan Sahab as his predecessor and writes:

If in your mind you do not believe what I say, then consult the sayings of Kabir and Guru Nanak. Tulsi's persuasion is just the same, and so is that of Paltu and Jagjivan. These saints I take as my authority, and I witness to what they teach.

==== Revival under Ghasidas ====
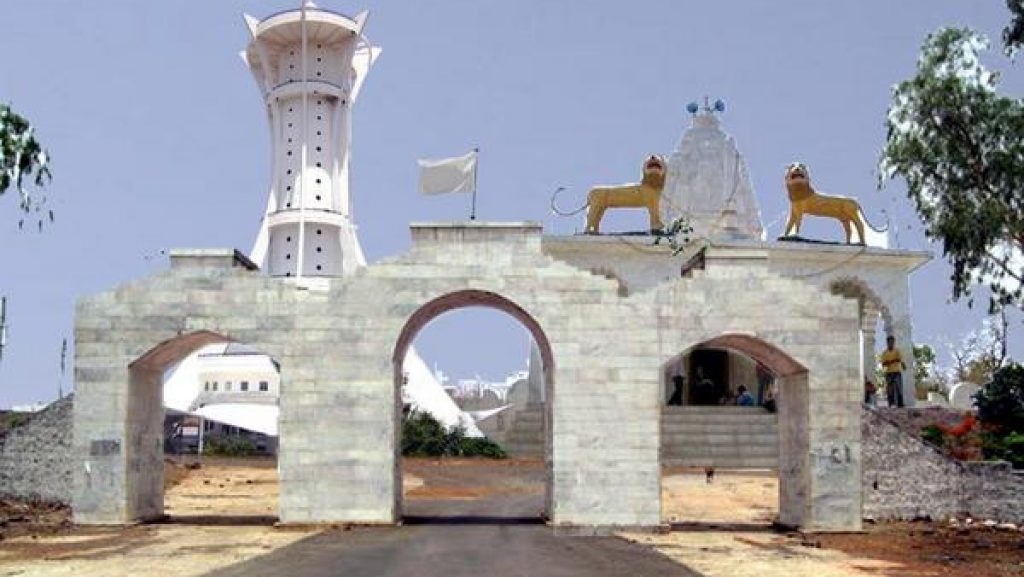
Main gate of Jaitkham, Girodhpuri the birthplace of Shri Guru Ghasidas, the founder of Chhattisgarh’s Satnami movement.

The third revival was by Ghasidas, a Chamar farm-servant, in the 1820s at present-day Chhattisgarh picked up and founded his own offshoot-Satnami sect. His teachings were saved in the Nirvan Gyan scripture, which he wrote. Ghasidas, according to M. A. Sherring, may have been influenced by the teachings of Ravidas, a disciple of Ramananda. Others believe he was inspired by Kabir, through the Kabirpanthis in Chhattisgarh. The Satnami movement originating in Madhya Pradesh was part of a larger Dalit movement of Chamars to set up their own panths that were inspired by Bhakti movement-era saints, such as Ravidas and Kabir. The Dharamdasi branch of the Kabirpanthis had been active in the Chhattisgarh region.

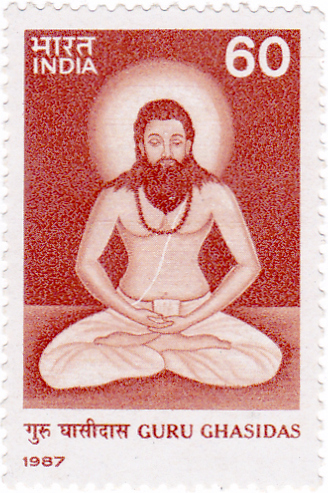
Ghasidas depicting in a 1987 stamp of India

Ghasidas, similar to the predecessory Satnami preachers, promoted monotheism, the usage of the term Satnam, and rejected any icon or idol worship. However, Ghasidas also promoted vegetarianism (also preaching against consumption of "flesh-like" fruits and vegetables such as tomatoes, chillies, red-pulses, and eggplant), using brass utensils instead of clay, and spoke against usage of intoxicants (drinking alcohol and smoking or chewing tobacco). Ghasidas promoted the wearing of a necklace of beads made from tulsi (similar to Vaishnavites and Kabirpanthis). Ghasidas also wanted the community to reject their traditional occupational roles involving leather and carcasses. Furthermore, Ghasidas requested his followers to stop using any caste-identifying/associated names and adopt the title "Satnami" in their names instead. Chamars who joined the movement discarded their former caste identity and took-on a new Satnami identity. Ramdas Lamb hyposized that rejecting the veneration of popular deities allowed the low-caste Satnamis to not be constrained by the restriction on the entry of untouchables into temples. The Satnamis of Ghasidas had no temples and rejected idolatry, with their deity being formless, known as Satnam (meaning "true name"). Ghasidas is believed to have discarded idols of the Hindu deities into the garbage.

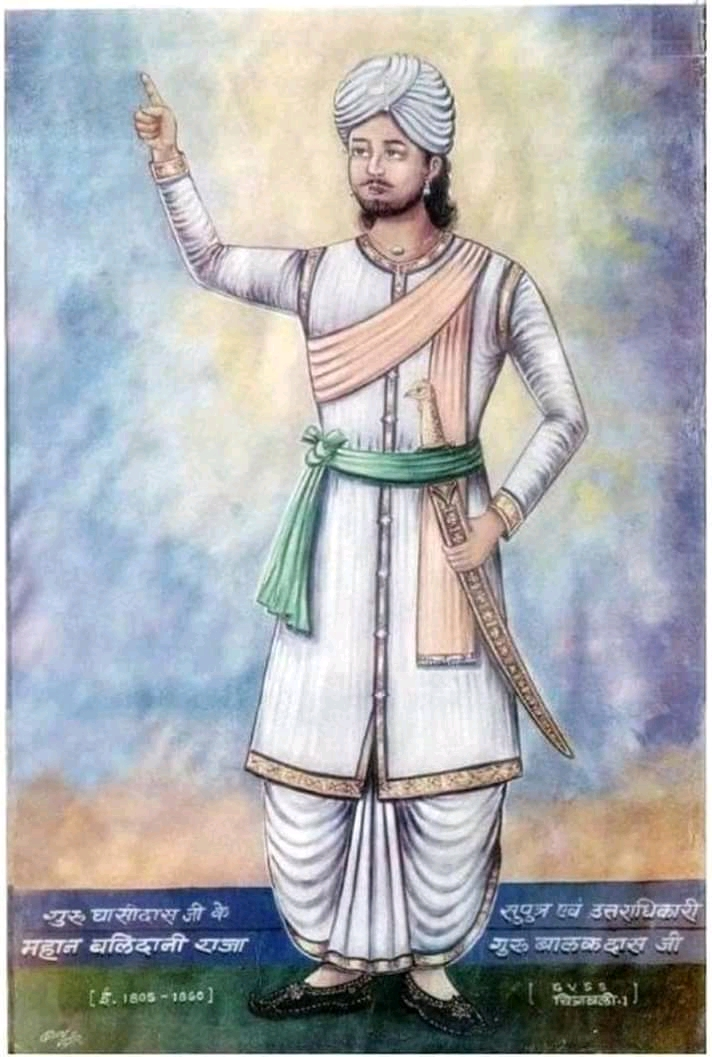
Balakdas, son and successor of Ghasidas

When Ghasidas died, his following may have been around 250,000 persons who mostly all belonged to a single scheduled caste. Ghasidas was succeeded as leader of his Satnami movement by his son Balakdas, thus began a hereditary guru parampara tradition of the Satnamis. There is a shrine, known as Jaitkham, located at the birthplace of Ghasidas near Giraud village in Baloda Bazar district. In the 1850s, Balakdas distributed the janeu sacred-thread to the Satnamis to challenge casteist traditions, as the Satnamis had traditionally been barred from wearing it owing to their low-caste origin and lineage.

=== Colonial period ===
In the early 19th century, Christian missionaries believed the Sadhs of the Meerut region were susceptible to Christianity due to their rejection of traditional Hindu beliefs and practices. In the late 1860s, Evangelical missionaries led by Oscar Lohr also tried to preach Christianity to the Satnamis of Chhattisgarh by claiming Jesus was the "true name" (satyanam). In 1868, Lohr visited the guru of the Satnamis in Bhandar on the occasion of their annual-festival and was seated next to the Satnami guru. While initially the Christian missionaries were received with curiosity and warmly by the Satnamis, they later became antagonistic to them after Lohr baptized some Satnami converts and asked them to remove the janeu (sacred-thread) that the Satnami guru had given them, which upset the sect. However, some Satnamis did end-up converting to Christianity, especially at Bisrampur and Ganeshpur. The Christianity that arose in Chhattisgarh became influenced by Satnampanth. Satnami oral traditions were repurposed by the Christians to appeal to the Satnamis by incorporation elements of a Christian story. A Christian work that incorporated Satnami elements to promote Christianity was the Satyanami Panth aur Shri Gosain Ghasidas Girodvasi, which claimed that Jesus had been prophesized by Ghasidas and that Ghasidas' mission led to Christ. Converts to Christianity were ex-communicated from Satnampanth by the movement's leaders. Some Satnami Christians later attempted to become affiliated with the Arya Samaj, which had a very small presence in Chhattisgarh at the time.

The Satnamis adopted the gīt style of Candaini performance, incorporating music into their performance of it with tablas and harmoniums, with the Satnami performances of the epic tends to glorify the villanous character Camar Bathua. In the 19th century, most of the Satnamis in Chhattisgarh were malguzar (village-proprietors) with lower-quality land when compared to the dominant castes and suffered from notions of untouchability due to their Chamar origins. By the late 19th century, practically all the Chamars of Chhattisgarh became affiliated with the Satnami movement. Also by the late 19th century, the Satnami movement had developed two hierarchal levels: at the top of the hierarchy was the guru, below the guru were village priests responsible for marriages, dispute-resolution, punishments, and acting as intermediaries. They also began to take on more Hindu beliefs and practices, such as the veneration of Hindu deities, eventually seeing themselves as part of Hinduism. Some Satnamis also claimed to be Rajputs or Brahmins by caste-lineage. A Satnami organization known as the Satnami Mahasabha helped consolidate the group's identity, with the organization being dominated by a Maharashtrian Brahmin named Baba Ram Chandra, who was a Hindu nationalist. In 1920s, the Satnami Mahasabha was founded and worked to reform the Satnamis and engaged in nationalistic politics. In the 20th century, Chandra re-wrote the Satnami history under a Brahminical lens in his works Ghasidasji ki Vansavali and Satnam Sagar. In Fiji, a local Satnami chapter was founded by Baijudas. According to Dube, the Satnami movement lasted from 1780 to 1950.

=== Present ===
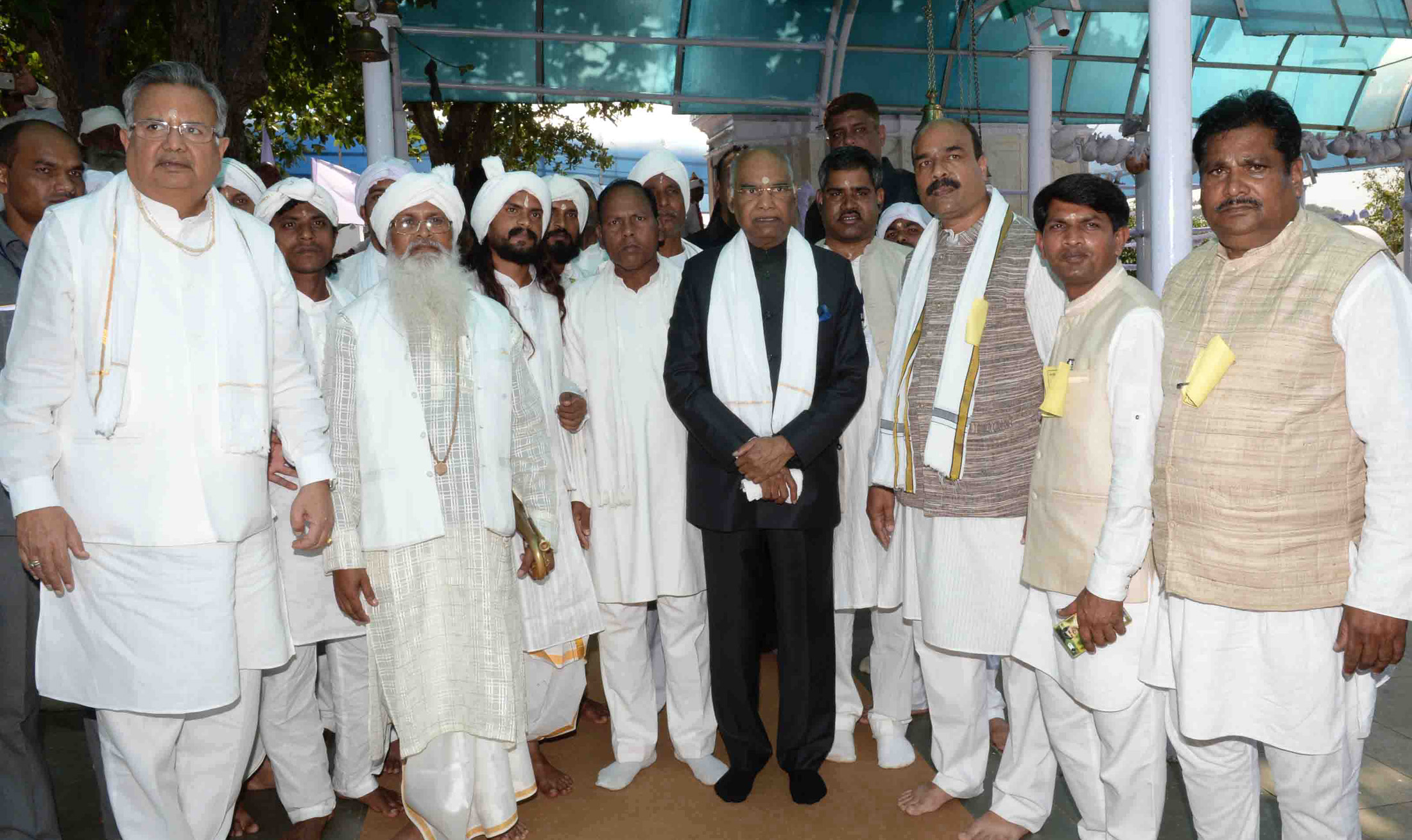
The Indian President, Shri Ram Nath Kovind visiting the Satnami temple of Guru Ghasidas Jaitkham for the Bhoomi pujan of Saamudayik Bhavan, at Girodhpuri, in Chhattisgarh on November 06, 2017. The Chief Minister of Chhattisgarh, Dr. Raman Singh and other dignitaries are also seen.

In 1950, the Satnami guru Agamdas was elected in Chhattisgarh as part of the Congress party, which according to Ghanshyam Shah was a mark of the Satnamis joining mainstream Hindu society. The spouse of Agamdas was Minimata Agam Dass Guru, who was also an elected politician. The Satnamis remain politically dominant in Chhattisgarh, mostly allying themselves with the Congress Party until 2013, now their political allegiances are divided upon various political parties. Around 85% of the Chhattisgarhi Satnamis are Chamars. Most members of the sect work as agricultural labourers, share-croppers, or as tenants.

== Beliefs and practices ==
=== Identity ===
The Satnamis regarded themselves as distinct from Hinduism. They also shed their caste identity as Chamars. Thus, they identified solely as Satnamis. Most of the Satnamis come from Scheduled Caste backgrounds.

=== Worship ===
In venerating Satnam, Satnamis chant Satnam three times. Apart from Satnam, worship is also offered to Ramachandra and Hanuman [whom Satnamis refer to as Mahabir.] In fact, incense is burnt to Hanuman. Satnamis celebrate Dussehra and many also take a pilgrimage to Bhandar for the festivity.

=== Commandments ===
The practices of Satnamis differ in terms of observed rules, because some forbearances given by Bir Bhan were followed by Ghasidas and are still followed by Ghasidas' followers, such as wearing or tilaks and rosaries, and practicing meditation. Worshiping gods in addition to Satnam is also practiced by followers of Ghasidas.

==== From Sant Bir Bhan ====
Bir Bhan issued edicts in his Adi Updesh.

1. There is one Sat Purush - Satnam.
2. Humility and modesty, elimination of ego and pride.
3. No backbiting. Use your tongue only to recite His Name. Do not let your eyes fall on improper objects, nor on women, dances, shows and worldly me.
4. Only hear the praise of God. Listen to no evil discourse, no tales, no gossip, no calumny, not even music, except hymns.
5. Non-covetousness. Trust in God who is the giver of everything you.
6. Never mention your caste when asked who you are. Only declare yourself as a Sadh.
7. Wear white garments, no pigments, nor colyrium, or henna (mehndi), or any tilak, nor chaplets, or rosaries or jewels.
8. Take no intoxicants and smell no perfumes. Never bow your head to any idol or man.
9. Complete nonviolence in thought, word, and deed. No damnatory evidence be given.
10. Marry only one. No man should touch a woman's leavings, but a woman may of a man's.
11. Live as a householder, not as mendicant. No acceptance of alms or gifts. The company of sadhus is the only pilgrimage.
12. No superstition as to a day, or lunation or month or the cry of an animal or appearance of a bird or any other sign or mark be observed.

==== From Jagjivan Das ====
- Worshipped the divine in nirguna (“devoid of sensible qualities”) form
- Self-discipline was the main way of worship of the divine and by use of the “true name”
- Discussed Hindu deities in his works
- Did not talk about the elimination of caste

==== From Sant Ghasidas ====
1. Worship Satnam, as formless without any shrines.
2. Abstain from meat and alcohol.
3. Use brass utensils for cooking and eating.
4. Abstain from smoking/chewing tobacco.
5. Abstain working from leather and carcasses.
6. Abstain using cows for plowing.
7. Wear kanthi (necklace) of beads made from tulasi.

== Symbolism ==
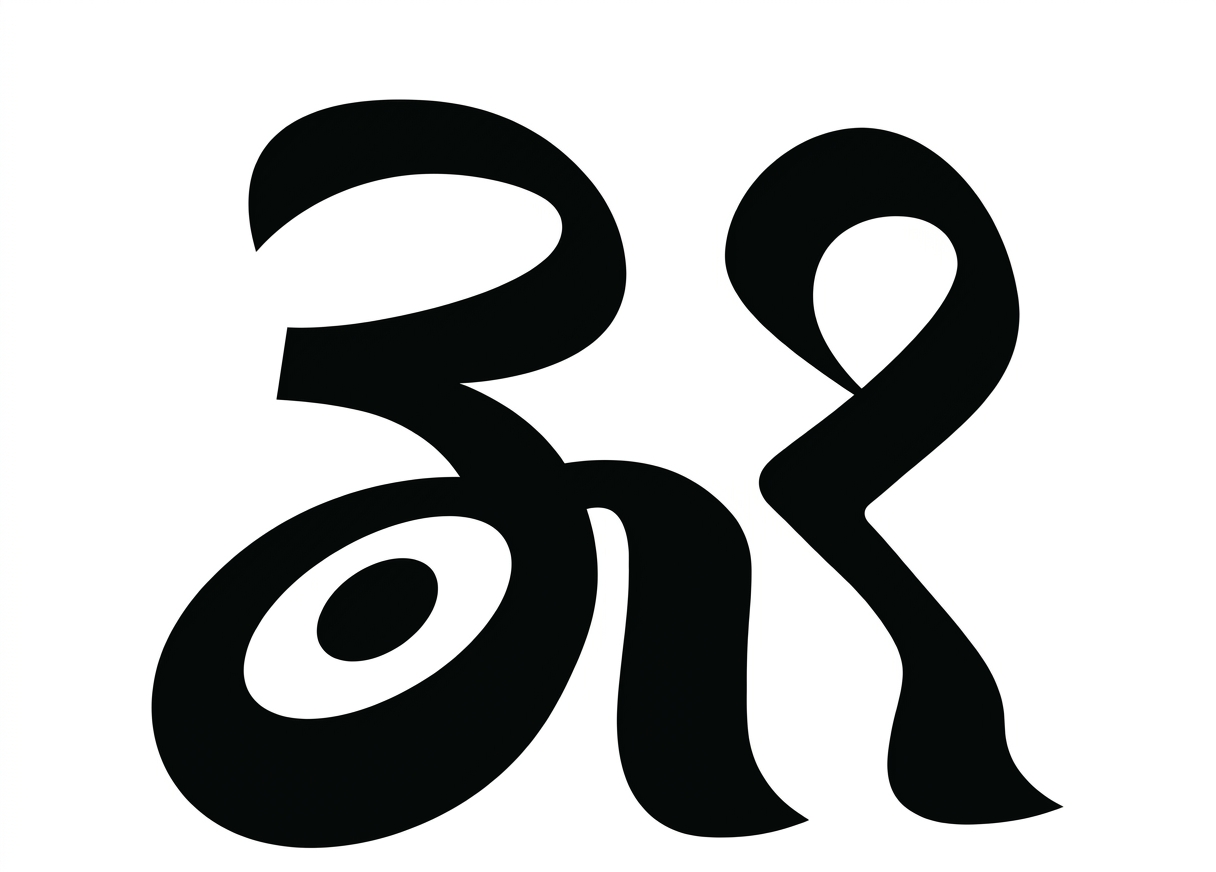
Symbol of the Satnami religious movement

The Satnamis have a sect mark of a straight line down the forehead drawn with ashes from an offering to Hanuman.

== Literature ==
Satnami poets were active in the 16th and 17th centuries. Various bani works are associated with the Satnamis. Two works are linked to the sect: the Gyan Bani and the Nirvana Gyan. The Gyan Bani is older than the Nirvana Gyan based upon internal evidence. The Gyan Bani teaches that beards should not be kept, promotes shaving of the head, but makes an exception for women, believing that women should keep their hair. The Sadhs have a work known as Amrit Bani, which has at-least two volumes. A ballad titled Brahm Prakash covers the Satnami conflict with a Qazi of Delhi. There is also the 17th century Sadh work Sarbangi by Rajjabdas.

== Sects and divisions ==
Although Satnamis claim there were at-least sixty-five Satnami-related movements, only three or four are known in detail or can be currently corroborated. They are as follows:

- Satnamis of Narnaul: the earliest movement, linked to Bir Bhan and Udai Das in the 17th century (founded 21 April 1657)
- Satnamis of Barabanki: the movement of Jagjivan Das of Sardaha (born 1682)
- Satnamis of Chhattisgarh: the movement of Ghasidas founded between 1820–1830

=== Relation to the Sadh sect ===
The Satnamis' relation to the Sadh sect of Farrukhabad is unclear and disputed. The Sadhs also use the name Satnami to refer to themselves (often combined as Sadh-Satnami or Satnami-Sadh), use the term Satnam to refer to the divine, and their traditions trace their origin to the Narnaul Satnamis of the mid-17th century. They no longer use the terms Bairagi or Mundiah to refer to themselves. Some British writers and Christian missionaries in the 18th and 19th centuries, such as Henry Fisher, W. H. Trant, H. H. Wilson, and William Crooke, described the Satnamis and Sadhs as distinct albeit related religious sects. George Abraham Grierson in the early 20th century was the first Westerner to propose that the Sadhs shared a lineage from the Satnamis. S. Nisar Haider Zaidi agreed with Greirson's observation. W. L. Alison in his 1932 work The Sadhs disagrees with any claim that the Sadhs are related to the Satnamis. As per Alison, the conflation arose due to similar nomenclature and it was possible that some Satnamis converted to the Sadh movement while retaining their former descriptor. Alison further observed that the contemporary Sadhs of his era rejected any connection to the "vulgar" and "low-caste" Satnami movement. Abha Singh criticizes this comment as present-day Sadhs affirm a connection to the Satnamis and their anti-Mughal rebellion, with an entire ballad contained in their Amrit Bani covering the Satnami rebellion. According to Abha Singh, the Sadhs were founded by surviving remnants of the Satnamis who moved eastward after their rebellion.

== See also ==
- Chamar
- Ravidassia
- Ad-Dharmi
- Madiga
- Chambhar
- Jatav
- Ramnami
