= Raghavdas =

Dadupanthi writer

Rāghavdās was a Dadupanthi writer. He belonged to the lineage of Haridās of the Naga Sadhus of the Dadupanthis. He composed the Bhaktmāl in 1660 or 1720, a hagiographical work that was influenced by a work of the same name by Nabhadas. The text covers fifty-two direct disciples of Dadu and many later Dadupanthi disciples. It is also the earliest extant work covering the life of Kabir. His Bhaktamal version mentions four panths (a parallel to the four sampardayas mentioned in Nabhadas' version) that practice nirgun bhakti, namely the Dadupanthis, Kabirpanthis, Niranjanis, and Sikhs.
