= Guru Balakdas =

Raja Guru

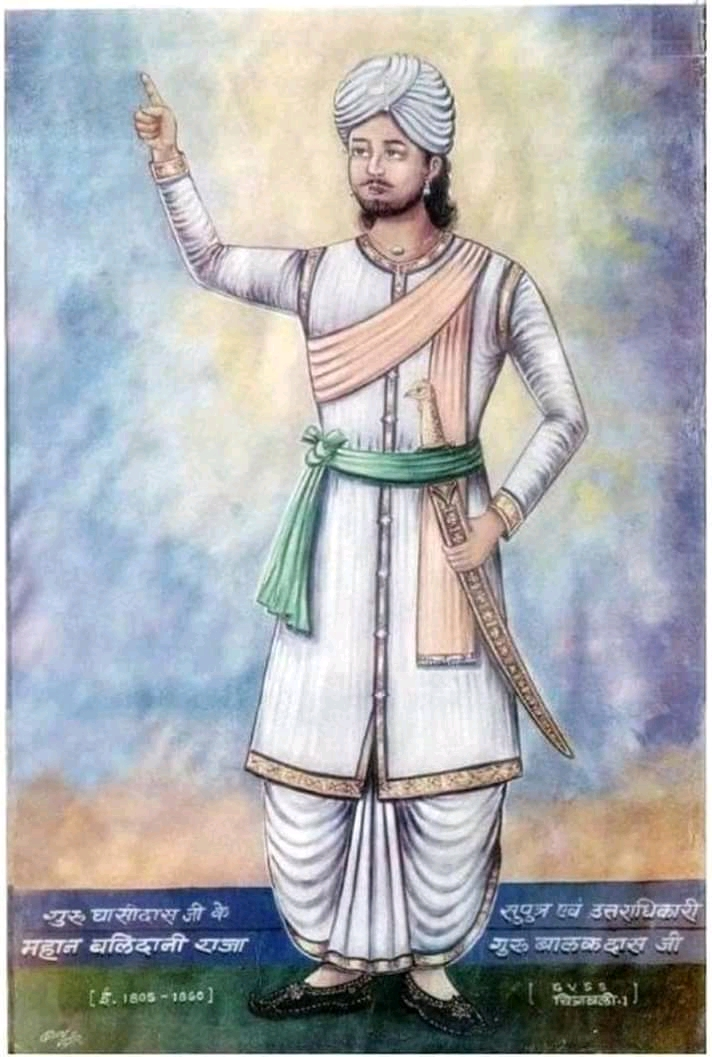
- Born: 18 August 1805; Giroudpuri, Chhattisgarh, India
- Died: 17 March 1860 (aged 54); Kosa, Bemetara, Chhattisgarh, India
- Cause of death: He was attacked by hired assailants at a rest-house in Aurabandha and died on the way to Nawalpur at Kosa.
- Known for: Satnami Movement
- Spouse(s): Neera, Radha
- Children: Sahebdas
- Parent(s): Guru Ghasidas, Safura Mata

Guru Balakdas (Born 18 August 1805 - Died 17 March 1860) was a great revolutionary, social reformer, man of the era and the chief propagator of the Satnami movement for human rights and the second son and successor of Guru Ghasidas, the founder of Satnam Dharma. Guru Balakdas Ji was the chief commander of the Satnami movement. Due to his important role, after Guru Ghasidas, he was made the chief Guru of the Satnamis in 1850. After taking over the leadership, Guru Balakdas Ji carried forward the Satnami movement with full momentum as before.

== Birth ==
Guru Balakdas Ji was born on 18 August 1805 in Giraud village in Chhattisgarh, India, as the son of Guru Ghasidas Ji and Safura Mata. Guru Balakdas Ji had an elder sister Sahodra Mata and an elder brother Guru Amardas.

The thoughts of Guru Ghasidas Ji had influenced him since childhood. Therefore, when the Satnami movement started in 1820 AD, Guru Balakdas Ji contributed greatly to it and played a leadership role.

== Marriage ==
Guru Balakdas Ji was married to Neera, daughter of Sunhardas Chaturvedi, a resident of Dhara Nawalpur (Bemetara) and sister of Saheb Bhujbal Mahant Ji. Later Guruji also married Radha, daughter of Chiter Silwat. From Guru Balakdas and Radha, their son Sahebdas Ji was born. And from Neera, two daughters named Ganga and Galara were born.

== Satnami Movement ==
The Satnami Movement was a multi-dimensional revolt that arose on the soil of Chhattisgarh in the first half of the 19th century (especially between 1820-1830) under the leadership of Guru Ghasidas. It was not just a religious reform movement, but a powerful democratic revolution against casteism, feudalism, British imperialism and gender oppression. Guru Balakdas Ji made an important contribution to the Satnami movement, started the Akhada practice in the society for self-defense and created a powerful armed Satnam Sena which protected the common people from the Maratha exploiters. He went from village to village, set up Rawti (meetings) and propagated Satnam, due to which people of many castes became Satnami. Guru Balakdas Ji used to ride an elephant and a horse, the elephant's name was Dulrwa and the horse's name was Sanwal Mani.

== Bodyguards ==
The names of the twelve main personal bodyguards of Guru Balakdas Ji are as follows, 1. Sarha, 2. Jodhai, 3. Lallu, 4. Jagdhar, 5. Amarsingh, 6. Gulali alias Gulli, 7. Shobhit, 8. Patanga, 9. Veersingh, 10. Rajai, 11. Chanda and 12. Barati. Among these twelve bodyguards, Sarha was given the responsibility of the chief in Guru Balakdas Ji's personal security squad. Guru Balakdas Ji had so much faith in the talent, courage and martial arts of these bodyguards that despite there being trained Khadaits in almost every Satnami family and village at that time, he did not take much precaution and effort for his security.

== Guru Balakdas Ji's tenure after 1850 AD ==
After the demise of Guru Ghasidas Ji, there was discussion in the Satnami organization-society on the question of who would be the leader of the Satnam movement. Since Guru Ghasidas had emphasized on society's importance instead of individual importance. After serious discussion in the society, it was decided that in building the strength of the society-organization along with Guru Ghasidas to run the Satnam movement, his second son Balakdas had equally provided leadership. Therefore, he should be made the Guru chief. For the leadership of the society, efficiency and leadership ability will be considered as the basis. Not any lineage tradition. This decision was taken on the basis of work efficiency, not under any lineage.

== Guru Balakdas and Veer Narayan Singh ==
Guru Balakdas Ji's influence was also on the tribals. He had friendly relations with the tribal leader of Sonakhan, Veer Narayan Singh. Veer Narayan Singh had included trained soldiers of the Satnam Sena established by Guru Balakdas in his armed fighters.

== Malik Makbuja Law ==
In 1857, there was a military revolt in India against the East India Company. Which was completely failed by the army of the East India Company. After this, the British government took over the rule of India from the hands of the company. To rule in an organized manner, *Malik Makbuja Law* was implemented. Under which it was decided to give ownership rights after survey to those tenants who were cultivating their lands since 1840. During the Satnami movement, the people of Chhattisgarh had regained their land properties snatched by the Peshwai Marathas. Almost half of the plain area was occupied in proportion to its population [the population of Satnamis was half in the plain areas of Chhattisgarh]. With the new law, Satnamis would have legal rights over all those land properties.

== Raja Guru ==
There was also a provision in the Malik Makbuja law, that if there is any dispute, then the opinion of the recognized head of that area will be given importance while taking a decision. Guru Balakdas was considered as his Guru and head by half the population of the plains. Due to the new legal provision, his status had become like that of a judge or a king, therefore the common people called him *Raja Guru*.

== Conspiracy to murder Guru Balakdas Ji ==
The Malik Makbuja law created a stir among the casteist feudal forces. Because they knew that once the names of the real owners of the lands were recorded in the government documents, they could not be evicted. They could not take any action against the Satnamis as long as Guru Balakdas Ji was there. No one in Chhattisgarh had the courage to even look at him with a crooked eye. Therefore, the feudal elements conspired nationally to murder Guru Balakdas Ji. Criminal type people from outside Chhattisgarh were told that a man has to be murdered in Chhattisgarh, and thousands of acres of land here have to be occupied. Outside criminals were called to Chhattisgarh and given military training.

== Murder of Guru Balakdas Ji ==
Guru Balakdas Ji handed over the responsibility of looking after the Bodsara Bada-Bilaspur to one of his trusted bodyguards and left for Ramat. After a few days, Rawti was organized in Aurabandha-Mungeli. In which Guru Balakdas Ji went. On the night of 16 March 1860 AD, Guru Balakdas Ji was taking night rest in village Aurabandha, 8-10 kilometers away from Mungeli district headquarters of present-day Chhattisgarh state of Central India, when suddenly a group of hundreds of armed people attacked him with the intention of killing him. The security squad deployed in security took the front against the attackers, for many hours at night their bodyguards gave a befitting reply to the attackers. Guru Balakdas himself also fought them bravely. The attackers had attacked in a planned and organized manner targeting Guru Balakdas Ji. All the bodyguards including Sarha and Jodhai, the head of Guru Balakdas's security squad, fought the attackers with their full capacity and war skills. Since the number of enemies was very high and their target was only Guru Balakdas. The attack was done many times, Guru Balakdas was injured while fighting. The attackers had to suffer a lot of loss. So in the end they had to flee, all the fighting Khadaits gathered at one place. They wanted to take Guru Balakdas to Bhandarpur, the administrative headquarters of the Satnami movement, and they started taking him from Aurabandha towards Bhandarpur. After going some distance, the spies informed that it would not be appropriate to take Guru Balakdas to Bhandarpur because there is a rumor that the people present there do not want to see Guru Balakdas Ji there in any condition, alive or dead. The people of the security squad were surprised because no one expected that the information about the incident in Aurabandha would reach Bhandarpur so quickly and that there would be a negative reaction from there. Apart from this, no one was made the head of the Satnami movement while Guru Balakdas Ji was alive, then who and with what authority banned the entry of Guru Balakdas Ji into Bhandarpur from Bhandarpur. The security squad changed the route to Bhandarpur and started going to another important center of the Satnami movement, Nawalpur (a place 6 kilometers near the present Bemetara district headquarters). But 8 kilometers before reaching Nawalpur, in a village named *Kosa*, on 17 March, seriously injured Guru Balakdas Ji died. The bodyguards gave this information to Saheb Bhujbal Mahant, another great hero of the Satnami movement present in Nawalpur.[tour][meeting]

Saheb Bhujbal Mahant himself along with his Khadaits reached Kosa and brought the dead body of Guru Balakdas Ji to Nawalpur. Here the Satnami agitators gave him a final salute. After that, his dead body was buried with honor. In this way, Guru Balakdas Ji was martyred on 17 March 1860 AD while fighting against the casteist feudal elements for the protection of human rights, bread and honor of the common people throughout his life.

== Situation after the martyrdom of Guru Balakdas Ji ==
After the murder of Guru Balakdas Ji, Agardas was made to sit on the Gurugaddi from Bhandar, he did not support the Satnami community organization in the murder of Guru Balakdas Ji and contemporary circumstances. Rather, he did various anti-social acts by occupying the supreme institution of Satnam-society organization and its property. Due to which the Satnamis had to suffer fatal consequences.

After a few years, the only son of Guru Balakdas Ji, Sahebdas Ji, also died under suspicious circumstances, he was childless, there was a disputed partition between Sahebdas and Agardas.

After the martyrdom of Guru Balakdas Ji on 17 March 1860 AD, the oppression of Satnamis started. Those who had regained their land and property during the time of Guru Ghasidas, Guru Balakdas, and had built an egalitarian society by abandoning the ideology of inequality. Thousands and thousands of acres of land and property of Satnamis came into the possession of the oppressors by oppressing them from all sides. The biggest strength of Satnamis, their right over land and wide unity gradually got shattered.
