= Jagjivan Das =

Hindu guru (1727–1761)

Jagjivan Das Sahib
- Title: Sant Kavi

Personal life
- Born: 1670 CE (1720 Vikram Samwat) Sardaha, Modern Day Uttar Pradesh
- Resting place: Kotwa Dham, Barabanki

Religious life
- Religion: Hindu
- Philosophy: Satnam

Sant Kavi Jagjivan Das (1670–1761?), also spelt as Jagiwan Das, was a Satnami religious leader who was the founder of the Satnami denomination of Barabanki. His teachings focused on the divine name, invocation (vinay), and temporal vanity in comparison to love. He was influenced by Sufism, the Nath tradition, and Krishnaism.

== Biography ==
According to Abha Singh, Jagjivan Das was born in 1682 and belonged to Sardaha and was a Chandel Thakur by caste. Other sources claim he was born earlier in 1670.

He wrote at least a dozen literary works, including Agh Vinaash, Maha Pralay, Gyan Prakash, Shabd-Sagar, Param Granth, Prem-Path, and Aagam Paddhati.
