= Kalyanpur, Rajasthan =

Kalyanpur
- town
- Location within Rajasthan Location within India
- Country: India
- State: Rajasthan
- District: Balotra

Area
  - Total: 2 km^{2} (0.77 sq mi)
- Elevation: 114 m (374 ft)

Population (2001)
  - Total: 5,274
  - Density: 2,600/km^{2} (6,800/sq mi)

Languages
  - Official: Hindi
- Time zone: UTC+5:30 (IST)
- Postal code: 344026
- Vehicle registration: RJ

Kalyanpur is a town in Balotra District, Jodhpur division, Rajasthan. Kalyanpur's population is around 5274.
