= Panth =

Term used in religious traditions in India

Panth (also panthan, meaning "path" in Sanskrit), also called Sampradaya, is the term used for several religious traditions in India. A panth is founded by a guru or an acharya in guru-shishya parampara, and is often led by scholars or senior practitioners of the tradition. With the backdrop of the Sant and Bhakti movements in mediaeval India, the followings of various religious leaders began to take on a "panthic" identity, which was a very fluid label in the 17th century. However, later the panthic identities became structured and distinct, such as the followers of Nanak and Dadu, who became the Nanakpanthis and Dadupanthis. While the term panth is used sometimes interchangeably with the term saṃpradāya, a panth often is used to refer to religious movements from the Sant tradition. Amardeep Singh defines the term as referring to a community of people with the same mindset congregating around a spiritual leader of a certain religious domain.

== List of prominent Panths ==
Some of the major panths in India are:

1. Khalsa Panth (Sikh)
2. Nanakpanth (Sikh)
3. Udasipanth (Sikh)
4. Sewapanth (Sikh)
5. Sahaja Panth (Buddhist and Hindu)
6. Kabirpanth (Part of the Sant Mat)
7. Dadupanth (Part of the Sant Mat)
8. Satnampanth
9. Tera Panth (Jain)
  1. Digambara Terapanth
  2. Śvetāmbara Terapanth
10. Taran Panth (Jain)
11. Nath Panth (Hindu)
12. Varkari Panth (Hindu)
13. Mahanubhav Panth (Hindu)
14. Sat Panth (Sufi, Shia, Islamic)
15. Ravidas Panth (independent religion)
16. Niranjani Panth

== See also ==
- Indian-origin religions

== Bibliography ==
- Kabir and the Kabir Panth by G. H. Wescott, South Asia Books; (July 1, 1986)
- The Bijak of Kabir by Linda Hess and Shukdev Singh, Oxford University Press, 2002
- One Hundred Poems of Kabir: Translated by Rabindranath Tagore. Assisted by Evelin Underhill, Adamant Media Corporation, 2005
- Crossing the Threshold: Understanding Religious Identities in South Asia by Dominique Sila-Khan, I. B. Tauris in Association with the Institute of Ismaili Studies; (November 4, 2004)
