= N-succinylarginine dihydrolase =

Class of enzymes

Identifiers
- EC no.: 3.5.3.23

Databases
- BRENDA: enzyme data
- ExPASy: NiceZyme view
- KEGG: enzyme entry
- MetaCyc: metabolic pathway
- Rhea: reactions
- PDB structures: RCSB PDB PDBe PDBsum
- Gene Ontology: AmiGO / QuickGO
Search
- PMC: articles
- PubMed: articles
- NCBI: proteins

N-succinylarginine dihydrolase (EC 3.5.3.23) is an enzyme characterised from the bacterial complex Pseudomonas cepacia that catalyzes the hydrolysis of N(2)-succinyl-L-arginine to N(2)-succinyl-L-ornithine, with ammonia and carbon dioxide as byproducts:

N(2)-succinyl-L-arginine
2 H_{2}O
2 NH_{3}
N(2)-succinyl-L-ornithine
+ CO_{2}

The reaction is part of the breakdown paathway of the amino acid, arginine, and the genes encoding the enzyme have been studied. The structure of the enzyme in Escherichia coli has been determined by X-ray crystallography. The enzyme has been a target for recombinant protein production.

This enzyme is a hydrolase, one acting on carbon-nitrogen bonds other than peptide bonds, specifically in linear amidines. The systematic name of this enzyme class is N2-succinyl-L-arginine iminohydrolase (decarboxylating). Other names in use include N2-succinylarginine dihydrolase, arginine succinylhydrolase, SADH, AruB, AstB, and 2-N-succinyl-L-arginine iminohydrolase (decarboxylating).
