= Satnām =

Term in Sikhism

Satnām (Punjabi: ਸਤਿ ਨਾਮੁ, lit. 'true name', pronunciation: [sæt̪ näːmɔ]), alternatively rendered as Satyanām, is the main word that appears in the Sikh sacred scripture called the Guru Granth Sahib. The term is also used by the Satnampanth tradition.

== Etymology ==
The term derives from the Sanskrit word satyanaman, meaning “he whose name is truth”.

== Meaning ==
It is part of the Gurbani Shabad called Mool Mantra which is repeated daily by Sikhs. This word succeeds the word "Ek Onkar" which means "There is only one constant" or commonly "There is one God." The word sat means "true/everlasting" and nam means "name". In this instance, this would mean, "Whose name is truth." Satnam is referred to God as the Name of God is True and Everlasting.

The word nam in Sikhism has two meanings. "It meant both an application and a symbol of the All-pervading Supreme Reality that sustained the universe. Guru Nanak in his teachings emphasised the need of repeating Sat-Nam to realise the All-pervading Supreme Reality."

== Usage ==
The term is first linked to Kabir but may predate him. It was adopted as a term by various religious figures of the Sant movement, including Guru Nanak. The term would be adopted and used by the various Satnami movements.
