= Sadh =

Hindu sect in northern India

The Sadh, also referred to as Satnami, are a Hindu community, found mainly in North India, traditionally associated with textile dyeing and calico printing. They are found mainly in Uttar Pradesh, concentrated in Farrukhabad District, with small numbers also found in Saharanpur, Mirzapur, Meerut and Bareilly districts.

== History and origin ==
The term Sadh is derived from sadhu, which means a mediator. The Sadh use the name Satnami to call upon the God. Hence, they call themselves as Satnamis. There are two sub-divisions in the community, the Shamme, and Vidhi. The Shamme are those who strictly follow their religion, while members of the Vidhi division do not adhere religious sanction.

The origin of the Sadh may be traced to an early Satnami sect founded in 1543 CE or 1657 CE by Birbhan of Bijesar, a village near Narnaul, Haryana. Birbhan claimed to be inspired by a student of Ravidas. In the late 1600s, this sect was mostly composed of the lower strata of Hindu society, particularly farmers, carpenters, goldsmiths, etc. They were ruled by the Mughal emperor Aurangzeb, and in 1672 they revolted, only to be annihilated by his army. The surviving members of the sect, or their descendants, may have played a part in the eventual formation of the Sadh in the eighteenth or early nineteenth century.

== Present circumstances ==
The Sadh specializes in printing on colour and silk cloth. The community is now involved in the retail side of this industry. They have traditional caste councils, and in rural areas these councils resolve any disputes within the community. They are an endogamous Hindu community who practice vegetarianism.

== See also ==
- Satnampanth
- Patwa
