= Vairagi tradition =

Hindu Celibate ascetics of vaishnavism

Vairagi
Regions with significant populations
- India

Religion
- Hinduism

Vairagi, also spelt Bairagi, is a Hindu sect who follow Vaishnavism. Celibate ascetics of Vaishnav Sampradaya are called Vairagi or Bairagi. The Bairagis were Vaishnavite mendicants who venerated Rama or Krishna.

== History ==
The Vairagi term was first adopted by vaishnavas of Ramanandi Sampradaya. Later, it became the identity of followers of all four Vaishnava sampradayas.

== See also ==
- Bairagi Brahmin (caste)
- Bairagi (raga)
