= Dadu Dayal =

Indian saint

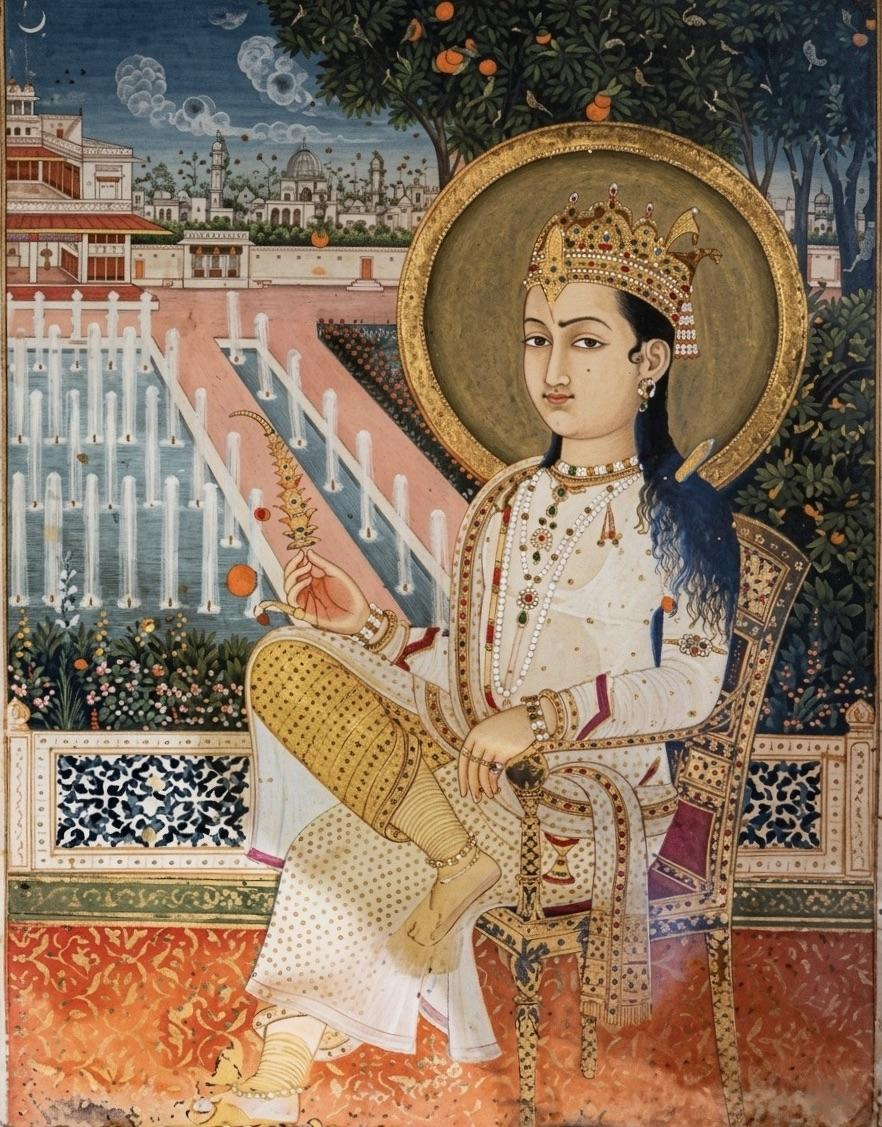
- Painting of Dadu Dayal displayed within the sanctum sanctorum of the Dadu Vani Temple in Amber (Amer), Jaipur district, Rajasthan, India

Personal life
- Born: 1544
- Died: 1603 (aged 58–59) Akoda, Rajasthan, India
- Notable work: Dadu Anubhav Vani

Religious life
- Religion: Hinduism
- Founder of: Dadu Panth
- Philosophy: Bhakti
- Sect: Sant Mat

Religious career
- Teacher: Bābā Būḍhāu

Dadu Dayal (Devanagari: दादू दयाल, Saint Dādūdayāl, 1544–1603) was a poet-saint religious reformer who spoke against formalism and priestcraft, and was active throughout Rajasthan.

== Etymology ==
"Dadu" means brother, and "Dayal" means "the compassionate one". The word Dādū is also a Rajasthani term to refer to a grandfather. Dadu's name may have been a distorted version of Dāūd or a diminutive of Allāhdād, names of Muslim origin.

== Biography ==
Modern painting of Dadu Dayal

There are three main hagiographies on Dādū Dayāl. The Dādūjanmalīlā was written soon after Dādū Dayāl's death by his disciple Jangopāl, and Bhaktmāl was written by Rāghavdās in 1660. There exists a text entitled Sant gun sāgar purportedly written by Mādhavdās during Dādū Dayāl's life, however this is inauthentic and the text in reality likely dates to the early 19th century.

Dādū Dayāl was born into the Piñjārā/Dhuniyā caste, but later sources attempted to portray him as a Brahmin. According to Jangopāl, he was born in Ahmedabad. However, other sources do not attest to this, nor did Dādū Dayāl have any impact on the city during his lifetime. Dādū Dayāl claimed to have received visions from his mystical guru, Bābā Būḍhāu, at the ages of 11 and 18.

In 1573, his son, Garībdās, was born in the town of Sambhar, Rajasthan. His later children include Maskīndās, Havā, and Bāī. According to Jangopāl, his children were born without sexual intercourse with his wife. However, according to Rāghavdās, they were merely his first four disciples.

In Sambhar, Dādū Dayāl claimed to hold debates with orthodox religious figures, and preached a "middle path" between various sects. By 1579, Dādū Dayāl and his four children/disciples moved to Amber. According to the Dādu panthī tradition, Dādū Dayāl visited the court of Akbar on the invitation of Bhagavantdās, Kachvāhā ruler of Amber. He then became increasingly nomadic. He moved to Karaṛālā, Naraina where he received land.

In 1603, Dādū Dayāl died. His body was left in the wilderness, instead of being cremated or buried as per Hindu or Muslim tradition.

== Dadupanth ==
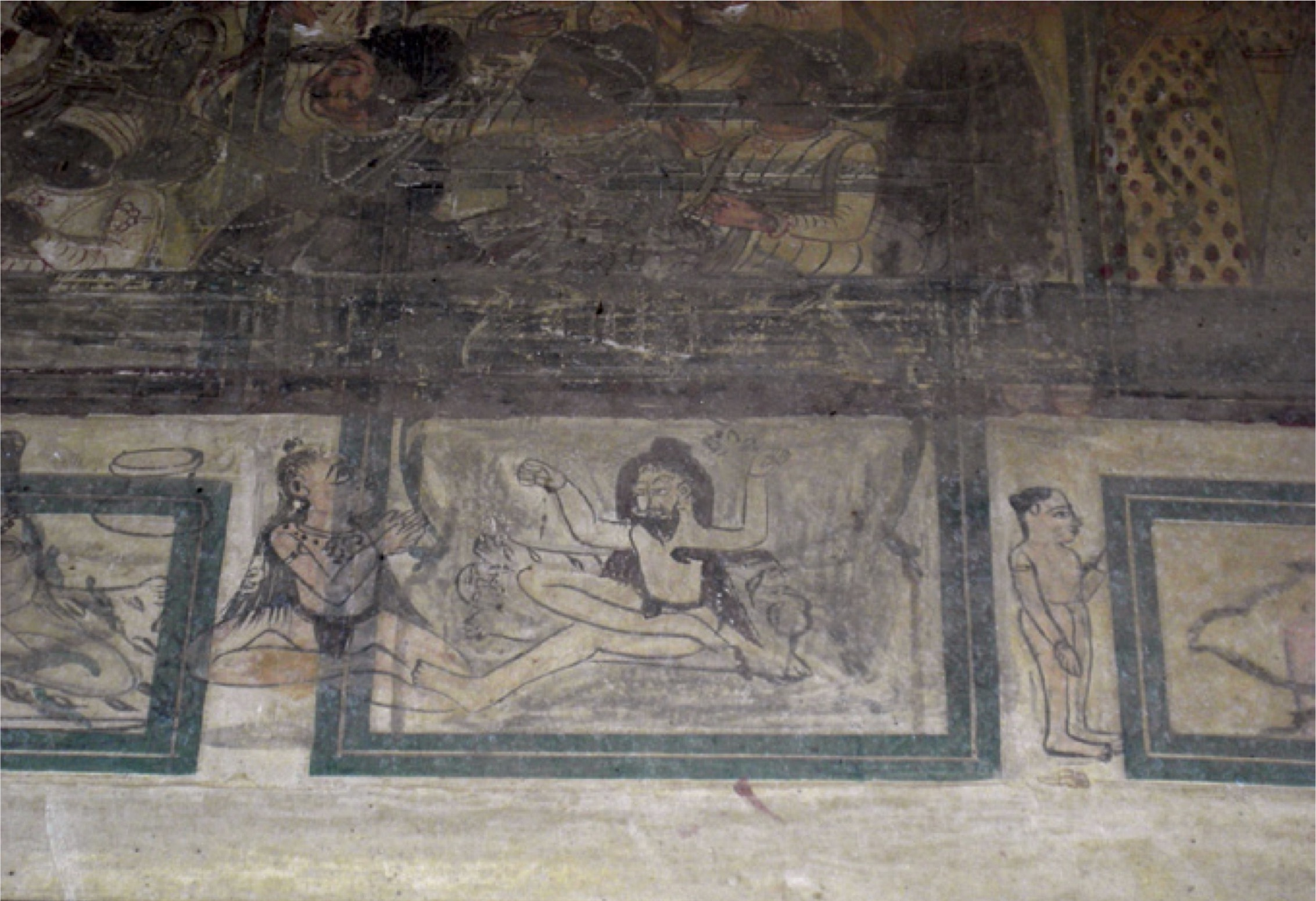
Painting depicting Dadupanthi sadhu ascetics from Mohabat Singh's chatri, circa 18th century

Dadu Dayal later moved to Naraina, near Jaipur, Rajasthan, where he gained a group of followers, forming a sect that became known as the Dadupanth.

Dadupanthis are one of the 7 martial akharas of Vaishnavite sampradaya of Hindus. Vaishnavism has following four major sects:

- Sri, founded by Ramananda. Dadupanthis are one of those 7 martial akharas of Vaishnavite in the sect of Ramanada.
- Brahma. founded by Madhava.
- Ridra, founded by Vishnusuvamin
- Sanakadi, founded by Nimbarka.

Followers of Vaishnavism are also called Bairagi or Vairagi. Among the Bairagi, those who became part of the military akharas were organised in the 7 akharas, of which the founding dates are unclear. Each of the akharas accepted members from all 4 sects of Vaishnavism. Bairagi military akharas generally did not follow the prohibition against eating meat or taking narcotics. The Dadupanthis had a tradition that was known as Khalsa, being inspired by the Sikh tradition.

=== Dadu Anubhav Vani ===
Dadu's compositions in Braj language were recorded by his disciple Rajjab and are known as the Dadu Anubhav Vani, a compilation of 5,000 verses. Another disciple, Janagopal, wrote the earliest biography of Dadu. Dadu alludes to spontaneous (sahaja) bliss in his songs. Much of the imagery used is similar to that used by Kabir, and to that used by earlier Sahajiya Buddhists and Nath yogis. Dadu believed that devotion to God should transcend religious or sectarian affiliation, and that devotees should become non-sectarian or "Nipakh". He said the following about that:

So kāfir jo bolai kāf;
dil apna nahim rakhe sāf...

Translation:

The infidel is one who tells a lie;
One whose conscience isn't
clear...

=== Dadupanthi Thambas ===
Dadu had 100 disciples that attained samadhi. He instructed additional 52 disciples to set up ashrams, 'Thambas' around the region to spread the Lord's word.

Dadu spent the latter years of his life in Naraiana, a small distance away from the town of Dudu, near the city of Jaipur.

Five thambas are considered sacred by the followers: Naraiana, Bhairanaji, Sambhar, Amer, and Karadala (Kalyanpura). Followers at these thambas later set up other places of worship.

=== Dadupanthi Martial Akharas ===
Armed martial akharas were first likely formed by the Dadupanthi Guru Jait Sahib (1693–1734 CE) when he recruited armed Naga sadhus. In 1733, Dadupanthis were tax paying farmers in Jaipur State, and martial Naga Sadhus were employed to enforce the payment of taxes. In 1793, Dadupanthis and Jaipur State had an agreement under which Dadhupanthis provided 5000 armed soldier sadhus to defend the Jaipur State. During the 1857 rebellion, Dadupanthis acted as mercenaries who helped the British Raj.

=== Present status ===
Dadupanth has continued in Rajasthan to the present-day and has been a major source of early manuscripts containing songs by Dadu and other North Indian saints.

== See also ==
- Akhara
- Bhakti movement
- Sampradaya
  - Vaishnavism sampradaya
  - Shaivism sampradaya
    - Dashanami Sampradaya, a sub-sampradaya of Shaivism

== Sources ==
- Callew, Winand M. (1987). "Dadu and the Dadu-Panth: The Sources". In Schomer, Karine; McLeod, W. H. (eds.). The Sants: Studies in a Devotional Tradition of India. Berkeley Religious Studies Series. Delhi: Motilal Banarsidass. pp. 181–190. ISBN 978-81-208-0277-3. OCLC 925707272.
- Dandekar, R. N. (1987) [Rev. ed. 2005]. "Vaiṣṇavism: An Overview". In Eliade, Mircea (ed.). The Encyclopedia of Religion. Vol. 14. New York: MacMillan.
- Lorenzen, David N. (1995). Bhakti Religion in North India: Community Identity and Political Action. New York: SUNY Press. ISBN 978-0-7914-2025-6.
- Nayak, Sujatha (1996). "Dadu Dayal". In Sivaramkrishna, M.; Roy, S. (eds.). Poet-Saints of India. New Delhi: A Sterling Paperback. pp. 90–100. ISBN 81-207-1883-6.
- Sant Dadu Dayal: Encyclopaedia of Saints Series (Volume 25). Eds. Bakshi, S. R.; Mittra, Sangh (2002). New Delhi: Criterion Publications. ISBN 81-7938-029-7
- Upadhaya, K. N. (1980). Dadu the Compassionate Mystic. Punjab: Radha Soami Satsang Beas.
