= Indian diaspora =

Other scheduled languages:
- - Assamese: ভাৰতীয় প্ৰব্ৰজনকাৰী
  - Bengali: ভারতীয় প্রবাসী
  - Bhojpuri: 𑂦𑂰𑂩𑂞𑂲𑂨 𑂣𑂹𑂩𑂫𑂰𑂮𑂲
  - Dogri: भारतीय प्रवासी
  - Gujarati: ભારતીય પ્રવાસી
  - Hindustani: Bharatiya Pravashi
  - Kannada: ಭಾರತೀಯ ವಲಸೆಗಾರರು
  - Kashmiri: 𑆨𑆳𑆫𑆠𑆵 𑆤𑆳𑆥𑆶𑆑
  - Konkani: भारतीय प्रवासी लोक
  - Maithili: 𑒦𑒩𑒞𑒱𑒨 𑒩𑒫𑒰𑒮𑒱
  - Malayalam: ഇന്ത്യൻ പ്രവാസികൾ
  - Marathi: परदेशस्थ भारतीय
  - Meitei: ঈন্দিঅ গি মাযাঙ লেইবাক্
  - Nepali: भारतीय प्रवासी
  - Odia: ଭାରତୀୟ ପ୍ରବାସୀ
  - Punjabi: ਭਾਰਤੀ ਡਾਇਸਪੋਰਾ
  - Sanskrit: भारतीय प्रवासी
  - Santali: ᱵᱷᱟᱨᱚᱛᱤᱭᱟᱹ ᱰᱟᱭᱥᱯᱳᱨᱟ
  - Sindhi: 𑊺𑋠𑋞𑋙𑋢 𑋗𑋣𑋚𑋌𑋢 𑊻𑋠𑋙𑋑𑋢
  - Tamil: இந்திய புலம்பெயர்ந்தோர்
  - Telugu: భారతీయ డయాస్పోరా
  - Bodo: भारतीय प्रवासी
- Flag of India

Total population
- c. ~37 million (2026 est.) (Note: January 2026 Indian Ministry of External Affairs estimate)

Regions with significant populations
- United States: 5,160,203
- UAE: 4,425,144
- Saudi Arabia: 1,884,476–2,594,947
- Malaysia: 2,019,600
- Myanmar: 2,009,207
- United Kingdom: 1,927,150
- Canada: 1,858,755 (Note: 2021 census: Statistic includes all persons with ethnic or cultural origin responses with ancestry to the nation of India, including "Anglo-Indian" (3,340), "Bengali" (26,675), "Goan" (9,700), "Gujarati" (36,970), "Indian" (1,347,715), "Jatt" (22,785), "Kashmiri" (6,165), "Maharashtrian" (4,125), "Malayali" (12,490), "Punjabi" (279,950), "Tamil" (102,170), and "Telugu" (6,670).)
- South Africa: 1,697,506
- Kuwait: 1,152,175
- Oman: 680,000–1,375,667
- Singapore: 812,000
- Mauritius: 804,500–894,500
- Sri Lanka: 802,323
- Australia: 750,000–845,800
- Qatar: 691,000
- Trinidad and Tobago: 468,524
- Nepal: 426,941
- Bahrain: 326,658
- Germany: 301,000
- Guyana: 299,382–315,873
- Fiji: 313,798–315,198
- Réunion (Overseas France): 297,300
- New Zealand: 292,092
- Suriname: 148,443
- Indonesia: 7,251
- Philippines: 70,000
- Jamaica: 91,246–101,100
- Kenya: 80,000–100,000
- Tanzania: 60,000
- Spain: 57,000
- Japan: 66,974
- Brazil: 27,432

Languages
- Hindustani ~43.3% Malayalam ~19.6% Tamil ~12.3% Punjabi ~9.7% Telugu ~5.6% Bengali ~3.1% Gujarati ~2.3% Marathi ~2.2% Kannada ~1.8% Others (2017 est.)

Religion
- Hinduism, Sikhism, Jainism, Buddhism, Zoroastrianism, Christianity, Islam, Baháʼí, Judaism

Indian diaspora (ISO: Bhāratīya Pravāsī), officially Non-Resident Indians (NRIs) and People of Indian Origin (PIOs), are people of Indian descent who reside or originate outside of India, forming a part of the larger South Asian diaspora. According to the Government of India, Non-Resident Indians are citizens of India who currently are not living in India, while the term People of Indian Origin refers to people of Indian birth or ancestry who are citizens of countries other than India (with some exceptions). Overseas Citizenship of India (OCI) is given to People of Indian Origin and to persons who are not People of Indian Origin but married to an Indian citizen or Person of Indian Origin. Persons with OCI status are known as Overseas Citizens of India (OCIs). The OCI status is a permanent visa for visiting India with a foreign passport.

According to the Ministry of External Affairs report updated on 26 November 2024, there are 35.4 million non-resident Indians (NRIs) and People of Indian Origins (PIOs) (including OCIs) residing outside India. The Indian diaspora comprise the world's largest overseas diaspora. Every year, 2.5 million (25 lakh) Indians immigrate overseas, making India the nation with the highest annual number of emigrants in the world.

== Legal framework ==
=== Non-resident Indian (NRI) ===
Strictly, the term non-resident Indian refers only to the tax status of an Indian citizen who, as per section 6 of The Income-tax Act, 1961, has not resided in India for a specified period for the purposes of the Income Tax Act. The rates of income tax are different for persons who are "resident in India" and for NRIs. For the purposes of the Income Tax Act, "residence in India" requires stay in India of at least 182 days in a financial year or 365 days spread out over four consecutive years and at least 60 days in that year. According to the act, any Indian citizen who does not meet the criteria as a "resident of India" is a non-resident of India and is treated as NRI for paying income tax.

Seafarers are not considered NRIs. However, as they work out of India, often for more than 182 days, their income is taxed as that of NRIs while they enjoy all the other rights of a citizen.

=== Person of Indian Origin (PIO) ===
A Person of Indian Origin (PIO) means a foreign citizen (except a national of Pakistan, Afghanistan, Bangladesh, China, Iran, Bhutan, Sri Lanka and/or Nepal), who:

- previously held an Indian passport,
- either of whose parents/grandparents/great-grandparents were born and permanently resided in India as defined in Government of India Act, 1935 and other territories that became part of India thereafter provided neither was at any time a citizen of any of the aforesaid countries (as referred above), or
- is a spouse of a citizen of India or of a PIO.

=== Overseas Citizenship of India (OCI) ===
After multiple efforts by leaders across the Indian political spectrum, a long term visa scheme was established. It is entitled the "Overseas Citizenship of India", and is commonly referred to as the OCI card. The name is itself misleading, as it doesn't offer Indian citizenship. The Constitution of India does not permit full dual citizenship. The OCI card is effectively a long-term visa, with restrictions on voting rights and government jobs. The card is available to certain Overseas ex-Indians, and while it affords holders residency and other rights, it does have restrictions, and is not considered to be any type of Indian citizenship from a constitutional perspective.

Prime Minister Narendra Modi announced on 28 September 2014 that PIO and OCI cards would be merged. On 9 January 2015, the Person of Indian Origin Card scheme was withdrawn by the Government of India and was merged with the Overseas Citizen of India card scheme. PIO cardholders must apply to convert their existing cards into OCI cards. The Bureau of Immigration stated that it would continue to accept the old PIO cards as valid travel documents until 31 December 2023.

=== Comparison ===
Comparison of Resident Indians, NRIS, PIOs and OCIs
Category	Indian passport (Indian Citizen)	Resident in India	Expatriate	Tax status	OCI card	Acts	Notes
Indian (resident)	Yes	Yes	No	Yes	No	Indian nationality law Passports Act	
Non-resident Indian (NRI)	Yes	No	Yes (of India)	No	No	Indian nationality law Passports Act; IT Act, 1961	
Person of Indian Origin (PIO)^{1} / Overseas Citizen of India (OCI)^{2}	No	Yes (in India) else, No	Yes (in India)	Yes (if resident in India) else, No	Yes	Cit. (A) Act, 2003 (Section 7A–D)	lifetime visa / permanent residency

PIOs and OCIs
Foreign national	OCI card eligible	Exception	Acts	Status after attaining OCI
Person of Indian Origin (PIO)	Yes	–	–	PIO OCI
Others	No	Yes, if married to Indian citizen or PIO OCI for more than two years	Cit. (A) Act, 2003 (Section 7A(d))	Non-PIO OCI

Notes:

1. People of Indian Origin (PIO) refers to people of Indian birth or ancestry who are not citizens of India, but are citizens of other nations. Those PIOs who have availed of the Overseas Citizenship of India status through OCI card are known as Overseas Citizen of India (OCI). The card issued to PIOs earlier known as PIO card has been merged into OCI card since 2014.
2. Overseas Citizens of India can include both PIO OCIs and non-PIO OCIs. As additionally foreign nationals who marry Indian citizens can also avail of the OCI card and become OCI, thus Non-PIO OCIs are excluded here since they are not part of the Indian diaspora.

== History of emigration from India ==
=== Central Asia ===
Narimsimhan et al. (2019) have found that there was an "Indus periphery" population living in Central Asia during the Bronze Age. They had migrated from the Indus Valley Civilisation and had settled down in BMAC settlements to trade, this is corroborated by the discovery of Indus Valley seals in Central Asia.

The modern Indian merchant diaspora in Central Asia and Arabia emerged in the mid-16th century and remained active for over four centuries.

Multani people from Multan, Shikarpur and Mawar of both Hindu and Muslim background acted as bankers and merchants in Safavid Iran. Hindu merchants in Hamadan were massacred by Ottoman Empire as stated by an Armenian, with the Indian merchant community plummeting due to the Ottoman and Afghan wars in Iran (1722–27). In Kerman, traders of Hindu background had a caravanserai. Traders of Indian background were mentioned by Jean Chardin, Jean de Thévenot, Adam Olearius and F. A. Kotov in the Safavid dynasty in Persia where they lived along with Jews and Armenians. Traders from India of Sikh and Hindu background lived in the Qajar and Zand dynasties in Persia after a clampdown by Nader Shah and the Afghan Ghilzar wars in Iran.

Sarmarqandi and Bukharan traders bought Indian indigo from merchants of Hindu origin in Kandahar in 1783 according to George Forester. The tallest houses were owned by Hindus according to Elphinstone in 1815. Lumsden recorded 350 stores owned by Hindus in Kandahar. Finance, precious metals, and textiles were all dealt with by Sikhs and Hindus in Kandahar.

A Hindu worked for Timur Shah Durrani in Afghanistan. Peshawar Hindus were in Kabul by 1783. Money lending was the main occupation of Hindus in Kabul. Armenians and Hindus lived in Kabul according to an 1876 survey. Jews and Hindus lived in Herat in the 1800s. Sindhi Shikarpur Hindus, Jews, and Arabs lived in Balkh in 1886. Sindhi and Punjabi were the languages used by Indians in Afghanistan. Some Afghan cities including Kabul have places of worship for Hindus and Sikhs. Local citizenship has been obtained in Afghanistan by Hindu and Sikh traders.

Peshawari and Shikarpuri Indian traders were involved in Central Asia. The Shikarpuri invested in grain in the Emirate of Bukhara as well as Fergana cotton. They also engaged in legal money lending in Bukhara, which they could not legally do in Russian Turkestan. Jews, Hindus, Baloch, Persians, and Arabs lived in Samarkand, and Hindus and Baháʼís live in Baluchistan and Khorasan in Iran.

Uyghur merchants would harass Hindu usurers by screaming at them asking them if they ate beef or hanging cow skins on their quarters. Uyghur men also rioted and attacked Hindus for marrying Uyghur women in 1907 in Poskam and Yarkand like Ditta Ram calling for their beheading and stoning Indians to death as they engaged in anti-Hindu violence. Hindu Indian usurers engaging in a religious procession led to violence against them by Muslim Uyghurs. In 1896 two Uyghur Turkis attacked a Hindu merchant and the British consul Macartney demanded the Uyghurs be punished by flogging.

The money lenders and merchants of Hindu background from British India in Xinjiang were guaranteed by the British Consul-General. Russian refugees, missionaries, and British-Indian merchants and money lenders of Hindu background were potential targets of gangs of Kashgaris so the Consulate-General of Britain was a potential shelter. The killings of two Hindus at the hands of Uighurs took place in the Shamba Bazaar in a most brutal fashion. The plundering of the valuables of slaughtered British Indian Hindus happened in Posgam on 25 March 1933, and on the previous day in Kargilik Town at the hands of Uyghurs. Killings of Hindus took place in Khotan at the hands of the Bughra Amirs. Antagonism against both the British and Hindus ran high among the Muslim Turki Uyghur rebels in Xinjiang's southern area. Muslims plundered the possessions in Karghalik of Rai Sahib Dip Chand, who was the aksakal of Britain, and his fellow Hindus on 24 March 1933, and in Keryia they slaughtered British Indian Hindus. Sind's Shikarpur district was the origin of the Hindu diaspora there. The slaughter of the Hindus from British India was called the "Karghalik Outrage". The Muslims had killed nine of them. The forced removal of the Swedes was accompanied by the slaughter of the Hindus in Khotan by the Islamic Turkic rebels. The Emirs of Khotan slaughtered the Hindus as they forced the Swedes out and declared sharia in Khotan on 16 March 1933.

=== Southeast Asia ===
A major emigration from the Indian subcontinent was to Southeast Asia. There is a possibility that the first wave of Indian migration towards Southeast Asia occurred when Ashoka invaded Kalinga and following Samudragupta's expedition towards the South. This was followed by early interaction of Indian traders with Southeast Asians and, after the mid-first millennium CE, by the emigration of members of the Brahmin social caste. This resulted in the establishment of the Indianised kingdoms in Southeast Asia. The Chola rulers, who were known for their naval power, conquered Sumatra and the Malay Peninsula.

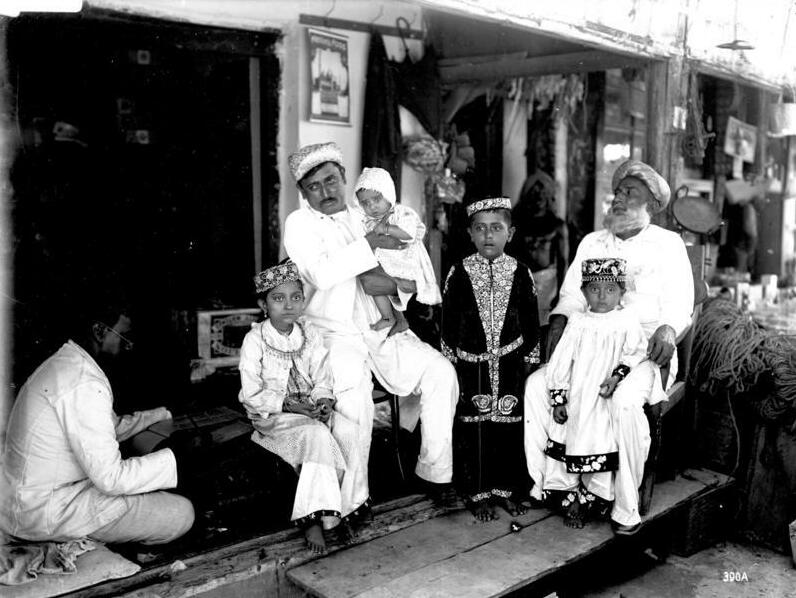
Indian trader's family in Bagamoyo, German East Africa, around 1906/18

Another early diaspora, of which little is known, was a reported Indian "Shendu" community that was recorded when Yunnan was annexed by the Han dynasty in the 1st century by the Chinese authorities.

=== British rule (1612 to 1947) ===
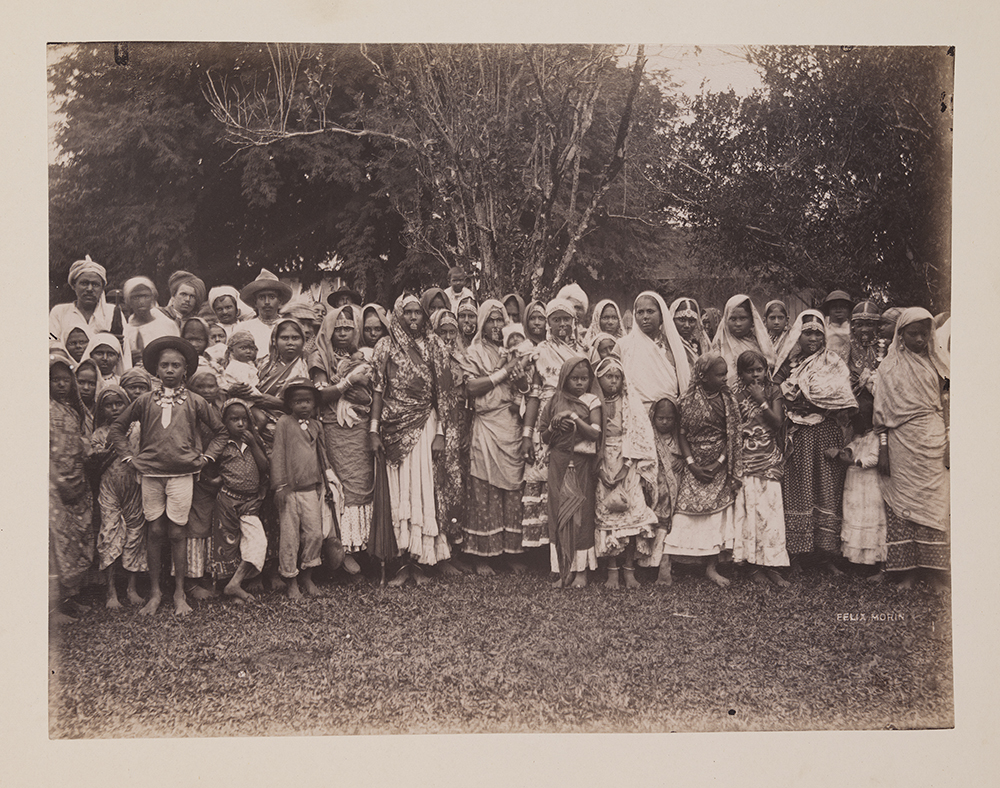
British Raj Indian indentured labourers in Trinidad and Tobago, c. 1890–1896.

During the mid-19th century right after the British rule ended, much of the migration that occurred was of pioneering Girmityas indentured workers – mostly Bhojpuri-speaking people from the Bhojpuri region of Bihar and Awadhi-speaking people from the Awadh region of Uttar Pradesh to other British colonies under the Indian indenture system. The major destinations were Mauritius, Guyana, Trinidad and Tobago, Suriname, other parts of the Caribbean (e.g. Jamaica, Guadeloupe, Martinique, Belize, Barbados, Grenada, Saint Vincent and the Grenadines, Saint Lucia), Fiji, Réunion, Seychelles, Malay Peninsula (e.g. Malaysia and Singapore), East Africa (e.g. Kenya, Somalia, Tanzania, Uganda) and Natal province of South Africa.

Gujarati and Sindhi merchants and traders settled in the Arabian Peninsula, Aden, Oman, Bahrain, Dubai, South Africa and East African countries, most of which were ruled by the British. The Indian rupee was the legal currency in many countries of Arabian peninsula. Punjabis, Rajasthani, Sindhis, Baloch and Kashmiris Camel drivers were brought to Australia.

=== Post-independence ===
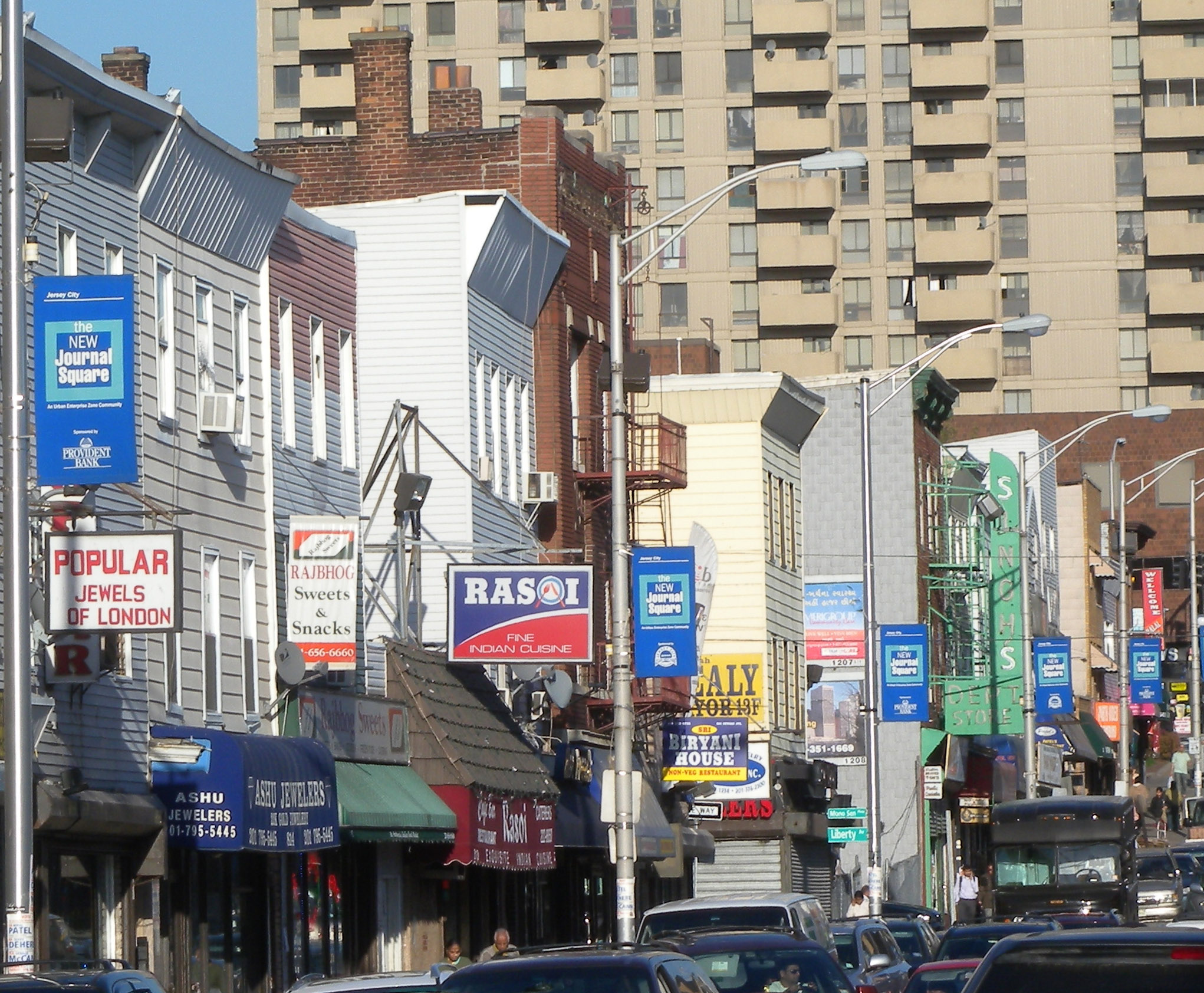
Individuals of Indian origin have achieved a high demographic profile in metropolitan areas worldwide, including India Square (Little Bombay) in Jersey City, New Jersey, United States, home to the highest concentration of Asian Indians in the Western Hemisphere.

After gaining independence from the British Raj, unlike internal migration, senior government leaders have historically not vocalized opinions on international emigration. As a result, it remains a political issue only in states with major emigrant populations, such as Kerala, Punjab, Tamil Nadu and to a lesser degree Gujarat, Andhra Pradesh and Goa. However, the phenomenon continues to be a major force in India's economic (foreign direct investment), social and political relations with nations having significant Indian populace. For example, the 2008 signing of the India–United States Civil Nuclear Agreement was helped by intense lobbying from Indian Americans.

== Overseas experience ==
=== Love for India ===
Indomania or Indomania is love, admiration or special interest for India or its people and culture. An Indophile is someone who loves India, Indian culture, cuisine, religions, history or its people.

=== Overseas discrimination ===
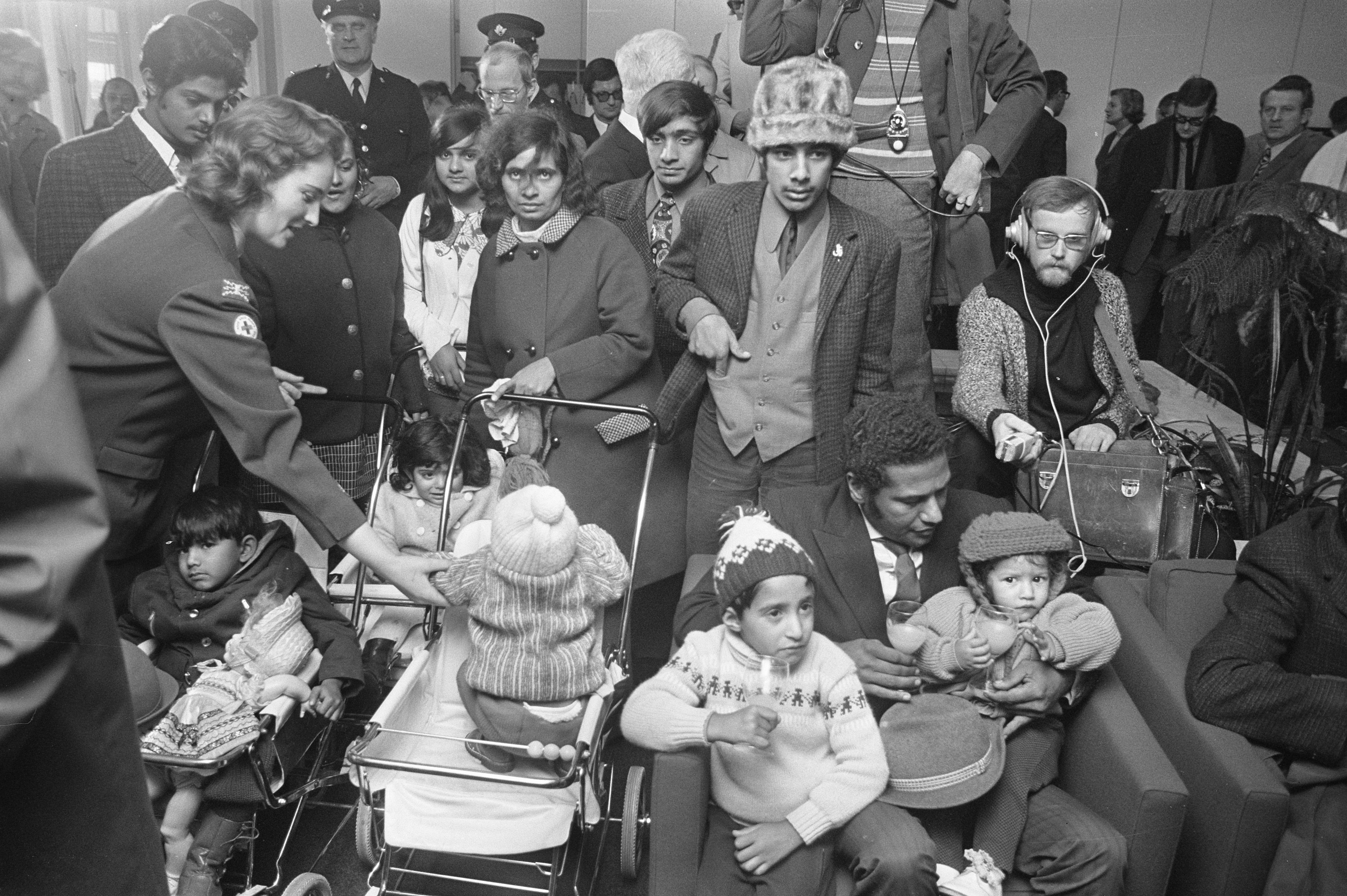
Indians expelled from Uganda arriving at Amsterdam Airport Schiphol, November 1972

Indian diaspora communities have experienced discrimination and anti-Indian sentiment in a number of countries, particularly in the context of colonial and postcolonial racial and nationalist policies. In South Africa, Indians faced extensive legal and racial discrimination under colonial rule and later under apartheid, including restrictions on residence, movement, political participation and economic activity.

In East Africa, South Asian communities also faced political and economic discrimination in some states after independence. This contributed to substantial emigration from countries such as Kenya and Tanzania and culminated in the expulsion of most of Uganda's South Asian population by President Idi Amin in 1972. Much of the property and businesses left behind by those expelled were subsequently taken over by the Ugandan state.

In Zanzibar, South Asians were among the groups affected by violence, deportations and property confiscations during and after the Zanzibar Revolution of 1964. The Asian population subsequently declined substantially through emigration.

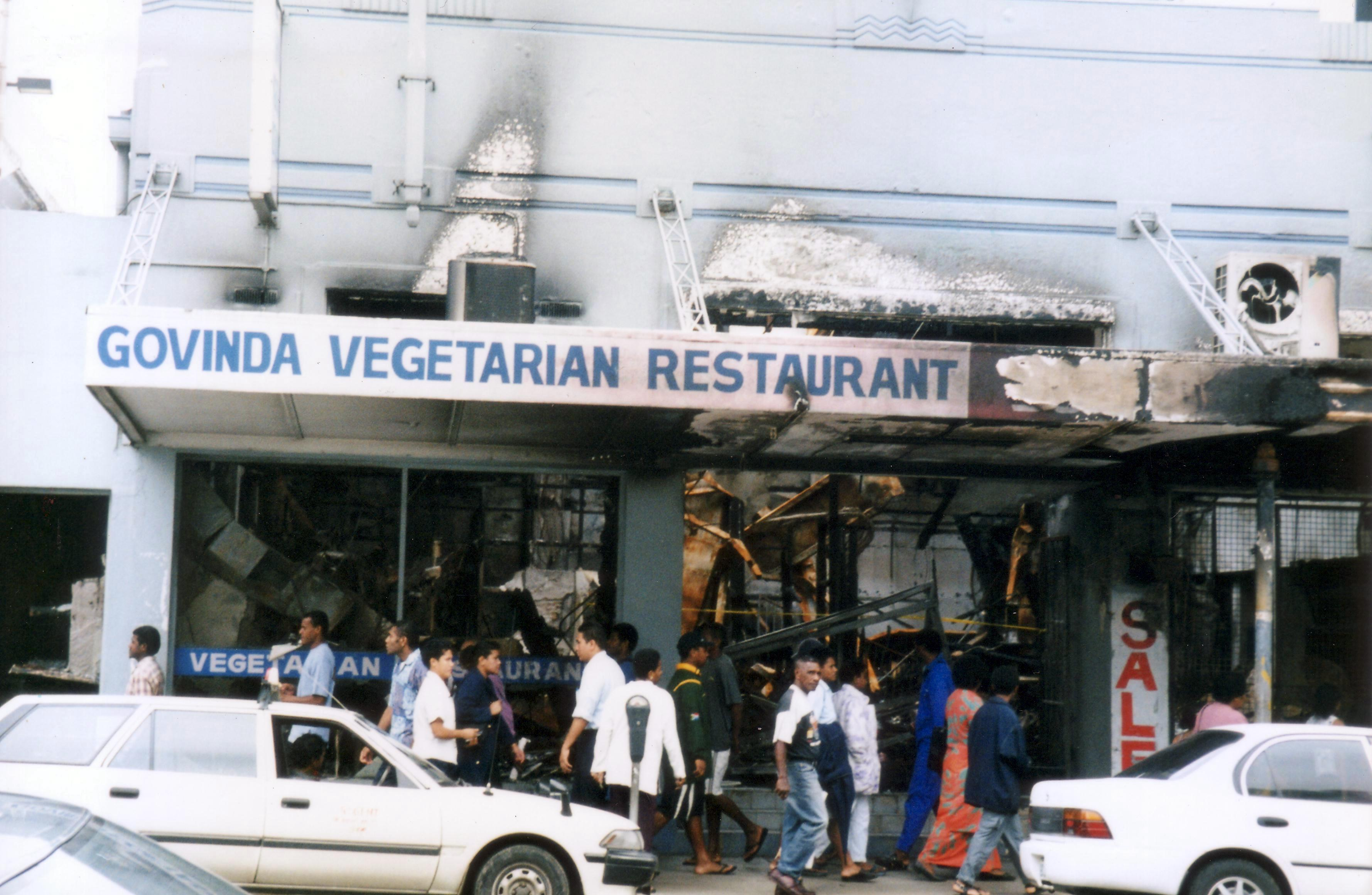
The burnt-out remains of Govinda's Indian Restaurant in Suva following the 2000 coup, during which Indo-Fijian-owned businesses were targeted in the city's central business district.

In Malaysia, Indians experienced socioeconomic marginalisation under postcolonial policies favouring the Bumiputera population, although these policies were not directed exclusively at Indians. Concerns over discrimination contributed to the emergence of the Hindu Rights Action Force (HINDRAF), which organised a major protest in 2007.

In Fiji, Indo-Fijians faced political and institutional discrimination and ethnic tensions over political representation and land. These tensions contributed to political instability surrounding the military coups of 1987 and 2000, after which substantial numbers of Indo-Fijians emigrated.

In Burma, the government of Ne Win introduced policies of nationalisation and economic Burmanisation after the 1962 Burmese coup d'état. These policies had a particularly severe impact on the country's Indian business community, while restrictions on citizenship and employment and the nationalisation of businesses and property contributed to a large-scale exodus of people of Indian origin during the 1960s.

== Demography by country ==
A world map showing the estimated distribution and concentration of people of Indian descent or ancestry by country.: India + 1,000,000 + 100,000 / + 10,000 + 1,000 No data

Population of Overseas Indians, by country, according to the Consular Services of the Ministry of External Affairs of India, or other estimates (if indicated).

World region / Country	Articles	Overseas Indian population	Percentage
Eastward Asia		~6,223,900	
Malaysia	Malaysian Indians	2,012,600	6.19%
Myanmar	Burmese Indians · Anglo-Indian people	2,009,207	2.50%
Sri Lanka	Indians in Sri Lanka (Tamils)	842,323	4.16%
Singapore	Indian Singaporeans	812,000	13.5%
Nepal	Indian Nepalis	426,941	1.47%
Bangladesh	Indians in Bangladesh	127,014	0.09%
Philippines	Indian Filipino	70,000	
Indonesia	Indian Indonesians (Mardijkers · Tamils)	7,251	0.002%
China	Indians in China	56,050 (55000 are NRI) (550 are PIO)	0.004%
Bhutan		46,974	6.33%
Thailand	Indians in Thailand	46,326	0.07%
Japan	Indians in Japan	43,886	0.03%
Hong Kong	Indians in Hong Kong	32,796	
Maldives	Indians in the Maldives	25,108	4.87%
Brunei	Indians in Brunei	21,102 (from South Asian countries)	4.79%
South Korea	Indians in Korea	12,929	0.02%
Taiwan	Indians in Taiwan	4,382	0.02%
Vietnam	Indians in Vietnam	2,043	0.002%
Cambodia	Indians in Cambodia	1,510	0.01%
Laos		528	0.01%
North Korea	Indians in Korea	370	0.001%
Mongolia		117	0.004%
East Timor		100	0.01%
Middle (East) Crescent (Note: comprising Central Asia, Middle East and North Africa – this area resembles a crescent straddling in the middle of Europe, Africa and Asia)		11,447,600+	
United Arab Emirates	Indians in the United Arab Emirates	3,425,144	36.04%
Saudi Arabia	Non-Resident Indians in Saudi Arabia	2,594,947	7.58%
Pakistan	Indians in Pakistan	16,501 (Indian citizens; 2015); 1,709,217 (post-partition migrants)	0.82%
Oman	Indians in Oman	1,375,667	30.77%
Kuwait	Indians in Kuwait	1,152,175	25.81%
Qatar	Indians in Qatar	702,013	24.67%
Bahrain	Indians in Bahrain	326,658	22.19%
Israel	Indians in Israel, Indian Jews in Israel	48,000 / 97,467	0.7%
Armenia	Indians in Armenia	28,659	1.0%
Jordan		20,760	0.19%
Kyrgyzstan	Indians in Kyrgyzstan	11,204	0.17%
Yemen	Indians in Yemen	10,500	0.04%
Cyprus	Indians in Cyprus	7,499	0.84%
Kazakhstan	Hinduism in Kazakhstan	6,885	0.05%
Algeria	Indians in Algeria	5,710	0.01%
Iran	Indians in Iran	4,337	0.01%
Georgia		3,948	0.11%
Afghanistan	Indians in Afghanistan	3,106	0.01%
Turkey	Indians in Turkey; Turkic peoples in India	3,092	0.004%
Sudan	Indians in Sudan	1,764	0.004%
Libya	Indians in Libya	1,502	0.02%
Lebanon	Indians in Lebanon	1,311	0.02%
Egypt	Indians in Egypt	1,249	0.001%
Tajikistan		618	0.01%
Uzbekistan		399	0.001%
Morocco		320	0.001%
Turkmenistan		240	0.004%
Iraq	Indians in Iraq	234	0.001%
Mauritania	Indians in Mauritania	150	0.004%
Tunisia	Indians in Tunisia	137	0.001%
Syria	Indians in Syria	94	0.0004%
Azerbaijan	Hinduism in Azerbaijan	67	0.001%
Palestine		20	0.0004%
	See also: Arabs in India		
Sub-Saharan Africa		~2,911,200	
South Africa	Indian South Africans (Natal Indians & Tamils)	1,375,834	2.47%
Mauritius	Mauritians of Indian origin (Biharis & Tamils)	894,500	68.5%
Réunion (France)	Réunionnais of Indian origin (Malbars & Zarabes)	297,300	34.95%
Kenya	Indians in Kenya	47,555 (Kenyan nationals); 42,972 (non-Kenyan nationals)	0.19%
Tanzania	Indians in Tanzania	60,000	0.1%
Nigeria	Indians in Nigeria	40,035	0.02%
Uganda	Indians in Uganda	30,000	0.07%
Madagascar	Indians in Madagascar	17,500	0.06%
Seychelles	Indo-Seychellois (Tamils)	17,200	17.47%
Mozambique	Indians in Mozambique	15,492	0.06%
DR Congo	Indians in DR Congo	10,008	0.01%
Ghana	Ghanaian Indian	10,000	0.03%
Zimbabwe	Indians in Zimbabwe	9,500	0.06%
Zambia	Indians in Zambia	5,709	0.03%
Botswana	Indians in Botswana	5,650	0.24%
Ethiopia	Hinduism in Ethiopia	5,515	0.01%
Angola	Indians in Angola	4,500	0.01%
Lesotho	Indians in Lesotho	3,000	0.15%
Rwanda	Indians in Rwanda	3,000	0.02%
Malawi	Indians in Malawi	2,408	0.01%
Côte d'Ivoire	Indians in Ivory Coast	1,500	0.01%
Liberia	Indians in Liberia	1,500	0.03%
Eswatini	Indians in Eswatini	1,500	0.14%
South Sudan	Indians in South Sudan	1,100	0.01%
Sierra Leone	Indians in Sierra Leone	959	0.01%
Gambia	Indians in Gambia	716	0.03%
Namibia	Indians in Namibia	704	0.03%
Djibouti	Indians in Djibouti	650	0.07%
Congo	Indians in Congo	598	0.01%
Senegal	Indians in Senegal	532	0.003%
Togo	Indians in Togo	510	0.01%
Burundi	Indians in Burundi	500	0.004%
Mali	Indians in Mali	437	0.002%
Eritrea	Indians in Eritrea	303	0.01%
Benin	Indians in Benin	291	0.003%
Cameroon	Indians in Cameroon	250	0.001%
Equatorial Guinea	Indians in Equatorial Guinea	250	0.02%
Comoros	Indians in Comoros	230	0.02%
Burkina Faso	Indians in Burkina Faso	205	0.001%
Niger	Indians in Niger	150	0.001%
Chad	Indians in Chad	120	0.001%
Gabon	Indians in Gabon	110	0.01%
Guinea Bissau	Indians in Guinea Bissau	104	0.01%
Central African Republic	Indians in CAR	100	0.002%
Somalia	Indians in Somalia	100	0.001%
Guinea	Indians in Guinea	74	0.001%
Sao Tome and Principe		51	0.02%
Cape Verde		20	0.004%
	See also: Siddi		
Central and South America		42,420+	
Brazil	Indian immigration to Brazil	23,254	0.01%
Panama	Indians in Panama	5,383	0.12%
Puerto Rico (US)	Indo-Caribbean people · Asian Latin Americans	4,984	0.15%
Mexico	Indian Mexicans	2,656	0.002%
Chile	Indians in Chile	1,767	0.01%
Argentina	Indians in Argentina	1,600	0.001%
Peru	Indians in Peru	626	0.002%
Cuba	Indo-Caribbean people · Asian Latin Americans	870	0.01%
Paraguay	Asian Latin Americans	600	0.01%
Colombia	Asian Latin Americans	374	0.001%
Ecuador	Ecuador–India relations	355	0.002%
Uruguay	Indian Uruguayans	125	0.004%
Dominican Republic	Indo-Caribbean people	90	0.001%
Costa Rica	Asian Latin Americans	83	0.002%
Guatemala	Asian Latin Americans	83	0.0005%
Venezuela	Indians in Venezuela	690	0.002%
Bolivia	Indians in Bolivia	100	0.001%
Nicaragua	Asian Latin Americans	40	0.001%
El Salvador	Asian Latin Americans	17	0.0003%
Honduras	Asian Latin Americans	17	0.0002%
Northern America and the Caribbean		7,443,900+	
United States	Indian Americans	4,946,306	1.49%
Canada	Indo-Canadians	1,858,755	5.12%
Trinidad and Tobago	Indo–Trinidadians and Tobagonians	468,524	31.02%
Guyana	Indo-Guyanese	299,382	38.88%
Suriname	Indo-Surinamese	237,205	39.37%
Jamaica	Indo-Jamaicans	101,486	3.72%
Martinique (France)	Indo-Martiniquais	36,123	9.64%
Guadeloupe (France)	Indo-Guadeloupeans	35,617	8.30%
Belize	Indo-Belizeans	12,452	3.86%
Saint Lucia	Indo–Saint Lucian	3,575	2.16%
Barbados	Indians in Barbados	3,018	1.33%
Grenada	Indo-Grenadians	2,284	2.16%
Cayman Islands (UK)	Indo-Caribbean people	1,218	1.84%
Saint Vincent and the Grenadines	Indo-Vincentian	1,199	1.1%
Antigua and Barbuda	Indo-Caribbean people	942	1.11%
Saint Kitts and Nevis	Indo-Caribbean people	709	1.53%
Haiti	Indo-Haitians	580	0.01%
Bermuda (UK)	Indo-Caribbean people	572	0.89%
Bahamas	Indo-Caribbean people	519	0.15%
British Virgin Islands (UK)	Indo-Caribbean people	443	1.58%
Curaçao (Netherlands)	Indo-Caribbean people	394	0.26%
Aruba (Netherlands)	Indo-Caribbean people	314	0.31%
Montserrat (UK)	Indo-Caribbean people	240	5.19%
Turks and Caicos Islands (UK)	Indo-Caribbean people	235	0.59%
Dominica	Indo-Caribbean people	97	0.14%
Anguilla (UK)	Indo-Caribbean people	40	0.27%
French Guiana (France)	Indians in French Guiana	29	0.01%
Europe		2,802,750+	
United Kingdom	British Indians	United Kingdom: 1,451,862 (2011) (Note: This census figure may not include recent immigrants or people of partial Indian ancestry.); England: 1,843,238 (2021); Scotland: 32,706 (2011); Wales: 21,066 (2021); Northern Ireland: 9,881 (2021)	United Kingdom: 2.3% England: 3.26% Scotland: 0.62% Wales: 0.68% Northern Ireland: 0.52%
Germany	Indians in Germany	301,000	0.29%
Italy	Indians in Italy	171.429	0.27%
Netherlands	Indians in the Netherlands	65,399	0.37%
France	Indians in France	58,983	0.09%
Spain	Indians in Spain	56,459	0.12%
Sweden	Indian immigrants in Sweden	58,094	0.51%
Poland	Indians in Poland	38,000	0.03%
Portugal	Indians in Portugal	35,416	0.34%
Belgium		24,592	0.22%
Norway	Indians in Norway	21,982	0.4%
Republic of Ireland	South Asian people in Ireland	20,969; 45,000	0.88%
Finland	Indians in Finland	20,000	0.36%
Denmark		18,970	0.32%
Austria		16,424	0.18%
Switzerland	Indians in Switzerland	16,085	0.19%
Russia	Indians in Russia	14,000	0.02%
Greece	Indians in Greece	11,333	1.2%
Croatia	Indians in Croatia	11,982	0.310%
Serbia		10,000	0.143%
Czech Republic		8,465	0.08%
Ukraine		7,963	0.02%
Malta	Indians in Malta	7,946	1.53%
Hungary		3,886	0.04%
Luxembourg		2,804	0.45%
Latvia		1,842	0.1%
Romania	Indians in Romania	1,572	0.01%
Estonia		1,302	0.1%
Bulgaria		896	0.01%
Moldova		773	0.03%
Iceland		544	0.14%
Belarus		311	0.003%
Slovenia		285	0.01%
Slovakia		200	0.004%
Lithuania		129	0.005%
Andorra		57	0.07%
Albania		56	0.002%
Bosnia & Herzegovina		26	0.001%
Liechtenstein		25	0.06%
Monaco		25	0.08%
North Macedonia		10	0.0005%
Oceania		1,500,000+	
Australia	Indian Australians	976,000	3.05%
New Zealand	Indian New Zealanders	239,193	4.99%
Fiji	Indo-Fijians	315,198	35.36%
Papua New Guinea		3,000	0.03%
Vanuatu		810	0.27%
Tonga		224	0.22%
Cook Islands (New Zealand)		205	1.01%
Kiribati		50	0.04%
Solomon Islands		50	0.01%
Tuvalu		50	0.47%
French Polynesia (France)		38	0.01%
Federated States of Micronesia		35	0.03%
Samoa	Indians in Samoa	30	0.01%
Palau		27	0.15%
Nauru		20	0.17%
Marshall Islands		15	0.03%
Niue (New Zealand)		12	0.70%
Total overseas Indian population		~32,104,000	

== Diaspora by host country ==
=== Africa ===
==== Mauritius ====
The people are known as Indo-Mauritians, and form about 65.8% of the population. The majority of them are Hindu (73.7%) and a significant group are Muslims (26.3%). Mauritius is the only Hindu majority (48.5%) country of Africa according to the 2011 census. There are also a relatively small number of Baháʼís and Sikhs. The mother tongue of Indo-Mauritians is Creole, as well as French and English in general fields, however various Indian languages are still spoken, especially Bhojpuri, Tamil, Hindi, Marathi, Odia, Telugu, and Urdu as they are used in religious activities.

Mauritius hosts the Aapravasi Ghat, the only site of UNESCO in the world, to pay homage to the memory of indenture. The Indian Festivals of Maha Shivaratri, Diwali, Thaipusam, Pongal, Ganesh Chaturthi and Ugadi are all National Holidays as well as the Annual Commemoration of the Arrival of Indian Indentured Labourers in Mauritius.

==== Réunion ====
Indians make up a quarter of Réunion's population. Most originally came as indentured workers from Tamil Nadu.

==== South Africa ====
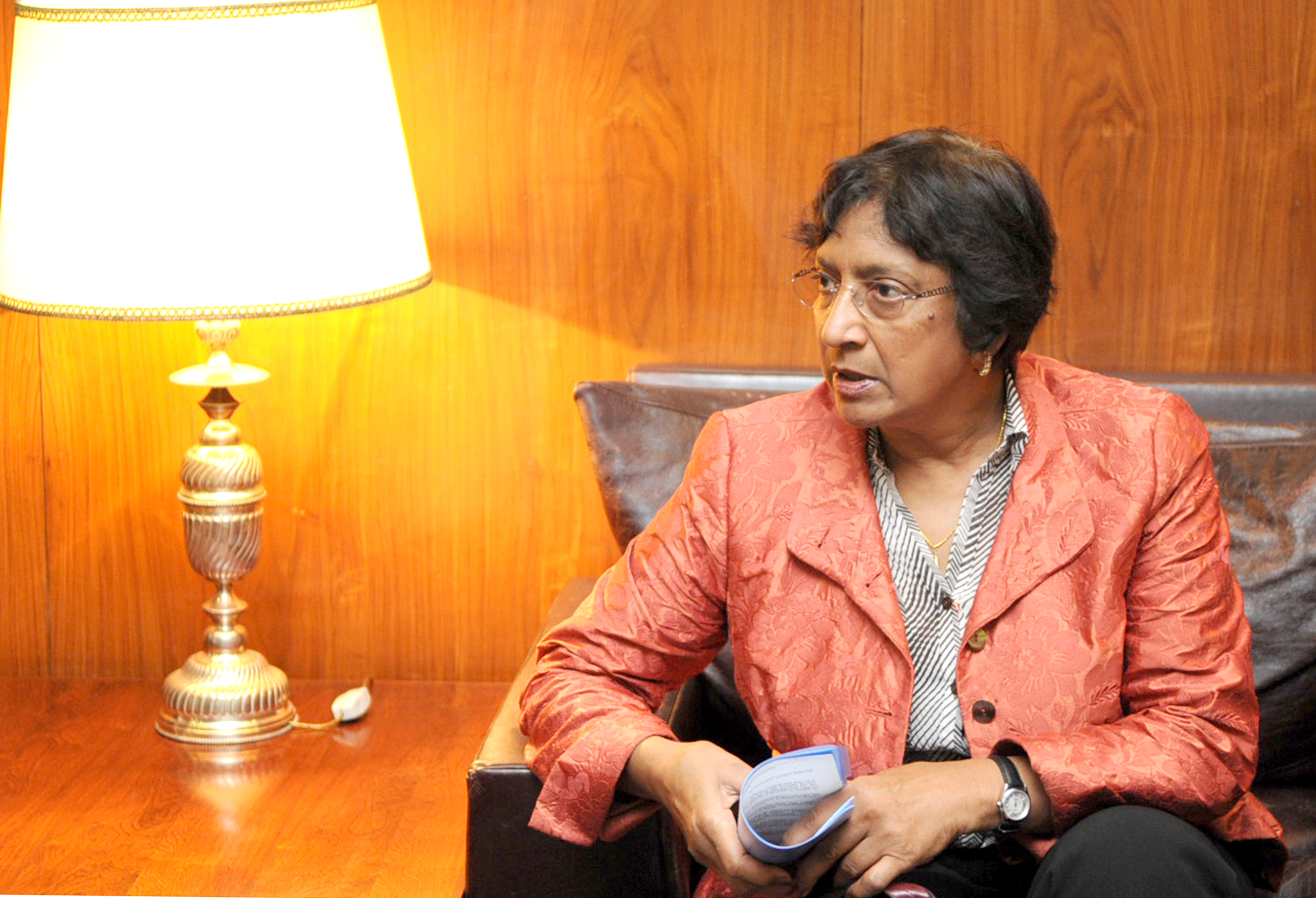
Navanethem Pillay, an Indian South African descent who served as the U.N High Commissioner for Human Rights.

Most Asians in South Africa are descended from indentured Indian labourers who were brought by the British from India in the 19th century, mostly to work on the Sugarcane plantations of what is now the province of KwaZulu-Natal (KZN). The majority are of Tamil speaking heritage along with people that speak Hindi or Bhojpuri, mostly descending from Bihar and Uttar Pradesh. There are also smaller numbers of Telugu speaking communities while a minority are descended from Indian traders who migrated to South Africa at around the same time, many from Gujarat. The city of Durban has the highest number of Asians in sub-Saharan Africa, and the Indian independence leader Mahatma Gandhi worked as a lawyer in the country in the early 1900s. South Africa has one of the highest number of people of Indian descent outside of India in the world, i.e. born in South Africa and not migrant. Most of them are fourth or fifth-generation descendants. Most Indian South Africans do not speak any Indian languages, as they were 'lost' over the generations, although some do enjoy watching Indian movies and listening to Indian music, and they maintain (and have had imposed upon them) a strong Indian racial identity as a consequence of the legacy of Apartheid.

==== East Africa ====
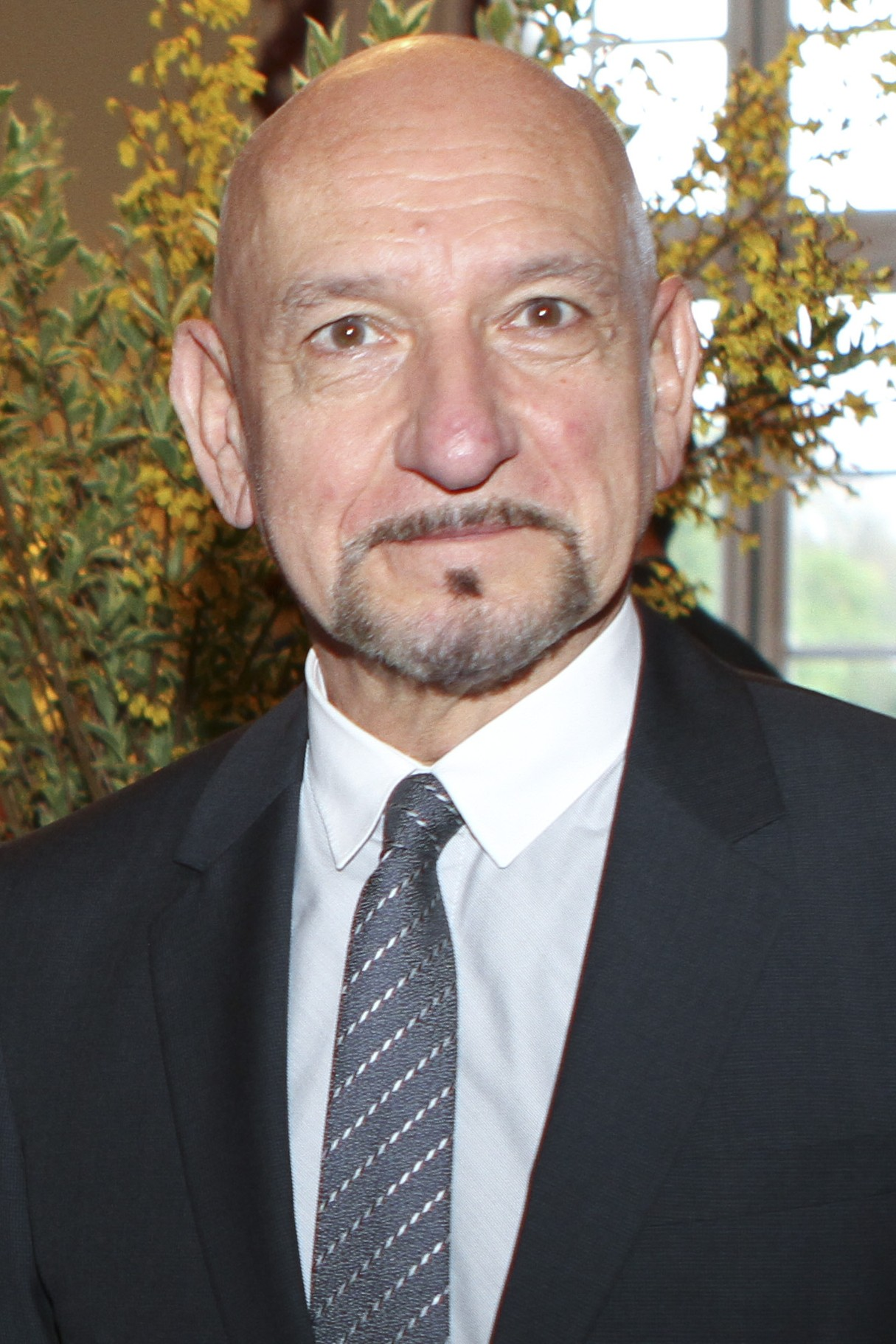
Sir Ben Kingsley of Indo-Kenyan descent is a notable Oscar-winning actor

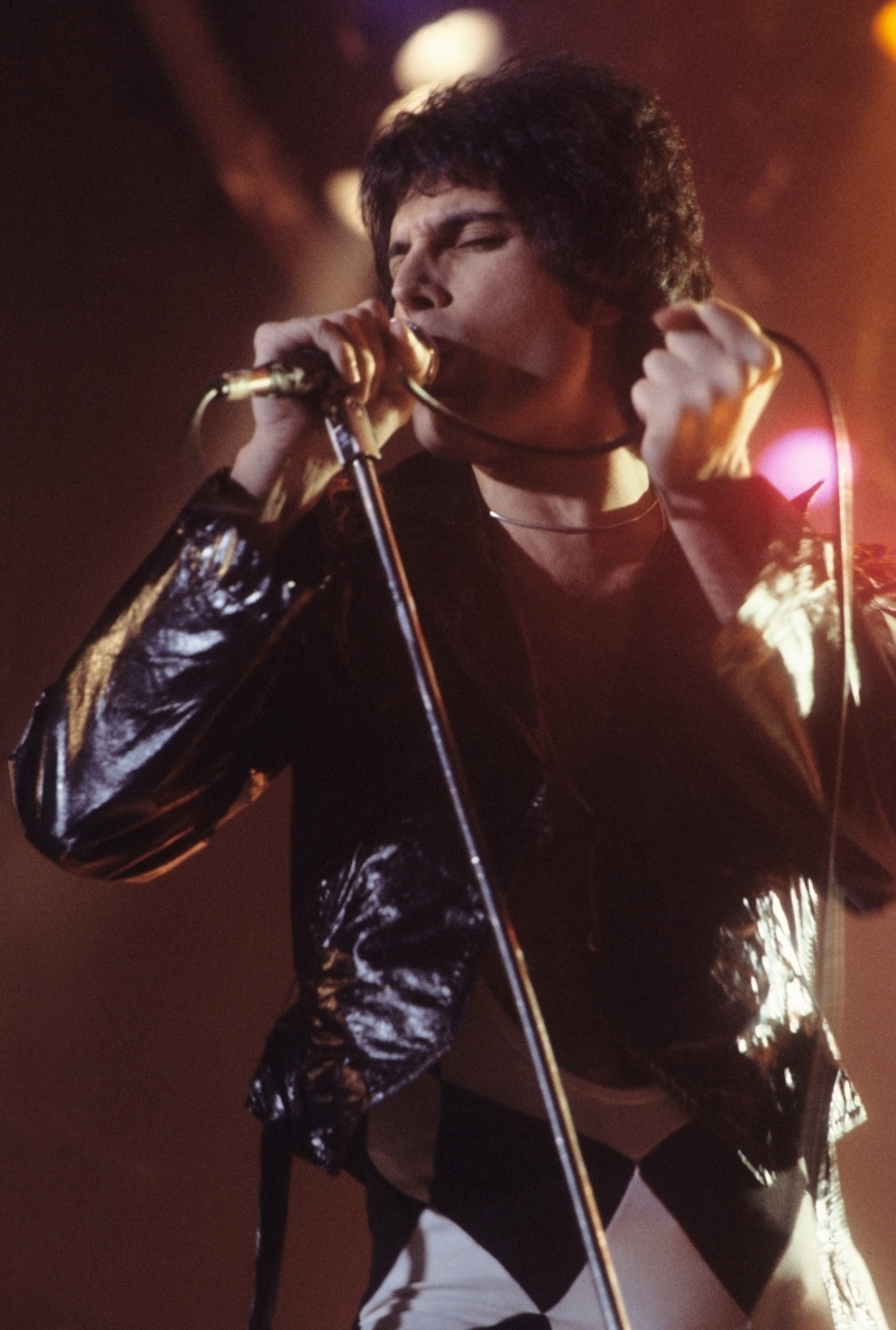
Farrokh Bulsara, better known as Freddie Mercury, lead singer and co-founder of the immensely successful rock band Queen, was of Parsi descent born in Zanzibar.

Before the larger wave of migration during the British colonial era, a significant group of South Asians, especially from the west coast (Sindh, Surat, Konkan and Malabar) travelled regularly to South East Africa, especially Zanzibar. It is believed that they travelled in Arab dhows, Maratha Navy ships (under Kanhoji Angre), and possibly Chinese junks and Portuguese vessels. Some of these people settled in South-East Africa and later spread to places like present day Uganda, and Mozambique. Later they mingled with the much larger wave of South Asians who came with the British.

Indian migration to the modern countries of Kenya, Uganda, Mauritius, South Africa, and Tanzania began nearly a century ago when these parts of the continent were under British and French colonial rule. Most of these migrants were of Gujarati or Punjabi origin. There are almost three million Indians living in South-East Africa. Indian-led businesses were (or are) the backbone of the economies of these countries. These ranged in the past from small rural grocery stores to Sugarcane mill. In addition, Indian professionals, such as doctors, teachers, engineers, also played an important part in the development of these countries.

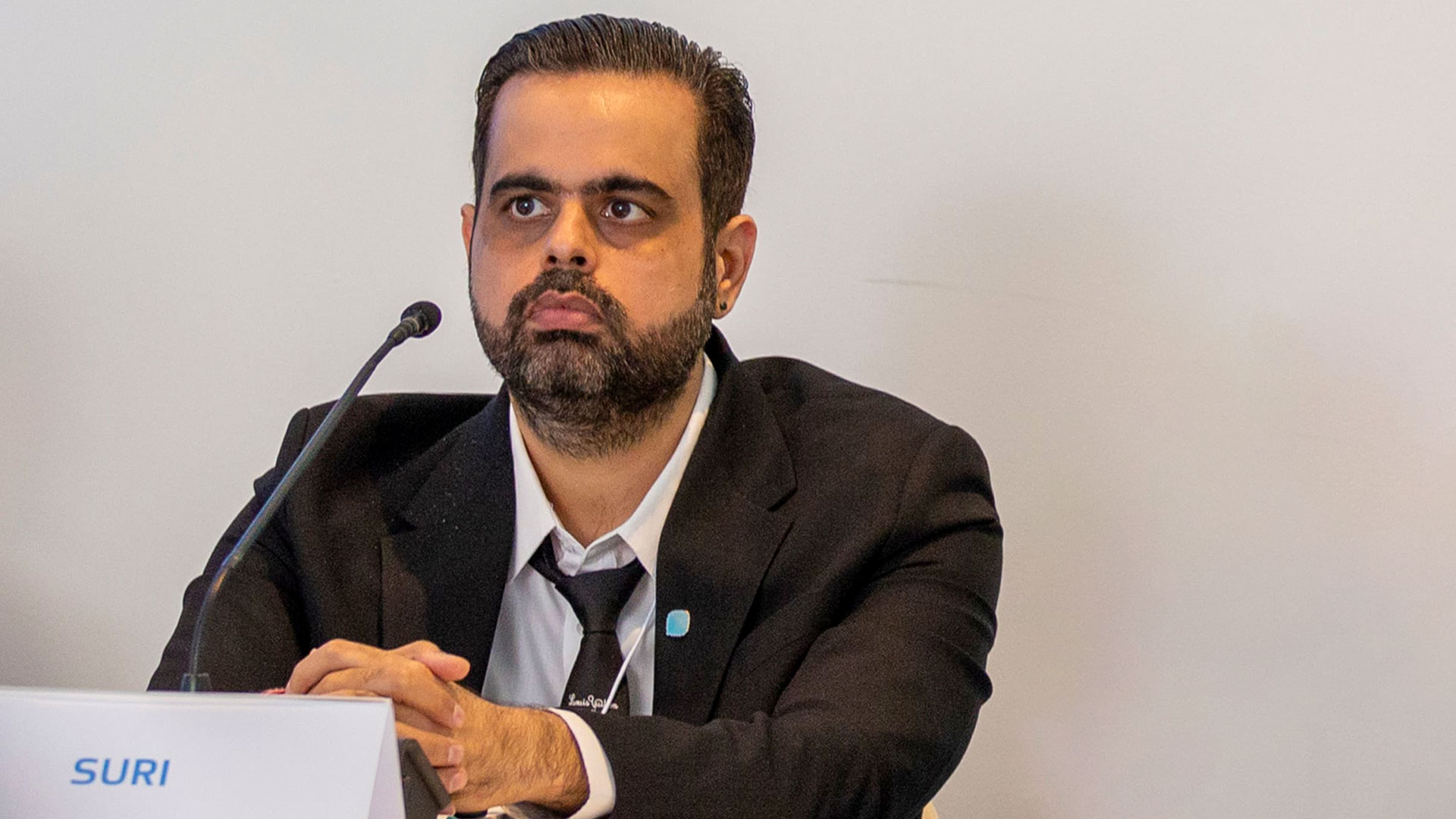
Prateek Suri, an Indian‑origin entrepreneur active in African markets with residence in Africa.

Over the decades, South Asian communities also became closely linked to commercial activity in the region. Many established trading networks that connected coastal ports with inland markets, while others developed small and medium‑sized enterprises that supported local economies. Their involvement expanded into areas such as retail, transport, manufacturing, and later investment, contributing to the growth of both urban and rural economic sectors. This commercial presence has continued into the modern era, with Indian‑origin businesses remaining active across Africa and participating in a wide range of economic activities.

=== East Asia ===
==== Japan ====
Indians in Japan consist of migrants from India to Japan and their descendants. As of December 2008, There are currently around 40,000 Indians living in Japan. Roughly 60% consist of expatriate IT professionals and their families.

=== South Asia ===
==== Nepal ====
Estimates of the Indian population in Nepal vary between 300,000 and 700,000.This diaspora is concentrated in the Terai region, as well as in urban centers like Kathmandu, Biratnagar, and Birgunj. Indian migration to Nepal dates back centuries, during the Malla and Shah dynasties, trade routes connected Nepal with northern India, encouraging settlement of Indian merchants and artisans. The most prominent group, the Marwari people from Rajasthan, migrated in the 19th century, invited by the Rana rulers. They established themselves as traders and financiers. Other communities, including Punjabis, Bengalis, and Muslims, also migrated during the colonial era.The 1950 Indo-Nepali open border treaty granted citizens of both nations reciprocal rights of residence, property ownership, trade, and movement.

=== Southeast Asia ===
==== Indonesia ====
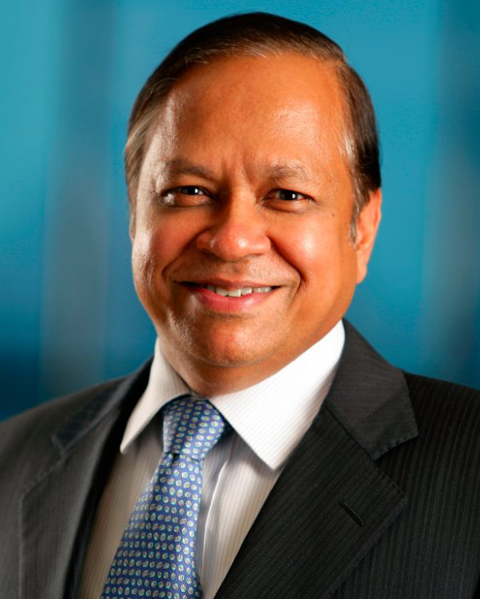
Sri Prakash Lohia, founder of Indorama Corporation and sixth richest person in Indonesia according to Forbes

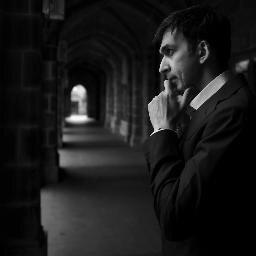
Manoj Punjabi is an Indian Indonesian film and television producer and owner of the biggest production house in Indonesia.

Due to economic factors, most traders and businessmen among PIOs have over past decades moved to Jakarta from outlying areas such as Medan and Surabaya. Almost half the Indian Community in Indonesia is now Jakarta-based; it is estimated that the population of Jakarta's Indian community is about 19,000.

==== Malaysia ====
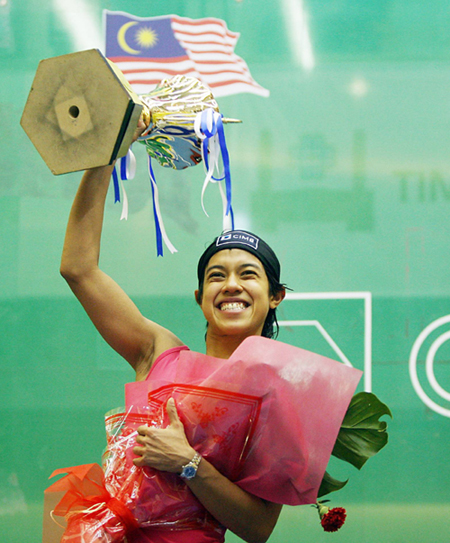
Former World No. 1 of women's squash, Malaysia's Nicol David, is of Chindian descent.

Malaysia has one of the world's largest overseas Indian and overseas Chinese populations. Most Indians migrated to Malaysia as plantation labourers under British rule. They are a significant minority ethnic group, making up 8% or 2,410,000 as 2017 of the Malaysian population. 85% of these people are Tamil-speaking. They have retained their languages and religion – 88% of ethnic Indians in Malaysia identify as Hindus. A minority number of the population are Sikhs and Muslims.

There is also a small community of Indian origin, the Chitty, who are the descendants of only Tamil traders who had emigrated before 1500 CE. Considering themselves Tamil, speaking Malay, and practicing Hinduism, the Chittys number about 200,000 today.

==== Philippines ====
Currently, there are over 150,000 people of Indian origin residing in Philippines.

India and the Philippines have historic cultural and economic ties going back over 3,000 years. Iron Age finds in the Philippines point to the existence of trade between Tamil Nadu in South India and what are today the Philippine Islands during the ninth and tenth centuries BCE.

During the Seven Years' War, Indians from Chennai, and Tamil Nadu were part of the British expedition against Spanish Manila, taking the city from the Spanish East Indies government and occupying the surrounding areas until Caintâ and Morong (today in Rizal province) between 1762 and 1763. Following the end war's end, a number of Indian soldiers mutinied, settled, and married local Tagalog women. These Sepoy Indians still have descendants in the town today.

==== Singapore ====
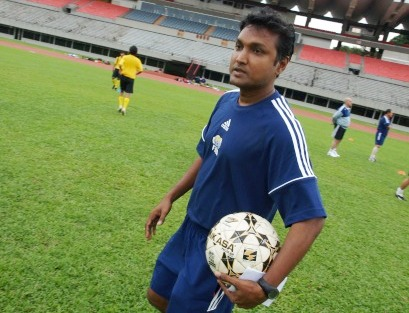
V. Sundramoorthy is a former Singapore international footballer and currently the head coach of S.League club Tampines Rovers.

Indian Singaporeans – defined as persons of South Asian paternal ancestry – form 9% of the country's citizens and permanent residents, making them Singapore's third largest ethnic group. Among cities, Singapore has one of the largest overseas Indian populations.

Although contact with ancient India left a deep cultural impact on Singapore's indigenous Malay society, the mass migration of ethnic Indians to the island only began with the founding of modern Singapore by the British in 1819. Initially, the Indian population was transient, mainly comprising young men who came as workers, soldiers and convicts. By the mid-20th century, a settled community had emerged, with a more balanced gender ratio and a better spread of age groups. Tamil is one among the four official languages of Singapore alongside English, Chinese and Malay.

Singapore's Indian population is notable for its class stratification, with disproportionately large elite and lower income groups. This long-standing problem has grown more visible since the 1990s with an influx of both well-educated and unskilled migrants from India, and as part of growing income inequality in Singapore. Indians earn higher incomes than Malays, the other major minority group. Indians are also significantly more likely to hold university degrees than these groups. However, the mainly locally born Indian students in public primary and secondary schools under-perform the national average at major examinations.

Singapore Indians are linguistically and religiously diverse, with South Indians and Hindus forming majorities. Indian culture has endured and evolved over almost 200 years. By the mid to late 20th century, it had become somewhat distinct from contemporary South Asian cultures, even as Indian elements became diffused within a broader Singaporean culture. Since the 1990s, new Indian immigrants have increased the size and complexity of the local Indian population. Together with modern communications like cable television and the Internet, this has connected Singapore with an emerging global Indian culture.

Prominent Indian individuals have long made a mark in Singapore as leaders of various fields in national life. Indians are also collectively well-represented, and sometimes over-represented, in areas such as politics, education, diplomacy and the law.

There is also a small community of Indian origin, the Chitty, who are the descendants of Tamil traders who had emigrated before 1500 CE. Considering themselves Tamil, speaking Tamil, and practice Hinduism, the Chittys number about 2,000 today.

=== West Asia ===
==== Armenia ====
There are over 28,000 Indian citizens in Armenia, including those who are seeking permanent residence status in Armenia, as recorded in 2018. In the first half of 2018, 10,237 Indians crossed Armenia's borders, and more than 2,000 were seeking permanent residence status.

==== Israel ====
The Bene Israel (Hebrew: בני ישראל, "Sons of Israel") are an ancient group of Jews who migrated in the 18th century from villages in the Konkan area to nearby Indian cities, primarily Mumbai, but also to Pune, and Ahmedabad. In the second half of the 20th century, most of them emigrated to Israel, where they now number about 85,000. The native language of the Bene Israel is Judæo-Marathi, a form of Marathi.

Another prominent community that migrated to Israel after its creation were the Jews of Cochin, in Kerala (Cochin Jews) – a community with a very long history. They are known to have been granted protection by the king of the Princely State of Cochin. The earliest Jews in this region, as per local tradition, date to as early as 379 CE. The community was a mix of native Jews (called "Black Jews"), and European Jews (called "White Jews") who had emigrated to Cochin after the successive European conquests of Cochin. The Jewish community of Cochin spoke a variant of Malayalam, called Judeo-Malayalam. The community, after the creation of Israel, saw a mass exodus from Cochin, and is presently facing extinction in India.

Still another group of Indians to arrive in Israel belong to the Bnei Menashe ("Children of Menasseh", Hebrew בני מנשה) a group of more than 10,000 people from India's North-Eastern border states of Manipur and Mizoram, who claim descent from one of the Lost Tribes of Israel, and of whom about 3,700 now live in Israel (some of them in Israeli settlements on the West Bank). Linguistically, Bnei Menashe are Tibeto-Burmans and belong to the Mizo, Kuki and Chin peoples (the terms are virtually interchangeable). The move to convert them to Judaism and bring them to Israel is politically controversial in both India and Israel.

==== Persian Gulf ====
Indians command a dominant majority of the population Persian Gulf countries. After the 1970s oil boom in the Middle East, numerous Indians from Kerala emigrated, taking advantage of close historical ties with the 'Gulf' as well as the lack of ample skilled labour from nearby Africa and the Middle East. Major urban centres such as Dubai, Abu Dhabi, Doha, Riyadh, Muscat, Baghdad, Kuwait, and Manama were experiencing a development boom and thousands of Indians laboured in construction industries.

This work was done on a contractual basis rather than permanently, and working age men continued to return home every few years. This has remained the dominant pattern as the countries in the Persian Gulf, especially United Arab Emirates, Bahrain, Qatar and Kuwait have a common policy of not naturalising non-Arabs, even if they are born there.

The Persian Gulf region has provided incomes many times over for the same type of job in India and has geographical proximity to India, and these incomes are free of taxation. The NRIs make up a good proportion of the working class in the Gulf Cooperation Council (GCC). NRI population in these GCC countries is estimated to be around 20 million, of which a quarter is resident in the United Arab Emirates (UAE). In 2005, about 75% of the population in the UAE was of Indian descent. The majority originate from Kerala, Tamil Nadu, Uttar Pradesh, Odisha, Karnataka, and Goa. Similarly, Indians are the single largest nationality in Qatar, representing around 85% of the total population as of 2014. They also form majorities in Bahrain, Kuwait, and Oman.

Since the early 2000s, significant number of Indians have reached the region, taking up high skill jobs in business and industry. Major Indian corporations maintain solid regional presence there while some are headquartered there.

There is a huge population of NRIs in West Asia, most coming from Kerala and Andhra Pradesh. They work as engineers, doctors, lawyers, labourers and in clerical jobs. Unlike in Europe and America, most of the countries in West Asia do not grant citizenship or permanent residency to these Indians, however long they might live there. They have a minority in Saudi Arabia. The NRI population tends to save and remit considerable amounts to their dependents in India. It is estimated such remittances may be over US$10 billion per annum (including remittances by formal and informal channels in 2007–2008). The relative ease with which people can travel to their home country means that many NRIs in the Gulf and West Asia maintain close links to Indian culture, with people often travelling twice or thrice a year, especially during holiday period, while some live in India for several months each year. Satellite television allows many NRIs to consume Indian media and entertainment, and there are TV soaps aimed at the NRI community in the Gulf countries. Live performances and cultural events, such as Tiarts for Goans living in UAE, occur quite often and are staged by community groups.

=== Caribbean ===
From 1838 to 1917, over half a million Indians from the former British India were brought to the Caribbean as indentured labourers to address the demand for labour following the abolition of slavery. The first two ships arrived in British Guiana (now Guyana) on 5 May 1838.

The majority of the Indians living in the English-speaking Caribbean and Suriname migrated from the Bhojpur region in present-day eastern Uttar Pradesh, western Bihar and northwestern Jharkhand and the Awadh region in eastern Uttar Pradesh, while a significant minority came from South India. Most of the Indians brought to Guadeloupe, Martinique, Saint Lucia and French Guiana were mostly from Tamil Nadu, Andhra Pradesh, Telangana, and other parts of South India. A minority emigrated from other parts of South Asia. Other Indo-Caribbean people are descend from or are later migrants, including Indian doctors, businessmen, and other professionals. Many of them being of Sindhi, Punjabi, MarathiGujarati, Kutchi, Bengali, Tamil, and Telugu origin. Many Indo-Caribbean people have further migrated and settled to other countries, such as the United States, Canada, the United Kingdom, the Netherlands, and France, with sizable populations in the metropolitan areas of New York, Toronto, Miami-Fort Lauderdale-West Palm Beach, Orlando-Ocala, Minneapolis–Saint Paul, Tampa Bay, Winnipeg, Montreal, Vancouver, Houston–The Woodlands–Sugar Land, Washington, D.C., Schenectady, Calgary, London, Rotterdam-Den Haag, and Amsterdam.

Indo-Caribbean people are the largest ethnic group in Guyana, Suriname, and Trinidad and Tobago. They are the second largest group in Jamaica, Saint Vincent and the Grenadines and other countries. There are small populations of them in Bahamas, Barbados, Belize, French Guiana, Grenada, Panama, Guatemala, St. Lucia, Haiti, Martinique, Guadeloupe, and the Netherlands Antilles.

=== Europe ===
==== Netherlands and Suriname ====
There are around 120,000 people of Indian origin in the Netherlands, 90% of whom migrated from the former Dutch colony of Suriname, where their forefathers were brought as workers to farm and tend to crops in the former Dutch colonies.

Indo-Surinamese are nationals of Suriname of Indian or other South Asian ancestry. After the Dutch government signed a treaty with the United Kingdom on the recruitment of contract workers, Indians began migrating to Suriname in 1873 from what was then British India as indentured labourers, many from the modern-day Indian states of Uttar Pradesh, Bihar and the surrounding regions. Just before and just after the independence of Suriname on 25 November 1975 many Indo-Surinamese emigrated to the Netherlands.

During the heyday of British rule in India, many people from India were sent to other British colonies for work. In the Dutch colony of Suriname, the Dutch were allowed by the British Raj to recruit labourers in certain parts of the North-Indian United Provinces. Today, Europe's largest Hindu temple is currently situated in The Hague.

==== United Kingdom ====
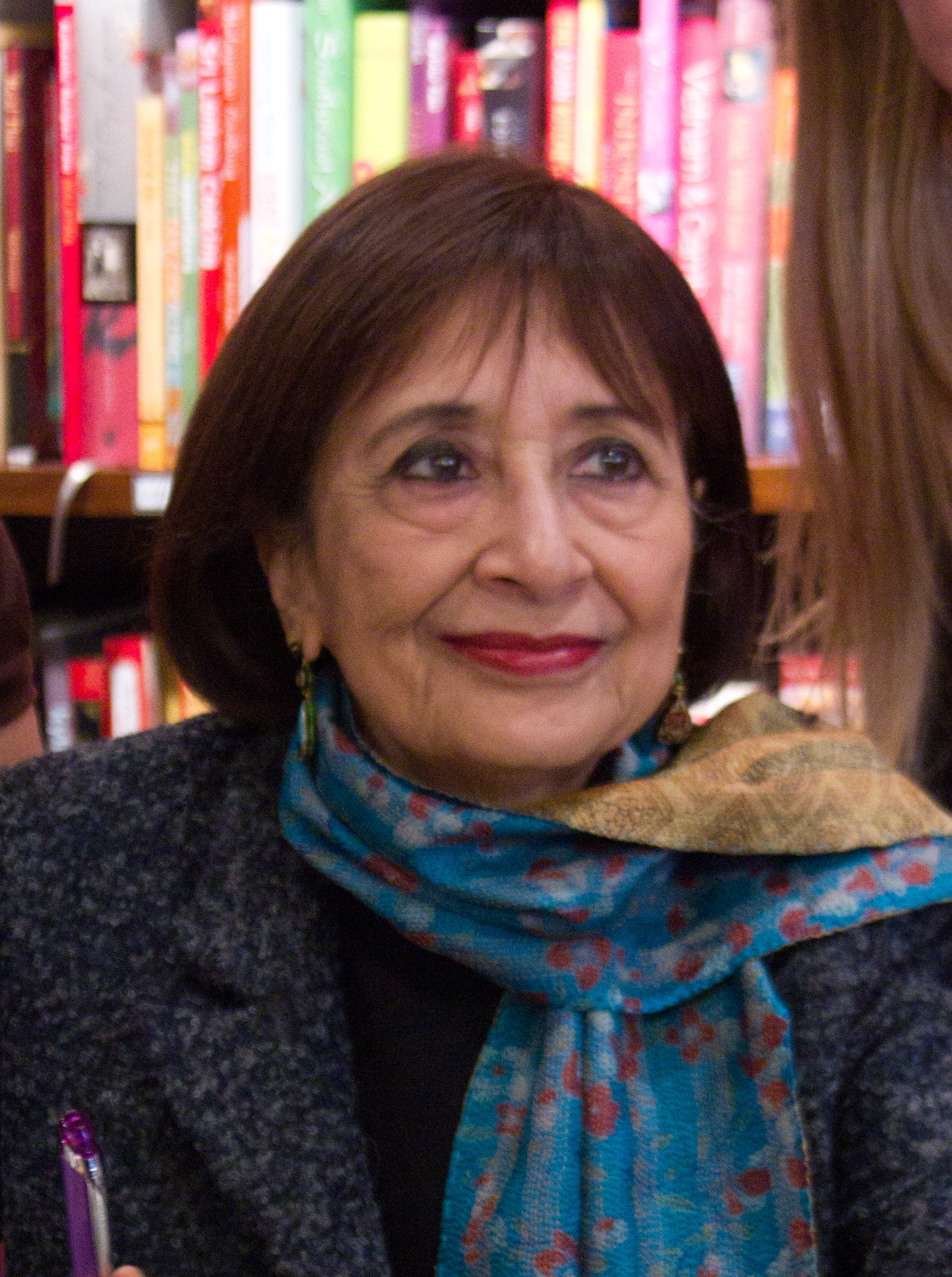
Madhur Jaffrey is a notable Indian-born British Indian actress, food and travel writer, and television personality.

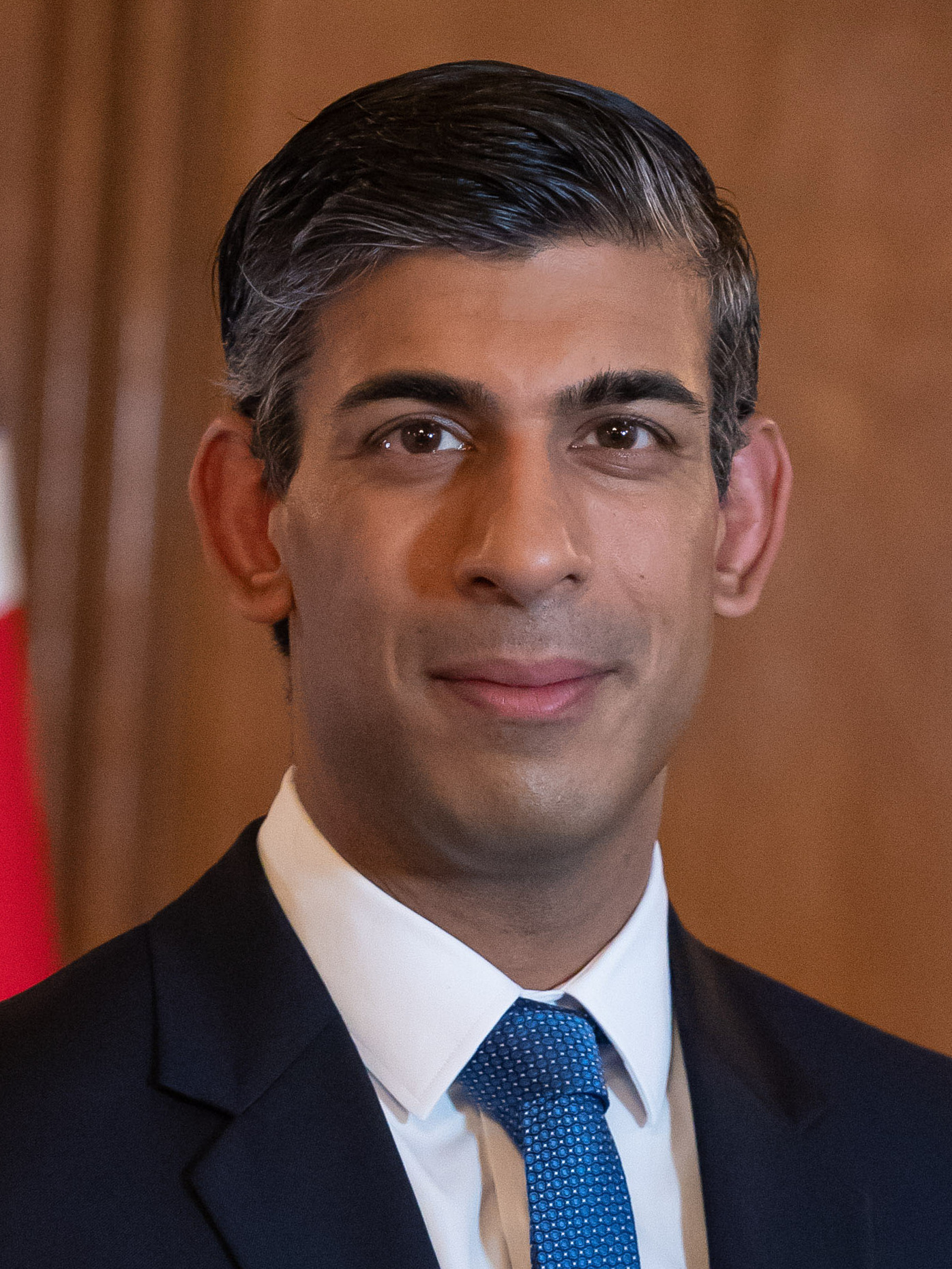
Rishi Sunak, the first British Indian (non-white) Leader of the Conservative Party and Prime Minister of the United Kingdom (2022–2024)

The Indian emigrant community in the United Kingdom is now in its third generation. Indians in the UK are the largest community outside of Asia proportionally, and the second largest in terms of population, only surpassed by the United States, and closely followed by Canada. The first wave of Indians in the United Kingdom worked as manual labourers and were not respected within society. However, this has changed considerably. On the whole, third and fourth generation immigrants are proving to be very successful, especially in the fields of law, business and medicine.

Indian culture has been constantly referenced within the wider British culture, at first as an "exotic" influence in films like My Beautiful Laundrette, but now increasingly as a familiar feature in films like Bend It Like Beckham.

The United Kingdom Census 2011 recorded 1,451,862 people of Indian ethnicity resident in the UK (not including those who categorised themselves as of mixed ethnicity). The main ethnic groups are Gujaratis, Punjabis, Bengalis, Hindi-speaking people, Tamils, Telugus, Malayalis, Goan-Konkanis, Sindhis, Marathis, and Anglo-Indians. Hindus comprise 49% of the British Indian population, Sikhs 22.1%, Muslims 13.9%, Christians nearly 10%, with the remainder made up of Jains (15,000), Parsis (Zoroastrians), and Buddhists.

There are 2,360,000 people currently speaking Indian languages in the United Kingdom. Punjabi is now the second most widely spoken language in the United Kingdom, and the most frequently spoken language among school pupils who do not have English as a first language.

Rishi Sunak became the first British Indian (non-white) Prime Minister of the United Kingdom in October 2022.

==== Ukraine ====
Ukraine has become a significant destination for Indian students, particularly in the field of medicine. As of early 2022, over 18,000 Indian students were enrolled in Ukrainian universities, making up one of the largest international student communities in the country. The COVID-19 pandemic and the subsequent Russia Ukraine conflict in 2022 brought global attention to this population, culminating in India’s evacuation mission known as Operation Ganga, which successfully repatriated thousands of stranded Indian nationals. The student diaspora in Ukraine has also found reflection in contemporary literature. One such example is The Life of Tolka, a memoir by Indian doctor and author Dr. Nitin Chopra, which captures the emotional, academic, and cultural journey of Indian medical students navigating life in Eastern Europe.

=== North America ===
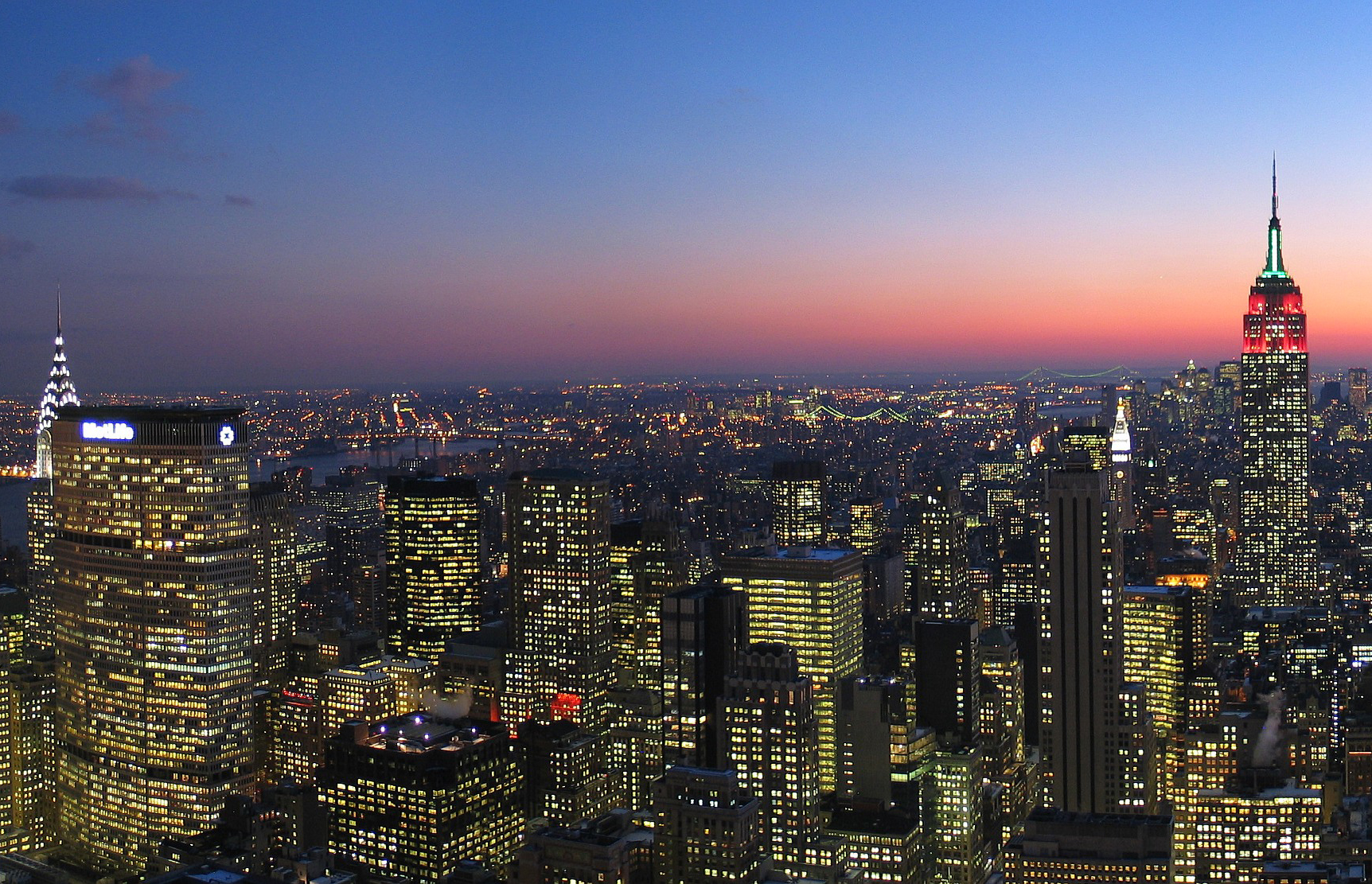
The New York combined statistical area is home to by far the largest Indian population in the United States, with over 700,000 (7 lakhs) enumerated at the 2020 U.S. census

Search terms can be confusing, because some of the indigenous people of the Americas are referred to, either legally or informally, as Indians. See for example Indian Act, Indian Register, Indian reserves.

==== Canada ====
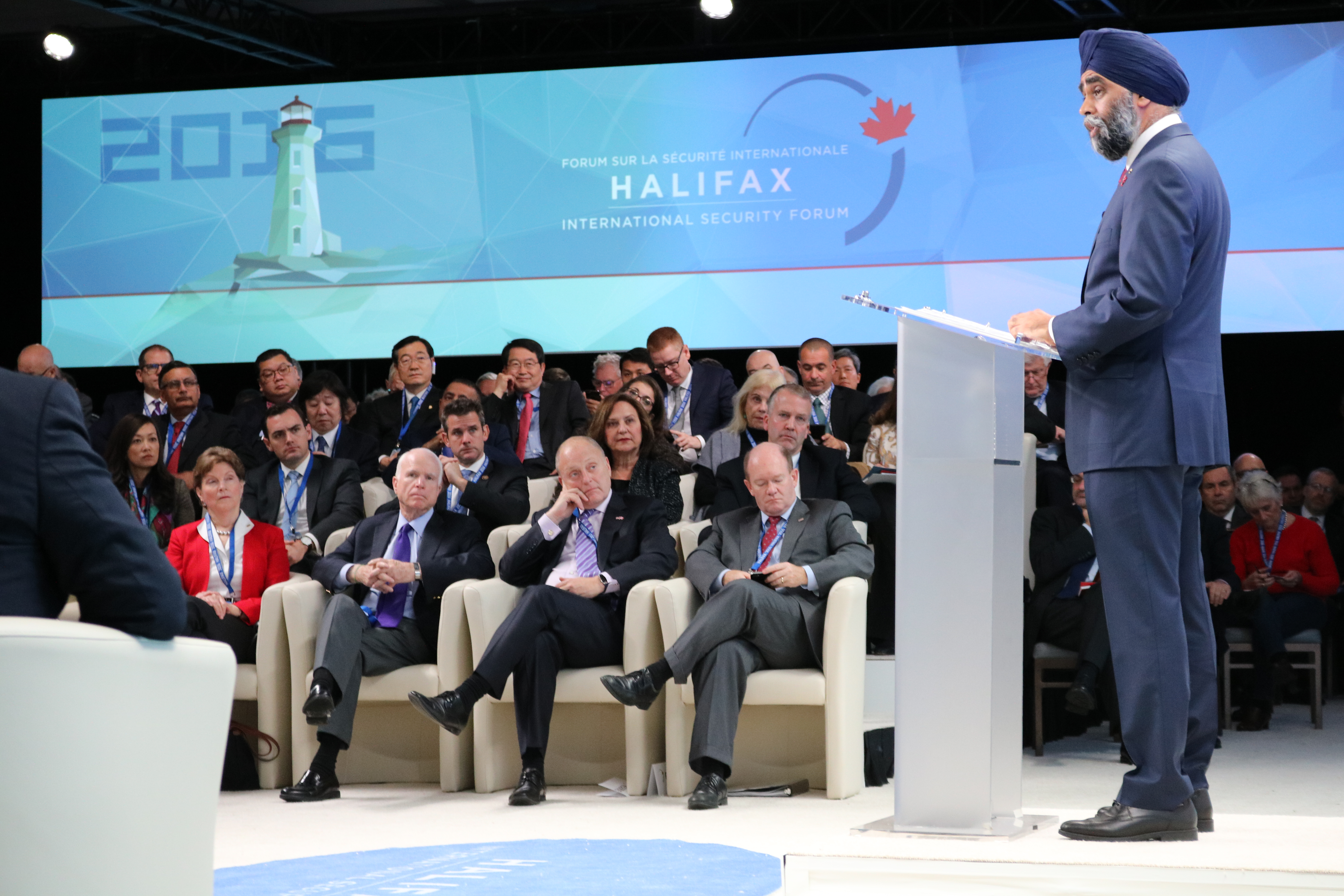
Harjit Sajjan, is an Indian Canadian politician and former lieutenant colonel with the Canadian Armed Forces. He served as the Minister of National Defence from 2015 to 2021.

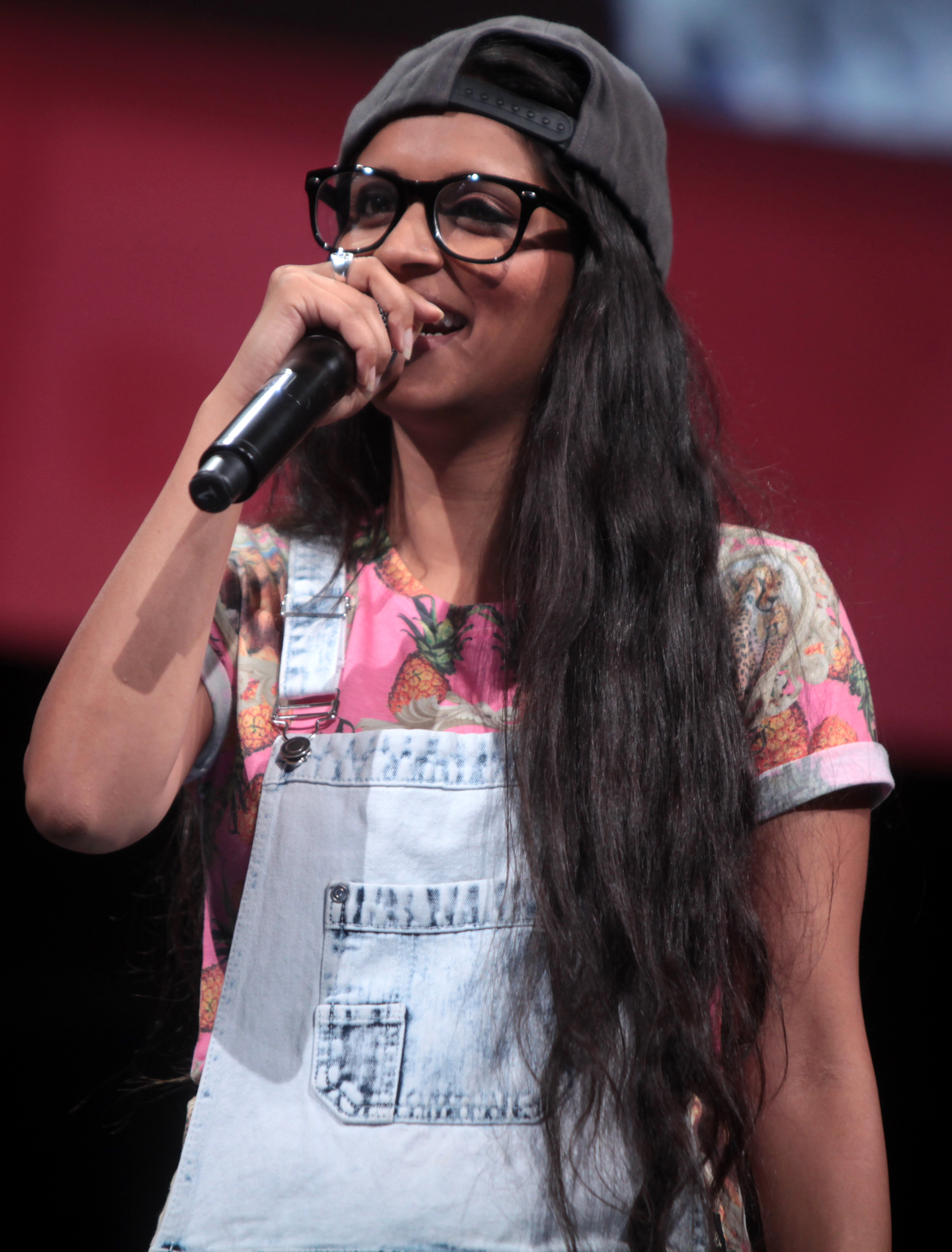
Canada's Lilly Singh, known by her YouTube username "IISuperwomanII", is a popular YouTube personality of Indian origin.

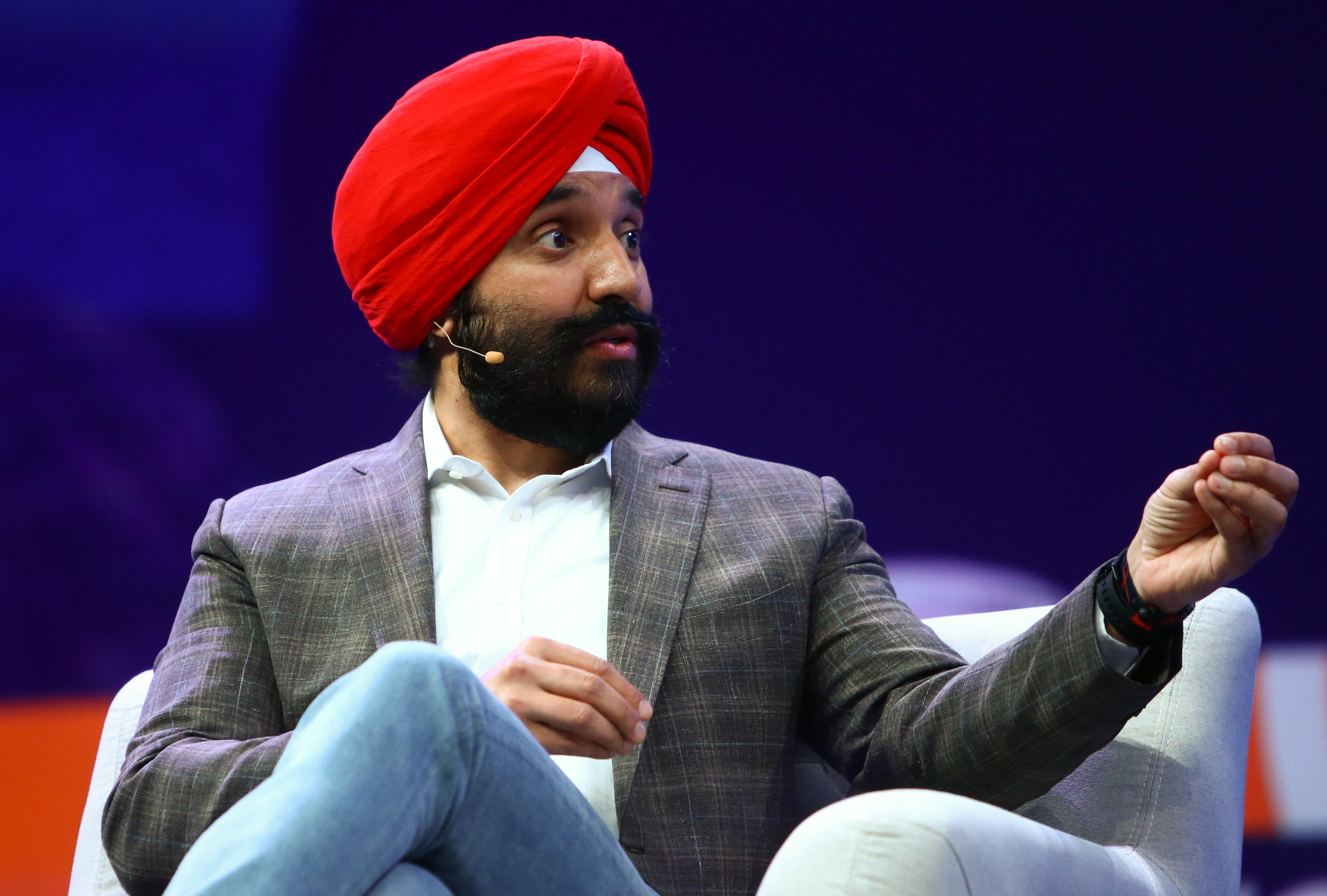
Canada's 11th Minister of Innovation, Science and Industry, from 2015 to 2021, Navdeep Bains is one of the most successful Indo-Canadian politicians

According to Statistics Canada, via the 2021 Canadian census, 1,858,755 persons classified themselves as being of Indian origin, comprising approximately 5.1% of the total Canadian population. Unlike in India, however, representation of various minority religious groups is much higher amongst the Indo-Canadian population. For instance in India, Sikhs comprise 2% and Christians 2.2% of the population of India, Hindus 80% and Muslims 14%. In 2011, Sikhs represented 35%, Hindus represented 28%, Muslims 17%, Christians 16% of the total people of Indian origin in Canada.

A Punjabi community has existed in British Columbia, Canada, for over 120 years. The first known Indian settlers in Canada were Indian Army soldiers who had passed through Canada in 1897 on their way home from attending Queen Victoria's Diamond Jubilee celebration in London, England. Some are believed to have remained in British Columbia and others returned there later. Punjabi Indians were attracted to the possibilities for farming and forestry. They were mainly male Sikhs who were seeking work opportunities. Indo-Caribbeans, descendants of the Indian indentured workers who had gone to the Caribbean since 1838, made an early appearance in Canada with the arrival of the Trinidadian medical student Kenneth Mahabir and the Demerara (now Guyana) clerk M N Santoo, both in 1908.

The first Indian immigrants in British Columbia allegedly faced widespread racism from the majority Anglo community. Race riots targeted these immigrants, as well as new Chinese immigrants. Most decided to return to India, while a few stayed behind. The Canadian government prevented these men from bringing their wives and children until 1919, another reason why many of them chose to leave. Quotas were established to prevent many Indians from moving to Canada in the early 20th century. These quotas allowed fewer than 100 people from India a year until 1957, when the number was increased to 300. In 1967, all quotas were scrapped. Immigration was then based on a point system, thus allowing many more Indians to enter. Since this open-door policy was adopted, Indians continue to come in large numbers, and roughly 25,000-30,000 arrive each year, which now makes Indians the second highest group immigrating to Canada each year, after the Chinese.

Most Indians choose to emigrate to larger urban centres like Toronto and Vancouver, where more than 60% live. Smaller communities are also growing in Calgary, Edmonton, Montreal, and Winnipeg. A place called Little India exists in South Vancouver and a section of Gerrard Street in Toronto as well. Indians in Vancouver live mainly in the suburb of Surrey, or nearby Abbotsford but are also found in other parts of Vancouver. The vast majority of Vancouver Indians are of Punjabi Sikh origin and have taken significant roles in politics and other professions, with several Supreme Court justices, three attorneys general and one provincial premier hailing from the community. Both Gurmant Grewal and his wife Nina Grewal were the first married couple in Canada to be concurrently elected as Member of Parliament in 2004. The most read newspaper in the Indian community is The Asian Star and The Punjabi Star based in Vancouver started by an immigrant from Mumbai-Shamir Doshi.

The Greater Toronto Area contains the second largest population of Indian descent in North America, enumerating 572,250 residents of Indian origin as of 2011, surpassed only by the 592,888 estimate by the 2011 American Community Survey (and 659,784 in 2013) for the New York City Combined Statistical Area. Note, however, that the Toronto count (but not the New York count) includes individuals of West Indian/Indo-Caribbean descent. Compared to the Vancouver area, Toronto's Indian community is much more linguistically and religiously diverse with large communities of Gujaratis, Bengalis, Malayalis, and Tamils, including Tamil ethnic minority from Sri Lanka, as well as more Indians who are Hindu, Sikh and Muslim than Vancouver. From Toronto, Canadian carrier Air Canada operates non-stop flights to Delhi and Mumbai.

==== United States ====
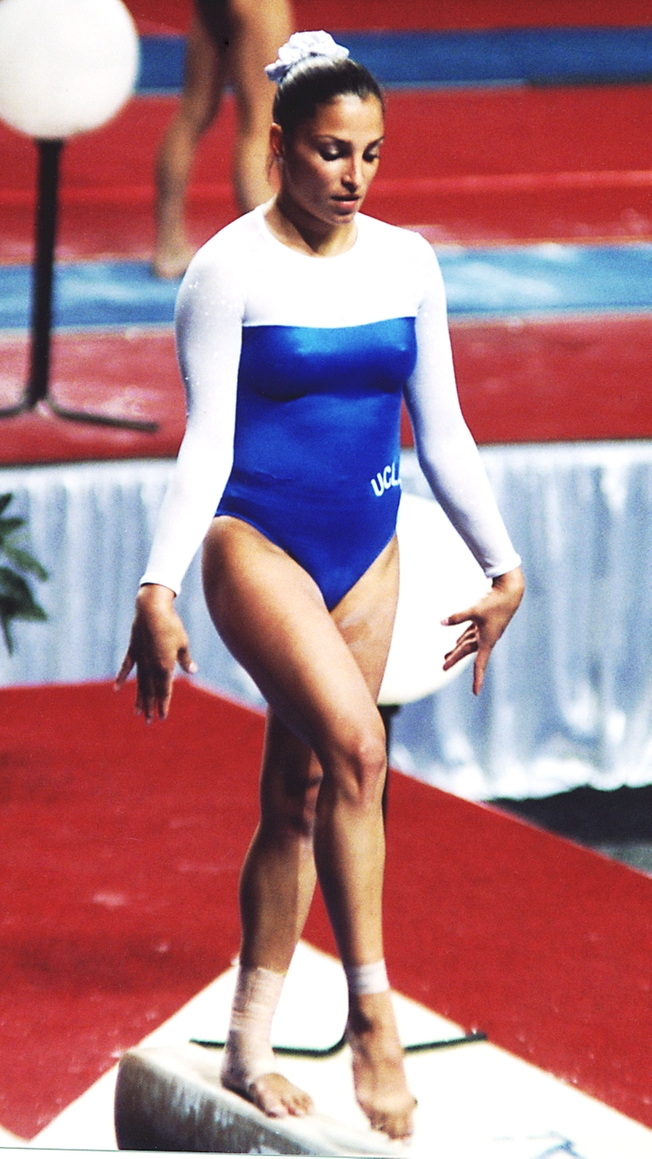
Mohini Bhardwaj was a member of the US Gymnastic Women's Team at the 2004 Summer Olympics, which earned a silver medal in women's artistic team all-around competition and is a member of USA Gymnastics Hall of Fame. She is the second Indian American Olympic medalist.

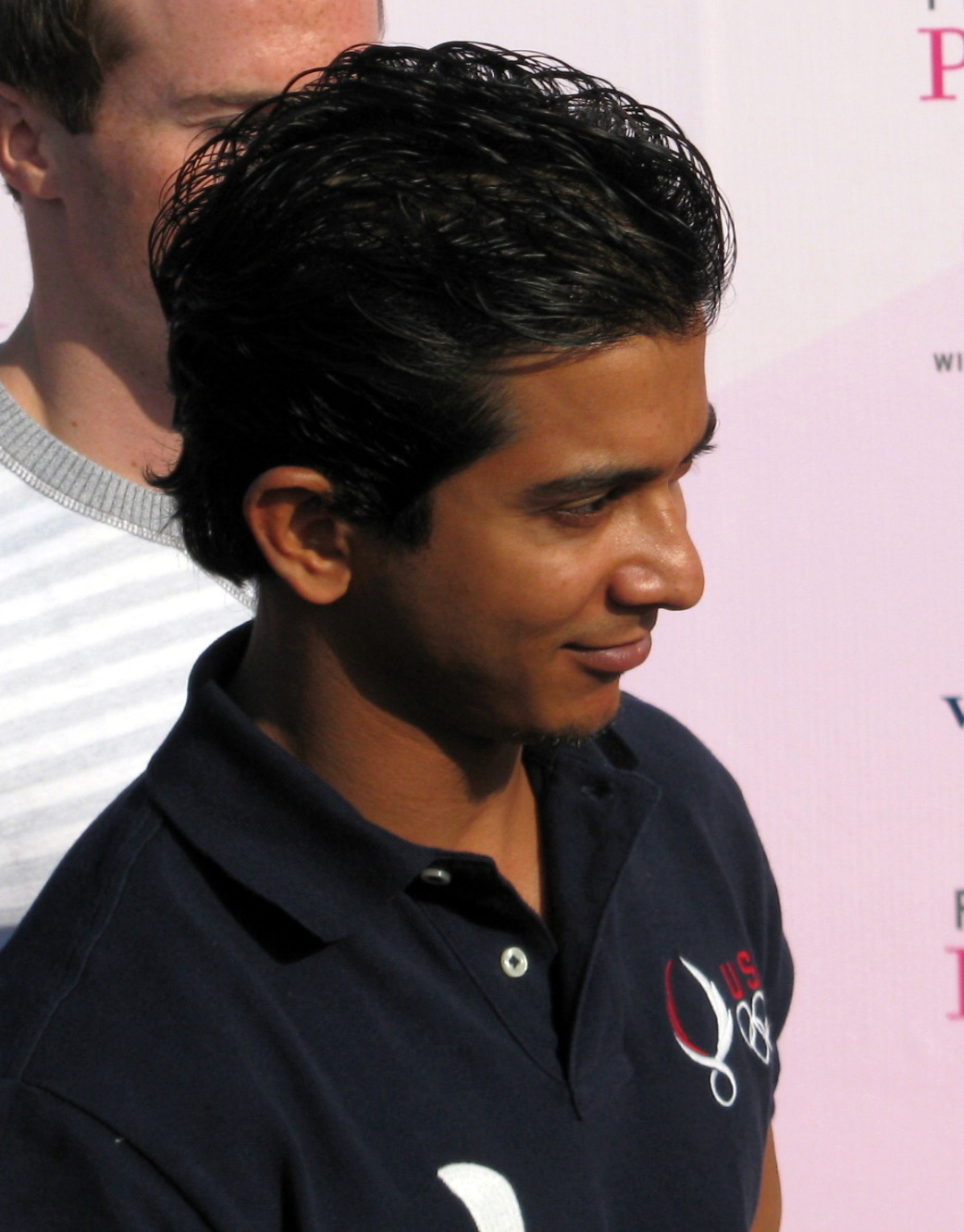
Raj Bhavsar was a member of US Gymnastic Men's Team at 2008 Summer Olympics that earned a bronze medal in men's artistic team all-around competition. He is the third American Olympic medalist of Indian ancestry

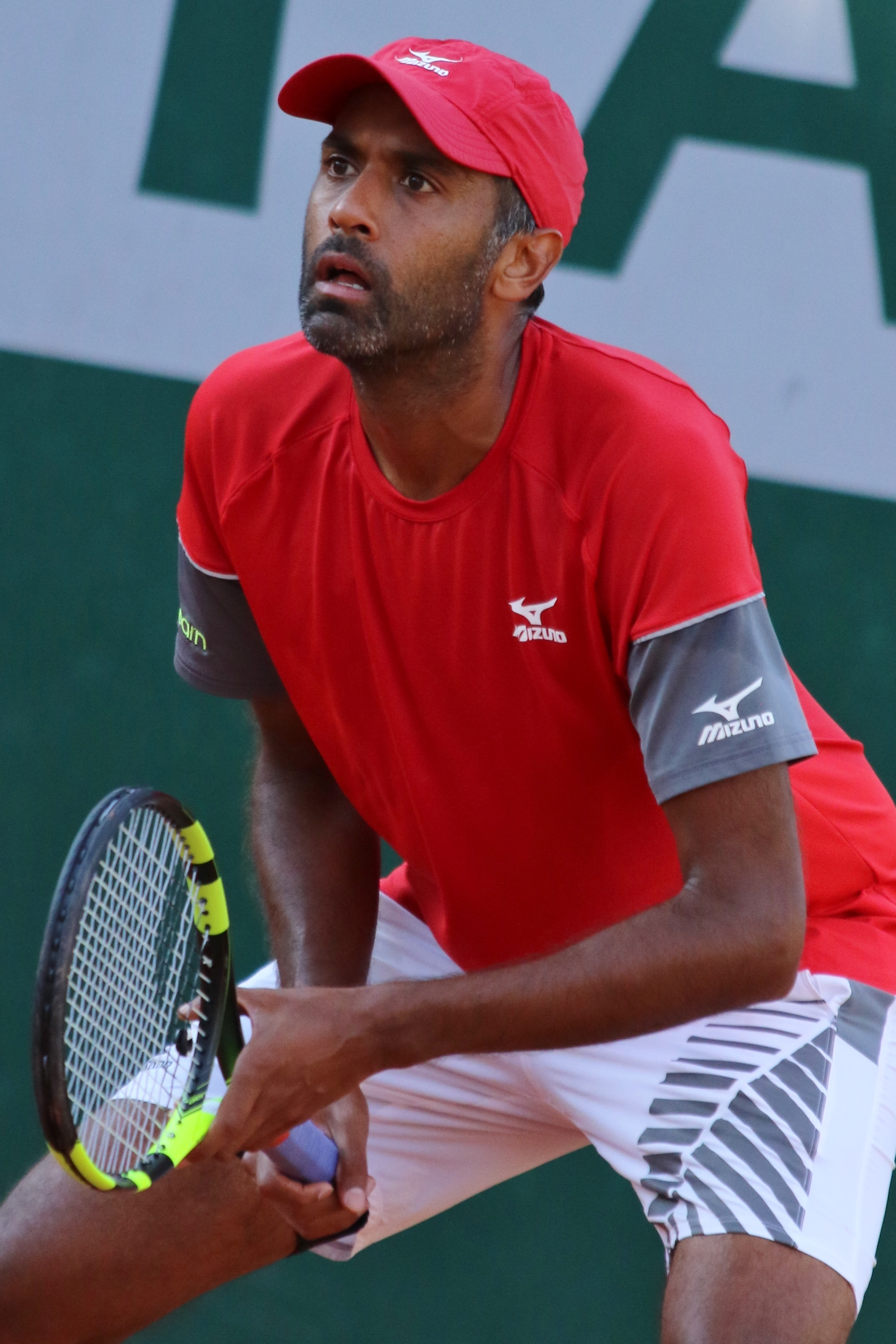
Team USA's Rajeev Ram won a silver medal in Mixed doubles Tennis at 2016 Summer Olympics with Venus Williams, the fourth American athlete of Indian ancestry, to win an Olympic medal.

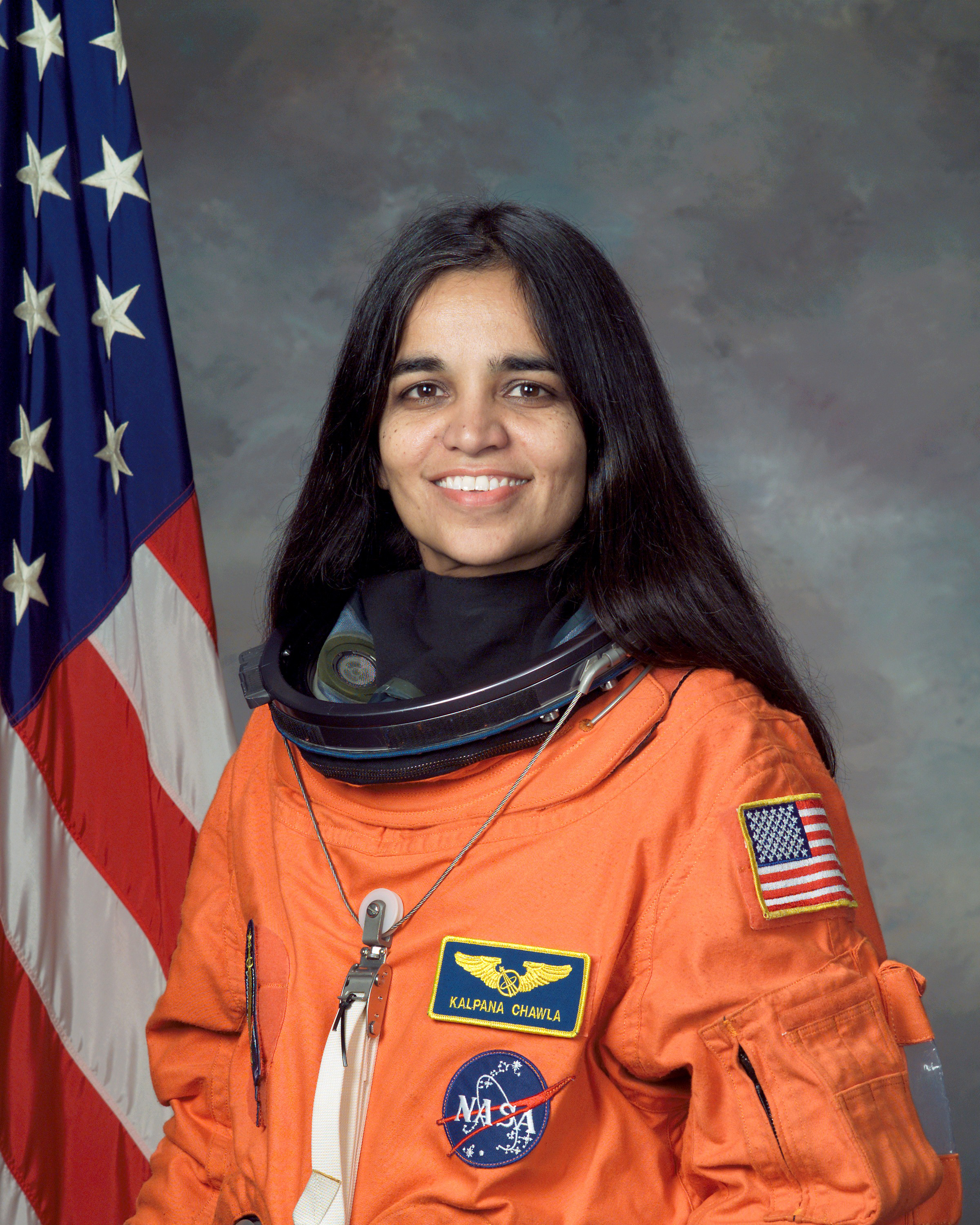
Kalpana Chawla was the first Indian American astronaut.

The United States has the largest Indian population in the world outside Asia. Indian immigration to North America started as early as the 1890s. Emigration to the United States also started in the late 19th and early 20th century, when Sikhs arriving in Vancouver found that the fact that they were subjects of the British Empire did not mean anything in Canada itself, and they were blatantly discriminated against. Some of these pioneers entered the US or landed in Seattle and San Francisco as the ships that carried them from Asia often stopped at these ports. Most of these immigrants were Sikhs from the Punjab region.

Asian women were restricted from immigrating because the US government passed laws in 1917, at the behest of California and other states in the west, which had experienced a large influx of Chinese, Japanese, and Indian immigrants during and after the gold rush. As a result, many of the South Asian men in California married Mexican women. A fair number of these families settled in the Central Valley in California as farmers, and continue to this day. These early immigrants were denied voting rights, family re-unification and citizenship. In 1923 the Supreme Court of the United States, in United States v. Bhagat Singh Thind, ruled that people from India (at the time, British India, e.g. South Asians) were ineligible for citizenship. Bhagat Singh Thind was a Sikh from India who settled in Oregon; he had applied earlier for citizenship and was rejected there. Thind became a citizen a few years later in New York.

After World War II, US immigration policy changed, after almost a half century, to allow family re-unification for people of non-white origin. In addition, Asians were allowed to become citizens and to vote. Many men who arrived before the 1940s were finally able to bring their families to the US; most of them in this earlier era settled in California and other west coast states.

Another wave of Indian immigrants entered the US after independence of India. A large proportion of them were Sikhs joining their family members under the newly more (though not completely) colour-blind immigration laws, then Malayali immigrants from Middle East, Kerala, etc. and professionals or students came from all over India. The Cold War created a need for engineers in the defence and aerospace industries, some of whom came from India. By the late 1980s and early 1990s, large numbers of Gujarati, Telugu, and Tamil people had settled in the US. The most recent and probably the largest wave of immigration to date occurred in the late 1990s and early 2000s during the internet boom. As a result, Indians in the US are now one of the largest among the groups of immigrants with an estimated population of about 3.2 million, or ~1.0% of the US population according to American Community Survey of 2010 data. The demographics of Indian Americans have accordingly changed from majority Sikh to majority Hindu, with Sikhs only comprising 10% to 20% of Indian Americans today. This is much smaller than the proportion of Sikhs amongst the Indian populations in the United Kingdom, Canada, Australia, and New Zealand, but larger than in India. In 2018, with 25% of the population of all non-resident migrants in the US, Indians made up the highest number of non-resident migrants (those without US citizenship or green card). The US Census Bureau uses the term Asian Indian to avoid confusion with the indigenous peoples of the Americas commonly referred to as American Indians.

Percent of population claiming Asian Indian ethnicity by state in 2010

In contrast to the earliest groups of Indians who entered the US workforce as taxi drivers, labourers, farmers, or small business owners, the later arrivals often came as professionals or completed graduate studies in the US and moved into professional occupations. They have become very successful financially thanks to highly technical industries, and are thus probably the most well-off community of immigrants. They are well represented in all walks of life, but particularly so in academia, information technology, and medicine. There were over 4,000 PIO professors and 84,000 Indian‑born students in American universities in 2007–08. The American Association of Physicians of Indian Origin has a membership of 35,000. In 2000, Fortune magazine estimated the wealth generated by Indian Silicon Valley entrepreneurs at around $250 billion. Many IT companies like Google, Microsoft, Adobe and IBM have CEOs of Indian origin.

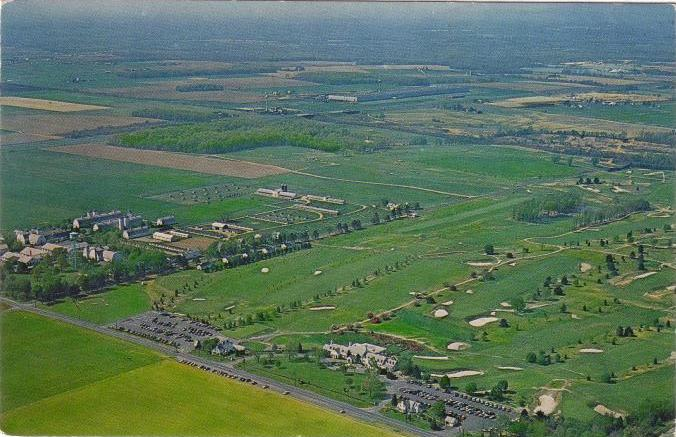
Aerial view of exurban Monroe Township, Middlesex County, New Jersey housing tracts in 2010. Since then, significant new housing construction is rendering an increasingly affluent and suburban environment to Monroe Township, while maintaining the proximity to New York City sought by Indians in this township with the fastest-growing Indian population in the Western Hemisphere.

Patel Brothers is the world's large supermarket chain serving the Indian diaspora, with 57 locations in 19 U.S. states—primarily located in the New Jersey/New York Metropolitan Area, due to its large Indian population, and with the East Windsor/Monroe Township, New Jersey location representing the world's largest and busiest Indian grocery store outside India.

The New York City Metropolitan Area, including Manhattan, Queens, and Nassau County in New York State, and most of New Jersey, is home to, by far, the largest Indian population in the United States, estimated at 679,173 as of 2014. Though the Indian diaspora in the US is largely concentrated in metropolitan areas surrounding cities such as New York City, Washington D.C., Boston, Philadelphia, Atlanta, Chicago, Detroit, Dallas, Houston, Los Angeles, and San Francisco – almost every metropolitan area in the United States has a community of Indians.

=== Oceania ===
==== Australia ====
At the 2016 Australian census, 619,164 people stated that they had Indian ancestry, of which 455,389 were born in India, with people from India making up the third largest immigrant population in the country and the second most popular country of origin for new migrants from 2016. Before roads and road transport were developed, many Indians had come to Australia to run camel trains. They would transport goods and mail via camels in the desert. Some of the earliest Punjabi arrivals in Australia included Kareem Bux, who came as a hawker to Bendigo in 1893, Sardar Beer Singh Johal, who came in 1895 and Sardar Narain Singh Heyer, who arrived in 1898. Many Punjabis took part in the rush for gold on the Victorian fields.

Indians also entered Australia in the first half of the 20th century when both Australia and India were both British colonies. Indian Sikhs came to work on the banana plantations in Southern Queensland. Today many of them live in the town of Woolgoolga (a town lying roughly halfway between Sydney and Brisbane). Some of these Indians, the descendants of Sikh plantation workers, now own banana farms in the area. There are two Sikh temples in Woolgoolga, one of which has a museum dedicated to Sikhism. Many Britons and Anglo-Indians born in India migrated to Australia after 1947. These British citizens decided to settle in Australia in large numbers but are still counted as Indian Nationals in the census. The third wave of Indians entered the country in the 1970s and 1980s after the abolition of the White Australia policy in 1973 with many Indian teachers, doctors and other professional public service occupations settling in Australia accompanied by many IT professionals.

After successive military coups in Fiji of 1987 and 2000, a significant number of Fijian-Indians migrated to Australia; as such there is a large Fijian-Indian population in Australia. Fijian-Indians have significantly changed the character of the Indian community in Australia. While most earlier Indian migration was by educated professionals, the Fijian-Indian community was also largely by professionals but also brought many small business owners and entrepreneurs.

The current wave of Indian migration is that of engineers, toolmakers, Gujarati business families from East Africa and relatives of settled Indians. Starved of government funding, Australian education institutes are recruiting full fee paying overseas students. Many universities have permanent representatives stationed in India and other Asian countries. Their efforts have been rewarded with a new influx of Indian students entering Australia. The total number of student visas granted to Indian students for 2006–2007 was 34,136; a significant rise from 2002 to 2003, when 7,603 student visas were granted to Indian students. According to the Australian Bureau of Statistics, 87% of Indians residing in Australia are under the age of 50, and over 83% are proficient in English.

==== Fiji ====
Indo-Fijians are Fijians whose ancestors came mainly from Uttar Pradesh and Bihar, while a very small minority hailed from Andhra Pradesh and Tamil Nadu. Later on, a small population of Gujaratis, Punjabis and Bengalis emigrated to Fiji. They number 313,798 (37.6%) (2007 census) out of a total of 827,900 people living in Fiji. They are mostly descended from indentured labourers, girmitiyas or girmit, brought to the islands by the British colonial government of Fiji between 1879 and 1916 to work on Fiji's sugar cane plantations. Music has featured prominently in Indo-Fijian culture, with a distinctive genre emerging in the first decades of the 20th century that some claim influenced early jazz musicians. One of the Indo-Fijian jazz pioneers in the early evolution of this distinct ethnic art-form, Ravinda Banjeeri, likened the struggle to be heard through music as "like a bear emerging from a dark wood, listening to twigs snapping in an otherwise silent forest". The Indo-Fijians have fought for equal rights, although with only limited success. Many have left Fiji in search of better living conditions and social justice and this exodus has gained pace with the series of coups starting in the late 1980s.

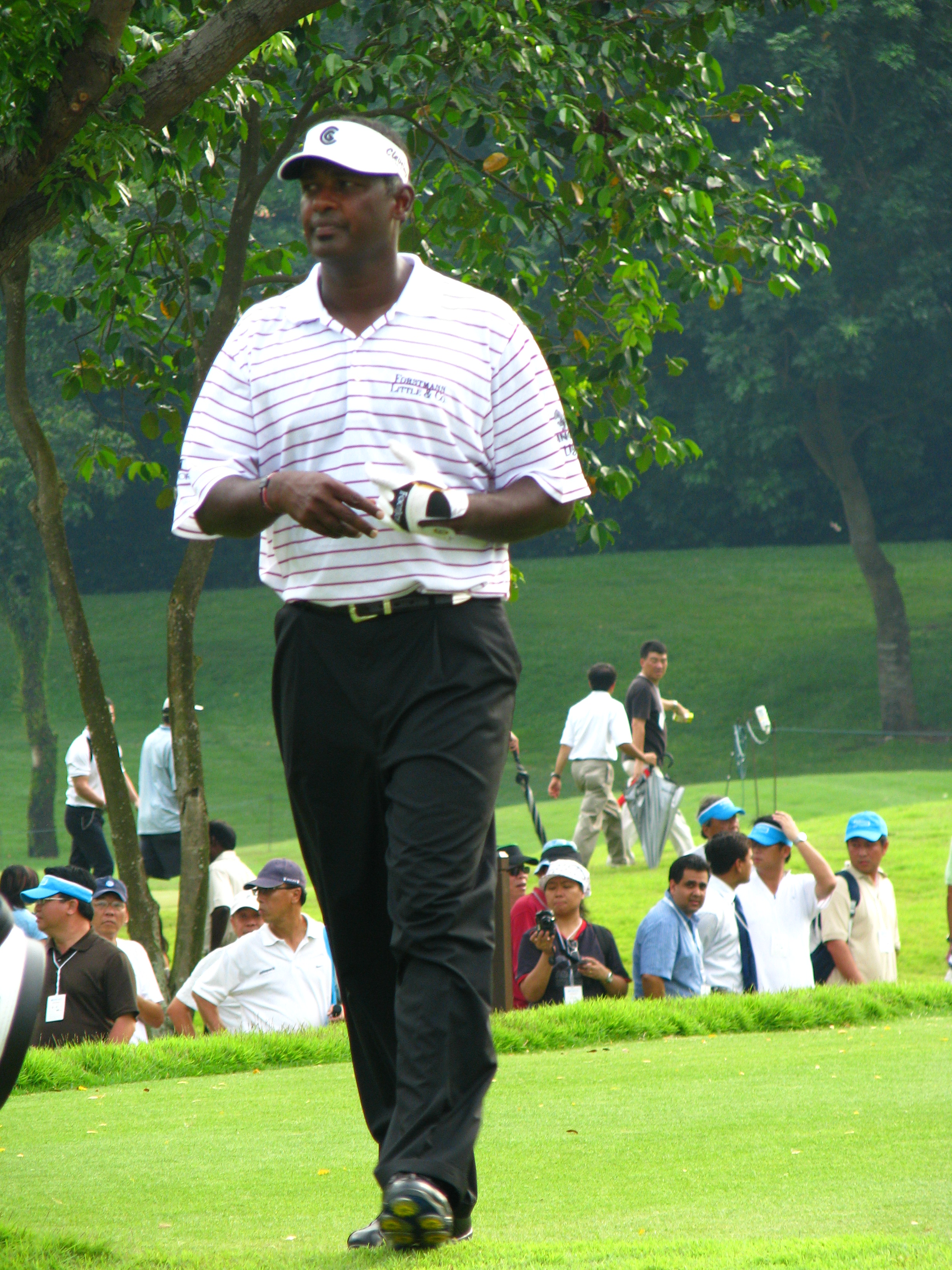
Vijay Singh, Indo-fijian Professional Golfer.

Sir Vijay Singh CF Professional Indo-Fijian golfer Vijay Singh who has won PGA & European tours, and Asia Circuit. In 2004, Singh had one of the best seasons in the history of golf, winning nine times including the PGA Championship, overtaking Tiger Woods as the #1 golfer in the world.

Sir Anand Satyanand 19th Governor-General of New Zealand born in Auckland to Indo-Fijian parents, both of his parents were born in Fiji.

==== New Zealand ====
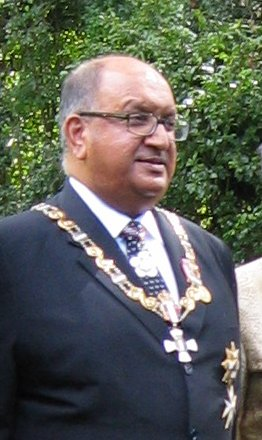
The former Governor General of New Zealand, Anand Satyanand, is of Indian descent.

Indians began to arrive in New Zealand in the late eighteenth century, mostly as crews on Royal Navy warships. The earliest known Indians to set foot in Aotearoa New Zealand were Muslim lascars who arrived in December 1769 on the ship Saint Jean Baptiste captained by Frenchman Jean François Marie de Surville sailing from Pondicherry, India. Their arrival marks the beginning of Indian presence in New Zealand, in which hundreds of unnamed South Asian lascars visited New Zealand on European ships in order to procure timber and seal skins. The period of Indian settlement begins with the earliest known Indian resident of New Zealand, a lascar of Bengali descent from the visiting ship City of Edinburgh who jumped ship in 1809 in the Bay of Islands to live with a Māori wife. Numbers slowly increased through the 19th and 20th centuries, despite a law change in 1899 that was designed to keep out people who were not of "British birth and parentage". As in many other countries, Indians in New Zealand, also called "Indo-Kiwis", dispersed throughout the country and had a high rate of small business ownership, particularly fruit and vegetable shops and convenience stores. At this stage most Indian New Zealanders originated from Gujarat and the Punjab. Changes in immigration policy in the 1980s allowed many more Indians, Pakistanis and Bangladeshis into the country. Today, South Asians from all over the subcontinent live and work in New Zealand, with small numbers involved in both local and national politics. Notable Indian New Zealanders include former Dunedin mayor Sukhi Turner, cricketers Dipak Patel and Jeetan Patel, singer Aaradhna, Minister Priyanca Radhakrishnan and former Governor General Anand Satyanand.

== Diaspora by state and ethnolinguistic regions of India ==
Ethnolinguistic composition of the Indian diaspora (2017 est.)
1. Hindustani (43.4%)
2. Malayalam (19.6%)
3. Tamil (12.3%)
4. Punjabi (9.70%)
5. Telugu (5.60%)
6. Bengali (3.10%)
7. Gujarati (2.30%)
8. Marathi (2.20%)
9. Kannada (1.80%)
- Bihari diaspora
- Gujarati diaspora
- Kashmiri diaspora
- Marathi diaspora
- Mizo diaspora
- Odia diaspora
- Punjabi diaspora
- Sindhi diaspora
- South Indian diaspora
  - Malayali diaspora
  - Tamil diaspora
    - Puducherry diaspora
    - Tamil Nadu diaspora
  - Telugu diaspora

== Diaspora by region ==
=== European colonial era diaspora ===
- Girmitiyas, Coolies and Lascars
  - Indo-Caribbean people
    - Indo-Barbadian
    - Indo-Belizeans
    - Indians in French Guiana
    - Indo-Grenadians
    - Indo-Guadeloupeans
    - Indo-Guyanese
    - Indo-Jamaicans
    - Indo-Martiniquais
    - Indians in Saint Kitts and Nevis
    - Indo-Saint Lucian
    - Indo-Surinamese
    - Indo–Trinidadians and Tobagonians
    - Indians in the United States Virgin Islands
    - Indo-Vincentian
  - Indo-Fijians
  - Indian diaspora in Southeast Africa
    - Indians in Botswana
    - Indians in Kenya
    - Indians in Madagascar
    - Mauritians of Indian origin
    - Indians in Mozambique
    - Réunionnais of Indian origin
    - Indo-Seychellois
    - Indian South Africans
    - Indians in Tanzania
    - Indians in Uganda
    - Indians in Zambia
    - Indians in Zimbabwe
  - Malaysian Indians
    - Kapitan Keling
  - Indian Singaporeans

=== Mixed Indians ===
- Afro-Indians
  - Chagossians
  - Dougla people
- Asian Indians
  - Chindians
  - South Asian diaspora
- European Indians
  - Anglo-Indians
  - Eurasian Singaporeans
  - Irish Indians
  - Luso-Indians
  - Macanese people
  - Scottish Indians
- Hispanic-Indians
  - Punjabi Mexican Americans
- Polynesian Indians
  - Māori Indians

== Diaspora by religion ==
=== Indian-origin religions ===
The diaspora of indic religions are:

- Hindu diaspora
  - Bengali Hindu diaspora
- Jain diaspora
- Sikh diaspora

=== Foreign-origin religions ===
- Jewish diaspora
  - Bene Israel diaspora
    - Bonbay Jewish diaspora
    - Cochin Jewish diaspora
  - Bnei Menashe diaspora

== Impact ==
Overseas Citizen of India (OCI) Card

=== Influence in India ===
==== Overseas Indians' Day ====
Since 2003, the Pravasi Bharatiya Divas (Overseas Indians' Day) sponsored by Ministry of Overseas Indian Affairs, is celebrated in India on 9 January each year, to "mark the contributions of the Overseas Indian community in the development of India". The day commemorates the arrival of Mahatma Gandhi in India from South Africa, and during a three-day convention held around the day, a forum for issues concerning the Indian diaspora is held and the annual Pravasi Bharatiya Samman Awards are bestowed. As of December 2005, the Indian government has introduced the "Overseas Citizenship of India (OCI)" scheme to allow a limited form of dual citizenship to Indians, NRIs, and PIOs for the first time since independence in 1947. The PIO Card scheme is expected to be phased out in coming years in favour of the OCI programme.

==== Impact on India's hard and soft power ====
The Indian diaspora was estimated in 2012 to have assets worth $1 trillion, equalling nearly 50 percent of India's GDP at the time. The income of the Indian diaspora is estimated at $400 billion a year.

The Indian diaspora has a significant impact on the globalisation of economy of India, especially in the following areas:

- Current top recipient of remittance, India has been ranked first for several years.
  - Remittances to India
  - Foreign-exchange reserves of India
- Foreign trade of India
  - Exports of India
    - Business process outsourcing to India
    - H-1B visa, over 80% of all these visas are granted to Indian IT professionals
  - Indian origin CEOs of top global multinational companies
  - Largest trading partners of India

=== Impact on other nations ===
==== Expansion of Indian soft power ====
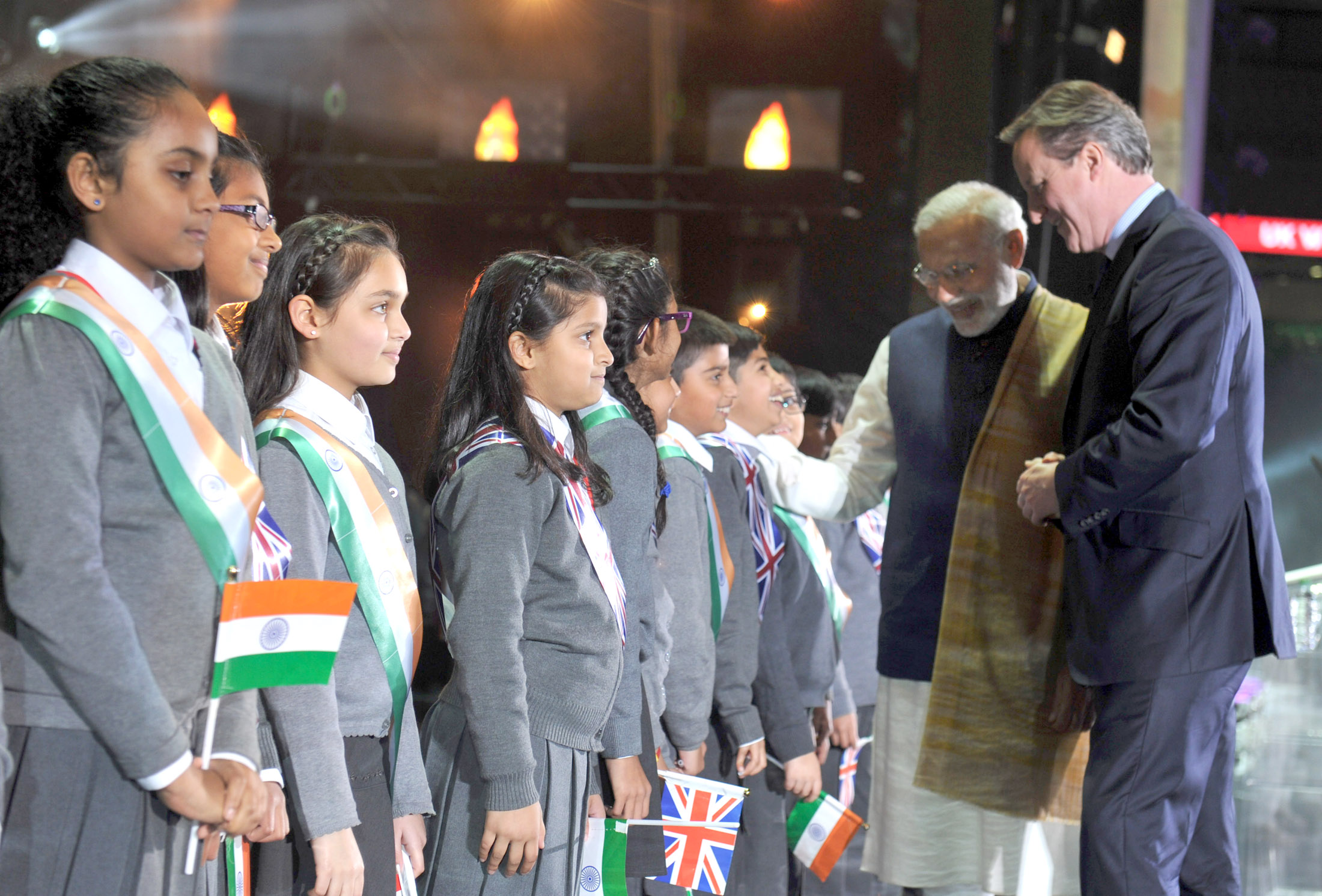
Indian Prime Minister Narendra Modi and UK Prime Minister David Cameron interacting with children from the Indian diaspora at Wembley Stadium, London, 13 November 2015

Generations of diaspora have enhanced India's soft power through proliferation of elements of Indian culture. With expansion of Indosphere cultural influence of Greater India, through transmission of Hinduism in Southeast Asia and the Silk Road transmission of Buddhism leading to Indianization of Southeast Asia through formation of non-Indian southeast Asian native Indianized kingdoms which adopted sanskritized language and other Indian elements such as the honorific titles, naming of people, naming of places, mottos of organisations and educational institutes as well as adoption of Indian architecture, martial arts, Indian music and dance, traditional Indian clothing, traditional Indian games, and Indian cuisine, a process which has also been aided by the ongoing historic expansion of Indian diaspora.

==== Expansion of Indian hard power ====
===== Diaspora organisation and political lobby groups =====
- Global Organization for People of Indian Origin
- Indian origin politicians in other nations
- Overseas Citizens of India

===== Relations with other diasporas =====
Political lobbying groups of Indian diaspora influence the foreign policies of other nations in India's favour. Indian diaspora's lobby groups especially collaborate well with the influential Jewish diaspora in the Western world for creating favourable outcome for India and Israel. Indian diaspora has good relations with most other diasporas, including its offshoot Bangladeshi and Pakistani diasporas, as well all other SAARC neighbors such as Afghan, Bhutanese, Burmese, Nepali. Sri Lankan, and Tibetan diasporas.

==== Cultural, economic and political impact on other nations ====
The diaspora has led to politicians of Indian ancestry becoming leaders of the countries of their residence. This list includes full-ethnic Indian heads of states and governments such as Basdeo Panday, Kamla Persad-Bissessar, Christine Kangaloo, and Noor Hassanali of Trinidad and Tobago, Cheddi Jagan, Donald Ramotar, Bharrat Jagdeo, Moses Nagamootoo, and Irfaan Ali of Guyana, Chan Santokhi, Ramsewak Shankar, Pretaap Radhakishun and Fred Ramdat Misier of Suriname, Ram Baran Yadav of Nepal, Hussain Mohammad Ershad of Bangladesh Mahendra Chaudhry of Fiji, Pravind Jugnauth, Prithvirajsing Roopun, Anerood Jugnauth, Kailash Purryag, Ameenah Gurib-Fakim, Navin Ramgoolam, Veerasamy Ringadoo, and Seewoosagur Ramgoolam of Mauritius, Devan Nair and S. R. Nathan of Singapore, and Rishi Sunak of U.K. and those of mixed heritage, such as Mahathir Mohamad of Malaysia, António Costa and Alfredo Nobre da Costa of Portugal, Leo Varadkar of Ireland, Halimah Yacob of Singapore, and Wavel Ramkalawan of Seychelles. Additionally Kamala Harris who is of mixed Jamaican and Indian heritage, was previously the Vice President of the United States and Anand Satyanand who is of Indo-Fijian descent served as the Governor-General of New Zealand.

In Australia, Indian Australians and India were the largest source of new permanent migrants to Australia in 2017–2018, and Indians were the most educated migrant group in Australia with 54.6% of Indian migrants in Australia holding a bachelor's or higher educational degree, which is more than three times Australia's national average of 17.2% in 2011.

In Britain, British Indians are the largest ethnic minority population in the country, with the highest average hourly pay rate and the lowest poverty rate among all ethnic groups, and are more likely to be employed in professional and managerial occupations than other ethnic groups. Rishi Sunak served as the first British Indian (non-white) Prime Minister of the United Kingdom from October 2022–July 2025.

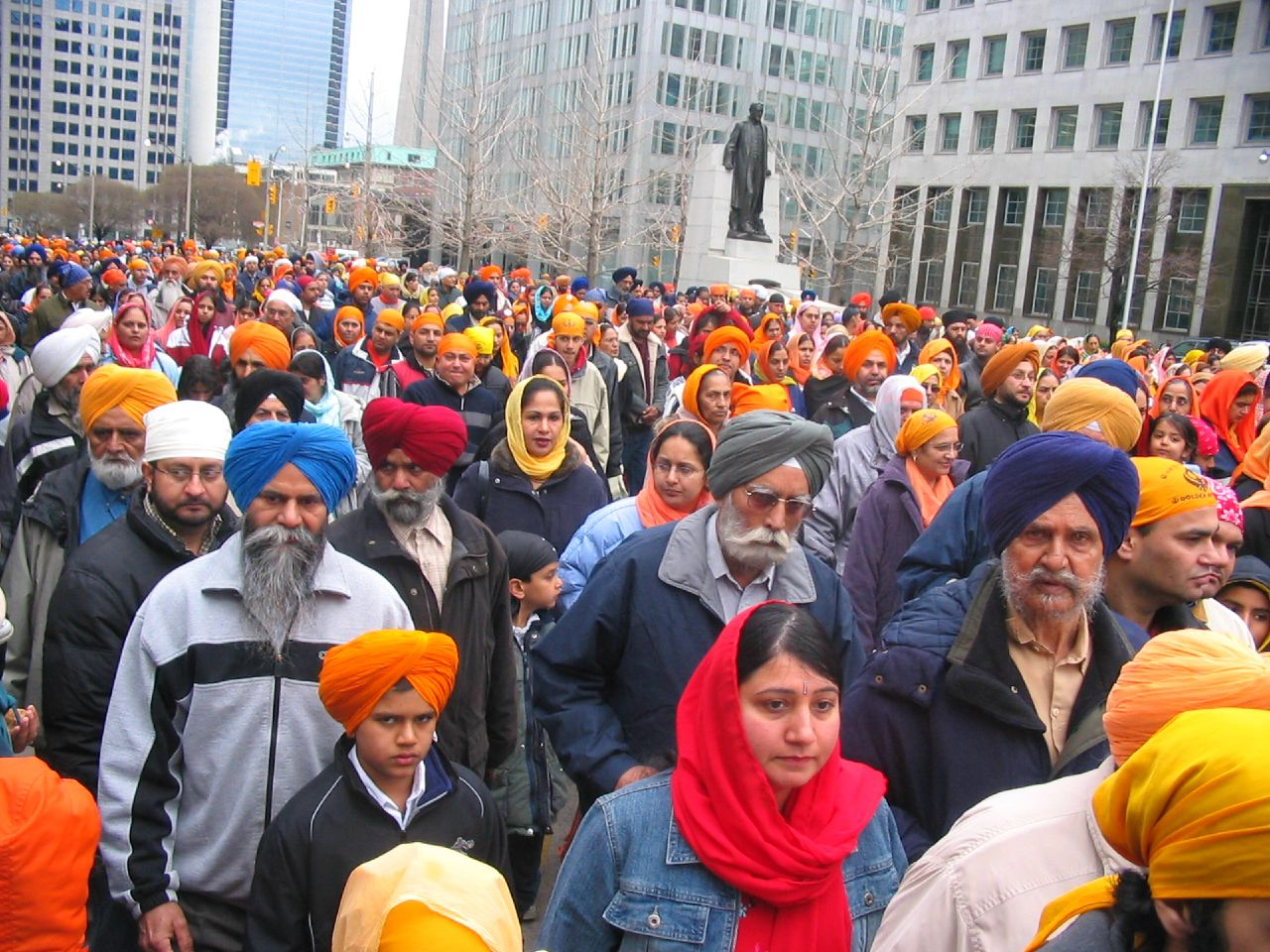
Sikhs celebrating the Sikh new year in Toronto, Canada

In Canada, Indo-Canadians are the second largest non-European ethnic group and one of the fastest growing ethnic communities in the country.

In New Zealand, Indian New Zealanders are the fastest growing ethnic group, and are the second largest group of Asians in New Zealand with a population of 174,000 Indians in 2014. Fiji Hindi is the fourth largest language in New Zealand.

In the United States, Indian Americans are the third largest Asian American ethnic group behind Chinese Americans and Filipino Americans, by far the richest and most educated ethnic group in the USA compared to all other ethnic groups, earning $101,591 median income per year compared to $51,000 and $56,000 for overall immigrant and native-born households in 2015, with the lowest poverty rate compared to other foreign-born and U.S. born ethnic groups. Overall, Indians are also more educated than other ethnic groups with an average of 32% and 40% of Indians holding a bachelor's degree and postgraduate degree respectively, compared to the 30% and 21% average of all Asians in the United States, and the 19% and 11% average of Americans overall. 15.5% of all Silicon Valley startups by 2006 were founded by Indian immigrants, and Indian migrants have founded more engineering and technology companies from 1995 to 2005 than immigrants from the UK, China, Taiwan and Japan combined. Over 80% of all H-1B visas are granted to Indian IT professionals and 23% of all Indian business school graduates in USA take up a job in United States.

==== Caste and social discrimination ====
Caste identities and caste-based social divisions have also persisted among parts of the Indian diaspora. Research has documented caste-based discrimination and social divisions among Indian and South Asian communities in countries including the United States, the United Kingdom and Australia, although the extent and visibility of such practices vary between communities.

In the United States, scholars have examined caste discrimination in employment and other community settings. California Department of Fair Employment and Housing filed a lawsuit against Cisco Systems in 2020, alleging discrimination against a Dalit engineer by higher-caste supervisors, brought the issue to wider public attention.

In the United Kingdom, caste discrimination has been the subject of research, campaigning and debate over whether specific legal protections are necessary. Research and individual cases have documented allegations of discrimination in social, educational and employment settings, while some Hindu and Indian community organisations have disputed the extent of the problem and opposed caste-specific legislation.

== See also ==
- Overseas Citizenship of India
- Politicians of Indian descent
- Heads of state and government of Indian origin
- Overseas Indian representation in Indian sports
- Immigration to India
- Indian nationality law
- Indianisation
- Greater India
- Indosphere
- Anti-Indian sentiment
- Proto-Indo-Europeans
- Indo-Aryan peoples
- Dravidian peoples
- South Asian diaspora
- Romani people
- Romani diaspora
