= Africa–India relations =

- AU: India

Africa

India

Africa–India relations (also referred to as Indo-African relations or Afro-Indian relations) are the historical, political, economic, and cultural connections between India and the African continent.

Historical relations concerned mainly India and East Africa. However, in modern days—and with the expansion of diplomatic and commercial representations—India has now developed ties with most of the African nations. Trade between India and Africa stood at US$62.66 billion (2017–18) making India the fourth largest trading partner of Africa.

== Historical background ==
Africa and India are connected by the Indian Ocean. The geographical proximity between the Horn of Africa and the Indian subcontinent has played an important role in the development of the relationship since ancient times.

=== Ancient trade relations ===
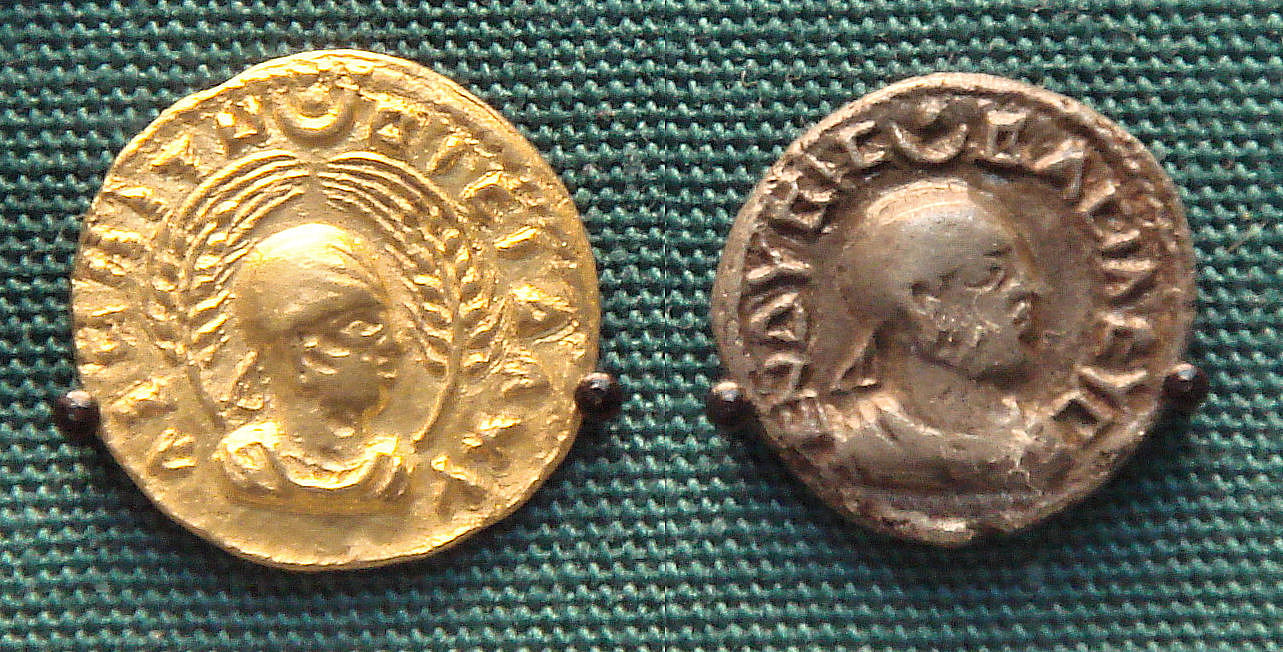
Coins of king Endybis, 227–235 AD, with Greek inscriptions. The left one reads ΑΞΩΜΙΤΩ ΒΑϹΙΛΕΥϹ, "King of Axum", and the right one ΕΝΔΥΒΙϹ ΒΑϹΙΛΕΥϹ, "King Endybis".

Indo-African relations date back to the Bronze Age period of the Indus Valley Civilization, Pearl millet first domesticated in Africa have been discovered from the site of Chanhu Daro and there is at least one burial of African women from the same site as well, it is thus postulated that Indus Valley maritime activities included journey to the horn of Africa and bringing back African crops along with African diaspora to the Indus valley since Pearl millet was cultivated in South Asia since 2nd millennium BC but there is no such evidence from the Near East. Black peppercorns were found stuffed in the nostrils of Ramesses II, placed there as part of the mummification rituals shortly after his death in 1213 BCE. In the 2nd century BC the Greek's accounts of Ptolemaic Egypt and its trade relations mention Indian ships making the trip and Greeks began to utilize this knowledge from Indian sailors to conduct maritime activities in the Indian Ocean and conduct business with the Indians directly instead of relying on the middle men, when Romans replaced the Greek administration in Egypt, this began a 400-year period of trade relations between the Roman Empire and India. Periplus Maris Erythraei (Periplus of the Erythraean Sea),—which dates to mid-first century—refers to trade relations between the Kingdom of Aksum and ancient India around the first millennium. Helped by the monsoon winds, merchants traded cotton, glass beads and other goods in exchange for gold and soft-carved ivory. The influence of the Indian architecture on the African kingdom shows the level of trade development between the two civilizations.

Under Ptolemaic rule, Ancient Egypt dispatched two trade delegations to India. The Greek Ptolemaic dynasty and India had developed bilateral trade using the Red Sea and Indian ports. Controlling the western and northern end of other trade routes to Southern Arabia and India, the Ptolemies had begun to exploit trading opportunities with India prior to the Roman involvement but according to the historian Strabo the volume of commerce between India and Greece was not comparable to that of later Indian-Roman trade. The Periplus Maris Erythraei mentions a time when sea trade between India and Egypt did not involve direct sailings. The cargo under these situations was shipped to Aden:

Eudaimon Arabia was called fortunate, being once a city, when, because ships neither came from India to Egypt nor did those from Egypt dare to go further but only came as far as this place, it received the cargoes from both, just as Alexandria receives goods brought from outside and from Egypt.

The trade started by Eudoxus of Cyzicus in 130 BCE kept increasing, and according to Strabo (II.5.12.):

"At any rate, when Gallus was prefect of Egypt, I accompanied him and ascended the Nile as far as Syene and the frontiers of Kingdom of Aksum, and I learned that as many as one hundred and twenty vessels were sailing from Myos Hormos to India, whereas formerly, under the Ptolemies, only a very few ventured to undertake the voyage and to carry on traffic in Indian merchandise."

In India, the ports of Barbaricum (modern Karachi), Barygaza, Muziris, Korkai, Kaveripattinam and Arikamedu on the southern tip of India were the main centers of this trade. The Periplus Maris Erythraei describes Greco-Roman merchants selling in Barbaricum "thin clothing, figured linens, topaz, coral, storax, frankincense, vessels of glass, and silver and gold plate" in exchange for "costus, bdellium, lycium, nard, turquoise, lapis lazuli, Seric skins, cotton cloth, silk yarn, and indigo". In Barygaza, they would buy wheat, rice, sesame oil, cotton and cloth.

With the establishment of Roman Egypt, the Romans took over and further developed the already existing trade. Roman trade with India played an important role in further developing the Red Sea route. Starting around 100 BCE a route from Roman Egypt to India was established, making use of the Red Sea to cross the Arabian Sea directly to southern India. Traces of Indian influences are visible in Roman works of silver and ivory, or in Egyptian cotton and silk fabrics. The Indian presence in Alexandria may have influenced the culture but little is known about the manner of this influence. Clement of Alexandria mentions the Buddha in his writings and other Indian religions find mentions in other texts of the period.

Blanche D'Souza states that Hindus had, by 1st millennium AD, begun using monsoon-led trade winds to establish trading activities between western parts of India and Mozambique, linking these to other eastern coastal regions of Africa and Arabian peninsula.

=== Medieval period relations ===
Relations attained stronger levels during medieval times due to the development of trade routes between the Mediterranean and Asia, through Arabia (see also: Indo-Mediterranean). The Islamic conquest of Indian subcontinent also further deepened relations with Islamic states in North Africa. Zheng He, a Chinese admiral met with the Malindi envoy present in Bengal. The Malindi traders had brought tribute of Giraffe for the Bengal sultan, so they gave one to the Chinese as well. Indian Hindu traders were reportedly present according to the records of Vasco da Gama in the south eastern African coast of Mozambique.

==== African heritage in India ====
Aside from the aforementioned Aksumite trade with India, the documented presence of Africans in India dates back to the eighth century CE. These was due to slave trade in the Indian Ocean, where non-Muslim enslaved Africans, who were sold to India to mainly to serve as eunuch bodyguards of high-ranking Muslim officials & their harems (quarters for Muslim concubines & enslaved Hindu women) & zenanas were freed from slavery by their owners and appointed in high offices after converting to Islam. Several Africans played an important role in different Indian dynasties. The first Habshi, of whom there is a historical record, was probably Jamal al-Din Yaqut, royal courtier in the Sultanate of Delhi, in the north of the sub-continent. Habshis were also reported in the interior of northern India. Ibn Battuta recalls that at Alapur, the Governor was the Abyssinian Badr. A man whose bravery passed into a proverb. Some of the Africans who rose to positions of considerable importance were: Malik Ambar, Malik Sarwar, Mubarak Shah, Ibrahim Shah, Malik Andil, Malik Sandal, Yaqut Dabuli Habshi, Ikhlas Khan, Dilawar Khan, Khavass Khan etc. Many formerly enslaved African Muslims also rose up the ranks to become Sultans in areas like Bengal, Jaunpur, and Malwa. Their role in the History of India is Significant. The Africans, who arrived in Hyderabad apart from playing their traditional role as bonded guards and servants, were recruited as the Nizam's private bodyguard. The Siddi Risala (African Regiment) was retained until 1948. Other Siddis were elevated to the status of Khanazahs (proteges) and became trusted advisers of the Nizams.

=== Under the rule of the British Empire ===
During the British colonial rule in the Indian subcontinent and large parts of Africa, the Indian city of Mumbai was already a center of ivory trade between East Africa and Britain.

The stay of Mahatma Gandhi in South Africa between 1893 and 1915 remains one of the main events which paved the road to the modern-day political relations.

== Modern-day relations ==
=== Political ===
The development of modern-day relations has gone through two main periods. During the period of colonialism and liberation wars, political relations became stronger. At the wake of the Cold War, many African countries joined the non-aligned movement pioneered by Egypt, Ghana, India, Indonesia and Yugoslavia.

During the years of decolonisation, India exerted considerable political and ideological influence in Africa as a role model and a leader of the Non-Aligned Movement. But India's ability to develop a broader strategic role in Africa during the 20th century was subject to several constraints. India's influence was limited by financial weakness and inward-looking economic policies. Its commitment to decolonisation through nonviolent means made it relatively reluctant to provide military assistance to national liberation movements. India's role in East Africa was also constrained by the large Indian ethnic population that was often resented by black African nationalists. The most famous case of Indophobia is the ethnic cleansing of Indians and other South Asians in Uganda by Idi Amin.

The India-Africa Forum Summit, which was held from April 4 to April 8, 2008 in New Delhi, India for the first time, constitutes the basic framework for the relations under the South-South Cooperation platform.

In July 2019, Finance Minister Nirmala Sitharaman announced that India would open embassies in 18 African countries. This would result in Indian embassies being located in 47 of 54 African countries. Five new embassies were opened in Rwanda, Djibouti, Equatorial Guinea, Republic of Guinea and Burkina Faso in 2018-19, and eight new embassies were opened in Cameroon, Republic of the Congo, Eritrea, Eswatini, Sierra Leone, São Tomé and Príncipe, Togo and Liberia in 2019-20. The other 5 new embassies will be opened in Cape Verde, Chad, Guinea Bissau, Mauritania, and Somalia.

There are numerous of Indians and Africans of Indian descent living in Africa, mainly in the eastern and southern coast in places such as Mauritius, Kenya and South Africa.

There are at least 40,000 Africans in India.

=== Business ===
Trade between India and Africa has grown exponentially during the past 15 years. Indo-African trade volume reached US$53.3 billion in 2010-11 & US$62 billion in 2011–12. It is US$90 billion by 2015. Moreover, Indian firms are conducting numerous takeovers abroad and are venturing into Africa, such as in June 2008, Bharti Airtel, an Indian telecommunications giant, purchased Zain Africa for US$9 billion.

As of 2015, India has emerged as Africa's fourth largest trade partner behind China, EU & USA whilst Africa has emerged as India's sixth largest trading partner behind EU, China, UAE, USA & ASEAN. This volume was at a meager US$3 billion in 2001. In November 2012 FICCI President led a business delegation to Ethiopia to meet the new Prime Minister Hailemariam Desalegn and reaffirm India's commitment to the growth and development of Africa.

Indian companies have already invested more than US$34 billion in the resource-rich continent as of 2011 & further investments worth US$59.7 billion are in the pipeline. Among the proposals that CII (Confederation of Indian Industry) received from the African nations are 126 agricultural projects worth an investment of $4.74 billion, 177 infrastructure projects worth $34.19 billion, and 34 energy sector plans costing $20.74 billion (337 projects totalling US$59.7 billion). Ex-Prime Minister of India, Dr.Manmohan Singh while expressing his country's support to Africa, said in an Indo-African trade summit that "Africa possesses all the prerequisites to become a major growth pole of the world in the 21st century. We will work with Africa to enable it to realise this potential". The Indian government has promised to extend loans worth US$5.4 billion (during 2011–14) to several African nations in order to nurture growth in those nations. According to Rejaul Karim Laskar, a scholar of India's foreign policy, "the African countries are presently at such a stage of development when India can offer the most appropriate technology at competitive prices".

=== India–Africa Forum Summit ===
The India–Africa Forum Summit (IAFS) is the official platform for African-Indian relations. The IAFS is held once in every three years. It was first held from April 4 to April 8, 2008 in New Delhi, and was the first such meeting between the heads of state and government of India and 14 countries of Africa chosen by the African Union.

=== Indian foreign aid to Africa ===
In 2006, India launched its flagship aid initiative in Africa by constructing the $125 million Pan-African e-Network, the continent's largest tele-education and telemedicine initiative. The network links 47 African countries with schools and hospitals in India through satellite and fiber-optic links.

At the second India–Africa Forum Summit in Addis Ababa, Ethiopia in 2011, then Indian Prime Minister Manmohan Singh expressed India's desire to help African nations with their development needs. Singh announced that India would invest $700 million to establish educational institutions and training programs in several African countries, including Uganda, Ghana, Botswana and Burundi. The Prime Minister also announced $5 billion in lines of credit for African nations. India made further commitments to Africa at the third India-Africa Forum Summit in 2014.

India allocated $43 million or 7% of its technical cooperation budget to African countries in 2012–13, a 4% increase over the previous fiscal. India budgeted $63 million in aid to African countries in 2014–15, less than 5% of its total foreign aid budget and slightly higher than the previous fiscal.

== Cultural relations ==
=== Africa-lndia Cultural Diplomacy ===
Indian cinema has played a significant role in Africa, connecting communities with Indian culture through films that offer insights into social values, fashion, and cuisine, which has become an important aspect of the soft power of India in Africa.

The Indian diaspora in Africa, spanning 46 countries and representing a significant portion of India's total diaspora, plays a crucial role in enhancing bilateral relations and shaping Africa-India cultural connections through substantial investments and involvement in cultural programs and sectors of governance.

India's cultural diplomacy is also reflected in its spread of Yoga and Ayush practices, with initiatives like the International Day of Yoga strengthening cultural ties and enhancing bilateral relations, exemplifying the soft power of India in Africa.

=== Sports ===
British colonisation gave India and Africa new sporting ties, such as through cricket. The colonial era also saw the Indian sport kho kho come to South Africa.

== India's foreign relations with African countries ==
- Algeria–India relations
- Angola–India relations
- Benin–India relations
- Botswana–India relations
- Burkina Faso–India relations
- Burundi–India relations
- Cameroon–India relations
- Cape Verde–India relations
- Central African Republic–India relations
- Chad–India relations
- Comoros–India relations
- Democratic Republic of the Congo–India relations
- Republic of the Congo–India relations
- Djibouti–India relations
- Egypt–India relations
- Equatorial Guinea–India relations
- Eritrea–India relations
- Eswatini–India relations
- Ethiopia–India relations
- Gabon–India relations
- (The Gambia) Gambia–India relations
- Ghana–India relations
- Guinea–India relations
- Guinea-Bissau–India relations
- India–Ivory Coast relations
- India–Kenya relations
- India–Lesotho relations
- India–Liberia relations
- India–Libya relations
- India–Madagascar relations
- India–Malawi relations
- India–Mali relations
- India–Mauritania relations
- India–Mauritius relations
- India–Morocco relations
- India–Mozambique relations
- India–Namibia relations
- India–Niger relations
- India–Nigeria relations
- India–Rwanda relations
- India–São Tomé and Príncipe relations
- India–Senegal relations
- India–Seychelles relations
- India–Sierra Leone relations
- India–Somalia relations
- India–South Africa relations
- India–South Sudan relations
- India–Sudan relations
- India–Tanzania relations
- India–Togo relations
- India–Tunisia relations
- India–Uganda relations
- India–Zambia relations
- India–Zimbabwe relations

== See also ==
- Africa–United States relations
- Africa–Soviet Union relations
- Africa–European Union relations
- Africa–France relations
- Afro-Asia
  - Africa–China relations
  - Africa–Taiwan relations
  - Africa–Japan relations
  - Africa–South Korea relations
  - Africa–North Korea relations
- Foreign relations of India
- Siddi
- Indian diaspora in Southeast Africa
