= Indo-African =

African-Indian, usually refers to people of mixed Indian and African heritage.

- By demographic
  - Dougla, Caribbean people who are of mixed African and Indian descent
  - Chagossians, people of African, Malagasy and Indian ancestry who formerly lived in the Chagos Islands
- Members of the Indian diaspora living in Africa and citizens of India living in Africa:
  - Indian South Africans (Natal Indians and Tamil South Africans)
  - Indian diaspora in Southeast Africa
  - Indians in Botswana
  - Indians in Madagascar (Madagascan Muslims)
  - Indians in Kenya
  - Indians in Mozambique
  - Indians in Réunion (Malbars and Zarabes)
  - Indians in Tanzania
  - Indians in Uganda
  - Indians in Zambia
  - Indians in Zimbabwe
  - Mauritians of Indian origin (Bihari and Tamil Mauritians)
  - Indo-Seychellois (Tamil Seychellois)
  - Indians in Malawi
  - Indians in Lesotho
  - Indians in Libya
  - Indians in Gabon
  - Indians in the Gambia
  - Indians in Ghana
  - Indians in Ethiopia
  - Indians in Eswatini
  - Indians in Eritrea
  - Indians in Egypt
  - Indians in Algeria
  - Indians in Angola
  - Indians in Burkina Faso
  - Indians in Burundi
  - Indians in Cameroon
  - Indians in Chad
  - Indians in Comoros
  - Indians in the Congo
  - Indians in the DR Congo
  - Indians in Equatorial Guinea
  - Indians in Guinea
  - Indians in Ivory Coast
  - Indians in Mauritania
  - Indians in Niger
  - Indians in Nigeria
  - Indians in Rwanda
  - Indians in Senegal
  - Indians in Sierra Leone
  - Indians in Somalia
  - Indians in South Sudan
  - Indians in Sudan
  - Indians in Tunisia
- Members of the African diaspora living in India:
  - Siddis, a South Asian community of Bantu descent, with the Siddi Community in Karnataka being the most well-known.
  - Afro-Asians in South Asia, South Asian people of African descent whose ancestors came for work, study or business. Every year hundreds of African citizens come to India for short-term residence purposes.

Occasionally, the term "African Indian" may refer to people of mixed African and Indigenous American heritage, such as Zambo people or Black Native Americans in the United States, as "Indian" is also colloquially used to refer to native American peoples.

== See also ==
- Afro-Asiatic (disambiguation)
- Siddi (disambiguation)
- Afro-Asians
- Indo-Caribbean people
