= Somalis in India =

- (Somalia) (India)
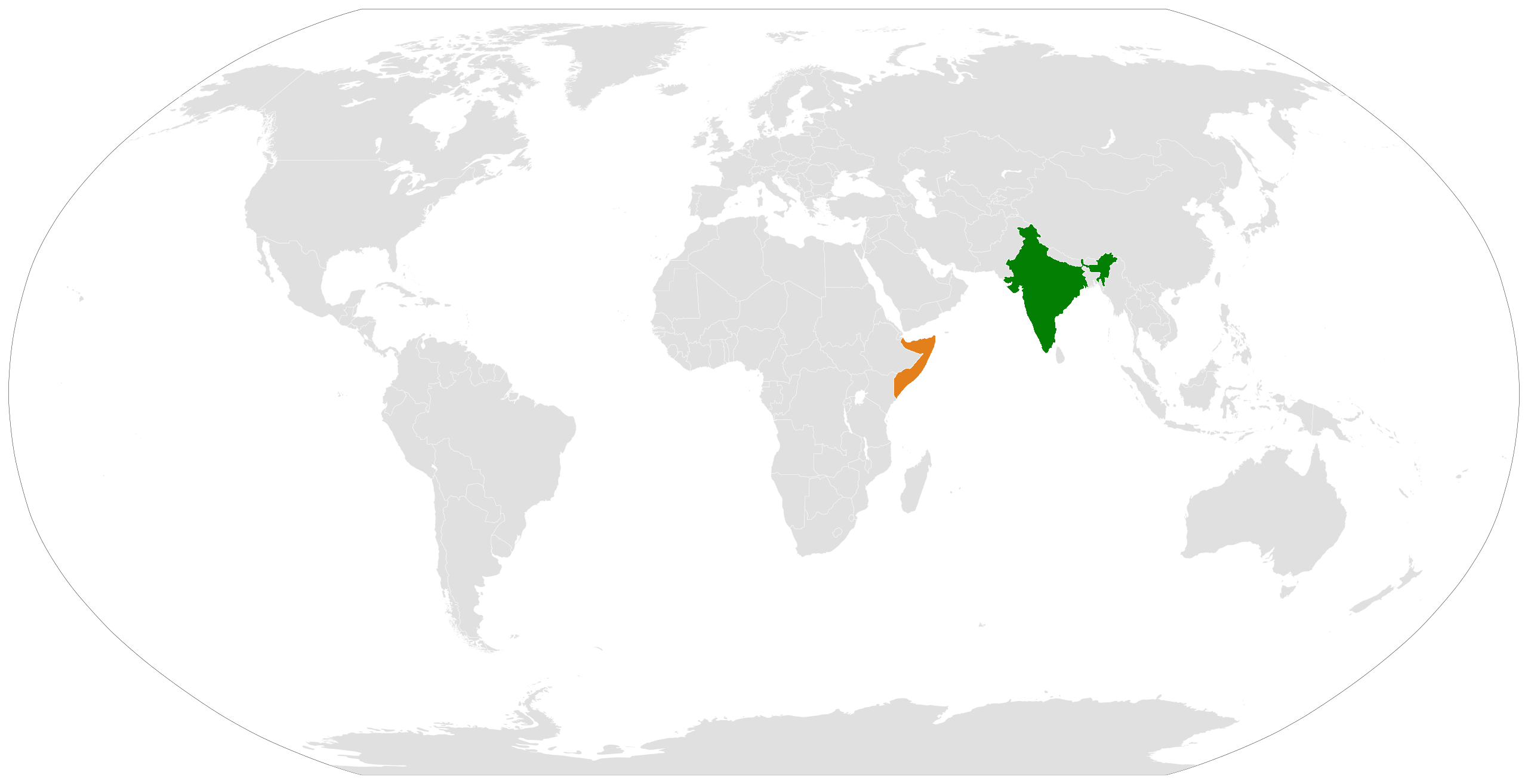

Total population
- 5000

Regions with significant populations
- Pune; New Delhi; Mumbai; Hyderabad; Mysore; Aurangabad; Kochi; Jaipur; Ahmedabad; Indore; Lucknow; Kolkata

Languages
- Somali; Arabic

Religion
- Islam

Somalis in India include naturalized citizens and residents of India who were born in or have ancestors from Somalia.

Somalis have a long history of maritime trade and interaction with the peoples of India as well as Pakistan, Bangladesh and Nepal, having established various commercial settlements, trade stations and partnerships with the Malacca Sultanate and the Kingdom of Cambaya, among other ancient Indian polities.

After the outbreak of the Somali Civil War in 1991, some Somalis sought asylum in India. This small community of an estimated 600 people today comprises the bulk of Somali immigrants in the country.

== History ==
The Somali people have a strong tradition in trade, with a long history of maritime enterprise. After the Roman conquest of the Nabataean Empire and the Roman naval presence at Aden to curb piracy, Arab and Somali merchants by agreement barred Somali ships from trading in the free port cities of the Arabian Peninsula to protect the interests of Somali and Arab merchants in the extremely lucrative ancient Red Sea–Mediterranean Sea commerce. However, Indian merchants continued to trade in the port cities of the Somali peninsula, which was free from Roman interference.

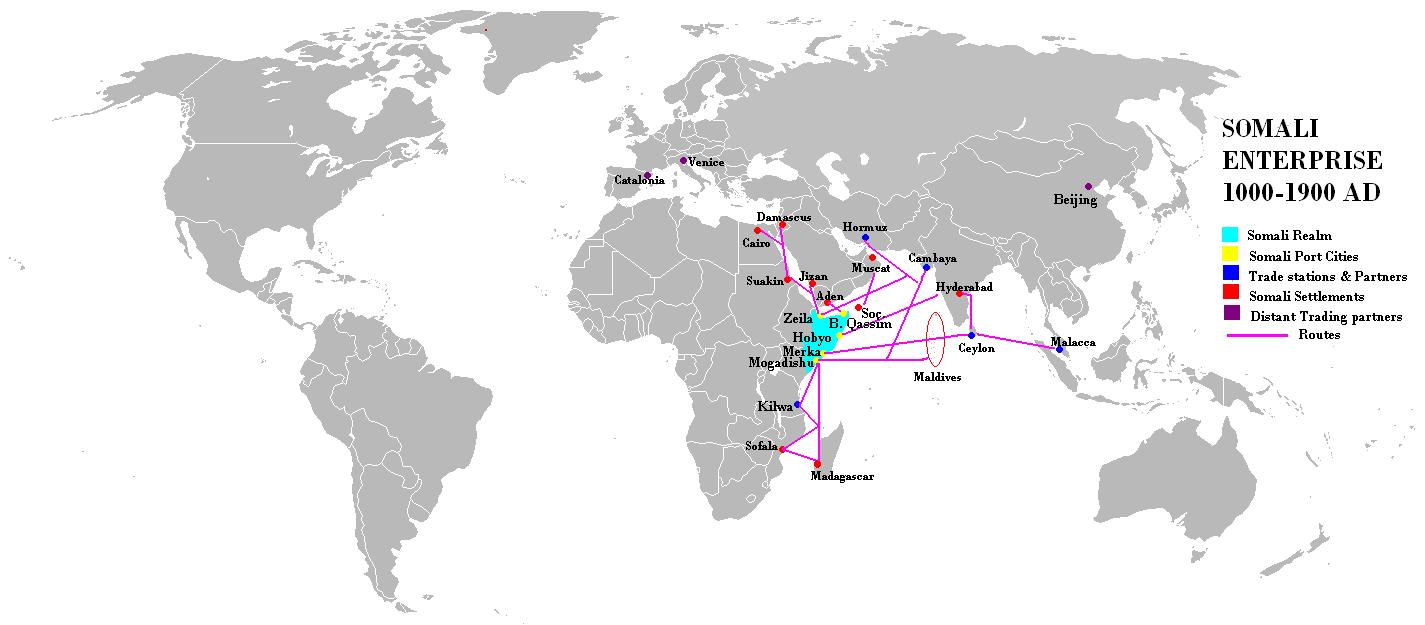
The history of Somali maritime trade and interaction with ancient Indian empires stretches back to antiquity.

The Indian merchants for centuries brought large quantities of cinnamon from Sri Lanka and Indonesia to Somalia and Arabia. This is said to have been the best kept secret of the Arab and Somali merchants in their trade with the Roman and Greek world. The Romans and Greeks believed the source of cinnamon to have been the Somali peninsula, but in reality, the highly valued product was brought to Somalia by way of Indian ships. Through collusive agreement by Somali and Arab traders, Indian/Chinese cinnamon was also exported for far higher prices to North Africa, the Near East and Europe, which made the cinnamon trade a very profitable revenue generator, especially for the Somali merchants through whose hands large quantities were shipped across ancient sea and land routes.

During the Age of the Ajurans, the Somali sultanates and republics of Merca, Mogadishu, Barawa, Hobyo and their respective ports flourished and had a lucrative foreign commerce, with ships sailing to and coming from India, Arabia, Venetia, Persia, Egypt, Portugal and as far away as China. In the 16th century, Duarte Barbosa noted that many ships from the Kingdom of Cambaya in modern-day India sailed to Mogadishu with cloth and spices, for which they in return received gold, wax and ivory. Barbosa highlighted the abundance of meat, wheat, barley, horses and fruit on the coastal markets, which generated enormous wealth for the merchants. Jewish merchants from the Hormuz also brought their Indian textile and fruit to the Somali coast in exchange for grain and wood.

In addition, trading relations were established with the Indian Malacca Sultanate in the 15th century, with cloth, ambergris and porcelain being the main commodities of the trade. Hindu merchants from Surat, seeking to bypass both the Portuguese blockade and Omani meddling, also used the Somali ports of Merca and Barawa (which were out of their jurisdiction) to conduct their trade in safety and without interference.

And also famous somali politician Haji Farah Omar visited India in 1930, where he met Mahatma Gandhi and was influenced by Gandhi's non-violent philosophy, which he adopted in his campaign in British Somaliland Protectorate.

More recently, a few Somalis have sought asylum in India as a consequence of the Somali Civil War, which broke out in 1991. This small community of expatriates today comprises the bulk of Somali immigrants in the country.

== Distribution ==
Somalis mainly live in the following cities: Pune, New Delhi, Mumbai, Hyderabad, Mysore and Aurangabad.

There are an estimated 600 Somali refugees in India, 80 to 90 percent of whom are concentrated in the city of Hyderabad as opposed to New Delhi.

== Social issues ==
Somali asylum seekers in India often face greater challenges than do other immigrant groups in terms of gaining access to medical treatment and education, as well as locating suitable housing accommodations. This is primarily due to a lack of familiarity with both Hindi and English, which makes it difficult to find adequate jobs. As many are also not issued resident permits by the government, employers are often reluctant to hire the foreigners for fear of attracting the attention of the local police.

Most of the Somali expatriates are young adults and unaccompanied minors who live in shared accommodation with little access to institutional support, as most of the services that they require are located in New Delhi.

Despite this, some of the immigrants have reported better living conditions in Hyderabad on account of the lower overall cost of living, particularly in terms of housing and food. Hyderabad's large Muslim population and culture has also made for an easier transition.

== See also ==
- India–Somalia relations
- Somali diaspora
- Somali people
- UNHCR India
