= Djibouti–India relations =

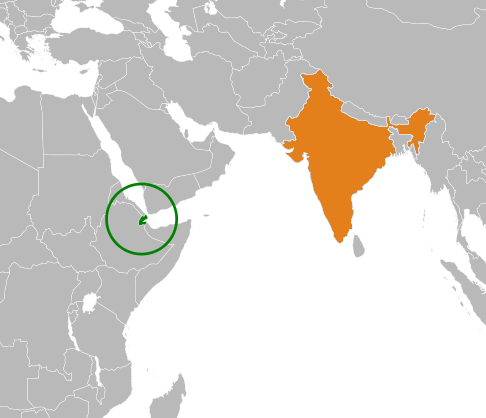
- Djibouti: India

Djibouti–India relations are bilateral relations between Djibouti and India. Djibouti has an embassy in New Delhi and a Consulate-General in Mumbai. India has an embassy in Djibouti City.

== History ==
Contacts between India and Djibouti have existed since ancient times. The port of Adulis was the hub of maritime trade where Indian seafarers traded spices and silk for gold and ivory. Djiboutian traders traded in hides and skins for Indian perfumes and spices.

== Development cooperation ==
President of Djibouti Ismaïl Omar Guelleh made visit to India in May 2003. India has extended a line of credits to set up a 600 TPD cement plant at Ali Sabieh. The Indian community in Djibouti is around 600 people, the oldest Indian community is Gujarati traders.

== Agreements ==
On 31 January 1989, the governments of Djibouti and India signed a Cultural Cooperation Agreement. Djibouti also signed a Memorandum of Understanding with the Telecommunication Consultants of India for implementation of the Pan-African e-Network project on Tele-education and Telemedicine. Additionally, a Civil Aviation Agreement and Bilateral Investment Promotion and Protection Agreement (BIPPA)s was signed in New Delhi on 19 May 2003.

== See also ==
- Africa–India relations
