= India–Morocco relations =

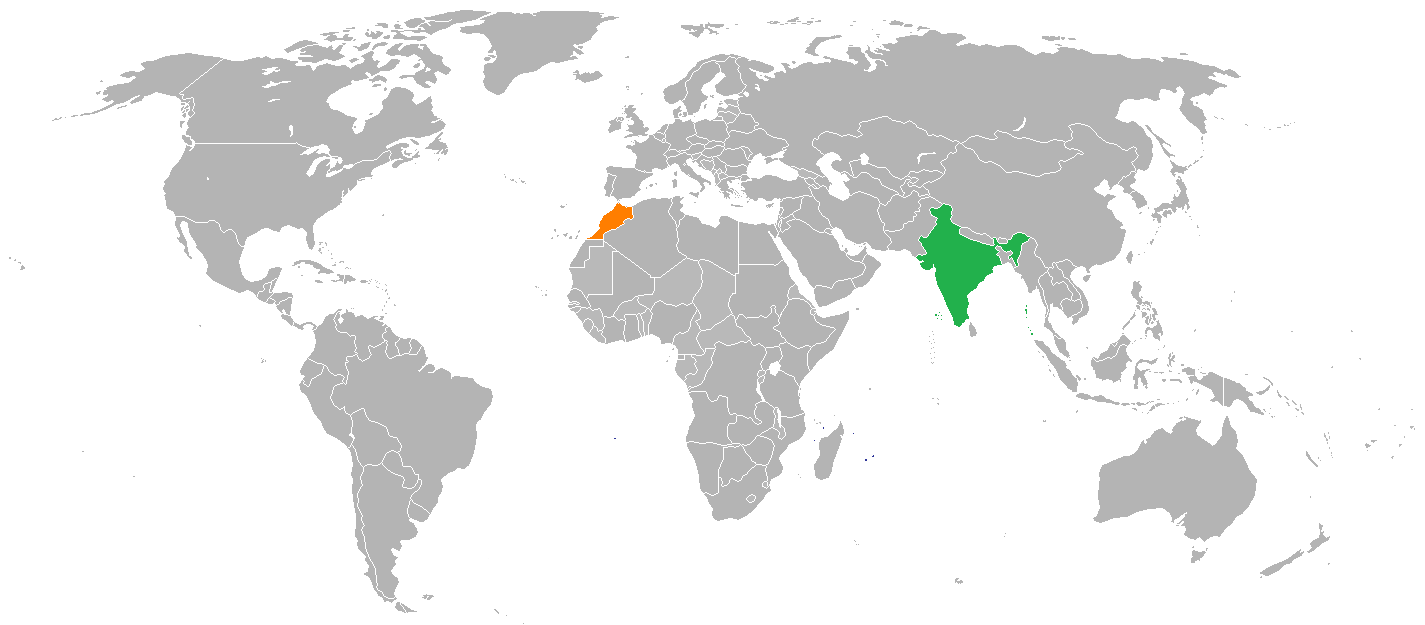
- India: Morocco

Diplomatic mission
- Embassy of India, Rabat, Morocco: Embassy of Morocco, New Delhi, India

Envoy
- Indian Ambassador to Morocco Rajesh Vaishnaw: Moroccan Ambassador to India Mohamed Maliki

India–Morocco relations are the bilateral ties between India and Morocco. Morocco has an embassy in New Delhi, and Consulates in Mumbai and Kolkata. India operates an embassy in Rabat. Both nations are part of the Non-Aligned Movement.

== Historical ==
Arab explorer Ibn Battuta from Tangier, Morocco visited Delhi in early 1300s where he was made judge by the Sultan of Delhi Muhammad bin Tughlaq.

In the United Nations, India supported the decolonisation of Morocco and the Moroccan freedom movement. India recognised Morocco on June 20, 1956 and established relations in 1957. The Ministry of External Affairs of the Government of India states that "India and Morocco have enjoyed cordial and friendly relations and over the years bilateral relations have witnessed significant depth and growth." In January 2017, India wholeheartedly welcomed Morocco’s return to African Union, which has strengthened Africa’s Unity.

== Exchanges and Trade relations ==
India was Morocco's 4th largest trading partner 13th largest supplier in the first half of 2021. India is one of the major markets for Moroccan phosphate and its derivatives.

A high-level Moroccan trade delegation led by Ambassador Mohamed Maliki visited India on a six-day visit in November 2021. Maliki declared that the country had a national plan to increase their presence in India. He also announced that the country would open a consulate in Bangalore.

The Indian Council for Cultural Relations promotes Indian culture in Morocco. Morocco seeks to increase its trade ties with India and is seeking Indian investment in various sectors

King Mohammed VI of Morocco sent a congratulatory message to Narendra Modi on the occasion of his inauguration as Prime Minister of the Republic of India for a third term.

== Diplomatic missions ==
=== Indian Embassy ===
The Indian embassy is located in Rabat.

- Ambassador Shri Rajesh Vaishnaw

=== Moroccan Embassy ===
The Moroccan embassy is located in New Delhi.

- Ambassador Mohamed Maliki

== Defence ==
On July 8, 2019, INS Tarkash visited Tangier for a three day visit. On departing the port, INS Tarkash will carry out a Passage Exercise at sea with ships of the Royal Moroccan Navy.

On September 25, 2023 INS Sumedha and RMNS L C Errahmani (501) conducted a Maritime Partnership Exercise (MPX) near Casablanca Port.

On July 8, 2024, INS Tabar visited Casablanca for a three day visit. Later, upon departure from Casablanca, the two Navies will also undertake a PASSEX at sea.

On December 27, 2024, INS Tushil arrived at Casablanca. Both the navies will engage in a Passage Exercise (PASSEX) at sea to improve interoperability and share the best practices.

On April 15, 2026, INS Sudarshini made port call at Casablanca as part of its ongoing transoceanic deployment under Lokayan 26 and MAHASAGAR (Mutual and Holistic Advancement for Security and Growth Across the Region).

On April 16, 2026, Commanding Officer of INS Sudarshini called on Cmde Hassan Akouli, Commander of the Central Maritime Sector, Royal Moroccan Navy, and Cmde Omar Nasri, Director of the Royal Naval School, Morocco.

== See also ==
- Ibn Battuta, Muslim jurist and traveler from Morocco who served as a qazi in the Delhi Sultanate and as its ambassador to China.
- Nora Fatehi, Indian actress of Moroccan origin.
