= India–Mozambique relations =

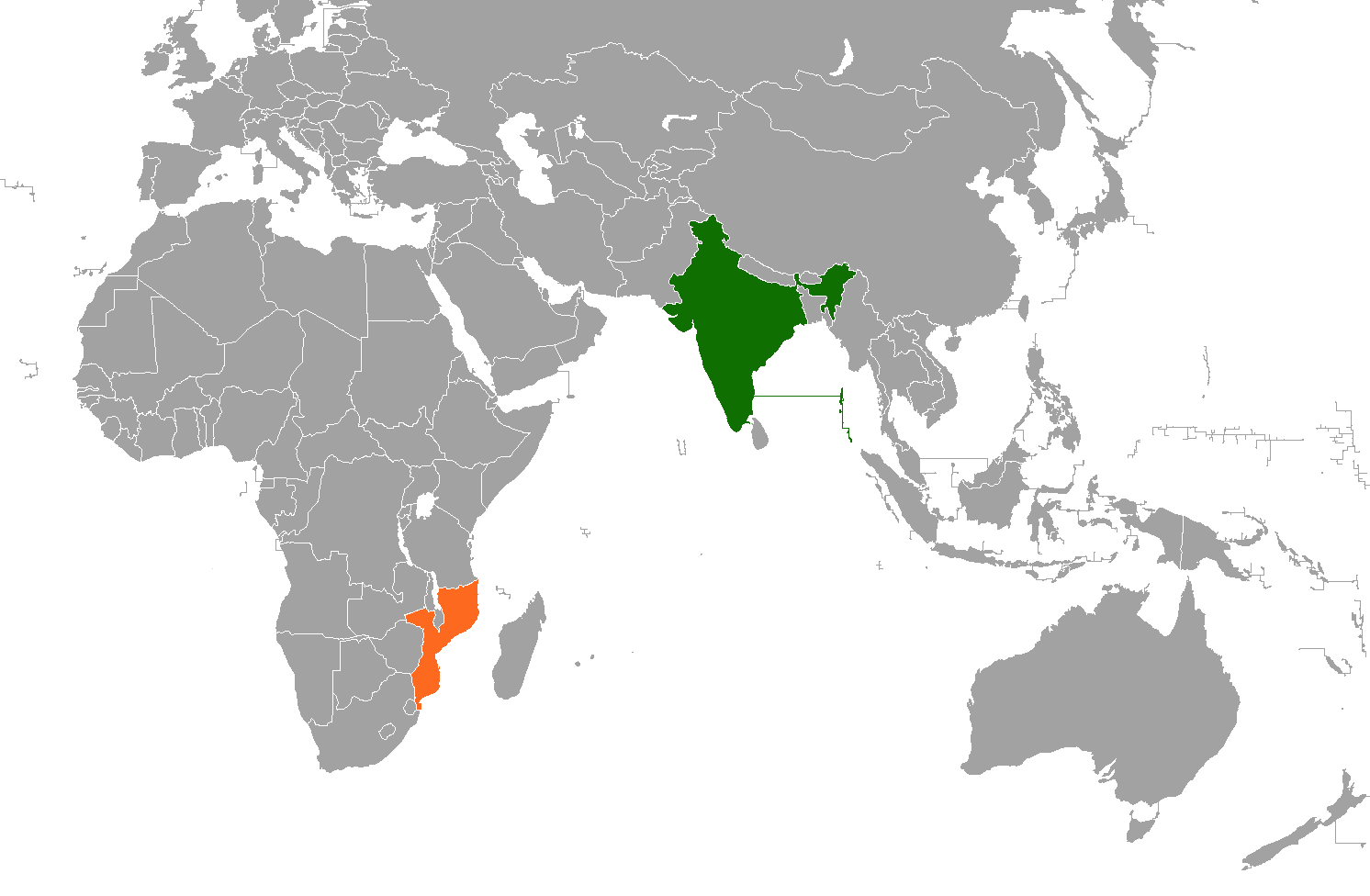
- India: Mozambique

India–Mozambique relations are the bilateral relations between India and Mozambique. India has a high commissioner in Maputo and Mozambique has a high commissioner in New Delhi.

== History ==
Arabic geographer Al-Idrisi (12th century) noted Indian settlements at Sofala and describes that settlements incorporated several towns, including Sayuna, which was;

medium in size and its inhabitants are a collection of people from Hind [India], Zunuj [Mogadishu according to Trimingham] and others….

— Al-Idrisi

The Indian state of Goa and Mozambique as a whole were both former Portuguese colonies.

== Economy ==
Mumbai-based Videocon Industries is part of a consortium of companies exploring for hydrocarbons off the coast of Mozambique's northern Cabo Delgado Province. Videocon intends to import and sell Mozambican natural gas in India. India's coal companies are also closely involved with coal production in Mozambique.

A Memorandum of Understanding regarding cooperation in the area of renewable energy was signed during Mozambique President Filipe Jacinto Nyusi's visit to India on 5 August 2015.

== Military cooperation ==
In September 1986, India was asked to provide technical assistance and security forces to protect the Beira Corridor. Zimbabwe President Robert Mugabe asked for the deployment of a squadron of Indian Air Force Mig-21 aircraft with Indian pilots to provide air cover for the corridor: half the aircraft were to be based in Harare and half in Chimoio, Mozambique. But Rajiv Gandhi decided that deployment of the Indian Air Force to Mozambique was too much of a reversal of India's public stance against the overseas deployment of Indian forces or carried too much risk for India. New Delhi may have decided instead to secretly provide assistance to the Mozambique through providing what has been called 'a small naval presence' in Mozambique waters.

The two states also work closely on issues of security, especially maritime safety in the Indian Ocean; in June 2011, government ministers met and agreed to work together on the issue. In 2010, the Indian Navy rescued a Mozambican vessel from pirates. In 2012, the Indian Navy agreed to commence antipiracy patrols in the Mozambique Channel, apparently without prior consultation with South Africa.

Indian Navy has berthing rights in Mozambique. When Cyclone Idai hit Mozambique, India diverted three ships of the Indian Navy to provide assistance. The ships INS Sujata, ICGS Sarathi and INS Shardul rescued 192 people and provided medical assistance to 1,381 people. Fourth ship INS Magar joined in by bringing relief materials. Helicopters from the ship made sorties conducting aerial survey helping the disaster management efforts and dropped food, water and medical supplies in cyclone hit areas.

== See also ==
- Indians in Mozambique
- High Commission of India, Maputo
