= India–Mali relations =

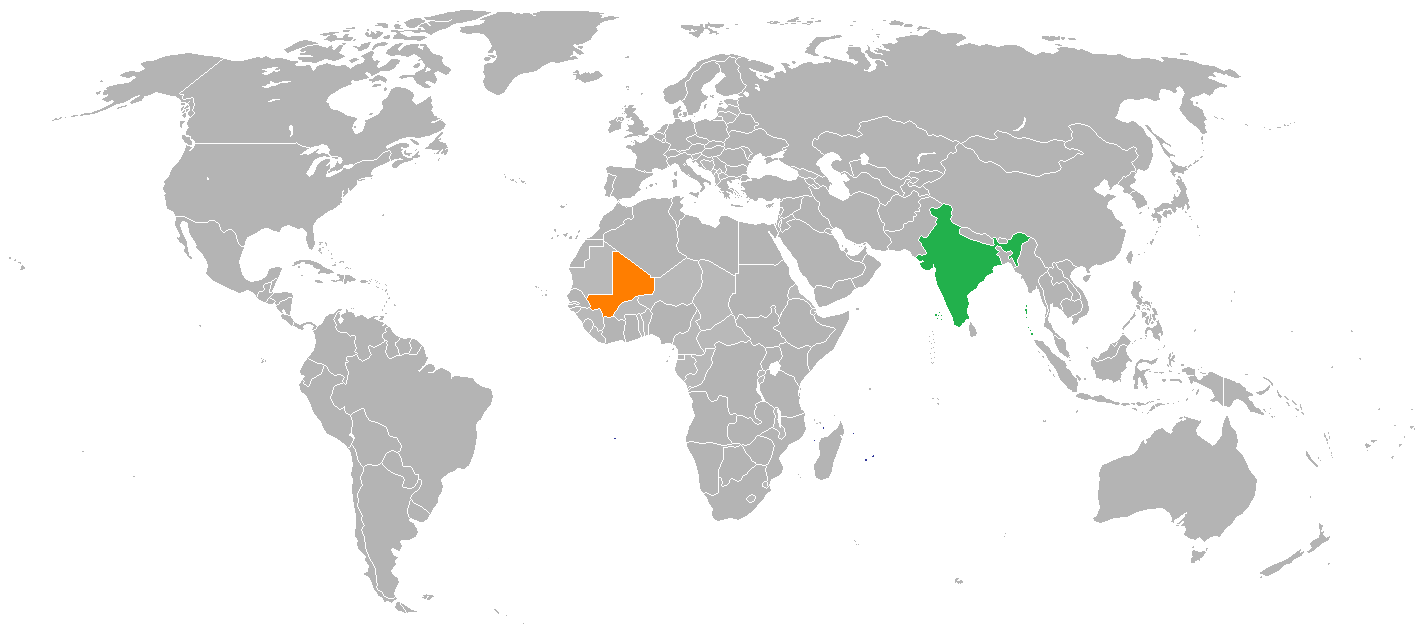
- India: Mali

India–Mali relations refers to the bilateral ties between the Republic of India and the Republic of Mali.

Both nations are part of the Non-Aligned Movement. Mali supports India's candidacy for a permanent seat in a reformed Security Council. India offered to set up a food processing business incubation centre in Mali under the IAFS-II. The President of Mali, Amadou Toumani Toure, paid an official visit to India from 11–12 January 2012. He led a high-powered ministerial and business delegation, which included his spouse, many ministers and other dignitaries. The President of India hosted a banquet in honour of the visiting dignitary on 11 January 2012. Earlier, delegation-level talks were held in Hyderabad House during which the entire gamut of bilateral relations was reviewed. The two sides agreed to deepen bilateral relations. President Toure and Prime Minister Manmohan Singh led their respective delegations during the talks. An MoU on cooperation in the Field of Geology and Mineral Resources, and an agreement for grant of a Government of India Line of Credit of US$100 million for a power transmission project in Mali, were signed in the presence of the two leaders.

India-Mali Trade Figures (In US $ Millions)
Year	India’s Exports	India’s Imports	Total Trade	Growth in %
2009-2010	42.24	3.86	46.10	
2010-2011	73.62	3.32	76.94	66.91
2011-2012	98.37	6.1	104.47	36.61
2012-2013	78.66	29.55	108.21	3.58
2013-2014	108.78	70.91	179.70	66.06
2014-2015	134.12	78.59	212.72	18.38
2015-2016	107.93	242.78	350.72	64.87
2016-2017	107.7	99.23	206.94	-41
2017-18	123.6	114.14	237.74	14.89
2018-19	130.69	18.31	148.99	-37.33

== See also ==
- Embassy of India, Bamako
