= Benin–India relations =

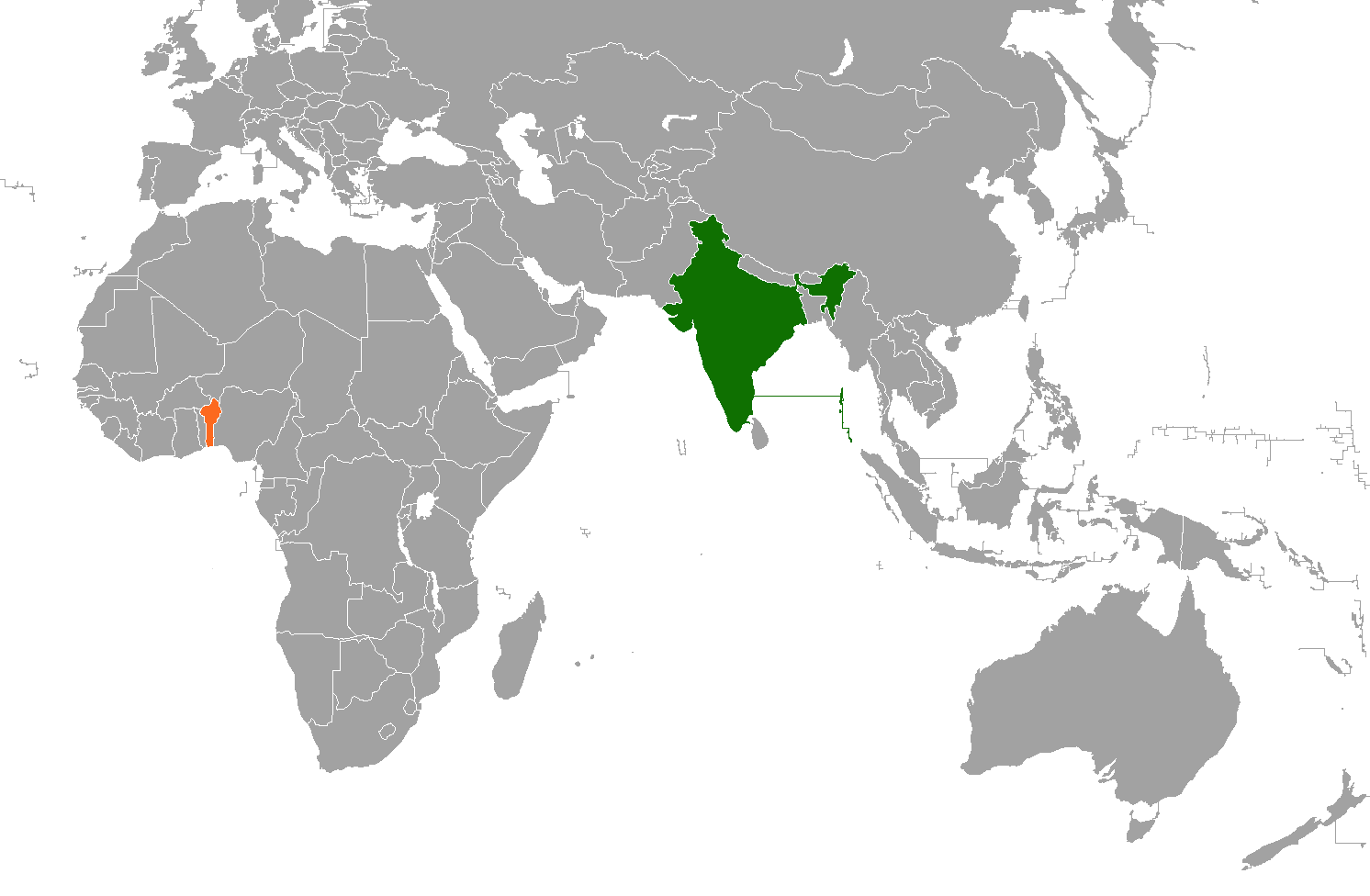
- India: Benin

Benin–India relations refers to the bilateral ties between India and Benin.

Both nations are part of the Non-Aligned Movement. Benin supports India's candidature for a permanent seat in a reformed Security Council. The Ministry of External Affairs of the Government of India has said that India's ties with Benin were characterized by "democracy" and "secularism".

The Indian Minister of State for External affairs visited Benin, where he said that,"We in India greatly admire Republic of Benin as a shining example of a tolerant, progressive multi-ethnic and multi-religious society with a multi-party democracy. India, being the world's largest democracy, rejoices at Benin's various achievements and wishes to contribute to its further success."

== Economic ties ==
Trade between India and Benin has been growing consistently and had reached nearly 310 million dollars by 2009. India is one of Benin's largest trading partners and is the third largest export market for Benin, with exports being primarily in agro-products such as cashew nuts and cotton. India recently launched a Duty Free Tariff Preferences regime to promote trade with Benin.

== Diplomatic representation ==
Benin does not have a resident embassy in New Delhi. India also does not have a resident mission in Benin. The Indian High Commissioner in Abuja is concurrently accredited to Benin.
