= India–Liberia relations =

- India: Liberia

India–Liberia relations refers to the bilateral relationship between India and the Liberia.

India is represented in Liberia through its embassy in Abidjan (Ivory Coast) and an active honorary consulate in Monrovia since 1984. Liberia was represented in India through its resident mission in New Delhi which subsequently closed due to budgetary constraints.

== Strategic cooperation ==
Bilateral relations have traditionally been strong and cordial with Liberia's full-fledged support for India's aspiration for permanent membership on the United Nations Security Council. In recent years, both nations have developed close and extensive cooperation in trade, military and strategic fields.

India sent the first all-women police unit of the UNMIL peacekeeping force to Liberia in 2007, with further batches arriving in the following years. The Indian government has taken a proactive role in creating new models of community and service-oriented policing in Liberia. In particular, India's CRPF has facilitated Liberian women's involvement in the National Police Service and law enforcement.

== Commercial and economic relations ==
There are more than fifty Indian companies operating in Liberia, from small trading firms to steel magnates. In 2006, the PIO firm ArcelorMittal was awarded the large LIMINCO iron ore mine against an investment of $930 million over a twenty-year period. Recently, the Liberian government, which in September 2008 had disqualified Tata Steel from the bidding process for the $1.6 billion-Western Cluster iron ore project, has cleared the Indian steel major for the upcoming auction. With intensive Indian lobbying, Tata Steel's bid has been rated very high and favorably on technical, financial and social terms by the international consultancy firm Deloitte & Touche, engaged by the Liberian government. Moreover, the expanding Taurian group is negotiating for iron ore, gold and chromite mining concessions. This reflects India's diplomatic strategy of focusing on raw material security, especially in the West African region.

Amidst India's growing role in Liberia, the Liberian Minister of Mines and Energy, Dr. Eugene Shannon visited India in October 2005 to participate in the Confederation of Indian Industry-Africa Conclave. In 2008, the President of Liberia Ellen Johnson Sirleaf was invited to visit India. Major items of Indian exports include engineering goods, pharmaceuticals, two wheelers, transportation equipment, steel and plastic products. Major items of imports are gold, diamonds, timber and metal scrap. Following lifting of UN sanctions, timber concessions have been awarded to Indian firms. Overall, Indian investments in Liberia have been increased from US$450 million in 2005 to an estimated $2 billion in 2009.

The Indian Ambassador Shamma Jain has stated that she is committed to building strategic partnerships at all levels of government and facilitating new strategies for bilateral cooperation. In this regard, Ambassador Jain is moving quickly to intensify India's relations with Liberia in the agricultural sector with the implementation of model agricultural projects with the help of scientists at the Indian Center of Agricultural Research (ICAR). In February 2009, Liberia's Agriculture Minister Dr. J. Chris Toe & Ambassador Jain discussed possible areas of support including emergency assistance to the Liberian agricultural sector amidst the caterpillar infestation in the country.
