= Japanese foreign policy on Africa =

Intercontinental relations

Africa has been an important world region for Japan's trade and investment. Japan had some historical experience with Africa and little interest in economic ties with the region, except for development of raw material supplies.

Historically, Japan sought to maintain close ties with the United States while also establishing or sustaining positive relations with non-Communist African countries.

== Trade ==
In 1990 Africa accounted for just over 1% of Japan's imports and for just over 1% of its exports. Japan's largest trading partner in Africa in 1990 was South Africa, which accounted for 30% of Japan's exports to Africa and 50% of Japan's imports from the region. Because of trading sanctions imposed on South Africa by the United States and other countries, Japan emerged as South Africa's largest trading partner during the 1980s. This position proved embarrassing to Japan and led it to downgrade some diplomatic and economic relations with the country. Despite the fact that South Africa remained Japan's largest trading partner in the region, both exports and imports in 1988 had declined by more than one-third from their value in 1980. With the end of Apartheid and normalization of international relations of South Africa in 1994 Japan's special role ended.

From the start of the 21st century to before the Great Recession, the value of trade in Africa leapt from about US$8 billion to US$34 billion; however, by 2009, this figure had shrunk to about US$18 billion.

From 2015, Japan's trade value in Africa was estimated to be around US$24 billion.

== Investments ==
In 1989, Japan made very large increases in aid to Africa with the announcement of a US$600 million grant program for the next three years.

Investments from the 2000s onwards were primarily in South Africa with many in regards to energy and production. Other investments focused on increasing agricultural output, promoting quality education, building and maintaining infrastructure, and health management.

== See also ==
- Tokyo International Conference on African Development
