= Guinea-Bissau–India relations =

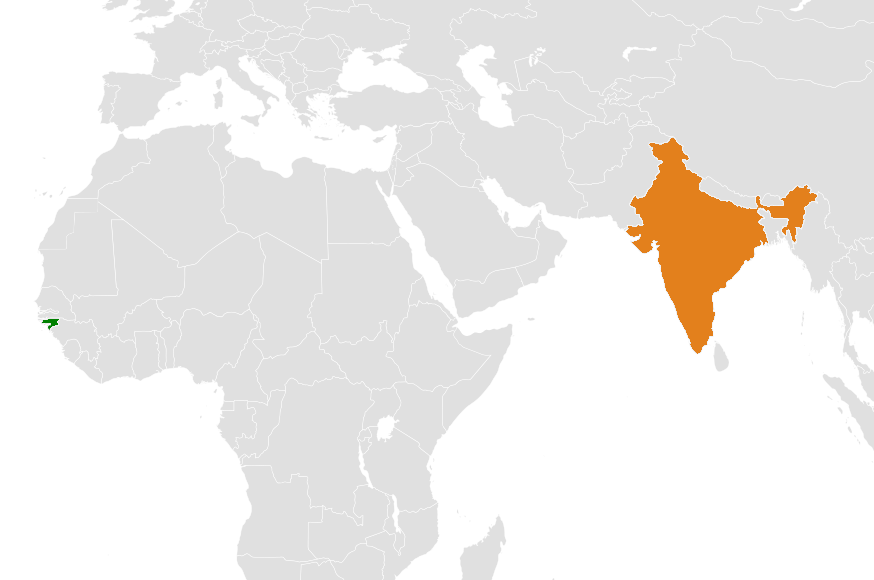

- Guinea-Bissau: India

Guinea-Bissau–India relations refers to the international relations that exist between Guinea-Bissau and India. The embassy of India in Dakar, Senegal is concurrently accredited to Guinea-Bissau. India opened an Honorary Consulate in Bissau on 28 May 2010. Guinea-Bissau has no diplomatic mission in India.

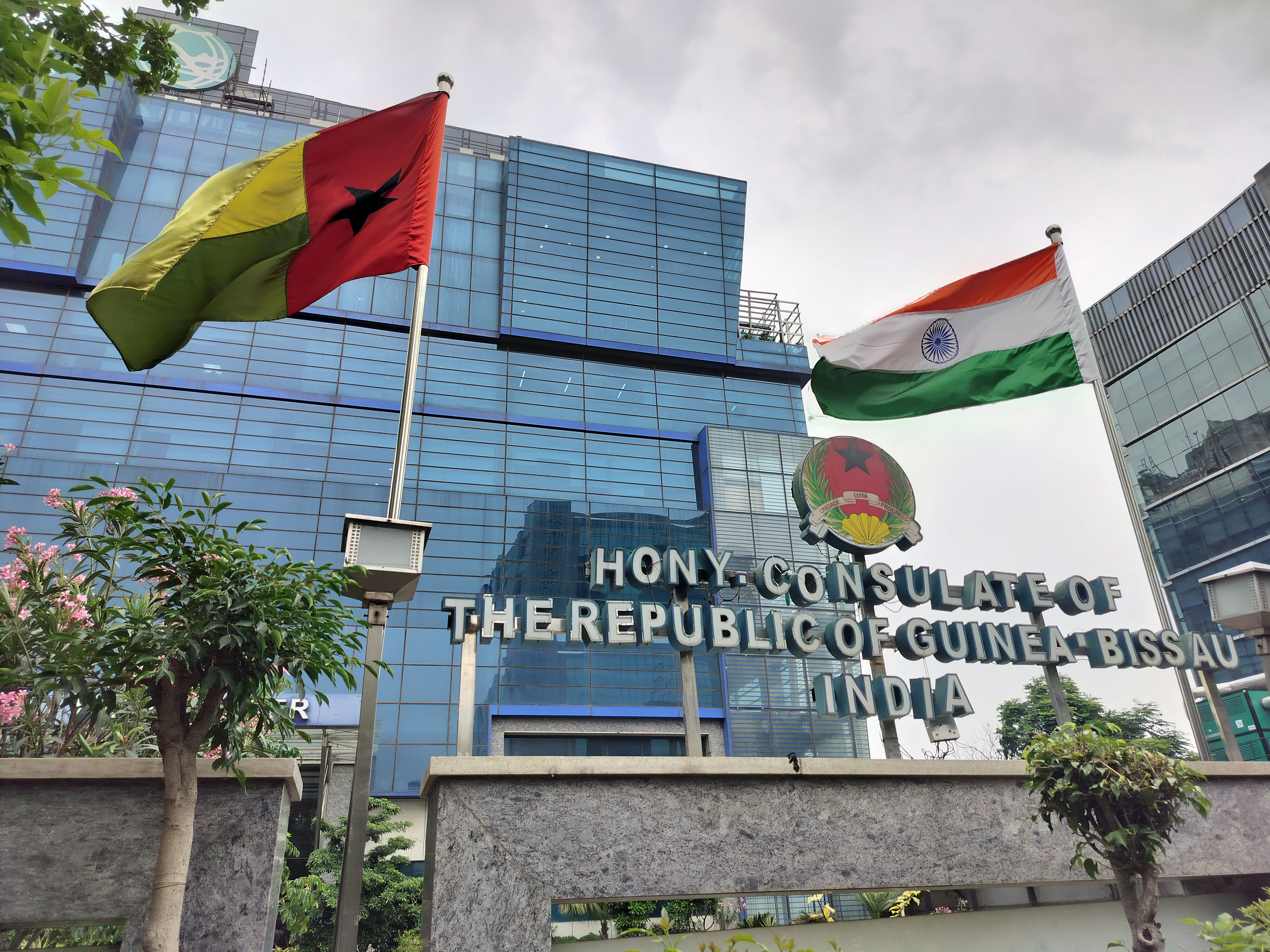
Hony. consulate of the republic of Guinea.Bissau, India

The prime minister of the transitional government of Guinea-Bissau, Rui Duarte de Barros, led a delegation that included the Minister of Foreign Affairs and the Minister of Economy to India to attend the 9th CII EXIM Bank Conclave on India Africa Project Partnership in March 2013. Minister of State for Mines and Steel, Vishnudeo Sai, visited Guinea-Bissau in September 2015 as the Prime Minister's Special Envoy. He invited President José Mário Vaz to attend the third India Africa Forum Summit in New Delhi. Vaz accepted the invitation and in October 2015, became the first Bissau-Guinean head of state to visit India. He held bilateral talks with Prime Minister Narendra Modi on 30 October 2015. Vaz was accompanied by a delegation that included Foreign Minister Artur Antonio da Silva. Silva participated in the India-Africa foreign ministers’ meeting in New Delhi along with his Indian counterpart Sushma Swaraj and several African Foreign Ministers.

Guinea-Bissau and India were among the first 19 countries to join the International Solar Alliance, proposed by Prime Minister Narendra Modi, on 15 November 2016.

== Trade ==
India is an important trade partner of Guinea-Bissau, and was Guinea-Bissau's largest destination for exports in 2010 and 2011. Guinea-Bissau is the world's fourth largest exporter of cashew nuts, and the sector accounts for 90% of the country's income and employs over 80% of its labour force making it vital to its economy. India is the largest importer of unprocessed cashews from Guinea-Bissau, importing over 90% of the country's annual cashew exports. Almost 98% of the cashew crop is exported to India for processing. Since 2011, India has increased its domestic cashew production and reduced imports from Guinea-Bissau. India's decision to slash imports of cashews in 2012 resulted in a cashew nut export crisis in Guinea-Bissau.

Bilateral trade between Guinea-Bissau and India totaled US$212.64 million in 2015–16, recording a growth of 26.46% over the previous fiscal. India exported $14.47 million worth of goods to Guinea-Bissau, and imported $198.17 million.

The Indian defence industry has supplied patrol boats to Guinea-Bissau.

In May 2008, India offered to provide Guinea-Bissau unilateral duty free tariff preferential (DFTP) market access for export of goods and services.

== Foreign aid ==
Under India-Brazil-South Africa (IBSA) Dialogue Forum’s “Poverty Alleviation Funding Facility”, an Indian expert visited Guinea-Bissau in early 2006 to help the country in rice cultivation, and an Indian team of experts visited to assist in a solar power project.

Guinea-Bissau is a founding member of the TEAM-9 initiative. Under TEAM-9, the Indian government has provided the country with a line of credit worth $25 million, which includes a $5 million line of credit for the food processing and agricultural sector and $20 million for rural electrification projects. IBSA Trust Fund Board approved a sum of $830,000 in February 2009 for renewable energy and agricultural capacity building in Guinea Bissau.

Citizens of Guinea-Bissau are eligible for scholarships under the Indian Technical and Economic Cooperation Programme and the Indian Council for Cultural Relations. Five Bissau-Guinean women from rural regions attended training at Barefoot College in Tilonia, Rajasthan in 2009. After completing their course, they returned to Guinea-Bissau and successfully installed solar energy facilities in their villages.

== Indians in Guinea-Bissau ==
As of December 2016, around 100 Indians reside in Guinea-Bissau on a long-term basis. About 40-50 Indians visit the country annually during cashew season, staying in the country for a few weeks to negotiate, purchase and ship consignments of raw cashew to India.
