= India–Malawi relations =

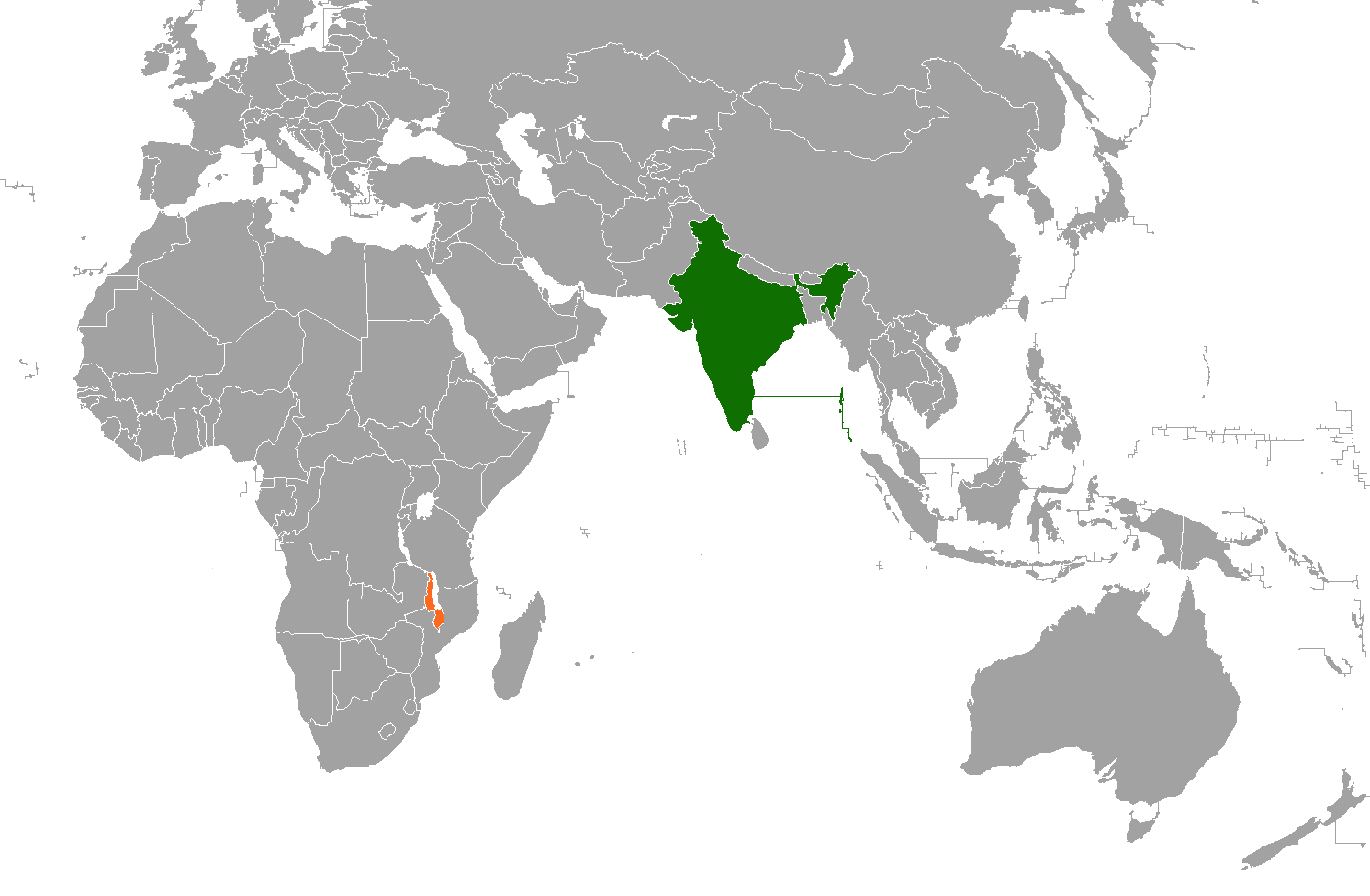
- India: Malawi

India–Malawi relations refers to the international relations that exist between India and Malawi.

== History ==
Trade relations between India and Malawi date back to the 18th century, when Indian tradesmen (mostly Gujaratis) arrived in Africa. India established diplomatic relations with Malawi in 1964, the year of the latter's independence. Indian Prime Minister Indira Gandhi visited the country in 1964 to participate in Malawi's independence celebrations. The Indian diplomatic mission in Malawi was closed in May 1993, and India's interests in the country were transferred to the Indian embassy in Zambia.

Malawi opened its High Commission in New Delhi in February 2007. Several Malawian leaders have received their education from universities in India, including President Bingu wa Mutharika and Foreign Minister George Chaponda. Mutharika secured a Bachelor of Commerce and a master's degree in economics from the University of Delhi in 1961 and 1963 respectively. During his state visit to India as President of Malawi, Mutharika was awarded an honorary degree of Doctor of Letters by his alma mater on 4 November 2010. Chaponda studied at the Delhi University between 1963 and 1968.

H. Kamutzu Banda, the first President of Malawi, visited India in 1983 to attend the Commonwealth Heads of Government Meeting. President Bingu wa Mutharika visited India on 2–7 November 2010. During the visit, the two sides signed a general co-operation agreement, as well as MoUs on cooperation covering the fields of mineral resources development, rural development, and health and medicine. During the visit, Indian Prime Minister Manmohan Singh announced that India would re-open its High Commission in Malawi in early 2012. The High Commission in Lilongwe was re-opened in February 2012. Vanlalhuma served as the first High Commissioner to Malawi from 21 June 2013 until 13 June 2016. Suresh Kumar Menon assumed office as the second High Commissioner to the country from 9 August 2016 to 31 January 2019.Anurag Bhusan served as the third High Commissioner from 6 July 2019 to 4 February 2021. S. Gopalakrishnan assumed office as the fourth High Commissioner of India to Malawi on 13 March 2021.

Indian Vice-President Hamid Ansari visited Malawi on 7–9 January 2010. During Ansari's visit the two countries signed agreements on cooperation in agriculture and allied sectors and development of small scale enterprises in Malawi. Two nations also agreed on a protocol of consultations between their respective foreign ministries.

Malawi supports India in the Kashmir dispute, supported India's position at the First Committee of the UN General Assembly regarding the nuclear tests in 1998, and also supports India's candidature for a permanent seat in the UN Security Council. Malawi also voted for India's election to the first United Nations Human Rights Council in 2006.

Following a meeting between India's Minister of Heavy Industries and Public Enterprise G. M. Siddeshwara and Malawi President Peter Mutharika in July 2015, the latter praised relations between the two countries declaring that Malawi had benefited greatly from the relationship. Mutharika stated, "In 2008, we got a generous line of credit from the government of India to the tune of $163 million, which assisted us in areas of agriculture, petroleum storage tanks, sugar processing plant and capacity building. In 2010, we also got a credit of $5 million, which assisted us in areas of science and technology and the health care sector. We are very much appreciative of that."

== Economic relations ==
=== Trade ===
India was Malawi's 3rd largest trading partner in 2015, after South Africa and China. India is the 4th largest source of imports to Malawi, and 7th largest destination for exports in 2015.

Bilateral trade between India and Malawi totaled US$250.80 million in 2014–15. India exported $214.02 million worth of goods to Malawi, and imported $36.78 million. The main commodities exported by India to Malawi are textile yarns, fabrics, transport equipment, pharmaceuticals, machinery and equipment. The major commodities imported by India from Malawi are pulses, chickpeas and other agricultural commodities.

Under a trade agreement signed between India and Malawi, both nations have accorded each other the Most Favoured Nation (MFN) status. Malawi is also a beneficiary of India's Duty Free Tariff Preference (DFTP) scheme for Least Developed Countries (LDCs). The DFTP scheme, introduced in April 2008, allows Malawi to export several commodities to India duty-free. The introduction of the DFTP scheme resulted in a massive 1,364.62% rise in Malawi's exports to India between 2008–09 and 2009–10. It also shifted the balance of trade in favour of Malawi for the first time in history, although the trade balance shifted back in favour of India in subsequent years.

=== Investments ===
Between 2005 and 2016, 96 Indian companies were registered in Malawi. Indian firms in the country are involved in agro processing, chemicals, energy, financial services and insurance, food processing, information technology, software development, logistics, textile, cosmetics, pharmaceuticals, cement, manufacturing, and the hospitality industry. Bharti Airtel, Tech Mahindra, Hi Tos Linear Agency Pvt Ltd, Weismann Ltd, TATA, Mahindra, Godrej, Kirloskar, Ashok Leyland, TVS, and Bajaj Auto, Tech Mahindra, L&T, Kalpataru Power Transmission Ltd are some major Indian companies operating in the country. Dhunseri Petrochem & Tea Ltd (DPTL) invested in tea estates in Malawi in 2012.

The Malawi High Commission in New Delhi opened a business centre at the South Gujarat Chamber of Commerce in Surat on 16 October 2013, aiming to boost trade and investment from India in Malawi.

== Indian foreign aid ==
India dispatched 1,000 metric tonnes of rice on 9 March 2026, from Nhava Sheva Port to support the drought affected communities in Malawi because of current worsening conditions in food security in Malawi, reinforcing to commitment to food security and humanitarian assistance. This was done following the drought caused by the El Niño effect. In a social media post, Indian External Affairs' spokesperson Randhir Jaiswal said that the consignment is a reiteration of India’s continued commitment to supporting partners in the Global South and advancing the spirit of South-South cooperation.

In 2009, India provided tractors, disc harrows, heavy earth moving machinery, graders, bull dozers and other equipment worth $22.91 million to the Government of Malawi. India announced a $19.93 million project to construct cotton ginneries at Ngabu, Ngara and Balaka in 2009. The plants were opened in 2012 and transferred to the Government of Malawi. Each plant has an output of 250 bales (1 bale = 250 kg) of cotton per day. India began construction of petrol and diesel fuel storage facilities at Lilongwe, Mzuzu and Blantyre in March 2013 at a cost of $26.75 million. The facilities were commissioned and transferred to Malawi in October 2016.

India provided Malawi a grant of $5 million in January 2010. It also supplied science and laboratory equipment, and medical equipment worth $3 million to the Government of Malawi. $1 million of tractors and implements was gifted to Malawi in August 2015, and a grant of $1 million was provided to set up a Business Incubator Centre in Malawi. India donated $1 million worth of essential medicines on 1 July 2015 towards disaster relief operations, and also donated medicines and tent ridges to the Malawi Department of Disaster Management in September 2016. The Indian government provided another $1 million grants in response to State of Disaster declared by the President of Malawi in 2016.

India spent $8.46 million to construct dal processing plants in Liwonde and Luchenza. Construction on the plants began and in September 2015, and both were commissioned by July 2016. The country spent $33.64 million to construct a sugar processing plant in Salima, the sugarcane producing district of Malawi. Construction of the Salima Sugar plant began in March 2013 and was completed in October 2015. The plant consumes 1250 metric tons of sugarcane in 8 hours of operations. In the first two months since operations began, the plant produced 300 tons of sugar.

Citizens of Malawi are eligible for scholarships under the Indian Technical and Economic Cooperation Programme and the Indian Council for Cultural Relations. India has also transferred technology to Malawi under the ITEC programme.

India is a preferred destination for Malawians seeking medical treatment. Indian hospitals such as Artemis Hospital in Gurgaon, Kokilaben Dhirubhai Ambani Hospital & Medical Research Institute and Fortis Hospitals have introduced specific arrangements to cater to citizens of Malawi.

== Indians in Malawi ==
The initial Indian migration to Malawi began after the latter became a British colony in 1891. The British transported Indians to Malawi and Mozambique to work on a rail project between the two African nations.

As of December 2016, 8,000 persons of Indian origin reside in Malawi, most of whom are of Gujarati origin. They primarily reside in cities such as Lilongwe, Blantyre, Zomba and Mzuzu. Most members of the Indian community that have lived in the country for more than one generation hold British citizenship. Indian citizens in the country are primarily engaged in trading, agriculture and agro business, pharmaceuticals, and the retail and hospitality industries.
