= Chad–India relations =

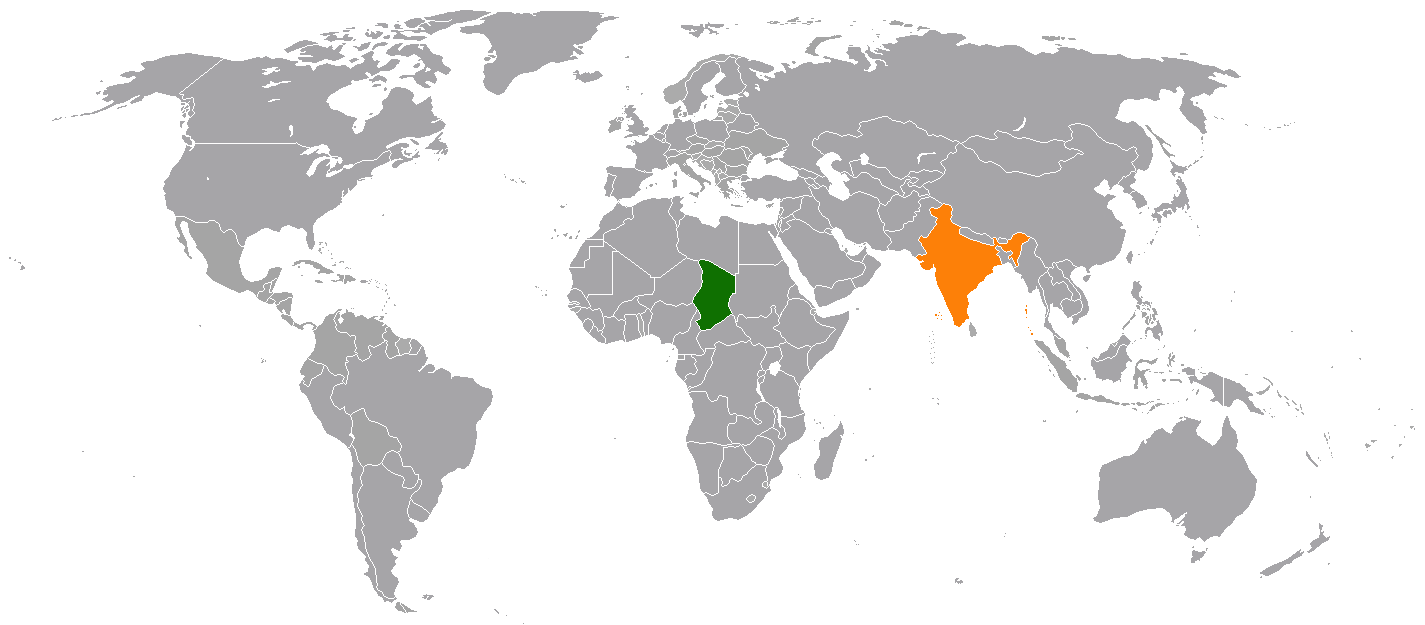
- Chad: India

Chad–India relations refers to the bilateral relations between Chad and India. The High Commission of India in Abuja, Nigeria is concurrently accredited to Chad. India also maintains an Honorary Consulate in N'Djamena. In 2019, Chad opened a resident embassy in New Delhi.

== High level visits ==
Relations between Chad and India have witnessed significant growth since 2004, with many high level bilateral visits and interactions having taken place. Chadian Deputy Prime Minister and Foreign Minister Nagoum Yamassoum visited New Delhi in March 2005 to attend the first ever India-Africa Project Partnership conclave. He is the first Chadian government official to visit the country. Minister of State for Agriculture Arun Yadav visited N'Djamena on 10 May 2011, and met with President Idriss Deby Itno. Yadav was the first Indian government official to visit the country. President Itno led a 32-member delegation on a visit to New Delhi to attend the third India-Africa Forum Summit in October 2015. The delegation several Cabinet Ministers and other high-level Chadian officials. Itno held bilateral talks with Prime Minister Narendra Modi on 28 October.

== Trade ==
Bilateral trade between Chad and India totaled US$364.36 million in 2015–16. India's exports to Chad have grown steadily from $11.90 million in 2010–11 to $43.49 million in 2015–16. Imports from Chad were a mere $150,000 in 2011–12, grew sharply to $157.15 million the following fiscal, before declining by 73% and 52% in the following two fiscal years respectively. Bilateral figures do not reflect the full extent of Chad's imports from India, as the country procures several Indian goods from Dubai, Cameroon and Nigeria. In the 2015-16 financial year, India began importing crude oil from Chad resulting in a 411% increase in imports. Chad's exports to India grew from $62.77 million in 2010–11 to $320.87 million in 2015–16. Crude oil accounted for 97% of the country's exports to India in 2015–16.

In June 2010, Bharti Airtel struck a deal to buy Zain's mobile operations in 15 African countries, including Chad, for $8.97 billion, in India's second biggest overseas acquisition after Tata Steel's US$13 billion buy of the Corus Group in 2007. Bharti Airtel completed the acquisition on 8 June 2010. Airtel has invested over $100 million to expand its network in the country, and is currently the largest mobile network operator in Chad.

India offered to provide Chad unilateral duty free tariff preferential market (DFTP) access for export of goods and services in 2008. However, as of December 2016, the Government of Chad has not officially signed the agreement.

== Foreign aid ==
India donated 5,000 metric tonnes of rice to Chad in 2004. India provided Chad with lines of credit worth $50 million for five manufacturing projects under the TEAM-9 initiative. The projects include setting up a bicycle manufacturing, a plant for manufacturing and assembly of agricultural tractors, power tillers, trailers and implements, a steel billet plant and rolling mill, a cotton yarn plant, and a fruit juice plant.

Chad signed an agreement on 19 January 2012 to avail a $40.32 million line of credit for four projects in the country - a solar rural electrification project ($15 million), the addition of weaving and processing capacities to a spinning mill ($15.90 million), establishing a compost production unit ($7.20 million), a production unit for livestock feed ($2.22 million). On 14 November 2013, the plan for a livestock feed plant was replaced an animal feed plant, and a line of credit worth $9.3 million was provided. In May 2012, India provided a line of credit of $18.08 million to establish a pharmaceutical manufacturing plant.

The Government of Chad signed an MoU to implement the Pan-African e-Network project in May 2009. As of December 2016, TCIL is carrying out installation for the project in N'Djamena.

Citizens of Chad are eligible for scholarships under the Indian Technical and Economic Cooperation Programme and the Indian Council for Cultural Relations. Chadian diplomats have also attended the Professional Course for Foreign Diplomats (PCFD) organised by the Foreign Service Institute of the Ministry of External Affairs. Chadian nationals have also received Hindi language training fellowships in India.

== Indians in Chad ==
As of December 2016, about 200 Indians reside in Chad. They are engaged in oil projects and foreign trade, or employed by international organisations, missionaries, or Bharti Airtel. Some cases of mistreatment of Indian workers by local employers and authorities have been reported. Almost the entire Indian community in Chad was evacuated by the High Commission in Abuja following rebel attacks in N'Djamena in February 2008. The community returned to the city after the end of the violence.
