= Cameroon–India relations =

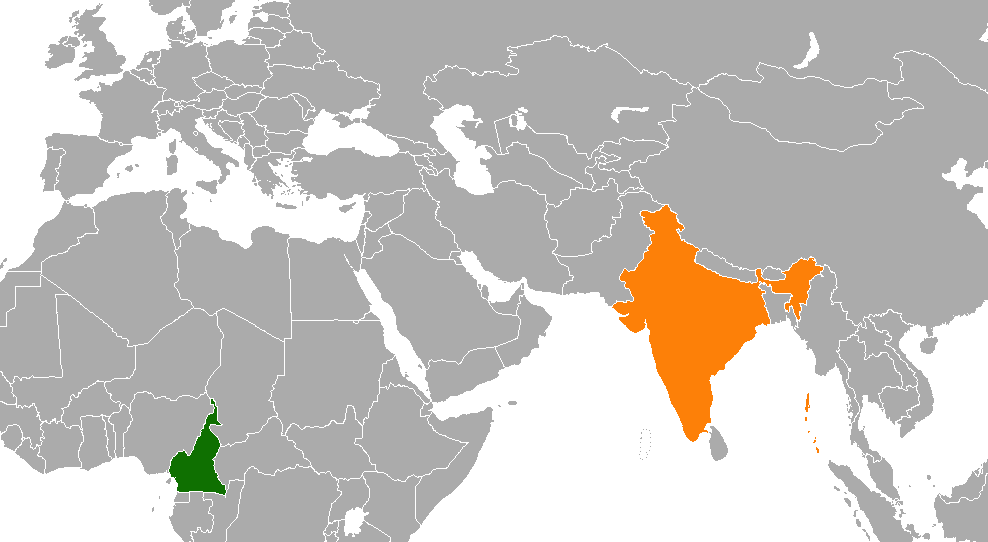
- Cameroon: India

Cameroon–India relations refers to the bilateral relations between Cameroon and India. The High Commission of India in Yaoundé, Cameroon, headed by High Commissioner H.E. Ambassador Vijay Khanduja [IFS], serves as India's diplomatic representation to Cameroon. India also maintains an Honorary Consulate in Douala. Cameroon has recently operationalised a High Commission in New Delhi with its first High Commissioner yet to be appointed.

== History ==
Diplomatic relations between Cameroon and India were established in 1960, the year the former declared independence. Cameroonian leaders have expressed appreciation for India's contributions to Africa, its secular democracy and economic progress, and its leadership in the Non-Aligned Movement (NAM). Cameroon voted for the candidature of Indian diplomat Kamalesh Sharma for Commonwealth Secretary-General.

Cameroonian President Paul Biya visited India in 1983 to the attend the NAM Summit. Prime Minister Philémon Yang, along with 7 Ministers and a business delegation, visited New Delhi in March 2013 to participate in the Africa-CII/Exim Bank Conclave. Several other Cameroonian ministers and government officials have also visited the country. From India, the highest level visits to Cameroon have been at the level of minister of state. The Minister of State for Industrial Development visited Cameroon in February 1988 and was the first Indian government official to visit the country. The Minister of State for External Affairs visited Cameroon in April 1990, and the Minister of State for HRD Ram Shankar Katheria in September 2015.

Cameroonian External Relations Minister Mbella Mbella led the delegation to the third India-Africa Forum Summit in October 2015. He also held talks with his Indian counterpart, Sushma Swaraj, and the two discussed militancy in Africa. Cameroon requested India's help to build its defence sector and also in combating Boko Haram. In response, India sent officials to train Cameroonian defence forces in counter-insurgency and anti-terror operations.

== Trade ==
Cameroon and India signed a trade agreement in February 1968. India was the largest destination for exports from Cameroon in 2015. Bilateral trade between Cameroon and India totaled US$748.3 million in 2015–16, declining from $994.48 million the previous fiscal. India exported $191 million worth of goods to Cameroon, and imported $557.43 million. The bulk of India's imports from Cameroon are crude oil and petroleum products which accounted for 87.42% of imports in 2015–16.

As of December 2016, around 60 Indian companies operate in Cameroon primarily involved in trading of general merchandise. Indians have invested an estimated $10–15 million in Cameroon in industries such as plastics, carton, biscuits, smelting of scrap, alcohol bottling and distribution. Cameroon Alumina Ltd., a consortium of Hindalco, Dubai Aluminium and American firm Hydramine, signed an agreement for bauxite exploration with Cameroonian authorities in May 2009. Hindalco holds a 45% stake in the consortium. The Jindal Group is involved in iron ore mining projects in the country. India in 2012, through the EXIM Bank of India, has provided an LOC worth $42 million for a Cassava plantation project in Cameroon.

NRI-owned agribusiness firm Olam International, which is based in Nigeria, also operates in Cameroon. The firm owns over 7,500 hectares of coffee plantations and 12,000 hectares of cocoa plantations. Olam is the first and second largest producer respectively of these crops in Cameroon. The firm also imports rice into the country, and recorded an annual revenue of about $120 million from operations in Cameroon.

India – Cameroon Bilateral Trade Statistics (Value in US $ million)
Year	India's Exports to Cameroon	India's Imports from Cameroon	Total Trade
2015-16	191	558	749
2016-17	149	359	508
2017-18	194	213	407
2018-19	179	344	523
2019-20	228	676	904
2020-21	279	202	481

== Cultural relations ==
Indian films are popular in Cameroon, and are regularly broadcast on some local television stations. The Cameroon national football team has participated in the Nehru Cup organized by the AIFF on several occasions.

== Indians in Cameroon ==
As of December 2016, about 700-800 Indian expatriates reside in Cameroon. Most are involved in trading and small business, and some are professionals. Although the community is generally well-regarded, there have been some reported instances of violence against Indians and Indian-owned properties. An Indian manufacturing plant in Douala was vandalized during the political crisis in Cameroon in February 2008. Some incidents of physical violence against Indians have been reported, often stemming from commercial disputes.

== Foreign aid ==
India donated 60 tractors and agricultural implements to the Government of Cameroon in 2007. India extended a line of credit worth $37.65 million on 29 May 2009 to fund rice and maize farm plantations. The Pan-African e-Network project was implemented in Cameroon in June 2010. India established tele-medicine and tele-education projects at the Cameroon State Regional University Yaoundé and its hospital. India provided Cameroon with a line of credit of $42 million in September 2012 for Cassava plantation projects in the country.

Citizens of Cameroon are eligible for scholarships under the Indian Technical and Economic Cooperation Programme and the Indian Council for Cultural Relations. Cameroonians diplomats have also attended the PCFD course organised by the Foreign Service Institute of the Ministry of External Affairs.

== See also ==
- Indian High Commission in Cameroon
