= Equatorial Guinea–India relations =

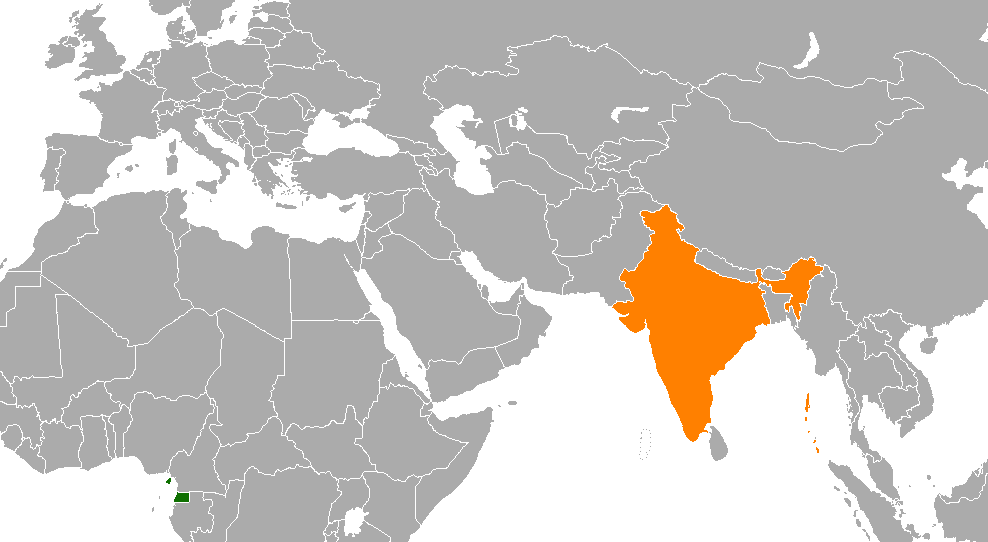
- Equatorial Guinea: India

The Republic of Equatorial Guinea and the Republic of India maintain diplomatic relations.

== History ==
Relations between Equatorial Guinea and India have existed since before the independence of the former in 1968. In April 2004, E. Barwa, Joint Secretary (West Africa) in the Ministry of External Affairs (MEA) visited Malabo in April 2004, and held talks with the President, as well as some Ministers and senior officials of the Equatorial Guinea Government. During the visit, Equatorial Guinea signed the TEAM 9 agreement with India.

The High Commission of India in Lagos, Nigeria was concurrently accredited to Equatorial Guinea from 2005 until 2008, when the accreditation was transferred to the Embassy of India in Luanda, Angola. India Ambassador to Angola and Equatorial Guinea A.R. Ghanashyam presented his credentials in March 2008, and held discussions with the President and Foreign Minister. Both the President and Foreign Minister expressed their desire to visit India to improve bilateral cooperation. The Foreign Minister also requested India's assistance to provide English language training to 80 Equatorial Guineans. The Government of Equatorial Guinea also proposed draft agreements to establish a Joint Commission and for a General Cooperation Agreement.

Minister of State for IT & Telecom Sachin Pilot visited Equatorial Guinea as the Prime Minister's Special Envoy and officially invited President Teodoro Obiang Nguema Mbasogo to attend the second India Africa Summit. President Mbasogo, who was serving as the Chairman of the African Union at the time, and Indian Prime Minister Manmohan Singh co-chaired the Summit in Addis Ababa, Ethiopia.

Joint Secretary (West Africa) in the MEA Rajinder Bhagat headed an Indian delegation to the 19th Ordinary Session of the Executive Council of the African Union in Malabo. India attended the Summit, which was chaired by Equatorial Guinea, as an observer. India also sent a delegation to serve as observers at the council's 25th Ordinary Session in Malabo.

Minister of State for AYUSH Shripad Yesso Naik visited Equatorial Guinea on 25 August 2015 as the Prime Minister's Special Envoy and officially invited President Mbasogo to attend the third India Africa Summit. He also met with the Foreign Minister. The invitation resulted in first ever visit by an Equatorial Guinean President to India, when Mbasogo led a high level delegation to attend the Summit in New Delhi in October 2015. He held bilateral talks with Prime Minister Narendra Modi on 28 October.

In October 2015, India approved Equatorial Guinea's request to open a diplomatic mission in New Delhi. The embassy was operational in October 2019.

== Trade ==
Bilateral trade between Equatorial Guinea and India grew from US$4.87 million in 2006–07 to $764.39 million in 2014–15. India exported $15.01 million worth of goods to Equatorial Guinea, and imported $749.38 million in 2014–15. Between the 1998–99 and 2002-03 fiscal years, India made no imports from Equatorial Guinea between 1998 and 2002, and from 2003 to 2005. Indian imports from the country in 2002-03 and 2005-06 fiscal years was negligible.

The main commodities exported by India to Equatorial Guinea are fish, crustaceans, and iron and steel. The major commodities imported by India from Equatorial Guinea are crude oil and oil derivatives, seeds, medicinal plants, ore, slag and ash, wood and wood articles, natural or cultured pearls, stones, and imitation jewelry.

ONGC Videsh Ltd signed an agreement with the Government of Equatorial Guinea for cooperation in oil and gas sector on 21 January 2016, on the sidelines of the 4th India-Africa Hydrocarbons Summit in New Delhi. The Ministry of Mines, Industry and Energy of Equatorial Guinea hosted an Equatorial Guinea-India Hydrocarbons & Industry Forum in New Delhi on 22 January 2016, with aim of attracting Indian investment in the country's energy, hydrocarbons and industrial sectors.

== Foreign aid ==
In 2005, the EXIM Bank of India had extended a line of credit (LOC) worth $15 million to establish a potable drinking water project in Equatorial Guinea in 2005. However, the LOC was cancelled in June 2012 after the Equatorial Guinean Government failed to prepare relevant documents and fulfill other required formalities to obtain an LOC within the specified time period. India offered to establish 5 Centers on Geoinformatic Applications for Rural Development in Africa at the second India Africa Forum Summit, one of which would be located in Equatorial Guinea. The Government of Equatorial Guinea approved the construction of the Center in July 2012.

Citizens of Equatorial Guinea are eligible for scholarships under the Indian Technical and Economic Cooperation Programme and the Indian Council for Cultural Relations.

== Indians in Equatorial Guinea ==
As of January 2016, about 300 Indian citizens reside in Equatorial Guinea, all of whom live in Malabo. The community is primarily employed by departmental stores and hotels. Some Indian are employees of oil companies executing short-term assignment at offshore oil rigs.
