= India–Mauritania relations =

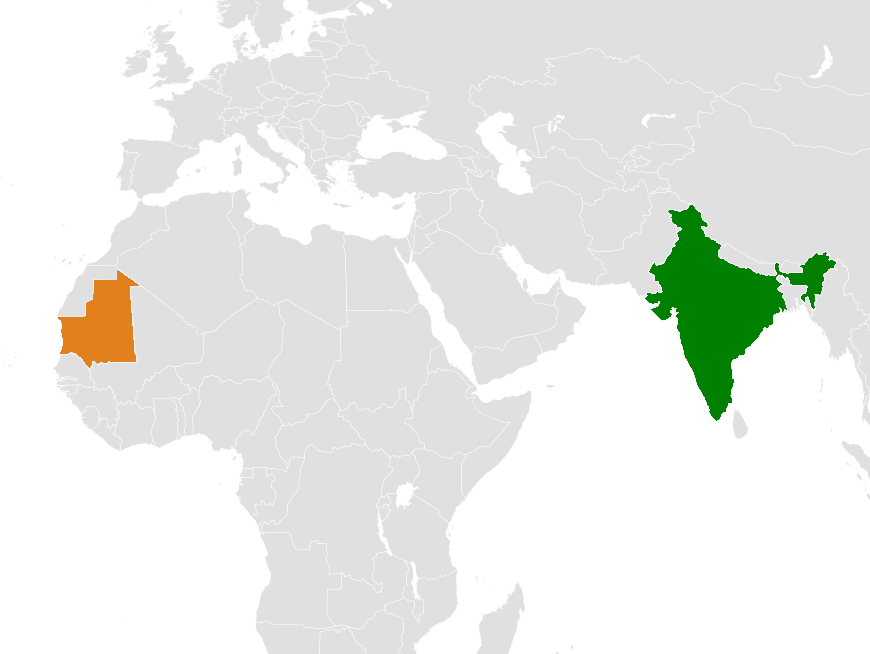
- India: Mauritania

India–Mauritania relations are the bilateral relations between India and Mauritania. Mr. Naresh Kumar, a career diplomat of Indian Foreign Service, joined as the first resident Ambassador of India to the Islamic Republic of Mauritania on 3 May, 2024.

== Diplomatic missions ==
Mauritania was originally concurrently accredited to the Embassy of India in Dakar, Senegal. The accreditation was transferred to the Embassy of India in Bamako, Mali, following its opening in May 2009. India also maintains an Honorary Consulate General in Nouakchott. Mauritania has no diplomatic mission in India.

== History ==
Mauritanian Minister for Economy and Development Didi ould Tah visited India in 2009 to participate in the CII Africa Conclave. The Mauritanian Ministers of Economic Development and of Rural Development visited New Delhi in March 2013 to attend the 9th CII EXIM-Bank Conclave. President Mohamed Ould Abdel Aziz attended the second India–Africa Forum Summit (IAFS) hosted by India at Addis Ababa, Ethiopia in May 2011. Aziz also held bilateral discussions with Prime Minister Manmohan Singh on the sidelines of the Summit.

At the request of Prime Minister Narendra Modi, President Abdel Aziz led a high level delegation including Cabinet Ministers and other senior officials to attend the third India-Africa Forum Summit in New Delhi in October 2015. This was the first visit by a Mauritanian head of state to India. He held bilateral discussion with Prime Minister Modi on 29 October. Modi invited Mauritania to join the International Solar Alliance. Aziz announced that Mauritania would open an embassy in New Delhi to boost bilateral relations.

== Economic relations ==
Bilateral trade between India and Mauritania grew from US$2.24 million in 1996–97 to $102.4 million in 2014–15. Trade declined to $76.91 million in 2015–16. India exported $58.35 million worth of goods to Mauritania, and imported $18.56 million in 2015–16. The main commodities exported by India to Mauritania are cereals, tanning and dyeing extracts, plastic products, cotton, ceramic, iron and steel articles, nuclear reactors, boilers and related mechanical appliances, and non-railway vehicles. The major commodities imported by India from Mauritania are iron and steel, ores, slag, ash, cotton and copper made articles, aluminium, and electrical machinery.

Mauritania has no investments in India. Some Indian mining, power and oil companies operate in Mauritania. Several Indian firms have been involved in executing projects funded by lines of credit from the Indian Government. Archean Group became the first Indian company to begin commercial mining of phosphates in Mauritania in November 2010. Archean operates in the country through a joint venture with the Government of Mauritania called the Bofal Indo Mining Company S.A.

In 2024, India exported $114 million to Mauritania, with its top export being light pure woven cotton. Mauritania exported $31.5 million to India, and its top export was scrap iron.

== Cultural relations ==
Goods of Indian origin are commonly found at markets and among retailers in Mauritania. Indian fabric is specifically used to manufacture a traditional dress worn by Mauritanian women. North Indian clothing is popular among Mauritanians. Dubbed Indian films and television shows are popular in the country.

== Indians in Mauritania ==
As of January 2016, about 250-300 Indians reside in Mauritania. The community is primarily engaged in mining, power, pharmaceuticals, oil and gas exploration, construction and agro-industrial sectors. About 50 Indians are employed as labourers at various construction sites in the country. There is also a small group of Catholic nuns from the Mangaluru-based Bethany Sisters who run a school and a hospital in Mauritania.

== Foreign aid ==
India provides developmental, human resource development and infrastructural aid to Mauritania through direct bilateral assistance, the New Partnership for Africa's Development (NEPAD) and through IAFS initiatives. India implemented the Pan-African e-Network project, which it had proposed at the first IAFS in 2008, in Mauritania. Several other proposals for assistance have also been made under the IAFS such as the establishment of a Farm Science Centre in Mauritania. India offered to establish a Centre for English Language Training in the country in September 2011. Mauritania was also selected as one of five African nations to set up a Human Settlement Centre.

In January 2010, India provided two lines of credit of $15 million for agro-industries and $6.8 million for a drinking water project in Mauritania. A portion of the funds were used by the Government of Mauritania to procure harvesters and other agricultural machinery. India also extended a $65.68 million line of credit to Mauritania for a solar-diesel hybrid rural electrification project in the country.

Citizens of Mauritania are eligible for scholarships under the Indian Technical and Economic Cooperation Programme, the Special Commonwealth Assistance for Africa Programme (SCAAP), and the Indian Council for Cultural Relations, as well as Indian agricultural scholarships administered through the African Union.
