= Gabon–India relations =

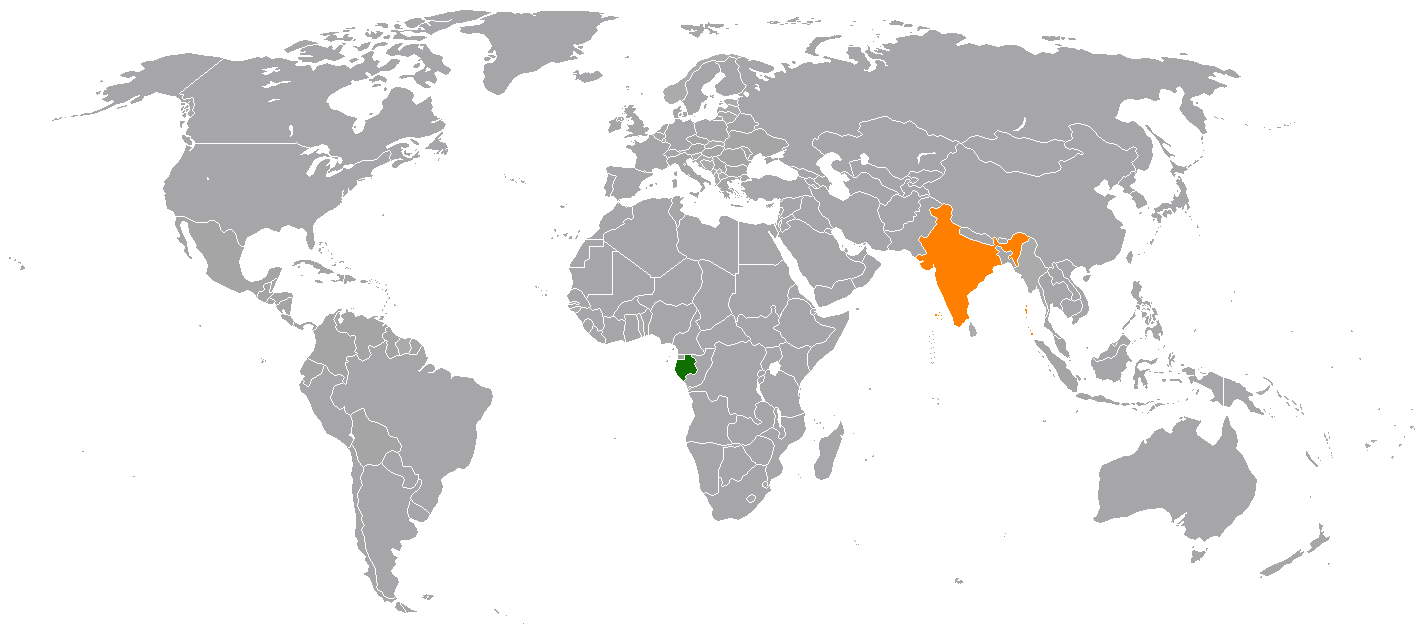
- Gabon: India

Gabon–India relations are the international relations between Gabon and India. Gabon maintains an embassy in New Delhi. The Embassy of India in Kinshasa, Democratic Republic of the Congo is jointly accredited to Gabon. India also maintains an honorary consulate in Libreville.

== History ==
Senior Minister for National Defence of Gabon Ali Bongo Ondimba visited India in November 2007. He visited India again in October 2015 as president to attend the 3rd India-Africa Forum Summit in New Delhi. Several Gabonese ministers have also visited India. The only visit by an Indian government official to Gabon occurred in September 2015, when Minister of State for Human Resource Development and Special Envoy of the Prime Minister Ram Shankar Katheria visited Libreville and met with President Ondimba.

Varsha Pallavi, Economic Assistant to the Head of the Embassy of Gabon in New Delhi, represented the country at the India-Africa Agribusiness Forum organized by FICCI, the Ministry of Agriculture and the Ministry of Commerce and Industry in February 2016. The Forum was also attended by Indian Minister of Agriculture Radha Mohan Singh and senior ministers from Botswana, Seychelles, Zambia and other African nations.

== Trade ==
Bilateral trade between Gabon and India totaled US$142.45 million in 2015–16, declining sharply from $835.73 million the previous fiscal. India exported $36.82 million worth of goods to Gabon, and imported $105.63 million. The main commodities exported by India to Gabon are meat and meat products, pharmaceuticals, cotton, iron and steel. The major commodities imported by India from Gabon are wood and wood articles, ores, slag and ash.

In June 2010, Bharti Airtel struck a deal to buy Zain's mobile operations in 15 African countries, including Gabon, for $8.97 billion, in India's second biggest overseas acquisition after Tata Steel's US$13 billion buy of Corus in 2007. Bharti Airtel completed the acquisition on 8 June 2010. Tata Chemicals announced in April 2011 that it would invest $290 million to acquire a 25.1% stake from Singaporean firm Olam International in a urea manufacturing project located near the port town of Port-Gentil. Tata stated that it would export 25% of the plant's total produce to India. Oil India Ltd. (OIL), in partnership with Indian Oil Ltd., conducted oil exploration in Shakti Block, Lamberele. OIL discovered 44 million barrels of oil at the site in 2013.

Indian firms such as Ramky Infrastructure Ltd. and M3M India Limited have won contracts to develop the infrastructure sector in Gabon.

== Foreign aid ==
India provided Gabon with a line of credit (LOC) worth $14.5 million in March 2007 to build 300 houses and amenities in Bikele near Libreville. Another LOC worth $67.19 million was provided to upgrade Gabon's broadcasting facilities.

Gabon was among the first 15 African countries in which India implemented the Pan African e-network project. Tele-education, Tele-medicine and VVIP connectivity were established in Libreville under the project. At the first India Africa Forum Summit in New Delhi in April 2008, India agreed to establish a vocational training centre in Gabon as part of a "Plan of Action" with the African Union.

Citizens of Gabon are eligible for scholarships under the Indian Technical and Economic Cooperation Programme and the Indian Council for Cultural Relations. Several officials from Gabon have also received training programs under the AIFS.

== Cultural relations ==
Ambassador of Gabon Desire Koumba inaugurated the 4th Global Festival of Journalism held at Marwah Studios, Noida in February 2016.

== Indians in Gabon ==
As of December 2016, around 100 Indians is reported to be residing in Gabon. They are one of the fastest growing businesspersons who are primarily involved in the infrastructure projects, trading affairs, export of timber and metal scrap.
