= India–Somalia relations =

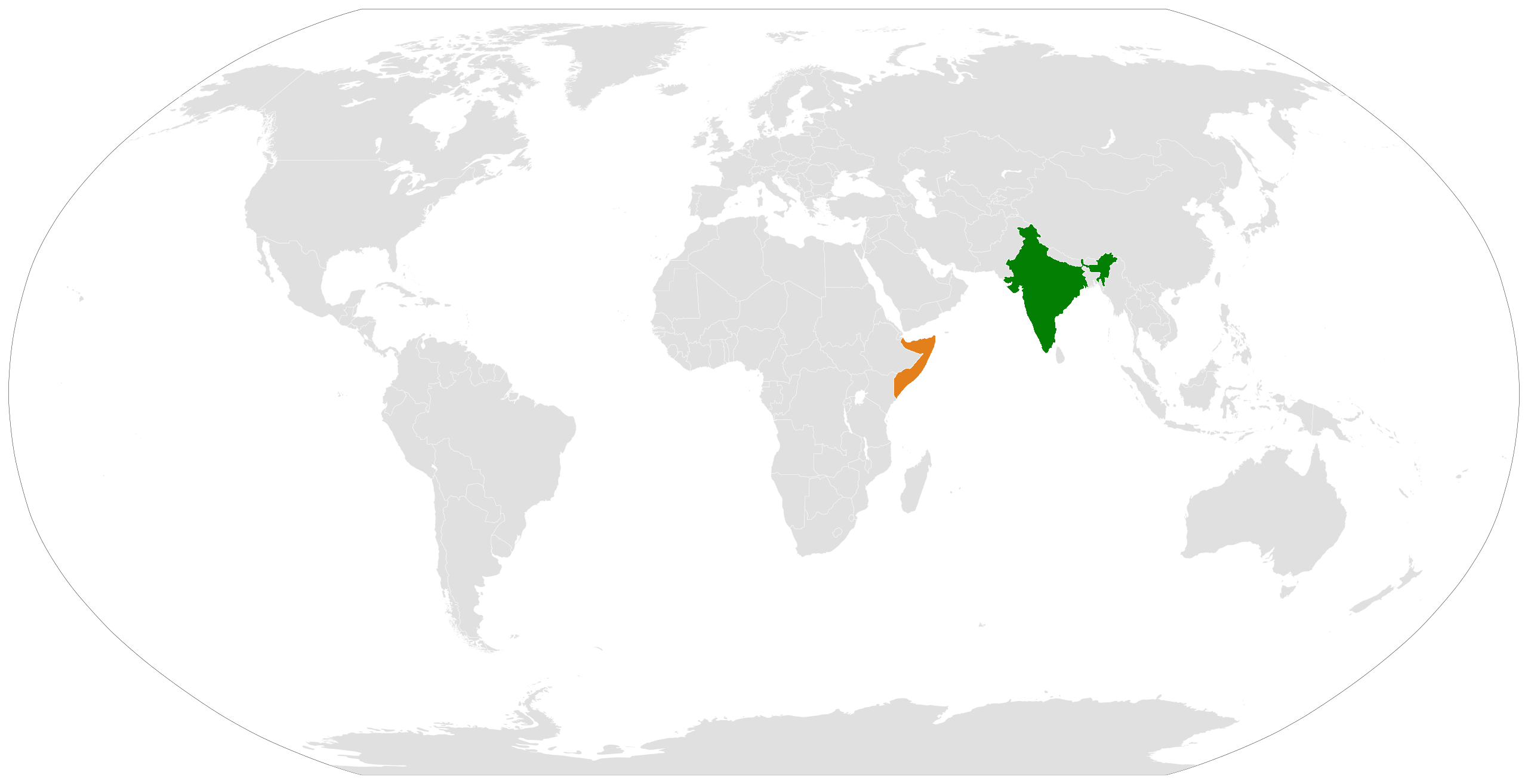
- India: Somalia

India–Somalia relations refers to the international relations that exist between India and Somalia.

== History ==
India opened its embassy in Mogadishu in 1961. The embassy was closed following the outbreak of the Somali Civil War in 1991. The High Commission of India in Nairobi, Kenya is jointly accredited to Somalia. Somalia maintains an embassy in New Delhi.

Somali Prime Minister Abdirashid Ali Shermarke visited India in 1963. He visited the country again as president in 1968. President Hassan Sheikh Mohamud visited New Delhi to attend the 3rd India Africa Forum Summit in October 2015. Mohamud was conferred an Honorary Doctorate degree by Barkatullah University during the visit. Several other high level Somali officials have also visited the country. From India, the highest level visits to Somalia have been at the level of minister of state.

While a non-permanent member of the UNSC in 2011–12, India served as the chair of the UNSC's Somalia-Eritrea Sanctions Committee.

In November 2026, India and Somalia held their inaugural round of Foreign Office Consultations in Mogadishu, a day after signing a memorandum of understanding on consultations between the two foreign ministries. The Indian delegation was led by Suresh Kumar M, Joint Secretary (West Asia and North Africa) in the Ministry of External Affairs, and the Somali side by Hamza Adan Haadoow, Permanent Secretary in Somalia's foreign ministry.

== Trade ==
Trade between India and the Horn of Africa dates back to ancient times.

Bilateral trade between India and Somalia totaled US$391.05 million in 2014–15, recording a growth of 51% over the previous fiscal. India exported $352.81 million worth of goods to Somalia, and imported. $38.25 million.

Since 2008, India provides Somalia unilateral duty-free tariff preferential market access for export of goods and services.

== Foreign aid ==
India provided $ worth of medicines and clothing to Somalia in 1961, and ₹20 lakh (equivalent to ₹1.7 crore or US$180,000 in 2026) of relief supplies in 1992. India donated 100,000 tonnes of wheat to Somalia, Kenya, and Djibouti in 1985.

The Pan African e-Network project, India's flagship aid initiative in Africa, was inaugurated on 16 August 2010 in Somalia. India donated $2 million to the African Union Mission for Somalia (AMISOM) in May 2011, and an additional $1 million in March 2012. In September 2011, India provided $8 million to Somalia, Kenya and Djibouti through the WFP.

Citizens of Somalia are eligible for scholarships under the Indian Technical and Economic Cooperation Programme and the Indian Council for Cultural Relations.

== Anti-piracy operations ==
India is a member of the UN Contact Group on Piracy off the coast of Somalia. Since 2008, the Indian Navy has been conducting anti-piracy patrols in the Gulf of Aden. For the first time, the government authorised the Navy to act autonomously without requesting permission from New Delhi to carry out individual operations.

A pirate "mother ship" fired upon an Indian warship on 26 November 2008, but was sunk after the warship returned fire. Around the same period, INS Tabar prevented the attempted hijacking of an Indian cargo ship off the coast of Somalia. Tabar was dispatched by the Navy in October 2008 to escort vessels off the coast of Somalia. The ship escorted over 35 Indian and foreign-owned ships by the end of November 2008.

Following a meeting between Indian Prime Minister Narendra Modi and Somali President Hassan Sheikh Mohamud in October 2015, the two countries agreed to enhance their co-operation in maritime security and anti-piracy operations.

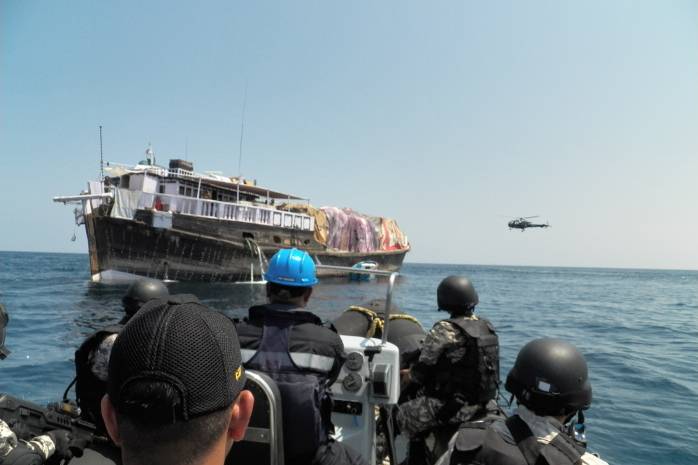
Indian Navy personnel prepare to board the Al Kausar on 13 April 2017.

An Indian-flagged cargo vessel called MV Al Kausar was hijacked by Somali pirates off the island of Socotra on 1 April 2017. The vessel was a dhow carrying wheat and sugar, and sailing from Dubai to Bosasso in Puntland, Somalia with 11 crew members on board. All crew members were Indian citizens. The pirates took the dhow onshore into the central Galmudug state of Somalia. Somali security forces raided the dhow which led to the pirates fleeing to the hilly areas between El-Hur and Hardheere with nine crew members as hostages. Somali forces rescued the dhow, its cargo and the two crew members who had been abandoned by the pirates amidst the clashes. A subsequent raid by Somali forces freed the remaining nine crew members, and all 10 pirates were captured. The pirates had planned to use the Indian hostages to demand the release of pirates being held in Indian prisons. The Indian Navy took possession of the dhow and its crew members on 13 April 2017. After conducting medical checks on crew members and re-supplying the vessel, a Navy ship escorted the Al Kausar to its scheduled destination.

== Somalis in India ==
After the outbreak of the Somali Civil War in 1991, some Somalis sought asylum in India. This refugee community comprises the bulk of Somali immigrants in the country. As of 2007, there are an estimated 600 Somalis in India, 80-90% of whom are concentrated in the city of Hyderabad. Other cities with sizeable populations include Pune, New Delhi, Mumbai, Mysuru and Aurangabad.

Somalis often visit India to study in the country or to seek medical attention. Somali President Hassan Sheikh Mohamud studied in India in the 1980s.

== Indians in Somalia ==
Indian traders have engaged in trade with Somalis since ancient times. Arab traveller Ibn Battuta recorded the presence of Indian traders in the Horn of Africa as far back as 1331, writing that the traders lived with their families in one or two storey buildings. By the 19th centuries, Indian traders in Somalia began exporting export livestock, meat, skins and agricultural products from southern Somalia.

Italian plantation owners hired Indians to work on plantations in Somalia (mainly around Qoryoley) in the 1940s and 50s. Indians also established several businesses in the country. An estimated 200 Indian families resided in Somalia, primarily involved in cloth dying Mogadishu and Merka. The Indian community in Somalia primarily resided in cities and had their own schools and facilities. At the time, Somalis were primarily nomads who wandered the countryside. Indian families in Kismayo moved to Mogadishu in the early 1980s, and nearly the entire Indian community in Somalia left the country after the Somali Civil War began in 1991. Most of the Indians in Somalia relocated to Mombasa, Kenya. Following the civil war, all Indian-owned properties in Somalia were seized by armed militia.

=== Peacekeepers ===
Around 4,600 Indian troops participated in UNOSOM II in 1993–94. The Indian contingent of UNOSOM II, led by Brigadier M P Bhagat, included armour, helicopters and the Indian Navy, and was based in Baidoa. Twelve Indian soldiers were killed in operations in Somalia. Apart from peacekeeping operations, Indian troops also carried out humanitarian activities and reconstruction. Indian troops distributed medicines and seeds worth ₹10 lakh (equivalent to ₹79 lakh or US$84,000 in 2026).
