= India–Niger relations =

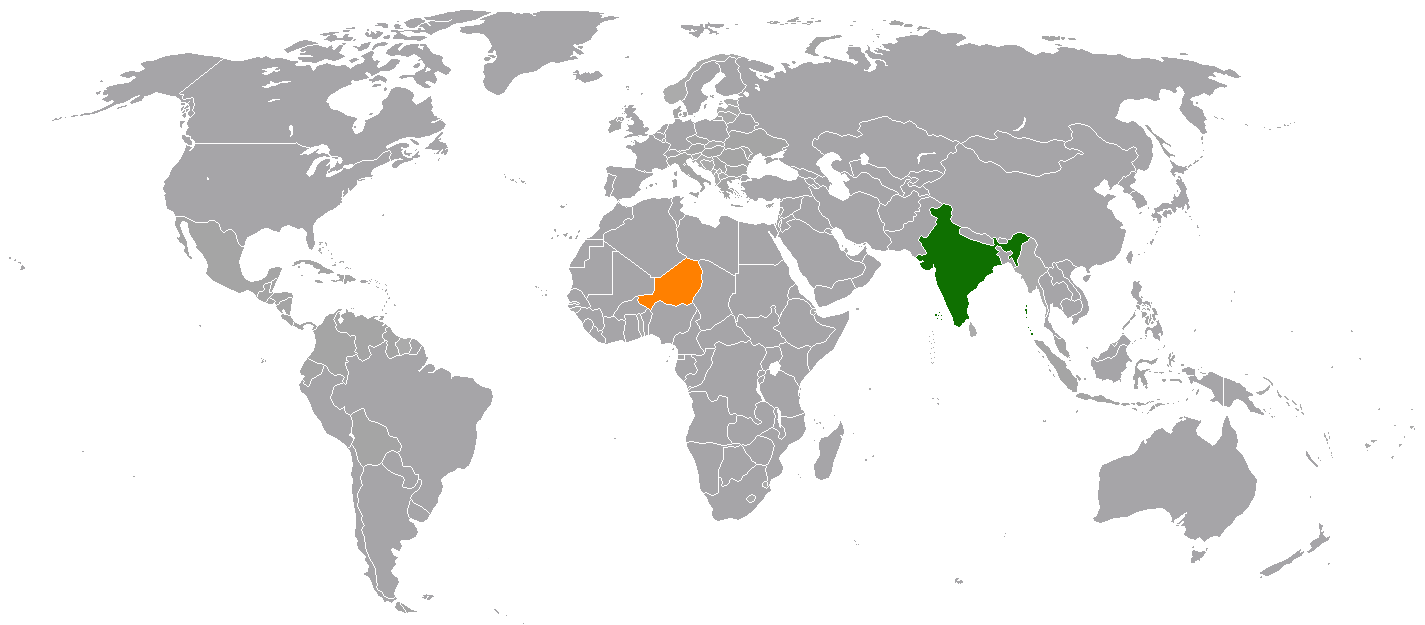
- India: Niger

India–Niger relations refers to the international relations that exist between India and Niger.

== History ==
Niger condemned China and supported India during the Sino-Indian War in 1962.

India opened its embassy in Niamey in May 2009, and the first resident Indian Ambassador to Niger assumed office in August 2010. Niger opened its embassy in New Delhi in November 2011, and the first resident Ambassador of Niger to India assumed office in January 2012.

Nigerien President Mahamadou Issoufou, and a delegation of 6 ministers, visited India from 27 to 30 October 2015. Issoufou met Indian Prime Minister Narendra Modi on 28 October, and expressed his desire to expand relations between the two nations. No Indian Prime Minister or President has visited Niger, but several Cabinet ministers have visited the country.

== Economic relations ==
Bilateral trade between India and Niger totaled US$80.48 million in 2015–16, with the balance of trade overwhelming in India's favour. Indian exports to Niger totaled $80.16 million while imports accounted for just $320,000. The main commodities exported from India to Niger are cereals and other edible items, pharmaceuticals, cotton, electrical machinery and equipment, and plastics. India's primary imports from Niger are raw hides and skins, and lead.

Bilateral trade figures do not reflect the total trade between the two countries, as several Nigerien businessmen purchase Indian goods and products from Dubai.

== Indian foreign aid ==
India provides economic assistance to Niger in healthcare and agriculture, as well as technical assistance and food aid. In September 2005, India supplied free medicines to Niger. It also provided the Niger government with 100 computers and 100 printers in 2012 in a capacity building effort. The Indian government has also supplied television cameras and laptops to Niger's television and radio broadcasting industry.

India has also extended several lines of credit to Niger. In July 2005, India provided $17 million for the procurement of buses, trucks, tractors, flour mills and motor pumps. In July 2008, another LOC worth $20 million was provided to develop power supply and electrification in Niger. Another two LOCs worth $34.50 million were provided in June 2013 for the solar electrification of 50 villages in Niger, and the establishment of a solar power plant. In January 2014, India extended an LOC of $25 million to construct drinking water supply facilities for semi-urban and rural communities. An LOC of $30 million was provided in 2016 for urban solid waste management in Niamey.

Niger is a part of India's Pan-African e-Network project.

Citizens of Niger are eligible for scholarships under the Indian Technical and Economic Cooperation Programme and the Indian Council for Cultural Relations.

== Indians in Niger ==
As of December 2016, 150 Indian citizens reside in Niger, most of whom are engaged in trading and the hospitality sector.
