= Comoros–India relations =

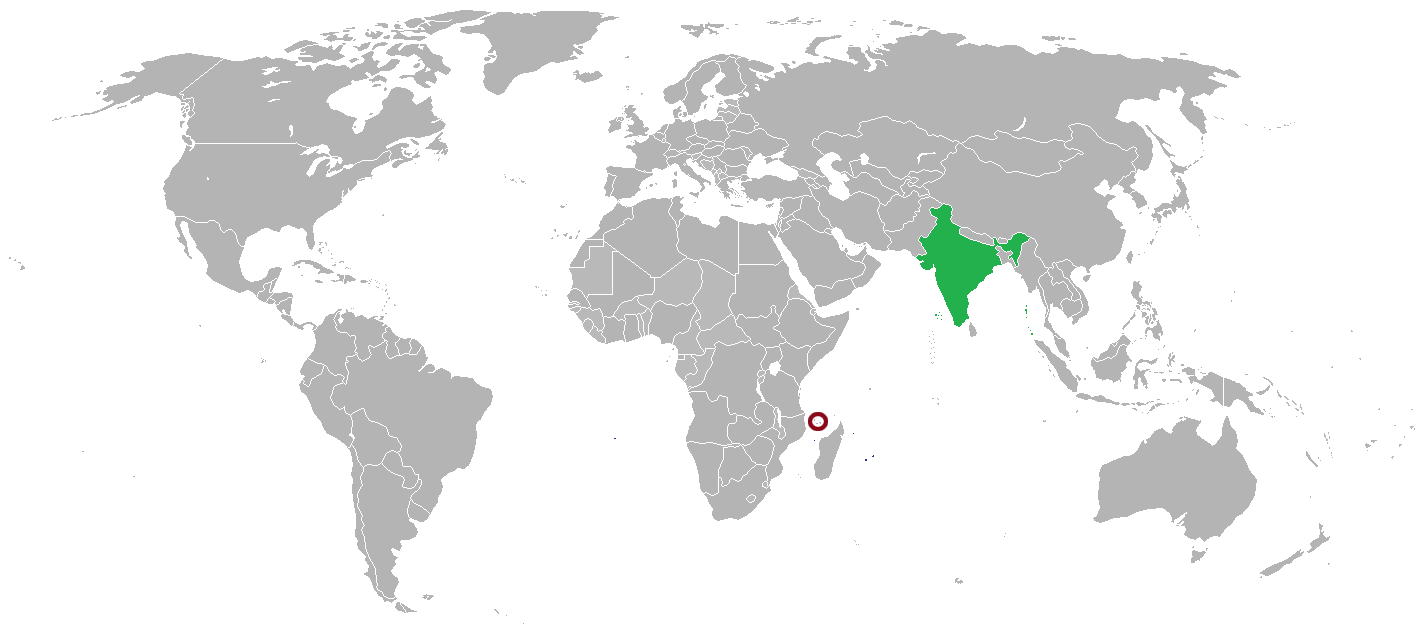

- India: Comoros

Comoros–India relations are the international relations that exist between Comoros and India. The Embassy of India in Antananarivo, Madagascar is concurrently accredited to Comoros. India also maintains an Honorary Consulate General in Moroni. Comoros maintains an Honorary Consulate in New Delhi.

== History ==
Comoros and India established diplomatic relations in June 1976, about a year after the former declared its independence. Comoros became the 20th member of the Indian Ocean Rim Association (IORA), of which India was a founding member, at an IORA meeting in Gurgaon on 2 November 2012.

Several high level diplomatic visits between the countries have taken place. Comorian Minister of External Relations & Cooperation Souef Mohamed El-Amine visited India in August 2004, becoming the first Comorian minister to visit the country. President Ahmed Abdullah Mohamed Sambi visited India in November 2007. President Ikililou Dhoinine visited India to attend the third India-Africa Forum Summit in New Delhi in October 2015. He held bilateral talks with Prime Minister Narendra Modi on 29 October. Modi invited Comoros to join the International Solar Alliance.

From India, the highest level visit to Comoros has been at the level of minister of state. Gurjit Singh, Additional Secretary (Africa) in the Ministry of External Affairs, visited Comoros in May 2011 and was the first Indian government official to visit the country. During the visit, India offered to provide Comoros with a soft loan of US$35 million for any development projects chosen by the Comoros Government. Minister of State for Science and Technology Y.S. Chowdary visited Comoros in August 2015 as the Prime Minister's Special Envoy and met with President Dhoinine.

Comoros supports India's candidature for a permanent seat in the UN Security Council.

== Trade ==
India was the third largest destination for exports from Comoros in 2015. Bilateral trade between Comoros and India totaled US$29.06 million in 2014–15, growing from $20.29 million in the previous fiscal. India exported $17.76 million worth of goods to Comoros, and imported $11.30 million in 2014–15. The main commodities exported by India to Comoros are meat and meat products, textiles and clothing, cereals, and engineering goods. The major commodities imported by India from Comoros are spices, and iron and steel waste.

Indian businessmen visited Comoros in February 2011 and signed contracts to import spices such as cloves, pepper, white pepper, and nutmeg from the country. The first spice exports from Comoros to India commenced in August-September 2011.

Comoros imports medicines from Mauritius, the majority of which are Indian-made.

== Foreign aid ==
Comoros and India signed an agreement to implement the Pan African e-Network Project in 2006. The project began operating in Comoros in September 2010. In 2008, India granted Comoros an exemption from a ban on export of 25,000 tonnes of non-basmati rice to help relieve a food crisis in the country. India donated $100,000 to Comoros to help deal with the aftermath of torrential rains in April 2012. The Government of Comoros signed an agreement with the EXIM Bank of India on 22 February 2013 to avail a concessional line of credit worth $41.6 million to establish a power plant in Moroni. A consortium of Indian firms Overseas Infrastructure Alliance (OIA) and Bharat Heavy Electricals Ltd. was awarded the contract to build the plant. The 18 MW power plant was officially inaugurated on 18 July 2015.

The Government of India has offered to establish a vocational training centre (VTC) in Mitsamiouili, Moroni to provide Comorians with training in plumbing, welding, electricity, civil works, IT and other skills.

To help with capacity building and skill development in Comoros, the Government of India offers numerous scholarship programmes for Comorians. These include the CV Raman Research Fellowships Scheme, and the Indian Technical and Economic Cooperation Programme, the Indian Council for Cultural Relations, and India Africa Forum Summit scholarships. Comorian diplomats have attended training courses at the Foreign Service Institute.

== Indians in Comoros ==
As of January 2016, about 250 Indians reside in Comoros. Most of the community is involved in trade and business.
