= Eswatini–India relations =

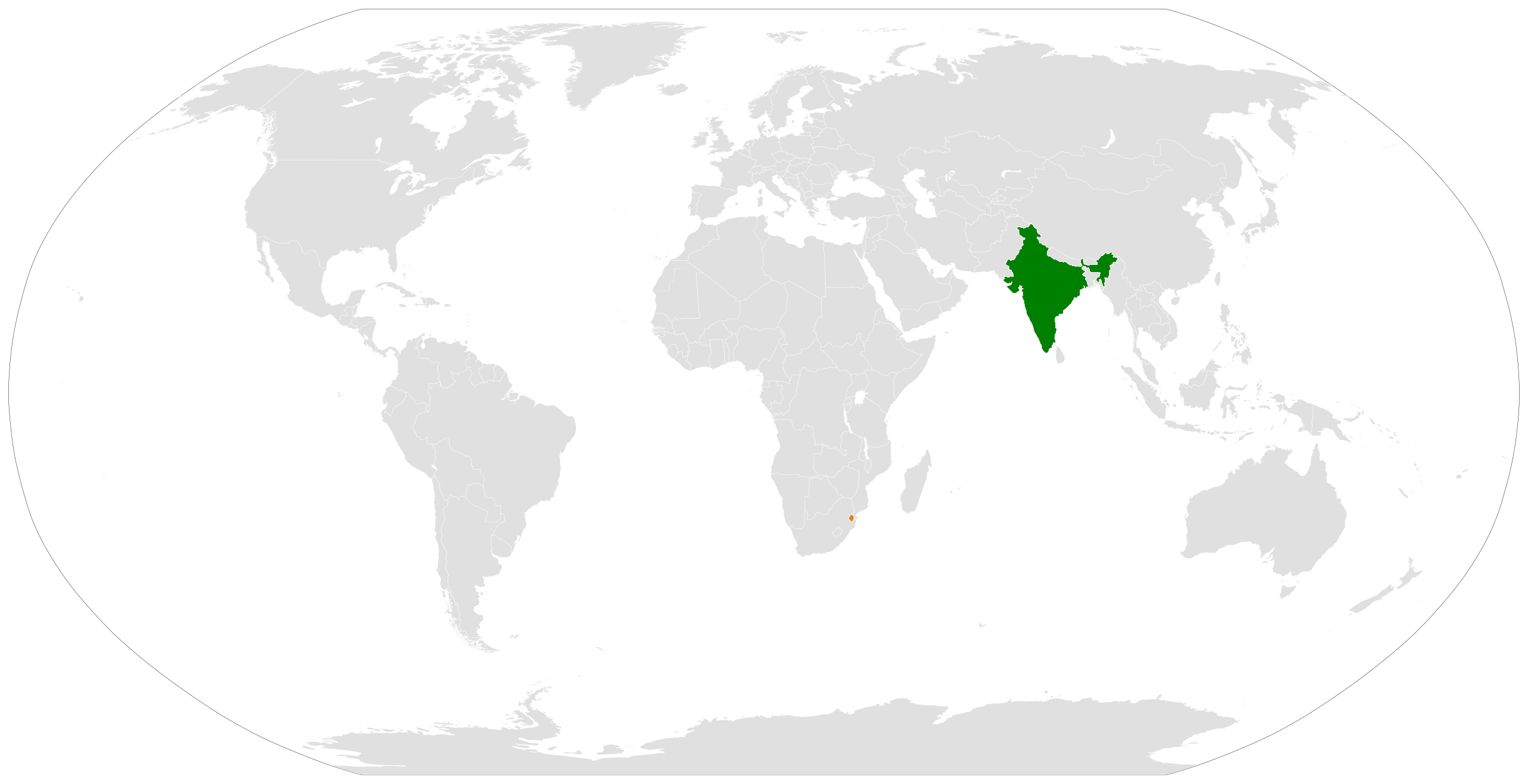
- India: Eswatini

Eswatini–India relations refers to the international relations that exist between Eswatini and India. India also maintains a resident High Commission in Mbabane established on 13 August, 2019. Eswatini does not have a diplomatic mission in India.

== History ==
The majority of the diplomatic visits between the two countries have been visits by Swazi officials, often to attend the annual CII-EXIM Bank Africa Conclaves and other multilateral events. From India, the highest level visits to Eswatini have been at the level of minister of state. The Minister of State for External Affairs Preneet Kaur and the Minister of State for Culture, Tourism and Civil Aviation visited Eswatini in May 2011 and July 2015 respectively. Both ministers met with King Mswati III.

King Mswati III met with Prime Minister Manmohan Singh during the second India–Africa Forum Summit in Addis Ababa, Ethiopia in May 2011. He made the first ever visit by a Swazi King to India in October–November 2015 to attend the third India Africa Forum Summit in New Delhi. Mswati met with the then President Pranab Mukherjee on 27 October, and with Prime Minister Narendra Modi on the following day. Apart from other government officials, the King was accompanied by 15 wives, 30 children and 100 servants. Mswati made his second visit to India in March 2017, accompanied by a 70-member delegation including ministers of foreign affairs, trade, economic planning, health and agriculture. Unlike the previous visit, the King brought only one of his wives and one child. The Indian Express described the move as a sign that the trip was "strictly business". Mswati met with Prime Minister Modi and President Mukherjee, was the guest of honour at the CII-EXIM Bank Conclave, and also participated in Holi festivities. He also visited Anand, Gujarat to learn about animal husbandry and dairy farming practices, as well as Rajasthan and Gurgaon. Mswati sought India's assistance to establish a science park and renewable energy infrastructure in Eswatini. Following his return to Eswatini, Mswati stated that Eswatini would benefit from the SZL 131 billion financial assistance that India had pledged to African countries at the CII-EXIM Bank Conclave.

India voted against Eswatini's proposal to legalise the international sale of white rhino horns at the 17th Conference of the Parties (CoP 17) of the Convention on International Trade in Endangered Species of Wild Fauna and Flora (CITES) held in Johannesburg, South Africa in October 2016. The proposal was defeated with 100 countries voting against, 26 in favour and 17 abstained.

Eswatini supports India's candidature for a permanent seat in the UN Security Council.

== Trade ==
Bilateral trade between India and Eswatini totaled US$61.97 million in 2014–15, declining by 58% from the previous fiscal year. India exported $39.94 million worth of goods to Eswatini, and imported $22.03 million. While India's exports to Eswatini grew by 76.49% from 2013–14 to 2014–15, its imports from the country declined by 82.35% during the same period. The main commodities exported by India to Eswatini are pharmaceutical products, gold and precious metal jewellery, pearl/semi-precious stones, industrial machinery, fertilizers, Shellac, organic chemicals, aluminum products and electric machinery and equipment. The major commodities imported by India from Eswatini are industrial machinery, gold, residual chemical, medical and scientific instruments, pharmaceuticals, organic chemicals, electrical machinery, electronic instruments, pearls and semi-precious stones.

== Foreign aid ==
India has extended two lines of credit to Eswatini - $20 million to establish an information technology park, and $37.9 million for an agriculture development and mechanization project.

Citizens of Eswatini are eligible for Indian Technical and Economic Cooperation Programme and Indian Council for Cultural Relations scholarships for undergraduate, postgraduate and doctoral studies in India.

== Indians in Eswatini ==
As of December 2016, there are around 800 Indians in Eswatini, of whom about 300 are Indian citizens and 500 are people of Indian origin that have acquired Swazi citizenship. The Indian community is primarily involved in business. Some Indians also work in Swazi Government departments and hospitals, and a few are professors teaching at the University of Eswatini.

== See also ==
- Indian High Commission in Mbabane, Eswatini
