= Guinea–India relations =

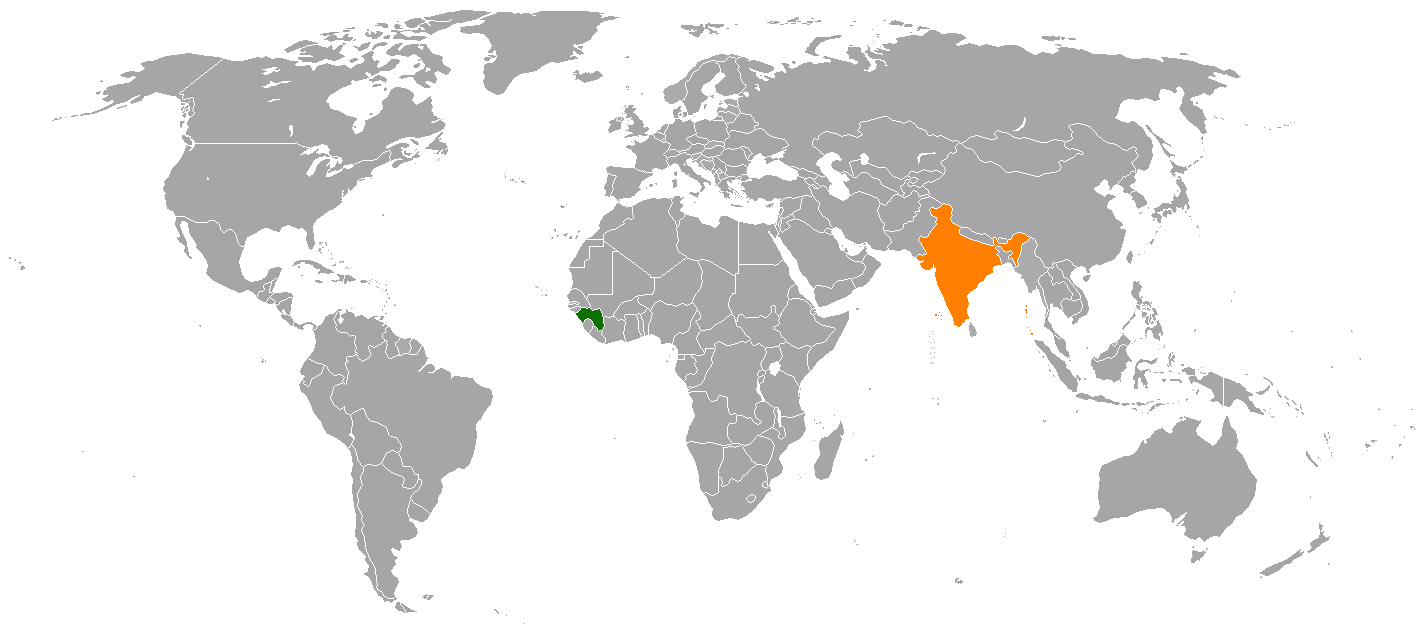
- Guinea: India

Guinea–India relations are the bilateral relations between Guinea and India. India maintained an embassy in Conakry, but shut it down after more than 2 decades of operation in 1988. Subsequently, the Embassy of India in Abidjan, Côte d'Ivoire was jointly accredited to Guinea. Guinea opened its embassy in New Delhi in April 2012. India has maintained an honorary consul in Guinea since 1989.

== High level visits ==
Guinean President Ahmed Sekou Toure made a four-day visit to India in March 1981, and held talks with Prime Minister Indira Gandhi. He visited the country again in March 1983 to attend the NAM Summit in Delhi. There have been regular visits to India by Guinean Ministers. Indian Minister of State for External Affairs Preneet Kaur visited Guinea in January 2014. This was the first ministerial visit since the closure of Indian Embassy in Conakry in 1988. Kaur held bilateral talks with President, Prime Minister, and Foreign Minister. During the visit, the two countries signed an agreement to establish a Joint Commission between the Foreign Ministries of two countries, and an MoU to hold regular Foreign Office Consultations.

== Relations ==
Guinea and India were among the first 19 countries to join the International Solar Alliance, proposed by Prime Minister Narendra Modi, on 15 November 2016.

== Trade ==
India was the second largest destination for exports from, and second largest source for imports to Guinea in 2015. Bilateral trade between Guinea and India totaled US$1,013.50 million in 2014–15, rising sharply by 154.76% over the previous fiscal. Although bilateral trade has grown since 2010, it fluctuates greatly every year and observes no clear trend. India exported $283.81 million worth of goods to Guinea, and imported $729.69 million in 2014–15. The main commodities exported by India to Guinea are cereals, rice, drugs and pharmaceuticals, textiles, transport equipment, paints, chemicals, iron, steel, and construction equipment. The major commodities imported by India from Guinea are pearls, stones, jewellery, mineral fuels and bitumen, cashew, scrap metals, and aluminum.

Topaz Group of Companies operates paint and plastic goods manufacturing units, and Bombay Store operates a soap manufacturing facility in Guinea. The Indo-Gulf Hospital, Noida established a 300-bed hospital in Conakry.

== Foreign aid ==
India donated 50 electric transformers with capacities between 250 and 400 KVA to Guinea in April 2007. The transformers cost ₹17.67 million (US$180,000) and are intended to help deal with the country's electricity shortage. India also donated 175 computers to the Government of Guinea. The Indo-Gulf Hospital, Noida donated medicines and other supplies worth ₹30 lakhs to provide relief during the outbreak of ebola in Guinea. Indian firm Tata Steel donated 10 buses to the Government of Guinea in 2013.

The Pan African e-Network project, India's flagship aid initiative in Africa, has been implemented in Guinea. At the second India Africa Forum Summit in Addis Ababa in 2011, India agreed to set up a bio-mass gassifier for rural electrification in Guinea.

India provided Guinea with a Line of Credit (LOC) worth $35 million to improve its health system in March 2014, and another $59.87 million LOC to modernize and develop the agricultural sector. Guinea was extended a LOC of $28.51 million through ECOWAS Bank for Investment and Development (EBID) to import 100 buses from India (worth $8.1 million) and to upgrade and expand the electricity network in the country (US$20 million).

India donated $50,000 directly to Guinea to help fight ebola, and an additional $2 million was donated to 3 ebola affected West African countries (including Guinea) to purchase protective gear to fight ebola. India further donated $500,000 through WHO, and $10 million through the UN Fund for Ebola.

Citizens of Guinea are eligible for scholarships under the Indian Technical and Economic Cooperation Programme and the Indian Council for Cultural Relations.

== Indians in Guinea ==
As of July 2015, around 700 Indians resided in Guinea. They are primarily engaged in trading or are employed by trading companies. Some members of the community have founded manufacturing, trading, mining and agricultural businesses. Conakry has one Gurudwara cum Hindu temple utilized by all members of the Indian community for religious functions and gatherings.

== See also ==
- Foreign relations of Guinea
- Foreign relations of India
