= Democratic Republic of the Congo–India relations =

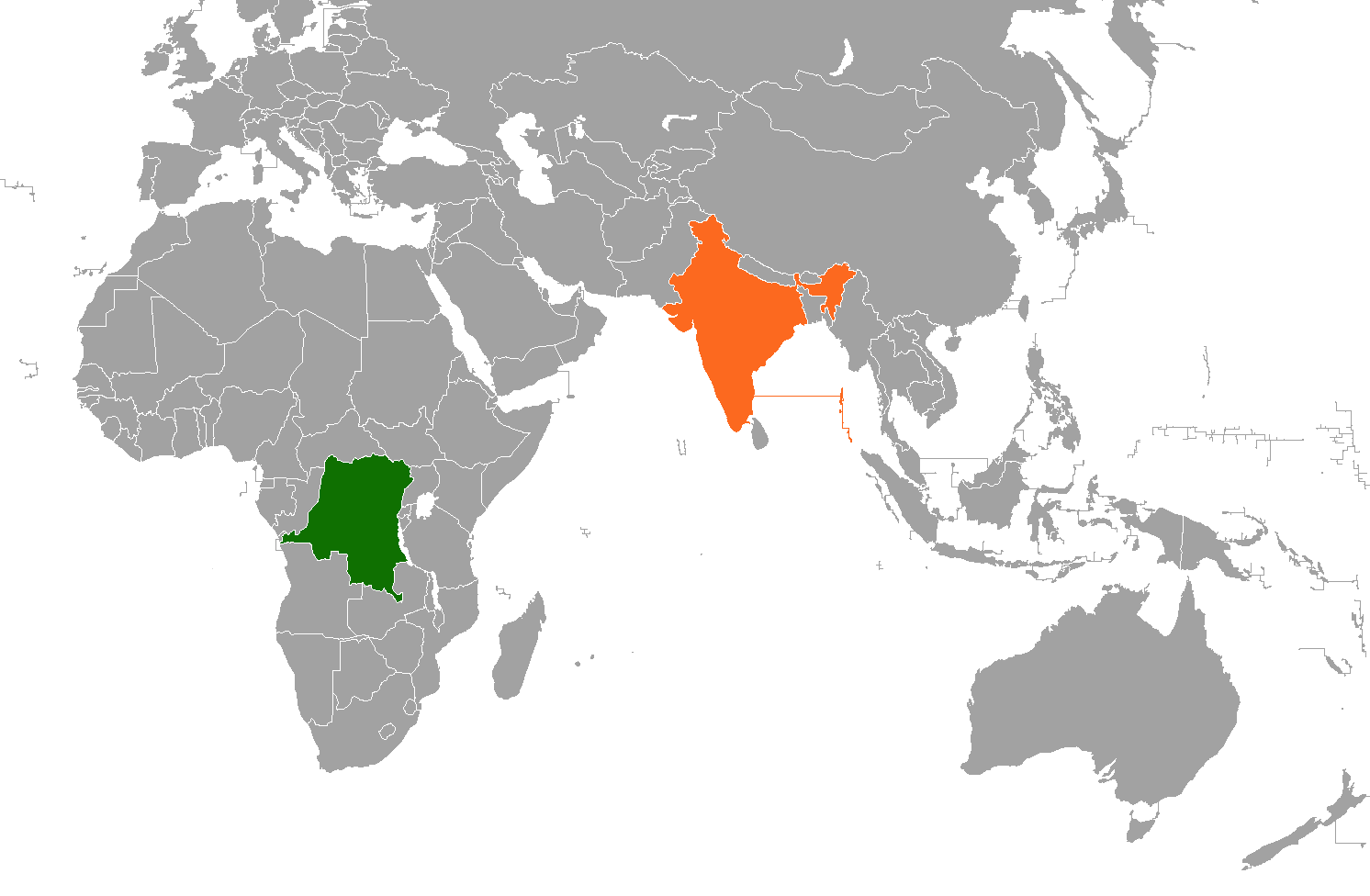
- DR Congo: India

Democratic Republic of the Congo–India relations are the international relations that exist between the Democratic Republic of the Congo (DRC) and India.

== History ==
India opened its embassy in Kinshasa in 1962, one of the first countries to establish a diplomatic mission in the country.

DRC President Joseph Kabila Kabange visited India to attend the First India-Africa Forum Summit on 8-9 April 2008. He also held a bilateral meeting with bilateral talks with Prime Minister Manmohan Singh.

== Economic relations ==
Bilateral trade between the DRC and India totaled US$ 415.39 million in 2015-16. The major commodities imported by India from the DRC are mineral fuel, mineral oils, copper, natural or cultured pearls, precious or semi-precious stones, oil seeds and olea, and miscellaneous grains. The major commodities India exports to the DRC are pharmaceutical products, vehicles, electrical machinery and equipment, nuclear reactors and boilers, and iron and steel products.

The Indian government has offered to help Congo develop its mining industry.

== Indian peacekeepers ==
India's Gurkha troops served under the ONUC UN peacekeeping mission in the DRC during 1960–62, aimed at quelling a rebellion in the Katanga province. As of December 2016, around 4,500 Indian troops, military observers and police personnel are deployed in the country as part of MONUSCO.

== Indian foreign aid ==
Citizens of the DRC are eligible for scholarships under the Indian Technical and Economic Cooperation Programme and the Indian Council for Cultural Relations.

== Indians in the DRC ==
The DRC has the largest Indian community of any Central African nation. As of December 2016, there are an estimated 9,000 Indian citizens and persons of Indian (PIO) origin residing in the DRC. Most of the PIOs in the DRC hold British, Canadian, Kenyan and Tanzanian citizenship. The Indian community is primarily employed in services sector, as well as business, trading and manufacturing.

Indian emigrants to the DRC primarily come from the state of Gujarat, with Kerala, and other South Indian states also making up a significant population. A small number of Indians in the DRC are from North India. The single largest Indian community in the DRC is the Ismaili community, estimated to number about 2,000 people. The Congo Hindu Mandal, an Indian community organization, built a Hindu temple in Kinshasa.

== See also ==
- Embassy of India, Kinshasa
