= Nripendra Misra =

Former Principal Secretary to the Prime Minister of India

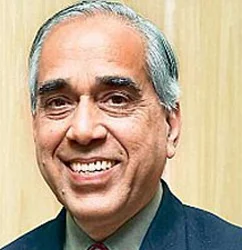

14th Principal Secretary to the Prime Minister of India
- In office 28 May 2014 – 30 August 2019
- Prime Minister: Narendra Modi
- Additional Principal Secretary: Pramod Kumar Misra
- Preceded by: Pulok Chatterjee
- Succeeded by: Pramod Kumar Misra

Chairperson of the Telecom Regulatory Authority of India
- In office 22 March 2006 – 22 March 2009
- Preceded by: Pradip Baijal
- Succeeded by: J. S. Sarma

Telecom Secretary of India
- In office January 2004 – March 2005

Fertilizers Secretary of India
- In office January 2002 – January 2004

Personal details
- Born: 8 March 1945 (age 81) Deoria, United Provinces, British India
- Children: Saket Misra
- Education: (M.A.), (M.P.A), (M.Sc) University of Allahabad (M.P.A) Harvard University

Nripendra Misra (born 8 March 1945) is a retired Indian Administrative Service officer (IAS) of the 1967 batch from the Uttar Pradesh cadre, who served as the Principal Secretary to the Prime Minister of India, Narendra Modi from 2014 to 2019. He previously served as the chairperson of the Telecom Regulatory Authority of India, Telecom Secretary of India and the Fertilizers Secretary of India. He was awarded India's third highest civilian award the Padma Bhushan in 2021.

== Education ==
Misra has an MPA in public administration from John F. Kennedy School of Government at Harvard University, and has postgraduate degrees in chemistry and political science and public administration from the University of Allahabad.

== Career ==
=== As an IAS officer ===
Misra served in various positions for both the Government of India and the Government of Uttar Pradesh as an IAS officer, he served in positions such as Principal Secretary (Home-II), Principal Secretary to Chief Minister of Uttar Pradesh, member of the Uttar Pradesh Board of Revenue, chairperson and chief executive officer of Greater NOIDA, secretary in the now-erstwhile Department of Institutional Finance, Taxation and Excise and as a special secretary in the Department of Finance in the Uttar Pradesh government; and as Union Telecom Secretary and chairperson of Telecom Commission, Union Fertilizers Secretary, additional secretary looking after World Trade Organization affairs in the Ministry of Commerce, and as a joint secretary in Department of Economic Affairs of the Ministry of Finance in the Indian government.

Misra also served as Minister (Economic) in India's embassy to the United States in Washington, D.C. from August 1985 to July 1988. Misra further served as a consultant to the World Bank, the Asian Development Bank, the International Fund for Agricultural Development and the Government of Nepal.

==== Fertilizers Secretary of India ====
Misra was appointed as the Fertilizers Secretary of India by the Appointments Committee of the Cabinet (ACC) in January 2002; Misra assumed the office of secretary in January 2002 and demitted it in January 2004, serving for approximately two years.

==== Telecom Secretary of India ====
Misra was appointed as the Telecom Secretary of and chairperson of Telecom Commission by the Appointments Committee of the Cabinet (ACC) in January 2004; Misra assumed the office of secretary in January 2004 and retired from service in March 2005, serving for more than a year.

=== Post-retirement ===
==== Chairperson of Telecom Regulatory Authority of India ====
After his retirement from the Indian Administrative Service, Misra was appointed as the chairperson of the Telecom Regulatory Authority of India (TRAI) in March 2006, succeeding another retired IAS officer, Pradip Baijal, Misra demitted the office of chairperson of TRAI in March 2009, serving as the regulator's head for three years and was succeeded by J. S. Varma, another IAS officer and former Telecom Secretary in May 2009.

He resigned as member of the Board of Directors of Usha Martin Limited on May 26, 2014 upon being invited to join the PMO under the newly formed Modi government. He is also a former member of the Executive Council at the Vivekananda International Foundation.

==== Principal Secretary to the Prime Minister of India ====
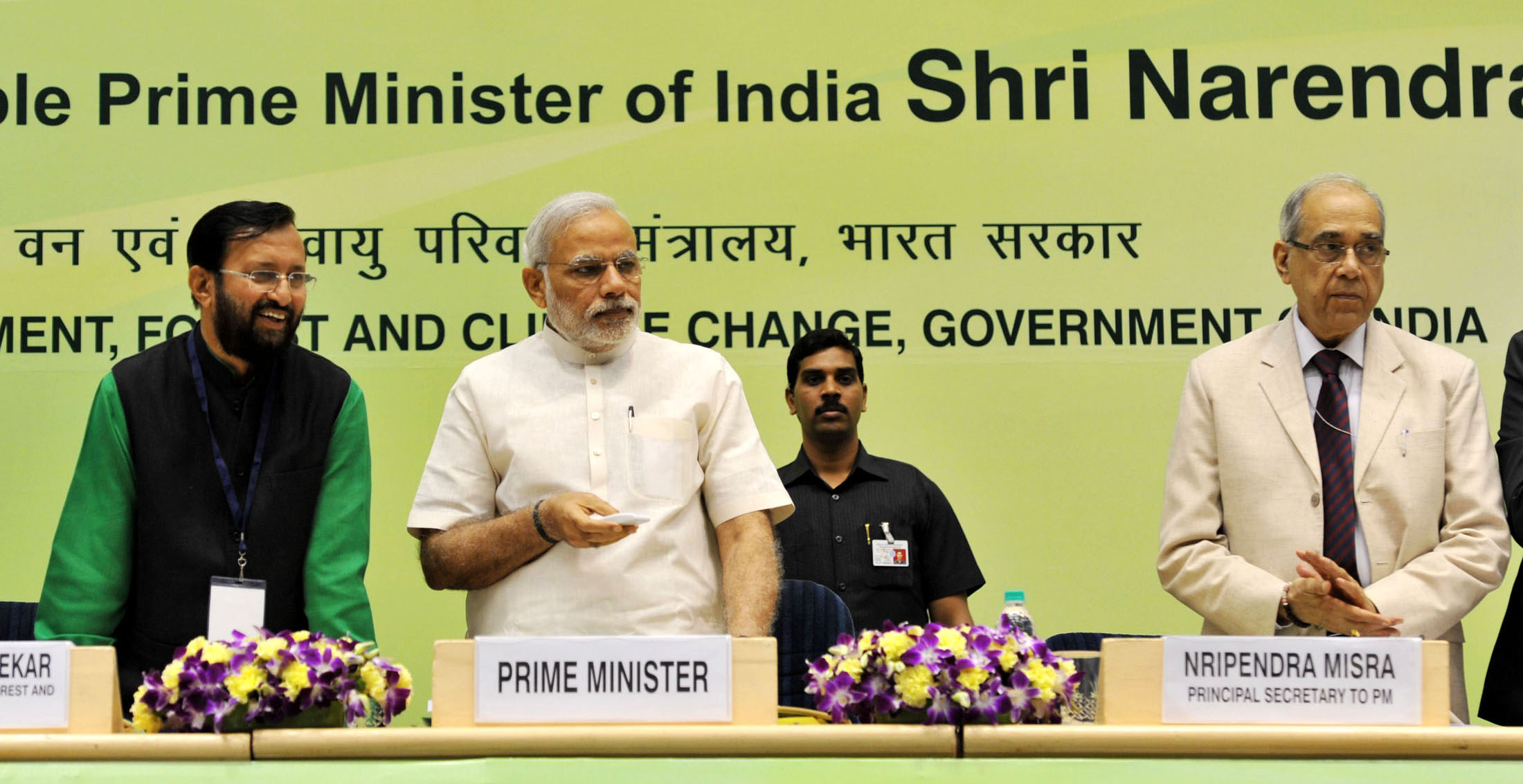
Nripendra Misra with Prime Minister of India, Narendra Modi and Minister of Environment, Forest and Climate Change, Prakash Javadekar in April 2015

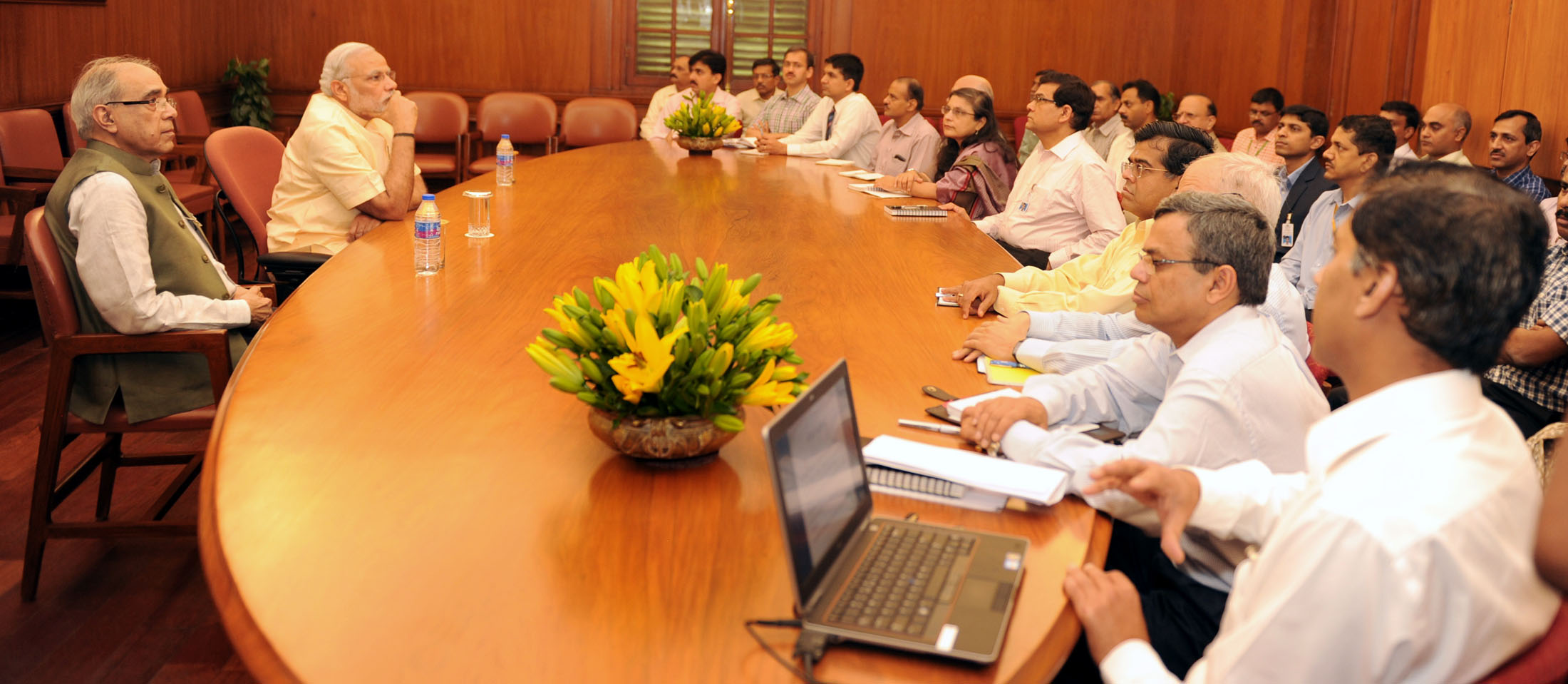
Nripendra Misra with Prime Minister of India, Narendra in New Delhi on May 26, 2015

In May 2014, newly elected prime minister, Narendra Modi, appointed Misra as his principal secretary, through the Appointments Committee of the Cabinet (ACC) and was given the rank and status of Cabinet Minister, the Government of India. To confirm Misra's appointment, the Telecom Regulatory Authority of India Act, 1997 had to be amended, first by a temporary ordinance, and then by an Act, as one of its provisions barred a former TRAI chairperson from holding any office in the Government of India or any state or union territorial government.

During his tenure as principal secretary, Misra has been considered to be one of the most powerful bureaucrats in India.

On June 11, 2019, Misra was re-appointed as Principal Secretary to Prime Minister Narendra Modi. The Appointments Committee of the Cabinet approved his appointment along with re-appointment of Additional Principal Secretary Pramod Kumar Misra with effect from May 31, 2019. These appointments were designated to be co-terminous with the term of the Prime Minister.

On 30 August, Misra quit his position as principal secretary at the PMO, though he confirmed he would continue for a couple of weeks at the request of the Prime Minister.

==== Chairperson of NMML ====
Post his resignation as principal secretary, Mishra was appointed the chairperson of the executive council of the Nehru Memorial Museum and Library in January 2020.

==== Chairman of Shri Ram Janmabhoomi Teerth Kshetra ====
Nripendra Misra was elected as the chairman of the temple construction committee of the Shri Ram Janmabhoomi Teerth Kshetra Trust in February 2020. The move was seen as part of government strategy to keep a close engagement with the ambitious Ram Mandir project.

== Honours ==
- Order of the Rising Sun, 2nd Class, Gold and Silver Star: 2021
