= India–Rwanda relations =

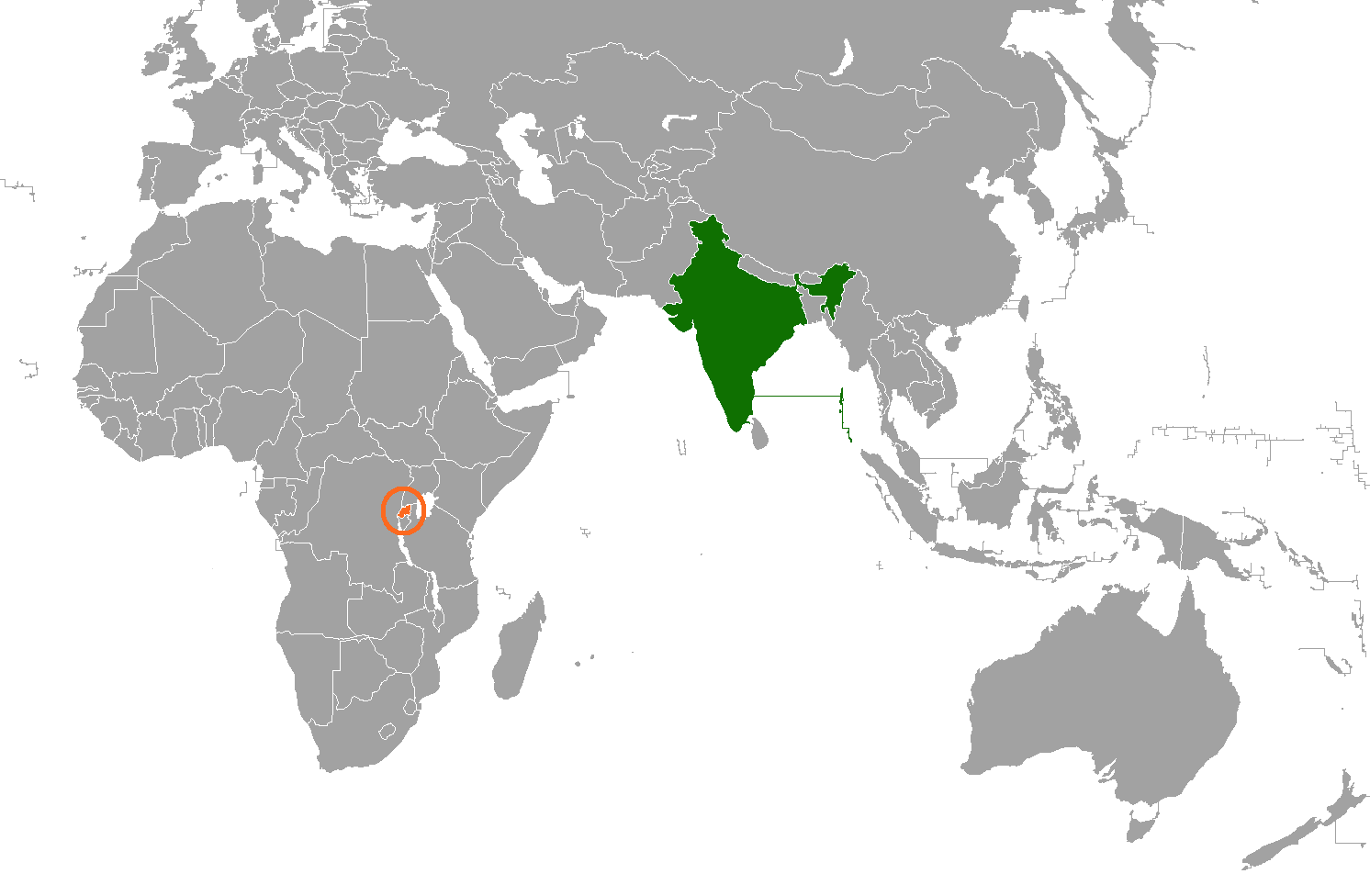
- India: Rwanda

Diplomatic mission
- High Commission of India, Kigali: High Commission of Rwanda, New Delhi

Envoy
- High Commissioner Oscar Kerketta: High Commissioner Jacqueline Mukangira

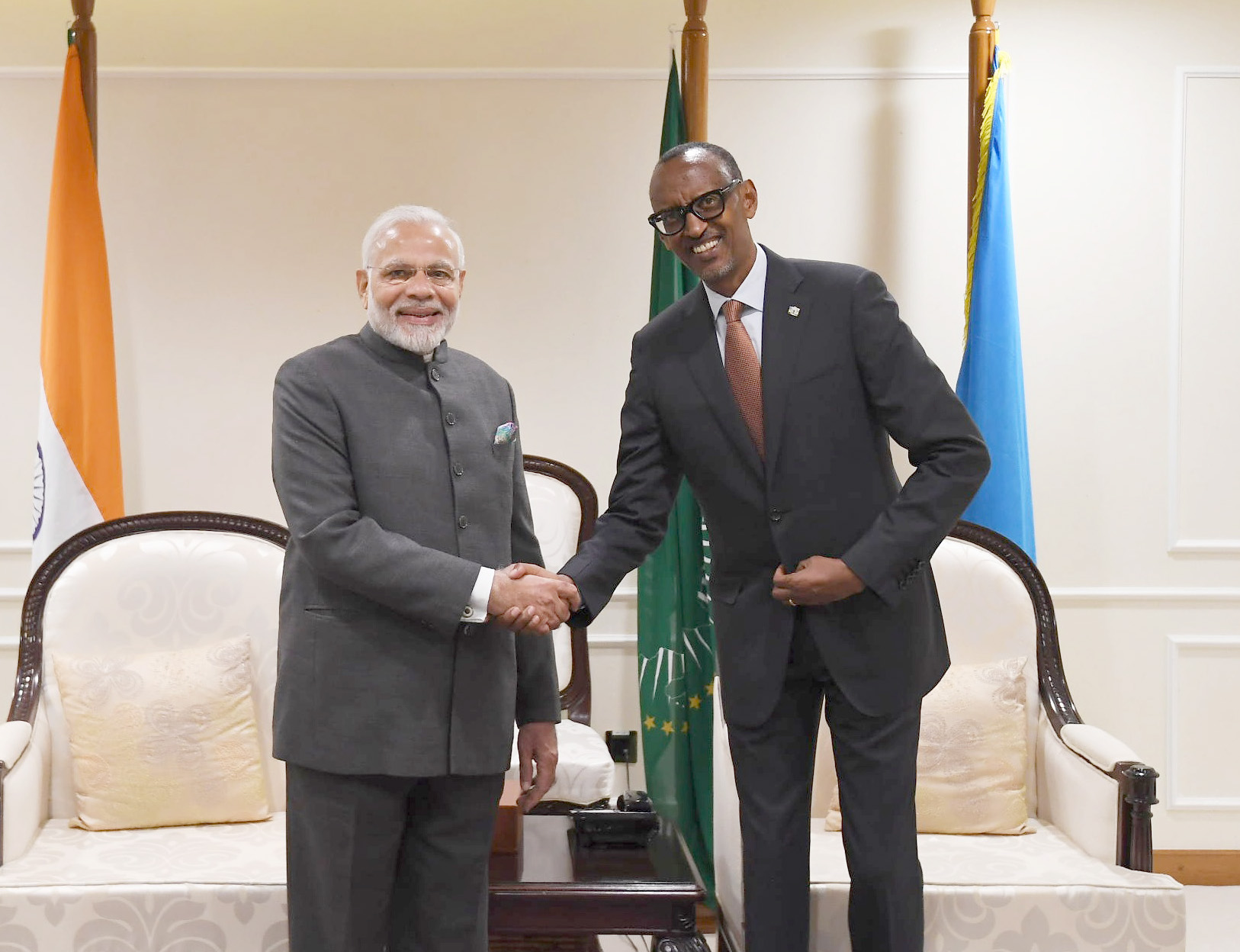
Prime Minister Narendra Modi meeting with President Paul Kagame in Kigali; July 2018.

India–Rwanda relations are the foreign relations between the Republic of India and the Republic of Rwanda. India is represented in Rwanda through its High Commission in Kigali which opened on 15 August 2018. Rwanda has been operating its High Commission in New Delhi since 1999 and appointed its first resident High Commissioner in 2001.

== History ==
Rwanda opened its embassy in New Delhi in 1999 and appointed its first resident ambassador in 2001. Although Rwanda had not been a British colony, it opted to become a member of the Commonwealth of Nations in 2009, and its diplomatic mission became a High Commission. India opened its High Commission in Kigali on 15 August 2018, and appointed Oscar Kerketta as its first resident High Commissioner to Rwanda. The Indian High Commission in Kampala, Uganda had previously been accredited to Rwanda.

== High-level visits ==
Rwandan president Paul Kagame has visited India five times, including three private visits and two state visits. He made his first visit in December 2002 to receive an honorary doctorate from the Vellore Institute of Technology. He made his second visit in January 2009 to participate as the chief guest at the India-Africa Business Forum organised by the Federation of Indian Chambers of Commerce & Industry. Kagame visited New Delhi again in November 2014 to participate in the India Economic Forum, and also met with President Pranab Mukherjee during the visit. Kagame visited Gandhinagar, Gujarat in January 2017 to attend the Vibrant Gujarat summit, and met Prime Minister Narendra Modi on the sidelines of the summit. Kagame visited Delhi on 9-12 March 2018 to participate in the founding conference of the International Solar Alliance.

Rwandan Prime Minister Bernard Makuza participated in the Vibrant Gujarat Summit in January 2011. He visited India again in October 2011 to explore new investment opportunities accompanied by a 25 member business delegation. In April 2012, Defence Minister Gen. James Kaberebe led a three-member delegation to India to attend DefExpo India 2012. He also met with his Indian counterpart and discussed possible future cooperation between the two countries in the field of defence. Speaker of the Parliament of Rwanda Rose Mukantabana attended the 7th Meeting of Women Speakers of Parliament held in New Delhi in October 2012. Prime Minister Anastase Murekezi visited India in October 2015 to attend the 3rd India-Africa Forum Summit.

During Vice-President Mohammad Hamid Ansari's 5-day visit to Rwanda in February 2017, the two countries signed agreements to set up an entrepreneurship development centre in Kigali, begin RwandAir flights to India, and mutually exempt visa requirements for diplomatic and official passport holders. Ansari also met with President Kagame, Prime Minister Anastase Murekezi, and President of the Rwandan Senate Bernard Makuza. Makuza visited India in July 2018, met with Vice-President Venkaiah Naidu and signed an MoU for cooperation between the Senate and the Rajya Sabha.

Narendra Modi became the first Indian Prime Minister to visit Rwanda on 23-24 July 2018. Several bilateral agreements were signed during the visit including MoUs on defence co-operation, dairy co-operation, leather co-operation, cultural exchange, cooperation in agriculture and animal resources, and a bilateral trade agreement. India also extended lines of credit worth US$100 million for the development of industrial parks and expansion of Kigali SEZ, and US$100 million for financing an agriculture project in Rwanda. Modi made several other commitments to assist Rwanda including gifting 100,000 books of the National Council of Educational Research and Training, setting up a task force in the field of digital education and an e-library, support for digitalization and online access of education books and related learning material, establishing an Entrepreneurship Development Centre in Kigali, providing 25 fully funded slots for Rwandans to attend training in dairy production and processing in India, a gift of 200 cows worth US$200,000 to the Rwandan Government's Girinka programme which aims to provide one cow to every poor Rwandan family, and donations of US$20,000 to the Kigali Genocide Memorial and the Imbuto Foundation for the education of girls.

== Economic relations ==
Bilateral trade totaled US$140.96 million in 2020-21. India made $134.29 million worth of exports and $6.67 million worth of imports from Rwanda. The main commodities exported by India to Rwanda are electrical and mechanical machinery, pharmaceuticals and vehicles. The major commodities imported by India from Rwanda are metallic articles (aluminum, lead and copper), precious and semi-precious stones, tea and coffee.

The Rwandan High Commissioner to India stated that in the year 2011 alone, projects by Indian entrepreneurs worth over US$200 million were registered in Rwanda. He further stated that other projects by Indian entrepreneurs valued at over US$1.0 billion are in the pipeline.

Bharti Airtel was awarded a licence to operate mobile services by the Rwanda Utilities Regulatory Agency in September 2011. Airtel Rwanda Limited launched services on 30 March 2012. Airtel announced that it had reached an agreement with competitor Millicom to acquire complete control of Tigo Rwanda at a reported cost of $60-70 million in December 2017. The acquisition made Airtel the second largest mobile operator in Rwanda with a 40% market share. Luxmi Tea, a Kolkata-based company, has investments in Rwanda's tea industry. TVS Motor Company has significant market share in Rwanda's two-wheeler market. Sahasra Lighting is involved in the supply of LED lighting and solar panels in Rwanda. Rwanda's only sugar refinery and its only modern textile mill, and a soap and cosmetic factory are owned by persons of Indian origin (PIO).

Kigali has increasingly been viewed by Indian organizations as a suitable location to host conferences. An Indian think tank, the Observer Research Foundation, organized the Kigali Global Dialogue in July 2019. In August 2019, the Telecom Equipments and Services Export Promotion Council (TEPC) organized the India-Africa ICT Expo2019 in collaboration with the Government of Rwanda in Kigali. The second India-Africa ICT Expo 2020 was conducted virtually (due to the COVID-19 pandemic) with the support of Government of Rwanda in December 2020.

== Development assistance ==
Under the Pan-African e-Network project, tele-medicine and tele-education centres were established in Rwanda in 2009 enabling Rwandan doctors to consult their Indian counterparts, and provide treatment for patients and education for students in Rwanda. India extended LoCs totaling US$120 million for the development of Export Targeted Irrigated Agriculture Project and its expansion in 2013.

At the first India Africa Forum Summit, Rwanda was nominated by the African Union as one of the hosts for the India-Africa Vocational Training Centre. Indian Minister for Micro, Small and Medium Enterprises Kalraj Mishra visited Kigali in January 2015 to inaugurate the institute. At the 2nd India Africa Forum Summit, India announced it would establish the India-Africa Entrepreneurship Development Centre (IAEDC) in Rwanda. An MoU on cooperation in forensic sciences was signed between the Government of Rwanda and the National Forensic Sciences University in January 2017 to train Rwandans in the field of forensic science.

A 28 MW hydroelectric project on the Nyabarongo River was completed and commissioned in early 2016 funded by a US$80 million line of credit (LOC) provided by the Government of India. The project has substantially augmented Rwanda’s total electricity generation capacity. An LOCs worth US$81 million for establishment of 10 vocational training centres and 4 business incubation centres was signed between the EXIM Bank of India and the Government of Rwanda on 24 May 2017. An LOC worth US$66.6 million to upgrade the Base-Butaro-Kideho road was signed on 14 May 2018.

In early 2019, India gifted medicines worth US$2 million to help Rwanda fight against HIV/AIDS, Hepatitis B and Hepatitis C. India donated 50,000 doses of the Covishield vaccine produced by the Serum Institute of India to help Rwanda during the COVID-19 pandemic. The shipment was delivered to Kigali International Airport on 5 March 2021.

The Government of India offers scholarships and fellowships to Rwandan citizens to pursue under-graduate, post-graduate and research courses in India under the Indian Technical and Economic Cooperation Programme (ITEC), the Special Commonwealth African Assistance Plan (SCAAP), and the Indian Council for Cultural Relations (ICCR). Some Rwanda Defence Force officers have availed training slots in India.

== Indians in Rwanda ==
There were around 3,000 Indian citizens and persons of Indian origin (PIOs) in Rwanda as of July 2021. Rwanda's only sugar refinery and its only modern textile mill are both owned by PIOs.

The Indian Association of Rwanda, founded in 2011, is the primary Indian cultural organisation in Rwanda.

No Indian citizens were killed or injured during the Rwandan genocide in 1994. The Indian Government was able to evacuate its citizens from Rwanda to Bujumbura, Burundi and Nairobi, Kenya without any interference from either Rwandan Patriotic Front (RPF) or Rwandan Government forces.
