= Indian aid to Africa =

Indian aid to Africa is aid provided by the Government of India to African governments. India provides development assistance to Africa through lines of credit, capacity building, duty free and preferential market access, educational scholarships, and humanitarian assistance. Between 2010 and 2024, India provided over US$ 13 billion in concessional aid and grants to African countries. In addition, India donated 150 metric tons of medical aid to 25 African countries to help fight the COVID-19 pandemic, and donated over 24.7 million doses of COVID vaccines to 42 countries in Africa as of February 2021.

== History ==
India's development co-operation with Africa began in 1949, just two years after its independence, when it provided 70 educational scholarships for students to study in India. Co-operation grew further after the 1955 Bandung Conference, a meeting of Asian and African states most of which were newly independent. India was the first Asian country to become a member of the Africa Capacity Building Foundation (ACBF).

At the first India–Africa Forum Summit in 2008, India pledged $5.4 billion in development assistance to African countries. It pledged an additional $5 billion at the second India–Africa Forum Summit in May 2011. The Pan-African e-Network project was launched on 26 February 2009. It is an information and communications technology (ICT) project between India and the African Union that seeks to connect the 55 member states of the Union through a satellite and fibre-optic network to India and to each other to enable access to and sharing of expertise between India and African states in the areas of tele-education, telemedicine, Voice over IP, infotainment, resource mapping, meteorological services, e-governance and e-commerce services. The project is often described as Africa's biggest ever in the ICT sector and is expected to extend ICT infrastructure to rural and previously underserved areas. The second phase of the project called e-VidyaBharti (Tele-education) and e-ArogyaBharti (Tele-medicine) was launched on 7 October 2019. The Indian Foreign Ministry contracted Telecommunications Consultants India to implement the project.

In May 2017, India and Japan proposed building an Asia-Africa Growth Corridor (AAGC) to boost economic development in region. As of May 2019, 42% of all lines of credit extended by India had been extended to African countries.

Over 13 current or former African heads of state and government are graduates of Indian educational and training institutions including Mozambique President Filipe Nyusi, Nigerian President Muhammadu Buhari, and former Tanzanian President Samia Suluhu Hassan. Six current and former chiefs of armed forces in Africa have received training at Indian military institutions.

== Algeria ==
India provided Algeria with US$1 million as humanitarian aid for the victims of the earthquake which struck Algeria in May 2003. Medicines worth half a million US dollars were handed over in April 2004 and $2 million, which is the balance in the form of construction steel for the houses for the victims was handed over in October 2006. The Indian Space Research Organisation launched the Algerian satellite Alsat 2A into orbit in July 2010.

== Angola ==
The Indian Foreign Ministry gifted ambulances manufactured by Mahindra & Mahindra to the Government of Angola as a goodwill gesture in December 2005. India extended a $40 million line of credit (LOC) to Angola for the rehabilitation of the Moçâmedes Railway in 2005. The Government of India also extended to Angola three different grants worth $28.8 million for the purchase of agricultural equipment and infrastructure. The State Bank of India, which opened its representative office in Luanda in April 2005, also extended concessional lines of credit of US$15.8 million for supply of tractors and import of capital equipment from India. The Government of India extended a $30 million aid to set up an industrial park and a $15 million aid to establish a cotton ginning and spinning plant in Angola in 2008–09. In June 2012, the Exim Bank provided a $23 million LOC for supply of tractors, implements and related spares.

Recently, India offered Angola a grant of $100 million in May 2021 for the purchase of naval boats, interceptor crafts and construction of naval vessels and slipways.

== Cameroon ==
India donated 60 tractors and agricultural implements to the Government of Cameroon in 2007. India extended an aid worth $37.65 million on 29 May 2009 to fund rice and maize farm plantations. The Pan-African e-Network project was implemented in Cameroon in June 2010. India established tele-medicine and tele-education projects at the Cameroon State Regional University Yaoundé and its hospital. India provided Cameroon with a grant of $42 million in September 2012 for Cassava plantation projects in the country.

== Madagascar ==
In 2022, India sent 500 tons of rice to flood hit Madagascar. India has donated 15,000 bicycles to the country on the occasion of 'World Bicycle Day' for students who need to walk for hours to get to school.

In 2021, India has sent medicinal assistant to Madagascar also sent food grains to draught hit country.

The initiative was named 'Mission Sagar'.

== Sierra Leone ==
India provides development assistance to Sierra Leone primarily through concessional lines of credit (LOC) and through the ECOWAS Bank for Investment and Development. As of June 2021, India had provided over US$250 million worth of development assistance to Sierra Leone.

India provided US$15 million for agricultural projects including procurement of tractors, harvesters, rice threshers, rice mills, maize shellers and pesticide spray equipment in 2008. A $29.45 million line of credit was provided in 2010 for modernization and expansion of state-owned Sierratel's network and infrastructure, and for the procurement of buses for university and tertiary institutions. India provided $30 million for rehabilitation of existing potable water facilities and addition of new infrastructure to supply potable water in 2010, $20 million for public lighting of Freetown and 13 municipal headquarters through solar energy in 2011, and $78 million to build transmission lines and sub-stations in 2016. In 2018, IBSA (India, Brazil, South Africa) approved a $1 million contribution from the IBSA Fund to expand digital financial services among women, youth, micro, small and medium enterprises in Sierra Leone. In 2019, India provided $45 million for irrigation development in Tomabum aimed at making Sierra Leone self-sufficient in rice production, and for the expansion of rehabilitation of potable water facilities in four communities in Sierra Leone. A $32 million LOC was extended for the construction of the University of Science & Technology at Koidu Town, Kono District in 2020.

India donated 200 military barracks to Sierra Leone in January 2009, which were built by a public sector undertaking. India donated 29 packages of indelible ink in May 2007 for use in Sierra Leone's presidential and parliamentary elections held in September 2007. India also donated 40,000 tonnes of rice to Sierra Leone in June 2008 to meet urgent needs. India implemented the Pan-African e-Network project in Sierra Leone in 2010. In December 2014, India donated $12 million to the United Nations Ebola Response Fund and $50,000 to the World Health Organization to help fight the ebola virus outbreak in Sierra Leone, Liberia and Guinea. The country also donated $50,000 worth of medical equipment and medicines directly to the Government of Sierra Leone. The Permanent Mission of India to the United Nations donated $100,000 to the Special Court for Sierra Leone and $50,000 towards relief efforts for damages caused by floods and mudslide in August 2017. India donated a large consignment of medicines in February 2021 to help Sierra Leone fight the COVID-19 pandemic. India donated 1,000 tonnes of rice to Sierra Leone in March 2021. India shipped 96,000 doses of the Covishield vaccine produced by the Serum Institute of India through COVAX to Freetown on 8 March 2021. India will provide Sierra Leone around 528,000 doses of vaccine through COVAX.

India sent 1,000 metric tons of rice on 24 March 2026 to support Sierra Leone's school midday meal scheme.

== See also ==
- Indian foreign aid
