= Eritrea–India relations =

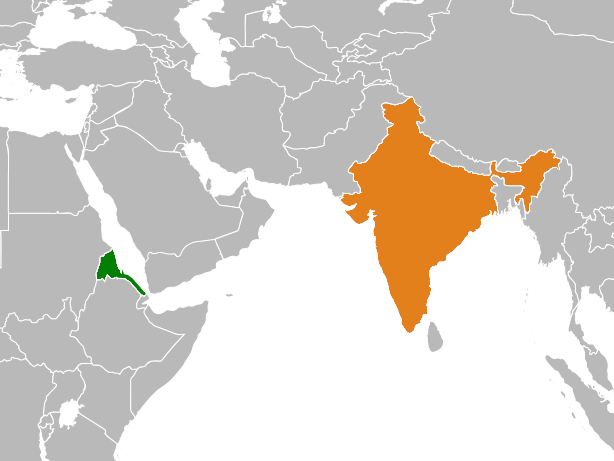

- Eritrea: India

Diplomatic mission
- Embassy of India, Asmara: Embassy of Eritrea, New Delhi

Envoy
- Ambassador Prakash Chand: Ambassador Alem Tsehaye Woldemariam

Eritrea–India relations refers to the international relations that exist between Eritrea and India. Eritrea maintains an embassy in New Delhi. India maintains an embassy in Asmara since 2021. Previously, India was represented to Eritrea through its High Commission in Khartoum, Sudan.

== History ==
=== Early history ===
Trade relations between Africa and India date back to the 1st century AD, when the Kingdom of Aksum was established in present-day Eritrea and the Tigray region of Ethiopia. Aksum's strategic location in the Horn of Africa with access to the Red Sea, made it an important link in the direct trade route between southern India and the Roman Empire. By the 1st century AD, trade routes between India and the Roman Empire had been well established and trade relations between the two regions had developed significantly as the demand for goods from southern India in the Roman Empire increased. Aksum benefited as an important transit point on the busy route. Silks, spices, pepper, glass, brass and copper from India, Egypt and Arabia passed through Adulis, the empire's main port. Aksum primarily exported ivory which was abundantly available within their empire. A Greek-Byzantine ambassador in Aksum recorded in the 5th century that he witnessed a herd of 5000 elephants in the region. A record from the 6th century notes that large elephant tusks were transported by boats from Aksum to India, Persia and Romania.

The Eritrean port of Massawa has been utilized by Indian traders since the 17th century. The 4th Indian Division's 5th Infantry Brigade of the British Indian Army fought in Eritrea in 1941. They secured victory in the decisive Battle of Keren, for which the Bengal Sappers were awarded the Victoria Cross for clearing mines in Metemma.

=== Modern history ===
India formally recognized Eritrea shortly after its de jure independence in May 1993. India offered Eritrea assistance in its legislative drafting process after it became independent. Former Chief Justice of India P.N. Bhagwati conducted a workshop on legislative drafting in Eritrea in January 1995. The two countries signed an MoU on co-operation in Agricultural Research and Education in December 2000, and an MoU on Agriculture Cooperation with the Indian Council for Agricultural Research in June 2006. An agreement on cooperation with the Indira Gandhi National Open University was signed by Eritrean officials in 2010. The first Eritrean Ambassador to India was appointed in 2003.

While a non-permanent member of the UNSC in 2011–12, India served as the Chair of the UNSC's Somalia-Eritrea Sanctions Committee.

No visits at the level of head of state or government has taken place between the two countries. Several Eritrean ministers have visited India. From India, the highest level visits to Eritrea have been at the level of minister of state. Minister of State for External Affairs General V.K. Singh visited Eritrea in September 2015 and met with President Isais Afwerki. Eritrean Foreign Minister Osman Saleh visited India to attend the Third India-Africa Forum Summit in New Delhi in October 2015.

Eritrean Ambassador to India, Alem Tsesaye Woldemariam, serves as the Dean of African Diplomatic Corps in India.

== Trade ==
Bilateral trade between Eritrea and India totaled US$244.73 million in 2014–15, rising sharply from $21.30 million the previous fiscal. India exported $14.06 million worth of goods to Eritrea, and imported $230.68 million. Alongside Italy and the UAE, India is one of the largest exporters to Eritrea. The main commodities exported by India to Eritrea are electrical and miscellaneous engineering equipment, drugs and pharmaceuticals, millets, cotton yarn and fabrics. The major commodities imported by India from Eritrea are leather, hides (excluding raw hides) and skins.

Since 2008, India provides Eritrea unilateral duty free tariff preferential market access for export of goods and services.

India's Exports to Eritrea in Million US $
2014-15	2015-16	2016-17	2017-18	2018–19	2019-20	2020-21 (Apr-Feb)
14.06	6.45	3.22	7.43	9.3	5.92	9.19

India's Imports from Eritrea in Million US $
2014-15	2015-16	2016-17	2017-18	2018–19	2019-20	2020-21 (Apr-Feb)
230.68	167.45	36.41	1.96	00	00	00

== Foreign aid ==
India has provided Eritrea with capacity building assistance in several fields such as legislative drafting, technical scholarships (agriculture, education, health), and food aid. India is a destination for Eritreans for higher studies.

India, Eritrea and FAO signed a trilateral agreement in Rome in 1998, under which India sent 100 agricultural experts to Eritrea to help boost agricultural productivity and production, inland fisheries and aquaculture. India donated 5,000 metric tonnes of wheat to Eritrea in 2003, and previously provided 1,500 metric tonnes of wheat and 200 metric tonnes of sugar as relief assistance. An Indian legal expert was deputed to Eritrea for a period of two years at the request of the Eritrean government. India provided a Line of Credit worth $20 million ($10 million each for education and agriculture projects) to Eritrea in July 2009. India inaugurated its Pan African eNetwork project in Eritrea in August 2010. An expert technical team from the MEA and HMT(I) visited Asmara in October 2014, and finalised plans to establish a Vocational Training Centre in the city.

Citizens of Eritrea are eligible for scholarships under the Indian Technical and Economic Cooperation Programme and the Indian Council for Cultural Relations.

== Indians in Eritrea ==
As of January 2016, around 1,200 Indians reside in Eritrea. The majority of them live and work in and around Asmara. Other regions with sizeable Indian communities include Anseba, Debub, Northern Red Sea region and the Dahlak islands. The community is primarily employed as school teachers, teaching staff at secondary schools and technical colleges such as the Eritrean Institute of Technology, and businessmen. Some are employed as doctors and construction workers. Over 800 Indian teachers are employed at various colleges, vocational training centers and high schools in Eritrea. Indians make up nearly 80% of the faculty of the Eritrea Institute of Technology.

According to the Report of the High level Committee on Indian Diaspora, there were nearly 2,000 Indians in Eritrea in the 1960s. They were primarily employed as teaching staff at secondary schools and technical colleges, as professors at the University of Asmara, and as businessmen.

=== Peacekeepers ===
Over 1,500 Indian troops served in the UN Mission for Ethiopia and Eritrea (UNMEE), and were deployed in both countries until February 2007. Major General Rajender Singh served as the UNMEE Force Commander from 2004 to 2006. Indian troops also provided medical assistance and helped in drilling wells, and construction of roads and dams.
