= Advisor to the Telecom Regulatory Authority of India =

Advisor to the Indian government

Advisor, TRAI of Government of India
- सलाहकार, भारतीय दूरसंचार विनियामक प्राधिकरण
- Residence: Regions
- Appointer: TRAI Chairman
- Website: www.trai.gov.in/

The Advisor, TRAI is the head of different divisions in the Telecom Regulatory Authority of India (TRAI).The advisors are in the rank and pay of Joint Secretaries to Government of India. The advisors look into the ten functional divisions, namely Mobile Network, Interconnection & Fixed Network, BroadBand and Policy Analysis, Quality of Service, Broadcasting & Cable Services, Economic Regulation, Financial Analysis & IFA, Legal, Consumer Affairs & International Relation and RE & Administration & Personnel.Officers are selected from the premier Indian Administrative Service and Indian Revenue Service and also from the Indian Telecommunication Service as well as the Indian Economic Service.

== Regional Offices ==
TRAI has also set up regional offices looking into the regulatory compliance matter in different regions in India.The Bangalore head office looks into regulatory compliance in Karnataka and Kerala.

== See also ==
- Union Council of Ministers of India
- Principal Secretary (India)
