= Information To Every One (i2e1) =

Indian Internet company

i2e1 (Information To Every One) is a Wi-Fi management company based in India. The company was incubated by Indian Institute of Technology Delhi. The Board of Directors of the company include Satyam Darmora, Siddharth Nautiyal, and Brijesh Damodaran.

The company's core offerings are: Wi-Fi management solutions, Wi-Fi based retail analytics, and proximity marketing for offline merchants.

== Background ==
In 2017, the company had approximately 10,000 Wi-Fi hot-spots in 52 cities across India.Along with providing Analytics Solution to Offline Retail Industry, the company has positioned itself as a low-cost internet model for Indian masses. i2e1 was a part of Telecom Regulatory Authority of India initiative of Public Open Wi-Fi Pilot Project from December 2017 – Mar 2018. During the Pilot, the company installed Fully-Sponsored Wi-Fi access at 157 locations and demonstrated a low cost and inter-operable Wi-Fi model. This model is expected to catalyze Public Wi-Fi ecosystem in India and the Government expects 100,000 hot-spots within 3 months of launch.

== History ==
i2e1 was founded in February 2015 by Satyam Darmora. The company has 5 Co-Founders: Nishit Aggarwal, Gaurav Bansal, Ashutosh Mishra, Maanas Dwivedi and Anugrah Adams. Most of the founders are graduate from Indian Institute of Technology and Indian Institute of Management

== Funding ==
i2e1 raised seed round funding of $500,000 in December 2015 by growX ventures and 3One4 capital. In Nov 2017, the company raised 2nd round (Series A) funding of $3 million by Omidyar Network, Auxano Ventures and 3one4 capital SGAN is also an investor in the company.

== Awards and recognition ==
- In May 2017, i2e1 was the only Indian Company to be recognized by CB Insights as 'Transforming Brick-And-Mortar Retail'
- In September 2017, i2e1 was awarded as the Best Wi-Fi Startup at My India Wi-Fi India Summit & Awards 2017 by Digi Analysis
- In September 2018, Satyam Darmora (Founder, i2e1) was felicitated by Business World for being a 40Under40 entrepreneur
