= Ministry of Communications (India) =

Government ministry of India

- Branch of Government of India

- Ministry of Communications

Ministry overview
- Formed: 19 July 2016; 10 years ago
- Preceding Ministry: Ministry of Communications and Information Technology
- Jurisdiction: Government of India
- Headquarters: Sanchar Bhawan 20, Ashoka Road, New Delhi, Delhi, India
- Annual budget: ₹102,267.02 crore (US$11 billion) (2026–27)
- Minister responsible: Jyotiraditya Scindia, Minister for Communications
- Ministry executives: Amit Agrawal, IAS, Chairman of Telecom Commission and Telecom Secretary; Subrat Das, IPoS, Posts Secretary
- Child agencies: Department of Telecommunications; Department of Posts
- Website: dot.gov.inwww.indiapost.gov.in

The Ministry of Communications (IAST: Sañcāra Mantrālaya) is a ministry of the Government of India. It is responsible for regulating telecommunications and postal service. It was carved out of Ministry of Communications and Information Technology on 19 July 2016.

It consists of two departments viz. Department of Telecommunications and the Department of Posts.

It is also the Cadre Controlling Authority for Indian Telecommunication Service, Indian Postal Service and Indian Post & Telecommunication Accounts and Finance Service.

== History ==
Ministry of Communication and Information Technology was bifurcated into Ministry of Communications and Ministry of Electronics and Information Technology.

== Department of Telecommunications ==
Also known as the Door Sanchar Vibhag, this department concerns itself with policy, licensing and coordination matters relating to telegraphs, telephones, wireless, data, facsimile and telematic services and other similar forms of communications.

It also looks into the administration of laws with respect to any of the matters specified, namely:

- The Telecommunications Act, 2023 replaced the Indian Telegraph Act, 1885 and Indian Wireless Telegraphy Act, 1933. The act aims to consolidate laws relating to development, expansion and operation of telecommunication services and networks.
- The Telecom Regulatory Authority of India Act, 1997

Regulatory Authority

- Telecom Regulatory Authority of India

Central Public Sector Undertakings

- Bharat Sanchar Nigam Limited
- Telecommunications Consultants India Limited
- ITI Limited

Autonomous Institutes

- National Communications Academy
- Institution of Electronics and Telecommunication Engineers

R&D Unit

- Centre for Development of Telematics

Specialised Units

- Telecom Engineering Center
- Controller of Communication Accounts
- Telecom Enforcement Resource and Monitoring (TERM) cells

In 2007, in order to distinctly address the issues of Communication Network Security at DOT (HQ) level, consequent to enhancement of FDI limit in Telecom sector from 49% to 74%, a new wing named Security was created in DOT (HQ).

Objectives

- e-Government: Providing e-infrastructure for delivery of e-services
- e-Industry: Promotion of electronics hardware manufacturing and IT-ITeS industry
- e-Innovation / R&D: Implementation of R&D Framework - Enabling creation of Innovation/ R&D Infrastructure in emerging areas of ICT&E/Establishment of mechanism for R&D translation
- e-Learning: Providing support for development of e-Skills and Knowledge network
- e-Security: Securing India's cyber space
- e-Inclusion: Promoting the use of ICT for more inclusive growth
- Internet Governance: Enhancing India's role in Global Platforms of Internet Governance.

== Department of Posts ==
The Department of Post (DoP) which wholly the India Post operates one of the oldest and most extensive mail services in the world. As of 31 March 2017, the Indian Postal Service has 154,965 post offices, of which 139,067 (89.74%) are in rural areas and 15,898 (10.26%) are in urban areas. It has 25,585 departmental PO s and 129,380 ED BPOs. At the time of independence, there were 23,344 post offices, which were primarily in urban areas. Thus the network has registered a sevenfold growth since independence, with the focus of the expansion primarily in rural areas. On average, a post office serves an area of 21.56 sq; km and a population of 7,753 people. This is the most widely distributed post office system in the world. The large numbers are a result of a long tradition of many disparate postal systems which were unified in the Indian Union post-Independence. Owing to this far-flung reach and its presence in remote areas, the Indian postal service is also involved in other services such as small savings banking and financial services, with about 25,464 full-time and 139,040 part-time post offices. It offers a whole range of products under posts, remittance, savings, insurance, and philately. While the Director-General is the head of operations, the Secretary is an adviser to the Minister. Both responsibilities are undertaken by one officer.

The DG is assisted by the Postal Services Board with six members: The six members of the Board hold portfolios of Personnel, Operations, Technology, Postal Life Insurance, Banking, Planning respectively. Shri Ananta Narayan Nanda is the Secretary (Posts) also the Chairman of the Postal Services Board and Ms.Meera Handa is Director General (DG) Posts. Shri.Vineet Pandey(Additional Charge) Additional Director General(Coordination) (ADG), Ms. Arundhaty Ghosh, Member (Operations), Shri. Biswanath Tripathy, Member (Planning), Shri Pradipta Kumar Bisoi, Member (Personnel), Shri Udai Krishna, Member (Banking), Shri Salim Haque, Member (Technology) and Shri. Vineet Pandey, Member (PLI) & Chairman, Investment Board. The national headquarters are at Delhi and functions from Dak Bhavan located at the junction of Parliament Street and Ashoka Road.

The total revenue earned including remuneration for Savings Bank & Savings Certificate work during the year 2016-17 was ₹11,511.00 crores and the amount received from other Ministries/ Departments as Agency charges (recoveries) was ₹730.90 crores and expenditure is ₹24,211.85 crores during 2016–2017 against the previous year expenditure of ₹19,654.67 crores. The increase was mainly due to payment of increased pay & allowances consequent upon implementation of 7th pay commission recommendations, leave encashment during LTC, cost of materials, oil, diesel, revision of service tax on government buildings etc.

Limited investment in infrastructure and technology has contributed to lower revenue. The current management team has begun investing in modern technology and infrastructure to strengthen operational capabilities. At the same time, efforts are underway to improve service quality and introduce new products to remain competitive in the market.The field services are managed by Postal Circles—generally conforming to each State—except for the North Eastern States, India has been divided into 22 postal circles, each circle headed by a Chief Postmaster General. Each Circle is further divided into Regions comprising field units, called Divisions, headed by a Postmaster General. Further divided into divisions headed by SSPOs & SPOs. further divisions are divided into Sub Divisions Headed by ASPs & IPS. Other functional units like Circle Stamp Depots, Postal Stores Depots, and Mail Motor Service may exist in the Circles and Regions.

=== Army Postal Service ===
Besides the 23 circles, there is a special Circle called the "Base Circle" to cater to the postal services of the Armed Forces of India. Army Postal Services (APS) is a unique arrangement to take care of the postal requirement of soldiers posted across the country. Department of Posts personnel is commissioned into the army to take care of APS. The Base Circle is headed by an Additional Director General, Army Postal Service, holding a Major general.

=== Indian Post Office Act, 2023 ===
The DoP is governed by the Indian Post Office Act, 2023. The act aims to consolidate and amend the law relating to Post Office in India along with expansion and modernization of its services. The Bill also replaces colonial era, Indian Post Office Act of 1898.

=== Modern Services of DoP ===
Other than the traditional postage service to keep up with the age, many new services have been introduced by the department:

- e-Post - Delivery of email through postman where email service is not available
- e-BillPost - Convenient way to pay bills under one roof
- Postal Life insurance
- International money transfers
- Mutual funds
- Banking

Training Institute

- Rafi Ahmed Kidwai National Postal Academy (RAKNPA), Ghaziabad

== See also ==
- Union Council of Ministers
- Ministry of Electronics and Information Technology
- List of agencies of the government of India
- Indian Telecommunication Service
- Indian Postal Service
- Indian Post & Telecommunication Accounts and Finance Service
- Post Office Act, 2023
- Telecommunications Act, 2023
