= Indian Telecommunication Service =

Indian government department

Indian Telecommunications Service

Service Overview
- Formerly known as: Telegraph Engineering Service Class-I (TES Class-I)
- Abbreviation: ITS
- Formed: 1965; 61 years ago
- Country: India
- Headquarters: Sanchar Bhawan; New Delhi
- Training Academy: National Communications Academy, Ghaziabad, www.ntiprit.gov.in
- Cadre Controlling Authority: Department of Telecommunications, Ministry of Communications
- Minister responsible: Jyotiraditya Scindia, Minister of Communications
- Legal Personality: Governmental; Engineering
- Cadre Size: 1690
- Selection: Engineering Services Examination
- Association: Indian Telecommunications Service Association

Service Chief
- Member (Services), Digital Communications Commission: Shri Anand Khare, ITS

Head of the Civil Services
- Cabinet Secretary: Shri T. V. Somanathan, IAS

The Indian Telecommunications Service ( भारतीय दूरसंचार सेवा), widely known as ITS, and earlier known as Telegraph Engineering Service Class I (TES Class I) is one of the Central Civil Services under Group 'A' of the executive branch of the Government of India. The appointment to this service is done through Combined Engineering Services Exam held every year by Union Public Service Commission (UPSC) of India. The service was created to meet the techno managerial needs of the government in areas related to telecommunications. The Department of Telecommunications (DoT) had been managed for years by the officers of this permanent cadre, called the Indian Telecommunications Service (ITS). The officers of ITS work under restrictions and rules of Central Civil Services (Conduct) rules.

The engineering officers of ITS are working in senior positions in the Department of Telecommunications (DoT), Telecom Enforcement Resource and Monitoring (TERM Cells) now known as DoT Licensed Service Area (LSA), Bharat Sanchar Nigam Limited (BSNL), Mahanagar Telephone Nigam (MTNL), Telecommunications Consultants India Limited (TCIL), Telecom Regulatory Authority of India (TRAI), Telecom Disputes Settlement and Appellate Tribunal (TDSAT), Unique Identification Authority of India (UIDAI), Central Vigilance Commission (CVC), Metro Rail Corporations etc. At present, ITS officers are also working in many Departments of the central government and state government on deputation.

Department of Telecommunications, Ministry of Communications, under the Government of India, is the Cadre Controlling Authority of the Indian Telecommunications Service.

== History ==
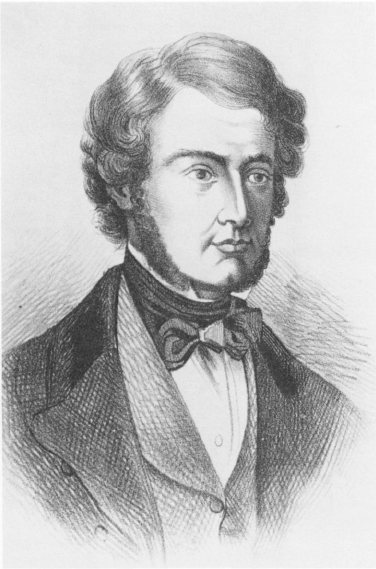
William Brooke O'Shaughnessy, who is widely considered as the father of Indian Telegraph.

Telecommunications in India began with the introduction of the telegraph. The Indian postal and telecom sectors are one of the world's oldest. In 1850, the first experimental electric telegraph line was started between Calcutta and Diamond Harbour. In 1851, it was opened for the use of the British East India Company. The Posts and Telegraphs department occupied a small corner of the Public Works Department, at that time.

The construction of 4,000 miles (6,400 km) of telegraph lines was started in November 1853. These connected Kolkata (then Calcutta) and Peshawar in the north; Agra, Mumbai (then Bombay) through Sindwa Ghats, and Chennai (then Madras) in the south; Ootacamund and Bangalore. William O'Shaughnessy, who pioneered the telegraph and telephone in India, belonged to the Public Works Department, and worked towards the development of telecom throughout this period. A separate department was opened in 1854 when telegraph facilities were opened to the public.

In the beginning the Indian Telegraph Department (ITD) comprised operating and maintenance staff, headed by one Superintendent of Telegraphs and with three Deputy Superintendents in Bombay, Madras and Pegu in Burma and Inspectors at Indore, Agra, Kanpur and Banares. The first Superintendent was William O'Shaughnessy, who later became the first Director-General of ITD. The first India-Ceylon cable was laid in 1858. In 1865, the first Indo-European telegraph communication was effected and two years later a new cable was laid between India and Ceylon (Sri Lanka). In 1873, Duplex telegraphy was introduced between Bombay and Calcutta.

In 1880, two telephone companies namely The Oriental Telephone Company Ltd. and The Anglo-Indian Telephone Company Ltd. approached the Government of India to establish telephone exchange in India. The permission was refused on the grounds that the establishment of telephones was a Government monopoly and that the Government itself would undertake the work. In 1881, the Government later reversed its earlier decision and a licence was granted to the Oriental Telephone Company Limited of England for opening telephone exchanges at Calcutta, Bombay, Madras and Ahmedabad and the first formal telephone service was established in the country. On 28 January 1882, Major E. Baring, Member of the Governor General of India's Council declared open the Telephone Exchanges in Calcutta, Bombay and Madras. The exchange in Calcutta named the "Central Exchange" had a total of 93 subscribers in its early stage. Later that year, Bombay also witnessed the opening of a telephone exchange.

The important year was 1905 when the control of the Telegraph Department was transferred from the PWD to the Commerce & Industry Department except for matters connected with buildings and electricity. A year later, the baudot system was introduced between Calcutta and Bombay and between Calcutta and Rangoon. In 1907, women signallers were employed for the first time. In 1910 the technical branch came into being as a separate organisation under the Electrical Engineer in Chief. The next two years saw the introduction of Circle Scheme and decentralisation and two years later, that is, in 1914, the Postal and Telegraph Departments were amalgamated under a single Director-General. The year also witnessed the opening of the first automatic exchange at Simla (Shimla) with a capacity of 700 lines and 400 actual connections.

Radio telephone communications between England and India were opened in 1933; the Indo-Burma Radio Telephone service started functioning between Madras and Rangoon in 1936; the Burma and Aden telegraph systems, which were a part of the Indian telegraph system, got separated in 1937; deluxe telegrams with foreign countries were introduced in 1937; the Bombay-Australian wireless telegraph service and Bombay-China wireless service were inaugurated in 1942; the Bombay, Calcutta and Madras Telephone Systems were taken over by the ITD in 1943; a Telecommunications Development Board was set up; the Bombay-New York Wireless Telegraph Service was commissioned in 1944.

In the 1980s, the first satellite earth station for domestic communications was set up at Secundrabad, the Troposcatter system link with the Soviet Union was inaugurated, the first SPC electronic digital telex exchange and the first SPC analogue electronic trunk automatic exchange were commissioned in Bombay, the Centre for Development of Telematics (C-DOT) was established, the first mobile telephone service and the first radio paging service were introduced in Delhi, Mahanagar Telephone Nigam Ltd. (MTNL) and Videsh Sanchar Nigam Ltd. (VSNL) were set up, and the international gateway packet switch system was commissioned in Bombay. The 1980s also saw the restructuring of the P&T Department into the Department of Posts and the Department of Telecommunications, the constitution of Telecom Commission, and the reorganisation of telecommunication circles with the Secondary Switching Areas as the basic units.

Indian Telecommunications Service (ITS) was constituted in 1965 as Telegraph Engineering Service Group 'A' which was renamed as ITS in 1978. Prior to this, this service was known as "Superior Telegraph Engineering and Wireless Branches of the Posts and Telegraphs Department" dating to pre-independence times. This service is primarily responsible for policy, technical, administrative and managerial functions of the government in the areas related to telecommunications.

== Recruitment ==
ITS (Indian Telecommunications Service) is an organized Group-A service for which recruitment is conducted through competitive examination called Engineering Service Examination (ESE) which is a three-stage competitive examination (preliminary, main and personality tests) and is conducted by the UPSC every year. Officers recruited through ESE manage diverse fields. Recruitment by UPSC to Group A Services/Posts are made under the following categories of Engineering:

I. Civil Engineering
II. Mechanical Engineering
III. Electrical Engineering
IV. Electronics & Telecommunication Engineering

Appointments to ITS are made in category IV, i.e., Electronics & Telecommunication Engineering.

== Training ==
After recruitment through Engineering Services Examination conducted by UPSC, Each officer in Group A, is appointed by the President of India at his/her pleasure.The officers undergo a rigorous two-year probation course at National Communications Academy (NCA) (www.ntiprit.gov.in) at Ghaziabad where ITS probationers are groomed as Future leaders to handle various techno-managerial matters in Government of India. During probation, ITS Officers undergo various study visits across India to study various ICT best practices and practical exposure of various technological developments. To foster innovation and to create holistic development of probationers, ITS probationers also undergo various attachments to TRAI, NoCC, Smart City Mission, Election Commission of India, NDMA etc. Officers also undergo a 15-week Foundation course where they are provided with Rural and Urban site visit exposure along with various management and administration functions like Law, Polity, Disaster Management, Management etc.

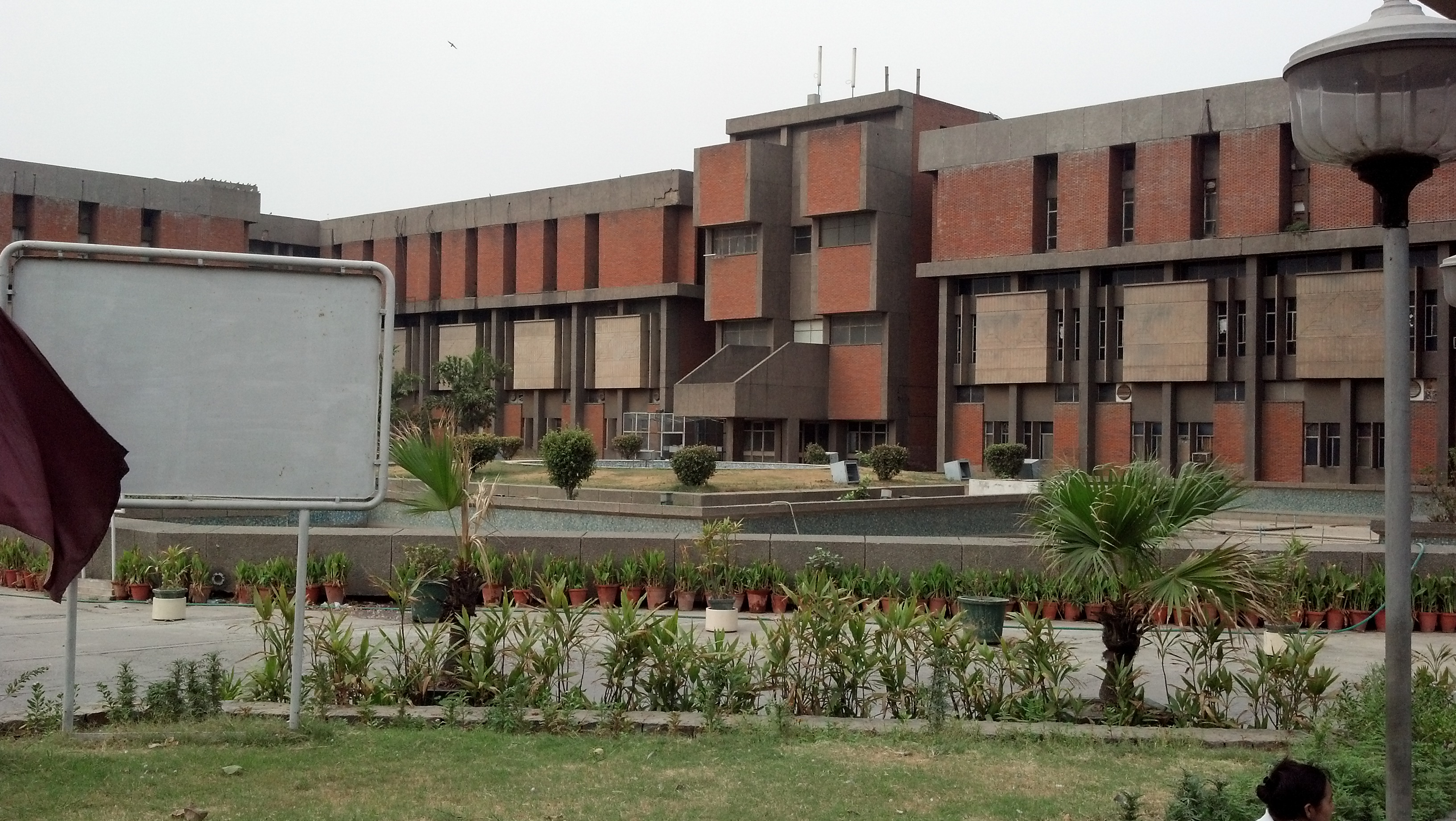
NCA, Ghaziabad

As ITS Officers are backbone enablers of various digital technological developments in India, they are imparted latest training pertaining to various administrative and technical aspects. The officers are also deputed for on job field training in various areas like Disaster Management, Coordination with states, telecom operations etc. During probation, Officers also get the opportunity to meet various Government dignitaries like Hon'ble President of India, Hon'ble Vice President of India and Hon'ble Minister of Communications etc.

== Appointments and responsibilities ==
After Selection through UPSC Engineering Services Exam, ITS Officers attend 2 years Probationary training. After probation, ITS Officers are posted in DoT HQs, Telecom Engineering Centre, DoT LSA Units (Field Enforcement Units of DoT) at all India locations. ITS officers are working at various positions across India and are liable to be transferred across India. The officers of ITS work in DoT, TRAI, TDSAT, Cabinet Secretariat, Ministry of Home Affairs, CBI, MEITY, UIDAI, Ministry of Power, Department of Pharmaceuticals, Department of Defence, National Highway Authority of India, RITES, IRCON, TCIL, UPSC, SSC, Patents and Copyrights Office, Election Commission of India, IBBI, SFIO, SAI, MCD, DDA, FIU, Merto Rail Corporations, ITPO, NeGD, North Eastern Council and various other Ministries and Statutory bodies of India along with various state governments. ITS officers are not only playing a key role in various ICT initiatives of Government of India but a key contributors in assisting states in formation of their ICT policies of states like IoT policies, Electronics Manufacturing etc.

=== Brief Duties and Responsibilities of Officers of ITS GR.'A' ===
I. Issuing various types of Licenses/Registrations to Telecom Service Providers, Internet Service Providers etc and other service providers etc.
II. Handling Matters related to National Security and Lawful Interception
III. Handling of Policy, Licensing and Coordination matters relating to telegraphs, Satellite, telephones, wireless, data, facsimile and telematic services and other like forms of communications in Department of Telecommunications
IV. International cooperation in matters connected with telecommunications including matters relating to all international bodies dealing with telecommunications such as International Telecommunication Union (ITU), its Radio Regulation Board (RRB), Radio Communication Sector (ITU-R), Telecommunication Standardization Sector (ITU-T), Development Sector (ITU-D), International Telecommunication Satellite Organization (Intelsat), International Mobile Satellite Organization (Inmarsat), Asia Pacific Telecommunication (APT).
V. Handling various National Importance projects like Bharat Net Project (backbone of Flagship Mission-Digital India Campaign), LWE Project, NE Telecom Connectivity plan etc.
VI. Coordination with various state Authorities for CCTNS Project, anchoring of CERTs, Smart City Project, Disaster Management, RoW issues, EMF Monitoring.
VII. Ensuring Network coverage/connectivity of villages for Direct Benefit Transfer (DBT) mission and of Banks in rural areas under Financial Inclusion Planning (FIP)
VIII. Design, Planning, Implementation of projects funded by DoT & USOF
IX. Making various ICT related standards pertaining to various ICT products along with preparation of various GRs, IRs, White papers etc and Improving the ICT Development Index of India.
X. Human Resource Development and Capacity Building of ITS, Gr.'A'
XI. Investigation and curbing of Illegal activities in Telecom Networks, Analysis of Telecom Traffic, Call drop issues etc..
XII. Works related to inspection of sites related to EMR Measurement and monitoring etc..
XIII. Various Audits related to CAF, Security Audit of Networks of all Telecom and Internet Service Providers of India.
XIV. Act as a technical interface between Law Enforcement Agencies (LEAs) and Telecom Service Providers.
XV. Interface with various departments of state governments in general and IT departments in particular for steering National Broadband Mission and orderly growth of Telecom sector in each state/LSA including the Disaster preparedness and response.

=== ITS Group A Central Civil Service ===
Ranks, designations, and positions held by Indian Telecom Service (ITS) officers in their career
Grade / Scale (Level on Pay Matrix)	Posting in Department of Telecommunications (DoT)	Position in Government of India	Position in Order of precedence in India	Pay Scale (Basic Pay)
Apex Scale (Pay Level 17)	Director General of Telecommunications Member, Telecom Commission / Digital Communications Commission	Secretary	23	₹225,000 (US$2,700)
Higher Administrative Grade + (Pay Level 16)	Special Director General (Telecom) Advisor, DoT Headquarters	Additional Secretary	25	₹205,400 (US$2,400)—₹224,400 (US$2,700)
Higher Administrative Grade (Pay Level 15)	Additional Director General (Telecom) Senior Deputy Director General, DoT HQ	Additional Secretary	25	₹182,200 (US$2,200)—₹224,100 (US$2,700)
Senior Administrative Grade (Pay Level 14)	Deputy Director General (Telecom)	Joint Secretary	26	₹144,200 (US$1,700)—₹218,200 (US$2,600)
Selection Grade (Pay Level 13)	Director	Director		₹123,100 (US$1,500)—₹215,900 (US$2,600)
Junior Administrative Grade (Pay Level 12)	Director	Deputy Secretary		₹78,800 (US$930)—₹209,200 (US$2,500)
Senior Time Scale (Pay Level 11)	Assistant Director General	Under Secretary		₹67,700 (US$800)—₹208,700 (US$2,500)
Junior Time Scale (Pay Level 10)	Assistant Divisional Engineer (Telecom) Entry-level (Probationer)	Assistant Secretary		₹56,100 (US$660)—₹177,500 (US$2,100)

== Cadre controlling authority ==
Member (Services), Digital Communications Commission (DCC) of India is cadre controlling authority of ITS, Group A. Member(Services)is ex officio Secretary to Government of India. ' Currently, Shri Uma Shanky P, ITS is Member(Services), Department of Telecom, Government of India and cadre controlling authority of Indian Telecommunications Service.

== See also ==
- Civil Services of India
- All India Service
