= Pramod Kumar Mishra =

13th Principal Secretary to the Prime Minister of India (born 1948)

Dr. Pramod Kumar Mishra
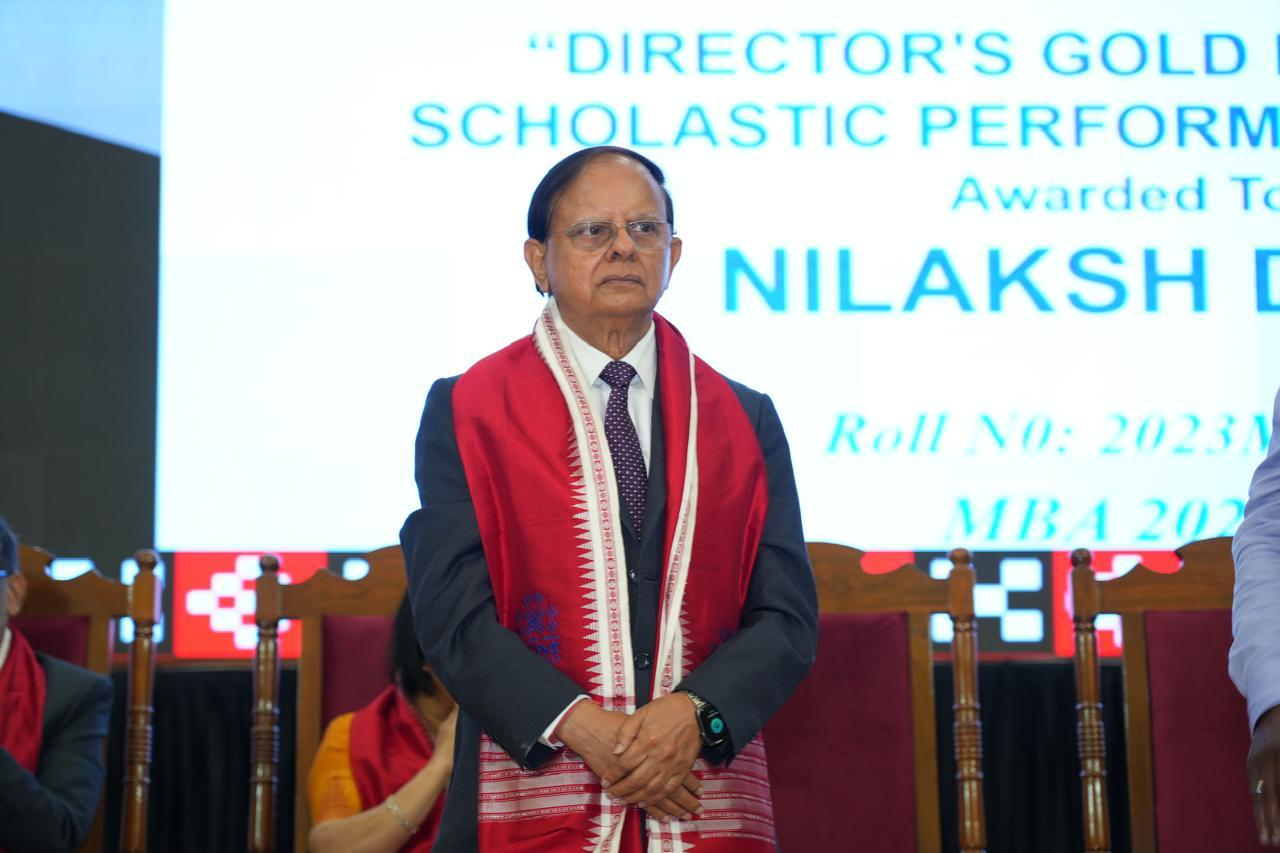
- Mishra in 2025

15th Principal Secretary to the Prime Minister of India
- Incumbent
- Assumed office 11 September 2019 Serving with Shaktikanta Das (2025-)
- Prime Minister: Narendra Modi
- Preceded by: Nripendra Misra

Chairman of Gujarat Electricity Regulatory Commission
- In office 2 September 2008 – 11 August 2013

Agriculture Secretary of India
- In office 1 December 2006 – 31 August 2008

Personal details
- Born: 11 August 1948 (age 78) Sambalpur, Odisha, India
- Education: Sambalpur University; Delhi School of Economics; Delhi University; University of Sussex
- Occupation: Bureaucrat; civil servant
- Employer: Indian Administrative Services

Dr. Pramod Kumar Mishra (IAST: Pramoda Kumāra Miśra; born 11 August 1948), often abbreviated P. K. Mishra, is a retired IAS officer of 1972 batch belonging to Gujarat cadre and serves as the 15th and current Principal Secretary to the Prime Minister of India. Between 2001 and 2004, Mishra has also served as the chief secretary of Modi, when he was the Chief Minister of Gujarat.

== Education ==
He did his M.A. in economics with a first class at the Delhi School of Economics in 1973. He later did an M.A. in Development economics in 1990 and a Ph.D. in Economics/Development Studies from the University of Sussex.

== Career ==
On 11 September 2019, he was appointed as the Principal Secretary of the Prime Minister of India. Apart from serving as the Additional Principal Secretary in the Prime Minister's Office, Mishra has served in various key positions for both Indian and Gujarat governments, such as the Additional Chief Secretary (Revenue), Principal Secretary (Agriculture and Cooperation), Principal Secretary to the Chief Minister of Gujarat, member of the Gujarat Electricity Board, and as the district magistrate and collector of Mehsana and Banaskantha districts in the Government of Gujarat, and as the Union Agriculture Secretary, special secretary in Ministry of Home Affairs, additional secretary in Ministry of Urban Development, and as the member secretary of National Capital Region Planning Board in the Government of India.

After his retirement from the Indian Administrative Service, Mishra was appointed the chairman of Gujarat Electricity Regulatory Commission by the Chief Minister of Gujarat. His term as the chairman of commission came to an end on 11 August 2013, when he attained the age of 65.

=== Principal Secretary to the Prime Minister ===
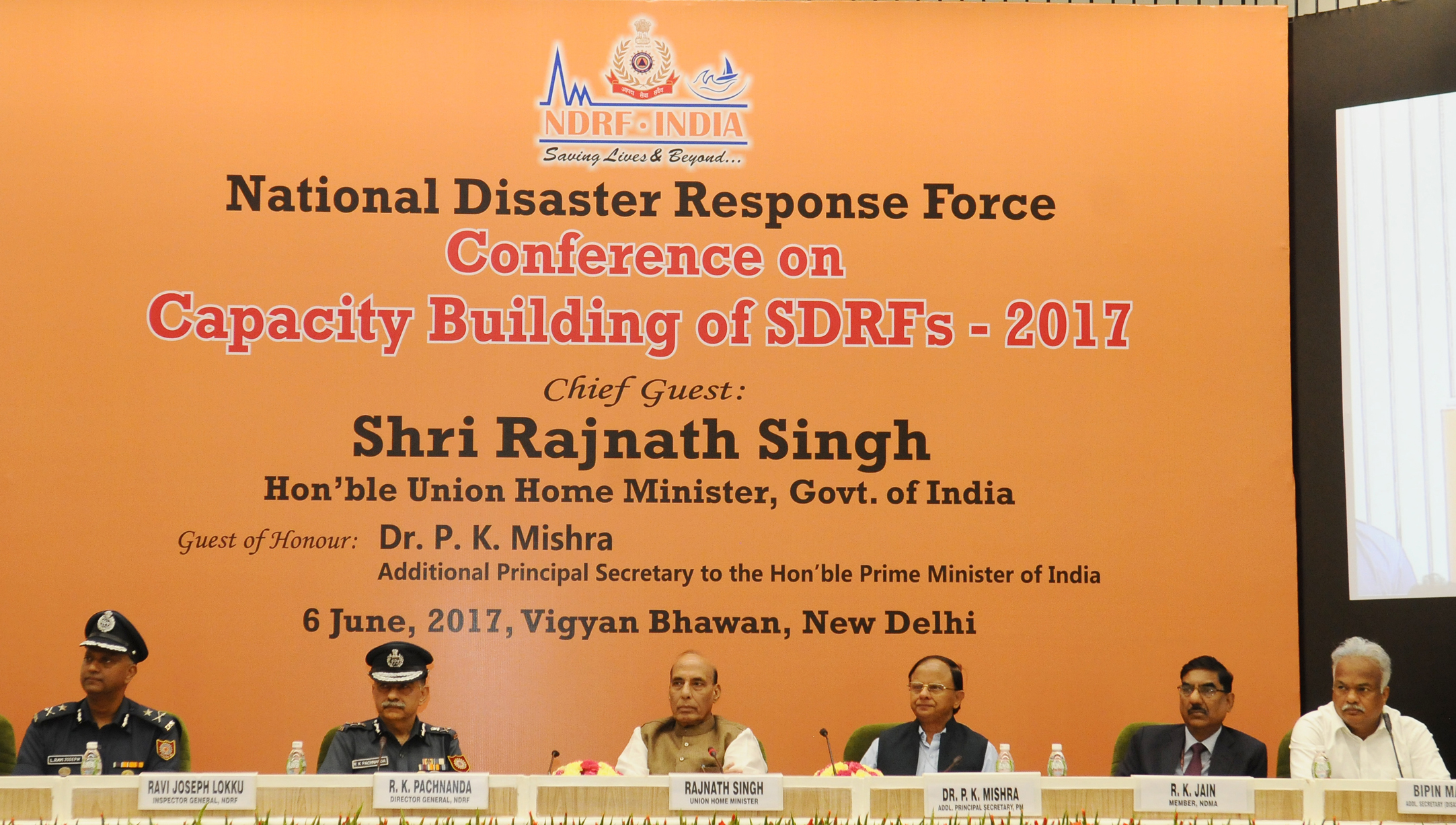
Mishra (centre-right) with Minister of Home Affairs, Rajnath Singh (centre) and National Disaster Response Force (NDRF) director general R. K. Pachnanda (centre-left).

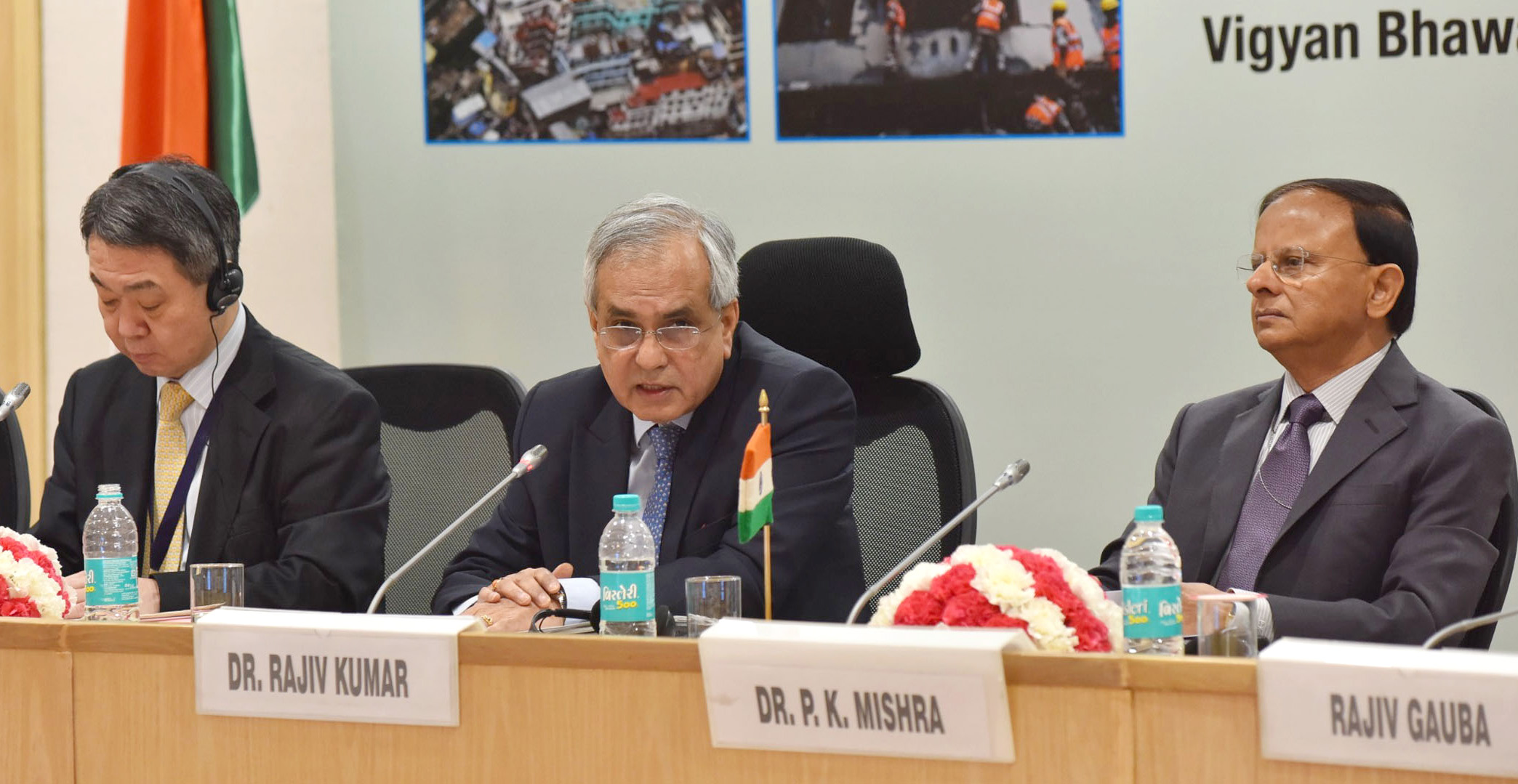
Mishra (right) with NITI Aayog vice-chairman Rajiv Kumar (centre) and a Japanese vice-minister for policy coordination in Cabinet Office, Mamoru Maekawa (left).

After the election of Narendra Modi as the Prime Minister of India, Mishra was appointed as the Additional Principal Secretary to the Prime Minister of India, in the rank and status of Cabinet Secretary, the Government of India's topmost bureaucrat, and was deemed to have been re-employed into the IAS.

On 11 June 2019, Mishra was re-appointed as Additional Principal Secretary to Prime Minister Narendra Modi. The Appointments Committee of the Cabinet approved his appointment along with the re-appointment of Principal Secretary Nripendra Misra with effect from 31 May 2019. These appointments were designated to be co-terminous with the term of the Prime Minister. On 11 September 2019 PK Mishra was appointed as the sole Principal Secretary to the Prime Minister of India.

== Awards ==
- United Nations Office for Disaster Risk Reduction (UNDRR) on 17 May 2019 conferred the Sasakawa Award 2019 for Disaster Risk Reduction.
