= Telecom Disputes Settlement and Appellate Tribunal =

Indian government tribunal

Telecommunications Dispute Settlement and Appellate Tribunal (TDSAT)
- Established: 2000
- Jurisdiction: India
- Location: TDSAT, 3rd Floor Hotel Samrat, Kautilya Marg, Chanakyapuri, New Delhi - 110 021
- Composition method: Appointments made by the Government of India
- Authorised by: Created by Telecom Regulatory Authority of India Act, 1997 Amendment 2000
- Appeals to: Supreme Court of India
- Judge term length: 3 years
- Number of positions: 3
- Website: Official website
- Currently: Justice Dhirubhai Naranbhai Patel

The Telecommunications Dispute Settlement and Appellate Tribunal (TDSAT) was established to adjudicate disputes and dispose of appeals with a view to protect the interests of service providers and consumers of the Indian telecommunications sector and to promote and ensure its orderly growth.

== History ==
The policy of liberalisation that was embarked by Prime Minister P. V. Narasimha Rao in the 1990s helped the Indian Telecom sector to grow rapidly. The government gradually allowed the entry of the private sectors into telecom equipment manufacturing, value added services, radio paging and cellular mobile services. In 1994, the government formed the National Telecom Policy (NTP) which helped to attract Foreign Direct Investments (FDI) and domestic investments. The entry of private and international players resulted in need of independent regulatory body. As a result, The Telecom Regulatory Authority of India (TRAI) was established on 20 February 1997 by an act of parliament called "Telecom Regulatory Authority of India Act 1997".

The mission of TRAI was to create and nurture an environment which will enable quick growth of the telecommunication sector in the country. One of the major objective of TRAI is to provide a transparent policy environment. TRAI has regularly issued orders and directions on various subjects like tariff, interconnections, Direct To Home (DTH) services and mobile number portability.

In 2000, the Vajpayee government constituted the Telecommunications Dispute Settlement Appellate Tribunal (TDSAT) through an amendment of the 1997 act, through an ordinance. The primary objective of TDSAT's establishment was to release TRAI from adjudicatory and dispute settlement functions in order to strengthen the regulatory framework. Any dispute involving parties like licensor, licensee, service provider and consumers are resolved by TDSAT. Moreover, any direction, order or decision of TRAI can be challenged by appealing in TDSAT.

== Organisation structure ==
The TDSAT consists of a Chairperson and two Members.

The current composition of the Tribunal is:

Name	Designation
Justice Dhirubhai Naranbhai Patel	Chairperson
Justice Ram Krishna Gautam	Member
Dr Sanjeev Banzal	Member

List of former Chairmen of TDSAT:

Name	Tenure
Justice Suhas C. Sen	29 May 2000 to 20 December 2002
Justice D.P. Wadhwa	1 January 2003 to 4 May 2005
Justice N. Santosh Hegde	27 June 2005 to 2 August 2006
Justice Arun Kumar	6 September 2006 to 5 September 2009
Justice S. B. Sinha	3 November 2009 to 2 November 2012
Justice Aftab Alam	17 June 2013 to 16 June 2016
Shiva Kirti Singh	21 April 2017 to 14 March 2022

List of former Members of TDSAT:

Name	Tenure
R.U.S. Prasad	29 September 2000 to 28 September 2003
P.R. Dasgupta	3 October 2000 to 2 October 2003
Vinod Vaish	1 April 2004 to 31 March 2007
Lt Gen D.P.Sehgal	15 September 2004 to 14 September 2007
Dr. J.S. Sarma	28 July 2008 to 13 May 2009
Govind Das Gaiha	28 July 2008 to 28 July 2011
Pramod Kumar Rastogi	19 February 2010 to 18 February 2013

== See also ==
- Communications in India
- The Telecom Commercial Communication Customer Preference Regulations, 2010
