= Sim closure fraud =

Type of fraud

The TRAI SIM Closure Fraud is a scam in India where fraudsters impersonate the Telecom Regulatory Authority of India (TRAI) to deceive mobile users into closing their SIM cards. This scheme has drawn attention for its alarming tactics and risk of identity theft.

== Nature of fraud ==
The fraud often includes fake SMS messages and calls posing as TRAI support, instructing users to close their mobile numbers due to alleged fraud case or KYC updates. These messages and calls create urgency, warning that services will be cut off unless users comply. Scammers aim to steal sensitive personal information, such as Aadhaar numbers or bank details, by pretending to be legitimate authorities.

== Trai Response ==
In response to this growing threat, TRAI has issued warnings advising users to be cautious of such communications. They emphasize that TRAI does not contact users via calls or messages regarding SIM closures. Users are urged to ignore these fraudulent messages and report them to their telecom operators or through the Central Government's Sanchar Sathi portal.
