= Telecommunications Consultants India =

Government sector in India

Telecommunications Consultants India Limited
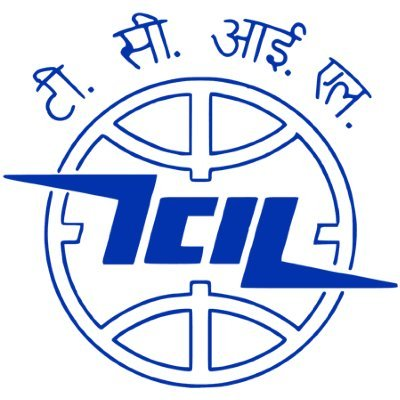
- Type: Central Public Sector Undertaking
- Headquarters: New Delhi, India
- Area served: Worldwide
- Key people: Ashwini Vaishnaw (Cabinet Minister for Communications); Sh S T Abbas, ITS (Chairman & Managing Director)
- Owner: Department of Telecommunications, Ministry of Communications, Government of India
- Website: www.tcil.net.in

Telecommunications Consultants India Limited (TCIL) is a central public sector undertaking. It is under the ownership of the Department of Telecommunications, Ministry of Communications, Government of India. It was set up in 1978 to give consultations in fields of Telecommunications to developing countries around the world. Started with an initial investment of 10lakh. TCIL is present in almost 80 countries, mainly in the Middle East, Africa and Europe.

It has executed E-governance projects, GSM systems, optical fibre on power transmission lines, VSAT networks and radio trunking projects. It diversified into civil works also. In 2012, the standalone net worth of the company was 420 crore. It is a Miniratna company under the Ministry of Communications & IT. In 2010-2011 financial year, the turnover of the company was 1833 crore.

Pan-African e-Network project for Tele-medicine and Tele-education was implemented by the company on a turnkey basis. It provides training activities in the field of Telecomm and IT. TCIL has 959 employees as on 25 June 2021.

== Joint ventures ==
- The company holds 30% share in Bharti Hexacom, a joint venture with Bharti Airtel. In September 2014, it announced its plan to sell this stake by mid 2015 to raise funds.
- It has a presence in Kenya through a joint venture with Airtel Kenya.
- In Saudi Arabia it has presence through a joint venture with NESMA group.
- Tamil Nadu Telecommunications Ltd in Tamil Nadu is a joint venture between TCIL and TIDCO. It manufactures Optical fiber cable and does cable laying business.
- In Palestine it has a presence through a joint venture with BellSouth International. It provides Telecom Software services
- In collaboration with DSIIDC, it has formed Intelligent Communication Systems India Limited an IT service and solution provider.

== TCIL Across The Globe ==
TCIL has been executing Telecommunication Works in Various parts of the world which include Kingdom of Saudi Arabia, Kuwait, Oman, Mauritius, Nepal, Afghanistan and Bhutan. The work includes Implementation and Maintenance of Fiber Optic Network. Currently TCIL has mega projects in maintenance in Kingdom of Saudi Arabia which includes Saudi National Fiber Network costing around 10 million Saudi Riyal annually. TCIL is diversifying its field in IT sector also with many projects running in African Countries namely Senegal and Nigeria.

== See also ==
- Communications in India
- The Telecom Commercial Communication Customer Preference Regulations, 2010
