= Oriental Telephone Company =

Telecommunications company

- Industry: Telephony
- Founded: January 25, 1881; 145 years ago
- Founder: Anglo-Indian Telephone Company, Ltd; Oriental Bell Telephone Company of New York
- Defunct: 1948
- Fate: Dissolved

The Oriental Telephone Company was established on January 25, 1881, as the result of an agreement between Thomas Edison, Alexander Graham Bell, the Oriental Bell Telephone Company of New York and the Anglo-Indian Telephone Company, Ltd. The company was licensed to sell telephones in Greece, Turkey, South Africa, India, Japan, China, and other Asian countries.
