= Telecom Regulatory Authority of India =

Indian telecommunications regulator

- भारतीय दूरसंचार विनियामक प्राधिकरण
- TRAI Logo

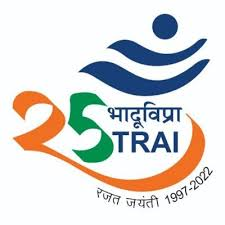
- TRAI complete 25 year logo

Regulatory agency overview
- Formed: 20 February 1997; 29 years ago
- Jurisdiction: Department of Telecommunications, Ministry of Communications, Government of India
- Headquarters: 4th, 5th, 6th & 7th Floor, Tower-F, World Trade Centre, Nauroji Nagar, New Delhi: 110029
- Regulatory agency executives: Anil Kumar Lahoti, IRSE, Chairperson; Atul Chaudhary, ITS, Secretary
- Key document: The TRAI Act, 1997
- Website: trai.gov.in

The Telecom Regulatory Authority of India (TRAI) is a regulatory agency set up by the Government of India under section 3 of the Telecom Regulatory Authority of India Act, 1997. It is the regulator of the telecommunications sector in India. It consists of a chairperson and not more than two full-time members and not more than two part-time members. The TRAI Act was amended by an ordinance, effective from 24 January 2000, establishing a Telecom Disputes Settlement and Appellate Tribunal to take over the adjudicatory and disputes functions from TRAI.

== History ==
Telecom Regulatory Authority of India was established on 20 February 1997 by an Act of Parliament to regulate telecom services and tariffs in India. Before this, regulation of telecom services and tariffs was overseen by the Central Government.

TRAI's mission is to create and nurture conditions for the growth of telecommunications in India to enable the country to have a leading role in the emerging global information society.

One of its main objectives is to provide a fair and transparent environment that promotes a level playing field and facilitates fair competition in the market. TRAI regularly issues orders and directions on various subjects such as tariffs, interconnections, quality of service, direct to home services and mobile number portability.

In January 2016, TRAI introduced an important change in telecommunication to the benefit of consumers, where they would be compensated ₹1 (equivalent to ₹2.00 or 2.1¢ US in 2026) for every dropped call, subject to a maximum of three dropped calls in a day. In May 2016, this regulation was revoked by the Supreme Court on the grounds of being "unreasonable, arbitrary and unconstitutional".

=== Secretariat ===
TRAI is administered through a secretariat headed by a secretary. All proposals are processed by the secretary, who organises the agenda for authority meetings (consulting with the chairperson), prepares the minutes and issues regulations in accordance to the meetings. The secretary is assisted by advisors. These include Mobile Network, Interconnection and FixeNetwork, BroadBand and Policy Analysis, Quality of Service, Broadcasting & Cable Services, Economic Regulation, Financial Analysis & IFA, Legal, Consumer Affairs & International Relation and Administration & Personnel. Officers are selected from the Indian Telecommunications Service and the Indian Administrative Service (IAS).

=== List of Chairpersons (Telecom Regulatory Authority of India) ===
List of Chairpersons:

No.	Name	Tenure	
1	Justice (Retd.) S. S. Sodhi	1997	2000
2	M. S. Verma	2000	2003
3	Pradip Baijal	2003	2006
4	Nripendra Misra	2006	2009
5	Dr. J. S. Sarma	2009	2012
6	Rahul Khullar	2012	2015
7	Ram Sewak Sharma	2015	2020
8	Dr. P. D. Vaghela	2020	2023
9	Anil Kumar Lahoti, IRSE	2024	2028

=== TRAI Mobile Apps ===
On 6 June 2017, TRAI launched three new apps and a web portal to highlight the telecom services that are being offered to the users.

The Mycall, MySpeed, and Do Not Disturb (DND 2.0) apps can be used to ensure that there is transparency between what consumers are paying for and what telecom operators are promising to provide at a certain rate.

In December 2018, TRAI released another app called TRAI Channel Selector. Using this app, they can add, remove and manage their channels.

=== Recent TRAI initiatives ===
In order to increase broadband penetration in India, TRAI has proposed WANI (Wi-Fi Access Network Interface) architecture. If implemented, it may lead to set up of Public Data Offices (PDOs) where Wi-FI Internet would be available on demand. TRAI relates the same with PCOs which were used to do the voice calls and were very popular hotspots before the mobile phones or home landlines became the ultimate mode of communication.

In September 2026, TRAI issued the Telecom Consumers Protection (Thirteenth Amendment) Regulations, 2026, requiring telecom operators to offer special tariff vouchers (STVs) for voice calls and SMS only, at a reduced cost, for every validity period at which they already offer bundled STVs combining data, voice and SMS. The amendment applies to vouchers with a validity of 30 days or less and requires operators to offer at least one voice-and-SMS-only STV with a validity of more than 30 days. The regulation takes effect 30 days after its gazette notification.

== TRAI reports ==
To increase transparency and give a data-based overview of Indian Telecom Industry at regular intervals, TRAI publishes multiple reports under Release/Publication "Reports" section on its website.

== Controversies and Criticism ==
=== Jio ===
The TRAI has been accused of bending its rules multiple times to let Jio, a subsidiary of Reliance Industries Limited, become a market leader in the span of a few years. Jio was allowed to "test" its services for a much longer period and with a much larger subscriber base than was the industrial norm. In a letter to the telecom department, Rajan Mathews of the Cellular Operators Association of India wrote that Reliance's offers were "full-blown and full-fledged services masquerading as tests, which bypass regulations and can potentially game policy features." TRAI was also accused of modifying its definition of "significant market power" so as to exclude Jio from strict scrutiny. Whilst initially the definition of market power was based on total network activity, the parameters were changed to subscriber share and gross revenue. Jio qualified as a significant market power according to the first definition, but not the second.

=== Airport Wi-fi Access Regulations ===
The TRAI has been criticized for making Wi-Fi difficult to access at airports across India. As per several TRAI officials, Wi-Fi access across airports, that requires a pin through phone numbers, has been cited due to security reasons and KYC (know your customer) requirements, and limited accessibility for 45 minutes. The system has been slammed by several domestic and international travelers due to inconvenience to international passengers, limited timeframe to use and complicated access. Despite criticism and negative reviews posted by travelers on Skytrax and Tripadvisor, the TRAI and Airports Authority of India have consistently refused to change the rules and justified citing security, which have affected ratings of both domestic and international airports across the country when compared to other nations.

== See also ==
- Telecommunications in India
- The Telecom Commercial Communication Customer Preference Regulations, 2010
- TRAI Sim closure fraud
