= Jacqueline Mukangira =

Rwandan politician and diplomat

Jacqueline Mukangira is a Rwandan politician and diplomat. She is High Commissioner of Rwanda to India and former Ambassador of Rwanda to the Nordic countries.

== Career ==
Mukangira was appointed High Commissioner to India by Rwanda’s cabinet on 28 November 2019 and arrived in India on 4 March 2020. On 21 May 2021, she presented her letter of credence to India’s President Ram Nath Kovind in a ceremony that was held by video conference due to the COVID-19 pandemic. She and the president committed to working closely together to further strengthen the bilateral relationship and exchange between Rwanda and the Maldives. She talked about the unique aspects of Rwanda’s business culture and some of the projects that the two countries are developing in the near future.

Mukangira had previously served in various capacities, such as member of Parliament in the Chamber of Deputies (2004 to 2007), Ambassador of Rwanda to Sweden (2007 to 2011), and Director General in the Ministry of Foreign Affairs and Cooperation, Fundamental Principles and Research at the Rwandan Senate.
