= Post Office Act, 2023 =

Proposed Indian postage reform

Parliament of India
- Long title: An Act to consolidate and amend the law relating to Post Office in India and to provide for matters connected therewith or incidental thereto.
- Citation: Act No. 43 of 2023
- Territorial extent: India
- Passed by: Rajya Sabha
- Passed: 4 December 2023
- Passed by: Lok Sabha
- Passed: 18 December 2023
- Assented to by: President Droupadi Murmu
- Assented to: 24 December 2023
- Commenced: 18 June 2024

Legislative history

Initiating chamber: Rajya Sabha
- Bill title: Post Office Bill, 2023
- Bill citation: Bill No. LVIII of 2023
- Introduced by: Ashwini Vaishnaw, Minister of Railways, Communications & Electronics and Information Technology
- Introduced: 10 August 2023
- Passed: 4 December 2023

Revising chamber: Lok Sabha
- Passed: 18 December 2023

Repeals
- Indian Post Office Act, 1898 (6 of 1898)
- Status: In force

The Post Office Act, 2023 is an act of the Parliament of India to consolidate and amend the law relating to Post Office in India along with the expansion and modernization of its services. The Act replaces the Indian Post Office Act of 1898. The Post Office Bill, 2023 was introduced in Rajya Sabha on 10 August 2023. The evolution of India Post to include delivery of diverse citizen-centric services through its network has prompted for bringing this new bill in the Parliament.

The bill was supposed to be taken up for discussion in Lok Sabha during the Parliament Special Session, 2023.

== Features ==
- Modernization and Expansion: The act envisions a transformed India Post, venturing beyond traditional mail delivery to offer financial services like banking and insurance, and playing a bigger role in e-commerce delivery. This could potentially boost revenue, create jobs, and improve efficiency.
- Central Government Oversight: The act grants the central government greater control over India Post. This includes the power to appoint the Director General, issue directives, and influence strategic decisions. While some see this as streamlining bureaucracy, others fear it might stifle the organization's autonomy and responsiveness to local needs.
- Interception of Postal Articles: A controversial aspect of the act empowers the government to intercept and detain postal articles for reasons of national security, public order, or preventing illegal activities. This raises concerns about potential misuse of this power and violation of individual privacy.
- Liability Exemptions: The act exempts post officers from liability for loss, misdelivery, delay, or damage to postal articles, except in specific cases. While intended to protect officers from frivolous lawsuits, critics argue it might reduce accountability and incentivize negligence.

The Indian Post Office Act, 1898 requires Parliament nod for modification of fees charged for all services provided by postal establishments. The Post Office Act, 2023 provides necessary flexibility to the postal department in determining the prices of its services within a highly competitive domestic courier industry and facilitates prompt responsiveness to dynamic market demands.

The Act stipulates that postage stamps shall be issued in accordance with the regulations established by the central government. Additionally, the Act specifies that the Post Office shall hold the sole authority to release postage stamps. Pursuant to this legislation, a Post Office official is authorized to scrutinize a consignment if there is a reasonable suspicion that it comprises restricted items or items that are subject to duty payment.

The Act delineates a range of transgressions and corresponding sanctions. For example, the act of stealing, misusing, or damaging postal items by a Post Office employee is subject to a maximum of seven years' imprisonment and a monetary penalty. Any unpaid or disregarded sums by a user may be retrieved as overdue land revenue.

The introduced legislation confers authority upon the central government, which possesses the ability to empower any officer through notification, to intercept, open, or detain any item in the process of transmission by the Post Office. This action is taken in the interest of safeguarding the security of the State, fostering amicable relations with foreign states, maintaining public order, responding to emergencies, or ensuring public safety. Additionally, such interception, opening, or detention may be carried out in response to any violation of the provisions outlined in this Act.

== Reactions ==
The lack of clear safeguards surrounding government interception powers fuels fears of mass surveillance and erosion of individual privacy. Transparency and robust oversight mechanisms are crucial to address these concerns.

The Liability exemptions for post officers might create a sense of impunity and discourage accountability for service quality issues. Balancing protection for officers with ensuring responsible service delivery is key.

It has also raised concerns on centralization issue as the increased central government control might stifle the autonomy and responsiveness of India Post. This could lead to a disconnect from local needs and hinder effective service delivery in diverse regions across India.
