= Pradip Baijal =

Former Telecom Secretary of India

Pradip Baijal IAS (Retd.)

Personal details
- Born: 15 February 1943 (age 83)
- Children: 2
- Education: (B.Tech) IIT Roorkee

Pradip Baijal is a retired Indian Administrative Service officer (IAS) who served as the Chairman of the Telecom Regulatory Authority of India and also as the Telecom Secretary of India.

== Education ==
He was trained as an engineer before he joined the Indian Administrative Service. Baijal earned his BE (Honours) in Mechanical Engineering from University of Roorkee; now renamed the Indian Institute of Technology, Roorkee. He took part in a one-year visiting fellowship at the University of Oxford on the Privatisation of Public Enterprise.

== Career ==
Baijal held several senior administrative positions in the Ministry of Finance and Industries at state level but first came into prominence as the disinvestment secretary in 1999 and was part of the team that was involved in the disinvestment of various Govt companies like BP, VSNL, IPCL and Maruti. He is credited for the sale of Maruti which resulted in a Rs 1000 crore control premium for the government). He retired as the Chairman of the Telecom Regulatory Authority of India (TRAI) in March 2006.

Baijal pushed for unified licensing, under which an operator can offer telecom and broadcasting services on a single licence and next generation networks for Indian telecom sector that would bring down the network costs significantly. He is credited with suggesting a reduction in ADC, a fee that private operators pay BSNL for compensating its rural operations, and its eventual withdrawal by 2009.

Baijal has trained telecom regulators on behalf of the World Bank (Infodev) in Africa. He similarly works for ITU in Southeast Asia and has also undertaken restructuring of telecom regulation in Lao, Myanmar, and Oman, and has lectured ministers and regulators in Southeast Asia on reforms and regulation. He had also taken training classes on power regulation in 1999, in Vietnam. He is on the boards of Nestle, GVK, and Patni Computers, and advisory boards of the India Oil Corporation, Infrastructure Development Finance Company. For a few months in 2009, he was the chairman of an advisory committee to the Petroleum and Natural Gas Regulatory Board in India. He was Chairman of the Telecom Regulatory Authority of India (TRAI).

== Post-retirement ==
Baijal spent a year after retirement writing the book Disinvestment in India - I Lose and you Gain, published by Pearsons He also co-founded a strategy consulting firm Noesis with Niira Radia. He also serves on the boards of GVK, Nestle India and Patni Computers. He works as an independent consultant and advisor to several countries including Laos, Myanmar and Cambodia. He has recently self-published a book and released it on Amazon. "This is an honest account of the journey of one of India's finest civil servants .... and it is a clarion call to stop the witch hunt practices, otherwise Baijal might just be the last of his tribe to have the courage to carry out big and bold reforms. The India of today cannot afford this. " - Mr. Deepak Parekh
