= Pan-African e-Network project =

ICT project

The Pan-African e-Network project is an information and communications technology (ICT) project between India and the African Union that seeks to connect the 55 member states of the Union through a satellite and fibre-optic network to India and to each other to enable access to and sharing of expertise between India and African states in the areas of tele-education, telemedicine, Voice over IP, infotainment, resource mapping, meteorological services, e-governance and e-commerce services. The project is often described as Africa's biggest ever in the ICT sector and is expected to extend ICT infrastructure to rural and previously underserved areas. The project is seen as an example of India furthering its economic and strategic interests in Africa through the use of soft diplomacy and has been acclaimed as an instance of South–South cooperation, helping to overcome the digital divide in Africa.

== History ==
The idea for the project came from the then President of India, A P J Abdul Kalam who proposed such a network during his address to the Pan-African Parliament in Johannesburg in 2004. The Government of India decided to support the idea and gave the project a funding of $100 million in 2007. The entire cost of the project, amounting to ₹540 crores ($125 million) is to be borne by the Government of India through a grant.

The first phase of the project was launched on 26 February 2009 by the then Minister of External Affairs Pranab Mukherjee and included the 11 countries of Sudan, Rwanda, Benin, Burkina Faso, Gabon, the Gambia, Ghana, Ethiopia, Mauritius, Nigeria, Senegal and Seychelles. The second phase of the project that covers 12 countries- Botswana, Burundi, Cote d’Ivoire, Djibouti, Egypt, Eritrea, Libya, Malawi, Mozambique, Somalia, Uganda and Zambia- was launched in 2010 by the Minister of External Affairs, S M Krishna. 47 African countries have joined the project out of which implementation in 34 were completed by 2010 and the remaining were to be completed by the end of 2011.

The second phase of the project called e-VidyaBharti (Tele-education) and e-ArogyaBharti (Tele-medicine) was launched on 7 October 2019.

== Infrastructure ==
The e-network is made up of a large undersea communications cable network and satellite connectivity provided through C-Band transponders of the Intelsat-904 or RASCOM satellites. A Hub Earth Station of the project, located in Senegal, is connected to the participant universities and super specialty hospitals, through an International Private Leased Circuit (IPLC) that links it to a submarine cable landing station in India. Each partner nation from Africa has a tele-education terminal, a telemedicine terminal and a VVIP communication node for the head of State linked to the network. The network, designed to have 169 terminals and a central hub that delivers services, uses state of the art technology that is compatible with broadband technologies like Wi-Fi and WiMax. The network can also be scaled up to support increases in user numbers and to cater to different applications. The project is being implemented by the Telecommunications Consultants India Limited (TCIL) which is responsible for the project's design, operationalisation and maintenance. A data centre at its office in New Delhi acts as a hub for all Indian sites. As a precursor to e-Network project, a pilot project was successfully undertaken in Ethiopia in 2006 that provided education services from IGNOU at New Delhi and telemedicine services from CARE Hospital, Hyderabad.

== Institutional partners ==
The project links 7 Indian and 5 African universities, 12 Indian and 5 African super-specialty hospitals and 53 telemedicine and tele-education centres in Africa. The Indian educational institutions partnering in the project are Amity University, Noida, University of Madras, Indira Gandhi National Open University, Birla Institute of Technology and Science and the University of Delhi. The All India Institute of Medical Sciences, the Escorts Heart Research Centre and Moolchand Hospital, New Delhi, Apollo Hospitals and Sri Ramchandra Medical College and Research Centre, Chennai, Care Hospitals in Hyderabad, Amrita Institute of Medical Sciences, Kochi, Narayana Hrudayalaya and Health Care Global Hospital, Bengaluru, KEM Hospital, Mumbai, Fortis Hospital, Noida and Sanjay Gandhi Postgraduate Institute of Medical Sciences are the Indian medical service providers partnering in the project. From Africa, the Makerere University, Kwame Nkrumah University of Science and Technology, University of Yaounde, Cameroon, Ebadan Hospital, Nigeria and the Brazzaville Hospital in the Congo are partners in the project.

== Achievements ==
The Pan African e-Network project aims to benefit 10,000 students over a period of 5 years under certificate, graduate and post graduate courses. The project will help transfer skills to African nations especially through Continuing Medical Education (CME) programmes that will help train doctors and nurses in remote centres in Africa. The response to the project in Africa has been enthusiastic with tele-education and telemedicine facilities allowing for access to Indian expertise in these fields in a cost-effective manner. The success of the Pan African e-Network project prompted Prime Minister Manmohan Singh to propose the establishment of an India-Africa Virtual University during the India-Africa Forum Summit at Addis Ababa in 2011. The project won the Hermes Prize for Innovation awarded by the European Institute of Creative Strategies and Innovation in 2010.

== See also ==
- Indian Technical and Economic Cooperation Programme
