= The Telecom Commercial Communication Customer Preference Regulations, 2010 =

Indian telecommunications regulation

Telecom Regulatory Authority of India
- Long title: An Act to respite customers from pesky marketing calls and SMS
- Citation: THE TELECOM COMMERCIAL COMMUNICATIONS CUSTOMER PREFERENCE REGULATIONS, 2010
- Territorial extent: Whole of India
- Enacted by: Telecom Regulatory Authority of India
- Enacted: 18 January 2010
- Commenced: 27 September 2011

Amended by
- The Telecom Commercial Communications Customer Preference (Twelfth Amendment) Regulations, 2013

The Telecom Commercial Communication Customer Preference Regulations, 2010 (TCCCPR) is a Regulation by Telecom Regulatory Authority of India, enacted in 2010, came into force from 27 September 2011. The regulation was launched by Telecom minister of India Kapil Sibal which enables people across India to respite from pesky marketing calls and SMS.

== Background ==
The Indian telecom Industry with nearly 900 million subscribers is the second largest wireless market in the world. Low tariffs and direct reach to consumers has made SMS and direct calling one of the most cost effective ways of selling services and products. However, telemarketing has become a major irritant to customers over few years.

== Regulation ==
- Subscribers can opt for 'fully blocked' category where all commercial calls/SMS will be blocked, he/she may also opt for 'partially blocked' category to receive various promotional SMS.
- Hefty penalty of up to ₹2.5 lakh (US$3,000) on erring telemarketing companies and blacklisting of habitual offenders.
- No commercial communication, even for unregistered customers, shall be sent between 9.00 p.m. and 9.00 a.m., Only for Monday to Saturday.No telemarketing calls allowed on National holidays.so that customers are not disturbed.

=== 200 SMS a day ===
To make it difficult to broadcast millions of SMSs in a day, restriction on more than 100 SMS per SIM per day were introduced. TRAI directed all access providers to exclude the following persons from the limit of one hundred SMS per day per SIM. The exceptions include:

- No limitation of number of SMS's of festival days per SIM
- Dealers of telecom operators
- e-Ticketing agencies
- Social networking sites

However, 100 SMS a day plan proved to be disastrous for text addicts wring hands. According to a survey conducted by the Associated Chambers of Commerce and Industry of India, around 60% of the country's urban youth send/receive around 100-125 text messages daily to interact with their peer group. College students were hard hit by the new norms as they are the biggest users of the SMS as they are available at low cost tariffs. Owing to certain representations by service providers and consumers to increase the limit of 100 SMSes, TRAI had later decided to increase the limit of 100 SMSes per day per sim to 200 SMSes per day per Sim.

In July 2012, the Delhi High Court removed the ban on the SMS limit of 200 per day per sim, as it felt that the restriction infringed the constitutional right to freedom of speech and expression.

=== Freedom from disturbing calls ===
- All telemarketing calls will start with 140, to identify the call's origin
- Telemarketing calls and SMSes will be barred from 9 pm to 9 am for everyone
- Customers can block such calls fully or partially by calling up 1909
- Telecom firms will act against violation within 7 days of the compliant and inform the complainant

=== Penalties for telemarketers ===
- ₹25,000 (US$300) for the first offence by telemarketer
- ₹75,000 (US$890) for the second violation
- ₹80,000 (US$950) for the third violation
- ₹1.25 lakh (US$1,500) lakh for the fourth violation
- ₹1.5 lakh (US$1,800) lakh for the fifth violation
- ₹2 lakh (US$2,400) for the sixth violation, after which the telemarketer's number will be blocked

=== Penalties for telecom firms ===
- Rs 10 lakh fine on service providers that violate mobile users 'Do Not Call' instructions for four times

== See also ==
- Telecommunications in India
