= Joint secretary to the Government of India =

Post under the General Staffing Scheme

Union Joint Secretary
- Kendrīya Sanyukt Sachiv
- Emblem of India

- Flag of India
- Government of India
- Reports to: Additional Secretary; Secretary; Parliament of India; Council of Ministers of India; Prime Minister of India
- Seat: Union Ministries of India; Secretariat Building, New Delhi
- Appointer: Appointments Committee of the Cabinet
- Term length: (Term can be extended).
- Formation: 1920; 106 years ago (Note: The rank of Joint Secretary to the Government of India was officially created in 1921, as part of the post‑1919 reforms. However, the role was already operational informally in 1920, with ICS officers like George Gall Sim serving in that capacity prior to formal codification.)
- Succession: 26th (on the Indian order of precedence.)
- Salary: ₹144,200 (US$1,500) - ₹218,200 (US$2,300) monthly
- Website: Official Website

Joint Secretary to the Government of India (often abbreviated as JS, GoI or Union Joint Secretary or Joint Secretary to Union of India) is a post under the Central Staffing Scheme and the third highest non-political executive rank in the Government of India. The authority for creation of this post solely rests with the Cabinet of India.

Joint secretary is mostly a career civil servant and is a government official of high seniority. The civil servants who hold this rank and post are either from All India Services or Central Civil Services. All promotions and appointments to this rank and post are directly made by the Appointments Committee of the Cabinet.

In the functioning of the Government of India, a joint secretary is the administrative head of a wing in a department. Joint secretaries in the Union Government is analogous to Major General and equivalent ranks in the Indian Armed Forces and are listed as such in the Order of Precedence. In the Department of Military Affairs of the Ministry of Defence, an officer from all the three armed forces of the rank of Major General and equivalent is currently appointed (Note: See Vikram Menon.) and designated as Joint Secretary (Army/Navy/AirForce).

The Special Protection Group is sometimes headed by an Inspector General rank holder, who is designated as Joint Secretary (Security) in the Cabinet Secretariat. Joint secretaries (GOI) rank 26th on Order of Precedence of India.

== History ==
The post of joint secretary in the Government of India was created in the 1920s. The salary of a member in this rank and post was fixed at Rs. 36,000 per annum in the 1930s. The salaries of Joint Secretary in Government of India during the British Raj was same to the Chief Secretary of United Provinces of Agra and Oudh, Punjab and Burma. (Note: As per published records and book named "The India List and India Office List 1905" as published by India Office and India Office Records.) As per Warrant of Precedence of 1905, joint secretaries in the Government of India were listed together with secretaries to the Government of India and ranked above of chief secretaries of provincial governments.

During the majority of the British period, particularly between 1920 and 1940, the position of Joint Secretary to the Government of India functioned as the second-highest rank within central departments, subordinate only to Secretary to the Government of India. By the mid-1940s, the designation of Additional Secretary was introduced in select departments, but was not yet universal.

In 1937, the Central Secretariat contained only seven joint secretaries, who were members of the Imperial Civil Service and other services. However, by 1946, the number had increased to twenty-five.

Before Partition of India, in 1946, Iskander Mirza was elevated as Joint Secretary at the Ministry of Defence in New Delhi, who later went onto become 1st President of Pakistan. In 1920, George Gall Sim served as Joint Secretary in the Finance Department to assist with major financial administrative reforms. In 1936, Tennant Sloan served as Joint Secretary in Home Department. (Note: See 1936 New Year Honours.) In 1919, Henry Smith served as Joint Secretary in the Legislative Department. Hawthorne Lewis was appointed as Joint Secretary in the Reforms Office.

According to A. D. Gorwala, ICS, "The joint secretaries ought to in reality be what the name implies, namely secretaries for the subject entrusted to them and joined to a more senior secretary for the convenience of administrative work." Sir Richard Tottenham, ICS had once expressed "In my opinion there is, or should be, no distinction of function, but only of pay between a joint and an additional Secretary. Additional and joint secretaries should not be either cheap secretaries or expensive deputy secretaries."

=== Prime Minister's Office ===
During the tenure of Jawaharlal Nehru as the prime minister, the then Prime Minister's Secretariat was headed by a joint secretary. Currently, in Prime Minister's Office (India), the private secretary(ies) to Prime Minister of India is always in the rank and post of Joint Secretary to Government of India.

== Tenure and Appointment ==
=== Tenure ===
A member of All India Services is appointed to this rank and post only on tenure. This tenure is a deputation to the Central Government and is fixed for 5 years, after which they are sent back to their own parent cadre.

A member of Central Civil Services is appointed to this rank and post as per vacancy in their own service cadre and are empanelled.

=== Appointment ===
In 2020, Ministry of Personnel, Public Grievances and Pensions memorandum stated that Appointments Committee of the Cabinet has directed that not less than two years experience at deputy secretary/director (GOI) level under the Central Staffing Scheme shall be mandatory for empanelment at joint secretary level (GOI) at the Centre in respect of IAS officers from 2007 batch.

== Powers, responsibilities and postings ==
The organizational structure of a department of the Government of India.

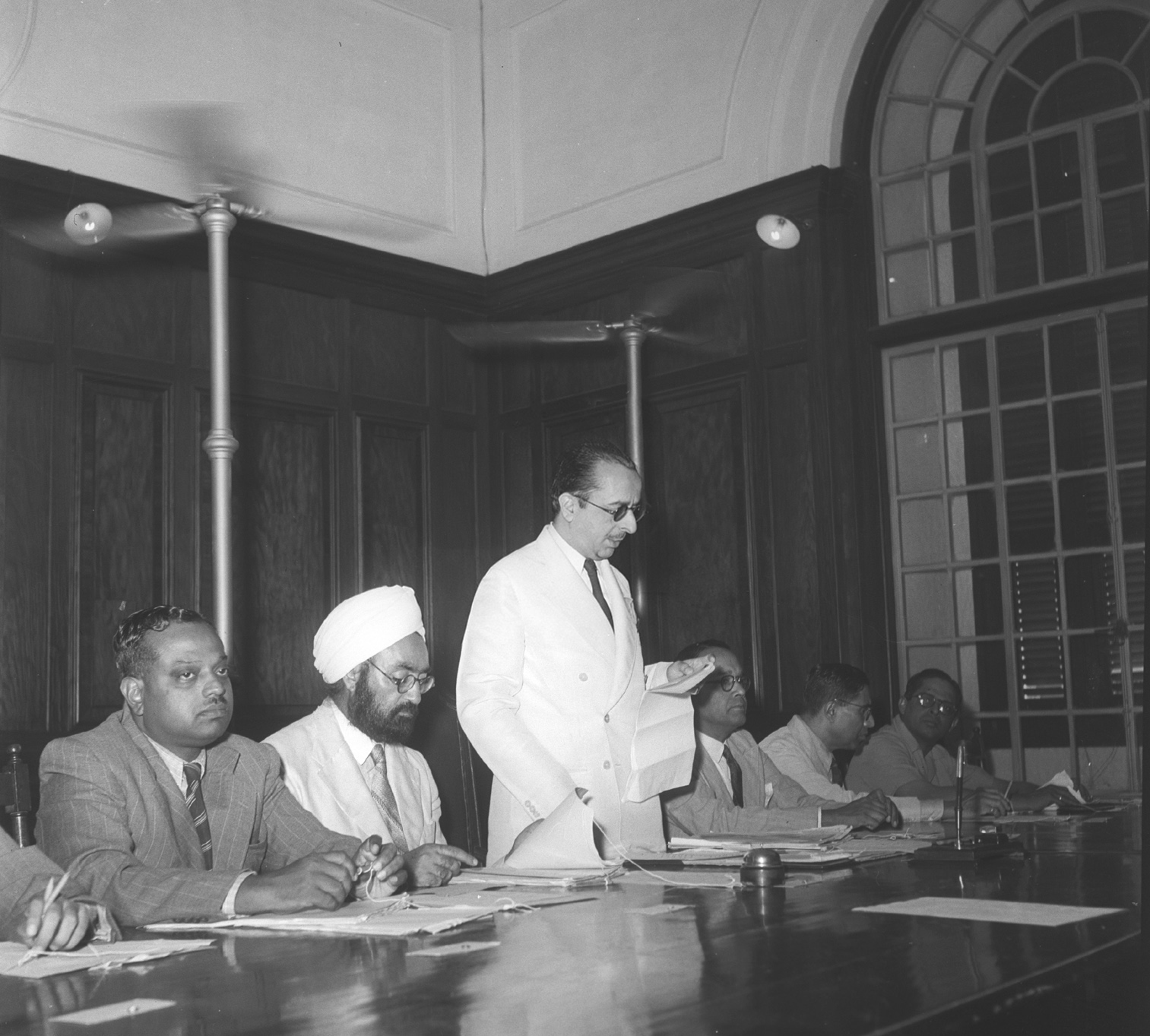
C. H. Bhabha with a Secretary and a few Joint Secretaries to Government of India in 1947.

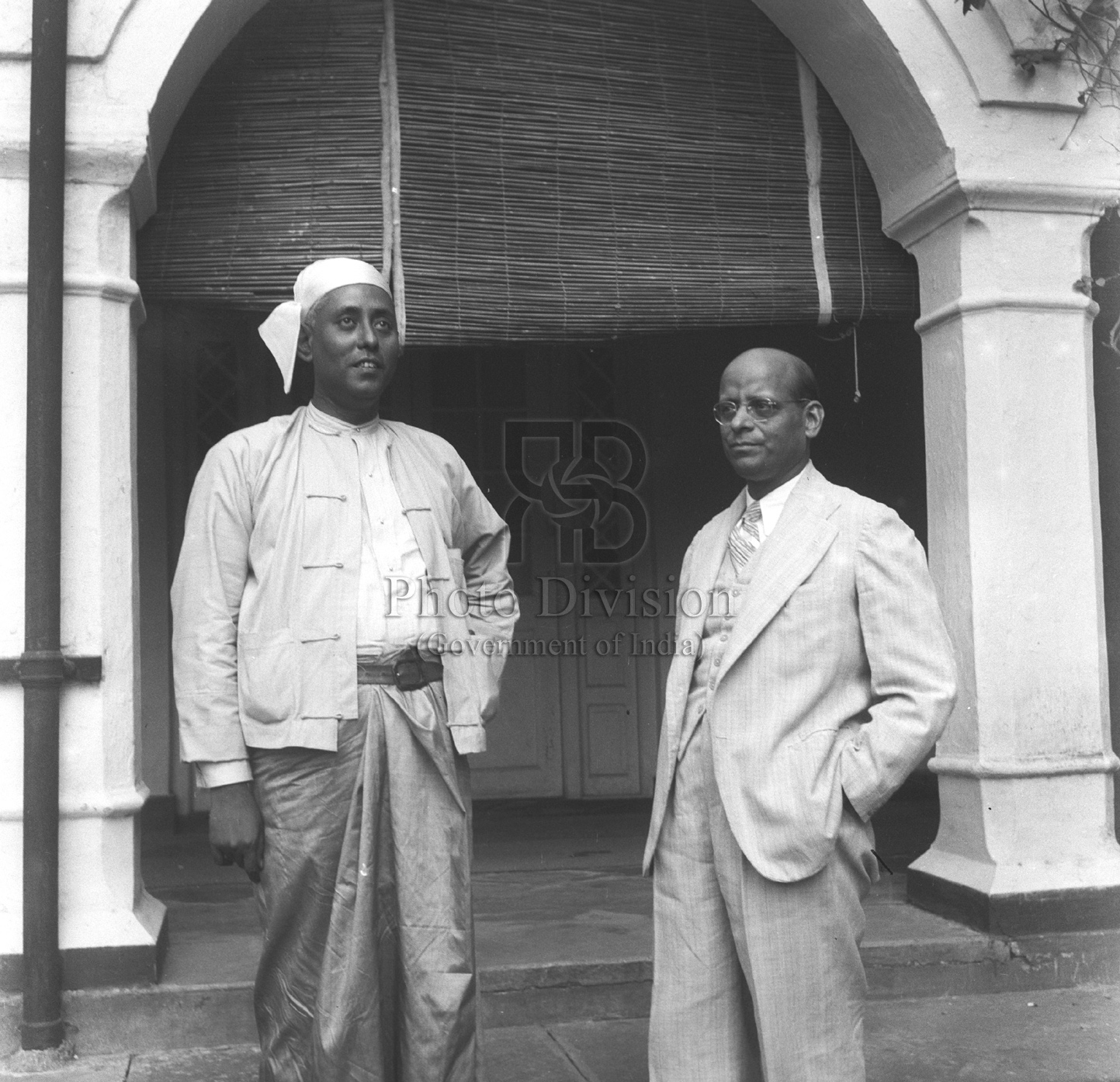
U. Win with a Joint Secretary to Government of India in 1947.

Joint secretary is the overall in charge with the necessary measure of independent functioning and responsibility of the wing of the department allocated and entrusted to him. A joint secretary in charge of Administration also exercises all administrative powers as head of the department wing of the ministry/department.

The Prime Minister of India is the final authority on posting and transfer of officers of joint secretary level.

=== Reporting ===
Joint secretaries report to their divisional/departmental additional secretary, departmental secretary and ministerial/departmental cabinet minister. In 2023, Government of India empowered all Joint secretaries to the Government of India to report directly to Secretary to Government of India, to increase efficiency in decision-making.

== Position ==
=== Union/Central Government of India ===
In the Union government, the members head department wings in the departments and ministries of the Union government, and hold positions such as chief vigilance officer (CVO), chief administrative officer (CAO), Registrar General and Census Commissioner of India, Director General of Civil Aviation of India, director general of National Literacy Mission Authority, economic advisers, advisors of TRAI, Joint Directors of CBI, additional directors general (AIR and Doordarshan), board members of Staff Selection Commission of India commissioners of Taxes and Police, chief engineers in central departments.

They also hold the post of Social Secretary and Press Secretary to President of India.

Government nominated board members in the Central Public Sector Enterprises/Public Sector Undertakings are either of the rank of additional secretary or joint secretary.

=== State Government(s) of India ===
A Principal Secretary or Divisional Commissioner in a state government can be deputed/posted as Joint Secretary in the center

=== Union Territory of India ===
A person who is empanelled as Joint Secretary in the Central Government can also hold the position of the Chief Secretary/Administrator of a Union Territory.

== International deputations ==
In the Ministry of External Affairs, the posting in the rank and post of Ambassador / Deputy Chief of Mission to a Diplomatic mission begins at the rank of Joint Secretary to the Government of India in the Indian Foreign Service. The post of Deputy Permanent Representative of India to the UN and Official Spokesperson of the Ministry of External Affairs is a holder of this rank in federal government.

On deputation, Joint Secretary (GOI) can hold senior positions at the United Nations, such as India's permanent representative to UNESCO, Conference on Disarmament.

== International equivalency ==
The rank of Joint Secretary in Government of India is analogous and equivalent to Assistant Secretary or Under Secretary in the federal government of the United States. (Note: As per rank-post analogous and equivalent to Major General in Armed Forces.) The rank is equivalent to Director (Note: In Civil Service (United Kingdom), Director (SCS Pay Band 2) in equivanet to Major General in British Armed Forces.) in Senior Civil Service of His Majesty's Home Civil Service. (Note: As per rank-post analogous and equivalent to Major General in Armed Forces.)

In Government of Pakistan the position would be equivalent to rank of Additional Secretary (BS-21) (Note: See and refer to Government employees in Pakistan. As per rank-post analogous and equivalent to Major General in Armed Forces.) and Additional Secretary (Grade 3) in Government of Bangladesh. (Note: As per rank-post analogous and equivalent to Major General in Armed Forces.)

== Emolument, accommodation and perks ==
An Indian Diplomatic Passport and an Official Passport generally issued to Joint Secretary (GOI).

All joint secretaries to the Government of India are entitled to a diplomatic passport. They are allotted Type-V (D-II and D-I) and Type-VI (C-II) apartments in areas like New Moti Bagh across Delhi by Ministry of Urban Development's Directorate of Estates.

The salary and emolument in this rank is equivalent to Major General and equivalent ranks in Indian Armed Forces.

Joint Secretary, GoI monthly pay and allowances
Base Salary as per 7th Pay Commission (Per month)	Level on Pay Matrix	Sources
₹144,200 (US$1,500) (Minimum Pay) to ₹218,200 (US$2,300) (Maximum Pay)	Level 14	

=== Personal Staff ===
All Joint Secretaries to the Government of India are entitled to an official car and a Principal Private Secretary (PPS) as a staff member while serving the post in Union Ministries of India.

== Reforms and challenges ==
Non-IAS civil services have complained to Government of India because of lack of empanelment in the rank/post of joint secretary on numerous occasions. As per the Seventh Central Pay Commission of India, IAS officers held 249 out of 341 positions of Joint Secretary in the Government of India. In 2021, as per media reports the share of IAS at Joint Secretary in Government of India has fallen to 33%. Since 2017–18, IAS officers holding JS rank have now become a minority in almost all central government offices.

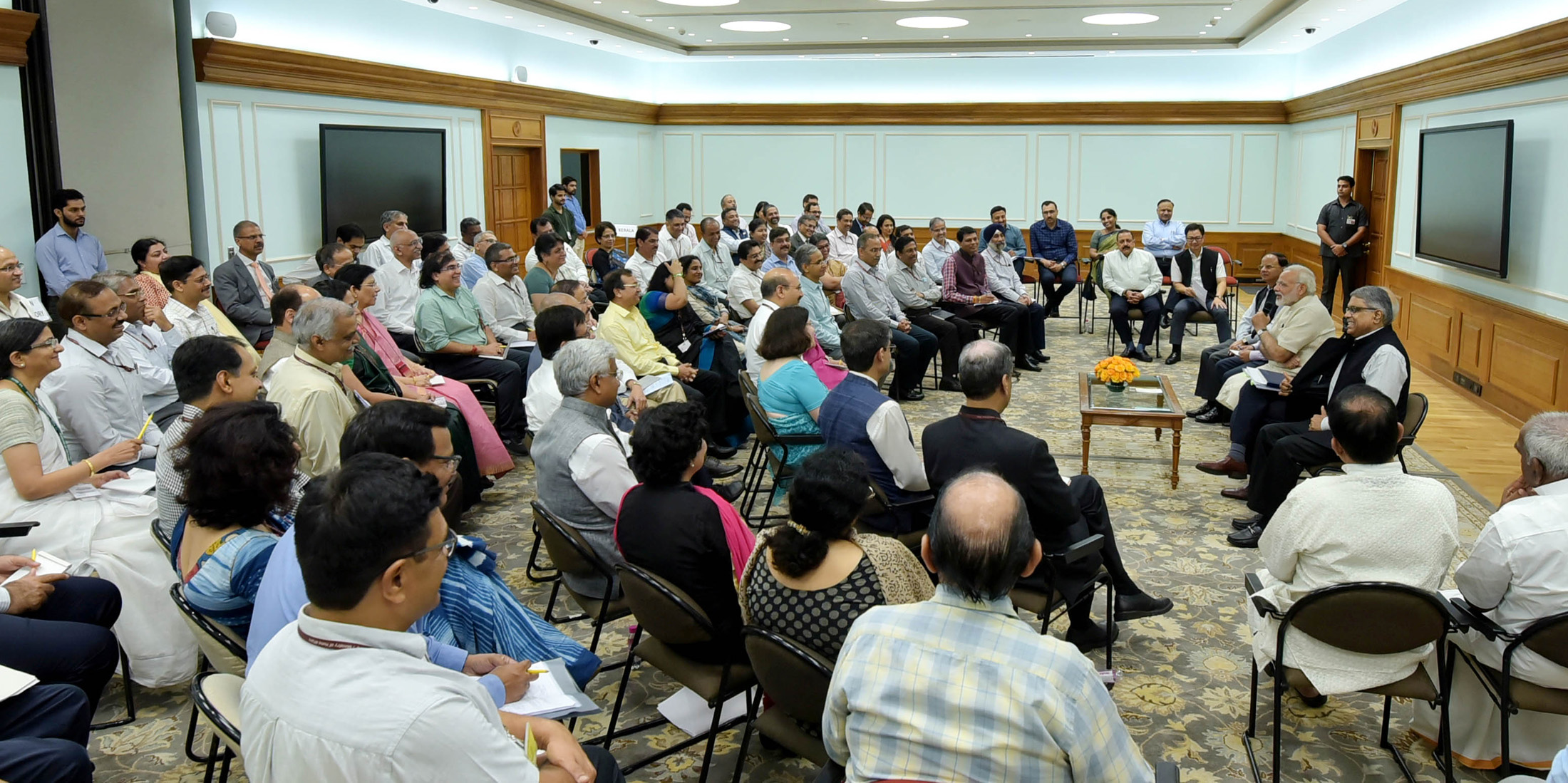
14th Prime Minister of India Narendra Modi talking with Joint Secretaries (GOI) and Additional Secretaries (GOI) in New Delhi in 2017.

In 2015, Government of India modified joint secretary-level empanelment process to ensure greater uniformity, consistency and transparency. Under the prime ministership of Narendra Modi, however, the situation has slightly altered, choices for civil servants being appointed to this rank and post were from non IAS cadre. Almost half the choices for the position have been given to Central Civil Services and All India Services (excluding IAS).

=== Lateral entry ===
There was lateral entry in Government of India during 1950s and 1960s, where Manmohan Singh (1971–1972) and Montek Singh Ahluwalia (1979), both served as Economic Advisers in the rank of Joint Secretary at Ministry of Commerce and Ministry of Finance. However, after that period, lateral entry in this rank was not seen.

In 2009, 20th Governor of Reserve Bank of India Bimal Jalan had voiced for posts at the level of joint secretary to be opened up to outside competition.

In June 2018, Prime Minister Narendra Modi announced first opening up 10 posts of joint secretary (GOI) rank/post in several departments to experts in several fields through lateral entry. In 2019, Government of India short listed 89 candidates from 6000+ candidates, with an initial shortlist success rate of 1.4%. After a year, a lateral entry resigned.

In 2021, Government of India announced second opening up 3 posts of joint secretary (GOI) rank/post in several departments.

=== Supreme Court of India cases and decisions ===
In 2017, 44th Chief Justice of India Jagdish Singh Khehar held that responses on behalf of Government of India before the Supreme Court should be filed by officers not below the ranks of joint secretary (GOI) or additional secretary (GOI).

In 2023, Supreme Court of India held that there was no need for the Central Bureau of Investigation to seek prior sanction for the prosecution of joint secretary (GOI) and above-rank officers in cases registered under the Prevention of Corruption Act.

== Popular culture and depictions ==
In Bollywood film Article 370 released in year 2024, actress Priyamani plays Joint Secretary GOI in Prime Minister's Office, who emerges as the brain behind getting the special status abrogated from Kashmir. In spy thriller film Khufiya released in year 2023, actor Ali Fazal plays the role of Rabinder Singh, who served as Joint Secretary in RAW and a double agent.

== Bibliography ==
- Maheshwari, S.R. (2000). Indian Administration (6th ed.). New Delhi: Orient Blackswan Private Ltd. ISBN 9788125019886.
- Kirk-Greene, A. (2000). Britain's Imperial Administrators, 1858-1966. New York City: Springer. ISBN 9780230286320.
- Jayapalan, N. (2001). Indian Administration 2 Vols. Set. Atlantic Publishers & Distri. ISBN 9788171569212.
- Mehta, Dalpat Singh (1968). Handbook Of Public Relations In India. New Delhi: Allied Publishers. ISBN 978-8170233343.
