= India–Africa Forum Summit =

Multilateral cooperation group

IAFS
- India–Africa Forum Summit
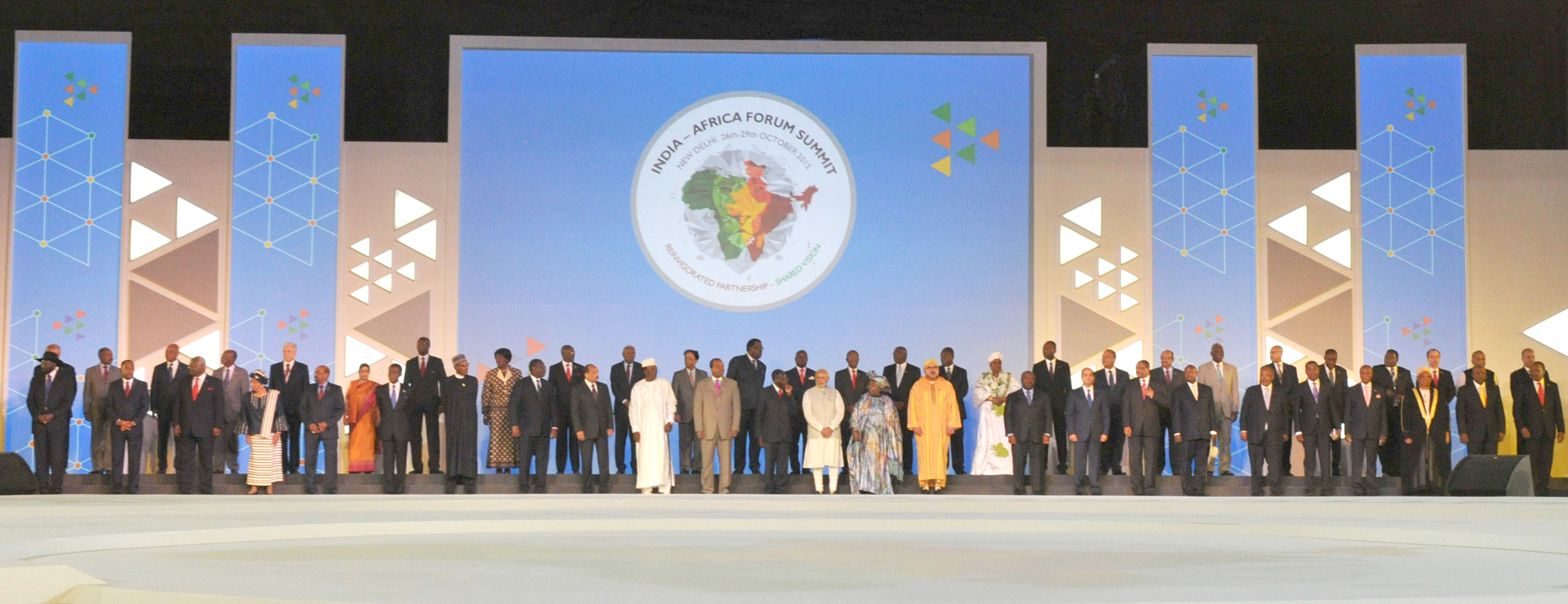
- Indian Prime Minister Narendra Modi and the Leaders of African nations in the Family Photograph
- Abbreviation: IAFS
- Formation: 8 April 2008
- Founder: (India) Manmohan Singh
- Founded at: New Delhi, India
- Type: International forum
- Purpose: Political
- Fields: International politics
- Funding: Attendee states

The India–Africa Forum Summit (IAFS) is the official platform for the African-Indian relations. IAFS is supposed be held once in every three years, however the rule has not been strictly followed. It was first held from April 4 to April 8, 2008 in New Delhi, India. It was the first such meeting between the heads of state and government of India and 14 countries of Africa chosen by the African Union. Libya and Egypt's heads of state did not attend.

== Agenda ==
Rising oil and food prices were the top concerns for the African and Indian leaders during the summit. India has pledged to support at the level of health and education related projects in Africa.

=== Topics ===
- agricultural sector
- trade
- industry and investment
- peace and security
- promotion of good governance and civil society
- information and communication technology

== African representation ==
- Chairperson of the African Union (AU)
- Chairperson of the AU Commission
- Chairpersons of the eight recognised Regional Economic Communities (REC's)
- Chairpersons of the New Partnership for Africa's Development (NEPAD)
- Heads of State and Government Implementation Committee (HSIGC)
- the five African NEPAD initiating countries

== 2008 First India–Africa Forum Summit - New Delhi, India ==
The first such summit was held from April 4 to April 8, 2008 in New Delhi, India. It was the first such meeting between the heads of state and government of India and 14 countries of Africa chosen by the African Union. Libya and Egypt's heads of state did not attend.

== 2011 Second India–Africa Forum Summit - Addis Ababa, Ethiopia ==
The second summit was held at the Ethiopian capital Addis Ababa, with India and 15 African Countries participating. The leaders discussed significant aspects of the India-Africa partnership with the objective of enhancing and widening its ambit for mutual benefit.

== 2015 Third India–Africa Forum Summit - New Delhi ==
The third summit in a rotation basis is held in New Delhi, India from 26 to 30 October 2015. The 5 day summit started with consultations on official level followed by the Head of States/governments level summit on 29 October 2015 with scheduled bilateral meetings on 30 October 2015. This was Modi government's biggest diplomatic outreach involving delegates from a large number of African nations.

Earlier the summit in a rotation basis was scheduled to be held in New Delhi, India in December 2014. But lately Syed Akbaruddin, the official spokesperson of Indian Foreign Ministry told the media that the scheduled summit postponed to 2015 and will include more no. of African leaders unlike previous two occasion where the event was restricted to only 10-15 African countries. In the largest-ever turnout of African leaders in India, at least 41 leaders-including South African president Jacob Zuma, Egyptian president Abdel Fattah el-Sisi, Zimbabwe president Robert Mugabe and Nigerian President Muhammadu Buhari confirmed their presence in New Delhi for the India-Africa forum summit in October 2015.

== 2026 Fourth India–Africa Forum Summit - New Delhi ==
The fourth India–Africa Forum Summit scheduled for 28–31 May, 2026 in New Delhi, was postponed on 21 May 2026 due to an Ebola outbreak in the Democratic Republic of the Congo. The joint statement by India and the African Union cited the "evolving health situation in parts of Africa" and the need to ensure full participation of African leaders.

== See also ==
- Africa-India relations
- Bandung Conference, the first large-scale Asian–African Conference in 1955
- Forum on China-Africa Cooperation
- United States–Africa Leaders Summit
