= List of power stations in Sudan =

Power stations in Sudan

This article lists all power stations in Sudan.

== Hydroelectric power stations ==
Name	Community	Coordinates	Type	Capacity (MW)	Year completed	River	Ref
Roseires	Ad-Damazin	11°47′56″N 34°23′17″E	Reservoir	280 MW		Blue Nile	
Merowe		18°40′08″N 32°03′09″E	Reservoir	1,250 MW	2009	Nile	
Shereyk			Reservoir	350 MW prop.	Proposed, not installed	Nile	
Upper Atbara and Setit		14°14′58.2″N 35°55′47.7″E	Reservoir	320 MW prop.	2017 - proposed		
Kajbar			Reservoir	300 MW prop.	Proposed, not installed	Nile	
Jebel Aulia	Jabal Awliya	15°14′19″N 32°28′37″E	Reservoir	35	1937		
Sennar			Reservoir	15	1925	Nile	
Khashm el-Girba		14°55′31.2″N 35°54′26.6″E	Reservoir	10	1964		

== Thermal ==
Name	Community	Coordinates	Type	Capacity (MW)	Year completed	Ref
Um-Dabakir	Kosti		Crude oil (steam turbines)	500 MW	2016	
El Jaili	Garri Expansion 1&2	16°07′12″N 32°41′31″E	Combined cycle gas turbine	410 MW	2007	
Garri expansion 3			Gas turbines	450 MW	Under const.	
Garri expansion 4			Coke	100 MW		
Khartoum Noth S	Kafouri		Steam turbine	380 MW		
Khartoum Noth G			Gas turbine	180 MW		
Port Sudan			Diesel			

== See also ==
- Eastern Africa Power Pool
- List of power stations in Africa
- List of largest power stations in the world
