= Evacuation of foreign nationals during the Sudanese civil war =

2023 evacuation during the 2023 Sudan conflict

- Part of the Sudanese civil war (2023–present)
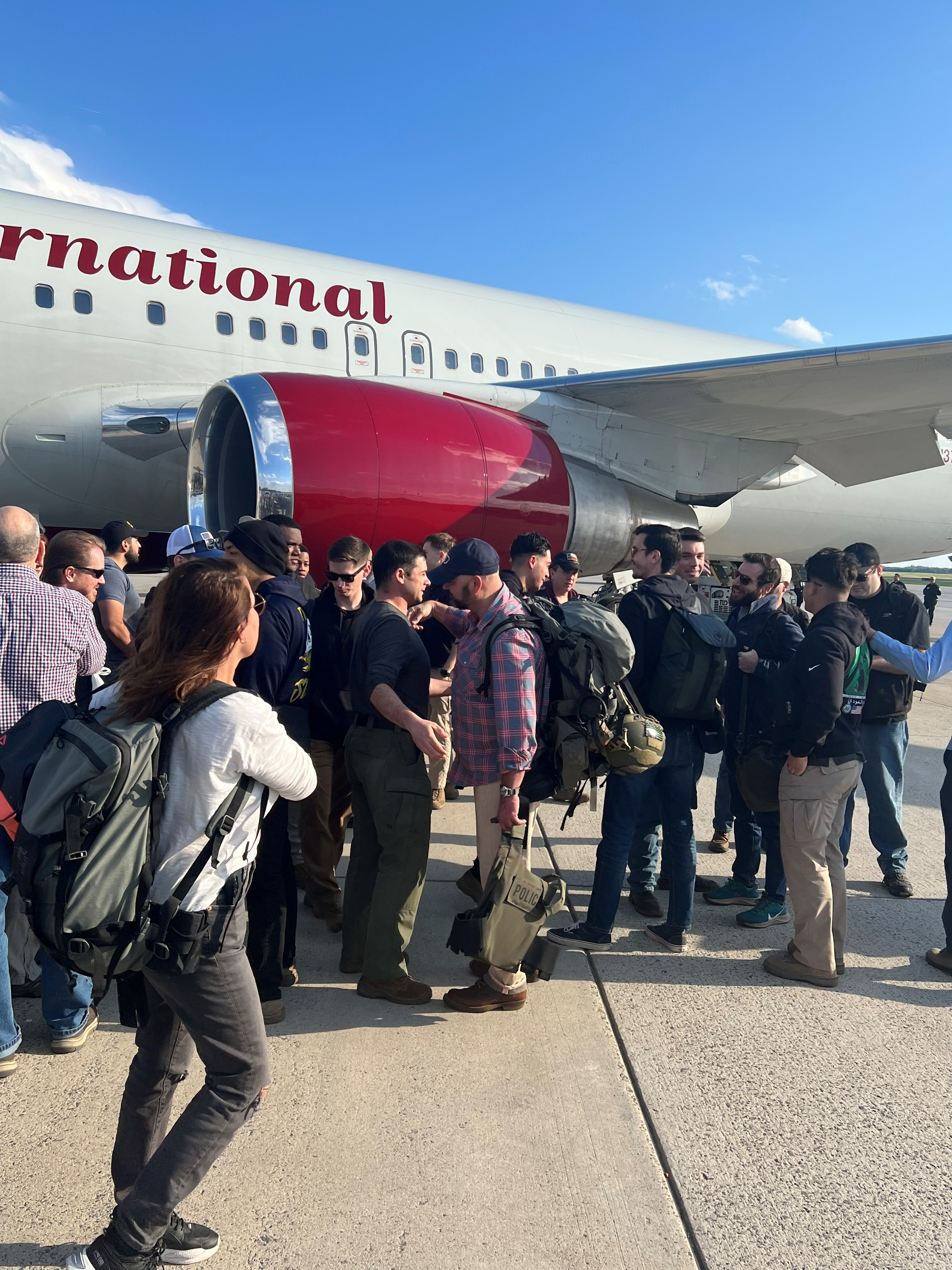
- Evacuated members of the U.S. embassy to Sudan after deplaning at Dulles International Airport on 24 April 2023
- Location: Sudan (in particular Khartoum and Port Sudan)
- Objective: Evacuations of international diplomatic, military and civilian staff, including national civilians
- Date: 19 April 2023 – present

During the Sudanese civil war (2023–present) the outbreak of violence has led foreign governments to monitor the situation in Sudan and move towards the evacuation and repatriation of its nationals. Among some countries with a number of expatriates in Sudan are Egypt, which has more than 10,000 citizens in the country, and the United States, which has more than 16,000 citizens, most of whom are dual nationals.

Efforts at extraction were hampered by the fighting within the capital Khartoum, particularly in and around the airport. This has forced evacuations to be undertaken by road via Port Sudan on the Red Sea, which lies about 650 kilometres (400 mi) northeast of Khartoum, from where they were airlifted or ferried directly to their home countries or to third ones. Other evacuations were undertaken through other land crossings or direct airlifts from diplomatic missions and other designated locations with direct involvement of the militaries of some home countries. Some major transit hubs used during the evacuation include the port of Jeddah in Saudi Arabia and Djibouti, which hosts military bases of the United States, China, Japan, France, and other European countries.

== Timeline ==
France, via the Ministry for Europe and Foreign Affairs and the Ministry for the Armed Forces, coordinated evacuation operations in Sudan, allowing the evacuation of more than 500 people of 36 different nationalities, including 196 French

Repatriations through the European Union Civil Protection Mechanism (UCPM).

=== 19 April ===
Japan's government announced that it was preparing to evacuate its approximately 60 citizens from Sudan, becoming the first foreign nation to pull citizens from the country. Japan Air Self-Defense Force sent a C-130H transport aircraft, C-2 transport aircraft and KC-767 aerial refueling tanker and transport aircraft to Djibouti on standby for that occasion.

Germany attempted a mission to evacuate around 150 citizens from Sudan. Der Spiegel reported that the German Air Force dispatched three A400M transport planes that stopped over in Greece to refuel and were later expected to fly to Khartoum. However, the plan was aborted by the Bundeswehr because of renewed clashes and airstrikes. The news was later confirmed by the German government. On 21 April, the Federal Ministry of Defence said that it was preparing again to rescue its citizens from Sudan.

=== 20 April ===
The Norwegian Armed Forces stated that two C-130 transport aircraft and a surgical team were sent to Jordan on 20 April. One of the aircraft flew three sorties and evacuated 75 Norwegian citizens and an undisclosed number of other foreign nationals.

=== 22 April ===
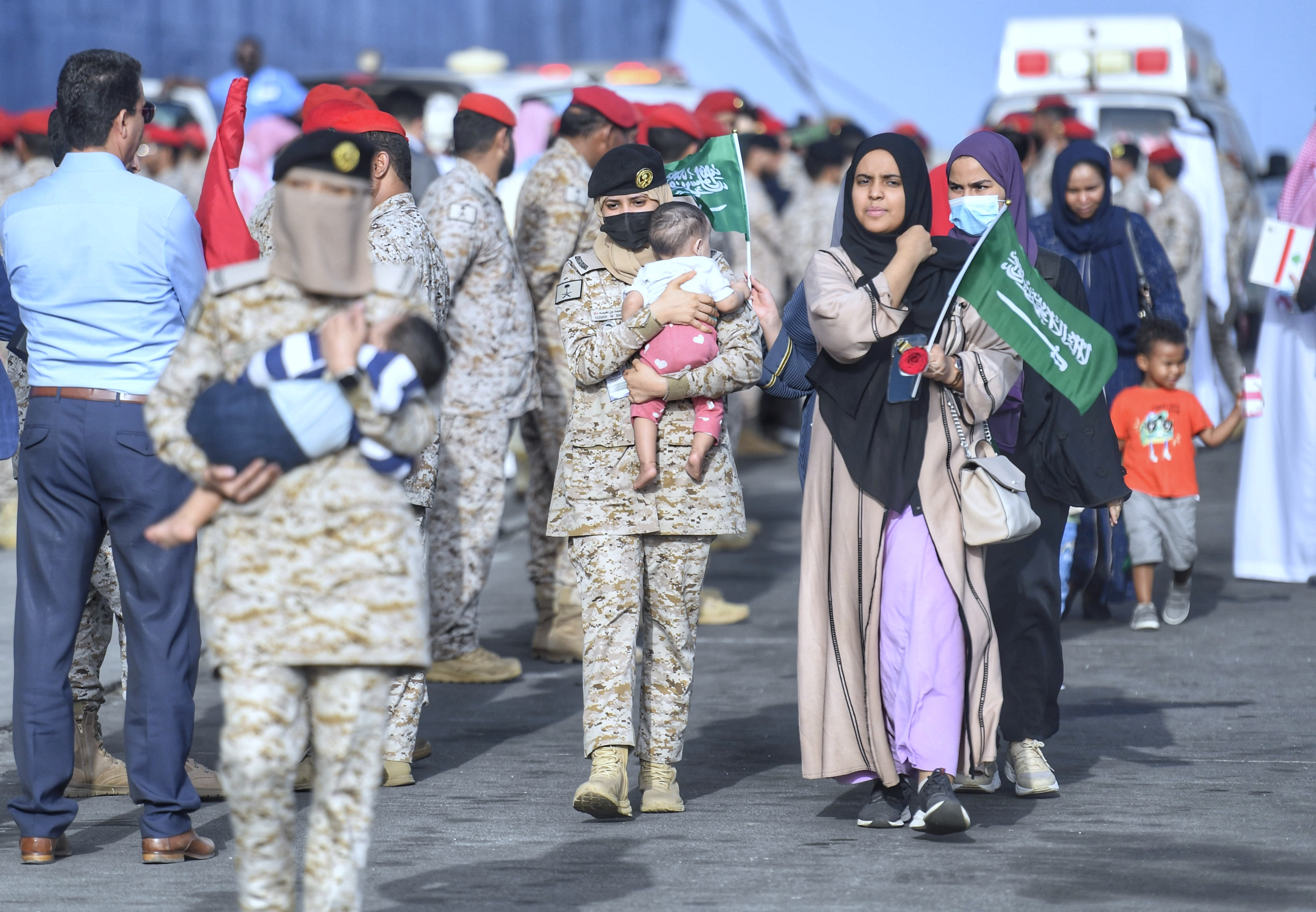
Evacuation of foreign nationals to Saudi Arabia

The SAF agreed to secure the evacuation of UK, US, French and Chinese diplomats and nationals from Sudan by air. Saudi diplomats were evacuated by land to Port Sudan and then by air. Some 150 foreign nationals also began to be evacuated by boat with the assistance of the Saudi Armed Forces from Port Sudan, with the first vessels arriving across the Red Sea to the port of Jeddah, Saudi Arabia.

From the night of 22–23 April, an airlift was set up by the French army during Operation Sagittaire. A C-130 Hercules arriving from Djibouti landed with night vision binoculars in the Wadi Seidna Air Base; the French commandos on board secured the base after negotiations with the Sudanese military. Three A400M Atlas then also arrived from Djibouti and evacuated French and foreign nationals.

=== 23 April ===
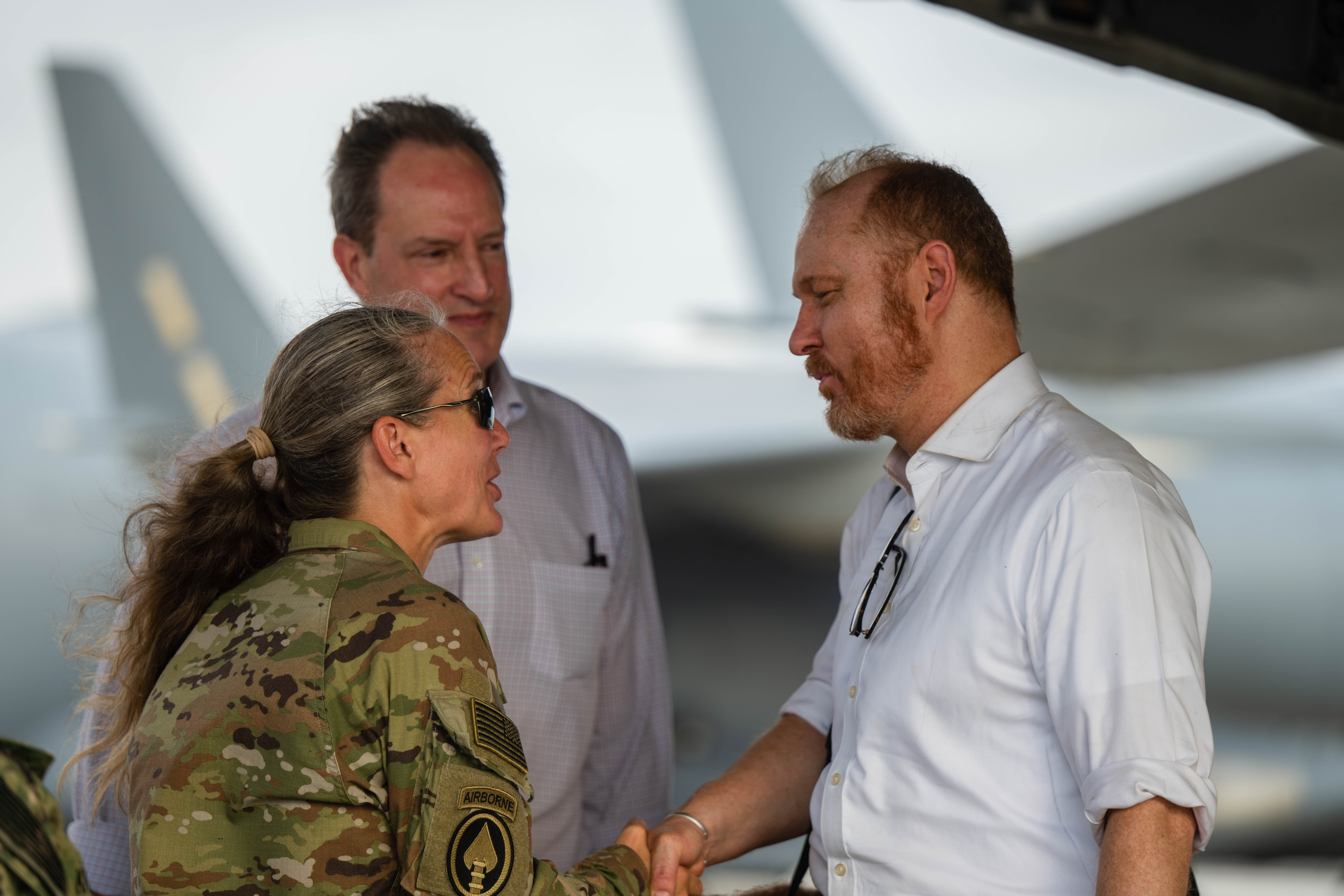
Ambassador of the United States to the Republic of Sudan, John T. Godfrey (right) shakes hands with Major General Jami Shawley at Camp Lemonnier after successfully evacuating from Khartoum.

100 US diplomats and nationals at the US embassy were evacuated aboard six Boeing CH-47 Chinook helicopters with the help of the US Navy Seals and Army Special Forces, who were part of additional forces sent to Camp Lemonnier in Djibouti. The RSF said that it had coordinated with the US military regarding the operation, and said it will assist in the evacuations of other nationals. However, a French convoy which left the embassy, was shot at while leaving which forced it to turn back. The French government later confirmed one of its soldiers had been injured in the incident. Later in the day, the French Foreign Ministry announced that it had managed to evacuate around 100 people of multiple nationalities from Sudan by air after what it called a "complicated" rescue operation. The UK government also evacuated its diplomatic staff and their families with the help of its armed forces. Planes from Italy, Jordan, and Spain also airlifted evacuees of various nationalities to Djibouti or directly to their home countries.

Turkey began rescue operations via road from the city of Wad Madani, but the effort was postponed from one site in Khartoum after explosions near the area while the Russian ambassador announced that most Russian citizens in Khartoum had been secured in the embassy.

After its cancelled attempt on 19 April, the German government finally began evacuations of its nationals. The Bundeswehr confirmed that the first of three planes in the evacuation operation had left Sudan, carrying 101 people on board. The plane made a stopover at the German evacuation hub in Al-Azraq Air Base in Jordan before proceeding to Berlin on 24 April.

The Swedish Riksdag, approved a proposal to allow the government to provide a unit of up to 400 soldiers to evacuate its citizens in Sudan.

An Emergency Consular Assistance Team departed from Ireland for Sudan on a mission to evacuate 150 Irish people and their families from the conflict. The team consisted of officials from the Irish Department of Foreign Affairs and members of the Defence Forces, including Army Ranger Wing personnel.

436 Egyptian citizens were evacuated through land routes, in coordination with Sudanese authorities.

=== 24 April ===
The Norwegian Armed Forces stated to the newspaper Aftenposten that they have supported and advised the Ministry of Foreign Affairs in evacuation of Norwegian citizens, but did not want to elaborate on what they concretely do and have done.

The South African International Relations Department (DIRCO) said that 77 South African nationals and diplomats were making their way out of Sudan DIRCO also stated that they have been requested by the Tanzanian government to help them to evacuate their nationals.

The Lebanese Ministry of Foreign Affairs announced that it evacuated 52 citizens by sea from Port Sudan to Jeddah, Saudi Arabia with the help of the Royal Saudi Navy.

India announced the start of its rescue operation for Indian nationals trapped in Sudan, codenamed Operation Kaveri. The External Affairs Ministry said two C-130J aircraft of the Indian Air Force were on standby in Jeddah as part of preparations for evacuation, while the Indian Navy's INS Sumedha had reached Port Sudan.

A South Korean military C-130 transport plane evacuated 28 Koreans along with an unspecified number of Japanese nationals from Port Sudan to Jeddah, from where most of the evacuees were transferred to KC-330 Cygnus back to Seoul.

The Dutch ministry of defence announced that two separate flights of Royal Netherlands Air Force C-130H transport planes departed from Sudan bringing Dutch nationals to Aqaba, Jordan where the Rapid Consular Support Team of the Ministry of Foreign Affairs and a medical team were waiting.

UK Armed Forces Minister James Heappey said that a military reconnaissance team arrived in eastern Sudan to assess evacuation options. According to Development Minister Andrew Mitchell, up to 4,000 British nationals were still in Sudan.

US Secretary of State Antony Blinken announced that the United States was considering reopening their diplomatic presence in Sudan (potentially in Port Sudan) and was seeking to provide evacuation options for American citizens in the country. The Department of Defense stated that the destroyer USS Truxtun was deployed near Port Sudan and was awaiting further orders. The ship was expected to be accompanied by USS Lewis B. Puller.

Indonesian Ministry of Foreign Affairs announced that at 01:00 local time, 538 evacuees arrived safely at Port Sudan from Khartoum after ~15 hours by road and passing through 15 security checkpoints, marking the first evacuation phase, and they would continue their journey to Jeddah by sea.

The Ministry of Foreign Affairs and Worship of Argentina announced that two Argentine citizens had been evacuated from Sudan with the help of the Spanish embassy in Khartoum. They both arrived in Madrid hours later. A third Argentine national was reported to have been evacuated via land to Ethiopia with the help of the Red Cross.

It was reported that the Chinese embassy in Sudan was collecting evacuation requests from its nationals.

=== 25 April ===
The Indian Navy vessel INS Teg arrived at Port Sudan to support the evacuation of Indian nationals.

A Royal Air Force C-130J undertook the first evacuation flight of British nationals from Wadi Seidna Air Base in Sudan to RAF Akrotiri, with 2 more planned overnight. Sky News reported that 1,400 military personnel were believed to be undertaking this operation.

Ukraine said it had evacuated 138 people, including 87 Ukrainians, to Egypt.

=== 26 April ===
The German Defence Ministry said it had wrapped up its evacuation operations, having airlifted over 700 people from Sudan, including around 200 German citizens.

The Philippine Vice Consul to Egypt, Bojer Capati, was injured after the car he was travelling in with Philippine Ambassador to Egypt Ezzedin Tago figured in an accident on their way to the Sudanese border to oversee repatriation efforts. The embassy in Cairo has jurisdiction over Filipinos in Sudan as there is no Philippine Embassy in Khartoum.

The Sri Lankan Foreign Ministry announced it had evacuated the first group of Sri Lankan nationals from Sudan with the help of the Saudi Armed Forces. Nigeria began evacuating its nationals from Sudan, using about 40 buses to transport 3,500 evacuees to Aswan, in Egypt.

The Indonesian Ministry of Foreign Affairs announced that 557 Indonesian citizens evacuated in phase I had arrived in Jeddah while 328 Indonesian citizens in phase II evacuation had arrived in Port Sudan. The total number of Indonesian citizens who were evacuated from Khartoum reached 897 people. On the same day Indonesian Air Force aircraft carrying 110 Indonesian citizens from Port Sudan arrived in Jeddah, putting the total number of evacuees arriving in Jeddah at 667 persons. In total, the Indonesian Air Force Boeing 737-400 (A-7305) evacuated 355 Indonesians and 17 (some said 25) foreign nationals of Bangladesh, the Philippines, Australia, Sudan, and Djibouti from Port Sudan to Jeddah in four sorties.

The Chinese Ministry of National Defense sent two warships (Type 052D Nanning and Type 903 Weishanhu) to Port Sudan to pick up the evacuated nationals and other personnel arranged by the Chinese embassy, and arrived at Jeddah Port on the next day.

=== 27 April ===
Canada carried out its first evacuation of its nationals from Sudan, using a Royal Canadian Air Force C-130 transport aircraft that evacuated 180 Canadian and foreign citizens. Chad also carried out its first evacuation flight, airlifting 226 people on board two charter flights, including 39 children. China also evacuated about 1,300 of its citizens and dispatched a naval vessel to Port Sudan.

Greece completed the evacuation of its civilians with a C-130 flight from Khartoum to Egypt and thence Athens. The total number of Greek and foreign citizens evacuated by the Greek Air Force amounted to 125 persons.

On the night of 27–28 April, a C-130J aircraft of the Indian Air Force with 121 Indians took off from Wadi Seidna Air Base.

Tanzania evacuated its 206 citizens and nationals from eight countries on five buses from Khartoum to the Ethiopian border town of Metemma and then to Gondar from where they were airlifted to Addis Ababa. An Air Tanzania aircraft then transferred them to Dar es Salaam.

=== 28 April ===
A Turkish evacuation plane was fired upon at Wadi Seidna Air Base and required repair after it sustained damage to its fuel system. There were no casualties reported. The SAF blamed the RSF for the attack, which it denied.

The two Chinese warships that had previously picked up evacuees on the 26th returned to the Port Sudan and continued to pick up the second batch of evacuees, a total of 493 people, 221 of whom were requested by other countries. They arrived at Jeddah the next day. After completing the mission, the two warships returned to the fleet of the Gulf of Aden escort mission to which they belonged.

=== 29 April ===
The 12th batch of the Indian Air Force C-130J flights with 135 Indian evacuees reached Jeddah from Sudan. Indian Minister of State for External Affairs V Muraleedharan announced that around 2,400 stranded Indians had arrived in Jeddah under Operation Kaveri. The UK conducted its last evacuation flight from Wadi Seidna Airbase.

=== 30 April ===
The USNS Brunswick was deployed to Port Sudan to assist in the evacuation of American citizens. The UK offered an additional flight shortly from Port Sudan on 1 May after concluding what its last evacuation flights from Wadi Seidna Airbase, having evacuated 2,122 people.

=== 2 May ===
Australian Minister for Foreign Affairs Penny Wong confirmed that a Royal Australian Air Force C-130J evacuated over 36 Australians and their family members, in addition to civilians from six other nations overnight. The evacuation flight landed in the early hours of the morning in Cyprus. More than 100 Indonesian nationals returned to Indonesia via Jeddah using Garuda Indonesia aircraft.

Russia said it had evacuated more than 200 of its diplomats and other Russian nationals as well as citizens from former Soviet republics, with television footage showing two Defence Ministry transport aircraft landing outside Moscow.

=== 14 May ===
Yemen evacuated a total of 392 Yemeni citizens stranded in Sudan. In two flights, Yemeni authorities evacuated 197 citizens to the port city of Aden and the other 195 people to the Houthi-controlled capital of Sanaa.

=== 2 August ===
Russia announced it had evacuated more embassy staff and other nationals from Sudan, with their special evacuation flight landing at Chkalovsky Air Base, northeast of Moscow.

== Controversy ==
Senior German officials accused the British of causing delays in rescue efforts, telling the BBC that British forces landed without the SAF's permission at Wadi Seidna, which angered the SAF such that they refused access to the facility. According to one source, the British had to pay the SAF to allow them access, which resulted in at least half a day's delay for German rescuers. The UK Ministry of Defence denied these reports, calling them "complete nonsense".

== Participating countries ==
1. Afghanistan
2. Algeria
3. Angola
4. Argentina
5. Armenia
6. Australia
7. Austria
8. Azerbaijan
9. Bahrain
10. Bangladesh
11. Belarus
12. Belgium
13. Benin
14. Brazil
15. Burkina Faso
16. Burundi
17. Cambodia
18. Cameroon
19. Canada
20. Chad
21. China
22. Colombia
23. Croatia
24. Cyprus
25. Czechia
26. Democratic Republic of the Congo
27. Denmark
28. Djibouti
29. Egypt
30. Ethiopia
31. Finland
32. France
33. Gambia
34. Georgia
35. Germany (operation)
36. Ghana
37. Greece
38. Guatemala
39. Guinea
40. Guinea-Bissau
41. Hungary
42. India (operation)
43. Indonesia
44. Iran
45. Iraq
46. Ireland
47. Italy
48. Ivory Coast
49. Japan
50. Jordan
51. Kazakhstan
52. Kenya
53. Kuwait
54. Kyrgyzstan
55. Latvia
56. Lebanon
57. Lesotho
58. Libya
59. Malawi
60. Malaysia
61. Mali
62. Malta
63. Mauritania
64. Mexico
65. Morocco
66. Mozambique
67. Namibia
68. Nepal
69. Netherlands
70. Nicaragua
71. Niger
72. Nigeria
73. North Macedonia
74. Norway
75. Oman
76. Pakistan
77. Palestine
78. Peru
79. Philippines
80. Poland
81. Portugal
82. Qatar
83. Romania
84. Russia
85. Rwanda
86. Saudi Arabia
87. Senegal
88. Serbia
89. Sierra Leone
90. Singapore
91. Somalia
92. South Africa
93. South Korea
94. South Sudan
95. Spain
96. Sweden
97. Switzerland
98. Syria
99. Tanzania
100. Thailand
101. Togo
102. Tunisia
103. Turkey
104. Uganda
105. Ukraine
106. United Arab Emirates
107. United Kingdom
108. United States
109. Uzbekistan
110. Venezuela
111. Yemen
112. Zambia
113. Zimbabwe and others
