= Khashm el Girba Airport =

Airport in Sudan

Khashm el Girba Airstrip
- IATA: GBU; ICAO: HSKG

Summary
- Airport type: Public
- Serves: Khashm el Girba
- Elevation AMSL: 1,560 ft / 475 m
- Coordinates: 14°55′30″N 35°52′40″E

Map
- Location of the airport in Sudan

Runways
Direction	Length		Surface
Direction	ft	m	Surface
04/22	6,560	2,000	Gravel
- Source: Google Maps

Khashm el Girba Airport (IATA: GBU , ICAO: HSKG ) is an airport serving the town of Khashm el Girba and the Khashm el Girba Dam in Sudan.

== See also ==
- Transport in Sudan
