= India–South Sudan relations =

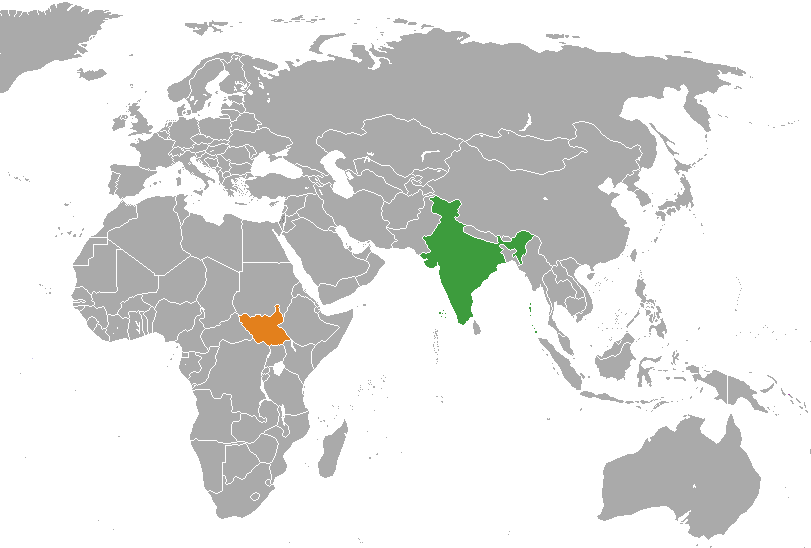

- India: South Sudan

India–South Sudan relations are the bilateral ties between the Republic of India and the Republic of South Sudan. India recognised South Sudan on 9 July 2011, the day South Sudan became an independent state. India maintains an embassy at Juba, and South Sudan maintains an embassy in New Delhi.

== History ==
India remained neutral during the First Sudanese Civil War (1962–72) and the Second Sudanese Civil War (1983–2005). The Southern Sudan Autonomous Region was established at the end of the First Civil War. Indian President Fakhruddin Ali Ahmed visited the region in December 1975, and addressed the Regional Peoples' Assembly in Juba. According to the Embassy of India in Khartoum, "On the whole, the visit to Juba made it evident that the Southern Sudanese have deeper respect for India." Indian engagement with South Sudan increased after the end of the Second Civil War. Then Indian Minister of State for External Affairs E.A. Ahamed attended the signing of the Comprehensive Peace Agreement on 9 January 2005 in Nairobi.

From 2006, India began inviting South Sudanese citizens for training and exchange programmes in India. India opened a consulate in Juba in August 2007. India formally recognized South Sudan on 9 July 2011, the day it declared independence, and Vice President Mohammad Hamid Ansari attended the country's independence day celebrations in Juba. In a letter to South Sudanese President Salva Kiir, Indian Prime Minister Manmohan Singh wrote, "India stands ready to share its development experience and extend whatever assistance possible to South Sudan. I am confident that our co-operation will grow from strength to strength in the coming days for the mutual benefit of our two peoples." The Indian government has stated that it was willing to assist in developing infrastructure, training officials in health, education and rural development. A Foreign Ministry official stated, "We have compiled a definite road map using (sic) which India can help South Sudan." The Consulate General in Juba was upgraded to an embassy in March 2012.

President Salva Kiir attended the Third India Africa Forum Summit in New Delhi in October 2015, and also held a bilateral meeting with Indian Prime Minister Narendra Modi, the first state visit by a South Sudanese President to India.

== Economic relations ==
Pramit Pal Chaudhuri wrote in the Hindustan Times that South Sudan "has other attractions. As the Indian Foreign Ministry's own literature notes, South Sudan [is] 'reported to has (sic) some of the largest oil reserves in Africa outside Nigeria and Angola." An article in The Telegraph noted that South Sudan is "one of the poorest [countries] in the world, [but] is oil rich. Foreign ministry officials said New Delhi has [a] keen interest in increasing its investments in the oil fields in South Sudan, which now owns over two-thirds of the erstwhile united Sudan's oil fields."

Bilateral trade between the two countries is limited, and precise statistics are not available as most of the trade is conducted through third countries such as Kenya and the United Arab Emirates. The main commodities exported from India to South Sudan are consumer and household goods, food items, pharmaceuticals, motorcycles and three-wheelers. The main commodities India imports from South Sudan are oil and timber.

Between 2003 and 2015, ONGC Videsh Ltd. invested a total US$ 2.5 billion in the oil industries of Sudan and South Sudan.

== Indian peacekeepers ==
As of January 2016, two battalions of the Indian Army, or 2,000 personnel, are deployed in Jonglei and Upper Nile, South Sudan's two largest states, as part of the United Nations Mission in South Sudan (UNMISS). 37 Indian Police officers are also present in the country training the South Sudan National Police Service. Indian civilians are also present as part of UNMISS. The Indian Army battalions have also been involved in community activities such as conducting medical camps, donating books to educational institutions, and building roads.

One senior Indian Army officer and four soldiers were killed, and four Indian soldiers were injured on 9 April 2013, when a contingent of 36 Indian soldiers escorting a United Nations convoy from Pibor to Bor in Jonglei state was attacked by rebels. Two more Indian soldiers were killed in an attack on the UN Base at Akobo, Jonglei State on 19 December 2013, and another two soldiers were injured during an attack on the UN Base at Bor, Jonglei State in April 2014.

== Indian foreign aid ==
India pledged US$5 million for the construction of a hospital in South Sudan at the April 2005 Oslo Donors Conference. India donated US$100,000 worth of tents and medicines to both Sudan and South Sudan for flood relief efforts in January 2008. To boost South Sudan's almost non-existent power generation infrastructure, India's Central Electronics Limited completed a solar electrification project near Juba in 2011. In February 2012, India and South Sudan signed an agreement to include the latter in the Pan African e-Network Project. State-owned ONGC Videsh Ltd. donated 1,000 artificial limbs (Jaipur foot) to disabled veterans of South Sudan's armed forces in 2014.

The Indian government has also offered to establish a vocational training centre, a rural technology park and an agricultural seed production and development centre in South Sudan.

India is a major destination for South Sudanese patients seeking medical treatment. Citizens of South Sudan are eligible for scholarships under the Indian Technical and Economic Cooperation Programme and the Indian Council for Cultural Relations.

== Indians in South Sudan ==
Most of the Indian community in South Sudan migrated north to Sudan following the outbreak of the Second Civil War in 1983. As of January 2016, 700 Indian citizens reside in South Sudan. Some are business owners in Juba. Indians own and operate hotels, borehole companies, printing presses and department stores. The community was among the first to establish such businesses in South Sudan beginning in early 2006. Some Indian citizens are employed by various companies in the country, and a small number are Christian missionaries.

There are also 2,000 Indian Army peacekeepers, 37 police officers and several civilian officials attached to UNMISS resident in South Sudan as of January 2016.

== See also ==
- India-Sudan relations
- Embassy of India, Juba
