= Um-Dabakir Power Station =

Power station in Rabak, White Nile, Sudan

- Official name: محطة كهرباء ام دباكر
- Country: Sudan
- Location: Rabak, White Nile
- Coordinates: 13°12′34.0″N 32°49′25.2″E
- Status: Operational
- Commission date: February 2016
- Construction cost: $457 million

Power generation
- Units operational: 4
- Nameplate capacity: 500 MW

The Um-Dabakir Power Station (Arabic: محطة كهرباء ام دباكر) is a power station in Rabak, White Nile State, Sudan. It is the largest thermal power station in the country.

== History ==
The power station was constructed by Bharat Heavy Electricals Limited. It was commissioned in February 2016 in a ceremony officiated by President Omar al-Bashir. The ceremony was attended by senior officials and representative of the Indian Embassy in Sudan.

== Technical specifications ==
The power station consists of four generation units. Each unit is rated 125 MW. With a total generation capacity of 500 MW, it is the largest power station in Sudan.

== Finance ==
The power station was constructed with a cost of US$457 million. A total of US$350 million of it was financed by credit by Exim Bank of India.

== See also ==
- List of power stations in Sudan
