= INS Sumedha =

Indian Navy patrol vessel

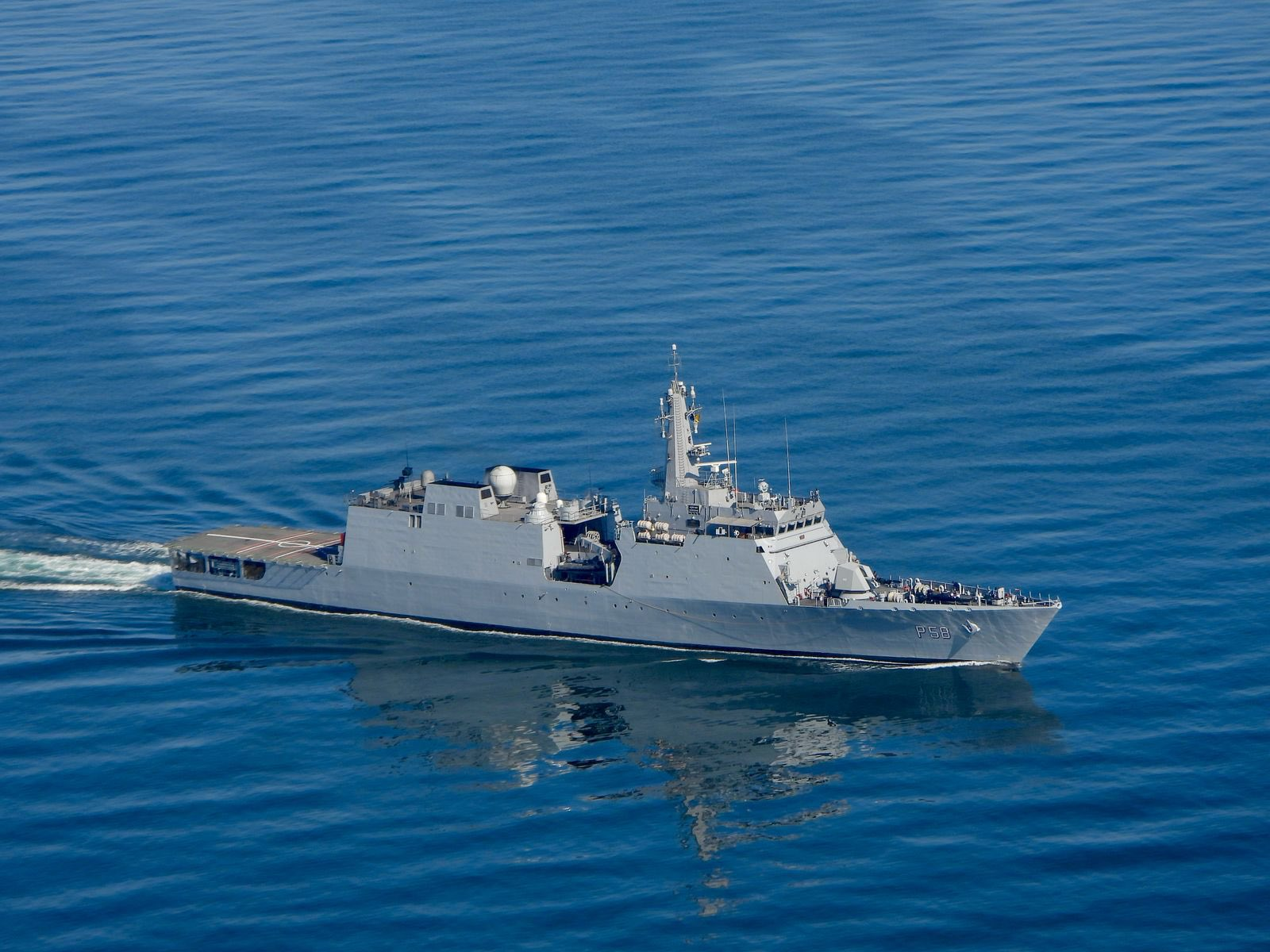
- Sumedha (P58) at sea.

History

India
- Name: INS Sumedha
- Namesake: Sumedha
- Operator: Indian Navy
- Builder: Goa Shipyard Limited
- Launched: 21 May 2011
- Commissioned: 15 January 2014
- Status: Active
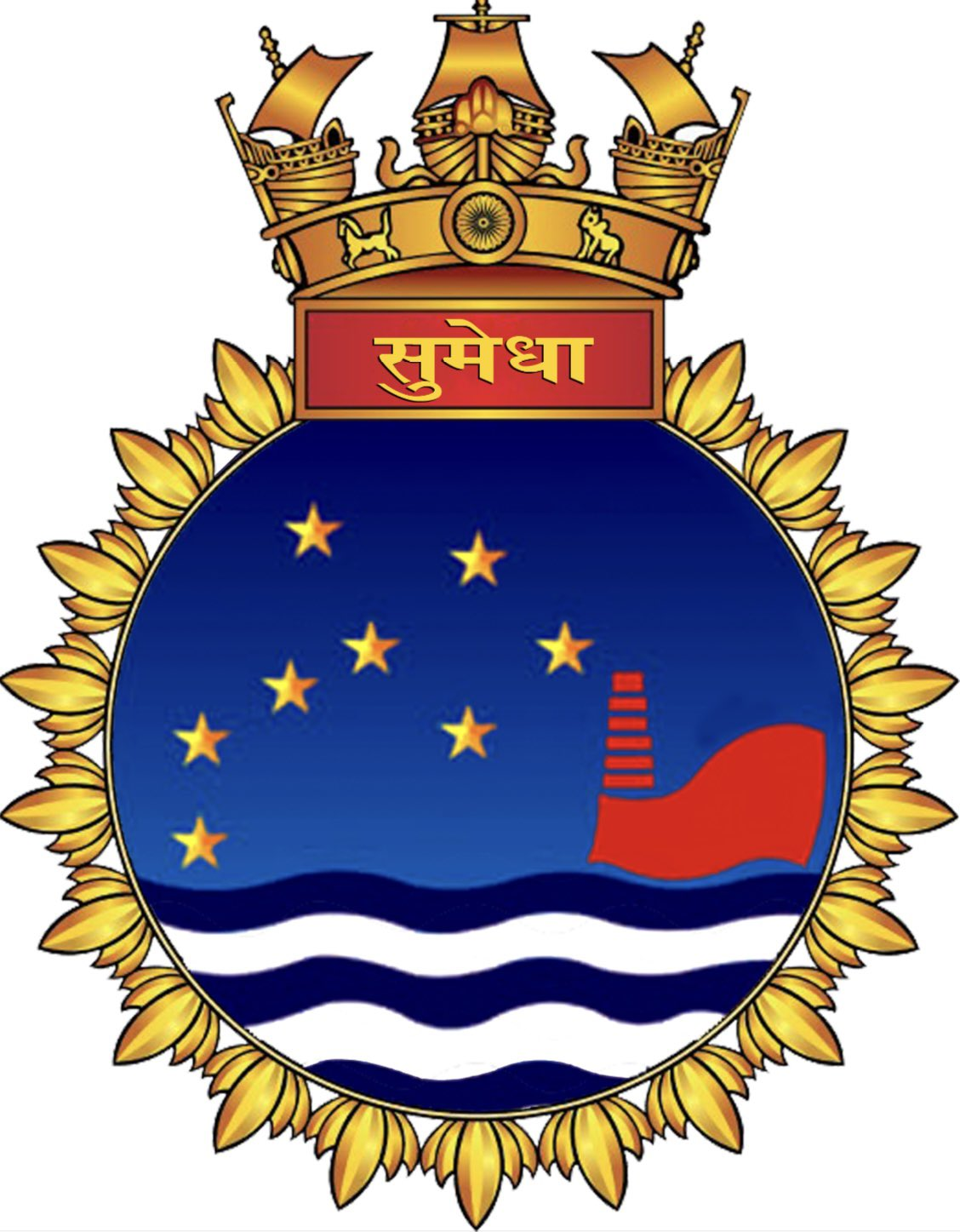
- Badge

General characteristics
- Class & type: Saryu-class patrol vessel
- Tonnage: 2,200 tonnes (2,200 long tons; 2,400 short tons)
- Length: 105 m (344 ft)
- Propulsion: Two KOEL/Pielstick Diesel engines
- Speed: 25 knots (46 km/h; 29 mph)
- Range: 6,000 nautical miles (11,000 km; 6,900 mi) at 16 knots (30 km/h; 18 mph)
- Complement: Eight officers and 108 sailors
- Armament: 76-mm SRGM (Super Rapid Gun Mount); close-in weapon system; CHAFF launchers

INS Sumedha (P58) is the third Saryu-class patrol vessel of the Indian Navy, designed and constructed indigenously by the Goa Shipyard Limited. It is designed to undertake fleet support operations, coastal and offshore patrolling, ocean surveillance and monitoring of sea lines of communications and offshore assets and escort duties.

== Construction ==
The Naval Offshore Patrol Vessel INS Sumedha was launched at Goa Shipyard on 21 May 2011, and was handed over to the Indian Navy on 11 March 2014.

== Service history ==
=== 2020 ===
On 6 June, Sumedha during anti-piracy patrol in the Arabian sea came to the rescue of the dhow Al-Hamid and was towed to safety away from Somalia coast.

=== 2022 ===
As a part of its long range deployment, Sumedha, visited Port Tanjung Benoa, Bali on 4 August 2022. Before making the port call at Bali, the ship undertook maritime partnership exercise with KRI Sultan Hasanuddin. The ship sailed on from Bali to Perth on 6 August 2022.

The ship arrived in Perth on 15 August 2022 as a part of 75th year of Indian independence. The ship took part in training exercise with HMAS Anzac. During her return passage to India, Sumedha made a port call at Port Klang, Malaysia.

=== 2023 ===
Sumedha visited Abu Dhabi, United Arab Emirates on 23 February to participate in NAVDEX and IDEX'23 exhibition and showcases India's capability in self reliance and shipbuilding.

She also took part in Operation Kaveri, bring back 278 Indian citizens from Sudan.During its deployment to the Mediterranean Sea, Sumedha visited Algiers, Algeria on 26 May to bolsters Navy to Navy ties, the ship undertook various exercise with the Algerian Navy. In August, She made a visit to Bali, Indonesia.

On 6 September, Sumedha arrived at Port Alexandria, Egypt to participate in the exercise Exercise Bright Star-23, a multinational tri-service exercise involving 34 nations. This marks the maiden participation by India Navy to the exercise.

Sumedha made a port call at Lagos, Nigeria on 13 October 2023. The visit is aimed to further bilateral relation between the two countries. The ship undertook exercise with NNS Unity to bolster interoperability between the two navies. The deployment is to further Indian Navy's effort to curb piracy in the sensitive Gulf of Guinea region.

Sumedha during its mission based deployment to curb piracy made the port call at Walvis Bay, Namibia. The visit is a part of Indian Navy outreach with Bridges of Friendship initiative in the Western Africa region. The ship undertook various interaction and exercises with Namibian armed forces. With the culmination of the visit, India Navy successfully completed its second Gulf of Guinea anti-piracy patrol along the west coast of Africa with exercises and port visit with Senegal, Ghana, Togo, Nigeria, Angola and Namibia.

On 21 November, Sumedha made a port call at Maputo, Mozambique. The visit aimed to enhance interoperability, joint EEZ patrol and conduct various exercises amongst both navies.She returned back to Visakapatnam on 29th December, after a 22,000 kilometer voyage where she visited 12 nations and conducted deep sea patrols.

=== 2024 ===
On 29 March 2024, Sumedha intercepted an Iranian fishing vessel FV Al-Kambar 786 which was hijacked by nine armed pirates 90 nautical miles off the coast of Socotra islands, Yemen in Indian Ocean. The ship was later joined by Trishul. The crew, consisting of 23 Pakistani nationals, were rescued in a 12-hour long operation. The pirates were later brought to Mumbai on April 3rd, where they will be held facing legal action for their crimes.

On 30 April 2024, Sumedha responded promptly to a distress call and provided critical medical aid to a Pakistani crew member aboard an Iranian fishing vessel, Al Rahmani, from a near drowning situation of one of its crew members.

=== 2026 ===
INS Sumedha served as the presidential yacht for Droupadi Murmu and lead the presidential survey during the International Fleet review 2026.

== Gallery ==
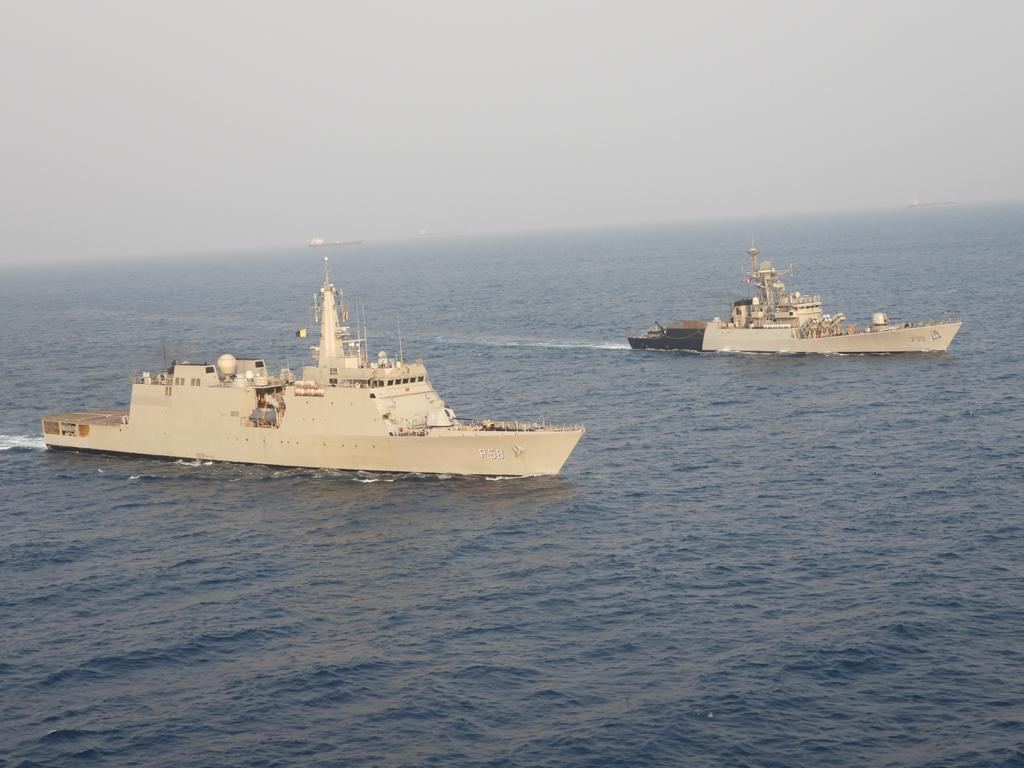
INS Sumedha (P58) and INS Kulish (P63) en route to Bangladesh.

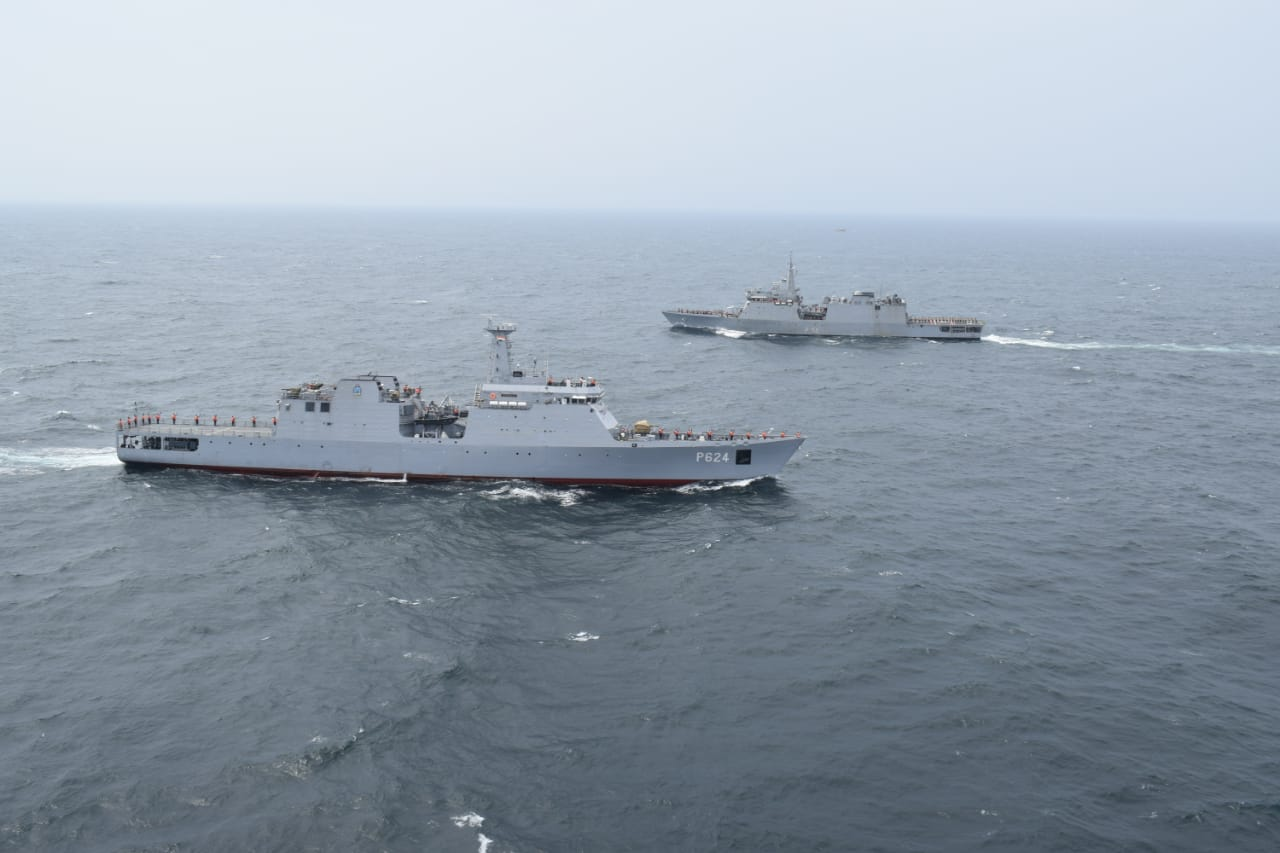
SLNS Sindurala (P624) and INS Sumedha during SLINEX 2019.

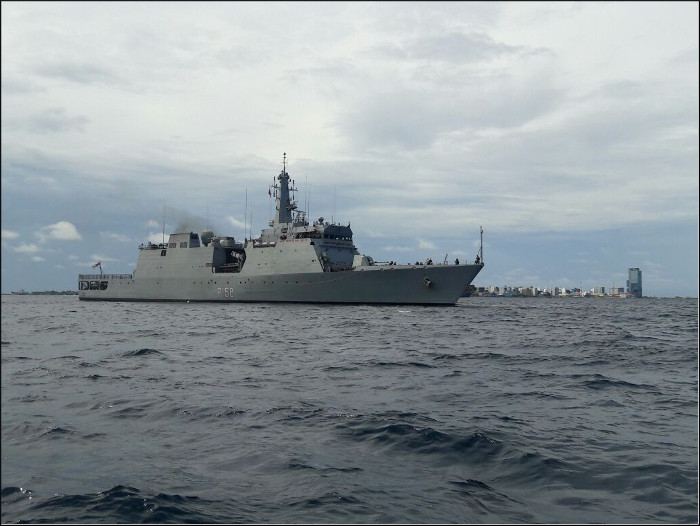
INS Sumedha during exclusive economic zone surveillance of Maldives, 2018

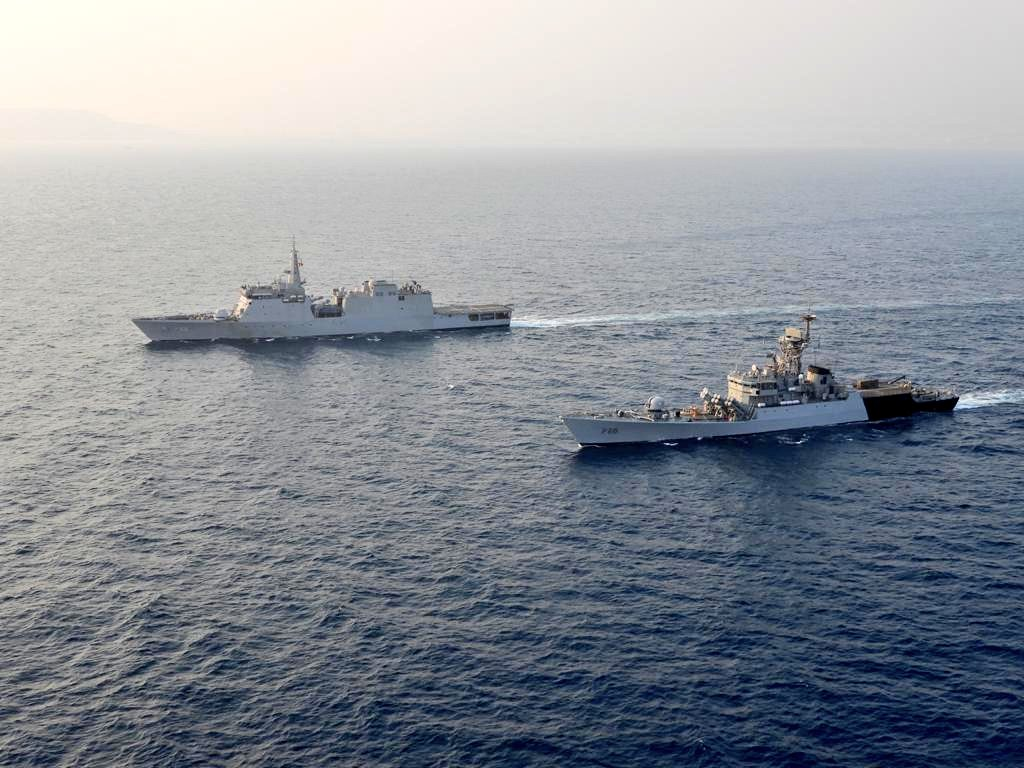
INS Kulish and INS Sumedha en route to Bangladesh

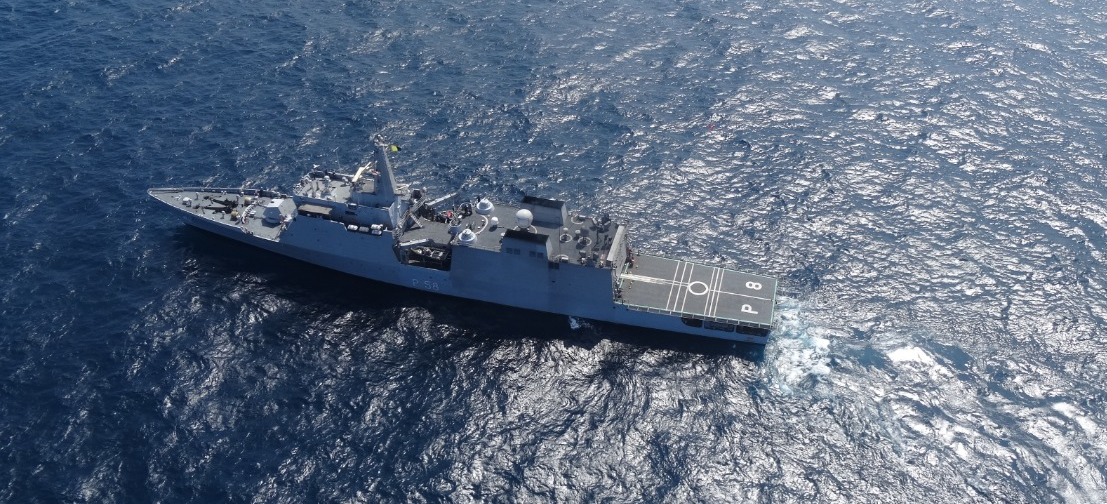
INS Sumedha (P58) en-route to Mongla, Bangladesh.

== See also ==
- Sukanya-class patrol vessel
