= Khashm el Girba =

Khashm el-Girba خشم القربة
- Town
- Location in Sudan
- Coordinates: 14°58′48″N 35°53′34″E
- Country: Sudan
- State: Kassala
- Time zone: UTC+2 (CAT)

Khashm el-Girba (Arabic: خشم القربة) is a town in Kassala State, north-eastern Sudan, located on the Atbarah River. The Khashm el-Girba Dam is located about 4 km (2 mi) south of the town.

== History ==
Some of the people in Khashm el-Girba were resettled from Wadi Halfa following the construction of the Aswan High Dam. More than 34,000 people were transported 800 miles southeast to Khashm el-Girba.

== Etymology ==
The name Khashm al-Qirbah is made up of two syllables "Khashm", meaning "mouth" in the Sudanese dialect, and "Qarbah", which is a container usually made of animal skin to carry water specifically during travel. Some have a number of Arabs nomads came to the water resource in the Setit River, one of the tributaries of the Atbara River, and drove their animals and took some water with them to continue their journeys and in the Khashm al-Qirba area before a group of the Hambata (bandits in the Sudanese deserts) met them and asked them to give it the water they carried, and when the Arabs refused that One of the bandits grabbed a calabash (a container to carry water) from what they were carrying and cut its mouth (meaning its mouth) with a knife, and the two teams clashed, and when people asked about the causes of the fighting, they were told that it was because of “the kharba blade”, and the battle site was later called Khashm al-Qirba.

There are those who cite another reason for calling the place this name, which is that the shape of the river and its curves give a shape similar to the shape of the gourd.

== Topography ==
Khashm al-Qirba is located on the dry savannah belt at a latitude of 14 degrees north, within the region of the Butana Plain, and the region is characterized by black clay soil and is split from the southeast side by the Atbara River, which stems from the Ethiopian and Eritrean highlands towards the eastern plains of Sudan, where it meets the two tributaries of the Setit River south of the city of Shawak. Which lies about 82 kilometers west of Khashm al-Qirba, and descends towards the northwest, where the large rocks continue to flow into the main Nile River at the city of Atbara. The river in the Khashm al-Qirba region is characterized by its steep slope and speed of flow, and it carries large quantities of silt and logs at its source and its course areas.

== Transport ==
Khashm is linked to the rest of Sudan's cities, including the country's capital Khartoum and the main port in Port Sudan by railway through the line coming from Khartoum, Wadi Medani and Gedaref, heading to Kassala and Port Sudan, and it is also linked by a highway with each of Gedaref, Kassala and New Halfa.

The town is served by Khashm el Girba Airport.
