= El Jaili =

Power station in Sudan

El Jaili is a power station located at Garri (80 km N of Khartoum), Sudan. The first unit was commissioned in 2003 and the last in 2007.

It is operated by the National Electricity Corporation of Sudan (NEC).

Garri4 is one of the thermal power plants connected to the national grid, with a total installed capacity of 460 MW of the country's total thermal electricity production. Sponge Coke, a byproduct of the Khartoum Refinery, is used to power this Power Plant Project.

== See also ==
- List of power stations in Sudan
