= India–Sudan relations =

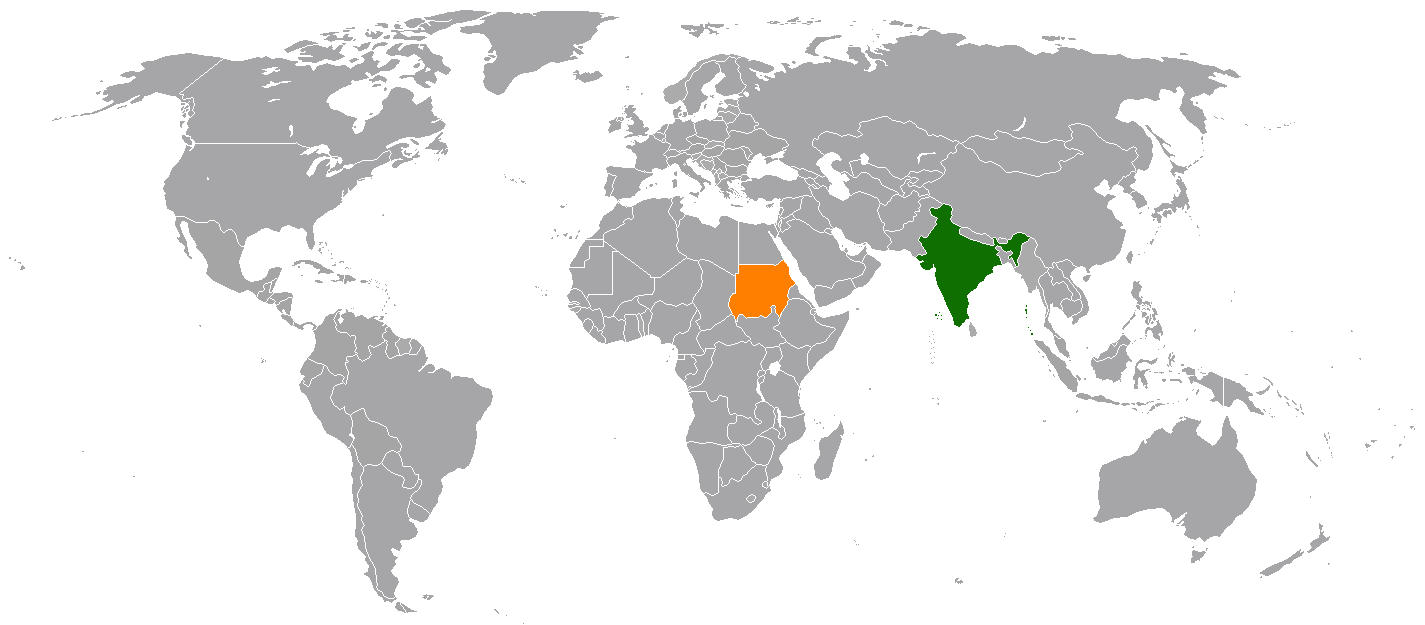

- India: Sudan

Diplomatic mission
- Embassy of India, Khartoum: Embassy of Sudan, New Delhi

India–Sudan relations (Hindi: भारत-सूडान संबंध; Arabic: العلاقات الهندية السودانية), also called Indian-Sudanese relations or Indo-Sudanese relations, refers to the international relations that exists between India and Sudan.

== History ==
Relations between India and Sudan date back to ancient times. Evidence indicated that there were contacts and possibly trade between Nubia and Indus Valley Civilizations via Mesopotamia. Evidence suggests that trade between Indian and Nubian kingdoms of Sudan via the Red Sea increased towards the end of the 12th century. Sennar, the capital of the Funj Sultanate, had an extensive silk, silver ornaments, leather and gold trade with India through Sawakin Port by 1699.

Two steel suspension rail bridges in Khartoum and Atbara were imported from India in the 1900s. These bridges are still in use today. Since 1900, Indian experts have been involved in the development of Sudan's forestry sector. Mahatma Gandhi visited the Port Sudan in 1935, on his way to England, and met with the members of the Indian diaspora in Sudan. Jawaharlal Nehru also stopped over in Port Sudan in 1938 on his way to the United Kingdom. Nehru visited the Chhotalal Samji Virani. The Graduates General Congress of Sudan, established in 1938, was greatly inspired by the Indian National Congress. The British Indian Army and Sudanese soldiers fought together in Eritrea in 1941. They secured victory in the decisive Battle of Keren, for which the Bengal Sappers were awarded the Victoria Cross for clearing mines in Metemma.

India's Chief Election Commissioner Sukumar Sen oversaw the first Sudanese parliamentary elections in 1953. The Sudanese Election Commission, established in 1957, drew inspiration from the Indian election laws and practices. India provided financial support to the Sudanization Committee established in February 1954, which was tasked with replacing British staff in the Sudanese government, post-independence. India opened its embassy in Khartoum in March 1955. Sudan's interim Prime Minister, Ismail al-Azhari, accompanied by several Ministers, visited New Delhi in April 1955 on their way to the Bandung Conference in Indonesia. At Bandung, the country did not have a flag to represent it. Indian Prime Minister Jawaharlal Nehru, who was also present at the Conference, wrote "Sudan" on his handkerchief and this was used to represent Sudan at Bandung.

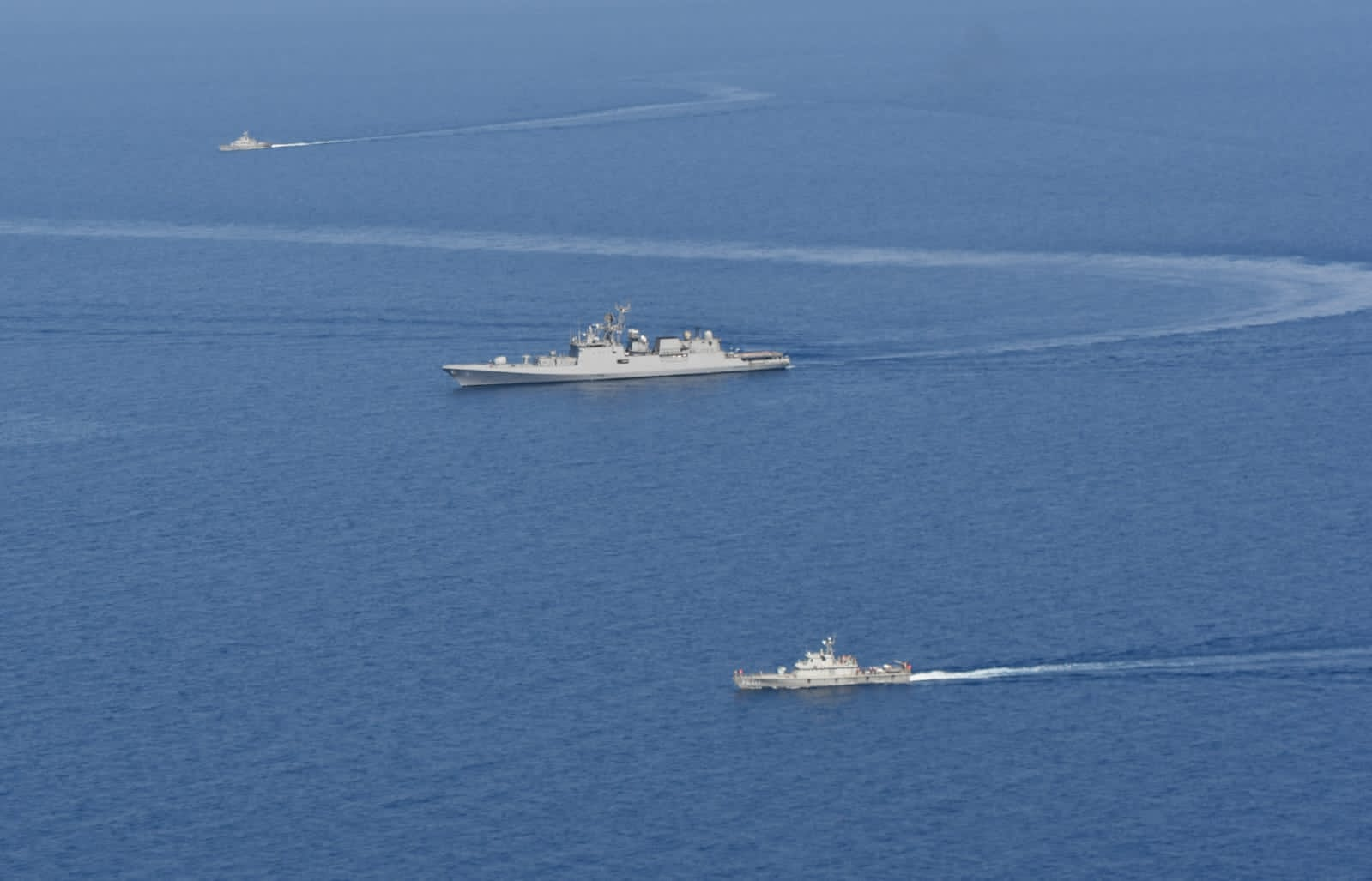
INS Tarkash sailing with Sudan Navy ships Almazz (PC 411) & Nimer (PC 413) as part of Maritime Partnership Exercise.

The Sudan Block at India's National Defence Academy was partially funded by the Government of Sudan. The Sudanese contributed 100,000 pounds towards the construction of the Block, in recognition of the sacrifices of Indian troops in the liberation of Sudan in the North African Campaign during World War II. India provided Sudan with a 6-acre plot in Chanakyapuri, New Delhi for the construction of an Embassy and associated residences in 1958. India operated an honorary consulate in Port Sudan, but closed it in the 1970s. India opened a Consulate General in Juba in August 2007. This would later become India's embassy to South Sudan following the latter's independence in 2011.

India remained neutral during the First Sudanese Civil War (1962–72) and the Second Sudanese Civil War (1983–2005). India voted against United Nations resolutions that criticised Sudan in 1993 and 1994. India also opposed attempts to force Sudan to withdraw from the International Monetary Fund in 1994.

In 2003, India's public-sector Oil and Natural Gas Corporation (ONGC) acquired a 25 percent share in Sudan's Greater Nile Petroleum Operating Company at a cost of US$650 million. The overseas investment arm of ONGC bought out Canada's Talisman Energy, which left Sudan as a result of criticism from human-rights groups and pressure from the government of Canada. As of 2011, Indian investment in the oil sector was about US$1 billion and expected to rise. This engagement also led to economic cooperation in other fields. The Export–Import Bank of India extended a US$50 million line of credit to Sudan in 2004. ONGC signed a contract in 2004 to build a 745-kilometer pipeline to carry petroleum derivatives from the Khartoum refinery to a new port on the Red Sea. As of 2011, India was scheduled to build part of a new railroad to Port Sudan. It was also in discussion with Sudan on training for the army, navy, and air force and on collaboration in the media and entertainment sector. India provided about 2,700 military personnel to UNMIS as of early 2011.

India supported Sudan during the Heglig Crisis in 2012.

== State visits ==
Prime Minister Jawaharlal Nehru visited Sudan in July 1957. Vice-president Zakir Hussain visited Khartoum in April 1963 and President Fakruddin Ali Ahmed visited the country in December 1975. Sudanese President Ismail al-Azhari visited India in 1967. Presidents Ibrahim Abboud visited India in 1964, Jaffer Nimeiri in 1974. President Omar al-Bashir visited India twice, in July 1999 and in July 2002. Indian President A. P. J. Abdul Kalam visited Sudan on 20–22 October 2003, the first visit by an Indian President to the country in 28 years. During the visit, Kalam met Sudanese President Bashir, addressed the Sudanese Parliament, and also spoke at the University of Khartoum.

== Economic relations ==
India is the second-largest exporter to Sudan, after China. Bilateral trade between the two countries totalled US$1.3 billion in 2013–14.

== Indian foreign aid ==
India donated tents and medicines to flood victims in Al Jazirah state in 1978, provided medicines to curb the leishmaniasis epidemic in South Sudan in 1983, and donated 22,560 tonnes of wheat in 1985 and 6,000 tonnes in 1987. India airlifted medicines to help Sudan in the aftermath of floods in Khartoum in 1996, and donated US$50,000 to victims of floods in Kasala in October 2003. In March 2005, India responded to the Sudanese government's request for food aid and offered 20,000 tons of wheat to the people of Darfur.

India pledged US$10 million towards infrastructure, capacity building, social sector projects such as the construction of hospitals and educational institutions in Sudan at the April 2005 Oslo Donors Conference. The Indian Ministry of Non-conventional Energy Sources (now known as the Ministry of New and Renewable Energy) provided funding for a solar electrification system in Khadarab village in April 2006. The system was set up by Central Electronics Limited. Similar systems have since been set up in other Sudanese villages with Indian funding. Between 1980 and 2014, India has extended about US$737.07 million in lines of credit.

State-owned ONGC Videsh Ltd established a school for special children, as well provided funding for sports equipment and prostheses. Following a request from the Shilluk community, the company donated an electricity generator to Kodok in the Upper Nile state. Indian firm Angelique International Ltd donated funds for the renovation of an Indian school in Kassala, and ONGC financed the renovation of the Indian Club in Port Sudan on 15 August 2007. In the same year, several Indian firms donated funds for the construction of a school in Kadugli. The work was carried out by a battalion of the Indian Army posted in Sudan. India donated tents and medicines worth US$100,000 to flood victims in Sudan in early 2008.

In February 2014, Sudan requested India to help develop its agricultural and renewable energy sectors. India provided Sudan with $350 million for the construction of a 500 MW Um-Dabakir Power Station in White Nile state, and $150 million to set up the Mushkur Sugar Plant being in the same region. According to then Indian Foreign Minister Salman Khurshid, the sugar plant "will earn Sudan valuable foreign exchange".

Citizens of Sudan are eligible for scholarships under the Indian Technical and Economic Cooperation Programme and the Indian Council for Cultural Relations. Sudanese diplomats routinely attend the Professional Course for Foreign Diplomats (PCFD), organized by the Ministry of External Affairs in New Delhi.

== Indians in Sudan ==
Gujarati trader Luvchand Amarchand Shah is believed to be the first Indian to settle in Sudan. Shah imported goods from India and traveled to Sudan via Aden in the early 1860s. The success and growth of his business led him to bring his relatives from Saurashtra to Sudan. These relatives in-turn invited more family and friends, leading to an increase in the Indian community in Sudan. Indians first settled in eastern Sudan, primarily Port Sudan and Suakin. Gradually, they began moving to the western regions of the country and settled in Omdurman, Kassala, Al Qadarif and Wad Medani.

== Indian evacuations during the Sudanese civil conflict ==
Asserting a risk to its nationals in Sudan, the Indian Army conducted a large scale evacuation operation called Operation Kaveri part of a multinational effort to under which the Indian government evacuated 3961 Indian and 136 foreign nationals.

Currently there may be around 100 to 200 odd Indians working or held against their will in various rebel held areas of Sudan. A video emerged on social media of an Indian man identified as Adarsh Behera, a plastic engineer from the state of Odisha who has been captured by RSF(Rapid Support Forces) militia in the Al Fashir region after it fell to the RSF forces. He was released after being held captive for over 60 days by the Rapid Support Forces militia and repatriated back Jagatsinghpur, Odisha. The RSF are known to have carried out large scale atrocities across El Fashir and also Bara city located in North Kordofan state due to the ongoing Sudani civil war sparking a major humanitarian crisis with increase in deaths of women & children, human trafficking and atrocities.

== Sudanese in India ==
As of 2013, an estimated 3000 Sudanese students study in universities in India, mainly in the cities of Pune, Mumbai, Hyderabad, Chennai and Bangalore. An estimated 30,000 Sudanese people have graduated from universities in India as of 2013.

== See also ==
- Embassy of India, Khartoum
- India–South Sudan relations
