= Operation Kaveri =

Operation organized by the Indian Army (2023)

- Part of the Evacuation of foreign nationals during the 2023 Sudan conflict and Battle of Khartoum
- Operational scope: Humanitarian relief
- Type: Emergency evacuation
- Planned by: Indian Armed Forces and Ministry of External Affairs
- Commanded by: General
- Objective: Evacuation of Indian citizens from Sudan
- Date: 24 April — 5 May 2023
- Executed by: Indian Armed Forces
- Outcome: Nearly 3,862 evacuated as of 5 May 2023.

Operation Kaveri (Hindi: कावेरी romanized: Kaveri, lit. Kaveri River) was an operation conducted by the Indian Armed Forces to evacuate Indian citizens and foreign nationals from Sudan during the 2023 Sudan conflict. The evacuation was conducted by air and sea, most likely in Port Sudan where most of the evacuations were done by Indian Navy through INS Sumedha. The operation was conducted for the evacuations of thousands of Indians in Sudan, primarily in Khartoum, the capital of the country.

== Background ==
The history of conflicts in Sudan has consisted of foreign invasions and resistance, ethnic tensions, religious disputes, and competition over resources. In its modern history, two civil wars between the central government and the southern regions killed 1.5 million people, and a continuing conflict in the western region of Darfur has displaced two million people and killed more than 200,000 people. Since independence in 1956, Sudan has had more than fifteen military coups and it has also been ruled by the military for the majority of the republic's existence, with only brief periods of democratic civilian parliamentary rule.

On 15 April 2023, the RSF launched a surprise attack on multiple Sudanese Army bases across the country, including in the capital Khartoum. At 12:00 (CAT), RSF forces claimed to have captured Khartoum International Airport, Merowe Airport, El Obeid Airport as well as a base in Soba. Clashes between RSF and the Army erupted at the Presidential Palace and at the residence of General al-Burhan, with both sides claiming control over the two sites.

== Operation ==
India announced the start of Operation Kaveri on 25 April 2023 as 500 Indians were reported in Port Sudan.

On 24 April, External Affairs Ministry said two C-130J aircraft and Garud Commando Force operatives of the Indian Air Force were on standby in Jeddah, Saudi Arabia as part of preparations for evacuation, while the Indian Navy's INS Sumedha had reached Port Sudan.

On 25 April, 278 Indians were transported by sea to INS Sumedha.

On the night of April 27–28, a C-130J aircraft of the Indian Air Force with 121 Indians took off from Wadi Seidna Air Base. The flight was dangerous, as fighting was going on in this area (later a Turkish plane would come under fire here). Approaching the airstrip, the IAF pilots used their onboard electro-optical and infrared sensors to ensure that the runway was free of obstructions and no inimical forces were in the vicinity. The pilots used night vision goggles. On landing, the aircraft engines were kept running while eight IAF Garud commandos located, verified and secured the passengers and their luggage into the aircraft.

A total of 754 Indian citizens were evacuated on 28 April. Among those rescued was an employee of the French diplomatic mission, as well as his family.

Nearly 2,400 Indian citizens evacuated from Sudan as of 29 April 2023.

Nearly 231 Indian citizens (most of them from Gujarat) were evacuated from Sudan on 2 May 2023.

India completed the evacuation of Hakki Pikki tribe members of Karnataka from Sudan. The Indian evacuees including the Hakki Pikki tribes were housed in a school in Port Sudan, before being flown to Jeddah.

== See also ==
- India–Sudan relations
- Operation Raahat
- Sudanese refugee crisis (2023–present)
- Operation Ajay
