= Shereyk Power Station =

Hydroelectric power station in Sudan

- Country: Sudan
- Location: Sudan
- Status: Proposed

Thermal power station
- Primary fuel: Hydropower

Power generation
- Nameplate capacity: 350 MW (470,000 hp)

The Shereyk Power Station is a proposed hydroelectric power plant of the River Nile in Sudan. It has a power generating capacity of 350 megawatts (470,000 hp) enough to power over 235,000 homes
