= Sumedha =

Mythological figure, regarded as a previous life of the Buddha

Ascetic Sumedha
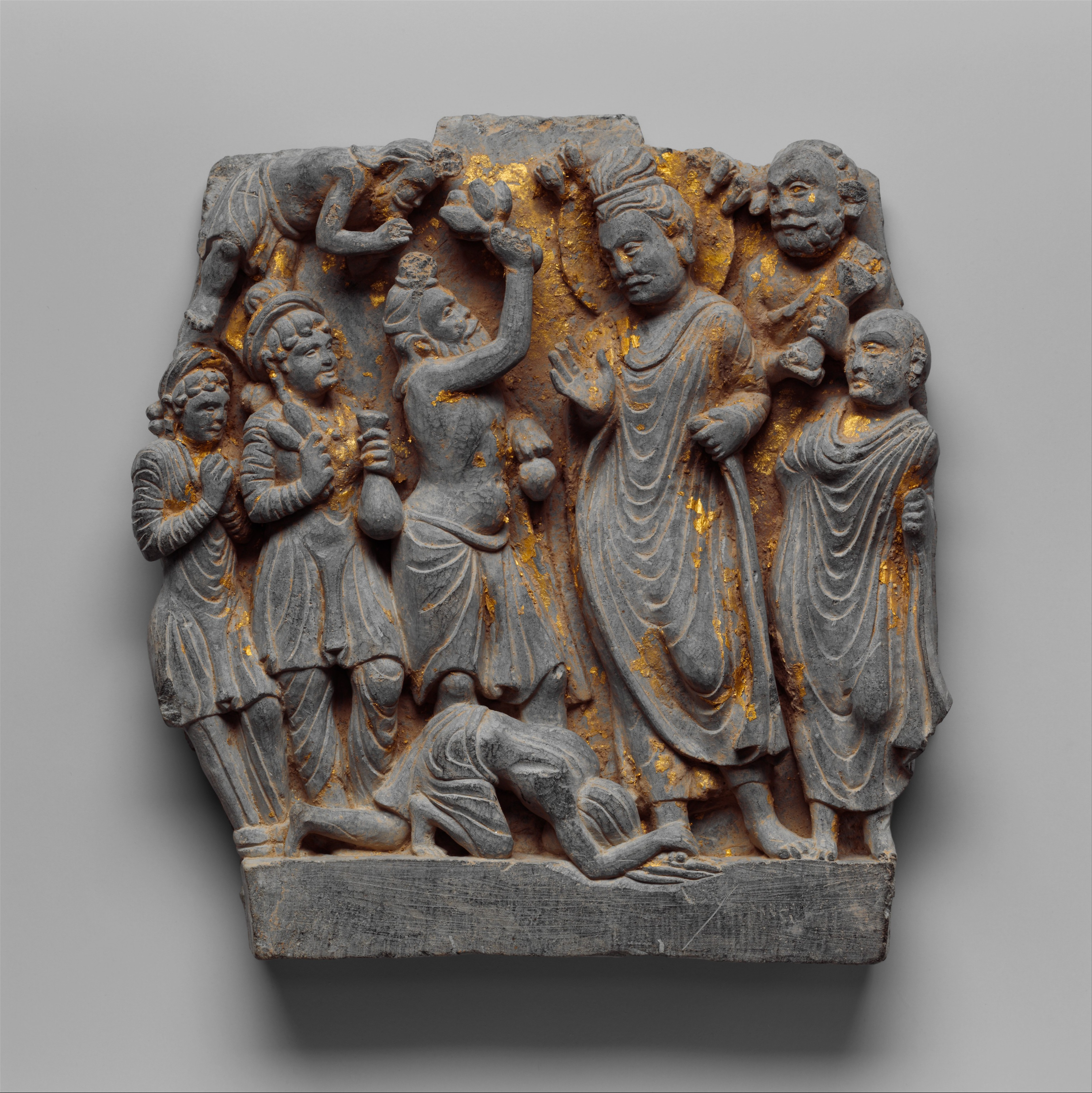
- Sumedha and Dīpankara Buddha, second century, Gandhāra. The ascetic Sumedha appears three times: first, standing before the Buddha Dipankara throwing flowers; second, prostrate before the Buddha spreading his matted locks over mud; and third, flying in the upper left of the panel in a gesture of veneration.

Personal life
- Home town: Amaravatī, India
- Education: Vedic
- Known for: The previous life of Gotama Buddha, when he first declared the wish to become a Buddha

Religious life
- Religion: Buddhism

Senior posting
- Teacher: Dīpankara Buddha

In Buddhist texts, Sumedha is a previous life of Gotama Buddha (Pāli; Sanskrit: Gautama) in which he declares his intention to become a Buddha. Buddhist texts describe that this takes place when Gotama Buddha is still a Buddha-to-be (Pali: bodhisatta, Sanskrit: bodhisattva). Traditions regard Sumedha's life as the beginning of the spiritual journey leading up to the attainment of Buddhahood by Gotama in his last life, a journey which takes place through many lifetimes. Born in a brahmin family, Sumedha begins to live as an ascetic in the mountains. One day he meets Dīpankara Buddha (Sanskrit: Dīpaṃkara) and offers his own body for him to walk over. During this sacrifice, he makes a vow that he also will be a Buddha in a future lifetime, which is confirmed by Dīpankara through a prophecy.

The encounter between Sumedha and Dīpankara Buddha is the oldest Buddhist story known which deals with the path of a bodhisatta, and the story has been described as the Theravādin interpretation of this ideal. It is the most detailed story of a previous life of the Buddha, and is one of the most popular stories in Buddhist art. It is depicted in many Theravādin temples and is at least alluded to in innumerable Buddhist works. Sumedha's story has often been raised by Theravāda Buddhists as an example of selfless service.

== Origins ==
The accounts of Sumedha and Dīpankara Buddha have been connected to the area northwest of India.

Sumedha's life is described in the Pāli Buddhavaṃsa and Jātaka, the latter being based on the former. The Sanskrit textual traditions relate Sumedha's life as well. The Sanskrit tradition accounts are very similar to those of the Pāli, which has led Indologists Kenneth Norman and Richard Gombrich to argue that the accounts can be dated back to pre-sectarian Buddhism, possibly as early as a century after the Buddha. On the other hand, Buddhist studies scholar Jan Nattier argues that Dīpankara Buddha's absence in the earliest Pāli discourses (Pali: sutta, Sanskrit: sūtra) indicates that traditions about Dīpankara only became current several centuries after the Buddha. Buddhist studies scholar Naomi Appleton states parts of the biographical material were "fixed no later than the sixth century CE".

Chinese Buddhist pilgrims such as Faxian (337 – c.422 CE) identified the place where Sumedha would have met Dīpankara Buddha as Nagarāhāra (Afghanistan), now called Nangarhar. Faxian reported a shrine for Dīpankara there: apparently, it was important for Gandhāran Buddhists to claim that their country was the origin of Gotama Buddha's spiritual life. Since most of the depictions of Sumedha's account have been found in the area northwest of India, especially Gandhāra, it has been suggested that the story developed there. However, the motif of the spreading of hair has also been found in the Ajantā and Nālandā areas, and there is some evidence that the story was common in Ajantā.

Buddhist studies scholar Karen Derris has pointed out that the Buddhavaṃsa has received relatively little scholarly attention, due to mainstream scholars' focus on early Pāli texts and being prejudiced against mythological accounts of later origin.

== Accounts ==
=== Early life ===
Translations of Sumedha
- Sanskrit: Sumati, (Su)megha
- Pali: Sumedha (~paṇḍita, ~tāpasa)
- Burmese: သုမေဓာ
- Chinese: 善慧 (Pinyin: Shanhui)
- Japanese: 善慧 (Rōmaji: Zen'e)
- Korean: 善慧 (RR: Sŏnhye)
- Tibetan: མཁས་པ་བློ་གྲོས་བཟན་པོ་དཀའ་ཐུབ་པ་ (mkhas pa blo gros bzaṅ po dka' thub pa)
- Thai: สุเมธดาบส (RTGS: Sumetdabot)
- Vietnamese: Thiện Huệ

In the Pāli texts, Sumedha is said to have lived four "incalculable eons" and a hundred thousand normal eons ago. In what most texts describe as Gotama Buddha's own memories, an account is given of Sumedha's life, in the voice of the first person. Sumedha is born in Amaravatī in a brahmin family of noble birth. (Note: See Malalasekera (1960, Sumedha). For the noble birth, see Zhang (2017, p. 27).) After having grown up, he realizes that life is full of suffering such as sickness and death, and he sets out to find a "state beyond death". (Note: See Lopez (2013, p. 1) and Lopez, D.S. (8 March 2019). "Buddha - Biography & Facts". Encyclopedia Britannica. The 2013 monograph specifies the types of suffering.) He realizes he cannot take his wealth in the afterlife and therefore donates it all, becoming a type of ascetic wearing matted hair (Pali: jaṭila). (Note: See Lopez, D.S. (8 March 2019). "Buddha - Biography & Facts". Encyclopedia Britannica, and Crosby (2013b, The Changing Character of the Buddha). Lopez mentions the matted hair.) He begins to live on the Dhammaka mountain, in the Himalayas. He starts to observe strict discipline, choosing only to live under trees and live on fruits. The texts say that his self-cultivation helps him to attain "the highest knowledge" and develop "great yogic power" like flying. (Note: For the knowledge, see Penner (2009, p. 9). For the power, see Buswell & Lopez (2014, Sumedha) and Lopez (2013, p. 1).) He is depicted as being so immersed in yogic practice, that he does not notice the portents that a Buddha has arisen in the world. (Note: The texts say that an earthquake took place at the moment of Prince Siddhattha's enlightenment as a Buddha. Other portents are also listed, such as animals that were once hostile living in harmony.)

=== Encounter with Dīpankara Buddha ===
One day, while traveling to the city of Rammavatī, he sees people preparing a road for Dīpankara Buddha to travel on, Dīpankara being the first of twenty-four Buddhas that Sumedha will meet before becoming a Buddha himself. Being joyful on hearing the word buddha, Sumedha takes responsibility for a part of the road which has not been done yet, but he does not manage to finish it in time for Dīpankara. (Note: For the passage of hearing the word, see Lopez, D.S. (8 March 2019). "Buddha - Biography & Facts". Encyclopedia Britannica. For the details of the road, see Malalasekera (1960, Sumedha).) Since he does not want to use his psychic powers to repair the road, Sumedha prostrates himself in the mud in front of Dīpankara Buddha and his following as a human bridge. (Note: See Crosby (2013b, The Changing Character of the Buddha) and Hudson, Gutman & Maung (2018, p. 11). Crosby mentions the psychic powers.) (Note: Buddhist studies scholar Bhikkhu Anālayo points out that the motif of lying in the mud as a human bridge can already be found in the early Pāli texts and Āgamas.) He spreads his hair, his deer skin and bark garment on the mud to cover it fully. Later texts would come to see this is an advanced stage in the development of Gotama, the Buddha-to-be, in that he fully dedicates himself to Buddhahood, not only in mind and in speech, but also physically. In this manner, he pays homage to Dīpankara Buddha and helps him and the monks to cross the mud unsullied. This is regarded as a sacrifice of Sumedha's life, in that it entails many monks walking over him, and him possibly dying in the process. While doing so, Sumedha then pronounces a specific vow (Pali: abhinihāra; Sanskrit: pūrvapraṇidhāna) that in the future he too will become a Buddha.

Before walking over Sumedha's body, Dīpankara stops before him and makes a prophecy (Pali: veyyakaraṇa, Sanskrit: vyākaraṇa) that Sumedha's wish will come true in a future lifetime: he will then become the Buddha called Sākyamuni (Sanskrit: Śākyamuni). (Note: See Williams, Paul (2005). "Bodhisattva Path". Encyclopedia of Religion. Thomson Gale, Gombrich (2012, p. 101) and Strong (2001, p. 25). Gombrich mentions that Dīpankara makes the prophecy before walking over him.) Dīpankara also mentions several details of the future Buddha's life, such as the names of his parents and main disciples. When Dīpankara makes this statement, many devotees who believe they cannot yet attain enlightenment under Dīpankara vow that they will attain it under the next Buddha, Sākyamuni. After the prediction, with Sumedha still lying in the mud, Dīpankara Buddha and his following of monks circumambulate around Sumedha, and in some stories offer flowers, as a sign of respect and to celebrate Sumedha's future Buddhahood. Meanwhile, deities are depicted as approving of the prophecy, like a "divine chorus that give notice of his pending buddhahood", a subservient role typical for Buddhist cosmology. The text reveals that many of the onlookers later become followers of Gotama Buddha in his final lifetime, after his enlightenment, according to the wish they made. Specifically, they are reborn as the disciples called the Kassapa Brothers (Sanskrit: Kāśyapa), and their followers. The motif that people who formerly encountered Dīpankara Buddha become enlightened under another Buddha Gotama indicates that each Buddha is regarded as continuing upon the work left unfinished by the previous Buddhas.

=== Response to the prophecy ===
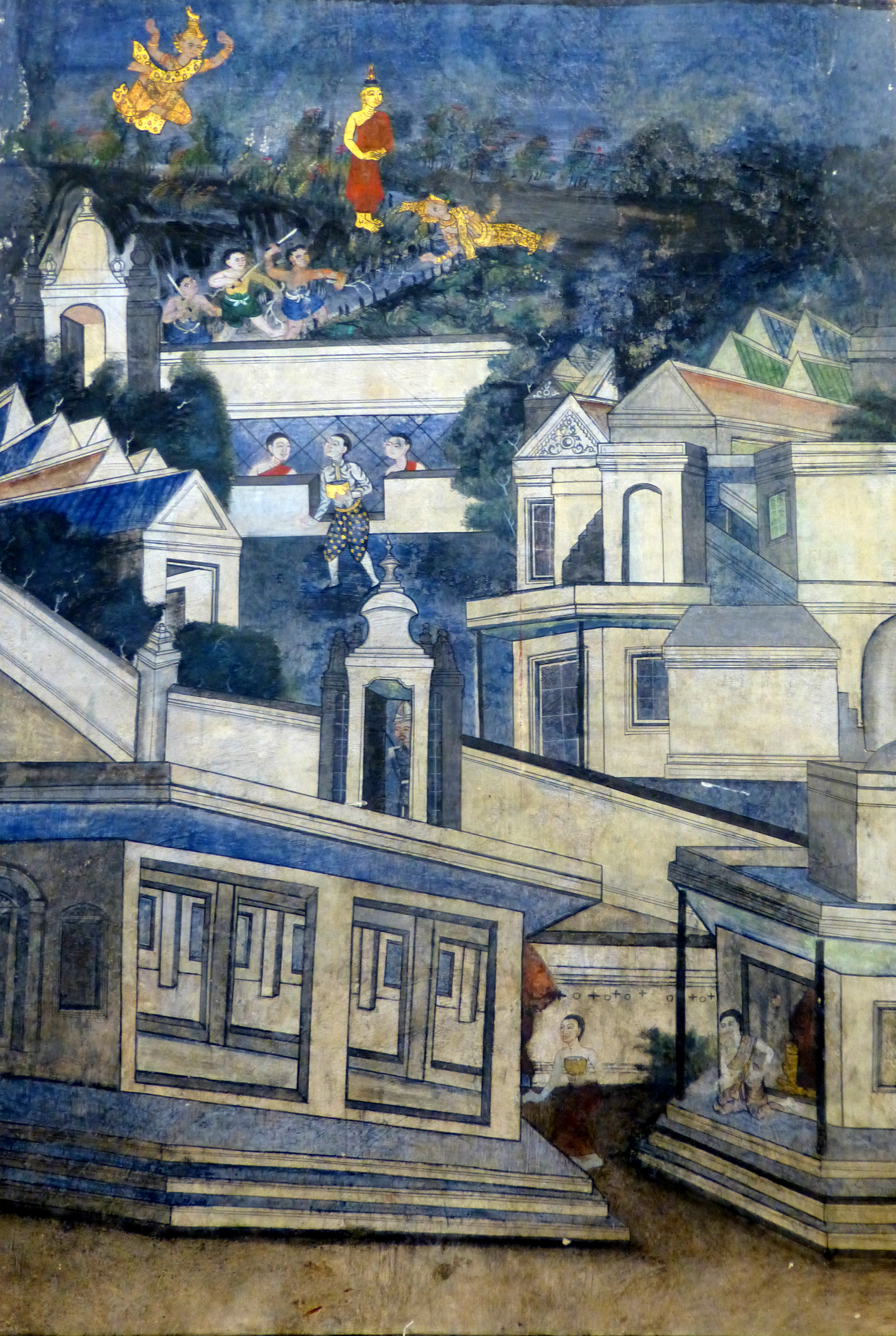
Sumedha and the Buddha Dīpankara near the city. Produced in Thailand

Sumedha makes his vow as a Buddha-to-be (Pali: bodhisatta, Sanskrit: bodhisattva) because of the concern he has with other living beings. The story relates that Sumedha could have attained personal enlightenment at the time of meeting Dīpankara, but chooses to strive to become a Buddha instead. Inspired by Dīpankara's example, he feels he has the duty to strive for the highest accomplishment, to become a Buddha. After the prophecy is made, Sumedha reflects on the qualities he needs to accomplish Buddhahood called the 'perfections' (Pali: pāramī; Sanskrit: pāramitā), and concludes which are most important, beginning with the perfection of giving. (Note: See Malalasekera (1960, Bodhisatta) and Crosby (2013b, The Changing Character of the Buddha). Crosby mentions giving.) With Sumedha having reflected on these perfections, an earthquake follows: in Buddhist studies scholar Kate Crosby's words, "the whole universe confirms the future success of his vow". This causes panic among the inhabitants, but Dīpankara explains to them there is no reason for dismay. The texts conclude with Sumedha returning to the Himalayas.

Sumedha continues his spiritual journey through many lifetimes, "millions of lifetimes and billions of years". Every time he meets another Buddha, he performs an act of devotion and renews his bodhisatta vow to become one himself. (Note: For the act of devotion, see Shulman (2017, p. 178). For the renewal of the vow, see Williams, Paul (2005). "Bodhisattva Path". Encyclopedia of Religion. Thomson Gale, and Appleton (2012, p. 6).) All the while, he develops his perfections further, as each of the Buddhas he meets inspires him to pursue Buddhahood further, and in the process, adds something unique to the Buddha-to-be's identity. Traditionally, the rest of the Jātakas are also understood to depict the period between Sumedha's bodhisatta vow and his eventual enlightenment as a Buddha. One of the more well-known tales of a previous life is that of Prince Vessantara (Sanskrit: Viśvantara), part of the Jātaka collection, who famously gives his wealth, wife and children away to attain Buddhahood.

=== Other motifs ===
In several Chinese Buddhist texts, as well as the Sanskrit Mahāvastu, Sumedha is called Megha. In several other Chinese and Sanskrit texts, including the Divyavadāna, he is called Sumati. The spelling Sumegha also occurs.

In the Pāli Apadāna and Āgamas, Sumedha receives (or buys) blue lotus flowers from a young brahmin girl called Sumittā; he later offers the flowers to Dīpankara Buddha, throwing them in the air. (Note: See Malalasekera (1960, Rāhulamātā), Hudson, Gutman & Maung (2018, p. 10) and Zhang (2017, p. 24). Zhang specifies the type of flower.) Sumittā takes a vow that she may be reborn as the wife of Sumedha in a future life, which is confirmed by a prediction by Dīpankara Buddha. Later, Sumittā is reborn as Yasodharā (Sanskrit: Yaśodharā), the wife of Prince Siddhattha who later becomes Gotama Buddha. In some versions of the story, Yasodharā only gives the flowers to Sumedha on the condition that he join her in pledging to be reborn as a couple in future lives. (Note: Some accounts relate that the king bought all the flowers himself to offer to Buddha Dīpankara, thus leaving no flowers for others to offer.) Yasodharā is depicted in many Gandhāran bas reliefs and statues, alongside Sumedha (and Dīpankara Buddha). (Note: See Kumari (2012, p. 166) and Matsumura (2011, pp. 111–2). Matsumura specifies the type of epigraphic findings.) In the Apadāna, the Divyāvadāna and the Mahāvastu, Sumedha also has a friend called Meghadatta or Mati. The texts relate that the friend does much bad karma and is reborn in hell for many lifetimes as a result. He is reborn in the time of Gotama Buddha as his disciple Dhammaruci (Sanskrit: Dharmaruci).

Medieval post-canonical Pāli texts from Burmese, Thai, Sinhalese and Khün vernacular traditions describe an even earlier period in the spiritual path of Gotama Buddha, relating about lives even prior to that of Sumedha, during which he not yet received confirmations of his vow from other Buddhas. (Note: See Strong (2001, p. 23) and Derris (2000, pp. 3–5). Only Derris mentions traditions outside of Thailand.) In this "pre-Sumedha" narrative tradition, the encounter between Sumedha and Dīpankara is seen as an advanced stage on the spiritual path of Gotama Buddha, as opposed to a beginning. These narratives depict a more gradual process of development, and do not regard the beginning of the spiritual path of Gotama Buddha as a single, revolutionary event. Because of that, they offer a perspective which diminishes the importance of the encounter between Sumedha and Buddha Dīpankara. For example, the Paññāsa Jātaka collection that circulated in Southeast Asia relates about a previous life of Sumedha, in the time of a previous Buddha also called Dīpankara. In this lifetime, Sumedha already has the wish to become a Buddha, but cannot receive the prophecy from this Dīpankara Buddha, because in this lifetime Sumedha is a woman. This Dīpankara hears of the woman's wish, who is his stepsister, and lets her know that she will be able to receive the prediction later, when she is born as the male Sumedha during the time of the next Dīpankara. There is debate among scholars whether this story should be interpreted as empowering women to become bodhisattas, or affirming the status quo of women being unable to access the bodhisatta path.

Archaeologist Maurizio Taddei has noted that in many Gandharan art depictions, Sumedha's life is linked to that of Rāhula, the son of the Buddha. The Buddha giving his spiritual heritage to his son is compared to that of Sumedha allowing the Buddha Dīpankara to walk over him, and Dīpankara making the prophecy. Both the figure of Gotama Buddha giving his inheritance to his son, and the figure of Dīpankara Buddha giving his inheritance of Buddhahood to Sumedha are depicted with flames emitting from their bodies; both scenes are depictions of inheritance, filial and disciple piety; both may have been considered by fifth-century Buddhists to be representations of "eager youth".

== Textual interpretation ==
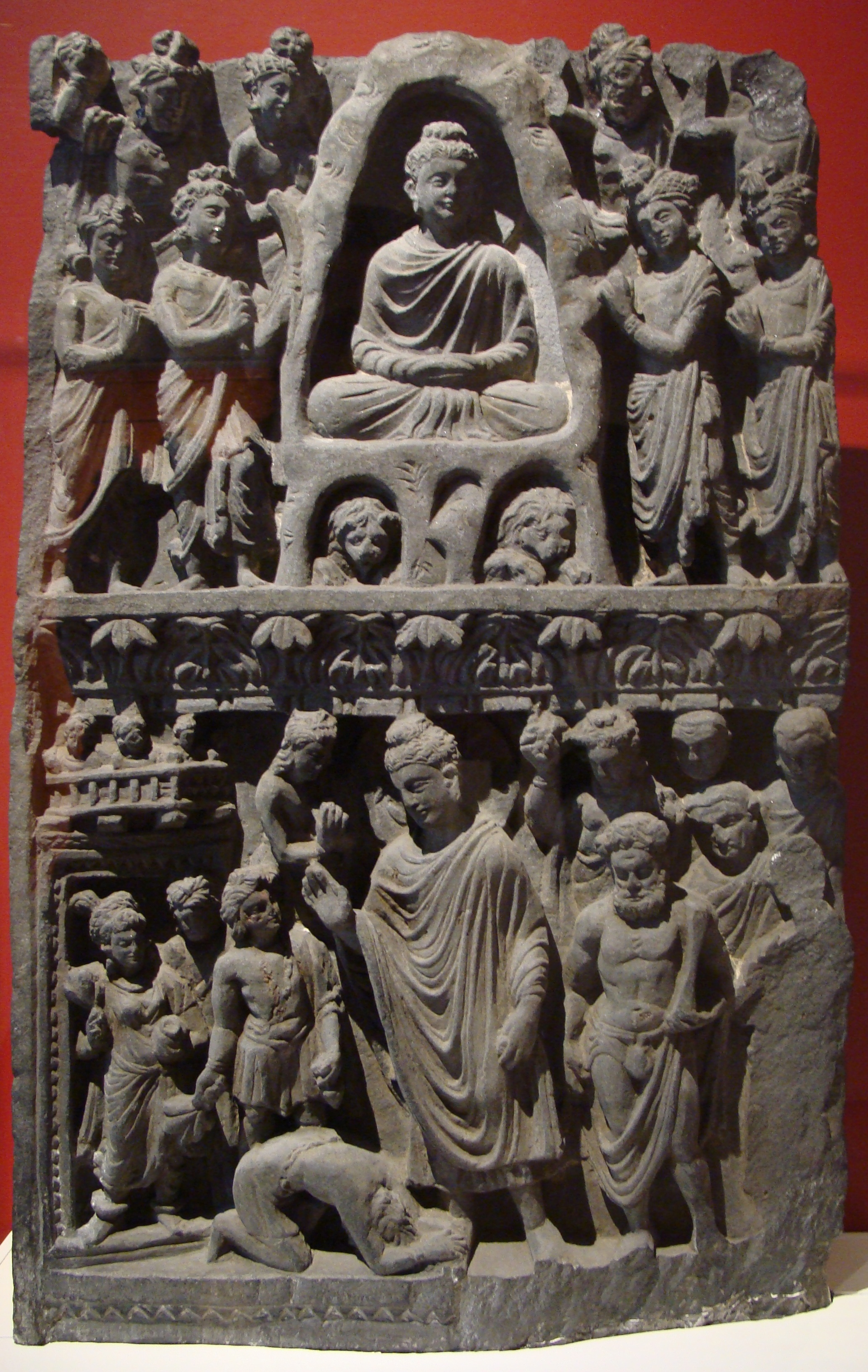
Relief with Buddha Gotama meditating (top) and Buddha Dīpankara meeting Sumedha (bottom), Gandharan region, Kushan period, second–third century CE

Sumedha is a powerful spiritual figure, who is depicted as striving with willpower to attain the reality beyond painful rebirth, and in the process is willing to discard his "filthy" body for the higher good. The story of the encounter is meant to evoke respect for Gotama Buddha, but also meant as an encouragement for those who strive for enlightenment in a future lifetime. It could have been used to encourage devotees to aspire to be reborn under Metteyya (Sanskrit: Maitreya), believed by Buddhists to be the future Buddha. Furthermore, the story of Sumedha, as well as many Jātaka stories, indicate that the path of a Buddha-to-be is superior and more heroic than that of striving for only personal enlightenment. The story of Sumedha meeting Dīpankara has a "strong devotional ethos".

Through the motif of the prophecy, Dīpankara not only shows his "complete cognizance of cosmos"—in the words of comparative religion scholar Eviatar Shulman—but also that the Buddha Gotama and the Buddhas that have preceded him, are "ultimately of the same substance". Sumedha is depicted as the "Buddha seed" (Pali: buddhabhījaṅgura) that will eventually develop into a fully enlightened Buddha, just like all the other Buddhas. Thus, Sumedha's prophecy not only shows the future personal attainment of Gotama Buddha, but also reveals a "cosmic structure". The story of Sumedha shows that "buddhas make other buddhas", or as Buddhist studies scholar Steven Collins puts it, "[e]ach Buddha is connected with others, in a complex and interwoven pattern of predictions and recollections". In addition, Sumedha's sacrifice of his body as a sort of bridge can be interpreted as a symbol for the passing of Buddhism from one age to the next.

Since Dīpankara's approval of Sumedha is a pattern that occurs with every Buddha before attaining Buddhahood, it becomes "paradigmatic and reoccurring". It can therefore be regarded as "sacred time" in contrast with profane, single events, following the theory of historian Mircea Eliade. Collins does point out that Sumedha's account in the Buddhavaṃsa depicts both repetitive and non-repetitive time: though the paths of the bodhisattas and Buddhas are depicted as repetitive in nature, time in the cycle of rebirth of living beings is described as a continuous flowing river, where living beings can reach salvation under a certain Buddha and thereby reach "the further shore of nirvana" and no longer be reborn. Derris adds that in the narratives about Dīpankara's prediction there is a "shimmering temporal landscape", in which the Buddha-to-be Sumedha is to some extent already the Buddha. Words like Jina (lit. 'conqueror') and Tathāgatha are applied to him, which are epithets of an already enlightened Buddha. This indicates how certain the prediction was seen to be.

Post-canonical Pāli works, Sanskrit works such as the Mahāvastu, as well as Sarvāstivāda and Mūla-sārvastivāda commentaries describe that a Buddha-to-be must go through several stages before becoming a Buddha: the "natural stage", before conceiving the wish to become a Buddha; the stage of taking a vow to become one; and the stage of living in agreement with that vow, fulfilling the perfections. (Note: See Williams, Paul (2005). "Bodhisattva Path". Encyclopedia of Religion. Thomson Gale, Samuels (1997, p. 414 note 52) and Drewes (2017, p. 5). Drewes mentions the Sarvāstivāda and Mūla-sarvāstivāda commentaries.) At the fourth stage, the Buddha-to-be is declared to have an irreversible destination as a Buddha, provided the Buddha-to-be makes a correct vow. Among qualities needed for that vow to succeed, the commentary of the Jātaka states that the Buddha-to-be must fulfill eight conditions, among which having extreme willpower and being male. (Note: See Harvey (2000, p. 373) and Appleton (2011, p. 37). Appleton mentions all eight conditions.) These conditions are only found in the Theravāda texts. Buddhist studies scholar Peter Harvey does add, though, that the condition of being male only holds for becoming a Buddha, but not for becoming an enlightened disciple of a Buddha. In the Pāli tradition, therefore, this condition has hardly any practical consequences, because Buddhahood is seen as open for very few individuals, and most people aim to attain enlightenment as a disciple instead. Most scholars agree that the Pāli Canon does not describe the bodhisatta path as open for every individual, and that the Pāli texts differ in this respect from Mahāyāna Buddhism, in which the path of Buddhahood is regarded as open for all. A number of scholars have argued that there is no such difference, however.

== Role in Buddhism ==
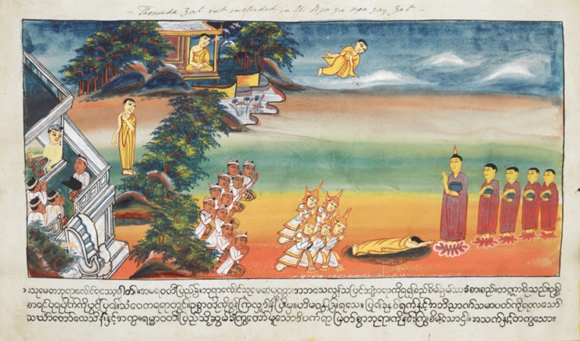
Sumedha and Dīpankara Buddha. Burmese manuscript, British Library

In the Theravāda tradition, the story is usually regarded as the beginning of the Buddha's spiritual path, and is included in the first part (Pali: Dūre-nidāna, lit. 'Distant Epoch') in most traditional accounts about the Buddha's life. The model for this organization of information was the Buddhavaṃsa, and the Nidānakathā, part of the commentary on the Jātakas, in which the Dūre takes up half of the account. (Note: See Prebish, Charles (2005). "Buddha". Encyclopedia of Religion. Thomson Gale, Gombrich (2012, p. 118) and Derris (2000, p. 3). Gombrich points out that the Dūre amounts to half of the Nidānakathā.) The story of Sumedha attempts to establish a relation between Gotama Buddha and a lineage of predecessors, thus legitimizing the message of the Buddha, and describing a "pre-enlightenment training". This is comparable to how an Indian king was anointed by his predecessor, and therefore conforms to Indian beliefs. Indeed, the medieval Pāli Jīnalaṅkāra dubs Dīpankara's prophecy "a great consecration", consecration referring to anointment of kings (Pali: mahābhiseka).

The story is the longest and most detailed account about a previous life of the Buddha, and serves as the model for other such accounts. It is the oldest known Buddhist story about the path of a bodhisatta, and it forms the oldest instance in the Pāli tradition of the altruistic bodhisatta rationale, depicting a person aiming for the enlightenment of other living beings. Indeed, the story has been dubbed "a concise Theravādin reformulation of the Mahāyāna bodhisattva ideal", as it deals with the very question of what it means to be a Buddha-to-be. The story defines the role of the bodhisatta path within Theravādin Buddhist doctrine and terminology in a revolutionary manner, using new terms like 'prediction' (Pali: vyākaraṇa), 'aspiration' (Pali: abhinīhāra) and 'service, meritorious act' (Pali: adhikāra). The Jātakanidāna describes the personal relationship between a Buddha and a bodhisatta within the Theravādin doctrine and normalizes, incorporates and integrates the bodhisatta in its structure. Scholar Juyan Zhang argues that accounts about Sumedha in the Ekottara Āgama and Jātaka Nidāna may have formed a prototype for the later Mahāyāna mythology and iconography of the bodhisattva Avalokiteśvara, developing from the fifth century CE. Buddhist studies scholars Hikata Ryushō and Shizutani Masao believe the story of Sumedha to be part of "primitive Mahāyāna", the earliest stage in the development of Mahāyāna Buddhism, but archaeologist Rhi Juhyung believes the evidence is not yet definitive.

The story of Sumedha's encounter with Dīpankara Buddha is one of the most popular in Buddhist art. It is depicted in many Theravādin temples and is at least alluded to in a huge amount of religious works. Indeed, in Theravādin Buddhist culture, the story of Sumedha, as well as hat of Vessantara, is as important as the final life of Gotama Buddha, and in some countries, Sumedha's story is included in children's books about the Buddha. (Note: See Matsumura (2011, p. 1137). For the importance in Theravāda, see Gombrich (2006, p. 122). For the children books, see Schober (1988, p. 22 note 19).) The story of Sumedha's encounter with Dīpankara has been much depicted in Buddhist art. In depictions of rebirth narratives in Gandhāran art, the story dominates and has an "extraordinary" position in the iconography of Gandhāran monuments with relics (stūpas). It is often depicted integrated with the present life of the Buddha and is as at least as often depicted as key events in the Buddha's last life. The reason why the story was less influential outside of Gandhāra may have been because Vessantara's story was more popular there, Vessantara providing both a model in terms of spirituality and kingship.

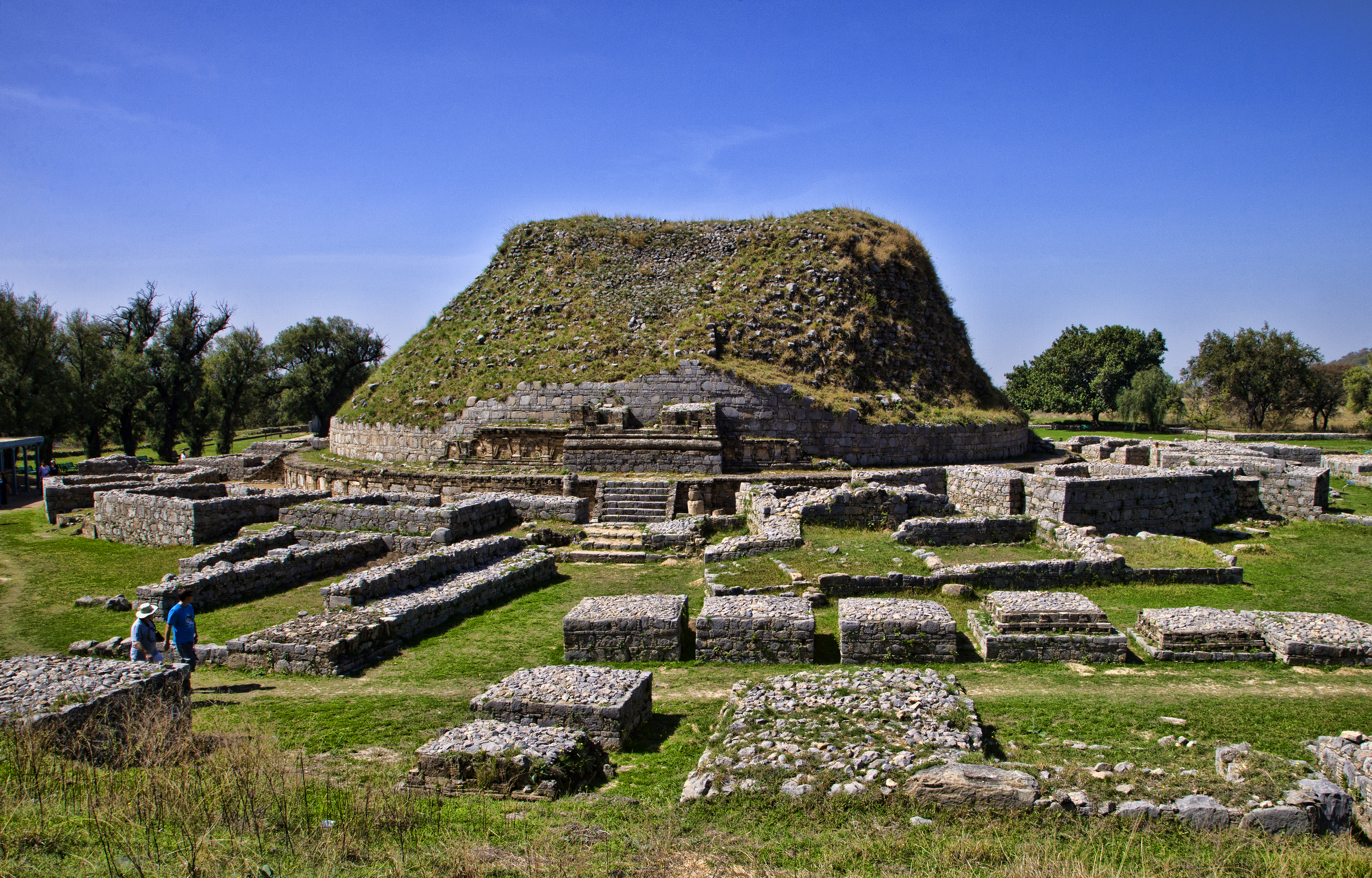
The Dharmarajika stupa in Taxila, Pakistan. Buddhist studies scholar John S. Strong argues that some accounts of Sumedha's life indicate a historical development toward a relic cult of bodhisattas.

In the texts of monastic discipline of the Dharmaguptaka textual tradition, Sumedha receives the prediction of his future Buddhahood and flies away into the air. His hair, however, remains on the ground, still spread out, but now detached from his body. Dīpankara warns his disciples not to step on the hair. Hundreds of thousands of persons then come and make offerings of flowers and perfumes to the hair. In some versions of the story, such as in the Divyavadāna, stūpas are built by local kings to enshrine the hairs. Buddhist studies scholar John S. Strong argues that these accounts indicate a historical development toward a relic cult of bodhisattas.

In modern times, the story of Sumedha's sacrifice has been raised by Theravāda Buddhists as an example of selflessness in Buddhism. Sri Lankan monk and scholar Walpola Rahula wrote:

The bhikkhu [Buddhist monk] is not a selfish, cowardly individual thinking only of his happiness and salvation, unmindful of whatever happens to the rest of humanity. A true bhikkhu is an altruistic, heroic person who considers others' happiness more than his own. He, like the Bodhisattva Sumedha, will renounce his own nirvāṇa for the sake of others. Buddhism is built upon service to others.[emphasis added]

On a similar note, Burmese politician Aung San Suu Kyi raised Sumedha's example as a model for selfless public service.

== Comparison with Jainism ==
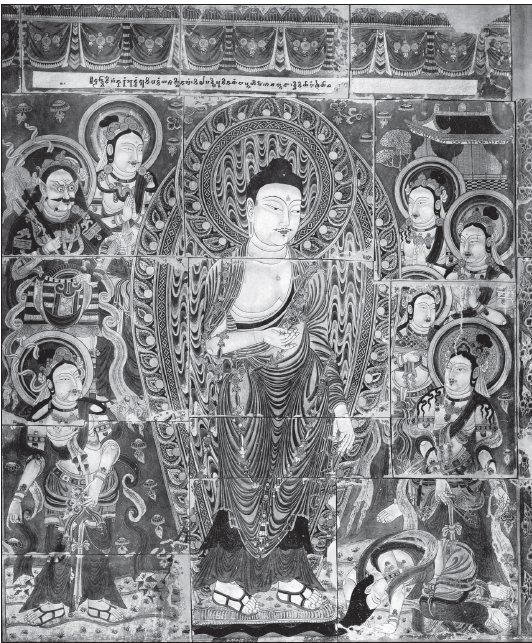
Dīpankara and Sumedha, Furfan, China, ninth–eleventh century

In Jainism, a similar story exists with regard to their founder Mahāvira, who is predicted to become a jina, an omniscient being, in a future life. He creates much bad karma, however, and is reborn in hell as a result. Later he manages to be reborn as a human being and fulfill the prophecy. Both the Buddha-to-be and Mahāvira-to-be encounter 24 preceding omniscient teachers. (Note: Scholars are in debate as to whether the shared idea of 24 predecessors originates in Buddhism or in Jainism. However, in the Buddhavaṃsa another three Buddhas are mentioned, making for a total of 27, but these are not expanded on in the main body of the text.) Therefore, there are similarities between this story on the one hand, and the life of Sumedha and his friend Meghadatta on the other hand.

There are some differences, however. Sumedha makes an aspiration for full enlightenment before he receives his prophecy, whereas Marīci, the previous life of Mahāvira, is not depicted as upholding such an aspiration, and the prophecy is made at the request of Marīci's father, whereas in Sumedha's case, the prophecy is made in response to his aspiration. Secondly, in Marīci's case, the prophecy also pertains to some "worldly and morally dubious" attainments such as becoming a powerful king (Pali: cakkavatti, Sanskrit: cakravartin), whereas the prophecy Sumedha receives does not contain such elements. Sumedha's aspiration is seen as a powerful and positive intention, that can only lead to positive consequences, as predicted in the prophecy. In Marīci's case, however, his prophecy is not connected with his conscious intention, and the consequences of the prophecy are both positive and negative. This ties in with doctrinal differences in karma and intention between the two religions: whereas in Buddhism intention is fundamental to the concept of karmic retribution, in Jainism all action is important, even that without intention. Whereas in Buddhism a positive and powerful aspiration is seen to only lead to positive results, in Jainism, nearly all aspiration has a problematic side to it, as Marīci's prophecy leads him to an accomplishment as a jina, but also potentially dangerous worldly powers.

== In popular culture ==
Sumedha (Arun Govind) lying down. From Buddha by G. Adi Sheshagiri Rao

The life of Sumedha was depicted in the initial episodes of the 1997 Indian serial Buddha, produced by G. Adi Sheshagiri Rao. In this serial of 27 episodes, the Buddha (and the Buddha-to-be) is played by actor Arun Govind. The story mostly follows the traditional outline, but much time is spent on the generosity of Sumedha, at one point showing him sacrificing his eyes for a blind person.
