= Upper Atbara and Setit Dam Complex =

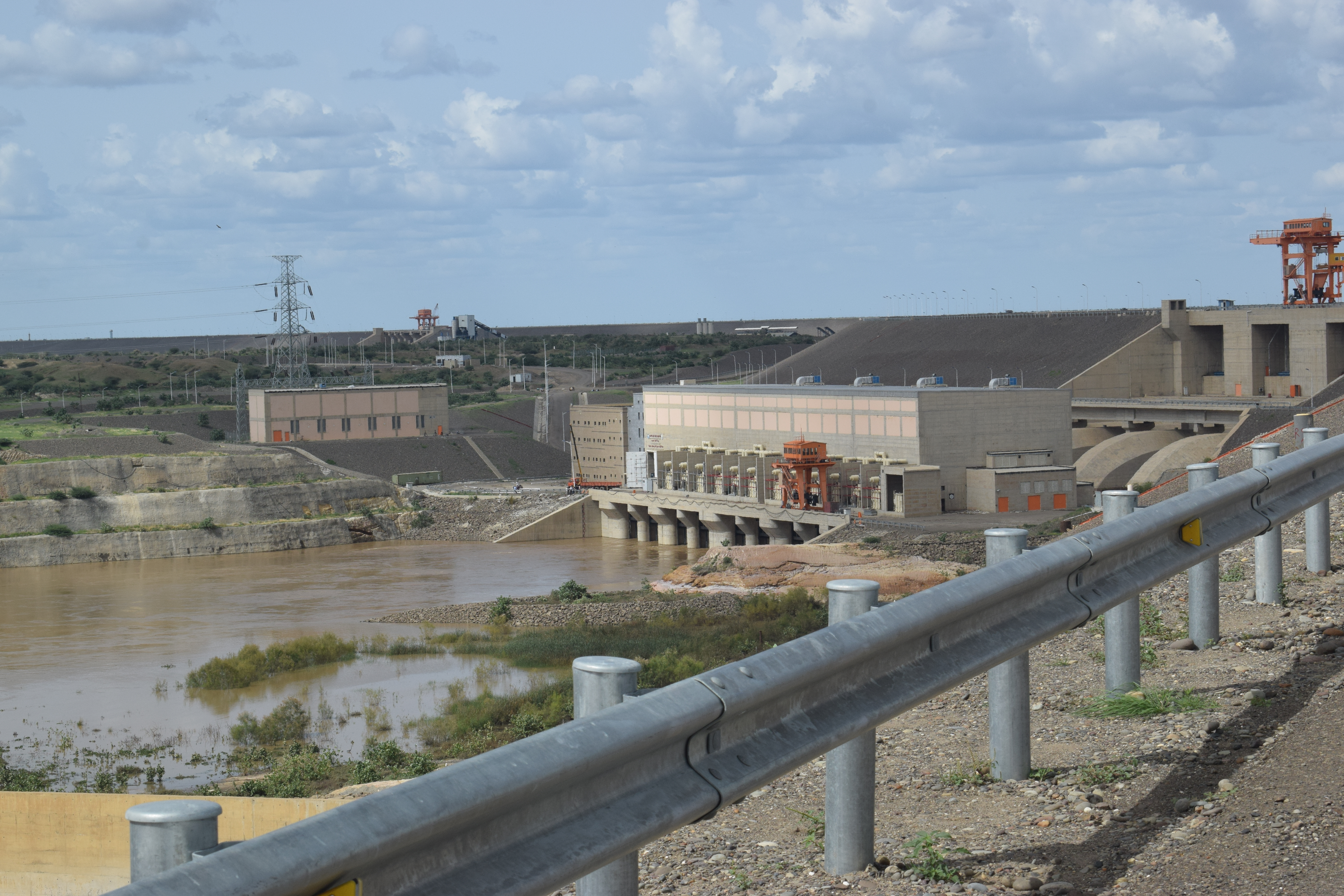

- Location within Sudan
- Location: Sudan
- Coordinates: 14°16′36″N 35°53′49″E
- Construction began: 2011
- Opening date: 2017
- Construction cost: US$ 1.9 billion

Dam and spillways
- Impounds: Atbarah River/Setit River
- Height: Rumela: 55 m (180 ft); Burdana: 50 m (164 ft)
- Length: 13 km (8.1 mi)
- Spillway capacity: Rumela: 4,900 m^{3}/s (170,000 cu ft/s); Burdana: 9,400 m^{3}/s (331,958 cu ft/s)

Reservoir
- Total capacity: 2,700×10^{6} m^{3} (2,200,000 acre⋅ft)
- Normal elevation: 517.5 m (1,698 ft)

Power Station
- Turbines: Rumela: 3 x 40 MW (54,000 hp) Francis-type; Burdana: 3 x 5 MW bulb
- Installed capacity: 135 MW (181,000 hp)
- Annual generation: 380 GWh (1,400 TJ) annually (est.)

The Upper Atbara and Setit Dam Complex is a twin dam complex comprising Rumela Dam on the Upper Atbarah River and Burdana Dam on the Setit (Tekezé) River in eastern Sudan. The site of the twin dam is located about 20 kilometres (12 mi) upstream from the junction of the Atbarah and Setit rivers and about 80 kilometres (50 mi) south of the Khashm el-Girba Dam. Construction began in 2011 was expected to be completed by March 2016. The 320 MW dam was inaugurated by President Omar al-Bashir in February 2017, with final stages completed later that year.

== Design ==
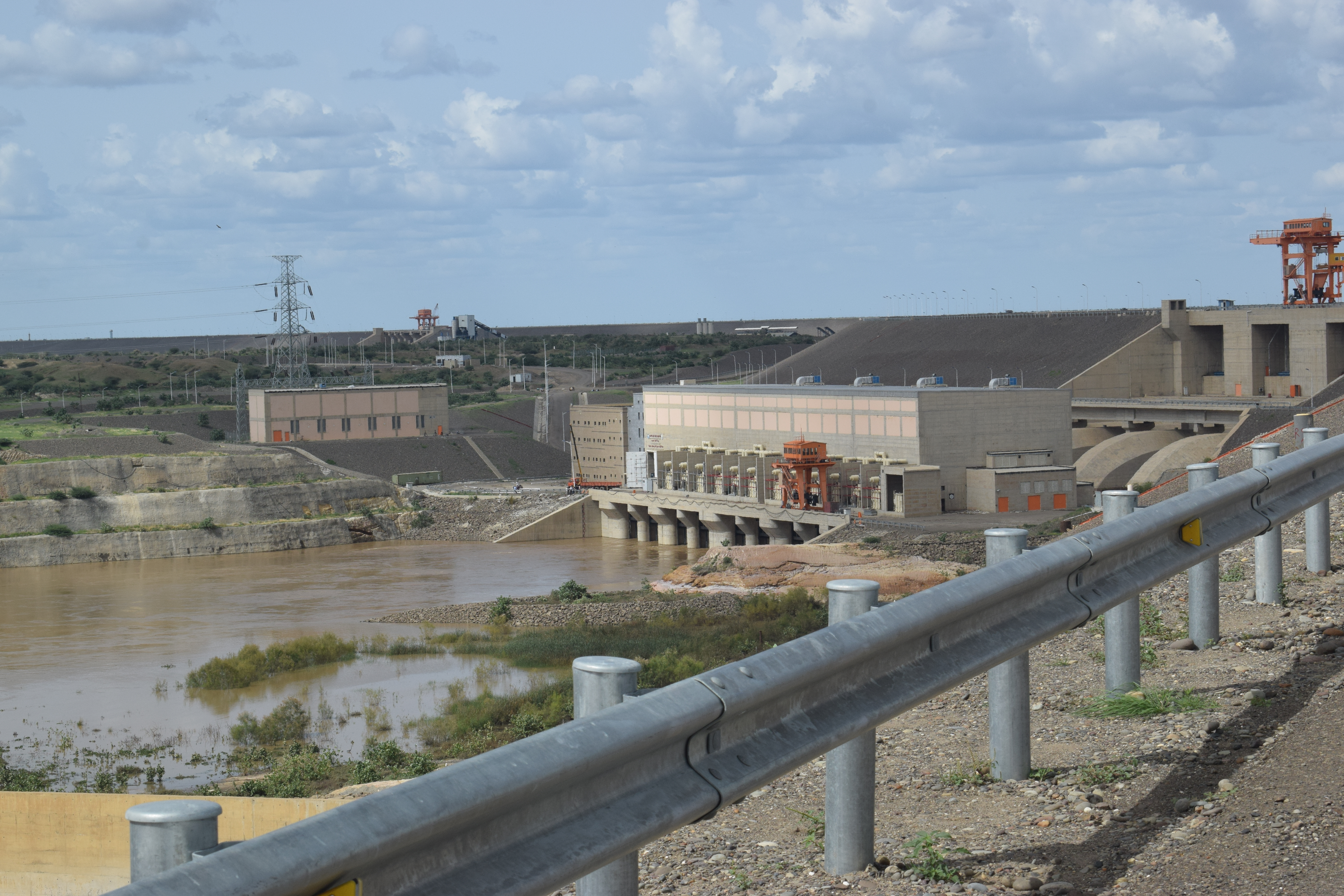
Upper Atbara and Setit Dam Complex Power Plant

Rumela Dam on the Atbarah is 55 metres (180 ft) tall and Burdana Dam on the Setit is 50 metres (160 ft) in height. The two dams are connected and have a total length of 13 kilometres (8.1 mi). The twin dam complex has a joined reservoir with a storage capacity of about 3.7 billion cubic metres (3,000,000 acre⋅ft) of water. The maximum filling level is 517.5 metres (1,698 ft) above sea level. The project includes the construction of hydropower stations on both Rumela and Burdana dams with a total installed capacity of 320 MW, and annual firm energy of 834 gigawatt-hours (3,000 TJ).

== Project objectives ==
The project was announced in April 2010 with the aims of supporting the development of eastern Sudan by providing irrigation for local agriculture, supplying potable water, and power generation. The project also aimed to increase agriculture production in the New Halfa area of Kassala currently irrigated by the Khashm el-Girba Dam, and the development of new land consisting of 504,200 hectares (1,246,000 acres) in Upper Atbara. Additionally, the dams are expected to provide flood-protection measures along the river banks by regulating the river flow in the project area.

== Project costs ==
The total cost of the dam complex is estimated at $1.9 billion, of which $838 million for the construction of the dams is from the China Three Gorges Corporation (CTG) and its overseas project-contracting subsidiary, China International Water & Electric Corporation (CWE).

In addition to the project implementation costs are hydroelectric and electric costs, technical and consultancy service costs, land-owning and population resettlement costs, and project implementation management and supervision costs by Sudan's Dams Implementation Unit (DIU). The consultant for the project is the French company Sogreah, which also designed and supervised the implementation of the Khashm el-Girba Dam during the 1960s. The Rumela and Burdana dam designs were revised by the German Company Lahmeyer International, the same company that allegedly revised and supervised the design of the controversial Merowe Dam.

== Archaeology ==
Archaeological surveys were undertaken in the area to be flooded by the National Corporation for Antiquities and Museums during the summer of 2011.
