= Khashm el-Girba Dam =

Dam in Khashm El Girba, Sudan

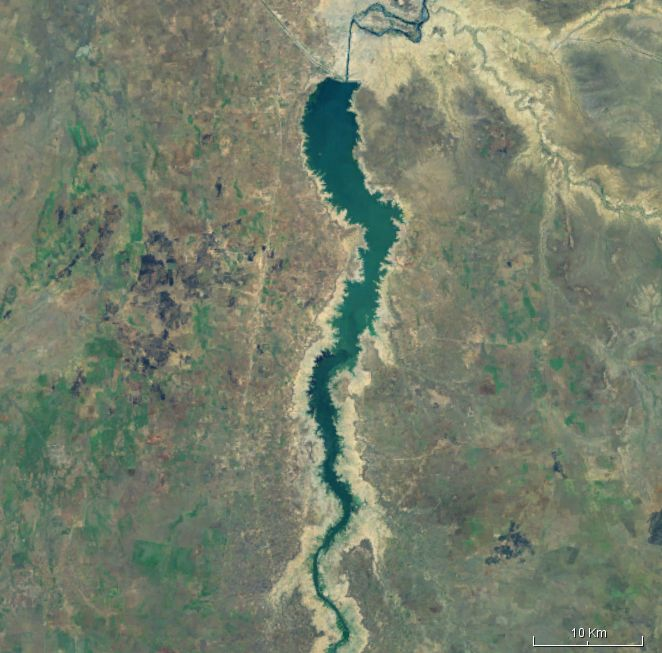
- NASA overhead of the dam and reservoir

- Location within Sudan
- Country: Sudan
- Location: Khashm El Girba
- Coordinates: 14°55′31.29″N 35°54′28.30″E
- Purpose: Water supply, power
- Status: Operational
- Construction began: 1960
- Opening date: 1964

Dam and spillways
- Type of dam: Gravity/embankment
- Impounds: Atbarah River
- Height: 47 m (154 ft)
- Length: 3,500 m (11,500 ft)
- Spillway capacity: Spillway: 1,000 m^{3}/s (35,000 cu ft/s); Lower floodgates: 7,700 m^{3}/s (270,000 cu ft/s)

Reservoir
- Creates: Khashm el-Girba Reservoir
- Total capacity: 1,300,000,000 m^{3} (1,100,000 acre⋅ft)
- Catchment area: 112,400 km^{2} (43,400 sq mi)
- Surface area: 125 km^{2} (48 sq mi)
- Maximum length: 80 km (50 mi)
- Normal elevation: 473 m (1,552 ft)

Power Station
- Commission date: 1961, 1963
- Turbines: 2 x 5 MW (6,700 hp) Kaplan-type
- Installed capacity: 10 MW (13,000 hp)

The Khashm el-Girba Dam is a gravity and embankment composite dam on the Atbarah River about 4 km (2 mi) south of Khashm El Girba in eastern Sudan. The primary purpose of the dam is irrigation.

The dam is equipped with canal headworks, located on its left bank, which divert water into a canal. When water levels in the reservoir are low, three pumps move water into the canal.

The main portion of the dam is an earthen embankment; the spillway and irrigation headworks sections are concrete gravity. The dam has a small hydroelectric power station, which was upgraded during the period 2002–04 to its current installed capacity of 10 megawatts (13,000 hp).

== See also ==
- Upper Atbara and Setit Dam Complex
