= Chinese people in Réunion =

Overseas ethnic Chinese community

Chinois Réunionnais
Sinwà Rényoné

Total population
- 50,000 or more (2021 census)

Languages
- French, Réunion Creole; Chinese (predominantly Hakka and Cantonese) spoken only by members of older generations

Religion
- Roman Catholicism · Mahayana Buddhism

Related ethnic groups
- Han Chinese, Hakka Chinese, Cantonese, Sino-Mauritians, Sino-Seychellois, Chinese South Africans & Chinese people in Madagascar

Chinois Réunionnais, also referred to in Réunion Creole as Sinwà Rényoné, are ethnic Chinese people residing in Réunion Island, a French overseas department situated in the Indian Ocean. As of 2000, roughly 25,000 or more lived on the island, making them one of the region's largest Chinese communities along with Sino-Mauritians, Sino-Seychellois, Chinese South Africans and Chinese people in Madagascar. As per 2021 census, it is estimated that 50,000 or more Overseas Chinese people now live in Réunion.

== Migration history ==
Despite their French citizenship, the Chinois form a group with origins distinct from the Chinese in metropolitan France. The first Chinese to arrive in Réunion came not directly from China, but rather were indentured labourers drawn from among the population of Chinese in Malaya, who arrived on the island in 1844 to work in grain production and levee-building. They violently resisted the slave-like manner in which they were treated, and as a result, the colonial government put a stop to the immigration of Chinese indentured labourers just two years later.

Beginning in the 1850s, Cantonese-speakers began to arrive from Mauritius. It was common for a Sino-Mauritian to bring his relatives over from China to Mauritius for a period of apprenticeship in his business; after they had gained sufficient familiarity with commercial practises and life in a colonial society, he would send them onwards with letters of introduction, lending them his own capital to start up businesses in neighbouring regions, including Réunion. Hakka-speakers from Mauritius came as well in this manner starting only in the late 1880s.

However, re-migration from Mauritius was not the only source of free Chinese migration to Réunion. In 1862, Réunion's government liberalised their immigration laws, allowing any foreigner to take up employment. Each year, a few hundred Cantonese-speaking migrants from Guangdong took advantage of this law and arrived in Réunion. Hakkas from Meixian and French Indochina began to arrive around the same time as those from Mauritius, in the late 1880s. As in other overseas Chinese communities, conflict between Cantonese- and Hakka-speakers was a common feature of social life, and the two groups tried to avoid contact with each other. The Hakka migrants settled in the south of the island, especially at Saint-Pierre and Le Tampon. Re-migration from Mauritius to Réunion continued in this manner until around 1940. Migrants were almost all male; until the late 1930s or early 1940s, fewer than one thousand had arrived on the island.

After World War II, metropolitan French immigration laws were extended to cover Réunion. Along with the closure of China's borders in 1950, this meant that Chinese migration to the island largely came to a halt. By that time, the Chinese population of the island was roughly four thousand. Today's Chinois consist largely of their descendants. However, roughly 2,000 more new expatriates have come from the People's Republic of China in recent years.

== Language and education ==
The first Chinese school in Réunion was set up at Saint-Denis in 1927, but closed three years later when the teacher returned to China. In the following decade, more schools were set up privately, financed by contributions from Chinese businessmen. Prior to the 1950s, locally-born ethnic Chinese children typically attended these Chinese schools, and as a result, they spoke both Chinese and Creole fluently, but not French. However, authorities looked dimly on such schools, seeing them as promoting cultural separatism, and so imposed a variety of regulations on their operation, requiring that they spend more time on French-language teaching than Chinese-language teaching. As a result, new bilingual schools were established, the two most famous of which were the ones at Saint-Denis and Saint-André.

After World War II, education in French schools became mandatory. As a result, the generation who entered school after then typically spoke little Chinese; however, many of them went to metropolitan France for their higher education, and as a result, speak both French and Creole fluently. In an effort to "return to their roots", members of this generation and the younger ones have been attempting to reconnect to Chinese culture through cultural and language courses, return trips to their ancestors' villages in China, and the like. However, they are largely assimilated into French and Creole culture, and feel little connection to today's China, which has undergone huge changes since their ancestors emigrated.

== Employment ==
The immigrant generation, as well their children who were educated locally in Chinese schools, often found self-employment as shopkeepers; in the 1970s, with rising standards of living on the island, they were able to expand their small shops into spacious markets. Their children, who were educated in France, have entered the liberal professions, such as medicine, dentistry, law, and architecture, or found employment in accountancy and engineering firms or the public sector.

== Cuisine ==
Chinese cuisine is now consumed by people all over Réunion. One of the most visible culinary legacies of South China are bouchons, known as shumai in North American dim sum restaurants. Pork bouchons are commonly eaten in baguettes and paninis with melted cheese and hotsauce. Riz cantonais, a basic fried rice with diced vegetables and roasted pork, is another common dish. Chinese migrants also introduced a number of different plants and animals to the island, including a Chinese variety of the guava known locally and in Mauritius and the Seychelles as goyave de Chine. Réunion is famous for its lychees, also from China.
