= Mauritians of Chinese origin =

Ethnic group of Chinese origins in Mauritius

Sino-Mauritians
Regions with significant populations
- 3% of the population (Half in Port Louis, with small numbers all over the island)

Languages
- Mauritian Creole, French, English, Chinese (predominantly Hakka and Cantonese)

Religion
- Christianity, Chinese folk religion (including Confucianism and Taoism), Buddhism, others

Related ethnic groups
- Han Chinese, Chinese people in Madagascar, Sino-Réunionnais, Sino-Seychellois, Chinese South Africans

Mauritians of Chinese origin, also known as Sino-Mauritians or Chinese Mauritians, are Mauritians who trace their ethnic ancestry to the Greater China region.

== Migration history ==
=== Chinese migration from Sumatra to Mauritius ===
Like members of other communities on the island, some of the earliest Chinese in Mauritius arrived involuntarily, having been "shanghaied" from Sumatra in the 1740s to work in Mauritius in a scheme hatched by the French admiral Charles Hector, Comte d'Estaing; however, they soon went on strike to protest their kidnapping. The authorities responded by deporting them back to Sumatra.

=== Chinese migration from China to Mauritius ===
==== Late 1700s and early 1800s ====
In the 1780s, thousands of voluntary Chinese migrants (estimated to be more than 3,000) set sail for Port Louis from Guangzhou on board British, French, and Danish ships; they found employment as blacksmiths, carpenters, cobblers, and tailors, and quickly formed a small Chinatown, the camp des Chinois, in Port Louis. Even after the British takeover of the island, migration continued unabated.

The first wave of migration from China to Mauritius occurred in the early 1800s, the Chinese migrants who came to Mauritius were mainly Hokkien from Xiamen (Amoy) in Southern Fujian province. Most of these migrants from Fujian were merchants and therefore according to the law they were not allowed to bring their families with them, were not allowed to buy lands unless they abandoned their Chinese citizenship and adopted British citizenship; therefore, this led to many intermarriages with women of the Creole and Indian communities in order to build their own families or buy land under the name of their spouses.

In 1829, the British brought a group of Chinese migrants to work on sugar plantations; harsh working conditions led the Chinese migrants to start a failed revolt. Between 1840 and 1843 alone, 3,000 Chinese contract workers arrived on the island. By 1846, it is estimated that an influx of 50 Chinese migrants came to Mauritius per year. By mid-century, the total resident Chinese population reached five thousand.

==== Circa mid-1800s ====
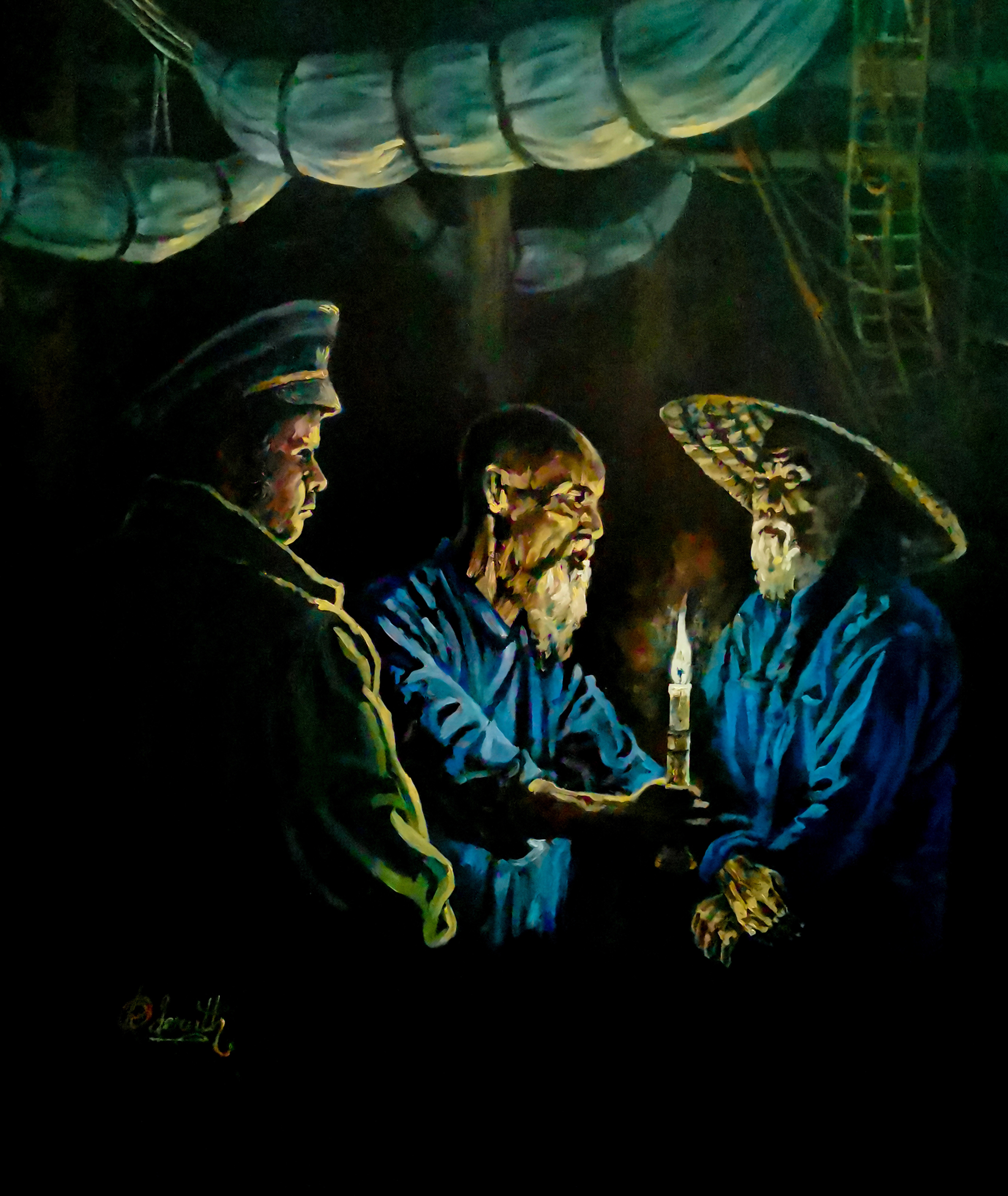
Early Chinese immigrants by Artist Raouf Oderuth

A second wave of migration from China mainly came from the city of Guangzhou (Canton). In the mid-1800s, they mainly came from the district of Shunde. Some of them were coolies who passed through Hong Kong and came to Mauritius to work through the British colonial network, while others were merchants and craftsmen. These migrants were known as the Cantonese and Namshun (南顺) in Mauritius.

By the 1860s, shops run by Sino-Mauritians could be found all over the island. Some members of the colonial government thought that further migration should be prohibited, but Governor John Pope Hennessy, recognizing the role that Sino-Mauritians played in providing cheap goods to less well-off members of society, resisted the restrictionists' lobbying.

==== Late 1800s and mid-1900s ====
During the 1880s, despite the continuous influx of immigrants, Mauritius' Chinese population declined; Chinese traders, legally unable to purchase land in Mauritius, instead brought their relatives from China over to Mauritius. After training them for a few years to give them a handle on the business and to introduce them to life in a Western-ruled colonial society, the traders sent those relatives on their way, with capital and letters of introduction, to establish businesses in neighbouring countries. For example, between 1888 and 1898, nearly 1,800 Chinese departed from Port Louis with ports on the African mainland—largely Port Elizabeth and Durban—as their destinations.

In the late 19th to early 20th century, Chinese men in Mauritius married Indian women due to both a lack of Chinese women and the higher numbers of Indian women on the island. From the late 1800s to the mid-1900s, a third wave of Chinese migrants came to Mauritius. This time, most of them were Hakka Chinese from the region of Meixian (梅县; commonly known as Moyen in Hakka). There were numerous reasons for their arrival in Mauritius, including their desire to escape starvation or seek fortune. During that period of time, Chinese women were allowed to come in Mauritius and contributed to an increase growth of the Chinese community; moreover, the Hakka were reluctant to marry with other ethnic communities and started organizing marriage with Chinese women back home to maintain their community's blood purity, some women even became known as "marriage breakers" as they attempted to break mixed marriage of Chinese men to make them remarry a Chinese spouse. The earliest migrants were largely Cantonese-speaking; but, later, Hakka-speakers from Meixian, further east in Canton (modern-day Guangdong), came to dominate numerically; as in other overseas Chinese communities, rivalry between Hakka and Cantonese became a common feature of the society. The Hakka-Cantonese tensions led to the resettlement of many Cantonese in Reunion Island and Madagascar. By the end of the 19th century, the Hakkas became the dominant group outnumbering the Cantonese and Fukienese together.

By 1901, the Sino-Mauritian population had shrunk to 3,515 individuals, among them 2,585 being business owners. The 1921 census in Mauritius counted that Indian women there had a total of 148 children fathered by Chinese men. These Chinese were mostly traders.

Until the 1930s, Chinese migrants continued to arrive in Port Louis, but with the strain on the local economy's ability to absorb them, many found that Mauritius would only be their first stop; they went on to the African mainland (especially South Africa), as well as to Madagascar, Réunion, and Seychelles. After World War II, immigration from China largely came to an end.

==== Mid-1900s to late 1900s ====
Between the 1950s and 1980s, there was a considerable reduction of contacts with China due to the establishment of the People's Republic of China; nearly all Chinese migration from China was stopped. During this period, Hakka women from Taiwan arrived in Mauritius to marry the local Hakka Chinese men in Mauritius. Until 1997, investors and merchants from Hong Kong were encouraged to come to Mauritius to start their own trading business but only few people from Hong Kong permanently migrated to Mauritius.

Sino-Mauritians continued to maintain the personal ethnic networks connecting them to relatives in greater China, which would play an important role in the 1980s, with the rise of the export-processing zones. Foreign investors from Hong Kong and Taiwan, and the factories they built in the EPZs, helped Mauritius to become the third-largest exporter of woollen knitwear in the world. Along with the investors came a new influx of Chinese migrant workers, who signed on for three-year stints in the garment factories.

After the 1980s, China reopened up to the world and migration from China to Mauritius slowly restarted and therefore, the old marriage network of the Hakka was re-established, allowing Hakka women from Meixian to marry the local Hakka Sino-Mauritians. Simultaneously, Chinese women migrant workers who came to work in textile factories came from all regions of China and some of them decided to remain in Mauritius instead of returning to China after the completion of their work contract; these Chinese women married Sino-Mauritian men and settled with their families in Mauritius. However, the local Sino-Mauritian community in Mauritius declined in numbers as some decided to immigrate to Canada, the US, and Australia.

== Demographics, distribution, and employment ==
=== Ethnic subgroups and cultural identity ===
==== Cantonese / Namshun ====
Sino-Mauritians who trace their Cantonese ancestors from the province of Guandong are known as the "Namshun" (南顺) or "Cantonese" in Mauritius. Sino-Mauritian of Cantonese origins in Mauritius have their own separate associations, societies, and events; for example, the Nam Shun Society (Namshun Fooy Koon; 南顺会馆) in Port Louis. The Nam Shun society is an association for the Sino-Mauritians whose ancestors mainly originated from Nam Hoi (Nanhai district) and Shun Tak (Shunde).

==== Fokien / Fukien / Hokkien ====
Sino-Mauritians who trace their ancestors from province Fujian in China, are known as 'Fokien', 'Fukien' or 'Hokkien' people in Mauritius; this is in reference of the ancestral province location. Due to their intermarriage with other ethnic groups (mostly creole and Indian), people who are born with mixed ancestral are perceived as "Sino-creoles"; Sino-creoles, however, are often proud of their ancestors and perceived themselves as Chinese.

==== Hakka ====
Nowadays, most Sino-Mauritians living in Mauritius are Hakka (客家) who can trace their ancestry back to Meixian, Guangdong province.

==== Sino-creoles ====
The Sino-creoles are typically categorized as "General population" in the Mauritian demographic census despite being a subgroup of the Sino-Mauritian community. (Note: The Mauritian constitution recognizes only four communities, classified according to both origins and religions, which includes "Sino-Mauritian" (who originate from China) and the "General population". The "General population" category include 1. Descendants of European settlers and Creole people, and 2. Any person born from inter-ethnic marriage) The Sino-creoles community in Mauritius can include:

1. Children born of a mixed marriage between a Sino-Mauritian and a non-Chinese person.
2. Descendants of Chinese migrants who married with a member of a non-Chinese community in Mauritius, e.g. descendants of the Fukien male migrants who married women of a non-Chinese ethnic community.
3. Children born of a Mauritian of non-Chinese origin who married a Chinese spouse from China

=== Employment ===
Historically, most Sino-Mauritians became businesspeople, with a once "virtual monopoly" on retail trade. In per capita terms, after the Franco-Mauritian population, they form the second-wealthiest group on the island. They own restaurants, retail and wholesale shops, and import-and-export firms. Chinese restaurants have greatly influenced Mauritian culture, and Chinese food is consumed all over the island by people of all backgrounds. Fried noodles is one of the most popular dishes. Mauritians from all ethnic origin and background also enjoy the various vegetables and meat balls (Niouk Yen, Sow Mai, Van Yen, Fee Yen) which originate from the Hakka cuisine in Meixian.

In a 2001 Business Magazine survey, 10 of the 50 largest companies were Chinese owned.

== Language ==
Most Sino-Mauritian youth are at least trilingual: they use Mauritian Creole and French orally, while English—the language of administration and education—remains primarily a written language. In the 1990 census, roughly one-third of Sino-Mauritians stated Mauritian Creole as both their ancestral and currently spoken language. The other two-thirds indicated some form of Chinese as their ancestral language although only fewer than one-quarter of census respondents who identified Chinese as their ancestral language also indicated it as the language spoken in the home. Few Sino-Mauritian youth speak Chinese; those who do use it primarily for communication with elderly relatives, especially those who did not attend school and thus had little exposure to English or French. None use it to communicate with their siblings or cousins. Among those members of the community who do continue to speak Hakka, wide divergence with Meixian Hakka has developed in terms of vocabulary and phonology. Other of varieties of Chinese spoken in Mauritius aside Hakka are: Hokkien, Cantonese, and Standard Mandarin.

Chinese dialects spoken in Mauritius (Note: Most ancestors of Sino-Mauritans were originally from Southern China, and therefore Standard Mandarin was not an ancestral language of any Sino-Mauritians. Standard Mandarin is taught in schools)
Chinese ethnic group in Mauritius	Chinese language and dialects spoken in Mauritius	
Fujianese (Fukien / Fokien / Hokkien)	Southern Min	Hokkien: Amoy dialect
Cantonese (Namshun)	Yue	Cantonese
Hakka	Hakka	Meixian dialect
Not restricted or defined by any Chinese ethnic groups	Standard Mandarin	

== Chinese schools ==
Two Chinese-medium middle schools were established in the first half of the 20th century. The Chinese Middle School (华文学校, later called 新华中学 and then 新华学校) was established on 10 November 1912 as a primary school; in 1941, they expanded to include a lower middle school. Their student population exceeded 1,000. The Chung-Hwa Middle School (中华中学), established by Kuomintang cadres on 20 October 1941, grew to enroll 500 students, but by the end of the 1950s, that had shrunk to just 300; they stopped classes entirely in the 1960s, although their alumni association remains prominent in the Sino-Mauritian community. The Chinese Middle School also faced the problem of falling student numbers, as more Sino-Mauritians sent their children to mainstream schools, and in the 1970s stopped their weekday classes, retaining only a weekend section. However, their student numbers began to experience some revival in the mid-1980s; in the 1990s, they established a weekday pre-school section. Most of their teachers are local Sino-Mauritians, though some are expatriates from mainland China.

== Media ==
Four Chinese-language newspapers continued to be published in Mauritius as of 2014. A monthly news magazine also began publication in 2005. The newspapers are printed in Port Louis, but not widely distributed outside the city.

=== Chinese Commercial Gazette ===
The Chinese Commercial Gazette (华侨商报) was once the largest and most influential Chinese-language newspaper in Mauritius. It stopped publishing in the 1960s, and merged with the China Times.

=== Chinese Daily News ===
The Chinese Daily News (中华日报) is a pro-Kuomintang newspaper. It was founded in 1932. The rivalry between Beijing-friendly and Taipei-friendly newspapers reached its peak in the 1950s; then-editor-in-chief of the Chinese Daily News, Too Wai Man (杜蔚文), even received death threats.

=== China Times ===
The China Times (formerly 中国时报; now 华侨时报) was founded in 1953. The editor-in-chief, Long Siong Ah Keng (吴隆祥), was born in 1921 in Mauritius; at age 11, he followed his parents back to their ancestral village in Meixian, Guangdong, where he graduated from high school and went on to Guangxi University. After graduation, he signed on with the Chinese Commercial Gazette and returned to Mauritius. He left Mauritius again in 1952 to work for a Chinese paper in India, but a position at the China Times enticed him back.

Originally a four-page paper, the China Times later expanded to eight full-colour pages.

=== The Mirror ===
The Mirror (镜报) was established in 1976. It is published on a weekly basis every Saturday. At its peak, they had a staff of eight people. Their editor-in-chief, Mr. Ng Kee Siong (黄基松), began his career at the Chinese Commercial Paper in 1942 at the age of 25. After 18 years there, the paper was forced to shut down. He and a team of fellow journalists founded a paper to replace it, the New Chinese Commercial Paper. It was while working there that he met Chu Vee Tow and William Lau, who would help him to establish The Mirror. Another editor and journalist, Mr. Poon Yune Lioung POON YOW TSE (冯云龙), who studied foreign languages at Tsinghua University, was also solicited to lend a hand. The paper is printed by Dawn Printing, which is currently run by Ng Kee Siong's son David.

Most of The Mirror's readers are in their forties or older; it has subscribers not just in Mauritius, but Réunion, Madagascar, Canada, China, Australia and Hong Kong as well. The paper's local readership has been boosted slightly by guest workers from China, but the circulation barely exceeded 1,000 copies in 2001. By 2006, that number had fallen to seven hundred. In 2010, The Mirror stopped publication.

=== SinoNews ===
Hua Sheng Bao (华声报), also referred to as Sinonews, was founded in 2005. With regards to its editorial line, it is a supporter of Chinese unification. It began as a daily newspaper solely in Chinese, but then changed to an eight-page format, including one page each of English and French news. It mostly prints Xinhua newswire reports, with the last page devoted to local news.

== Culture of Mauritians of Chinese origins ==
Nowadays, the Sino-Mauritians is a minority community in Mauritius which is facing numerous challenges, including deculturalization and the loss of ancestral values; with the young Sino-Mauritians losing their Chinese identity.

=== Chinese arts and literature ===
==== Chinese literature / legends / stories ====
Some Chinese legends and stories continue to persist and to be transmitted in the Sino-Mauritian community due to their associations with the major festivals in which they partake in.

Chinese legends and stories which continue to persist within the Sino-Mauritian community, include:

- The legend of Houyi and Chang'e, associated with the Moon Festival (Mid-Autumn Festival)
- The legend of Nian, associated with Chinese New Year's firecracker tradition
- The Story of Dragon Boat Festival related to the consumption of zong and the commemoration of Qu Yuan, associated with the Dragon Boat Festival

==== Dance and music ====
Sino-Mauritians continue to perform some traditional Chinese dances, like the dragon dance. The lion dance and dragon dance holds an important place in the Sino-Mauritian culture.

==== Martial arts ====
Chinese martial arts are practiced within the Sino-Mauritian community and are no more exclusive to their community in Mauritius. Some of these martial arts are:

- Kung fu
- Tai chi
- Wing Chun

=== Chinese clans, Chinese associations and society, and name structure ===
During the colonial period, the Chinese migrants who came to Mauritius were known to be "clanish" in nature. The 3 main Chinese subgroups (Fukien, Namshun, and Hakka) in Mauritius each had their own recognized leaders. Recognized leaders during that period were: Hahime Choisanne (Fukien), Affan Tank Wen (Cantonese).

Most Chinese immigrants who came to Mauritius during the colonial period easily rebuilt their clan network in Mauritius; these clan networks came to function as mutual aid societies and social centres for the Chinese immigrants and their descendants. Chinese Societies and clan associations continue to exist in present-day Mauritius.

List of clans in Mauritius
Name of Clan	Chinese characters	Pinyin
Lee		
Ng		

==== Names of Sino-Mauritians ====
Sino-Mauritians may have a European name (usually a French name) as their first name.

===== Surname structure of Sino-Mauritians =====
The surname of Sino-Mauritians are typically composed of 2 or 3 syllables-long instead of being one-syllable long as found in typical Chinese surname; this is the result of surname alternation during the administrative process of the past Chinese immigration system to Mauritius, often happened through the stop over in Hong Kong during the Colonial period. Most Sino-Mauritians use the full Chinese name, which includes the Chinese surname (姓; xing) and Chinese first name (名字, mingzi), of their (patrilineal), of their Chinese immigrant ancestor (i.e. the first generation Chinese immigrant who arrived to Mauritius) who had his full name turned into a last name during the immigration process. Therefore, when a baby is born in Mauritius (second generation), he is registered with the surname of his father and therefore inherit a three-syllables surname; this pattern of surname is later followed by the subsequent generations. The variation in Sino-Mauritian surname spelling is mostly due to the pronunciation of Chinese names into Latin script. Throughout the immigration process, some Chinese migrants had their first name turned into their surname while others had their Chinese nicknames (e.g. in the form of "Ah-given name") turned into their surname. Sino-Mauritians who lacks their forefather's xing in their surname rely on oral transmission from generations to generations to be aware of their ancestral surname.

=== Clothing ===
In the 19th century, Chinese men living in Mauritius working as shopkeepers wore shanku and braided their hair in a queue. When they walked on streets however, they would wear European shoes and large umbrellas; the wealthy Chinese merchants would carry leather bags. The picture of Ahime Choisanne stored in the Kwan Tee Pagoda in Les Salines shows him wearing formal official uniform of the Qing dynasty (Mandarin robe with buzi, Qing guanmao, chaozhu).

Nowadays, Sino-Mauritians mainly wear Western-style clothing in their daily lives.

=== Cuisine ===
Sino-Mauritian cuisine includes both Chinese cuisine and localization of Chinese cuisine. Sino-Mauritians also follow and/or have maintained some Chinese food traditions and customs. For example, the tradition of Chinese red eggs which are shared with family members. It is also customary for Sino-Mauritians to eat fried noodles on birthday celebrations. Despite being one of the smallest community in Mauritius, Sino-Mauritian cuisine is the most present in the restaurants throughout the island.

=== Chinese calendar and zodiac ===
Some Sino-Mauritian still refer to the Tung Shing (Chinese almanac) to find auspicious dates and time for diverse events in their lives, including:

- Their wedding date;
- The time to light firecrackers on Chinese New Year

The Chinese zodiac is still followed and holds an important place within the Sino-Mauritian community.

==== Festivals and holidays ====
Sino-Mauritian, like all Mauritians regardless of their origins, celebrates on the Gregorian calendar-based New Year's Eve and New Year (1 January). They also follow some Traditional Chinese festival and holidays:

List of Traditional Festivals / Holidays followed by Sino-Mauritians
Name of Festivals / Holidays	Approximate month on Gregorian calendar	Date of Chinese calendar	Description
Chinese New Year festival	January or February	1st day of the year	Public Holiday in Mauritius.
Lantern Festival	February or early March	15th day of the 1st month	
Tin Hao (Mazu) Festival	March or April		Celebration of the anniversary of the goddess Tin Hao
Tomb sweeping day, also known as Fete des morts chinois			
Dragon Boat Festival	Late May or June	5th day of the 5th month	
Kwan Tee Festival, also known as Fete Mine (lit. "Noodle festival)	August	24th day of the 6th month	Celebration of the anniversary of god Guan Di
Mid-autumn Festival	Mid-September to early October	15th day of the 8th month	

=== Dual religion systems and other religions ===
The majority of the Sino-Mauritians are Catholics, a result of conversions during the colonial era. During the colonial era, some of the earliest converts to Catholicism were Chinese men who married with Christian Creole women. In this form of interethnic marriage, boys born of Chinese men could be baptized but they would still follow the traditions of their fathers; however, daughters were usually raised as Catholics. Therefore, some Chinese had to convert to Catholicism in order to marry. However, until the end of the 19th century, more than 92% of the Chinese were still following their traditional Chinese religions. Other reasons leading to the increase in Christianity of conversion were the social benefits of being Catholics; local schools also introduced Roman Catholic faith to their students; there were also many similarities in rites shared between Chinese religions and Catholicism which gave them a sense of familiarity; but the major reason is related to the tolerance of the Catholic church who allowed Chinese converts to continue their ancestor worship as it was considered a cultural practice instead of a religious practice. Many Hakka converted due to social pressure and interactions with the Catholic communities; e.g. Catholic neighbours would convince them to convert. Converting to Catholicism also allowed them to send their children to Catholic schools. The rate of conversion speeded up in the early 20th century; it is estimated that 17% of the Chinese were Christians in 1911 and by 1921, 28% of the Chinese and Sino-Mauritians in the country had become Christians.From the 1940s to 1960s, there were also many Catholic missionaries who worked on converting the Chinese and Sino-Mauritians to Catholicism, leading to a significant impact on the increase in the conversion speed. From the 1950s and onwards, Chinese religions re-emerged leading to the construction of more pagodas.By 1980s, 66% of the Sino-Mauritians were Catholic and a small amount converted to Protestantism.

Nowadays, a majority of Sino-Mauritians also identify as Catholic Christians. Other Sino-Mauritians are Protestant. Despite their identifying as Catholics, there is however a long tradition of religious parallelism among the Sino-Mauritian families, and as such, elements of Chinese religions still continue to exist even among the Christian Sino-Mauritian families. Nowadays, Sino-Mauritians (even Catholic Sino-Mauritian) still follow some form of Chinese-related religions (which include Taoist and Chinese Folk religions); a minority of Sino-Mauritians follow Buddhism; they also follow Confucianism. Typically, some syncretism occurred, incorporating elements of Buddhism, Taoism, Confucianism and traditional ancestor worship. Sino-Mauritian Christians, especially members of the older generations, sometimes retain certain traditions from Buddhism. Catholics Sino-Mauritians still frequent Chinese pagodas. The Catholic Church of Mauritius also recognises the dual religion system practice by the Sino-Mauritians to preserve their distinct traditions, including ancestral worship which remains a significant aspect of their everyday life.

==== Traditional Chinese religion and Chinese pagodas ====
In the present day, Guan Di (Kwan Tee; the god of wealth, also the god of war and the righteous and the benefactor) is an important deity for Sino-Mauritians, especially for those working in the business field. In Chinese Pagodas, altars can also be found for Guan Yin, the Goddess Mazu (also known as Tin Hao; the goddess of the sea and the protector of sailors), the God Choy Sun (the God of Good Fortune). The goddess Mazu is usually prayed by Sino-Mauritians to seek for protection for their relatives who travel abroad and to wish for their safe and good return home. For the one-month-old celebration of a Sino-Mauritian baby, the parents and the grandparents of the child make offerings to the Yudi (god of Heaven) and to Guan Yin.

Pagodas also shelter ancestral cult altars and ancestral tablets. Following Chinese tradition, religious services are typically conducted one week after death at the Pagoda and the ancestral tablet of the deceased with his name written in Chinese characters will be deposited behind the altar. On Chinese New Year, descendants of the deceased can practice the ancestral rites before the Ancestral tablets as a sign of respect.

List of Chinese pagoda in Mauritius and deity worship
Name		Year built	Built by	Location	Main deity	Minor deities	Ancestor shrine or altar
Choy Shun				Joseph-Rivière road, Chinatown, Port Louis	Caishen (God of wealth)		
Fok Tiak pagoda							
Fook Soo Am (福壽庵)		1954	Sister Fee Fong	Magon street, Port Louis	Buddhist temple (Buddha)		
Heen Foh Lee Kwon Pagoda					Guan Di		
Kwan Tee Pagoda		29 January 1842	Ahime Choïsanne (Liog Choi Sine)	Les Salines, Port Louis	Guan Di (God of wealth, god of war and the righteous and the benefactor)	Dabo Xianjun (大帛仙君); Guanyin (Giver of Children); Luzu Dadi (呂祖帝大); Mazu (Protector of sailors), also called Ma Chou; Yuelao xingjun (月老星君; God of love and marriage)	Present
Law Kwan Chung Pagoda							
Namshun Fooy Koon Pagodas	Kwan Tee Pagoda	1895		Close to the Champ de Mars race course, Port Louis	Guan Di (God of wealth, god of war and the righteous and the benefactor)	Caishen (God of wealth), called Choy Sun	Present
Namshun Fooy Koon Pagodas	Tin Hao Pagoda	1896		Close to the Champ de Mars race course, Port Louis	Mazu (Goddess of the sea), also called Tin Hao / Tin Hau		
Poo Chi		1948		Volcy Pougnet street, Mauritius			
Shen Chen		1951		Pope Hennessy street	Buddhist temple		
Shen Shan		1974		Tank Wen street, Port Louis	Buddhist temple		
Tien Tan Pagoda		1951		Foot of the Pouce mountain, Port Louis	Yu huang (Jade Emperor)	Guan Di; Guanyin	

==== Burial site and practices ====
By 1819, there was already a burial site for the Chinese community in Mauritius in Port Louis. The early Chinese graves in Mauritius (e.g. those dating from the late 1830s) were made of stones; each gravestone would 3 perpendicular rows of characters engraved on them and coloured in red. Despite the majority of Sino-Mauritians identifying as Catholics, some Sino-Mauritian families still preserve traditional Chinese funeral rites and traditions.

==== Fengshui ====
Fengshui is important to the Sino-Mauritian community and their ancestors. The site location of the first pagoda in Mauritius, Kwan Tee Pagoda, was based on Fengshui.

=== Chinese medicine ===
Natural remedies (local or imported from China) are still used in the Sino-Mauritian community in Mauritius where Traditional Chinese medicine has likely been valued, preserved, and transmitted from generation to generation. Sino-Mauritians are also observed to have deep knowledge on the preparation and administration of herbal remedies.

=== Chinese numerology ===
Sino-Mauritians maintain certain beliefs related to Chinese numerology which impact their daily lives. For example, the number 4 (四 si) continues to be associated with its homonym death (死 si), and therefore is considered an unlucky number to be avoided.

=== Significant cultural landmarks ===
Significant cultural landmarks of the Sino-Mauritian include: the Chinatown of Mauritius in Port Louis and the presence of Chinese pagoda throughout the island. In 2013, there were 11 pagodas in Mauritius all found in Port Louis. Port Louis also houses the Kwan tee Pagoda at Les Salines, which is the oldest Chinese pagoda in Mauritius and in the Southern hemisphere. Port Louis also houses one of the oldest Chinatowns in Africa.

=== Wedding and pre-wedding customs ===
Nowadays, many Sino-Mauritians have Catholic weddings and their wedding celebrations are almost similar to those of the Mauritian Creoles, but they also fuses some form of traditional Confucian or Buddhist traditions involving gift exchange between families and dowry, processions between each other's houses and performing prayers and rites at their family altars.

Traditionally, the parents of the bride throw a dinner party approximately one week before the wedding for her close relatives and friends.

On the day of the wedding, they offer offerings to their ancestors and the grooms eat 2 hard boiled eggs (symbol of fertility). Their bridal bed needs to be made by 2 women who are considered having a successful and fortunate marriage and who have a son and a daughter; this is followed by a young boy who performs a somersault.

The bride typically wears a white dress and her father helps place a headdress and a veil on her; the groom's mother gives a new set of gold jewelry to his new daughter-in-law as dowry when the groom's party goes to pick up the bride. The mother of the bride gives her a bouquet and they go to the church in separate cars; the church procession and services are the same as Catholic Mauritian creole wedding, but not all the Chinese guests attend as many older generations were not Christian and the latter would directly go to the reception hall and wait for the couple to arrive. They also perform the tea ceremony. Some couple consult the Tung Shing (Chinese almanac) to find auspicious dates and time for their tea ceremony to take place while others decide to have the tea ceremony between the church ceremony and the reception hall ceremony which made the couple and bridal party to make a detour to their house to perform the tea ceremony before going to the reception hall.

When the couple arrive to the reception hall, string of red firecrackers are set. The couple and their bridesmaid walk round the hall and food is served. Speeches and toasts are not very common. There is also a cake cutting moment and following this event, the guests start to disperse. Most Chinese wedding will also end with dances, and the sega is becoming increasingly popular.

== Significant contributions to Mauritius ==
Despite being a minority group in Mauritius, the Sino-Mauritians and their ancestors have contributed to the social and economic development of the Mauritian community and have influenced the multicultural society of Mauritius. They are a small community which has distinguished themselves from the other communities in Mauritius by being pioneers and being an indispensable part of the economic entity.

List of Contributions	Description
Microcredit system	Chinese and Sino-Mauritians working in retail trail provided basic necessities and staple food to the Mauritian community, they created a micro-credit system with the carnet laboutik (lit. "shop notebook") to sell food on credit for their customers who would their arrears during the sugarcane harvest season.
Chinese food culture	Chinese cuisine is an integral part of Mauritian cuisine. Mauritians, regardless of their origins, appreciate Chinese cuisine and consume Chinese food; the most common Chinese dishes consumed by Mauritians are: Noodles (fried or boiled), dumplings, chopsuey, Pekin duck.
Chinese dance	Dragon and Lion dance have become a common feature in Mauritian culture.
Chinese martial arts	Chinese martial arts (Wushu, Kungfu, and Taichi) in Mauritius is no more exclusive to the Sino-Mauritians and are now practiced by many Non-Chinese.
Chinese zodiac	Mauritians are curious to know their Chinese zodiac sign.
Fengshui	Fengshui is being adopted by Mauritians of diverse origins.
Fire crackers	Firecrackers which is traditionally used in Chinese culture are used during major festivals of Mauritians, including those of non-Chinese origins, e.g. Gregorian New Year, Divali and Christmas. Firecrackers are also set-off on the eve of the Gregorian-calendar based New Year's Eve.

== Notable Mauritians of Chinese origin ==
Entertainment

- Patrick Kwok-Choon: film, television, and stage actor.
- Brendan Pang: Australian cook and restaurant-owner who competed in MasterChef Australia.

Politics

- Michael Sik Yuen, Mauritian government minister
- Moilin Jean Ah-Chuen 朱梅麟: First Chinese Cabinet Minister, 1967–1976; First Chinese Member, Legislative Council, 1949
- Joseph Tsang Mang Kin 曾繁兴: Cabinet Minister, 1995–2000; as a poet, Tsang has written a number of poems on the Hakka culture

Government officials

- Bernard Yeung Sik Yuen 杨钦俊: Chief Justice, Mauritius, 2008–2013

Corporate

- Gaétan Siew: Architect. Past Secretary General of African Union of Architects. Past President of International Union of Architects
- Lawrence Wong: CEO of LaTrobe. President of Mauritius Cycling Federation

Sports

- Kevin Cheung: National swimmer
- Karen Foo Kune: National badminton player; Sportswoman of the Year, 2004 and 2009; Ranked number one badminton player in the African continent on several occasions, Member of Parliament (2024–)
- Kate Foo Kune: African Badminton Champion 2018, 2017
- Elodie Li Yuk Lo: National beach volleyball player
- Lim Kee Chong: International football referee
- Nathalie Lee Baw: swimmer
- Christophe Lim Wen Ying: swimmer
- Elodie Poo-cheong: swimmer
- Nicki Chan-Lam: British-born badminton player
- Alicia Kok Shun: swimmer
- Shannon Wong: Tennis

== See also ==
- Mauritian of African origin
- Mauritian of French origin
- Mauritian of Indian origin
- Mauritian Creole
- List of Sino-Mauritian dishes
