= List of Sino-Mauritian dishes =

Food in Sino-Mauritian cuisine

This is a list of Chinese and Chinese-influenced dishes in Sino-Mauritian cuisine:

== Main dishes ==
=== Poultry and eggs ===
Name in Mauritius	Mandarin Chinese	English	Description	Image
Dizef rouge	紅蛋, 紅雞蛋	Chinese red eggs	Hard boiled egg, dyed red and eaten with pickled ginger; shared with family members during a child's one-month old celebration.	Red eggs
		Chicken cooked in rice wine and ginger	Chicken cooked in rice wine and ginger; eaten during a child's one-month-old celebration.	

=== Rice ===
Name in Mauritius	Mandarin Chinese	English	Description	Image
Bol renversé (lit. 'upside down bowl')		Magic bowl	Rice-based dish served with a stir-fry sauce, similar to chop suey. Can contain meat, poultry, vegetables such as bok choy, and mushrooms. Usually topped with a fried egg.	Bol-renverse
Briyani porc		Pork biryani	Localization of Indian biryani; contains pork instead of beef or chicken	
Diri blanc	米饭 (mifan)	White rice	Plain, steamed white rice; a staple food	
Diri frir	炒饭 (chaofan)	Chinese fried rice	Basic Chinese fried rice	
Diri frir		Chicken fried rice with tomato chutney	Localization of Chinese fried rice, eaten with fresh tomato chutney	
Moonfan	闷饭 (munfan)			
Riz cantonais	广式炒饭 (Guangdong shi chaofan)	Cantonese-style fried rice		

=== Noodles ===
Type	Name in Mauritius	Mandarin Chinese	English	Description	Image
Rice flour	Meefoon frir	炒米粉	Fried meefoon	Fried rice vermicelli noodles	
Rice flour	Saho foon	沙河粉 (shahe fen)			
Wheat flour	Mine bouilli		Boiled noodles	Boiled noodles served without broth	
Wheat flour	Mine bouilli poulet (lit. 'boiled noodles with chicken').		Boiled noodles with chicken	Boiled noodles served without broth, topped with chicken	
Wheat flour	Mine frire	炒面 (chaomian)	Chow mein		A min frit janv 21

=== Dumplings ===
Type	Name in Mauritius	Mandarin Chinese	English	Description	Image
Seafood	Boulette poisson, Van yen	鱼丸 (yuwan), 鱼圆	Fish ball		
Seafood	En pow niuk			Steamed fish fingers	
Seafood	Haw gao	蝦餃 (xiajiao)	Har gow	Dumpling that typically contains prawn	
Meat	Boulette la vianne			Hakka-style beef ball	
Meat	Kiow	Jiaozi	Jiaozi		
Meat	Kiow	韭菜雞肉餃 (jiucai jirou jiao)	Leek and chicken dumplings		
Meat	Smiling char siu bao	開口笑叉燒包			
Meat	Spare pork ribs	清蒸排骨			
Meat	Wantan	Huntun / yuntun	Wonton		
Meat	Xiao loong bao	小笼包 (xiaolong bao)	Xiaolong bao	Small baozi served in dim sum	
Meat	Braised chicken feet	紅燒鳳爪			
Mixed vegetables and meat	Nioukyen, Boulette chou chou	肉丸, 肉圓		Traditional Hakka dish made of chayote and mixed with pork or chicken	
Mixed vegetables and meat	Saw maï, Siu mai	烧卖 (shaomai)	Shumai	Typically contains prawn, pork, or chicken, but can be vegetarian	
Mixed vegetables and meat	Steamed stuffed chilli	釀辣椒		Stuffed green chilli, typically filled with pork	
Mixed vegetables and meat	Steamed stuffed eggplant	釀茄子		Steamed stuffed eggplant, typically filled with fish	
Mixed vegetables and meat	Yong foo gah	酿苦瓜 (niang gu gua)	Stuffed bitter gourd	Hakka-style dish of bitter gourd stuffed with shrimp and fish paste	
Rice	Tangyuan	汤圆 (tangyuan)		Glutinous rice ball	
Rice	Sticky rice with lotus leaf	荷葉糯米飯			
Rice	Zong	Zongzi	Zongzi	Two types: sweet (Hakka-style) and salty (Cantonese-style); the sweet version is eaten with peanut powder. Wrapped in fatak leaves.	
Tofu	Teofu	純豆腐 (chun doufu)	Tofu	Extra soft tofu, often in small pieces	
Tofu	Teokon	豆干	Silken tofu	Firm to extra firm tofu, often cubed	
Tofu	Teokon farci, Nyong teokon	酿豆腐 (niangtoufu)	Yong tau foo	Extra firm tofu filled with ground meat (e.g. pork) mixture or fish paste	

=== Buns and bread ===
Type	Name in Mauritius	Mandarin Chinese	English	Description	Image
Steam bun	Bao, Pao	Baozi / bao	Baozi	Salty bao: a steam bun filled with chicken or pork, Chinese sausage, black mushroom, and soy egg (dizef roti)	
Steam bun	Bao, Pao	豆沙包 (dousha bao)	Baozi	Sweet bao: typically filled with red bean paste	
Steam bun	Bao char siu	叉燒包 (chāshāo bao)	Cha siu bao	Salty bao steamed buns usually filled with char siu (BBQ pork)	
Steam bun	Gua bao				

== Side dishes ==
Cooking Method	Name in Mauritius	Mandarin Chinese	English	Description	Image
Braised/ Roasted	Cha siu, Char siew, Cha shao	叉烧 (chāshāo)	Char siu	Cantonese-style barbecued pork	
Braised/ Roasted	Crispy chicken	脆皮雞		Crispy Cantonese-style roast chicken	
Braised/ Roasted	Foong moon choo niouk	红焖猪肉 (hongmen zhurou)	Red braised pork	Hakka-style red braised pork; pork belly or brisket cooked with sweet rice wine and rice rice (kiouk)	
Braised/ Roasted	Moy choy niouk	梅菜扣肉 (meicai gourou)		Hakka-stye fatty pork slices (typically pork belly) with dried mustard greens	
Braised/ Roasted	Moy choy niouk	梅菜扣肉 (meicai gourou)	Jiaoling (蕉岭)-style Meicai gourou	A variation where the pork slices are hidden under the mustard greens	
Braised/ Roasted	Peking duck	北京烤鴨			
Braised/ Roasted	Roast duck	烧鸭 (shaoya)			
Braised/ Roasted	Siuyuk, Siuyok, Shao zhu	燒肉 (shao rou)	Siu yuk	Crispy pork belly	Shaorou
Curing	Saucisse sinwa, Lap cheong	腊肠 (lachang)	Chinese sausage	Southern Chinese sausage	
Deep fried	Shrimp fooyang	蝦芙蓉蛋			
Salt-crust	Yam kuk gai	鹽焗雞/盐焗鸡 (yán jú jī)		Salt-baked chicken	
Steamed	Pak cham gai	白切鸡 (baiqieji)	White cut chicken	Steamed chicken	
Steamed	Steamed fish	蒸鱼 (zhengyu)		A steamed fresh whole fish	
Steamed	Steamed fish with ginger and green onion	清蒸魚 (qing zhengyu)		A steamed fresh whole fish with fresh ginger and green onion	
Stir fry	Black bean squid			Calamari with black bean sauce	
Stir fry	Poisson black bean		Black bean fish	Stir-fried fish with black bean sauce	
Stir fry	Prawns in garlic and butter			Tiger prawns stir-fried in garlic and butter	
Stir fry	Chop suey				
Stir fry	Zhai	罗汉菜 (luohan cai)	Buddha's delight		
Sweet and sour (called Aigre-doux)	Sweet and sour fish	糖醋魚		A sweet-and-sour dish made with fish filet, vegetables, and pineapple	
Sweet and sour (called Aigre-doux)	Sweet and sour lobster				
Sweet and sour (called Aigre-doux)	Sweet and sour squid				
Preserved food	Dizef cent ans	皮蛋 (pidan)	Century eggs	Century eggs eaten with pickle ginger	
Preserved food			Pickle ginger		

== Preserved vegetables ==
Name in Mauritius	Mandarin Chinese	English	Description	Image
Meicai gan	梅菜干	Meigan cai	Dry pickled Chinese mustard	
Dried mooli	萝卜干 (luobo gan)	Preserved salted daikon radish		
Hamchoy			Salted mustard greens	

== Soups and broths ==
Type	Name in Mauritius	Mandarin Chinese	English	Description	Image
Bean	Adzuki bean soup	红豆 (hongdou tang)		Sweet adzuki bean soup	
Bean	Mung bean soup	綠豆湯 (ludou tang)		Sweet soup made from mung bean	
Fungus	Snow fungus soup	银耳汤 (yin er tang)		Savoury soup made from snow fungus	
Noodle	Bouillon meefoon	米粉湯	Meefoon soup	Rice vermicelli noodle soup	
Noodle	Wonton noodle soup	雲吞湯麵			
Meat	Hot and sour soup	酸辣汤 (suanla tang)		Hot and sour soup with chicken	
Meat	Moon kiow			Deep-fried dumpling soup	
Meat	Sui kiow	水饺 (shuijiao)			
Meat	Wonton soup	雲吞湯		Wontons in a broth	
Meat	Swallow nest soup				
Rice	La soup diriz; Jook	粥 (zhou)	Rice congee	Plain rice porridge	
Seafood	Bouillon boulette poisson		Fishball soup	Fishballs cooked in a broth	
Seafood	Shark fin soup				
Vegetable-based (may contain meat or poultry)	Bouillon donghua		Winter melon soup		
Vegetable-based (may contain meat or poultry)	La soup maïs	鸡蛋玉米羹	Corn soup with chicken		

== Pastries, desserts, snacks and appetizers ==
=== Appetizers ===
Name in Mauritius	Mandarin Chinese	English	Description	Image
Crevette tempura	黃金麵包粉炸蝦	Shrimp tempura	Deep fried breaded prawns	
Crispy beef				
Crispy chicken				
Crispy squid				
Croquette crevette	粉漿酥炸蝦		Prawn croquette	
Dizef roti (lit. 'roasted egg')	卤蛋 (ludan)	Soy egg		
Dizef roti mimosa (lit. 'roasted mimosa egg')			Local variation of the Chinese soy egg, prepared to look like a mimosa egg	
Hakien		Spring roll	Hakka Sino-Mauritian version of the spring roll	
Wonton frir	酥炸雲吞 (suzha yuntun)	Fried wonton		

=== Savoury snacks ===
Name in Mauritius	Mandarin Chinese	English	Description	Image
Chipek, Sipek		Prawn cracker		
Gato arouille, Voo yan		Taro root fritters	Deep-fried taro balls	
Gato crab				
Gato cravate sale				
Gato les doigts, Yiw tia cu	油条 (youtiao)	Youtiao	Long strips of deep-fried dough	
Za teokon	炸豆干 (zha dougan)	Fried tofu		

=== Pastries, desserts, and sweet snacks ===
Name in Mauritius		Mandarin Chinese	English	Description	Image
Almond biscuit			Chinese almond biscuit		
Gai dan gow		鸡蛋糕 (jidan gao)		Steamed egg sponge cake	
Gato cravate sucre					
Gato la cire	Niangao	Niangao			
Gato la cire	Tiam pan	甜粄 (tianban)		Hakka-style glutinous rice cake; brown in colour	
Gato la lune	Chu chong kau/ Chu chong kow	豬腸糕		Hakka-style mooncake that looks like a white finger or Chinese banana roll (香蕉糕)	
Gato la lune	Kwi Fa kow				
Gato la lune	Ngin piang	五仁饼 (wu ren bing)	Five nut moon cake	Mooncake with 5 ingredients	
Gato la lune	Niat Kwong kow (lit. "Moon light cake")	Yueguangbing (Chinese: 月光饼; lit. 'moonlight cake')		Hakka-style mooncake made of rice powder that looks like a white, flat disc; can be adorned with designs of animals and flowers	
Gato la lune	Niat piang	月饼 (yuebing)	Mooncake	Cantonese-style moon cake commonly filled with: double egg-yolk; lotus paste; lotus paste with egg-yolk; red bean paste; peanuts	
Gato la lune	Nion Chee Kow/ Gato capsule			Used to be molded in Coca-Cola bottle caps, hence the name gato capsule	
Gato la lune	Voo ma Kow	Wu ma gao		Cake filled with black sesame paste and covered with white sesame seeds	
Gato la lune	zhixingao (直心糕)	白切糕 (bai qie gao)		Sliced white moon cake, filled with a thick layer sweet paste and containing black sesame seeds	
Gato macaroni		沙琪玛 (shaqima)	Sachima		
Gato pandan		班蘭蛋糕 (banlan dangao)	Pandan cake		
Gato zinzli	Jien-yan-e (煎丸欸)	Jiandui	Sesame ball	Sesame ball made of sweet potato, glutinous rice, or red bean paste. Deep fried until slightly chewy and crispy, and coated with sesame seeds.	
Gato zinzli		笑口棗 (kai kou xiao)	Smiling sesame balls	Deep fried sesame ball which split as if it is laughing	
Mi gau ban		味酵粄 (weijiaoban)		Hakka-style sweet and savoury steamed rice cake	
Pak tong pan				Water-bath glutinous rice cake	
Poutou rouge, Poutou chinois	Pot pan (發粄/发粄)	发糕 (fa gao)	Fa gao	Typically pink in colour in Mauritius; eaten year-round, but especially during Chinese New Year.	Poutou Chinois
Sagoo au lait de coco		西米露	Sai mai lo	Dessert containing sago and coconut milk	
Steamed rice cake		蒸糯米糕		Steamed glutinous rice cake	
Teosa, Towsa	Teosa piang			Flaky pastries filled with sweet lentil paste	
		清明粄 (qingmingban)		Hakka-style sweet snack which looks like a green, flat disc	
		印花粄 (yìnhuābǎn)		Hakka-style sweet snack; white and round, with an embossed print on the top surface	

== Traditional Chinese sweets ==
Type	Name in Mauritius	Mandarin Chinese	English	Description	Image
Candy	Sesame seed candy	花生芝麻糖		Brittle, nougat-like bar containing sesame seeds	
Candy	Peanut candy	花生糖		Brittle, nougat-like bar containing peanuts	
Candy	Gato la lune, Fan teow tang	花生芝麻糖		Brittle, nougat-like bar containing both peanuts and sesame seeds	
Imported products	Chin pui mui		Chan Pui Mui preserved plum	A sweet, preserved plum (Chan Pui Mui brand)	
Imported products	Li hing mui	白话梅		Salted dried plum	
Imported products	Losti		Haw flakes	Traditional Chinese sweet made from the fruit of the Chinese hawthorn	Hawflakes

== Beverages ==
Name in Mauritius	Mandarin Chinese	English	Description	Image
Bubble tea				
Chrysanthemum tea				
Green tea	绿茶 (lu cha)			
Jasmine tea				
La mousse noir		Grass jelly drink		
Leung cha	涼茶 (liangcha)			
Soymilk				

== Sauce and condiments ==
Name in Mauritius	Mandarin Chinese	English	Description	Image
Black bean sauce	蒜蓉豆豉酱 (suanrong douchijiang)			
Char siu sauce	叉烧酱 (chashao jiang)			
Green chilli paste			Spicy dipping sauce	
Hoisin sauce	海鲜酱 (haixianjiang)			
La sauce l'ail			Dipping sauce, usually eaten with fried food	La Marmite Mauricienne (Flic-en-Flac) – Mauritian sauce à l'ail
Oyster sauce	蚝油 (haoyou)			
Plum sauce	苏梅酱 (sumei jiang)			
Red chilli paste			Spicy dipping sauce	
Siaw	生抽	Light soy sauce		
Siaw noir	老抽	Dark soy sauce		
Siaw poisson	鱼露	Fish sauce		

== See also ==
- Mauritians of Chinese origin
- Mauritian cuisine
- Culture of Mauritius
