= Misao (food) =

Misao (also known as Minsao or Mine Sao) is a fusion of Chinese cuisine and Malagasy cuisine. It is a common Malagasy cuisine. Misao is basically ramen noodles served with stir-fried vegetable. Misao can be topped with eggs or any other kind of meat as preferred.

== See also ==
- Malagasy cuisine
