= Hahime Choisanne =

First Kapitan of the Chinese community in British Mauritius

- 陆才新
- Born: Lok Choi Sin; Unknown; Fujian Tulou, China
- Died: 1874

Hahime Choisanne (?–1874), also written as Hayme, Ahime, or Hahyme Choisanne based on his Chinese name Lu Caixin (Chinese: 陆 才新; pinyin: Lù Cáixīn), pronounced Lok Choi Sin in Fujian dialect (also written as Liok Choisin) and Look Soi San (also written as Look Tsoi San) in Cantonese dialect, was successful Ethnic Chinese merchant. He arrived in British Mauritius in 1816 and was naturalized in 1847. (Note: See Ordinances No. 31 of 1847) He became one of the prominent leading figures for the Chinese community during the colonial period of Mauritius and is recognized as having contributed to the boost of Chinese trading community to Mauritius during the British colonial period. He was also the founding father of the Kwan Tee Pagoda, founded in 1842, at Les Salines, Mauritius, a pagoda associated with the cult of Guan Di, the god of wealth, war, and the righteous and the benefactor. Choisanne was succeeded by Affan Tank Wen, who became the second Kapitan of the Chinese community in Mauritius.

== Leader of the Chinese community ==
In 1821, Hahime Choisanne petitioned to the British authorities to allow the coming of his Chinese compatriots to Mauritius and received the full support of the first Governor of Mauritius, Robert Townsend Farquhar (tenure from 4 December 1810 to 20 May 1823), who then appointed him as the Kapitan, i.e. the Leader of the Port Louis Chinese.He also received the official license to bring immigrants from China to the island of Mauritius but at his own expenses. Choisanne, thus, left Mauritius in 1822 returning to China; he only returned to Mauritius in 1826 on the ship Belle Alliance with at least four other Chinese men: Whangoo, Hankee, Nghien, and Hakhim. The next few years, Choisanne acted as the guarantor for several of his compatriots who arrived on Mauritius.

As the numbers of Chinese immigrants started growing, Choisanne started sponsoring members of his family to immigrate in Mauritius on the ground of trades employment, such as joinery and shoe-making, between 1841 and 1846, and were permitted to reside in Mauritius despite the authorities' suspicions that they would enter in the commerce field instead.

== Life as a shopkeeper and commerce restrictions ==
By the year 1837, Choisanne already owned three shops in the Port Louis, the capital of Mauritius; and his success and along with the success of Chinese businessmen in Mauritius made Chinese immigration to Mauritius an attractive option. The local British authorities, however, started to be worried over the scale of Chinese commercial operations on the island, and thus, the Police Chief initially refused to issue licenses to Choisanne for all three of his properties until the Governor of Mauritius had to intervene in his favour. A fourth shop was eventually opened with a license being granted however, this time Choisanne received a warning threat from the Governor:

[...] if any other Chinamen than those authorized are found employed in any of your shops, you will forfeit the licenses now granted; besides the men being subject to immediate removal from the colony

In 1846, Choisanne asked for the renewal residence permit of his nephew, Lock Affoah, as well as a shop license of Affoah, the first request was granted by the Governor of Mauritius; however, the second was rejected. The British authorities attempted to restrict the arriving Chinese immigrants to enter the commerce field as the colony was in dire need for labourers and was providing permits for these reasons; the permits were not for would-be businessmen.

== See also ==
- Mauritians of Chinese origin
- Joseph Tsang Mang Kin
- Affan Tank Wen
