= Joseph Tsang Mang Kin =

Mauritian poet, political scientist and biographer (1938–2024)

Joseph Tsang Mang Kin, GOSK
- 曾繁興
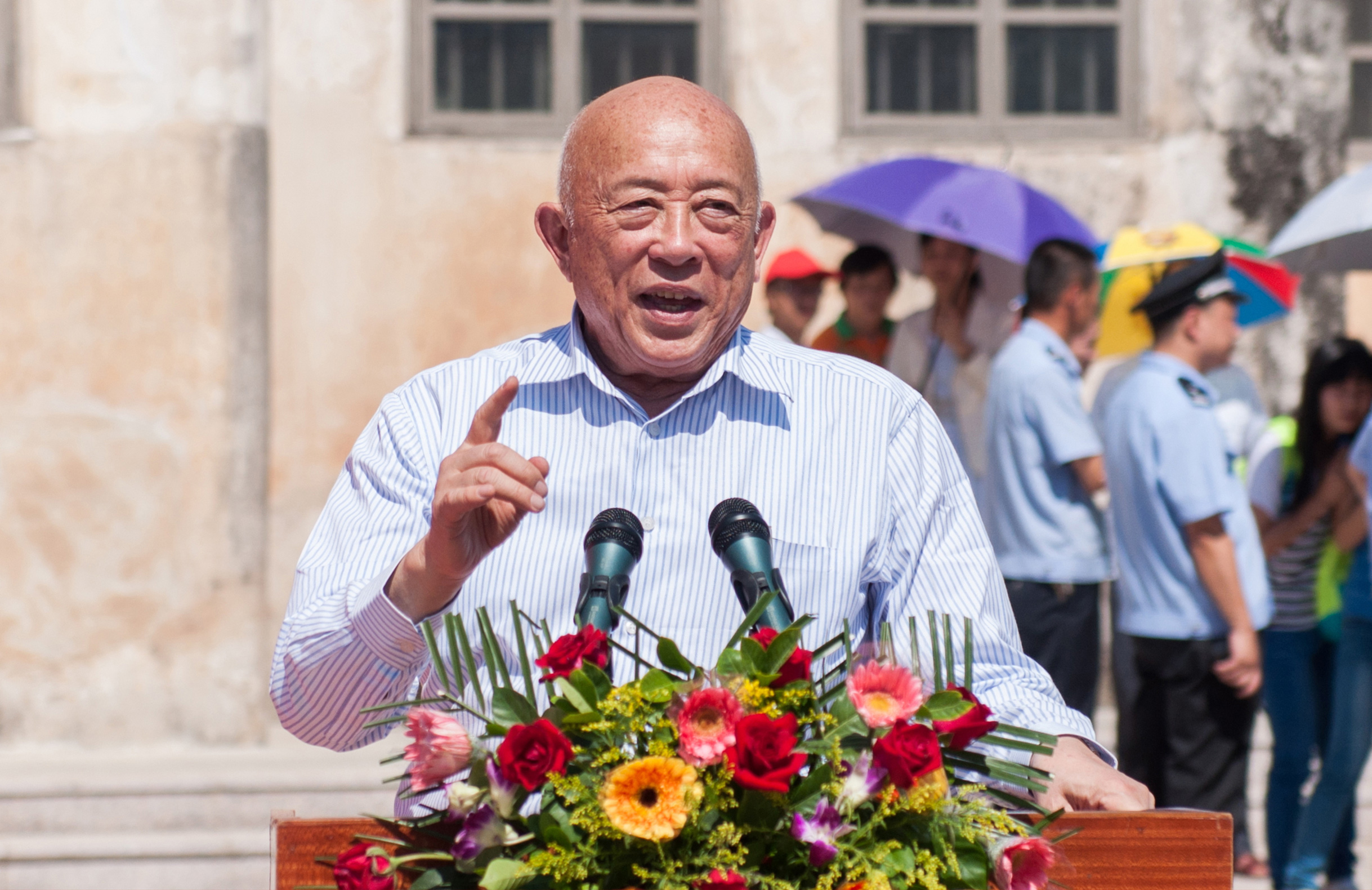
- Born: Joseph Tsang Mang Kin; 12 March 1938; Port-Louis, British Mauritius
- Died: 16 November 2024 (aged 86)
- Education: Royal College of Port-Louis, University of London, Graduate Institute of International Studies, Geneva
- Occupations: Panel Member of Eminent Persons – APRM African Union, Writer
- Writing career
- Genres: Poetry, Essays, History, Plays, Biography
- Subjects: Philosophy, History, Biography, Politics
- Notable awards: GOSK

Joseph Tsang Mang Kin, GOSK (officially: Tsang Fan Hin Tsang Mang Kin; 12 March 1938 – 16 November 2024) was a Mauritian poet, political scientist, philosopher, and biographer.

Tsang Mang Kin originally worked as a diplomat and politician; becoming Secretary General of the Mauritius Labor Party, a Member of the Parliament, and Minister of Arts and Culture,

He later operated as a panel member of the African Peer Review Mechanism, African Union.

Fond of poetry, history, and philosophy and writing in both French and English, he produced hundreds of sonnets, essays, plays on topics related to the history of Mauritius, slavery and religion in the Indian Ocean, Mauritius diplomacy, Mauritian literature, the Francophonie, the first centuries of Christianity, the people and the Hakka culture, Chinese philosophy, especially Taoism, French and Egyptian freemasonry and the cultural divide between China and the West.

== Early life and education ==
Joseph Tsang Mang Kin was born on 12 March 1938, in Chinatown, Port-Louis, Mauritius, as the second child of the family. Willy Tsang Mang Kin, his father, born in 1910, was a Chinese, namely Hakka, immigrant from Moyen, Canton, who settled in Mauritius in 1932, at age 22, and his mother, Solange Atuchen (Wong Sen Siou), was born at Mount Estate, Pamplemousses, Mauritius in 1920. In 1940, Pierre-Michel Tsang Mang Kin, Joseph's only senior sibling, died at age 3, giving Joseph seniority over the upcoming 11 brothers and sisters.

Joseph Tsang Mang Kin was brought up in a totally Hakka environment and attended the Chinese Middle School in China Town, Port-Louis, Mauritius, from 1942 to 1946. In 1947, he attended l'Ecole des Cassis, government public school in Port-Louis up to 1949. In January 1950, he was admitted to the Royal College Port-Louis which he left in 1956, after obtaining his Higher School Certificate.

Raised and educated in the Mauritian capital, Port-Louis, Joseph started dabbling in poetry as a teenager at age 14, composing his first sonnet in 1952, entitled: " Ode to Inspiration", followed by several compilations which he later published, generally orbiting around Philosophy.

== Teaching career ==
In 1957, at age 18, he began working as a reporter in the Chinese Daily News, teaching at the Bhujoharry College and the St Andrew's School, while studying in parallel for his B.A (honors) in English and French from the University of London, subsequently graduating in 1960. In 1961, he married Marie Reine Yuen, and had three children : Oswald, Sabrina, and Deborah. From 1962 to 1967, he continued his teaching career at the Royal College of Port-Louis.

== Diplomatic career ==
After training as a diplomat at the Graduate Institute of International Studies (HEI) in Geneva, Switzerland, with a fellowship from the Carnegie Endowment fellowship for training in diplomacy, he was chosen by Sir Seewoosagur Ramgoolam and sent to Paris to establish the Mauritian Embassy in August 1968, as the Second Secretary of the Ambassador.

In September 1972, he went to Brussels to found another Mauritian Embassy, serving as the First Secretary, and eventually, First Counselor where he participated in negotiations leading up to the signature of Lome I and the Sugar Protocol.

In March 1977, he went back to the Ministry of External Affairs as Minister Counselor and head of the International Division up to 1983.

== International civil servant ==
In December 1983, he was appointed deputy director of the Commonwealth Foundation in London, where he stayed until 1990. He launched a series of new projects relating to the strengthening and networking of professional associations in the Commonwealth. He then set up Commonwealth Liaison Units in each and every Commonwealth country to group and network local Non-Governmental Organisations to better address issues of direct interest to them at both local, regional and Commonwealth levels. He launched new projects like the Commonwealth Writers' Prize, the Arts and Crafts Prize and formed part of the panel of the Commonwealth Poetry Prize.

== Political career ==
After retiring from Civil Service in 1991, Tsang Mang Kin began his political career as the Secretary General of the Mauritius Labor Party from 1991 to 1996, and after being elected in December 1995 as a Deputy for the Mauritius Labor Party, he eventually occupied the post of Minister of Arts, Culture and Leisure, Minister of Public Service, and Minister of Arts and Culture over the course of his 5-year mandate up to September 2000.

Tsang Mang Kin left the Ministry of Foreign Affairs in 1991 to join the Mauritius Labour Party and became its Secretary General from 1991 to 2000. He was elected Member of the Parliament in the constituency no.2, Port Louis, and was appointed Minister of Arts and Culture in 1995, where he set up the National Library, the National Gallery of Art, the Museum of History Maurice, and the Nelson Mandela Centre for African Culture.

He established a dozen CLAC, Centre de Lecture et d'Activities Culturelles in Mauritius and in Rodrigues. He also put up the Sir Seewoosagur Ramgoolam statue on the Port-Louis waterfront. He set up the Mahebourg Open Air Theatre at Pointe Canon, Mahebourg, and the Serge Constantin Theatre in Vacoas. He also established strategic links with France, Britain, India and South Africa to create a film industry in Mauritius, and encouraged using Mauritius as a film-making center.

Tsang Mang Kin introduced the celebration of the Music Day and the Creators and Performers Day. He renovated the paintings of Liuk Chey Sin, founder of Chinese Presence in Mauritius and builder of Kwan Tee pagoda, and of Affan Tankwen, first and second leaders of the Chinese Community.

== Conferences and literary activities ==
Tsang Mang Kin participated in forums in Canada, Europe, Africa (Lesotho, Zambia) and Asia (Malaysia) and the islands of the Indian Ocean on the diaspora, slavery, Chinese culture and transcultural. He has just completed a series of Thematic timelines on the Social and Political History of Mauritius, in the Dutch, French and British Slavery and Religion and Chinese. It complements a Chronology of the Mauritian Literature. His poem compilation, Le Grant Chant Hakka was reconstructed in English; The Hakka Epic and translated into Chinese, 客家人之歌. He recently completed a history of the English and French Freemasonry in the islands of the Indian Ocean – Mauritius, Reunion, Madagascar and the Seychelles.

In 1973, he founded, with ambassador Raymond Chasle and poet Jean-Claude d'Avoine, l'Etoile et la Clef, Revue de Poesie et de Literature.

In October 1976, he was a speaker at a conference on the theme Langues et Nation, organised by l'Institut supérieur de traducteurs et interprètes.

In December 2000, he was the keynote speaker in the Hakka Conference, Toronto 2000, Vari Hall, York University.

In May 2004, he was a speaker at the Université de la Réunion on the occasion of the International year commemorating the fight against slavery and for its abolition: Memoire Orale et Esclavage.

In January 2008, he was a speaker at the Investing in Cultural Diversity and Intercultural Dialogue organised by UNESCOCAT, Centre UNESCO de Catalunya, Barcelona.

In April 2009, he was appointed consultant for the Hakka Diaspora Encyclopedia by the Hakka Commission in Zhangzhou, China.

From April 2009 to April 2011, he was appointed Visiting Professor at the Hakka Institute of Jia Ying University in Meixian, Guangzhou.

In 2011, he was appointed Overseas Representative of the Zeng clan for the inauguration of the Hakka Memorial in Fangcheng, China, marking the homeland of the Zeng clan before their migration to Shandong.

An essayist and poet writing in both English and French has produced numerous papers on a wide range of subjects including the cultural divide between east and west, the Chinese psyche, diasporas, slavery, colonization, world affairs, freemasonry. He regularly participated in forums including UNESCO, the Commonwealth and Universities in Canada, Reunion Island, China, Mauritius.

== Business and enterprise ==
In 2004, Tsang Mang Kin became the Chairman of the King Group, a group of companies including London Satellite Systems, Mont Choisy Hotel and Fast Shipping (Evergreen). He also was the Chairman of RedSat Holding Ltd. From 2007 to 2010, he was the director of the Film Investment Managers of Indian Film Company. From 2005, he was the Chairman of CNAM-Maurice, Conservatoire National des Arts et Metiers.

In 2013, he won the Brilliance of China award.

He was also elected, in 2013, as a member of the panel of the African Peer Review Mechanism for the African Union.

== Other activities ==
From 2006, he was a Smart Partner of the Commonwealth Partnership for Technology Management, CPTM. He was also a member of its International Advisory Council. In 2011, he was the vice-president of the Mauritian Writers' Association. From 2012 to 2013, he was the Chairman of the Guan Di Association.

On 26 January 2013, he was appointed member of the panel of Eminent Personalities of the African Peer Review Mechanism, African Union.

== Personal life and death ==
Tsang Mang Kin was married with three children and four grandchildren. He died on 16 November 2024, at the age of 86.

== Bibliography ==
Year	Genre	Title	ISBN
1959	Poetry	Paupieres Vitales
1962	Poetry	Poesies : Legendaire, Seduire la Mort, Instantanes, Vie Multiple
1970	Play	Le Capitaine
1975	Poetry	Paroles a l'Heure Heliaque, Au lieu du Centre, Exode et Le Point s'aligne in l'Etoile et la Clef
1989	Essay	Mauritian Missions Abroad – What for?
1991	Report	Projet de Creation de l'Universite de l'Ocean Indien [ Avec Reynald Lamy ]
1991	Essay	Francophonie Mauricienne
1993	Translation	Freemasonry – A European Viewpoint [La Franc-maconnerie by Paul Naudon]	0-7104-5004-4
1996	Poetry	Le Grand Chant Hakka [ Meaning : The Great Hakka Song ]
2000	Biography	Log Choisanne, Fondateur de la Pagode Kwan Tee (1796–1874)
2002	Poetry	The Hakka Epic in Chinese, 客家人之歌	99903-41-28-1
2003	Poetry	The Hakka Epic, First Edition	99903-974-0-6
2005	Essay	L'Heritage d'Hermes, Les Rites Egyptiens de Memphis-Misraim
2005	Biography	Tooblall Hawoldar, Heritiers de la Sagesse venue des Pentes de l'Himalaya (1918–2004)
2008	History	Les Heritiers de la Franc-Maconnerie Egyptienne de Memphis-Misraim [ Meaning : The Heirs of the Egyptian Freemasonry of Memphis-Misraim ]	978-99903-66-27-3
2008	Poetry	Entering the Chinese Mind	978-0-9554402-1-2
2008	Essay	Hakka and Huaren Destiny	978-99903-994-6-2
2009	Biography	Destins Croises, Parcours aupres de Raymond Chasle, Poete et Diplomate [ Meaning : Crossroads, Trip alongside Raymond Chasle, Poet and Diplomat ]	978-99903-0-592-0
2010	Poetry	Stopovers in a Poet's World	978-99903-9-746-8
2010	Biography	Sir Seewoosagur Ramgoolam, The Rare Diplomat	978-99903-0-626-2
2011	Poetry	The Hakka Epic, Second Edition	978-99903-22-39-2
2012	Poetry	The Hakka Epic, Second Edition, in Chinese, 客家史诗	978-99903-22-53-8

== Honours ==
- Tsang Mang Kin was made Chevalier (Knight) of the Ordre du Lion on 25 October 1991
- In 1996, he was made Chevalier (Knight) of the Ordre des Palmes Académiques
- In 2011, he was made Grand Officer of the Order of the Star and Key of the Indian Ocean, G.O.S.K (National Award from the Government of Mauritius)
- In 2013, he obtained the Brilliance of China Award certificate, 中华之光 – The Brilliance of China Choice for Chinese Culture Promoters of the Year, Beijing, CCTV4
