= Mofo gasy =

Malagasy traditional recipe

Mofo Gasy, translated as "Malagasy bread", is a Malagasy traditional recipe typically eaten as a breakfast. It consists mainly of rice flour and sugar fried within a specific mold. Mofo gasy can also be made with coconut milk. Variations of the recipe occur based on the regions of Madagascar.

== History ==
Mofo gasy is believed to originate from Asian and African culinary influences that have shaped Madagascar’s food culture.

Traditionally sold by street vendors, it has become a staple part of daily Malagasy cuisine.

Its traditional preparation has been passed down through generations, although modern variations have emerged, including the addition of ingredients such as vanilla or coconut.
