= Sino-Seychellois =

Inhabitants of Seychellois of Chinese heritage

Total population
- c. 1,000 (1999)

Regions with significant populations
- Mont Fleuri

Languages
- Seychellois Creole; Chinese (Mandarin, Cantonese, Hakka & Hokkien) not widely spoken, English, French

Religion
- Roman Catholicism

Related ethnic groups
- Sino-Mauritians

Sino-Seychellois are overseas Chinese who reside in Seychelles. In 1999, their population was estimated at 1,000 individuals, making them one of Africa's smaller Chinese communities.

== History ==
The first Chinese immigrants to Seychelles arrived from Mauritius in 1886. Until around 1940, it was common for a Sino-Mauritian to bring his relatives over from China to Mauritius for a period of apprenticeship in his business; after they had gained sufficient familiarity with commercial practises and life in a colonial society, he would send them onwards with letters of introduction, lending them his own capital to start up businesses in neighbouring regions, including Seychelles.

Like in other overseas Chinese communities, rivalry between Cantonese- and Hakka-speakers was a common feature of their social life. The two separate groups lived in different areas and even refused to marry each other, instead preferring to marry local women of African descent. They started out working on vanilla plantations, but quickly turned to shopkeeping, transport, and fishing.

== Language, education, and culture ==
In 1945, Richard Man-Cham, the father of future Prime Minister James Mancham, requested government permission to open a Chinese school. The government responded coldly to the idea. Formal Chinese language education would not be established in Seychelles until 2007, when the People's Republic of China sent a teacher to work with the adult and distance education department of Seychelles' Ministry of Education. Today, most Sino-Seychellois do not speak Chinese, though they may understand it.

== Notable individuals ==
- Sir James Mancham, descendant of a Chinese immigrant grandfather
- Anglican Archbishop French Chang-Him, descendant of a Chinese father
- Li Huarong, Deputy Minister
- Nicole Chang-Leng, Seychelles' first female pilot and captain
