= Chinese people in Madagascar =

Chinese people in Madagascar Sinoa eto Madagasikara
馬達加斯加華人

Total population
- 70,000–100,000 (2011)

Regions with significant populations
- Toamasina · Antananarivo

Languages
- Chinese (Cantonese · Mandarin), Malagasy, French

Religion
- Catholicism

Related ethnic groups
- Sino-Mauritians

Chinese people in Madagascar (Chinese: 馬達加斯加華人, Malagasy: Sinoa eto Madagasikara) are a minority ethnic group of Madagascar and form Africa's third largest overseas Chinese population with a population estimated at between 70,000 and 100,000 in 2011. They are divided between local Chinese population called "Sinoa zanatany" who arrived during the French colonization, speaking mostly Malagasy dialects, located in eastern and southeastern part of Madagascar and post-colonial Chinese migrants speaking mostly Mandarin who live mainly in the capital Antananarivo.

== History ==
=== Early history ===
Chinese ceramic goods dating to the 16th and 17th century have been found in Madagascar; however, these are generally believed not to be evidence of a direct Chinese presence at that early date, but rather trade between the two lands through intermediaries such as the Arabs. Some folk theories once popular among the Chinese of Madagascar claimed a Chinese rather than Austronesian origin for the Malagasy, and a widespread joke even claimed that the ethnonym Hova was a transcription of a Chinese name He Huai (何壞). Suggestions were made in 1786 and 1830 that the French should establish a colony and import Chinese, Indian, and Mozambican labour to Madagascar to populate it in order to prevent the British from gaining a foothold there, but no action was taken on the idea.

The first Chinese migrant to Madagascar arrived in the east coast port of Tamatave (now renamed Toamasina) in 1862, where he opened a shop, and later married a local Malagasy woman. Six others came to Nosy Be off the northwestern coast in 1866, then three more in 1872. Fourteen were noted at Majunga (Mahajanga), also in the northwest, in 1894. Then, a contingent of five hundred arrived at Tamatave in 1896. The following year, three thousand more Chinese labourers were brought in at the initiative of the French general Joseph Gallieni to work on the construction of the railway. Contract workers, intending to return home after their stint on the island, often became ill while working on the construction of the railway; though they survived to board ships back to China, many died en route. In absolute terms the resident population remained quite small: 452 in 1904, with 76 in the north, 31 in the west, 24 in the centre, 315 in the east, and 6 in the south. The vast majority were men. They had grown slightly by the time of the 1911 census, which found 649 Chinese in the country, making up about 3% of the country's foreign population and a minor fraction of the total population of 3.2 million.

The initial migrants came from Guangxi, but were later supplemented by Cantonese-speakers, both those who came directly from Guangdong and those who had been driven out of Mauritius by increasing competition from Hakka-speakers. Upon arrival, the Cantonese speakers colluded to prevent any Hakka migration to Madagascar. As a result, the Chinese population remained largely homogenous; 98% traced their origins not just to Guangdong, but specifically to the Shunde district. Intermarriage between Chinese men and native Malagasy women was not uncommon.

=== Post-World War II and independence ===
1957 official statistics showed 7,349 Chinese living in Madagascar, in forty-eight of the country's fifty-eight districts. By 2006, that number had grown to roughly forty thousand, composed of thirty thousand of the original migrants and their descendants, as well as ten thousand new expatriates from mainland China, and another hundred from Taiwan. The recent migrants trace their origins to a more diverse set of provinces, including Fujian and Zhejiang. Half lived in either Toamasina or Antananarivo, with a further one-eighth in the Diana Region; the remainder were distributed among the other provinces.

== Society ==
Chinese-language education in Madagascar began in the late 1920s; with the 1937 onset of the Second Sino-Japanese War, Chinese parents could no longer send their children back to China for their schooling, which fueled the expansion of local Chinese education. Two of the most well-known schools, the Kuomintang-run École Franco-Chinoise (興文學校) in Fenerive, and the co-educational École Chinoise Mixte (華体学校) in Toamasina, were both established the following year. The École Chinoise Mixte at Toamasina was founded by parents who had withdrawn their children from the KMT school; they were alleged to be communist. By 1946, the island boasted eleven Chinese schools. However, after the end of World War II, and especially in the 1980s, parents began shifting their children towards French-language education instead. As a result, the number of schools decreased, and the ones which remained decreased the number of class hours devoted to Chinese-language teaching. Of eight schools in 1972, three disappeared by the mid-1980s; the École Franco-Chinoise, which at its peak had enrolled 629 students, was forced to merge with the École Chinoise Mixte to form the Collège de la Congrégation Chinoise (華僑學校).

By 1995, only two schools remained, in Fianarantsoa and Toamasina. The one in Toamasina, the Collège de la Congrégation Chinoise, enrolled 398 students at the kindergarten through lower secondary levels as of 2008; it continues teaching both Cantonese and Mandarin. The school in Fianarantsoa had about 100 students, including mixed-race children of Chinese and Malagasy descent, as well as non-Chinese children.

For tertiary education, by the 1960s a few Chinese students went on to Francophone universities in Madagascar or in France. In 1957, the École Franco-Chinoise began sending students to Taiwan for education, starting with nine in the first year and totalling 34 by 1964. These students tended to attend the Overseas Chinese Preparatory High School (now part of National Taiwan Normal University) before going on to their degree work; many had trouble with Mandarin. Some returned to Madagascar, but found difficulties in advancement there due to the non-recognition of their degrees.

The Confucius Institute opened a branch at the University of Antananarivo in November 2008. By June 2013, more than 28 Chinese language teaching institutes had been established across the country.

=== Religious affiliation ===
The Chinese of Madagascar, like the rest of the urban Malagasy populace, are largely Catholic. Questionnaires in the 1970s found that Catholicism was especially common among young people under 30. However another study noted that many however were Catholics in name only. There were also examples of syncretism with Chinese folk religion in those days: the Chinese Community Centers in Tamatave (Toamasina) and Diego Suarez (Antsiranana) had altars to Southern Chinese deities, and a few people could still be seen paying their respects; furthermore, some people reported that their families had altars for veneration of their ancestors.

== Economy ==
Chinese came not just as indentured labourers, but as free migrants too. Often, a Sino-Mauritian would bring his relatives over from China to Mauritius for a period of apprenticeship in his business; after they had gained sufficient familiarity with commercial practises and life in a colonial society, he would send them onwards with letters of introduction, lending them his own capital to start up businesses in neighbouring countries, including Madagascar. Import-export was one popular business, with products such as coffee, cloves, vanilla beans, and sea cucumbers flowing outwards.

Most of the Chinese in Madagascar are engaged in retail business. In the 1990s, they controlled half of the alcoholic beverages and textiles industries; by the mid-2000s, their share of the alcoholic beverages industry had fallen to one-fifth, while that of the textiles industry had increased to 90%. Others operated cake shops and ice-cream parlours, somewhat along the lines of coffee shops, where customers could sit down and enjoy a dessert; they controlled about 10% of this industry. Popular resentment at the recent influx of Chinese small traders, whose prices undercut those of their Malagasy competitors, has strained relations with the People's Republic of China.

== See also ==
- China–Madagascar relations
