= Mauritians of Indian origin =

Mauritians who trace their ethnic ancestry from India

Indo-Mauritians
- Mauritius

Total population
- 812,769; 65.7% of the population of Mauritius (2011)

Languages
- Mauritian Creole; Mauritian Bhojpuri; Hindi-Urdu; Tamil; Telugu; Marathi; other South Asian languages; English; French

Religion
- Majority: Hinduism; Minority: Islam · Christianity

Related ethnic groups
- Bihari Mauritians · Tamil Mauritians · Marathi diaspora · Telugu diaspora · Bihari-U.P. diaspora · Tamil diaspora · Indian diaspora in Southeast Africa · Indo-Caribbeans · Indo-Fijians · Indian South Africans · Indo-Seychellois · Malaysian Indians · Indian Singaporeans · Indian people · Indian diaspora

Indo-Mauritians are Mauritians who trace their ethnic ancestry to the Republic of India or other parts of the Indian subcontinent in South Asia.

== History ==
During the administration of the French East India Company until 1767 and subsequent French rule at least 12,000 workers arrived from India between 1721 and 1810 before the abolition of slavery. These first Indian immigrants came from various parts of India such as Pondicherry, Karikal, Yanaon, Chandernagor and others. They worked under contract as skilled stonemasons, blacksmiths, and carpenters although hundreds of them were slaves. Some Malbars from Reunion (Bourbon) Island were also brought to work with them. After the legislative changes of 1767, these Indian immigrants were allowed to start their own businesses, buy land and own slaves.

Following the November 1810 British Invasion from the northern coast, the island came under British rule. With the liberation of about 65,000 African and Malagasy slaves after the 1833 abolition of slavery the Franco-Mauritian plantation owners and sugar oligarchs resorted to indentured labourers, or Coolies, from various parts of India to work in their fields. Between 1834 and 1920, nearly 700,000 Indian indentured labourers arrived at Aapravasi Ghat, an embankment located in the harbour of Port-Louis. Mauritius thus became the British colony's largest recipient of Indian indentured migrants. Indentured labourers were mostly brought from the Bhojpuri speaking regions of Bihar and Uttar Pradesh, with a large number of Tamils, Telugus and Marathis amongst them. The descendants of these indentured labourers make up two-thirds of the island's current population.

As free immigrants, these later arrivals were commonly employed by the British in the armed forces, police forces, as security personnel with a substantial portion of immigrants from Gujarat and Sindh arriving as traders, businessmen, and merchants.

In the late 19th to early 20th century, Chinese men in Mauritius married Indian women due to both a lack of Chinese women and the higher numbers of Indian women on the island. The 1921 census in Mauritius counted that Indian women there had a total of 148 children fathered by Chinese men. These Chinese immigrants were mostly traders.

== Demographics ==
Today the population consists of mainly Hindus with Muslim, Christian and Baháʼí Faith minorities. The mother tongue of almost all Mauritians is the Mauritian Creole, while a minority of Indo-Mauritians still use both their ancestral language and Creole at home. Indo-Mauritian use their ancestral languages mostly in religious activities, some of them include Mauritian Bhojpuri, Tamil, Hindi, Marathi, Telugu and Urdu.

As from age six, all Mauritian children must learn a third language at school (French and English are already compulsory). The languages learnt in decreasing order are Hindi, Urdu, Tamil, Chinese, Marathi and Telugu. Mauritian Creoles can opt for Mauritian Creole as the third language. Choice is usually based on ethno-religious background with Hindi, Tamil, Telugu and Marathi chosen by Hindus who belong to the respective ethnicities and Urdu by Muslims from the Indian subcontinent.

In addition to these, Sanskrit and Mauritian Bhojpuri courses are offered by the Mahatma Gandhi Institute.

MBhojpuri, once widely spoken as a mother tongue, has become less commonly spoken over the years. According to the 2022 census, Bhojpuri was spoken by 5.1% of the population compared to 12.1% in 2000.

== Indian influence ==
Indo-Mauritians have influenced Mauritian culture, dominating the economic, public sector and political faces of the island. Mauritian politics have been historically dominated by the Indo-Mauritian community due to their majority as a whole on the electoral platform. All presidents except Karl Offmann and all prime ministers except for Paul Berenger have been members of this community. Five Hindu festivals are public holidays. Indian influence is not only felt in religions, cuisines and arts but also in the local music of the island where it has its own groups of Bhojpuri and Tamil bands. Indian films from Bollywood in Hindi and Kollywood in Tamil are also widely popular.

== Caste system ==
Due to local demographic realities, most notably a Vaish majority among Hindus and the lack of a clear religious absolute majority in the country, the Indian Hindu caste system was not directly implemented in the Mauritian context. The indentured labour system and the plantation economy further weakened pre existing caste structures.

While Mauritian Muslims have diversity in sectarian affiliations (namely Sunni, Shia, and so on), they are rather averse to describing themselves as such, owing to the divisions such distinctions create. The Hindu caste system is not the case with Indo-Mauritian Muslims.

From the Indian-origin Chamar caste, the locally formed Ravived subcaste appeared.

During the 19th century (1834 onward), many Dalits, including Chamars (leather-working caste), migrated to Mauritius as indentured laborers under British rule. Those who were followers of Guru Ravidas began identifying collectively as Ravived to affirm a dignified identity. With time the term 'Ravived' became the preferred name in Mauritius to distance from the derogatory label of 'Chamar.'

In the ship records on which Indian laborers migrated to Mauritius, around ten percent of the boarded people mentioned their caste as Chamar. After the establishment of caste hierarchies in Mauritius, the Chamar community families turned to the religious songs of Kabir and Ravidas for their own religious outlet. Slowly, they started adopting religious-sounding names from these devotional songs.

== Sports ==
Football is the most popular sport amongst Mauritians. Vikash Dhorasoo, who played for the French football team, is of Indo-Mauritian origin. His ancestors were Telugus from Andhra Pradesh.

== Notable people ==
- Nathacha Appanah
- Amode Ibrahim Atchia
- Michael Atchia
- Viveka Babajee
- Bhinod Bacha
- Sheila Bappoo
- Rashid Beebeejaun
- Sunil Benimadhu
- Kader Bhayat
- Heeralall Bhugaloo
- Basdeo Bissoondoyal
- Sookdeo Bissoondoyal
- Nando Bodha
- Harish Boodhoo
- Arvin Boolell
- Satcam Boolell
- Satyajit Boolell
- Suella Braverman
- Vasant Bunwaree
- Dayendranath Burrenchobay
- Dan Callikan
- Siddick Chady
- Angidi Chettiar
- Shirin Aumeeruddy-Cziffra
- Kishore Deerpalsing
- Vikash Dhorasoo
- Gaëtan Duval
- Xavier-Luc Duval
- Abdool Wahab Foondun
- Alan Ganoo
- Anil Gayan
- Maneesh Gobin
- Hurrylall Goburdhun
- Ramchundur Goburdhun
- Dharam Gokhool
- Ameenah Gurib-Fakim
- Maya Hanoomanjee
- Sudhir Hazareesingh
- Mahesh Jadu
- Kher Jagatsingh
- Kailesh Jagutpal
- Anerood Jugnauth
- Lall Jugnauth
- Pravind Jugnauth
- Hazel Keech
- Mahadeosingh 'Visham' Komalram ("Swami Vishwananda")
- Vishnu Lutchmeenaraidoo
- Misha Mansoor
- Abdool Razack Mohamed
- Shakeel Mohamed
- Yousuf Mohamed
- Prem Nababsing
- William Newton
- Ananda Devi Nirsimloo-Anenden
- Raman Osman
- Renganaden Padayachy
- Armoogum Parsooraman
- Shenaz Patel
- Razack Peeroo
- Ariranga Govindasamy Pillay
- Bikramsingh Ramlallah
- Navin Ramgoolam
- Seewoosagur Ramgoolam
- Lutchmeeparsadsing Ramsahok
- Veerasamy Ringadoo
- Prithvirajsing Roopun
- Kailash Ruhee
- Renganaden Seeneevassen
- Rama Sithanen
- Prisca Thevenot
- Vijaya Teelock
- Harry Krishnan Tirvengadum
- Khal Torabully
- Cassam Uteem
- Dev Virahsawmy

== See also ==
- Ravived
- India–Mauritius relations
- Indian diaspora in Africa
- Indian diaspora in Southeast Africa
- Religion in Mauritius
- Hinduism in Mauritius
- Islam in Mauritius
- Christianity in Mauritius
- Mauritian Creole
- Mauritians of African origin
- Mauritians of Chinese origin
- Mauritians of French origin

== Notes and references ==
=== Notations ===
- Mauritius: History, Geography, Government, and Culture Archived 2024-07-13 at the Wayback Machine
- South Asian Indentured Labor - Online Archive of Research and Resources Archived 2019-12-24 at the Wayback Machine - an online archive and living syllabus of text-based resources related to Indian indentureship, with country-specific resources related to Indians indentured to Mauritius
