= Bihari Mauritians =

Calcuttiyas

Total population
- A majority (85%) of Indo-Mauritians

Regions with significant populations
- Majority in 7 out of 10 districts (Pamplemousses, Rivière du Rempart, Plaines Wilhems, Flacq, Moka, Grand Port & Savanne)

Languages
- Mauritian Creole, Mauritian Bhojpuri, Hindustani (Hindi-Urdu), French and English

Religion
- Predominantly: Hinduism; Minority: Islam · Christianity

Related ethnic groups
- Bhojpuri people · Biharis · Bihari-U.P. diaspora · Indian diaspora · Indo-Mauritians · Indo-Seychellois · Indo-South Africans · Indo-Surinamese · Indo-Guyanese · Indo-Trinidadians · Indo-Jamaicans · Indo-Fijians

Bihari Mauritians are descendants of predominantly Bhojpuri and Awadhi-speaking migrants from Bihar and Eastern Uttar Pradesh of India who moved to Mauritius. A majority of Indo-Mauritians, of which they are a subgroup of, are of Bihari origin, and most Mauritians are Indo-Mauritians. Caste-wise, many Bihari Mauritians are Vaishyas, with notable groups including Bhumihars, Brahmins, Rajputs, Koeris, Chamars, Yadavs, Kurmis, Banias, and Kayasthas. Except for one, all Mauritian Prime Ministers have been of Bihari Vaishya descent.

Bihari Mauritians primarily originated from the Bhojpur, Gaya, Chhapra (Saran), Gopalganj, East Champaran and West Champaran districts of Bhojpuri region in Bihar. During the early period of migration, the indentured labourers referred to Mauritius as "Marich". Amitav Ghosh's novel, Sea of Poppies, is set in this era and depicts the plight of impoverished Bihari migrants who undertook journeys to Mauritius and other distant colonies of the British Empire.

== Notable people ==
- Seewoosagur Ramgoolam
- Navin Ramgoolam
- Anerood Jugnauth
- Pravind Jugnauth
- Lall Jugnauth
- Kailesh Jagutpal
- Bhinod Bacha
- Heeralall Bhugaloo
- Basdeo Bissoondoyal
- Sookdeo Bissoondoyal
- Nando Bodha
- Harish Boodhoo
- Satcam Boolell
- Arvin Boolell
- Anil Gayan
- Hurrylall Goburdhun
- Ramchundur Goburdhun
- Vasant Bunwaree
- Kailash Ruhee
- Kailash Purryag
- Kishore Deerpalsing
- Lutchmeeparsadsing Ramsahok
- Dayendranath Burrenchobay
- Sheila Bappoo
- Maya Hanoomanjee
- Prithvirajsing Roopun
- Vijaya Teelock
- Ameenah Gurib-Fakim

== Social stratification ==
Though the island is divided on ethnic and religious grounds, Hindu Mauritians follow a number of original custom and tradition, quite different from those seen in the Indian subcontinent. The Indian Brahminical caste structure is based on the varna system, which categorizes society into four main groups: Brahmins, Kshatriyas, Vaishyas, and Shudras. Within this system, Brahmins (referred to as Maraz), Kshatriyas (referred to as Babujee), and Vaishyas (referred to as Vaish) are classified as high castes. These groups correspond to the Hindu concept of dvija, or "twice-born." In some contexts, Vaishyas may also be considered intermediary castes. The low castes are classified as Shudras and Dalits (outside the varna system), the latter referred to in Mauritius as Ravived. This classification can pertain to individuals, neighborhoods, or religious shrines.
