= 1983 Mauritian general election =

← 1982	21 August 1983	1987 →

All 62 directly elected seats in the Legislative Assembly (and up to 8 BLS seats)
- Turnout: 85.19% (▼3.65 pp)
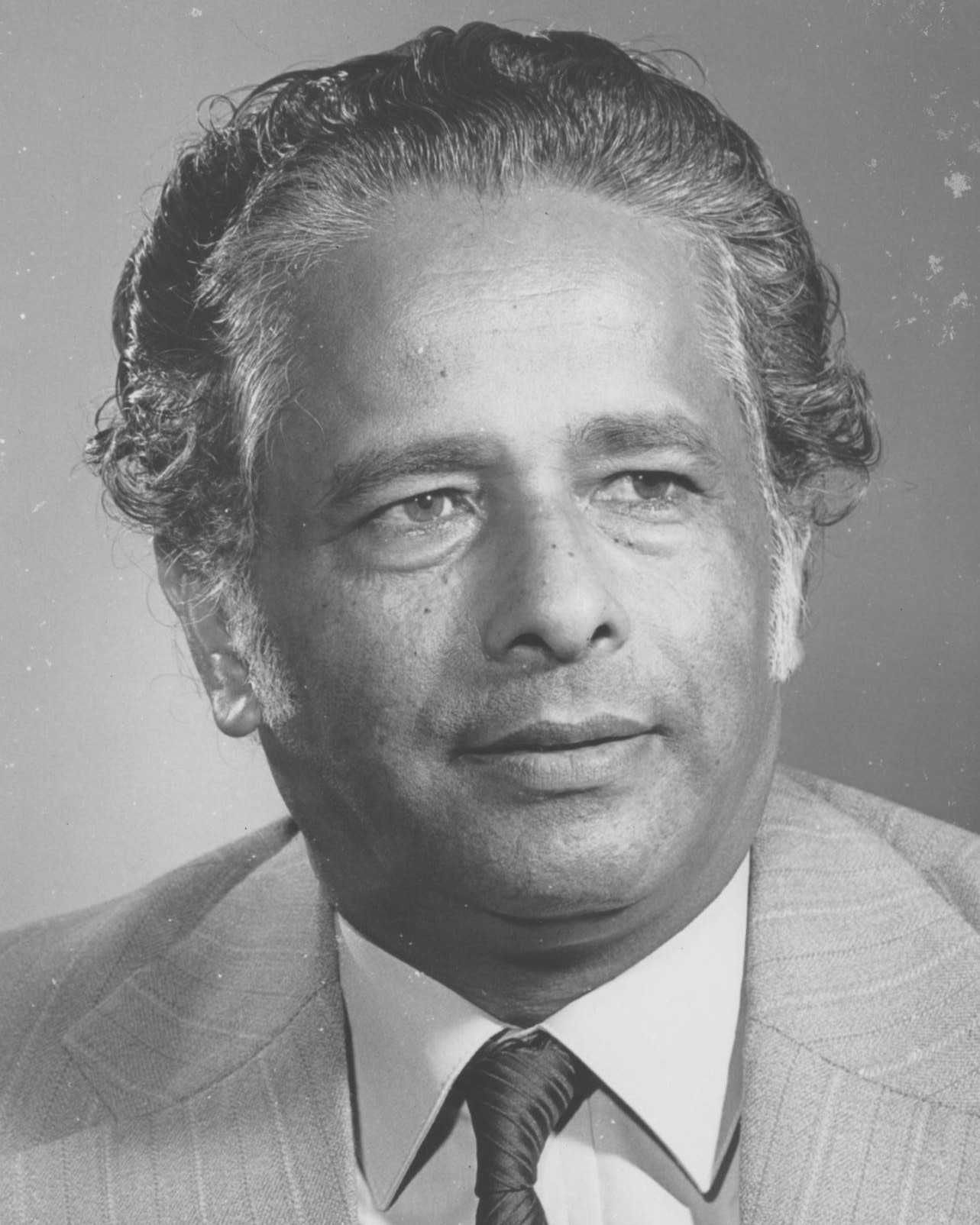

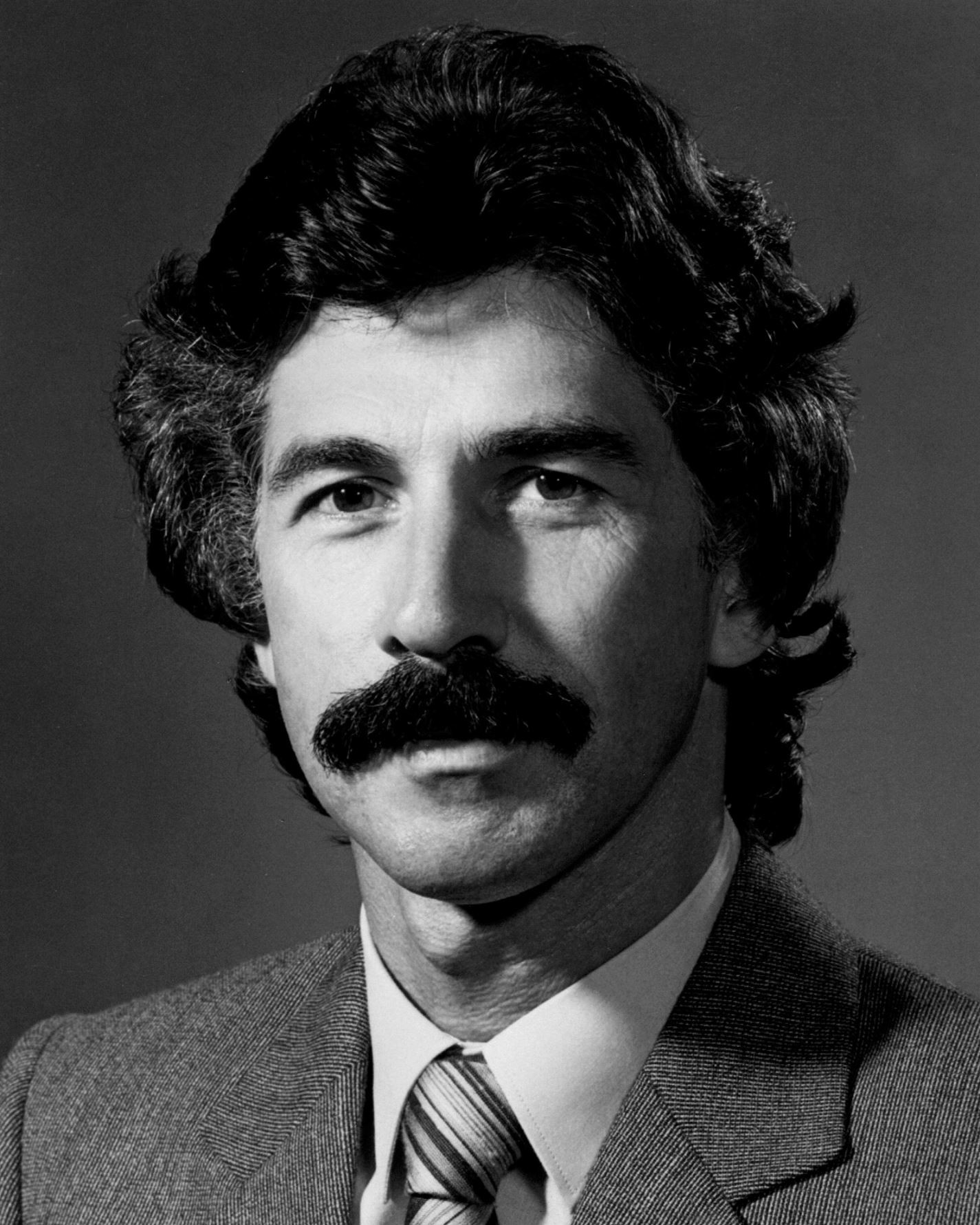
	First party	Second party
Leader	Anerood Jugnauth	Paul Bérenger
Party	MSM	MMM
Alliance	MSM–PTr–PMSD	–
Seats won	31	22
Seat change	New	▼20
Popular vote	437,785	629,528
Percentage	31.70%	45.58%
Alliance seats	46
Popular vote	716,860
Alliance %	51.90%
- Alliance result by constituency. The colour shade shows the percentage of the elected candidate with the highest number of votes
Prime Minister before election
Anerood Jugnauth
MSM
Subsequent Prime Minister
Anerood Jugnauth
MSM

Early general elections were held in Mauritius on 21 August 1983. The result was a victory for an alliance of the Militant Socialist Movement (MSM), the Labour Party and the Parti Mauricien Social Démocrate (PMSD), which between them won 46 seats. The Militant Socialist Movement won 32 seats, whilst the Labour Party secured ten seats and the PMSD five. On the other hand, the Mauritian Militant Movement was relegated to 22 seats, down from 42 in the last election. Voter turnout was 85.19%.

The election was called by Anerood Jugnauth, who became prime minister after winning in a landslide in 1982, five months after the governing coalition split due to disagreements between finance minister Paul Bérenger and Jugnauth. The latter formed the MSM in April 1983 and saw the Parti Socialiste Mauricien merge with the new party. Jugnauth remained as prime minister only with a narrow majority and unable to maintain that majority, he decided to call for early elections barely a year after the last one was called.

Jugnauth's electoral alliance allowed him to remain prime minister whilst bringing Gaëtan Duval, who became deputy prime minister, and Seewoosagur Ramgoolam, who was appointed eventually as governor-general, back into the government after their severe defeat in the 1982 elections. Newly elected leader Satcam Boolell became the country's foreign minister.

The Mauritian Militant Movement suffered after the departure of Jugnauth and the split of the MMM-PSM alliance. Bérenger, the party's leader, was not popularly elected in his own constituency. However, under the Best Loser System, he secured his seat through the representational system. He was appointed afterwards as Leader of the Opposition, a post he held until 1987.

== Electoral system ==
The Legislative Assembly has 62 directly elected members; 60 represent 20 three-seat constituencies, and two are elected from a constituency on the island of Rodrigues. The elections are held using the plurality block vote system with panachage, whereby voters have as many votes as seats available. In what is commonly known as the Best Loser System, should a community fail to win parliamentary representation, the Electoral Supervisory Commission can appoint up to eight unsuccessful candidates from these communities with the most votes. The Electoral Commission divides the electorate into four communities: Hindus, Muslims, Sino-Mauritians and the general population; the latter comprises voters who do not belong to the first three. Unless the Governor-General dissolves the Legislative Assembly early, members serve a five-year term.

== Parties and candidates ==
Following the internal divisions of the Mauritian Militant Movement (MMM) between the factions of Jugnauth and Bérenger, the former's faction split and formed the Militant Socialist Movement (MSM) on 8 April 1983, with members of the other governing party, Parti Socialiste Mauricien (PSM), joining and merging with the new party.

The MSM eventually formed an electoral alliance with the Labour Party led by Seewoosagur Ramgoolam. The alliance appeared on the ballot as MSM/Travailliste. The two parties also closely cooperated with Gaëtan Duval's Parti Mauricien Social Démocrate (PMSD), with the alliance not deciding to field any candidates in constituencies where PMSD candidates stood. The PMSD stood in constituencies of Grand River North West-Port-Louis West, Curepipe-Midlands, Stanley-Rose Hill, Beau Bassin-Petite Rivière and Rodrigues. The MSM–PTr–PMSD alliance ran in all 21 constituencies.

As for the MMM, the party decided to run on its own without forming an alliance and contested in all mainland constituencies.

Major alliance/party	Member parties	Alliance leader	Candidates
MSM–PTr–PMSD	Militant Socialist Movement	Anerood Jugnauth	35
MSM–PTr–PMSD	Labour Party	Anerood Jugnauth	13
MSM–PTr–PMSD	Parti Mauricien Social Démocrate	Anerood Jugnauth	14
Mauritian Militant Movement		Paul Bérenger	60

== Results ==
Party or alliance		Votes	%	Seats			
Party or alliance		Votes	%	Cons	BL	Total	+/–
Mauritian Militant Movement		629,528	45.58	19	3	22	–20
MSM–PTr	Militant Socialist Movement	437,785	31.70	28	3	31	New
MSM–PTr	Labour Party	138,211	10.01	9	1	10	+8
MSM–PTr	Total	575,996	41.70	37	4	41	+39
Parti Mauricien Social Démocrate		140,864	10.20	4	1	5	+3
Rodrigues People's Organisation		15,981	1.16	2	0	2	0
Lalit		3,116	0.23	0	0	0	New
Front Mauricien Independent		2,637	0.19	0	0	0	New
Parti Ouvrier Progressiste		2,143	0.16	0	0	0	New
Mouvement Democrate Mauricien		1,036	0.08	0	0	0	New
Groupement Mauricien		735	0.05	0	0	0	New
Communist Party of Mauritius		704	0.05	0	0	0	New
Mouvement Liberal Mauricien		572	0.04	0	0	0	0
Groupement Progressiste		426	0.03	0	0	0	New
Parti du Peuple Mauricien		358	0.03	0	0	0	New
Groupement Socialiste du Sud		241	0.02	0	0	0	New
Mauritian Muslim Rights		156	0.01	0	0	0	New
Independents		6,658	0.48	0	0	0	0
Total		1,381,151	100.00	62	8	70	+4
Valid votes		464,465	98.82				
Invalid/blank votes		5,543	1.18				
Total votes		470,008	100.00				
Registered voters/turnout		551,708	85.19				
Source: OEC, OEC, Nohlen et al., Alliance candidate affiliations:

=== By constituency ===
Constituency		Elected MPs	Party
1	Grand River North West– Port Louis West	Mathieu Laclé	MMM
1	Grand River North West– Port Louis West	Jérôme Boulle	MMM
1	Grand River North West– Port Louis West	Rajnee Dyalah	MMM
2	Port Louis South– Port Louis Central	Noël Lee Cheong Lem	MMM
2	Port Louis South– Port Louis Central	Khalid Tegally	MMM
2	Port Louis South– Port Louis Central	Subhas Chandra Lallah	MMM
2	Port Louis South– Port Louis Central	Kamil Ramoly (best loser)	PTr
3	Port Louis Maritime– Port Louis East	Bashir Khodabux	MMM
3	Port Louis Maritime– Port Louis East	Osman Gendoo	MMM
3	Port Louis Maritime– Port Louis East	Cassam Uteem	MMM
3	Port Louis Maritime– Port Louis East	Ismaël Nawoor (best loser)	MSM
4	Port Louis North– Montagne Longue	Shree Krisna Baligadoo	MMM
4	Port Louis North– Montagne Longue	José Arunasalom	MMM
4	Port Louis North– Montagne Longue	Dinesh Mundil	MMM
4	Port Louis North– Montagne Longue	Sylvio Michel (best loser)	MSM
4	Port Louis North– Montagne Longue	Georgy Candahoo (best loser)	MSM
5	Pamplemousses–Triolet	Beergoonath Ghurburrun	PTr
5	Pamplemousses–Triolet	Diwakur Bundhun	MSM
5	Pamplemousses–Triolet	Dinesh Ramjuttun	MSM
6	Grand Baie–Poudre D'Or	Armoogum Parsooraman	MSM
6	Grand Baie–Poudre D'Or	Sattyanand Pelladoah	PTr
6	Grand Baie–Poudre D'Or	Madan Dulloo	MSM
7	Piton–Riviere du Rempart	Dwarkanath Gungah	MSM
7	Piton–Riviere du Rempart	Anerood Jugnauth	MSM
7	Piton–Riviere du Rempart	Mahyendrah Utchanah	MSM
8	Quartier Militaire–Moka	Kadress Pillay	MSM
8	Quartier Militaire–Moka	Vinod Goodoory	MSM
8	Quartier Militaire–Moka	Rashidally Soobadar	MSM
9	Flacq–Bon Accueil	Dev Kim Currun	PTr
9	Flacq–Bon Accueil	Ajay Daby	MSM
9	Flacq–Bon Accueil	Iswardeo Seetaram	PTr
10	Montagne Blanche– Grand River South East	Satcam Boolell	PTr
10	Montagne Blanche– Grand River South East	Kader Bhayat	MSM
10	Montagne Blanche– Grand River South East	Jagdishwar Goburdhun	MSM
11	Vieux Grand Port–Rose Belle	Anandisswar Choolun	MSM
11	Vieux Grand Port–Rose Belle	Nemchand Raj Molaye	MSM
11	Vieux Grand Port–Rose Belle	Radha Gungoosingh	MSM
12	Mahebourg–Plaine Magnien	Lutchmeeparsadsing Ramsahok	MSM
12	Mahebourg–Plaine Magnien	Serge Thomas	PTr
12	Mahebourg–Plaine Magnien	Suresh Chandra Poonith	MSM
13	Riviere des Anguilles–Souillac	Vishnu Lutchmeenaraidoo	MSM
13	Riviere des Anguilles–Souillac	Amba Chinien	PTr
13	Riviere des Anguilles–Souillac	Harish Boodhoo	MSM
14	Savanne–Black River	Sheilabai Bappoo	MSM
14	Savanne–Black River	Kishore Deerpalsing	MSM
14	Savanne–Black River	Roger Gaëtan Gungurum	MSM
15	La Caverne–Phoenix	Uttam Jawaheer	MMM
15	La Caverne–Phoenix	Sahid Maudarbocus	MMM
15	La Caverne–Phoenix	Yousuf Mohamed	PTr
16	Vacoas–Floreal	Karl Offmann	MSM
16	Vacoas–Floreal	Babooram Mahadoo	MSM
16	Vacoas–Floreal	Rohit Beedassy	MSM
16	Vacoas–Floreal	France Canabady (best loser)	MMM
17	Curepipe–Midlands	Gaëtan Duval	PMSD
17	Curepipe–Midlands	Marc Hein	PMSD
17	Curepipe–Midlands	Kailash Purryag	PMSD
18	Belle Rose–Quatre Bornes	Michael Glover	PTr
18	Belle Rose–Quatre Bornes	Anil Gayan	MSM
18	Belle Rose–Quatre Bornes	Dev Virahsawmy	MSM
18	Belle Rose–Quatre Bornes	Paul Bérenger (best loser)	MMM
19	Stanley–Rose Hill	Jayen Cuttaree	MMM
19	Stanley–Rose Hill	Jean-Claude de l'Estrac	MMM
19	Stanley–Rose Hill	Shirin Aumeeruddy-Cziffra	MMM
20	Beau Bassin–Petite Riviere	Jean Régis Finette	MMM
20	Beau Bassin–Petite Riviere	Hervé Duval	PMSD
20	Beau Bassin–Petite Riviere	Rajesh Bhagwan	MMM
20	Beau Bassin–Petite Riviere	Joceline Minerve (best loser)	MMM
20	Beau Bassin–Petite Riviere	Marie Ghiselaine Henry (best loser)	PMSD
21	Rodrigues	France Félicité	OPR
21	Rodrigues	Serge Clair	OPR
Source: Electoral Commission
