= 1982 Mauritian general election =

- 11 June 1982

All 62 directly elected seats in the Legislative Assembly (and up to 8 BLS seats)
- Turnout: 88.84% (▼1.16 pp)
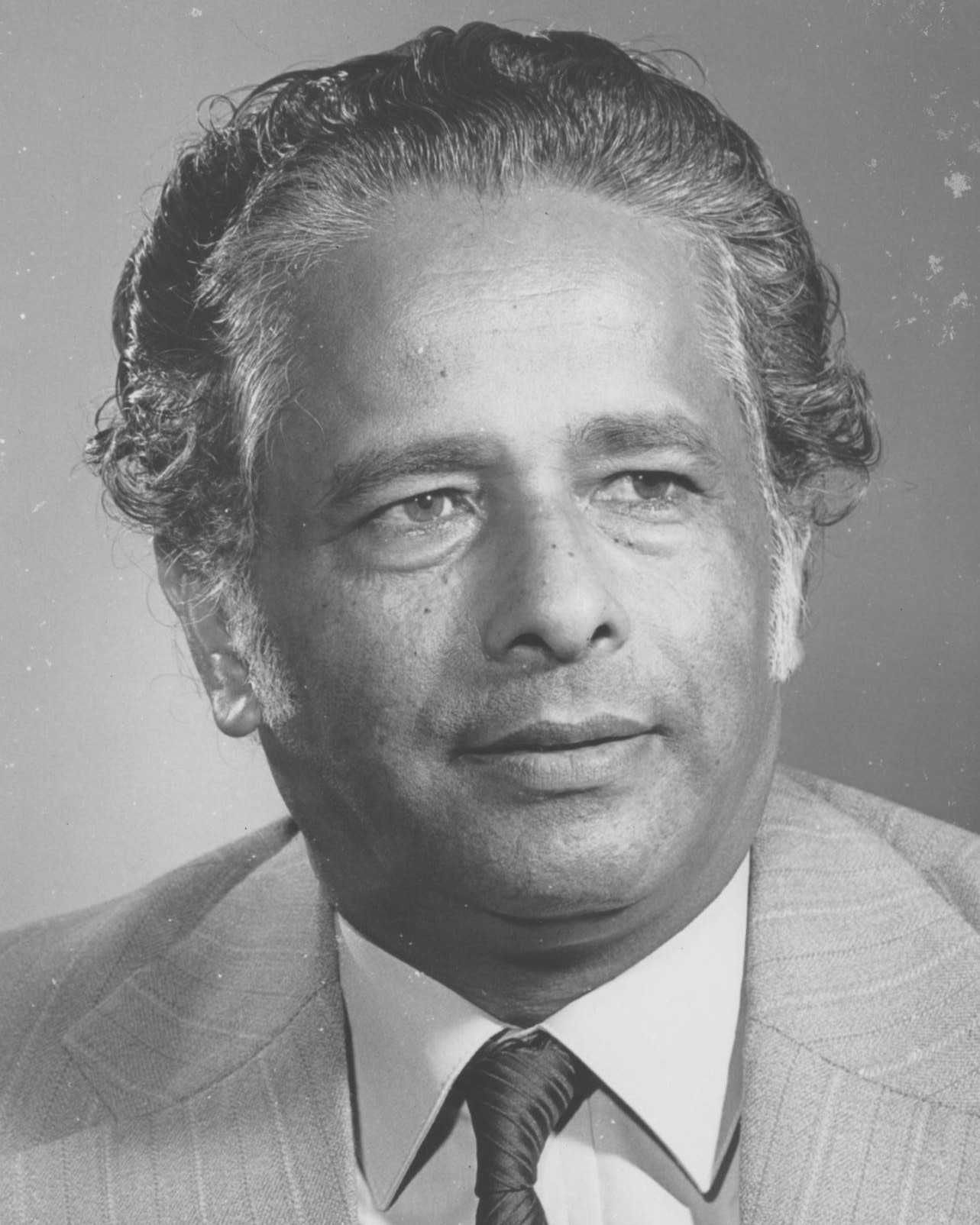

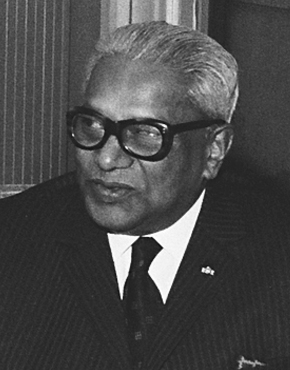

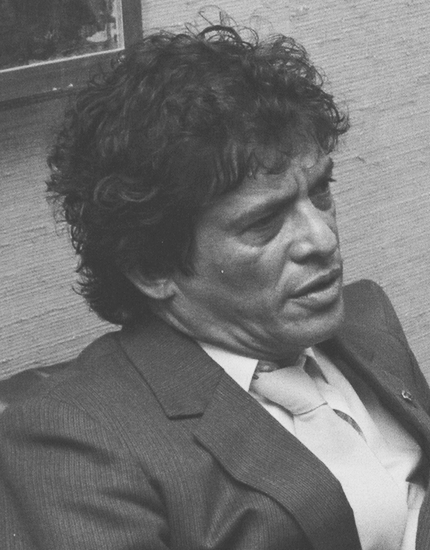
	First party	Second party	Third party
Leader	Anerood Jugnauth	Seewoosagur Ramgoolam	Gaëtan Duval
Party	MMM	Labour	PMSD
Alliance	MMM–PSM	PAN
Last election	38.69%, 34 seats	28 seats (IP)	16.53%, 8 seats
Seats won	42	2	2
Seat change	▲8	▼26	▼6
Popular vote	621,059	309,882	120,214
Percentage	43.16%	21.54%	8.36%
Alliance seats	60	2	2
Popular vote	906,800	363,519	120,214
Alliance %	63.02%	25.27%	8.36%
- Alliance result by constituency. The colour shade shows the percentage of the elected candidate with the highest number of votes
Prime Minister before election
Seewoosagur Ramgoolam
Labour
Subsequent Prime Minister
Anerood Jugnauth
MMM

General elections were held in Mauritius on 11 June 1982. The election resulted in a landslide victory for the Mauritian Militant Movement–Mauritian Socialist Party alliance, which won all 60 of the directly elected mainland seats. Anerood Jugnauth became prime minister for the first time, replacing Seewoosagur Ramgoolam who had governed the country since its independence.

Ramgoolam had formed a coalition government in the aftermath of the previous election, composing of the Labour Party and the Parti Mauricien Social Démocrate, led by Gaëtan Duval. After several scandals that the government faced during its term, including economic mismanagement and postponement of elections, the government was defeated in a landslide, winning only a total of four best loser seats in the Legislative Assembly and none of its candidates were elected in any constituency.

The voting system involved twenty constituencies on Mauritius, which each elected three members. Two seats were elected by residents of Rodrigues, and up to eight seats were filled by the best losers system, although following this election, only four best loser seats were awarded. Voter turnout was 88.84%.

This election would be the first of three elections in which a party or an alliance received a 60-0 result, winning all of the elected mainland constituencies in Mauritius.

Ramgoolam received funding from the CIA during the election.

== Background ==
In the aftermath of the previous election, the Mauritian Militant Movement (MMM) became the largest party in the Legislative Assembly, garnering a total of 34 seats, just two seats shy of the majority. The Labour Party (PTr), under the alliance of the Independence Party (IP) along with the Muslim Committee of Action (CAM), led by Seewoosagur Ramgoolam, came in second with 28 seats and lost its majority in the assembly. In order to prevent fears of the country being ruled under an MMM government, Ramgoolam formed a coalition government with the Parti Mauricien Social Démocrate (PMSD), led by Gaëtan Duval, bringing the coalition total to 36 seats, enough to form a one-seat majority government.

However, the coalition government faced several scandals during its term, which included economic mismanagement that resulted in the first devaluation of the rupee and the removal of subsidies on essential items which was imposed by the International Monetary Fund. In addition, relations with the opposition and the government were shaky and led to heated exchanges. With the thin-wafer majority that the government had in the assembly, it could not afford to loose on any votes. Intra-party relations, especially within the Labour Party, became fractious, with Harish Boodhoo and other Labour MPs constantly voting against the government.

Anerood Jugnauth, MMM leader and Leader of the Opposition, tabled a vote of no confidence against the government on 4 December 1979 due to the performance of the government and the scandals it was facing. The government narrowly won the vote, with Boodhoo's group saving the government's lifespan. One MMM MP defected to support the government for the vote.

== Election date ==
Ramgoolam advised the Governor-General, Dayendranath Burrenchobay, to dissolve parliament on 18 December 1981, a few days before the automatic dissolution of the body. However, the writs for the election were not issued immediately. Under the Representation of People Ordinance of 1958, as amended in 1976, the Governor-General must issue the writs for the election within 55 days after the dissolution of parliament, and setting the dates for candidacy filling and when the election will be held.

The writs for the election were issued on 15 February 1982 by the Governor-General, two months after the dissolution of the parliament and scheduling the election on 11 June.

== Electoral system ==
The Legislative Assembly has 62 directly elected members; 60 represent 20 three-seat constituencies, and two are elected from a constituency on the island of Rodrigues. The elections are held using the plurality block vote system with panachage, whereby voters have as many votes as seats available. In what is commonly known as the Best Loser System, should a community fail to win parliamentary representation, the Electoral Supervisory Commission can appoint up to eight unsuccessful candidates from these communities with the most votes. The Electoral Commission divides the electorate into four communities: Hindus, Muslims, Sino-Mauritians and the general population; the latter comprises voters who do not belong to the first three. Unless the Governor-General dissolves the Legislative Assembly early, members serve a five-year term.

== Parties and candidates ==
A total of 360 candidates representing 22 parties contested the election. The deadline for the submission and registration of candidates to the Electoral Supervisory Commission were on 19 April 1982, with the list being finalised on 21 April.

Countering the government, the Mauritian Militant Movement and Parti Socialiste Mauricien, a dissident party from the Labour Party formed by Harish Boodhoo, formed an alliance in early 1981. The MMM-PSM alliance fielded a total of 60 candidates for all the mainland constituencies, with the MMM being allocated 42 candidates and the PSM with 18 candidates. Of the 42 MMM candidates, 26 were incumbent members of the Legislative Assembly, whilst three of the 18 PSM candidates were Labour MPs who defected to the party (Boodhoo, Radha Gungoosingh and Rohit Beedassy).

For the Parti de l'Alliance Nationale, led by Seewoosagur Ramgoolam, the alliance was composed of the Labour Party and two other groups or parties that were primarily dissidents of the Parti Mauricien Social Démocrate: the Group Éliziér François and the Rassemblement pour le Progrès et la Liberté (RPL), led by Philo Blackburn. Other dissidents of the PMSD participated under the Labour banner. The Muslim Committee of Action did not contest for this election under the alliance but three dissidents of the party joined under the Labour banner and participated in the constituency of Port Louis Maritime–Port Louis East. The alliance finalised its candidate list on 15 April, which was criticised since it was still being reworked until the last minute.

As for the PMSD, led by Gaëtan Duval, it still participated in all of the 60 constituencies although some candidates, like Duval himself, contested in several other constituencies as well.

Major alliance	Member parties	Alliance leader	Candidates
Parti de l'Alliance Nationale	Labour Party	Seewoosagur Ramgoolam	51
Parti de l'Alliance Nationale	Rassemblement pour le Progrès et la Liberté	Seewoosagur Ramgoolam	5
Parti de l'Alliance Nationale	Group Éliziér François	Seewoosagur Ramgoolam	4
MMM–PSM	Mauritian Militant Movement	Anerood Jugnauth	42
MMM–PSM	Parti Socialiste Mauricien	Anerood Jugnauth	18

== Results ==
The MMM–PSM alliance won all of the 60 elected mainland constituencies, of which 42 were taken by the MMM and 18 by the PSM. The MMM managed to win an outright majority in itself as a party, marking the first time that a party managed to do so. This is also the first time that a party or alliance managed to win all of the elected mainland constituencies. The Parti de l'Alliance Nationale did not win any of the elected constituencies, as did the Parti Mauricien Social Démocrate. In Rodrigues, the Rodrigues People's Organisation won both of the island's two constituency seats, gaining representation for the first time.

Four best loser seats were allocated in this election, out of the maximum eight seats that can be allocated. The Labour Party and the PMSD were given two seats each in order to balance the ethnic representation in the assembly.

Voter turnout was at 88.84%, a slight decrease of 1.16 pp from the previous election.

Party or alliance		Votes	%	Seats			
Party or alliance		Votes	%	Cons	BL	Total	+/–
MMM–PSM	Mauritian Militant Movement	621,059	43.16	42	0	42	+6
MMM–PSM	Parti Socialiste Mauricien	285,741	19.86	18	0	18	New
MMM–PSM	Total	906,800	63.02	60	0	60	+26
Parti de l'Alliance Nationale	Labour Party	309,882	21.54	0	2	2	–26
Parti de l'Alliance Nationale	Rassemblement pour le Progrès et la Liberté	28,533	1.98	0	0	0	New
Parti de l'Alliance Nationale	Group Éliziér François	25,104	1.74	0	0	0	New
Parti de l'Alliance Nationale	Total	363,519	25.27	0	2	2	–26
Parti Mauricien Social Démocrate		120,214	8.36	0	2	2	–6
Rodrigues People's Organisation		16,129	1.12	2	0	2	+2
Parti Islamique Mauricien		9,334	0.65	0	0	0	New
Union Démocratique Mauricienne		1,558	0.11	0	0	0	0
Front Liberation National		1,325	0.09	0	0	0	New
Mauritius National Party		1,285	0.09	0	0	0	New
Mouvement Liberal du Nord		910	0.06	0	0	0	New
Mauritius Young Labour Movement		523	0.04	0	0	0	New
Parti du Centre Republicain		454	0.03	0	0	0	0
Independent Democratic Movement		334	0.02	0	0	0	New
Zenes Socialiste		265	0.02	0	0	0	New
Mouvement Radical Mauricien		255	0.02	0	0	0	New
Organisation du Peuple Mauricien		189	0.01	0	0	0	New
Tamil Fraternity of Mauritius–Hindu Progressive Movement		118	0.01	0	0	0	New
Mauritian Socialist Congress		115	0.01	0	0	0	New
Dhravediennes United Party		96	0.01	0	0	0	New
Independents		15,393	1.07	0	0	0	0
Total		1,438,816	100.00	62	4	66	–4
Valid votes		483,810	98.62				
Invalid/blank votes		6,769	1.38				
Total votes		490,579	100.00				
Registered voters/turnout		552,204	88.84				
Source: OEC, OEC, Le Mauricien, Nohlen et al.; Alliance candidate affiliations:

=== By constituency ===
Constituency		MP	Party	Notes
1	Grand River North West– Port Louis West	Mathieu Laclé	MMM	Elected
1	Grand River North West– Port Louis West	Jérôme Boulle	MMM	Reelected
1	Grand River North West– Port Louis West	Rajnee Dyalah	MMM	Reelected
2	Port Louis South– Port Louis Central	Kader Bhayat	MMM	Reelected
2	Port Louis South– Port Louis Central	Vijay Padaruth	PSM	Elected
2	Port Louis South– Port Louis Central	Noël Lee Cheong Lem	MMM	Reelected
3	Port Louis Maritime– Port Louis East	Osman Gendoo	MMM	Reelected
3	Port Louis Maritime– Port Louis East	Cassam Uteem	MMM	Reelected
3	Port Louis Maritime– Port Louis East	Bashir Khodabux	MMM	Reelected
4	Port Louis North– Montagne Longue	Shree Krisna Baligadoo	MMM	Reelected
4	Port Louis North– Montagne Longue	Jankeeparsad Nundalalee	PSM	Elected
4	Port Louis North– Montagne Longue	Sylvio Michel	MMM	Reelected
5	Pamplemousses–Triolet	Dinesh Ramjuttun	PSM	Elected
5	Pamplemousses–Triolet	Prem Koonjoo	MMM	Elected
5	Pamplemousses–Triolet	Diwakur Bundhun	MMM	Elected
6	Grand Baie–Poudre D'Or	Madan Dulloo	MMM	Reelected
6	Grand Baie–Poudre D'Or	Dharmanand Fokeer	MMM	Reelected
6	Grand Baie–Poudre D'Or	Armoogum Parsuramen	PSM	Elected
7	Piton–Riviere du Rempart	Anerood Jugnauth	MMM	Reelected
7	Piton–Riviere du Rempart	Dharam Gokhool	MMM	Elected
7	Piton–Riviere du Rempart	Mahen Utchanah	MMM	Elected
8	Quartier Militaire–Moka	Vinod Goodoory	PSM	Elected
8	Quartier Militaire–Moka	Rama Poonoosamy	MMM	Elected
8	Quartier Militaire–Moka	Rashidally Soobadar	PSM	Elected
9	Flacq–Bon Accueil	Ajay Daby	PSM	Elected
9	Flacq–Bon Accueil	Ravindranath Lochun	MMM	Elected
9	Flacq–Bon Accueil	Dwarkanath Gungah	MMM	Reelected
10	Montagne Blanche– Grand River South East	Jagdishwar Goburdhun	MMM	Reelected
10	Montagne Blanche– Grand River South East	Ramduth Jaddoo	MMM	Reelected
10	Montagne Blanche– Grand River South East	Azize Asgarally	MMM	Reelected
11	Vieux Grand Port–Rose Belle	Radha Gungoosingh	PSM	Reelected
11	Vieux Grand Port–Rose Belle	Anandisswar Choolun	PSM	Elected
11	Vieux Grand Port–Rose Belle	Raj Molaye	MMM	Elected
12	Mahebourg–Plaine Magnien	Lutchmeeparsadsing Ramsahok	MMM	Reelected
12	Mahebourg–Plaine Magnien	Suresh Chandra Poonith	MMM	Reelected
12	Mahebourg–Plaine Magnien	Jocelyn Seenyen	PSM	Elected
13	Riviere des Anguilles–Souillac	Harish Boodhoo	PSM	Reelected
13	Riviere des Anguilles–Souillac	Vishnu Lutchmeenaraidoo	MMM	Elected
13	Riviere des Anguilles–Souillac	Swalay Kasenally	MMM	Reelected
14	Savanne–Black River	Alan Ganoo	MMM	Elected
14	Savanne–Black River	Kishore Deerpalsing	PSM	Elected
14	Savanne–Black River	Arianne Navarre-Marie	MMM	Elected
15	La Caverne–Phoenix	Uttam Jawaheer	PSM	Elected
15	La Caverne–Phoenix	Satteeanund Peerthum	MMM	Elected
15	La Caverne–Phoenix	Sahid Maudarbocus	MMM	Elected
15	La Caverne–Phoenix	France Roussety	PTr	Best Loser
16	Vacoas–Floreal	Rohit Beedassy	PSM	Reelected
16	Vacoas–Floreal	France Canabady	MMM	Elected
16	Vacoas–Floreal	Babooram Mahadoo	PSM	Elected
17	Curepipe–Midlands	Anil Gayan	MMM	Elected
17	Curepipe–Midlands	Louis Percy La France	MMM	Elected
17	Curepipe–Midlands	Karl Offmann	PSM	Elected
18	Belle Rose–Quatre Bornes	Paul Bérenger	MMM	Reelected
18	Belle Rose–Quatre Bornes	Kailash Ruhee	PSM	Elected
18	Belle Rose–Quatre Bornes	Devanand Rottoo	MMM	Elected
18	Belle Rose–Quatre Bornes	Michael Glover	PTr	Best Loser
19	Stanley–Rose Hill	Jayen Cuttaree	MMM	Elected
19	Stanley–Rose Hill	Jean-Claude de l'Estrac	MMM	Reelected
19	Stanley–Rose Hill	Shirin Aumeeruddy-Cziffra	MMM	Reelected
20	Beau Bassin–Petite Riviere	Régis Finette	MMM	Elected
20	Beau Bassin–Petite Riviere	Subash Ramdahen	PSM	Elected
20	Beau Bassin–Petite Riviere	Finlay Salesse	MMM	Reelected
21	Rodrigues	France Félicité	OPR	Elected
21	Rodrigues	Serge Clair	OPR	Elected
21	Rodrigues	Gaëtan Duval	PMSD	Best Loser
21	Rodrigues	Nicol François	PMSD	Best Loser; Reelected
Source: OEC, (candidate affiliations)

== Aftermath ==
Following the decisive victory of the new alliance, the leaders of the alliance made televised statements calling for national unity. Anerood Jugnauth promised that he would be a 'prime minister for all Mauritians' whilst Harish Boodhoo outlined that change within the country would be 'done gently'. Paul Bérenger announced that the government planned to make general elections mandatory every five years, preventing the postponement of elections which Seewoosagur Ramgoolam had done in the past.

On his part, Ramgoolam accepted defeat and the verdict of the elections and denied plans that he planned to move out of Mauritius. He chaired his final cabinet meeting on 14 June and met with the Governor-General, Dayendranath Burrenchobay, the following day.

Jugnauth was sworn in along with his ministers on 15 June at State House in Port-Louis in front of the Governor-General. The new government also included the Rodrigues People's Organisation (OPR), which entered the government for the first time. The cabinet was composed of a total of 20 ministers, with the MMM having 14 ministers, the PSM with five and the OPR receiving one minister. Serge Clair, the new minister for Rodrigues from the OPR, was separately sworn in on 16 June. A thanksgiving rally was held a week later in the Champ de Mars.
