= Indian diaspora in Southeast Africa =

Ethnic community

Regions with significant populations
- South Africa: 1,699,795
- Mauritius: 894,595
- Réunion: 220,895
- Kenya: 101,250
- Mozambique: 70,870
- Tanzania: 60,000
- Uganda: 39,500
- Madagascar: 25,000
- Zambia: 12,500
- Seychelles: 10,000
- Zimbabwe: 9,500
- Botswana: 8,750
- Malawi: 8,500
- Lesotho: 4,000
- Rwanda: 3,300
- Eswatini: 1,100

Languages
- Colonial Languages: English; French; Portuguese; Indian Languages: Mauritian Bhojpuri; Tamil; Hindi-Urdu; Gujarati; Memoni; Sindhi; Kutchi-Swahili; Kutchi; Bhojpuri-Awadhi; Marathi; Telugu; Bengali; Odia; Other Languages of India; Local Languages: Afrikaans; Mauritian Creole; Bemba language; Réunion Creole; Seychellois Creole; Malagasy; Sena; Swahili; Chichewa language

Religion
- Majority: Hinduism; Islam; Catholicism; Protestantism; Minority: Sikhism; Zoroastrianism; Jainism

Related ethnic groups
- Non-Resident Indians and people of Indian origin

The Indian diaspora in Southeast Africa comprises an estimated three million or more people of Indian descent. Indian migration to the region dates back centuries, with early migrants arriving by sea as merchants and traders. The Swahili coast served as a major center of early commercial and cultural interactions between the Indian subcontinent and East Africa. Indian migration to Africa increased substantially during the period of European colonial rule in the 19th and 20th centuries. Following the formal abolition of slavery, European colonial authorities transported Indian indentured labourers to colonies in Africa and other parts of the world. Under British colonial rule, large numbers of Indians were brought to work in South Africa, while others were brought to Kenya and Uganda, many to construct the Kenya–Uganda Railway. Both British and French colonial authorities also brought Indians to work in the islands of Mauritius, Seychelles, and Réunion.

Labourers endured harsh and often dangerous living and working conditions, with many recruited through deceptive or coercive practices. Disease, workplace accidents, malnutrition, and overwork contributed to mortality, while physical abuse and suicides were also documented. Some railway workers also faced fatal attacks by wild animals. Some labourers also faced dangerous sea voyages characterised by disease and inadequate sanitation. Other Indians migrated voluntarily, establishing trading communities throughout the region, including in Madagascar, Zanzibar, German East Africa (present-day Tanzania, Rwanda, and Burundi), and Portuguese Mozambique. Many also served as commercial intermediaries and administrative officials under colonial governments.

People of Indian descent participated in anti-colonial and independence movements across the region, as well as anti-apartheid movements in South Africa. Following decolonisation, Indian-origin communities continued to play influential roles in the region's economy and politics.

== Sub-groups ==
=== Indian Ocean islands ===
- Indians in Madagascar (Madagascan Muslims)
- Indo-Mauritians (Bihari & Tamil Mauritians)
- Réunionnais of Indian origin (Malbars & Zarabes)
- Indo-Seychellois (Tamil Seychellois)

=== Mainland Southeast Africa ===
- Indian South Africans
- Indians in Kenya
- Indians in Mozambique
- Indians in Tanzania
- Indians in Uganda
- Indians in Zambia
- Indians in Botswana
- Indians in Zimbabwe
- Indians in Malawi
- Indians in Lesotho
- Indians in Rwanda
- Indians in Eswatini

== History ==
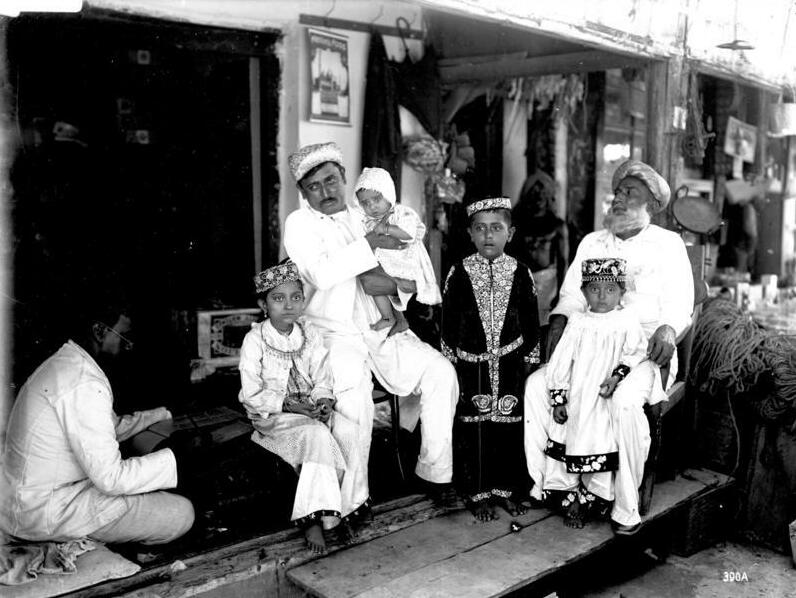
Indian trader's family in Bagamoyo, German East Africa, around 1900s.

Indian trade activities and settlements in Southeast Africa may date back to the late 1st millennium CE. Muhammad al-Idrisi, an Arab geographer, records Indian settlements at Sofala (now present-day Mozambique) in the 12th century.

During the late 19th and early 20th centuries, European colonial expansion greatly expanded and reshaped Indian migration to Southeast Africa. In British East Africa, Indian traders, clerks and artisans settled in the East Africa Protectorate, later the Kenya Colony, while tens of thousands of indentured labourers from British India were recruited to work on the Uganda Railway and in the Uganda Protectorate. Indian migration also expanded in Zanzibar and Tanganyika under European colonial rule, while Indian communities developed in Portuguese-ruled Mozambique and other European colonial territories.

Following the passage of the 1833 Slavery Abolition Act, the Indian indenture system developed to replace slave labour in British and other European colonies. The system, inaugurated in 1834 in Mauritius, involved the use of licensed agents after the abolition of slavery. These agents imported indentured Indian labour to replace the freed slaves. The indentured were legally supposed to receive either minimal wages or some small form of payout (such as a small parcel of land, or the money for their return passage) upon completion of their indentures. Employers did not have the right to buy or sell indentured laborers as they did slaves. However, the conditions faced by the indentured laborers were frequently abysmal.

Foundation stone laying ceremony of the Sikh Gurdwara in Nairobi, Kenya, c. late 1930s

Of the original 32,000 contracted laborers, after the end of indentured service about 6,700 stayed on to work as dukawallas, (Note: Shopkeepers: from the Swahili "duka" – meaning shop, and the Hindi "walla" – meaning person in charge of something) artisans, traders, clerks, and, finally, lower-level administrators. Colonial personnel practices excluded them from the middle and senior ranks of the colonial government and from farming; instead they became commercial middlemen and professionals, including doctors and lawyers.

It was the dukawalla, not European settlers, who first moved into new colonial areas. Even before the dukawallas, Indian traders had followed the Arab trading routes inland on the coast of modern-day Kenya and Tanzania. Indians had a virtual lock on Zanzibar's lucrative trade in the 19th century, working as the Sultan's exclusive agents.

Between the building of the railways and the end of World War II, the number of Indians in Southeast Africa swelled to 320,000. By the 1940s, some colonial areas had already passed laws restricting the flow of immigrants, as did white-ruled Rhodesia in 1924. But by then, the Indians had firmly established control of commercial trade—some 80 to 90 percent in Kenya and Uganda was in the hands of Indians—plus some industrial activities. In 1948, all but 12 of Uganda's 195 cotton ginneries were Indian run. Banknotes of the East African shilling had values written in Gujarati as well as English and Arabic.

Many Parsis settled in Zanzibar to work as merchants and civil servants for the colonial government. They formed one of the largest Parsi communities outside of India, a community that survived until the Zanzibar Revolution of 1964. Indians in Zanzibar founded the one locally owned bank in all of the African Great Lakes, Jetha Lila, which closed after the Revolution when its customer base left.

South Asian communities faced political and economic discrimination in some states after independence. This contributed to substantial emigration from countries such as Kenya and Tanzania and culminated in the expulsion of most of Uganda's South Asian population by President Idi Amin in 1972. In Zanzibar, South Asians were among the groups affected by violence, deportations and property confiscations during and after the 1964 revolution. The Asian population subsequently declined significantly through emigration. In South Africa, Indians faced extensive legal and racial discrimination under colonial rule and later under apartheid, including restrictions on residence, movement, political participation and economic activity.

== Expulsion from Uganda and repatriation ==
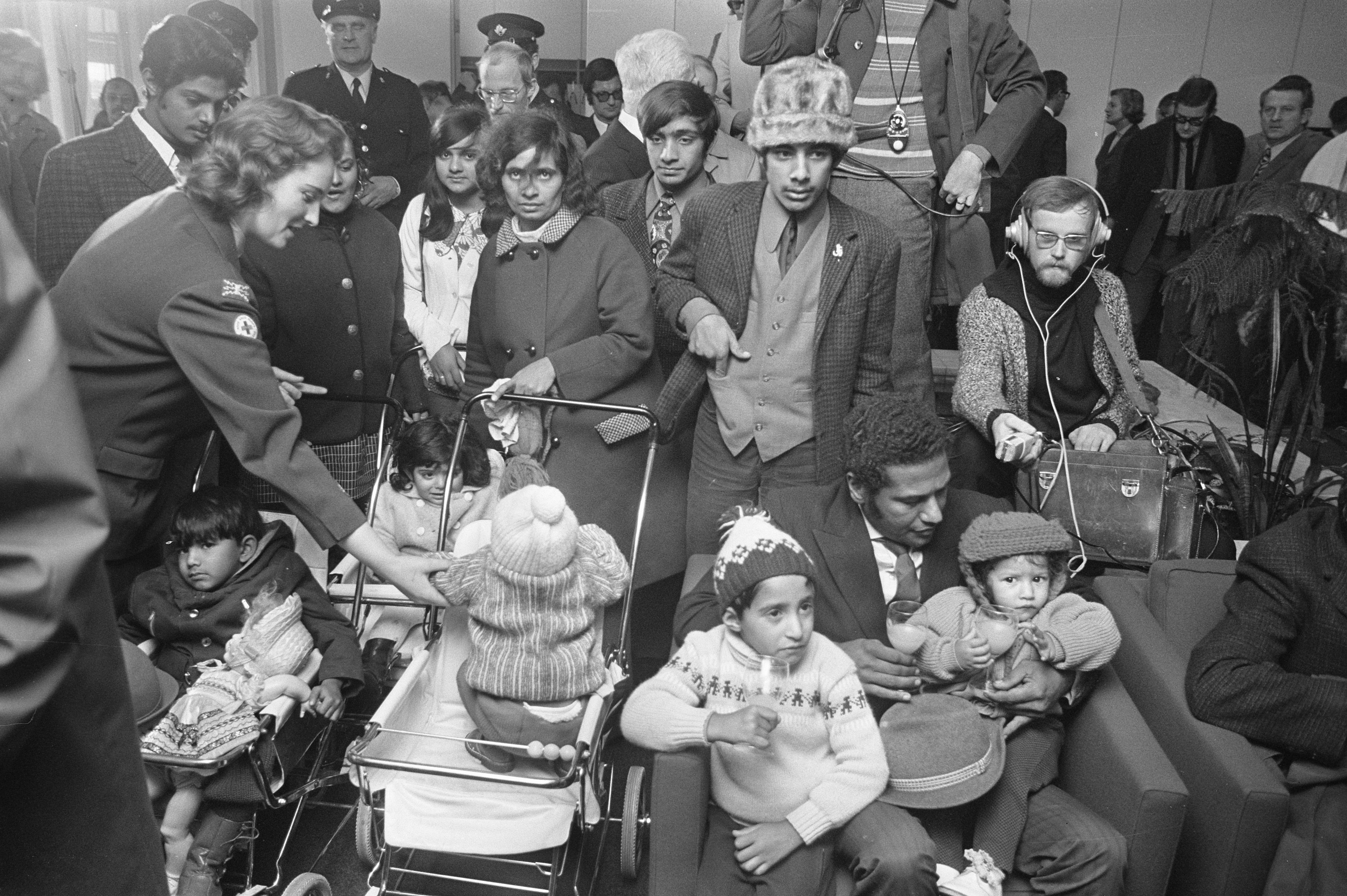
Indians expelled from Uganda arriving at Amsterdam Airport Schiphol, November 1972

In 1972, Idi Amin gave the nearly 80,000 Ugandans of Asian (mainly Indians) descent 90 days to leave the country, so an expulsion was set in effect. Many of them held citizenship and passports of the UK and colonies rather than of Uganda. 23,000 had successfully gained citizenship and several thousand more had pending applications but these were all cancelled by Amin immediately prior to the expulsion. These descendants of the Dukawallas and Indian coolies then comprised about 2 percent of the population. Their businesses and property were "Africanized" and given to native Ugandans.

Some 27,000 Ugandan Indians moved to Britain, another 6,100 to Canada, 1,100 to the United States, while the rest scattered to other Asian and European countries.

Today, however, many of these same ethnic Indians have returned. The Indian Diaspora has contributed to the political arena, blurring the binary "homeland" and "hostland" dynamic. They have adopted a distinctive political identity, shaped by anti-colonial efforts in both India and Southeast Africa. In 1992, under pressure from aid donors and Western governments, Ugandan President Yoweri Museveni simplified a then 10-year-old law letting Asians reacquire lost property.

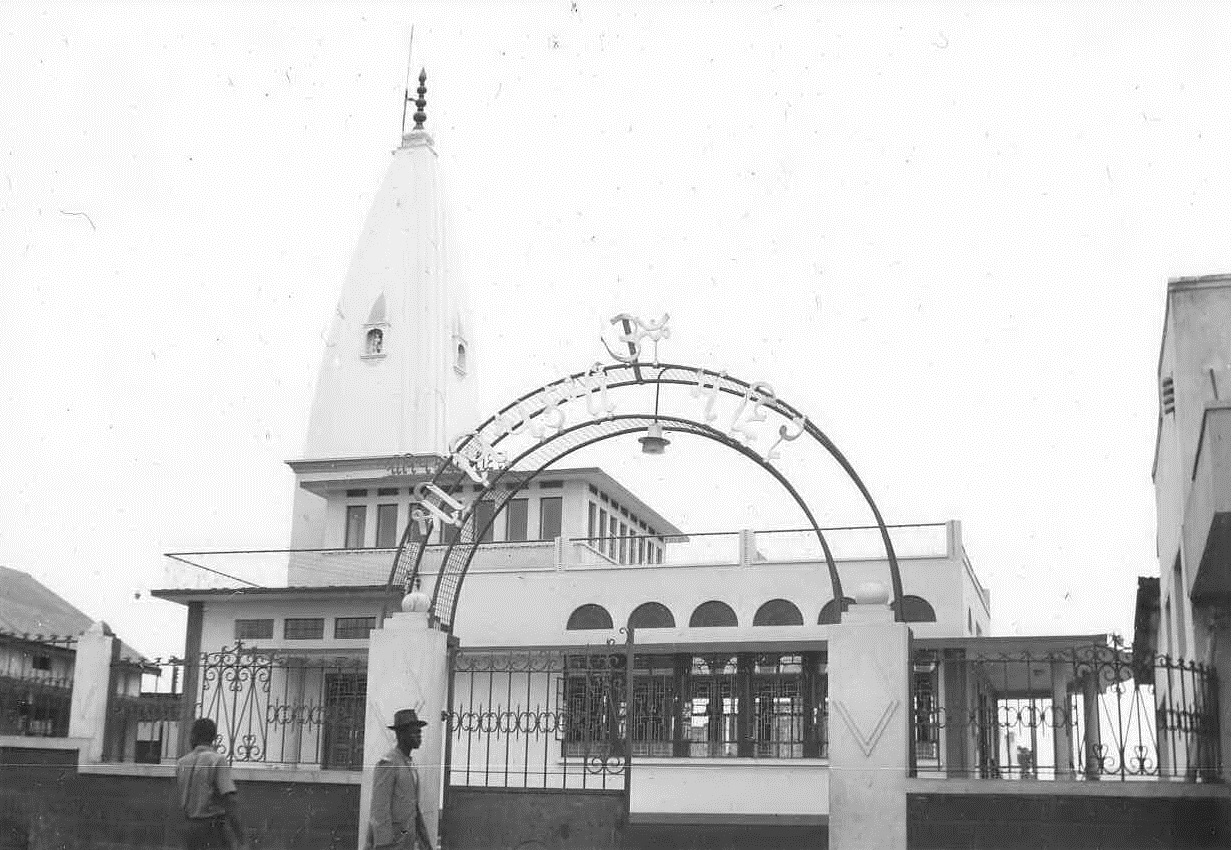
A Hindu temple in Jinja, Uganda

Sikh and Hindu temples are found in the urban Southeast African urban landscape, as do mosques, particularly those built by the large Ismaili Muslim community, which immigrated from Gujarat. Some extended families—the backbone of the Indian ethnic group—are prospering under Uganda's new openness. Two families, the Mehtas and Madhvanis, have built multimillion-dollar empires in Uganda since the 1980s.

Still, the Indian communities remain concerned about their position in Southeast Africa. Continued fighting in western Uganda between hundreds of rebels and troops in June 2000, and politically motivated ethnic violence in Mombasa that claimed more than 40 lives in August 2000, gave credence to these concerns. Around 15,000–25,000 Indians currently live in Uganda.

== Cultural depictions ==
The lives of the Wahindi (Swahili for "Indians") were first fictionalized for a Western mass audience in V. S. Naipaul's A Bend in the River. The Trinidadian West Indies author's 1979 book remains the best-known literary work in English addressing the Indian experience in East and Central Africa. Though recently A Bend in the River enjoyed a resurgence of critical acclaim for its dead-on portrayal of post-colonial African life in the former Zaire (renamed the Democratic Republic of Congo), the novel also lifted the curtain on an ethnic group who had become central to Southeast Africa's life in the later half of the 20th century.

The experience is touched upon in the films Mississippi Masala, Touch of Pink, Bend It Like Beckham, The Last King of Scotland and Bohemian Rhapsody.

Books written on the socio-cultural and economic climate and realities experienced by the Indian diaspora, particularly the Nizari Ismailis include The Book of Secrets and The Gunny Sack, by M. G. Vassanji, himself a Nizari Ismaili.

== See also ==
- Asian Africans
- Coolies
- Non-Resident Indians and Overseas Citizens of India
