= Bihari diaspora =

People from Bihar who reside outside of India

Bihari-U.P. diaspora
Languages
- Bhojpuri, Awadhi, Maithili, Angika, Magahi, Bajjika, Hindustani, English; Caribbean English and Caribbean Hindustani (in Caribbean); Fiji Hindi, Pidgin Fijian and Fijian English (in Fiji); South African English, Afrikaans and Bhojpuri (Naitali) (in South Africa); French, English, Mauritian Creole and Mauritian Bhojpuri (in Mauritius); Seychellois Creole, French and English (in Seychelles)

Religion
- Predominantly: Hinduism 80% Minority: Islam 17%, Buddhism 3%

Related ethnic groups
- Indian diaspora, Nepali diaspora, Bengali diaspora, Odia diaspora and Assamese diaspora

Bihari-U.P. diaspora are Bihari and Uttar Pradeshi people hailing from the Indian states of Bihar and Uttar Pradesh who reside outside of India. They are of different ethnolinguistic groups including Bhojpuri, Awadhi, Maithil and Magahi.

== Pakistan and Bangladesh ==
During the partition of India in 1947, many Bihari Muslims moved to both West Pakistan and East Pakistan, where they were counted among other Muhajirs and still are in present-day Pakistan. About one million Bihari Urdu-speakers moved to East Pakistan from Bihar in eastern India.

When East Pakistan became the independent state of Bangladesh in December 1971 after the Bangladesh Liberation War, 83,000 Biharis (58,000 former civil servants and military personnel) wanting to leave being ethnic Urdu-speakers, members of divided families and 25,000 hardship cases were evacuated to Pakistan. By 1974, 108,000 had been transferred to Pakistan (mainly by air); by 1981, about 163,000. The remaining Biharis of East Bengal were left behind and found themselves unwelcomed in both countries. Pakistan did not wish to accept the Biharis left in the newly formed Bangladesh as it saw itself a struggling to manage thousands of Afghan refugees at that time, while Bangladeshis scorned the ethnic Biharis for having supported and sided with the West Pakistan during the war and preferring their native Urdu over the Bengali language movement.

With little or no legal negotiation about offering the Biharis Pakistani citizenship or safe conduit back home to their native Bihar in India, many Biharis, called "stranded Pakistanis", have remained stateless for years. The United Nations High Commissioner for Refugees (UNHCR) has not addressed the plight of the Biharis. An estimated 600,000 Biharis live in 66 camps in 13 regions across Bangladesh, and an equal number have acquired Bangladeshi citizenship. In 1990, a small number of Biharis were allowed to immigrate to Pakistan.

Pakistan has reiterated that as the successor state of East Pakistan, Bangladesh should accept the Biharis as full citizens. Pakistani politicians and government officials have refused to accept these nearly 300,000 stranded Pakistanis of Bihari origin due to inability to absorb such a large number of immigrants.

In May 2008, Bangladesh High Court ruled that Biharis who were either minors in 1971 or born after 1971 are Bangladeshi citizens and have the right to vote. As a result of the ruling, an estimated 150,000 of the 300,000 Biharis living in Bangladesh are eligible for Bangladeshi citizenship. Although the court ruling explicitly said that the Biharis are eligible to register to vote in the December 2008 elections, the Election Commission closed its rolls in August 2008 without enrolling them.

== Caribbean, Fiji, Mauritius, Myanmar, South Africa and Seychelles ==
A large number of people from the Bhojpuri speaking regions of Bihar Province and United Provinces of British India travelled to various parts of the world in the 19th century to serve as indentured labours on sugarcane, cocoa, rice, and rubber plantations in the Caribbean, Fiji, Mauritius, Myanmar, Seychelles and Natal, South Africa.

A majority of Indo-Mauritians are Bihari Mauritians, so are a proportion of Indo-Seychellois (third largest, since South Indians and Gujaratis form a majority of the country's ethnic Indians) as well as a portion of Indian South Africans (fourth largest subgroup in the country after Gujaratis, Tamils and Telugus). Most of the Mauritian Prime Ministers or Presidents were Indo-Mauritians of Bihari descent hailing from the Bhojpur-Purvanchal regions of Bihar and Uttar Pradesh states in India. Many Indo-Caribbeans are also of Bhojpuri or Awadhi descent hailing from the Purvanchal and Awadh regions of Uttar Pradesh.
