= Kailash Ruhee =

Mauritian politician

The Right Honourable Keerteecoomar (Kailash) Ruhee MP
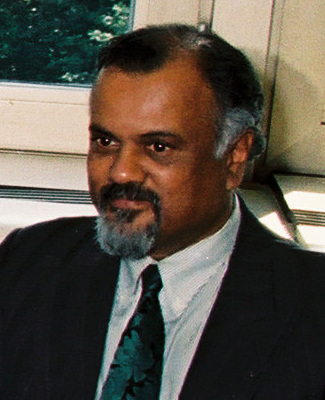
- Ruhee in 1995

Elected member for Constituency No.18
- In office June 1982 – August 1983
- Prime Minister: Anerood Jugnauth

Elected member for Constituency No.16
- In office August 1987 – September 1991
- Prime Minister: Anerood Jugnauth

Elected member for Constituency No.18
- In office September 1991 – December 1995
- Prime Minister: Anerood Jugnauth

Ambassador in the USA
- In office 2006–2009
- Prime Minister: Navin Ramgoolam

Personal details
- Born: British Mauritius
- Party: PSM; MMM; MSM; Labour Party
- Education: Bâton-Rouge, Louisiana, USA

Keerteecoomar Ruhee, more commonly known as Kailash Ruhee is a Mauritian politician.

== Education & career ==
Kailash Ruhee graduated in agricultural engineering from a university in Bâton-Rouge, Louisiana. Upon his return to Mauritius he worked as a lecturer at the newly formed University of Mauritius. In early 1982 he was one of the nine academics from that institution who stood as candidates at the general elections of 11 June 1982.

== Political career ==
In 1979 Kailash Ruhee was one of the founding members of the PSM, along with Harish Boodhoo, Armoogum Parsooraman, Yousouf Maudarbocus, and Ashok Roy. They were nicknamed "the five rare birds" by Harish Boodhoo at PSM's first rally meeting which was held in July 1979 at Belle-Rose markets.

At the June 1982 general elections Kailash Ruhee was a candidate of Boodhoo's PSM within the MMM-PSM coalition in Constituency No. 18. Other candidates of this coalition who also previously worked as lecturers at the University of Mauritius were Swalay Kasenally, Régis Finette, Kishore Deerpalsing, and Dharam Ghokool. Given the 60-0 landslide victory of the MMM-PSM coalition against the Labour Party-PMSD regime, Kailash Ruhee was elected along with Paul Bérenger and Devanand Routho in Constituency No. 18. He became a minister in the ruling government of Jugnauth and Boodhoo. However, on 22 March 1983 Ruhee formed part of the 11 out of 18 inexperienced ministers who resigned from the MMM-MSM government, blaming PSM's Deputy Prime Minister Harish Boodhoo for exerting undue influence over Prime Minister Anerood Jugnauth. Kailash Ruhee and Jocelyn Seenyen were 2 of the 5 PSM ministers of the Jugnauth-Boodhoo government who defected to join Paul Bérenger's MMM.

At the 21 August 1983 general elections Kailash Ruhee stood once again as a candidate of the MMM in Constituency No. 18 but was defeated by Michael Glover, Anil Gayan and Raj Virah-sawmy of the MSM-Labour coalition.

At the 30 August 1987 general elections the MMM-MTD-FTS coalition presented Kailash Ruhee as one of its three candidates in Constituency No. 16 (Vacoas Floréal) and he was elected to the Legislative Assembly.

At the 15 September 1991 general elections Kailash Ruhee was presented, along with Rama Sithanen and Michael Glover, as candidates of the MSM-MMM coalition in Constituency No. 18 (Belle Rose & Quatre Bornes), all three men were elected to the Legislative Assembly, and they were all appointed as ministers of the ruling government. In August 1993 Anerood Jugnauth revoked Paul Bérenger from the MSM-MMM government, and by October 1993 two rival factions formed within the MMM, one led by Prem Nababsing and the other by Paul Bérenger as the latter was becoming too close to the Labour Party. On 26 June 1994 Prem Nababsing launched a new party Renouveau Militant Mauricien (RMM) during a public rally held in Rose Hill. Kailash Ruhee, was among several ex-MMM ministers and politicians (such as Jean-Claude de l’Estrac, Swaley Kasenally, Dharmanand Fokeer, Prem Koonjoo, Mathieu Laclé, Jérome Boulle, Noel Lee Cheong Lem, Bashir Khodabux, Osman Gendoo, Dharam Gokhool, and Amédée Darga) who also vouched their full support to Prem Nababsing and newly-formed RMM.

However, Kailash Ruhee did not contest the 20 December 1995 general elections which resulted in the victory of a coalition made up of 5 parties PTR–PMXD–VF–MR–MMSM.

In January 2006 Kailash Ruhee was appointed by Navin Ramgoolam as Chief of Staff and Senior Adviser at the Prime Minister's Office. His main role was to reform the civil service.

By October 2006 Kailash Ruhee was nominated by the government as Ambassador to the USA, replacing Usha Jeetah who had also been defeated as candidate of the MMM-MSM coalition at the 2005 general elections. He served in this role until late 2009 after which he returned to Mauritius to work as advisor at the Prime Minister's Office.
