= Maya Hanoomanjee =

Mauritian politician and diplomat

Maya Hanoomanjee GCSK
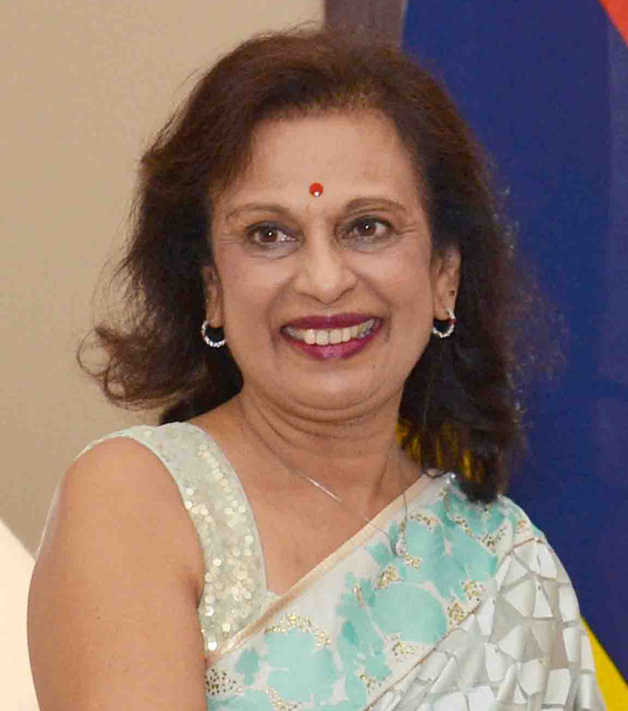
- Hanoomanjee in 2018

Ambassador of Mauritius to Nepal
- In office 2 March 2022 – 6 September 2022

High Commissioner of Mauritius to India
- In office 21 May 2020 – 6 September 2022
- Preceded by: Jagdishwar Goburdhun
- Succeeded by: Haymandoyal Dillum

Speaker of the National Assembly
- In office 22 December 2014 – 21 November 2019
- Deputy: Adrien Duval; Sanjeev Teeluckdharry; Bobby Hurreeram; Joe Lesjongard
- Preceded by: Razack Peeroo
- Succeeded by: Sooroojdev Phokeer

Minister of Health and Quality of Life
- In office 11 May 2010 – 26 July 2011
- Prime Minister: Navin Ramgoolam
- Preceded by: Rajesh Jeetah

Member of Parliament; for Savanne and Rivière Noire
- In office 12 May 2005 – 6 October 2014
- Preceded by: Prithvirajsing Roopun
- Succeeded by: Joe Lesjongard

Personal details
- Born: 5 October 1952 (age 73) Mauritius
- Party: Militant Socialist Movement

Santi Bai Hanoomanjee GCSK (née Ghose; born 5 October 1952), commonly known as Maya Hanoomanjee, is a Mauritian politician and diplomat who served as speaker of the National Assembly of Mauritius from December 2014 to November 2019.

Hanoomanjee is a former civil servant and retired in 2005 as a Permanent Secretary before officially joining the Militant Socialist Movement and becoming elected as an MP. She served as the Permanent Secretary for Finance and Health in that time. She was appointed as minister of Health and Quality of Life in May 2010 in the coalition government of Navin Ramgoolam, until she resigned in July 2011 following her involvement in the MedPoint affair.

Following her defeat in her constituency in 2014, she was chosen and elected as the first female speaker of the National Assembly. After her time in the office, Hanoomanjee was appointed as the high commissioner of Mauritius to India in May 2020, but she resigned in September 2022 after the death of her son-in-law. She also held the position of Non Resident Ambassador of Mauritius in Nepal from March 2022 until September 2022.

== Early life ==
Hanoomanjee was born in the Ghose family related to the Ballah family. She is the first cousin of Sarojini Ballah and sister-in-law of Anerood Jugnauth. She is also the first cousin once removed of the current prime minister Pravind Jugnauth. She had her primary education in Aryan Vedic School in Vacoas, secondary education at Queen Elizabeth College, Rose Hill and completed her degree at University of Mauritius.

She was a civil servant from 1971 to 2005 and retired as a Permanent Secretary in May 2005. During her tenure as a civil servant, she served as the Chairperson of the Tea Board from 1996 to 2004, Chairperson of the Farmers Service Commission from 1998 to 2004, Chairperson of the Sugar Planter's Mechanical Pool Corporation from 1997 to 2004, Chairperson of the Mauritius Sugar Authority - 2001 to May 2005 and was the first Chairperson of the Mauritius Revenue Authority from 2004 to May 2005.

She was also a board member in various committees. In the same capacity, she represented Mauritius in discussions at ACP-EU level in Sugar Protocol issues, lobbying missions in EU countries regarding Sugar Protocol, negotiations at WTO regarding trade issues and part of several international summits and conferences.

== Political career ==
In 2005, when she was 53 years of age, she retired from the Civil Service in order to join the Militant Socialist Movement (MSM), a party led by her cousin Sarojini Ballah's husband. At the 2005 and 2010 General Elections she was elected in Constituency No. 14 Black River & La Savanne. She became Minister of Health from 11 May 2010 until the coalition government of Mauritian Labour Party & Militant Socialist Movement broke in July 2011 due to the Medpoint Scandal. She served in Navin Ramgoolam's cabinet during her tenure as a minister. She served as an opposition member till 6 October 2014.

At the 2014 General Elections, as a candidate of Alliance Lepep, she was defeated in Constituency 14 Savanne–Rivière Noire by Alan Ganoo (MMM), Joe Lesjongard (MMM), and Ezra Jhuboo (Ptr). But the victorious MSM-PMSD-MPM-ML-PM coalition appointed Hanoomanjee as the Speaker, thus becoming the first woman to hold this constitutional office, and she was also the 2nd highest ranked female in the republic after President Ameenah Gurib. She was also elected President of the Commonwealth Parliamentary Association (Africa Region) on 14 August 2015 in Kenya, Nairobi at the 46th CPA (Africa Region) Conference.

== Controversies ==
=== 1986 Amsterdam Boys ===
In 1986 it was revealed that Maya Hanoomanjee, then Permanent Secretary, had issued diplomatic passports on a weekend to allow four members of Parliament to travel to Amsterdam where they were arrested with 25 kg of the drug heroin in their suitcase. This became known as the Amsterdam Boys scandal which was also linked to the 1989 arrest of High Commissioner of Mauritius (for UK, Vatican and West Germany) Soo Soobiah and his wife Muriel.

=== 2011 Medpoint scandal ===
In 2011 the Finance Minister Pravind Jugnauth and Health Minister Hanoomanjee were accused of using public funds to buy the Medpoint Clinic which was owned by Pravind Jugnauth's sister and brother-in-law. All three of them denied the allegation. She was arrested on 22 July 2011 by the Anti-Corruption Commission (ICAC) on charges of incurring losses to the State to the tune of 144 million Rupees by approving to buy a family owned clinic to be made a government geriatric clinic. Six ministers from MSM party resigned from the cabinet condemning the arrest of Hanoomanjee. On 11 April 2013, the Director of Public Prosecutions, considered equivalent to the prosecutor relieved her on account of non-availability of corroborating evidence against her.

=== 2015 Daughter's appointment at SPDC ===
Hanoomanjee's daughter Naila Hanoomanjee was appointed as the chief executive officer of the State Property Development Company Ltd (SPDC), manager of the Port Louis Waterfront and the Mahébourg Waterfront during October 2015. There were allegations that laws were bent to accommodate her, while Hanoomanjee refuted the claims stating that her daughter underwent multiple selection procedures and was chosen on merit.

=== 2017 Biscuitgate scandal ===
Maya Hanoomanjee was subjected to a vote of no confidence when she was Speaker as Rum and Sugar Ltd, a company headed by her daughter Sheila, had been awarded contracts to supply tinned biscuits to state-owned organisations, including the Municipality of Quatre Bornes. Following investigations these products were removed from shelves as they were fraudulently labelled 'Made in UK' when in reality they were locally baked in Mauritius. They were also marked up by 3300% and they used a fake packaging address. Roshi Bhadain described the Mafia involving the Speaker, her daughter Sheila, the CEO of Mauritius Duty Free Paradise, the mayor of Quatre Bornes Atmaram Sonoo, and minister Sudhir Sesungkur, who all lied to cover up the scandal.

== Recognition ==
On 12 March 2015 the MSM-PMSD-ML government of her nephew Pravind Jugnauth awarded her the title Grand Commander Of The Order Of The Star And Key Of The Indian Ocean (GCSK) for her political, social and public service.

- Mauritius:
  - Grand Commander of the Order of the Star and Key of the Indian Ocean (2024)
