= Anund Neewoor =

Anund Priyay Neewoor (born 26 June 1940) is a Mauritian diplomat. As of the year 2006, he has served as Foreign Secretary.

On 10 September 1993 he was appointed Mauritian Ambassador to the United States where he was accredited from 1 October 1993 till 29 July 1996. He has been a member of the Labour Party (Mauritius) and following the end of his tenure as Mauritian Ambassador to the United States, it was Chitmansing Jesseramsing who assumed this position.
