= Speaker of the National Assembly of Mauritius =

Presiding officer of the National Assembly of Mauritius

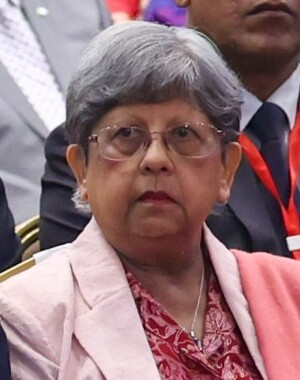
- Incumbent; Shirin Aumeeruddy-Cziffra since 29 November 2024
- National Assembly of Mauritius
- Style: The Honourable
- Type: Presiding officer
- Appointer: National Assembly
- Formation: 1957 (Legislative Council)
- First holder: Sir Robert Stanley
- Deputy: Deputy Speaker
- Website: mauritiusassembly.govmu.org

The Speaker of the National Assembly is the presiding officer in the National Assembly of Mauritius. The speaker is elected by the members of the National Assembly and does not have to be a member of the National Assembly.

The position has existed since the Legislative Council, as it was known at the time in the 1950s, decided to choose a separate presiding officer for the Council (the Colonial Governor served as the presiding officer before). Sir Robert Stanley was chosen as the first speaker of the Legislative Council in 1957. Stanley was followed by Sir Harilal Vaghjee, who became the first Mauritian to hold the speakership in 1960. Vaghjee remains the longest-serving holder of the office.

Since the opening of the 8th National Assembly on 29 November 2024, Shirin Aumeeruddy-Cziffra is the incumbent speaker of the National Assembly. She is the second female speaker and the first female Muslim woman to serve within the role. Aumeeruddy-Cziffra was elected unanimously by the house.

== Election and term ==
Following a general election to elect the members of the National Assembly, the first business to be conducted after the swearing-in of members is the election of the Speaker and Deputy Speaker. Traditionally, candidates chosen to the speakership are agreed beforehand between the government and the opposition and thus, the candidate is elected unanimously. However, in the instance that more than one candidate is proposed and seconded, the election proceeds to secret ballot.

Under section 32 of the constitution, the Speaker may or may not be a member of the house itself. Before the amendment of the section in 1996, it was a requirement that the person chosen as a candidate for the position be a member of the house itself.

== Role ==
The Speaker is the main representative of the House and the main spokesperson to the President, who also composes the other part of the parliament. The authority of the parliament is symbolised by the holder of the speakership. They are expected to be impartial and above party politics as the Speaker swears their loyalty to the dignity of parliament.

As typical with other Westminster model of governance, the Speaker ensures that the rules and standing orders of the Assembly are followed and complied. They have the power to interpret and enforce such rulings in accordance to precedence, typically following Erskine May's Parliamentary Practice. Any ruling made by the Speaker may not be challenged, with exception to a substantive motion, and criticism made towards his actions outside of parliament may count as contempt to the Assembly.

During debates, the Speaker is responsible for setting the choice of speakers and admissibility of questions towards ministers when Question Time arises. They must ensure that government backbenchers and opposition members are allocated evenly in their questions. In addition, the Speaker is most importantly responsible for ensuring order and discipline during debates. They may call any member into order and if a member persists on being unruly, the Speaker may ask the member to withdraw from the chamber for the remainder of the day's sitting. If a member continues to flout the authority of the chair or willfully obstructs the business of the house, the Speaker has the power to name any member.

Under section 53 of the constitution, the Speaker, Deputy Speaker or any person presiding over the house, provided that they are members of the Aseembly itself, are not prevented from having a vote in any question posed to the Assembly. Thus, a speaker elected outside the membership of the assembly is only allowed to have a vote when a tie exists during a question posed to the house.

== List of speakers ==
Portrait	Name (birth–death)	Term of office			Party	Legislature	
Portrait	Name (birth–death)	Took office	Left office	Time in office	Party	Legislature	
	Sir Robert Stanley	26 February 1957	21 March 1960	3 years, 24 days	Independent	2nd	Legislative Council
	Sir Robert Stanley	26 February 1957	21 March 1960	3 years, 24 days	Independent	3rd	Legislative Council
	Sir Harilal Vaghjee (1912–1979)	22 March 1960	25 May 1979	19 years, 64 days	PTr	3rd	Legislative Council
	Sir Harilal Vaghjee (1912–1979)	22 March 1960	25 May 1979	19 years, 64 days	PTr	4th	Legislative Council
	Sir Harilal Vaghjee (1912–1979)	22 March 1960	25 May 1979	19 years, 64 days	PTr	5th	Legislative Council
	Sir Harilal Vaghjee (1912–1979)	22 March 1960	25 May 1979	19 years, 64 days	PTr	1st	Legislative Assembly
	Sir Harilal Vaghjee (1912–1979)	22 March 1960	25 May 1979	19 years, 64 days	PTr	2nd	Legislative Assembly
	Sir Ramesh Jeewoolall (1941–2019)	5 June 1979	17 June 1982	3 years, 12 days	PTr	2nd	Legislative Assembly
	Alan Ganoo (born 1951)	18 June 1982	5 September 1983	1 year, 79 days	MMM	3rd	Legislative Assembly
	Ajay Daby (born 1955)	6 September 1983	4 December 1990	7 years, 89 days	MSM	4th	Legislative Assembly
	Ajay Daby (born 1955)	6 September 1983	4 December 1990	7 years, 89 days	MSM	5th	Legislative Assembly
	Ajay Daby (born 1955)	6 September 1983	4 December 1990	7 years, 89 days	MSM	6th	Legislative Assembly
	Iswardeo Seetaram (1944–2024)	4 December 1990	11 January 1996	5 years, 38 days	MSM	6th	Legislative Assembly
	Iswardeo Seetaram (1944–2024)	4 December 1990	11 January 1996	5 years, 38 days	MSM	1st	National Assembly
	Alan Ganoo (born 1951)	12 January 1996	17 January 1996	5 days	MMM	2nd	National Assembly
	Sir Ramesh Jeewoolall (1941–2019)	23 January 1996	2 October 2000	4 years, 253 days	PTr	2nd	National Assembly
	Dev Ramnah	3 October 2000	27 April 2005	4 years, 206 days	MMM	3rd	National Assembly
	Kailash Purryag (1947–2025)	12 July 2005	23 July 2012	7 years, 11 days	PTr	4th	National Assembly
	Kailash Purryag (1947–2025)	12 July 2005	23 July 2012	7 years, 11 days	PTr	5th	National Assembly
	Razack Peeroo (born 1945)	24 July 2012	8 November 2014	2 years, 107 days	PTr	5th	National Assembly
	Maya Hanoomanjee (born 1952)	22 December 2014	21 November 2019	4 years, 334 days	MSM	6th	National Assembly
	Sooroojdev Phokeer (born 1951)	21 November 2019	16 July 2024	4 years, 238 days	MSM	7th	National Assembly
	Adrien Duval (born 1990)	18 July 2024	5 October 2024	79 days	PMSD	7th	National Assembly
	Shirin Aumeeruddy-Cziffra (born 1948)	29 November 2024	Incumbent	1 year, 283 days	Independent (At the proposal of MMM)	8th	National Assembly
