= Operation Lal Dora =

1983 Indian military operation in Mauritius

- Islands of Mauritius labelled in black.
Date	February–March 1983
Location	Mauritius, Indian Ocean

Belligerents
India (Mauritius) Jugnauth's faction	(Mauritius) Bérenger's faction

Commanders and leaders
(India) Indira Gandhi	(Mauritius) Paul Bérenger

Operation Lal Dora (lit. 'Operation Red Line') was conceived in 1983, with the then Prime Minister of India, Indira Gandhi's approval and called for the secret landing of Indian troops in Mauritius. These troops were to be launched from the 54th division and the purpose of doing this was to help the Mauritian Prime Minister Anerood Jugnauth fight off a challenge from his rival Paul Berenger which Government of India feared might take the form of an attempted coup.

== Background ==
In February 1983, Jugnauth travelled to New Delhi to meet with Mrs Indira Gandhi, where he asked for military assistance in the event of a coup by Berenger. Gandhi assured him of Indian support. The power struggle between Berenger and Jugnauth came to a head in March 1983. On Mauritian independence day, while Jugnauth was in New Delhi attending a Non Aligned Movement summit, Berenger arranged for the Mauritian National Anthem to be broadcast over Mauritian television in Mauritian Creole, referring to the language, instead of English, as the national language. On Jugnauth's return to Mauritius, Berenger proposed constitutional changes that would strip power from the prime minister. The MMM-PSM government disintegrated with Berenger and most of the cabinet resigning from the government. Jugnauth was left with a small number of mostly Hindu followers.

== Operation ==
Gandhi ordered the Indian Army and Navy to prepare for a military intervention against a possible coup against the Jugnauth government. She chose to task the Research and Analysis Wing’s then chief, Nowsher F. Suntook, with supervising a largely intelligence-led operation to reunite the Indian community whose fracturing along ideological and communal lines had allowed Mr. Berenger to mount a political challenge.
