= List of ambassadors of Mauritius to the United States =

Coordinates: 38.907297°N 77.039050°W

Ambassador of Mauritius to the United States
- Inaugural holder: Guy Girald Balancy
- Formation: July 16, 1968

The Mauritian ambassador in Washington, D. C. is the official representative of the Government in Port Louis to the Government of the United States. He is also Permanent Representative next the Headquarters of the United Nations.

== List of representatives ==
Diplomatic agrément	Diplomatic accreditation	Ambassador	Observations	List of prime ministers of Mauritius	List of presidents of the United States	Term end
July 12, 1968	July 16, 1968	Guy Girald Balancy	(Deceased on Sept. 23, 1979)	Seewoosagur Ramgoolam	Lyndon B. Johnson	
September 23, 1979		Chitmansing Jesseramsing	Chargé d'affaires	Seewoosagur Ramgoolam	Jimmy Carter	
January 13, 1982	February 5, 1982	Chitmansing Jesseramsing		Seewoosagur Ramgoolam	Ronald Reagan	
September 10, 1993	October 1, 1993	Anund Neewoor		Anerood Jugnauth	Bill Clinton	
July 8, 1996	July 29, 1996	Chitmansing Jesseramsing		Navin Ramgoolam	Bill Clinton	
February 21, 2001	March 13, 2001	Usha Jeetah		Anerood Jugnauth	George W. Bush	
February 16, 2007	February 27, 2007	Keerteecoomar Ruhee		Navin Ramgoolam	George W. Bush	
January 28, 2011	February 23, 2011	Somduth Soborun	*From August 2004 to February 23, 2011 he was ambassador in Cairo (Egypt) and Chairperson of the Southern African Development Community (SADC) Ambassadors’ Group to Cairo	Navin Ramgoolam	Barack Obama	2014
July 23, 2015	August 3, 2015	Sooroojdev Phokeer		Anerood Jugnauth	Barack Obama	2019
December 13, 2019	May 23, 2021	Mahen Jhugroo		Pravind Jugnauth	Donald Trump	
