= A. M. Sahay =

Indian politician

Anand Mohan Sahay (1898–1991) was an activist of the Indian Independence League who later came to be the Military secretary of the Indian National Army. He was a secretary with ministerial position in the Azad Hind Government of Subhas Chandra Bose. From 1957 until 1960 he was Indian Ambassador to Thailand. His daughter, Lt Bharati 'Asha' Sahay Choudhry served in the Rani of Jhansi Regiment of the Indian National Army in 1945. Another daughter Riziya Sen was mother of Vijaya Teelock.
