= Tamil Mauritians =

Ethnic group

Total population
- 12.4% of Indo-Mauritians - 6% of the total population (2011 census)

Regions with significant populations
- Throughout the country, in Indo-Mauritian majority zones

Languages
- Tamil, Mauritian Creole, French, English

Religion
- Hinduism (As per Mauritian conventions, coverts to Christianity join the broader Creole population)

Related ethnic groups
- Tamil diaspora, Telugu people, Tamil South Africans, Tamil Reunionese, Sri Lankan Tamils, Indian Tamils of Sri Lanka, Tamil Malaysian, Singapore Tamils, Myanmar Tamils, Tamil Guyanese, Tamil Trinidadian and Tobagonian, South Indians in Fiji, Dravidians

Tamil Mauritians are the descendants of Tamil people who migrated, from the South Indian regions corresponding to the modern state of Tamil Nadu, to the island of Mauritius.

== History ==
The first batch of Tamil immigrants were craftsmen and tradesmen who arrived in small numbers after 1727 when Isle de France (Mauritius) was under the administration of France and French East India Company. A larger number of immigrants from Tamil Nadu arrived during British rule and after abolition of slavery from 1835 to serve as labourers on the sugar cane plantations. From 1834 to 1924 out of the estimated 458,000 indentured labourers who came from all over India to Mauritius, around 114,500 came from the Presidency of Madras. Tamil indentured labourers made up 25% of the total indentured population. From around 1850 Tamil was taught in some schools such as Royal College Curepipe.

== Modern times ==
Around 12.4 percent of Indo-Mauritians are Tamils. Tamils make up 6 percent of the island's total population of around 1.3 million accounting for around 78,000 people. As per Mauritian social conventions, the "Tamil", "Marathi" and "Telugu" appellations are strictly reserved for members of these respective ethno-linguistic groups who still practice Hinduism. Converts to Christianity join the broader Creole population. The Tamil population is scattered around the island but mostly lives in the usual Indo-Mauritian majority zones.

== Language ==
Tamil was gradually replaced by Mauritian Creole as the mother tongue of Mauritian Tamils. Nonetheless, most Tamil Mauritians can read and write Tamil as a learnt language. It is one of the Asian languages recognised by Acts of Parliament along with Hindi, Urdu, Chinese, Marathi, Telugu, Bhojpuri, Sanskrit and Arabic and as such taught in schools as from age 6. It is one of the languages that students may sit for their O-Levels and A-Levels. Tamil magazines like Pathirikai cater for the community.

== Festivals ==
Thaipusam, is the principal Tamil Hindu festival, a national holiday in Mauritius and celebrated in various temples across the island. Murugan temples are common and various public places bear names referencing to places in Southern India such as Coromandel near Port Louis, Vellore Street, Madras Street, and others.

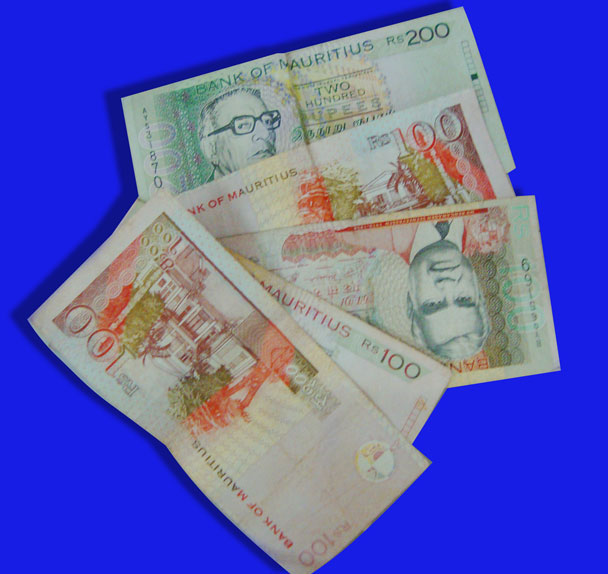
Mauritius currency written in Tamil numerals and Tamil script

== See also ==
- Demographics of Mauritius
- Tamil people
- Tamil language
- Tamil diaspora
- Tamil Malaysians
- Tamil Singaporeans
- Sri Lankan Tamils
- Burmese Tamils
- American Tamils
- Canadian Tamils
- Australian Tamils
- South Indians in Fiji
- Malbars (Tamil Reunionese)
- Indo-Mauritians
