= Razack Peeroo =

Mauritian politician

Razack Peeroo GOSK
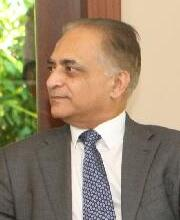

Speaker of the National Assembly
- In office 24 July 2012 – 22 December 2014
- Deputy: Pradeep Peetumber
- Preceded by: Kailash Purryag
- Succeeded by: Maya Hanoomanjee

Personal details
- Born: 16 April 1945 (age 81)

Abdool Razack Mahomed Ameen Peeroo GOSK (born 16 April 1945) served as Speaker of the National Assembly of Mauritius from July 2012 until December 2014.

He was educated at King's College London and is a member of Lincoln's Inn. He previously served as Attorney-General and Minister of Labour, Human Rights and Corporate Affairs from 1995 to 2000.

Political offices
Preceded by Kailash Purryag	Speaker of the National Assembly; 2012–2014	Succeeded by Maya Hanoomanjee
