= PCK Aryan Vedic Hindu Aided School =

Primary school in Vacoas-Phoenix, Mauritius

Pandit Cashinath Kistoe Aryan Vedic Hindu Aided School is a primary school in Vacoas-Phoenix, Mauritius. It is more commonly known as P.C.K. Aryan Vedic School or Aryan Vedic School.

The institution offers education to children up to the Certificate of Primary Education (CPE).

It was founded in 1918 by Pandit Cashinath Kistoe with the assistance of Chirinjiv Bhardwaz, Swami Swatantranand and other social workers. It forms part of the socio-cultural movement broadly known as Arya Samaj in Mauritius. Although it does not teach Hinduism or Vedas, it is founded on Vedic principles of inclusion and diversity. Over decades it has become famous for the ethical practices and hard work of many volunteers over years to achieve the status of a “star school” where people of all faiths seek admissions not only for academic rigour but because they are encouraged to follow their own religion.
