= Bhinod Bacha =

Mauritian politician (1943–2023)

Sir Bhinod Bacha, CMG (1943 – 17 June 2023) was the former most senior Civil Servant (Secretary to Cabinet and Head of the Civil Service) of Mauritius.

He joined the Civil Service in 1968, working mainly at the Prime Minister's Office during Sir Seewoosagur Ramgoolam's and later Sir Anerood Jugnauth's terms in office as Prime Minister. By 1981 he had been promoted to Head of the Civil Service. He was also a board member of several para-statal bodies.

After the 2010 General Elections he was nominated as an Advisor at the Ministry of Land and Housing, but had to resign after the 2014 General Elections.

In February 2017, he was appointed an Advisor at the Prime Minister's Office, soon after the resignation of Sir Anerood Jugnauth.

In the evening of 17 June 2023 Bacha died at Victoria Hospital in Candos after being struck earlier by a car at Orchard Centre's parking lot. Bacha had been dragged underneath the car for a distance as the driver failed to stop on impact, and helpers subsequently had to lift the car in an attempt to rescue the 80-year-old victim.

== Family Life ==
Bhinod Bacha grew up in Mahebourg where he was born. His father Soorooj was an accountant who worked for the local railway company.

Bacha married Rubee Pillay who gave birth to their son Yamesh. However Rubee Pillay died during a house fire. Bacha married his second wife Kathleen Colimalay who gave birth to Lamesh, but both Kathleen and Lamesh later died during a house fire in 1994. In October 2000 Bacha officially married Joyce Prayag-Castellano.

Bacha was instrumental to secure approvals to construct the Hibiscus Boutique Hotel in Pereybere, now owned by his extended family.

== Controversies ==
Following the Quatre Bornes house fire on 6 June 1994 during which his wife Kathleen and son Lamesh Popo died, Sir Bhinod Bacha and his companion Joyce Castellano were jailed and faced murder charges. However they were both acquitted in 1996. A few weeks after the 1994 house fire Harish Boodhoo held a public meeting during which he requested a proper investigation into the 1980's murder of Bacha's first wife Rubee Pillay, the death of Bacha's house-maid by suffocation, as well as the murder of a foreign pilot of Air Mauritius at Pointe d'Esny.

In the morning of 15 December 2003 Bacha was stabbed by an acquaintance, 40-year-old James Edmund Sanhye (also known as Roger Sanhye) in front of La Baguette Magique bakery in Quatre Bornes. Roger Sanhye stated that he was attempting to steal Bacha's car, and denied that it was a revenge attack following Bacha's refusal to bankroll Sanhye's videoclub project.

Following his role as Special Adviser to Navin Ramgoolam, Bacha was interrogated by police in 2015 about his role in the allocation of Crown Land to socio-cultural activist pandit Sungkur for the construction of his private business Rittum Coffee at Mon-Choisy. The representative of the Ministry of Land, public servant Noorani Oozeer, stated that he had been coerced by Navin Ramgoolam via Bacha to breach procedures during this allocation of public property to activist Sungkur.

== Recognition ==
He was knighted in December 1991 during Queen Elizabeth II's 1992 New Year Honours, thus becoming one of the last 2 Mauritians to receive a British honour as a few months later Mauritius became a republic in March 1992.

Government offices
Preceded by Dayendranath Burrenchobay	Secretary to Cabinet & Head of the Civil Service (Mauritius)	Succeeded by Harry Ganoo; Suresh Seeballuck; Yusuf Abdullatiff
