= Ajay Daby =

Mauritian politician

Speaker of the Legislative Assembly
- In office 15 September 1983 – 4 December 1990
- Preceded by: Alan Ganoo
- Succeeded by: Iswardeo Seetaram

Personal details
- Born: Mauritius
- Spouse: Geeta Daby
- Occupation: Barrister

Ajay Chattradhari Daby (अजय छट्रधारी द॓बी) is a barrister and the former Speaker of the Legislative Assembly of Mauritius from 1983 to 1990. He did his secondary schooling at the Royal College of Curepipe. Called to the Bar of England and Wales in 1978, Ajay Daby studied in the United Kingdom and is a member of The Honourable Society of Gray's Inn, London. He is married to Geeta Prayag, a laureate of the Queen Elizabeth College and doctor from the Sheffield University.

Daby started his legal career as a private legal practitioner before joining the State Law Office as State Prosecutor, but only for a very brief period. He soon resigned from his post in the Judiciary to join politics. Elected MP of the PSM in 1982 in Flacq-Bon Acceuil, Constituency No 9 at the age of 26, he became the youngest MP in the country. He was further elected as Deputy Speaker of the Parliament of Mauritius. In 1983, he was one of the founder members of the Militant Socialist Movement (MSM). He was in the same year, re-elected MP of Flacq-Bon Acceuil under the banner of the newly created MSM and went on to become the youngest Speaker of the Commonwealth and Association des Parlementaires de Langue Francaise (AIPLF) at the age of 28. He was re-elected in Constituency No 11 (Rose-Belle/Vieux Grand Port) and was called upon to take the post of Speaker of the Legislative Assembly yet again.

In 1990, on a question of principle, Daby refused to give the casting vote much needed by the then government to change the status of Mauritius to that of a republic and sever ties with the British Crown. He voiced his dissent with his leader and party on this question. The MSM - MMM newly formed coalition not having the required three-quarters majority to expel Mr Daby from his Speakership, went ahead to amend the Constitution to enable the removal of the Speaker by a simple majority. On 5 December 1990, the Constitution of Mauritius was amended accordingly. Mr Daby then joined the Mauritius Labour Party, but for a brief spell only.

In 2001, Mr Daby was made Commissioner for Drug Assets Forfeiture under the Government led by Sir Anerood Jugnauth, and later by Paul Berenger, until 2005, when there was a change of government following general elections.

Daby is back at the bar and is regularly seen in high-profile cases.
