= Armoogum Parsuramen =

Mauritian politician

Armoogum Parsooramen MP
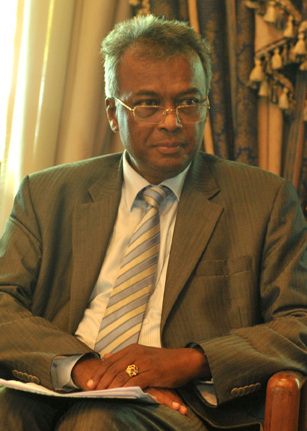
- Parsooramen in 2011

Minister of Education
- In office 1982–1983

Minister of Education
- In office 1983–1987

Minister of Education
- In office 1987–1991

Minister of Education
- In office 1991–1995

Personal details
- Born: 15 June 1951 (age 75) Cap Malheureux British Mauritius
- Party: PSM, MSM
- Education: University of Mauritius

Armoogum Parsooramen (born in 1951), is a Mauritian politician, social worker and former minister.

== Early life, education and career ==
Armoogum Parsooramen grew up with his six brothers and four sisters in Cap Malheureux, a historic village located on the northern coast of Mauritius. His father Vela was a vegetable grower and his mother Rookoo was illiterate. After completing his secondary education at Friendship College (Goodlands) and Bhujoharry College (Port Louis) he started working as a teacher at Friendship College whilst continuing his tertiary education at the University of Mauritius. In 1978 he graduated with a Bachelor of Arts (BA) degree in Administration.

== Political career ==
Armoogum Parsooramen's political career started as president of the Village Council of Petit Raffray in 1978. In 1979 he became president of the Northern District Council. After joining Harish Boodhoo's party PSM he was elected to parliament for the first time in 1982 in Constituency N° 6 (Grand Baie and Poudre D'or) after standing as candidate of the victorious PSM-MMM coalition. When Boodhoo's PSM was dissolved during the political crisis of 1983, to enable the creation of Jugnauth's MSM, Parsooramen became a prominent figure within the new MSM.

He was again elected to Parliament at the 1983, 1987 and 1991 general elections. In 1983 his running mates at Constituency No.6 were Sattyanand Pelladoah and Madan Dulloo within the MSM-PTr alliance; they defeated MMM's Fokeer, Toposee and Etwareeaa. At the 1987 general elections Parsooramen formed part of the MSM-PTr coalition (including Satyadeo Moutia and Madan Dulloo) which defeated MMM's Prem Mungur, Dharmanand Fokeer and Satish Geemul. In 1991, along with his running mates Madan Dulloo and Dharmanand Fokeer of the MSM-MMM coalition, he defeated Xavier Duval, Kailash Purryag Purryag and Gyan Guttea.

During the four consecutive terms in office Parsooramen served as Minister of Education, Arts and Culture as well as Minister of Education and Science until the general elections of 1995, during which he was Campaign Manager of the MSM.

== Social Work ==
In 2011 Armoogum Parsuramen founded the Global Rainbow Foundation to assist paraplegics and disabled Mauritians to purchase prosthetics at low prices. He also started his campaign against the prevention of amputations.
