= Vijaya Teelock =

Mauritian writer

- Born: Mauritius
- Education: University of Mauritius
- Occupations: Historian, Writer
- Title: Vice-Chairperson of the Truth and Justice Commission
- Parent(s): Boodhun Teelock; Riziya Sahay
- Relatives: Anand Mohan Sahay (grandfather)

Vijaya Teelock is a Mauritian historian and writer.

== Early life ==
Vijaya Teelock was born in Mauritius, the daughter of Riziya Sahay (born in Kobe, Japan in 1929) and Boodhun Teelock, a Mauritian doctor who was also the former Mauritian High Commissioner in London. Her maternal grandfather Anand Mohan Sahay was associated with Indian independence movement and was Indian diplomate after Indian Independence. Her grandmother was a niece of Chittaranjan Das.

== Career ==
Vijaya Teelock studied history and lectured at the University of Mauritius. She was the Vice-Chairperson of the Truth and Justice Commission.

She also held the position of president of the Aapravasi Ghat Trust Fund.

== Works ==
Vijaya Teelock has published a number of books since 1995, including the following:

- Transition from slavery in Zanzibar and Mauritius : a comparative history 2016 with Abdul Sheriff ISBN 9782869786806
- Bitter sugar: sugar and slavery in 19th century Mauritius 1993
- A select guide to sources on slavery in Mauritius; and, Slaves speak out: the testimony of slaves in the era of sugar 1995
- History, memory, and identity 2001
- Mauritian history : from its beginnings to modern times 2001
- Maroonage and the maroon heritage in Mauritius 2005
- The vagrant depot of Grand River, its surroundings, and vagrancy in British Mauritius 2004
- Traites, esclavage et transition vers l'engagisme: perspectives nouvelles sur les Mascareignes et le sud-ouest de l'océan Indien, 1715-1848 2015
- Archives nationales de France, Fonds colonies C4 : Île de France
- The Moulin à Poudre cultural landscape: history and archeology with Alain Bénard 2018
- T'Eylandt Mauritius : a history of the Dutch in Mauritius 1998
- A select guide to secondary sources on Mauritian history 2018
- Transition from Slavery in Zanzibar and Mauritius: a Comparative History with Abdul Sheriff 2016
- Archives nationales de France, fonds Colonies C4 Île de France. inventaire sélectif sur l'esclavage 2011
- A short history and description of the Military Hospital in the 18th and 19th centuries 2019
- Angaje : explorations into the history, society and culture of indentured immigrants and their descendants in Mauritius
- The non-adult cohort from Le Morne Cemetery, Mauritius: a snap shot of early life and death after abolition 2014
- From Mozambique to Le Morne Brabant Mountain : being young, male and Mozambican in colonial Mauritius 2005
