= Heeralall Bhugaloo =

Mauritian activist and politician (1938–2021)

Heeralall Bhugaloo MP

3rd Member of Legislative Assembly for No.18
- In office December 1976 – January 1977
- Prime Minister: Seewoosagur Ramgoolam

Personal details
- Born: 28 July 1938 Port Louis, British Mauritius
- Died: 27 November 2021 (aged 83) Mauritius
- Party: MMM, Parti Travailliste

Heeralall Bhugaloo (28 July 1938 – 20 November 2021) was a Mauritian school teacher, activist, politician and minister.

== Early life ==
Heeralall Bhugaloo was born in a Hindu family in Port Louis, British Mauritius. His father was an accountant.

Bhugaloo studied at École de La Montagne and Neo College. He became the manager of Port Louis High School.

== Activism ==
Bhugaloo's interest in journalism led him to create a weekly newspaper Le Combat in 1969 whilst he worked as a teacher and manager at Port Louis High School. After Paul Bérenger's return to Mauritius, following studies at Bangor University, Bhugaloo rebranded his newspaper Le Combat to Le Militant.

In 1969 Veenoo Mootien founded Club des Étudiants and Robin Punchoo founded the Quatre-Bornes Students Association. Mootien and Punchoo then merged their organisations into a single body called Club des Étudiants, which met regularly at Tennyson College, Quatre Bornes. Politician Sham Panchoo assisted his cousin Robin Punchoo, Paul Bérenger, Amédée Darga, Peerally and others to form a new political party. On 12 September 1969 during street protests against Princess Alexandra's visit, 12 of these student-activists (including Heeralall Bhugaloo, Paul Bérenger, and Sushil Khushiram) were arrested by local police. Despite these setbacks the executive committee of the new party formed at Bhugaloo's Port Louis High School. The first elected members of that committee were Heeralall Bhugaloo, Dev Virahsawmy, Jooneed Jeeroobhurkhan, Tirat Ramkissoon, Sushil Khushiram, Ah Ken Wong, Robin Punchoo, and Paul Bérenger.

== Political career ==
Following sitting IFB MP Lall Jugnauth's death in 1970 by-elections were announced in Constituency No.5 Pamplemousses-Triolet and Bhugaloo hosted a meeting at his Port Louis High School to prepare for these elections. The committee of the newly formed party (MMM) chose the heart as its symbol, although the Electoral Commission had restricted its choice to mundane objects such as a tap, watering can, etc. At the same meeting the committee chose purple as the MMM's colour as Bhugaloo was wearing a purple shirt on that day. The committee also chose Labour Party's minister Simadree Virahsawmy's son Dev Virahsawmy as the MMM's candidate, and Dev Virahsawmy proved to be the right choice as he defeated Labour Party's candidate Boodram Nundlall, thus marking the first electoral victory of the new MMM.

Bhugaloo was voted as the President of the MMM. However, by 1972 Bhugaloo had enough of the new party's rigid rules which clashed with his beliefs and preferences. For instance, Bhugaloo preference to communicate in English or French clashed with the MMM's push for Creole. Bhugaloo's favourite attire of a traditional suit-and-tie also clashed with the MMM's preference for informal jeans and jackets, which would appeal more to their target electorate of young and working-class people.

As a candidate of the Parti Travailliste at the December 1976 General Elections in Constituency No. 18 (Quatre Bornes) he was elected to the Legislative Assembly where he served as 3rd member of that constituency, as well as Minister of Education for only a few weeks. In January 1977 Bhugaloo resigned from both the government and Legislative Assembly after being given responsibility to implement Ramgoolam's Free Education policy. Without calling for new by-elections the Electoral Commission applied the Best Loser System formula and nominated Kher Jagatsingh as Bhugaloo's substitute.

At the General Elections of June 1982 Bhugaloo was a candidate of Alliance Nationale in Constituency No. 6 Grand Baie/Poudre D'Or but he was not elected. This marked the end of his involvement in Mauritian politics.
