= Mauritian Bhojpuri =

Indo-Aryan language

- Region: Mauritius
- Ethnicity: Indo-Mauritians (esp. Bihari Mauritians)
- Native speakers: 62,998 (2022 census)
- Language family: Indo-European: Indo-Iranian; Indo-Aryan; Eastern and Central; Bihari and Eastern Hindi; Bhojpuri and Awadhi; Mauritian Bhojpuri
- Early forms: Proto-Indo-European: Proto-Indo-Iranian; Proto-Indo-Aryan; Vedic Sanskrit; Classical Sanskrit; Magadhi and Ardhamagadhi Prakrit (Note: Bhojpuri is descended from Magadhi Prakrit and Awadhi is descended from Ardhamagadhi Prakrit); Magadhan and Ardhamagadhi Apabhraṃśa (Note: Bhojpuri is descended from Magadhan Apabhraṃśa and Awadhi is descended from Ardhamagadhi Apabhraṃśa); Abahattha (Note: Only Bhojpuri is descended from Abahattha, not Awadhi. Awadhi comes straight from Ardhamagadhi Apabhraṃśa); Bhojpuri and Awadhi
- Writing system: Devanagari; Latin-Roman; Perso-Arabic (Note: Nastaliq calligraphic hand, Urdu alphabet)

Official status
- Recognised minority language in: Mauritius
- Regulated by: Mahatma Gandhi Institute

Language codes
- ISO 639-3: –
- Glottolog: maur1239

Mauritian Bhojpuri is an Indo-Aryan language spoken in Mauritius. It is a koiné language of mainly Bhojpuri with considerable influence from Awadhi and some influence from Magahi, Maithili, and Bagheli. It was brought to island by Indian indentured labourers beginning in mid-19th century. It has been influenced by Mauritian Creole, French, English, Standard Hindi, Tamil, and Urdu.

The speech that evolved in Mauritius is not based on a single dialect, but is rather a blend of several varieties of Indian Bhojpuri. It is similar to Caribbean Hindustani, Fiji Hindi, and the Hindustani-Bhojpuri spoken in South Africa.

Over time, Mauritian Bhojpuri has undergone grammatical simplification when compared to its Indian counterpart. The most notable change is in the system of personal pronouns and honorifics. The multiple levels of honorifics (e.g., formal ap, informal tu) found in Indian Bhojpuri have been reduced, with Mauritian Bhojpuri primarily using a single form, tou, for "you". Similarly, the second and third-person plural pronouns have been simplified.

In present Mauritius, the language exists in a complex relationship with Mauritian Creole and Hindi. There is a degree of mutual intelligibility with Hindi, partly due to the teaching of Hindi in schools and access to Hindi-language television. Mauritian Bhojpuri has also been influenced by Mauritian Creole, particularly in its sentence structure and through lexical borrowing, with younger and more urban speakers tending to use more Creole words. The influence is bidirectional; it has been documented that Mauritian Creole has borrowed more than 300 words from Indo-Aryan languages, the majority of which are likely from Bhojpuri.
