= Parti Socialiste Mauricien =

Political party in Mauritius

Mauritian Socialist Party Parti Socialiste Mauricien
- Founded: 16 September 1979
- Dissolved: 1983
- Split from: Labour Party
- Merged into: Militant Socialist Movement
- Ideology: Socialism

The Mauritian Socialist Party (French: Parti Socialiste Mauricien [paʁti sɔsjalist mɔʁisjɛ̃], PSM) was a political party in Mauritius.

== History ==
The Parti Socialiste Mauricien (PSM) was founded by then Labour MP Harish Boodhoo on 16 September 1979 as a splinter group who were expelled from the Labour Party. The other Labour MPs who formed the party were Rohit Beedassy and Radha Gungoosingh. Other prominent members of the PSM were Jocelyn Seenyen, Armoogum Parsooraman and Kishore Deerpalsing.

Prior to the formation of PSM Harish Boodhoo served as a Labour-CAM-PMSD MP from 1976 to 1979 where he repeatedly criticized actions of his own government. The main targets of his criticism were Minister of Finance Sir Veerasamy Ringadoo and two sitting ministers Lutchmeeparsad Badry (Social Security) and Gyandeo Dabee (Cooperatives). These two ministers were forced to resign in May 1979 following a commission of enquiry which was initiated in 1978 to address corruption allegations.

The newly formed PSM held its first public meeting at Place du Quai in Port Louis and it was attended by around 4000 people. The leaders announced that it would adopt white as its official colour as it would be neither have a leftist strategy, nor would it adopt a philosophy of the right. New followers who publicly announced their membership of the party were Floryse Lamy (school teacher), Alain Coosnapen (mechanic at Highlands Sugar Estate), Allan Bhagmania (from Réunion Sugar Estate), Subash Ramdahen and Satianund Pahladi (councillors from Moka-Flacq).

In 1982 the PSM formed a coalition with Mouvement Militant Mauricien (MMM) which won the June 1982 General Elections. Harish Boodhoo became Deputy Prime Minister in the MMM-PSM government led by Prime Minister Aneerood Jugnauth. Within a few months of the 1982 elections there was disagreement within the ruling MMM-PSM coalition. Military intervention by India, in the form of Operation Lal Dora, had also nearly occurred as Finance Minister Paul Bérenger undermined his leader Anerood Jugnauth and Deputy PM Harish Boodhoo. Bérenger was even suspected to be preparing to overthrow PM Jugnauth. These led to the departure of Anerood Jugnauth and other elected members from MMM as he formed a new party MSM. By May 1983 Harish Boodhoo had dissolved his party PSM to enable all PSM parliamentarians to merge into the Jugnauth's new party MSM, thus enabling them to remain in power whilst distancing themselves from Paul Bérenger and his party MMM.
