= Alan Ganoo =

Mauritian politician

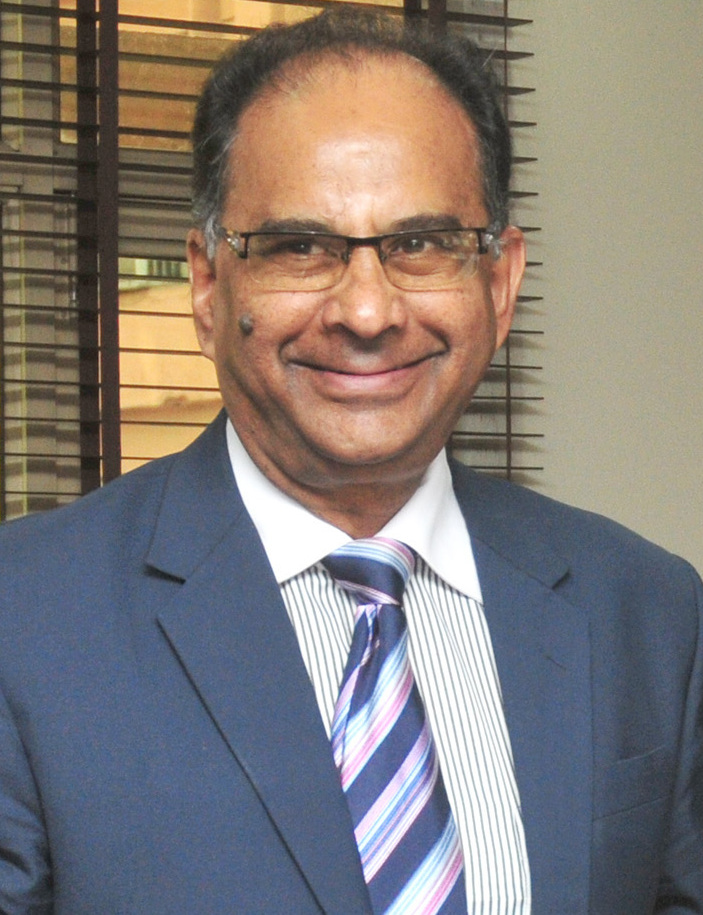

Minister of Land Transport and Light Rail
- In office 12 November 2019 – 12 November 2024
- President: Eddy Balancy (acting); Pradeep Roopun
- Prime Minister: Pravind Jugnauth
- Vice President: Eddy Boissezon

Leader of the Opposition
- In office 28 January 2013 – 1 October 2013
- Preceded by: Paul Bérenger
- Succeeded by: Paul Bérenger

Speaker of the Legislative Assembly
- In office 18 June 1982 – 5 September 1983
- Preceded by: Sir Ramesh Jeewoolall
- Succeeded by: Ajay Daby

Speaker of the National Assembly
- In office 12 January 1996 – 17 January 1996
- Preceded by: Iswardeo Seetaram
- Succeeded by: Sir Ramesh Jeewoolall

Personal details
- Born: 17 January 1951 (age 75) Port Louis, British Mauritius
- Party: Mouvement Patriotique Alan Ganoo

Alan Ganoo (born 17 January 1951) is a Mauritian politician who has been elected to serve as member of the Legislative Assembly and National Assembly on 9 occasions.

== Early life and education ==
Alan Ganoo was born in Port Louis, his father was a police sergeant and he grew up with four sisters and two brothers. Under British rule of the 1800s his ancestors migrated to Mauritius from Maharashtra, India.

He completed his secondary education at Royal College Port Louis. He studied law at Middle Temple and at King's College London and has practised as a barrister since 1975.

== Political career ==
He joined the Mauritian Militant Movement (MMM) in the 1970s and was elected to the Legislative Assembly for the first time in 1982. He was elected leader of the MMM party in 2013. In May 2015 Alan Ganoo and several other politicians left the MMM where he was Deputy Leader and formed a new party called Mouvement Patriotique. He has so far been elected for 9 times in the same constituency (No.14) namely in 1982, 1987, 1991, 1995, 2000, 2005, 2010, 2014 and 2019. A few weeks before the 2019 elections there was a dispute over the ownership of the party that he had created in 2015. In October 2019 his newly-formed party became part of the Alliance Morisien, led by the MSM and which won the General Elections.

Alan Ganoo has held office of Minister in Ministry of Justice and Attorney-General (1991-1993), Minister of Housing (1996-1997), Minister of Public Utilities (2000-2005), Acting Minister of Fisheries (2004 to 2005) and Minister of Land Transport and Light Rail (2019–present). Other parliamentary positions that he has held were Speaker (1982), Opposition Whip (1987-1990), Deputy Chief Whip (1990) and Leader of the Opposition (2013).

Between 2012 and 2015 Alan Ganoo has also held positions on parliamentary committees such as Member of Committee of Selection, Chairperson of the Public Accounts Committee, Member of the Standing Orders Committee, Member of the Select Committee on Live Broadcasting of House Proceedings and Chairperson of the Public Accounts Committee in 2015.

As from 12 November 2019 he holds the portfolio of Minister of Land Transport and Light Rail following his election as the first member for Constituency No.14, Savanne and Black River during the 2019 General Elections.
