= Kishore Deerpalsing =

Mauritian politician

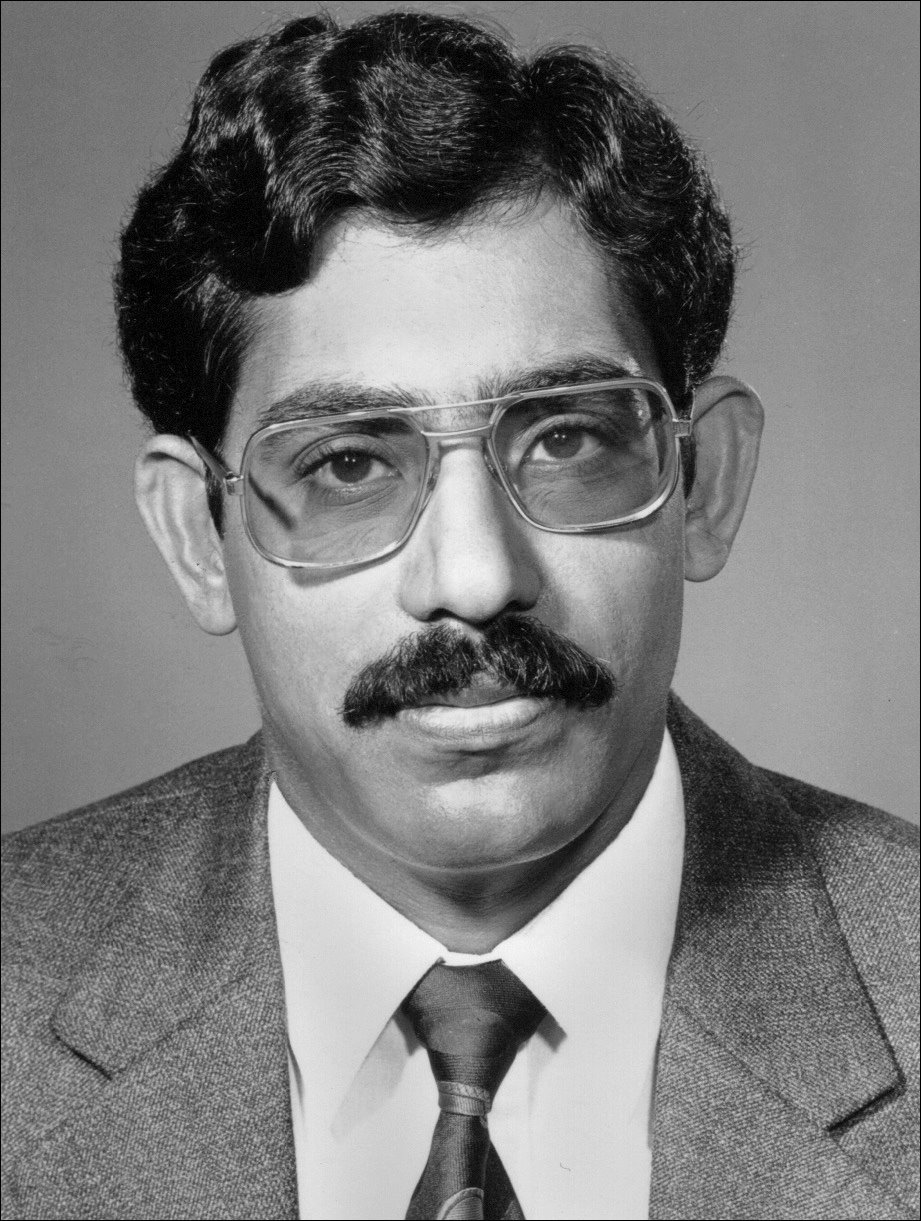

Minister of Health
- In office 1998–2000

Minister of Agriculture
- In office 1982–1985

Personal details
- Born: 15 October 1947 Mauritius
- Died: 9 February 2018 (aged 70)
- Party: Mauritian Socialist Party; Militant Socialist Movement

Kishore Deerpalsing (1947–2018) was a Mauritian politician, academic and former minister.

== Early life, education & career ==
Kishore Deerpalsing worked as Senior Lecturer at The University of Mauritius after completing his university studies.

== Political career ==
Kishore Deepalsing's political career started in Harish Boodhoo's party PSM in 1979. He was elected to parliament in 1982 in Constituency N°14 (Savanne-Rivière-Noire) as PSM-MMM candidate and served as Minister of Agriculture under Anerood Jugnauth until 1985, having been re-elected in 1983 as MSM candidate. The Amsterdam Boys Scandal was the trigger for Deerpalsing's resignation in 1985 when 4 members of Parliament and members of the MSM party were arrested with hard drugs at the international Amsterdam Airport Schiphol.

At the 1991 elections he was defeated at Constituency N°13 (Rivière des Anguilles/ Souillac). In 1995 he was elected to Parliament at Constituency N°13 with a score of 63.1%, which has since not been beaten in this constituency. He eventually becoming Minister of Health in 1998 before resigning in 2000 due to the Mediclinic Scandal. Deerpalsing was the subject of allegations of corruption regarding the procurement of medical equipment for clinics at De Belvedère and L’Escalier. The investigation by the Economic Crime Office (ECO) eventually cleared Deerpalsing of any wrong-doing.
