= Lutchmeeparsadsing Ramsahok =

Mauritian politician (1948–2017)

Lutchmeeparsadsing Ramsahok MP

2nd Member of Legislative Assembly for No.12
- In office December 1976 – June 1982
- Prime Minister: Seewoosagur Ramgoolam

1st Member of Legislative Assembly for No.12
- In office June 1982 – August 1983
- Prime Minister: Anerood Jugnauth

1st Member of Legislative Assembly for No.12
- In office August 1983 – April 1987
- Prime Minister: Anerood Jugnauth

Personal details
- Born: 1948 Mare d'Albert, British Mauritius
- Died: 20 July 2017 (aged 69) Mauritius
- Party: MMM MSM PAL

Lutchmeeparsadsing Ramsahok (1948-2017) was a Mauritian trade unionist, politician and minister.

== Early life ==
Lutchmeeparsadsing Ramsahok (also known as Lutchmeeparsad Ramsewak or Lutchmeeparsad Ramsewok) was born in a Hindu family in Mare d'Albert, Mauritius.

== Career as a Trade Unionist ==
Ramsahok became President of the Tea Industry Workers Union in 1971. Three years later he was elected President of the General Workers Federation (GWF) in 1974.

He was first elected in Mauritian Parliament in 1976 under the MMM in the Constituency No 12 (Mahebourg). In his 3rd term (1983) in Mauritius Assembly he assumed the post as Minister of Local Government (Secretary of local government and affairs) under Prime Minister Sir Aneerood Jugnauth.

== Political career ==
As a candidate of the MMM at the 1976 General Elections in Constituency No. 12 (Mahebourg Plaine Magnien) he was elected to the Legislative Assembly where he served as member of the Opposition. In June 1982 Ramsahok was again elected in Constituency No.12 as candidate of MMM-PSM coalition.

In 1983 Ramsahok was one of the founding fathers of the new party MSM which was originally a splinter group from the MMM and led by Anerood Jugnauth.

At the August 1983 elections he was voted back in Parliament as candidate of the Labour-MSM alliance, where he served as Minister of Local Government until April 1987 when he was forced to resign due to the publication of the report of the Judge Maurice Rault's Commission of Enquiry on Drug Trafficking (1986).

The drug allegations were unfounded and dismissed and August 2, 1990, Sir Aneerood Jugnauth (Sitting Prime Minister) made a written statement, read by his lawyer Sir Hamid Moollan and his solicitor Sachidanand Veerasamy that he made a mistake in saying that we were Amsterdam Boys and on the second day, i.e. the 3 August 1990, the Intermediate Court ruled as follows:

« Defendant also states that he was aware that there were many accusations, rumours and allegation against the plaintiff. Yet the defendant never have any evidence that the plaintiff was ever involved in drug trafficking. The defendant is not one than the Prime Minister and Minister of Interior for which the police department is attached in his ministry. So that it is clear to conclude that the plaintiff is innocent in the question of drug trafficking”.

Ramsahok did not take part in the 1987 General Elections. He formed a new party called Parti Action Liberal and was a candidate of that party at the general elections of 1991, 1995, 2000, 2010 and 2014 but he was not elected.
