= Harish Boodhoo =

Former deputy prime minister of Mauritius (born 1946)

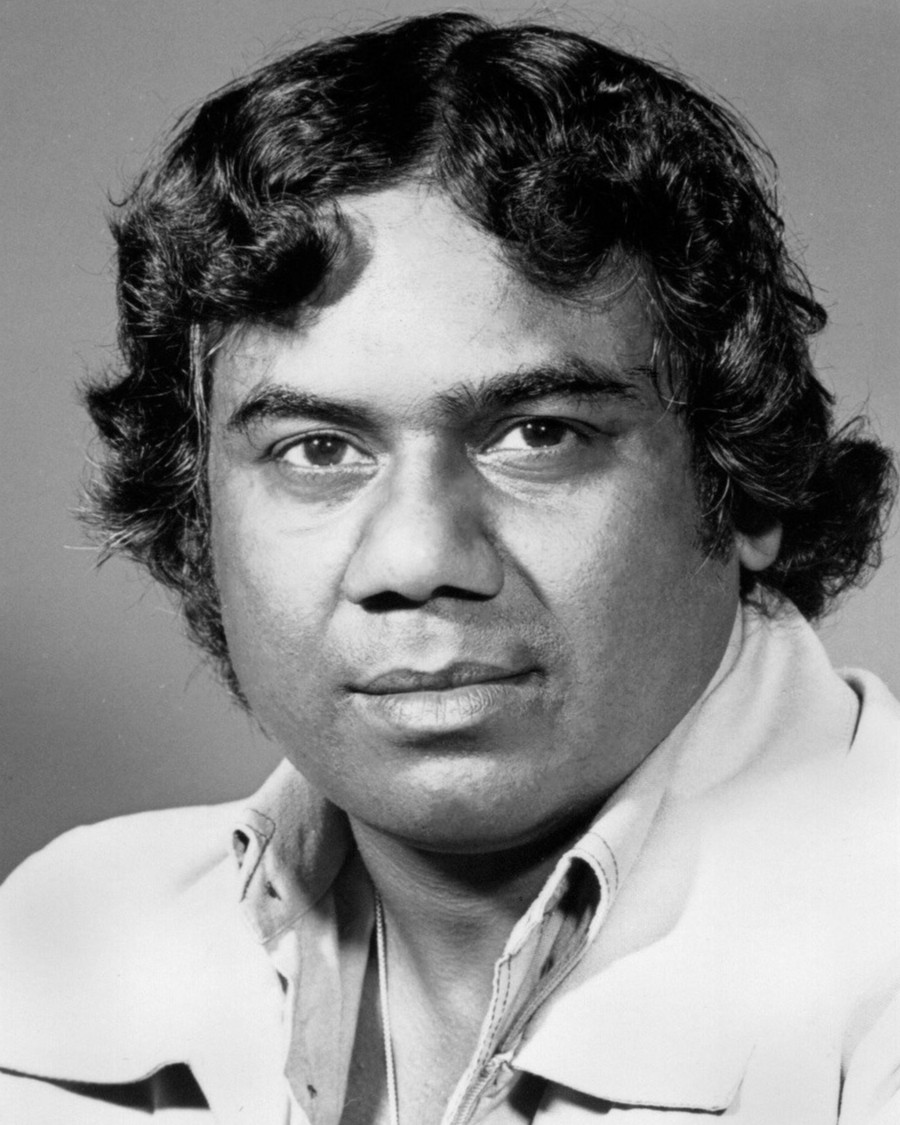

Deputy Prime Minister of Mauritius
- In office 2 July 1982 – 21 August 1983
- Monarch: Elizabeth II
- Governor General: Dayendranath Burrenchobay
- Prime Minister: Anerood Jugnauth
- Preceded by: Office established
- Succeeded by: Gaëtan Duval

Chief Whip
- In office August 1983 – 1986

Member of Parliament; for Riviere des Anguilles and Souillac
- In office 20 December 1976 – 5 August 1987
- Preceded by: Kistnasamy Sunassee
- Succeeded by: Ramduth Jaddoo

Personal details
- Born: 12 September 1946 (age 79) British Mauritius

Harisun Boodhoo more commonly known as Harish Boodhoo, (born in Belle Terre, Vacoas-Phoenix, Mauritius on 12 September 1946) is a Mauritian political figure who served as Deputy Prime Minister of Mauritius from 11 June 1982 to 21 August 1983. He was elected Member of Parliament (MP) in 1976, 1982 and 1983 in Rivière des Anguilles and Souillac (Constituency No. 13).

== Early life and education ==
Boodhoo attended the Camp Fouqueraux primary school and completed his School Certificate at Mauritius College, Curepipe. He worked as a labourer before attending Teachers’ Training College. He then worked as a school teacher.

== Ancestry and family life ==
In the 1800s Boodhoo's ancestors migrated from the state of Bihar in India. His father and mother were both Mauritians who worked as labourers on Highlands Sugar Estate. At the time of his birth Harish's father had already died and his mother continued to work as a labourer to support her six children. In 1973 Harish Boodhoo married school teacher Sarita Boodhoo and they have no children.

== Political career ==
Boodhoo became involved with socio-cultural movement Siva Shivir in 1968 and he campaigned against the consumption of alcohol and cigarettes in Mauritian villages. In 1976 he was approached by Sir Seewoosagur Ramgoolam to join the Labour Party (Mauritius) (PTr). He was elected to the Legislative Assembly or National Assembly of Mauritius at the 1976 General Elections as part of the Independence Party (Mauritius) coalition government made up of Labour and CAM which allianced with rival PMSD after the elections.He represented Constituency No. 13 (Riviere des Anguilles and Souillac) where the other 2 elected members were his rivals Suresh Poonith and Swaley Kasenally of the MMM.

From 1976 to 1979 Boodhoo served as a member of Legislative Assembly (MLA) under the Labour-CAM-PMSD coalition but he criticized various aspects of the ruling government. He was especially critical of the Minister of Finance Sir Veerasamy Ringadoo's budget, leading to nationwide strikes in June 1979. Boodhoo also instigated a commission of enquiry in 1978 which led to the resignation of two sitting ministers Lutchmeeparsad Badry (Social Security) and Gyandeo Dabee (Cooperatives) in May 1979. Eventually Harish Boodhoo and two other Labour parliamentarians (Radha Gungoosingh and Rohit Beedassy) who supported him were dismissed from the Labour Party in late 1979.

In December 1979 he formed a new party Parti Socialiste Mauricien (PSM) and was joined by other disgruntled members of the ruling Labour Party. In 1982 he formed a coalition with Mouvement Militant Mauricien (MMM) which won the 1982 General Elections. Harish Boodhoo became Deputy Prime Minister in the MMM-PSM government led by Prime Minister Aneerood Jugnauth after his election in Constituency No.13. ahead of his running mates Vishnu Lutchmeenaraidoo and Swaley Kasenally. Whilst still in power there was disagreement within the ruling coalition of MMM-PSM which led to the departure of Aneerood Jugnauth and other elected members from MMM as he formed a new party MSM. At the same time Harish Boodhoo dissolved his party PSM so that all PSM parliamentarians could merge into the new party MSM in order to stay in power whilst distancing themselves from Paul Bérenger and his party MMM. He was Chief Whip until the 1983 General Elections. At the August 1983 elections Harish Boodhoo was elected under the MSM banner (part of the victorious MSM-Labour-PMSD coalition) at Constituency No. 13 (Riviere des Anguilles and Souillac), behind his running mates Vishnu Lutchmeenaraidoo and Ambah Chinien. However he was dismissed from the MSM in 1986 and Boodhoo did not take part in the 1987 General Elections.

At the September 1991 general elections Harish Boodhoo stood as candidate of the Labour-PMSD coalition in Constituency No.12 (Mahébourg Plaine Magnien). But he was defeated there as elected members in that constituency were Vasant Bunwaree (Labour-PMSD), Ivan Collendavelloo (MSM-MMM) and Mookhesswur Choonee (MSM-MMM).

In 1999 he relaunched the defunct party All Mauritius Hindu Congress (AMHC) which had originally been active from 1965 to 1968.

== Contributions and legacy ==
Whilst in government Boodhoo campaigned for reform in the sugar industry, protection of public beaches from private ownership and fought against corruption. In 1979 two of his Labour Party colleagues (ministers Badry and Dabee) had to resign based on findings of a commission of enquiry (led by Victor Glover (judge)) which was instigated by Harish Boodhoo's corruption allegations.

Since 2004 he has also publicly campaigned for legislative changes against the "Sale by Levy" system which had been abused by unscrupulous businessmen and lawyers to the detriment of numerous Mauritian borrowers.

From 1979 to 1983 he published a daily newspaper Le Socialiste. Until 2008 Harish Boodhoo published newspaper Sunday Vani. Since 2011 Harish Boodhoo has produced daily articles on social media and since early 2020 these are complemented by a daily video clip.

== Controversies ==
=== Multiple jail terms after revelations ===
Boodhoo was sentenced and jailed numerous times following lawsuits involving allegations against judges and politicians. When found guilty he opted for jail time instead of paying the fines. He was criticised for suppressing press freedom when he was part of the ruling government.

=== Refusal by Basdeo Bissoondoyal ===
Following the 1982 general elections and when Mauritius was not yet a republic Basdeo Bissoondoyal refused Harish Boodhoo's offer to become the first President of a contemplated Republic of Mauritius.

=== Meeting with MCB-NPF fraud mastermind Teeren Appasamy ===
In 2003 following the MCB-NPF scandal, whereby Rs. 886 millions of pension funds were swindled, Harish Boodhoo and lawyer Rama Valayden travelled to England and met Teeren Appasamy, the mastermind of the swindle. However after their return to Mauritius Boodhoo and Valayden did not deliver any major revelations as they had earlier promised and the stolen funds have not been recovered.

Political offices
Preceded by Gaëtan Duval	Deputy Prime Minister of Mauritius; 1982 – 1983	Succeeded by Gaëtan Duval
