= Rodrigues (constituency) =

Mauritian parliamentary constituency

- Constituency for the Mauritius National Assembly
- Autonomous region: Rodrigues
- Electorate: 32,986 (2024)

Current constituency
- Created: 1966
- Seats: 2 (plus any additional BLS seats)
- Party: OPR; AL
- Elected members: Marie Roxana Collet; Francisco François
- Best Losers: Dianette Henriette-Manan; Jacques Édouard

Rodrigues is a parliamentary constituency represented in the National Assembly of Mauritius. The entire island of Rodrigues, an autonomous region of Mauritius, forms the constituency. It is the only constituency that elects two members to the assembly, with all of the other constituencies electing three members.

Since 2024, four members currently represent the constituency. Both of the elective seats of Rodrigues are represented by Marie Roxana Collet and Francisco François from the Rodrigues People's Organisation. An additional two best loser seats were allocated to the Alliance Liberation, which are represented by Dianette Henriette-Manan and Jacques Édouard.

== Constituency profile ==
The constituency was established in 1966 through an Order in Council after Clement Roussety, a Rodriguan who would eventually be elected as one of the constituency's first members, filed a case to the Supreme Court that the general elections held in 1959 and 1963 were unconstitutional because Rodrigues was omitted from participating it, thus becoming unrepresented.

In the following year, the constituency was first contested in the 1967 general election with both seats going to the Parti Mauricien Social Démocrate. Since then, the constituency continues to represent two elected members, with a possibility of members being chosen through the Best Loser System. In the general elections held in 1995, 2000, 2005 and 2024, the constituency saw a total of four members elected and chosen to represent the island, the most it had so far.

=== Political history ===
Because the constituency composes of the entire island of Rodrigues, it also represents the trends of the island's political affiliation and history over time. The constituency and the island itself has been considered as a bastion of the Parti Mauricien Social Démocrate (PMSD), with Gaëtan Duval himself being elected under the best loser system in 1982. However, with the rise of regionalism and the establishment of the Rodrigues People's Organisation (OPR), the PMSD's hold over the constituency and the island itself has declined and it last contested the constituency in 2019.

The OPR has dominated the political life of the island and the constituency since it first won both seats in 1982. Serge Clair, the first leader of the party, represented the constituency from 1982 until his resignation in 2002 to take up the Chief Commissioner of the island.

In 1995, the dominance of the OPR was challenged by the Rodrigues Movement (MR) with both of its candidates being chosen as best losers for Rodrigues. The four seat representation continued until 2010, when the MR finally managed to challenge the OPR by winning both of the constituency's seats and relegating the OPR to a single best loser seat.

Since 2014, the OPR regained its position by gaining both elected seats. In 2024, the role of MR as the second party faded with the emergence of Alliance Liberation, a political alliance composed of other minor Rodriguan parties, contesting the general election and winning two best loser seats.

== Members ==
This list only considers the succession of seats between members and does not necessarily take into account the order in which members are elected in each election. Years in italic indicate a by-election or a change in party affiliation.

Election	Elected	Elected	Best Loser	Best Loser
1967	Guy Ollivry (PMSD)	Clement Roussety (PMSD)	—N/a	
1976	Cyiril Guimbeau (PMSD)	Nicol François (PMSD)	—N/a	
1982	France Félicité (OPR)	Serge Clair (OPR)	Gaëtan Duval (PMSD)	Nicol François (PMSD)
1983	France Félicité (OPR)	Serge Clair (OPR)	—N/a	
1987	Zita Jean-Louis (OPR)	Serge Clair (OPR)	—N/a	
1991	Benoît Jolicoeur (OPR)	Serge Clair (OPR)	—N/a	
1995	Benoît Jolicoeur (OPR)	Serge Clair (OPR)	Nicolas Von Mally (MR)	Alex Nancy (MR)
2000	Alex Nancy (OPR)	Serge Clair (OPR)	Nicolas Von Mally (MR)	Christian Léopold (MR)
2002	Alex Nancy (OPR)	Robert Speville (OPR)	Nicolas Von Mally (MR)	Christian Léopold (MR)
2005	Alex Nancy (OPR)	Robert Speville (OPR)	Nicolas Von Mally (MR)	Christian Léopold (MR)
2010	Christian Leopold (MR)	Nicolas Von Mally (MR)	Francisco François (OPR)	—N/a
2014	Francisco François (OPR)	Buisson Leopold (OPR)	—N/a	
2019	Francisco François (OPR)	Buisson Leopold (OPR)	—N/a	
2024	Francisco François (OPR)	Marie Roxana Collet (OPR)	Dianette Henriette-Manan (AL)	Jacques Édouard (AL)

== Election results ==
Green background denotes an elected member, yellow for a member elected through the Best Loser System and red for an unsuccessful incumbent member (whether from the same or different constituency).

=== Elections in the 2020s ===
2024 general election: Rodrigues
Candidate	Party	Votes	%
Marie Roxana Collet	OPR	11,268	50.20
Francisco François	OPR	11,148	49.66
Dianette Henriette-Manan	AL	10,507	46.81
Jacques Édouard	AL	10,033	44.70
Martheline Edouard	MR	373	1.66
Reddy Augustin	MR	360	1.60
Bernadin Moutien	MIR	216	0.96
Marie Jana Perrine	Independent	180	0.80
Marie Mauria Perrine	MIR	180	0.80
Jean Christian Bégué	PLUR	147	0.65
Jenifer Ste Marie	Independent	127	0.57
Carl Larose	PLUR	110	0.49
Jean Macdonell Milazar	PRTD	110	0.49
Marie Jessifa Legentil	PRTD	108	0.48
Total		44,867	100.00
Valid votes		22,447	98.52
Invalid/blank votes		338	1.48
Total votes		22,785	100.00
Registered voters/turnout		32,986	69.07
Source: OEC, OEC

=== Elections in the 2010s ===
2019 general election: Rodrigues
Candidate	Party	Votes	%
Francisco François	OPR	10,631	56.61
Buisson Léopold	OPR	10,146	54.02
Philippe Vincent Perrine	PMSD	5,737	30.55
Marie Pierrette Patricia Prosper	PMSD	5,238	27.89
Joseph Marioline Spéville	MR	1,283	6.83
Jean Pierre Claudarel Botshare	MR	1,179	6.28
Johnson Roussety	FPRE	1,086	5.78
Karen Edicka Carolina Castel	MIR	697	3.71
Joseph Rommel Farla	FPRE	570	3.03
Angel Jenna l'Évêque	MIR	534	2.84
Jean-Noël Baptiste	Independent	248	1.32
Robert Speville	Independent	213	1.13
Total		37,562	100.00
Valid votes		18,781	97.13
Invalid/blank votes		554	2.87
Total votes		19,335	100.00
Registered voters/turnout		30,399	63.60
Source: OEC, OEC

2014 general election: Rodrigues
Candidate	Party or alliance		Votes	%
Francisco François	OPR		10,477	53.51
Buisson Léopold	OPR		10,456	53.40
Joseph Chenlye Lamvohee	MR		9,468	48.35
Nicolas Von Mally	MR		9,347	47.74
Johnson Roussety	MMR–FPR	FPR	635	3.24
Christian Léopold	MMR–FPR	MMR	424	2.17
Marie Rosanne Andre	MIR		89	0.45
Marie Debora Ah-Chine Roberts	MIR		80	0.41
Total			40,976	100.00
Source: OEC

2010 general election: Rodrigues
Candidate	Party	Votes	%
Christian Léopold	MR	10,477	50.98
Nicolas Von Mally	MR	10,456	50.88
Francisco François	OPR	9,468	46.07
Soopramanien Sooprayen	OPR	9,347	45.48
Alex Nancy	UDR	635	3.09
Robert Speville	UDR	424	2.06
François Collet	FPPR	89	0.43
Jean Macdonell Milazar	PRTD	80	0.39
Reddy Augustin	FPPR	79	0.38
Jean Jowetson Casimir	PRTD	49	0.24
Total		41,104	100.00
Source: OEC

=== Elections in the 2000s ===
2005 general election: Rodrigues
Candidate	Party	Votes	%
Alex Nancy	OPR	10,343	51.68
Robert Speville	OPR	9,950	49.72
Christian Léopold	MR	9,791	48.93
Nicolas Von Mally	MR	9,756	48.75
Jacques Desiré Castel	RRR	97	0.48
Reddy Augustin	FPPR	87	0.43
Total		40,024	100.00
Source: OEC

2002 by-election (14 December): Rodrigues
Candidate	Party	Votes	%
Robert Speville	OPR	9,948	61.87
Lordana Meunier	MR	5,991	37.26
Joseph Louis Rosaire Perrine	Mouvement Socialiste Rodriguais	74	0.46
Jacques Desiré Castel	Ralliement des Rodriguais	51	0.32
Kennel Begue	Independent	16	0.10
Total		16,080	100.00
Source: OEC

2000 general election: Rodrigues
Candidate	Party	Votes	%
Alex Nancy	OPR	8,695	51.38
Serge Clair	OPR	8,622	50.95
Nicolas Von Mally	MR	8,069	47.68
Christian Léopold	MR	7,732	45.69
France Félicité	PMXD	277	1.64
Reddy Augustin	PMXD	172	1.02
Soopramanien Sooprayen	Independent	147	0.87
Kennel Begue	Independent	51	0.30
Jean Jowetson Casimir	MDM	42	0.25
Louis Maxime Reynolds Oudin	MDM	41	0.24
Total		33,848	100.00
Source: OEC

=== Elections in the 1990s ===
1995 general election: Rodrigues
Candidate	Party	Votes	%
Benoît Jolicoeur	OPR	8,398	63.60
Serge Clair	OPR	8,233	62.35
Nicolas Von Mally	MR	4,845	36.69
Alex Nancy	MR	4,684	35.47
Soopramanien Sooprayen	Independent	248	1.88
Total		26,408	100.00
Source: OEC

1991 general election: Rodrigues
Candidate	Party or alliance		Votes	%
Serge Clair	OPR		8,154	58.17
Benoît Jolicoeur	OPR		7,926	56.55
France Félicité	RPR		5,946	42.42
Nicolas Von Mally	RPR		5,700	40.66
Soopramanien Sooprayen	Independent		189	1.35
Bernardine Flore	PTr–PMSD	PMSD	119	0.85
Total			28,034	100.00
Source: OEC

=== Elections in the 1980s ===
1987 general election: Rodrigues
Candidate	Party	Votes	%
Serge Clair	OPR	8,626	59.76
Zita Jean-Louis	OPR	8,418	58.32
France Félicité	RPR	6,139	42.53
Nicolas Von Mally	RPR	5,687	39.40
Total		28,870	100.00
Source: OEC

1983 general election: Rodrigues
Candidate	Party	Votes	%
France Félicité	OPR	8,018	63.56
Serge Clair	OPR	7,963	63.13
Allan Driver	PMSD	4,255	33.73
Nicol François	PMSD	4,164	33.01
Jean Baptiste Maximilien Lucchéssi	Independent	42	0.33
Pierre Giro Plaiche	Front Mauricien Independant	17	0.13
Yves Agathe	Front Mauricien Independant	13	0.10
Louis Roussel Perrine	Parti Ouvrier Progressiste	9	0.07
Marcel Prudence	Parti Ouvrier Progressiste	7	0.06
Total		24,488	100.00
Source: OEC

1982 general election: Rodrigues
Candidate	Party	Votes	%
France Félicité	OPR	8,100	64.21
Serge Clair	OPR	8,029	63.65
Gaëtan Duval	PMSD	4,621	36.63
Nicol François	PMSD	4,465	35.40
Yves Agathe	Independent	13	0.10
Total		25,228	100.00
Source: OEC

=== Elections in the 1970s ===
1976 general election: Rodrigues
Candidate	Party or alliance		Votes	%
Cyril Guimbeau	PMSD		5,392	57.26
Nicol François	PMSD		5,304	56.33
Serge Clair	OPR		3,241	34.42
Daril Perrine	OPR		3,135	33.29
Joseph Karl Elysée	Independence Party	PTr	854	9.07
Joseph Marcel Mason	Independence Party	PTr	654	6.95
Jean Max Lucchéssi	Independent		132	1.40
Soopramanien Sooprayen	Independent		120	1.27
Total			18,832	100.00
Source: OEC

=== Elections in the 1960s ===
1967 general election: Rodrigues
Candidate	Party or alliance		Votes	%
Guy Ollivry	PMSD		6,842	96.90
Clement Roussety	PMSD		6,803	96.35
Joseph Augustin Bazile Allas	Parti Rodriguais		232	3.29
Joseph Karl Elysée	Independent		162	2.29
Jean Max Lucchési	Independence Party	PTr	83	1.18
Total			14,122	100.00
Source: OEC

== See also ==
- Constituencies of Mauritius
