= 2022 Rodrigues Regional Assembly election =

- 27 February 2022
- 17 seats in the Rodrigues Regional Assembly; 9 seats needed for a majority
Party	Leader	Vote %	Seats	+/–
OPR		46.22	8	−2
Rodrigues Alliance		26.23	5	+5
UPR-MIR-MMR		25.38	4	+4
This lists parties that won seats. See the complete results below.
Result by constituency
Chief Commissioner before	Chief Commissioner after
Serge Clair; OPR	Johnson Roussety; Rodrigues Alliance

Elections for the Rodrigues Regional Assembly were held on 27 February 2022. They were the fifth election of the island's regional parliament since Rodrigues obtained autonomous status within the Republic of Mauritius in 2001.

== Results ==
Party	List			Constituency			Total seats	+/–
Party	Votes	%	Seats	Votes	%	Seats	Total seats	+/–
Rodrigues People's Organisation	10,777	46.22	2	21,896	46.95	6	8	–2
Rodrigues Alliance	6,116	26.23	1	11,714	25.12	4	5	New
UPR-MIR-MMR	5,918	25.38	2	12,079	25.90	2	4	+4
Rodrigues Movement	507	2.17	0	947	2.03	0	0	–7
Total	23,318	100.00	5	46,636	100.00	12	17	0
Valid votes	23,318	96.08		23,318	96.08			
Invalid/blank votes	951	3.92		951	3.92			
Total votes	24,269	100.00		24,269	100.00			
Registered voters/turnout	31,450	77.17		31,450	77.17			

=== By constituency ===
Nº1 La Ferme
Candidate	Party	Votes	%
Jean Nicolas Volbert	UPR-MIR-MMR	2,290	59.82
Jean Alain Wong So	UPR-MIR-MMR	2,250	58.78
Marie Pricie Anjela Spéville	Rodrigues People's Organisation	1,466	38.30
Gaëtan Jabeemissar	Rodrigues People's Organisation	1,401	36.60
Jacques Harry Chévéry	Rodrigues Movement	132	3.45
Marie Diana Natacha Lam To	Rodrigues Movement	117	3.06
Total		7,656	100.00
Valid votes		3,828	94.68
Invalid/blank votes		215	5.32
Total votes		4,043	100.00
Registered voters/turnout		5,373	75.25

Nº2 Marechal
Candidate	Party	Votes	%
Joseph Varok Ravina	Rodrigues Alliance	2,024	61.30
Marie Christiane Agathe	Rodrigues Alliance	1,882	57.00
Jean Noel Nemours	Rodrigues People's Organisation	1,317	39.88
Marie Roxana Collet	Rodrigues People's Organisation	1,293	39.16
Marie Arlèse Legoff	Rodrigues Movement	46	1.39
Marie Jessica Gentil	Rodrigues Movement	42	1.27
Total		6,604	100.00
Valid votes		3,302	96.13
Invalid/blank votes		133	3.87
Total votes		3,435	100.00
Registered voters/turnout		4,459	77.04

Nº3 Saint Gabriel
Candidate	Party	Votes	%
Jean Rex Ramdally	Rodrigues People's Organisation	2,253	50.75
Rose Marie Gaspard Pierre Louis	Rodrigues People's Organisation	2,235	50.35
Dianette Henriette-Manan	UPR-MIR-MMR	2,132	48.03
Philippe Vincent Perrine	UPR-MIR-MMR	2,050	46.18
Marie Dorothy Lalanne	Rodrigues Movement	105	2.37
Joseph Clément Clair	Rodrigues Movement	103	2.32
Total		8,878	100.00
Valid votes		4,439	96.12
Invalid/blank votes		179	3.88
Total votes		4,618	100.00
Registered voters/turnout		5,857	78.85

Nº4 Baie Aux Huitres
Candidate	Party	Votes	%
Nicolson Lisette	Rodrigues People's Organisation	1,753	53.33
Karine Roussety	Rodrigues People's Organisation	1,673	50.90
Périeux François	Rodrigues Alliance	1,576	47.95
Marie Jana Perrine	Rodrigues Alliance	1,480	45.03
Jacquelin Von-Mally	Rodrigues Movement	52	1.58
Jean Philippe Augustin	Rodrigues Movement	40	1.22
Total		6,574	100.00
Valid votes		3,287	95.86
Invalid/blank votes		142	4.14
Total votes		3,429	100.00
Registered voters/turnout		4,534	75.63

Nº5 Port Mathurin
Candidate	Party	Votes	%
Johnson Roussety	Rodrigues Alliance	2,416	53.06
Louis Ange Perrine	Rodrigues Alliance	2,336	51.31
Jean Noël Samoisy	Rodrigues People's Organisation	2,126	46.69
Jean Richard Payendee	Rodrigues People's Organisation	2,011	44.17
Joseph Fen Lee Hung Chan Sang	Rodrigues Movement	115	2.53
Marie Jacqueline Agathe	Rodrigues Movement	102	2.24
Total		9,106	100.00
Valid votes		4,553	97.18
Invalid/blank votes		132	2.82
Total votes		4,685	100.00
Registered voters/turnout		5,979	78.36

Nº6 Grande Montagne
Candidate	Party	Votes	%
Henri Agathe	Rodrigues People's Organisation	2,259	57.79
Louis Daniel Baptiste	Rodrigues People's Organisation	2,109	53.95
James Mason Espiegle	UPR-MIR-MMR	1,733	44.33
Jahïsun Moutien-Raboude	UPR-MIR-MMR	1,624	41.55
Joseph Darsile Perrine	Rodrigues Movement	50	1.28
Marie Clarène Perrine	Rodrigues Movement	43	1.10
Total		7,818	100.00
Valid votes		3,909	96.30
Invalid/blank votes		150	3.70
Total votes		4,059	100.00
Registered voters/turnout		5,248	77.34
