= 2012 Rodrigues Regional Assembly election =

← 2006	5 February 2012	2017 →
- 21 seats in the Rodrigues Regional Assembly; 11 seats needed for a majority
Party	Leader	Vote %	Seats	+/–
OPR		46.78	11	+3
Rodrigues Movement		42.08	8	−2
Rodrigues Patriotic Front		10.67	2	New
This lists parties that won seats. See the complete results below.
Result by constituency
Chief Commissioner before	Chief Commissioner after
Gaëtan Jabeemissar; Rodrigues Movement	Serge Clair; OPR

A Regional Assembly election was held in Rodrigues on 5 February 2012. The Rodrigues People's Organisation won eleven seats and a majority, with the Rodrigues Movement winning eight seats and the Rodrigues Patriotic Front winning two.

== Results ==
Party	List			Constituency			Total seats	+/–
Party	Votes	%	Seats	Votes	%	Seats	Total seats	+/–
Rodrigues People's Organisation	10,230	46.78	3	21,276	48.65	8	11	+3
Rodrigues Movement	9,202	42.08	4	18,700	42.76	4	8	–2
Rodrigues Patriotic Front	2,333	10.67	2	3,655	8.36	0	2	New
Rodrigues Independence Movement	102	0.47	0	103	0.24	0	0	New
Total	21,867	100.00	9	43,734	100.00	12	21	+3
Valid votes	21,867	96.97		21,867	96.97			
Invalid/blank votes	683	3.03		683	3.03			
Total votes	22,550	100.00		22,550	100.00			
Registered voters/turnout	27,776	81.19		27,776	81.19			
Source: OEC, OEC, OEC, OEC

=== By constituency ===
Nº1 La Ferme
Candidate	Party	Votes	%
Gaëtan Jabeemissar	Rodrigues Movement	1,974	54.20
Jennifer Ravina	Rodrigues Movement	1,940	53.27
Joseph Buisson Leopold	Rodrigues People's Organisation	1,457	40.01
Justar Tolbize	Rodrigues People's Organisation	1,438	39.48
Joseph Breget Louis	Rodrigues Patriotic Front	239	6.56
Marie Maryline Legoff	Rodrigues Patriotic Front	220	6.04
Joseph Vivien Roussety	Rodrigues Independence Movement	9	0.25
Marie Rosemary Louis	Rodrigues Independence Movement	7	0.19
Total		7,284	100.00
Valid votes		3,642	96.27
Invalid/blank votes		141	3.73
Total votes		3,783	100.00
Registered voters/turnout		4,629	81.72

Nº2 Marechal
Candidate	Party	Votes	%
Jean Christian Agathe	Rodrigues Movement	1,737	55.83
Jean Daniel Speville	Rodrigues Movement	1,715	55.13
Jean Fernando Augustin	Rodrigues People's Organisation	1,242	39.92
Enrico Lamvohee	Rodrigues People's Organisation	1,169	37.58
John Milazar	Rodrigues Patriotic Front	192	6.17
Clarel Begue	Rodrigues Patriotic Front	167	5.37
Total		6,222	100.00
Valid votes		3,111	96.89
Invalid/blank votes		100	3.11
Total votes		3,211	100.00
Registered voters/turnout		3,982	80.64

Nº3 Saint Gabriel
Candidate	Party	Votes	%
Rose Marie Francette Gaspard-Pierre Louis	Rodrigues People's Organisation	2,160	51.39
Jean Rex Ramdally	Rodrigues People's Organisation	2,119	50.42
Marie Arlette Perrine-Begue	Rodrigues Movement	1,959	46.61
Antomy Prosper	Rodrigues Movement	1,922	45.73
Jean Gerard Prosper	Rodrigues Patriotic Front	112	2.66
Jean Macdonell Milazar	Rodrigues Patriotic Front	110	2.62
Rigobert Bottesoie	Rodrigues Independence Movement	12	0.29
Marie Noelle Pierre	Rodrigues Independence Movement	12	0.29
Total		8,406	100.00
Valid votes		4,203	97.95
Invalid/blank votes		88	2.05
Total votes		4,291	100.00
Registered voters/turnout		5,238	81.92

Nº4 Baie Aux Huitres
Candidate	Party	Votes	%
Simon Pierre Roussety	Rodrigues People's Organisation	1,733	52.25
Jean Richard Payendee	Rodrigues People's Organisation	1,731	52.19
Jovani Etienne	Rodrigues Movement	1,035	31.20
Jean Alex Nancy	Rodrigues Movement	1,019	30.72
Jean Alex Flore	Rodrigues Patriotic Front	565	17.03
John Henderson Raffaut	Rodrigues Patriotic Front	551	16.61
Total		6,634	100.00
Valid votes		3,317	97.67
Invalid/blank votes		79	2.33
Total votes		3,396	100.00
Registered voters/turnout		4,232	80.25

Nº5 Port Mathurin
Candidate	Party	Votes	%
Ismaël Valimamode	Rodrigues People's Organisation	2,030	49.94
Marie Rose de Lima Edouard	Rodrigues People's Organisation	1,959	48.19
Louis Ange Perrine	Rodrigues Movement	1,469	36.14
Marie Therese Clair Brault	Rodrigues Movement	1,390	34.19
Joseph Clarence Perrine	Rodrigues Patriotic Front	634	15.60
André Lélio Roussety	Rodrigues Patriotic Front	624	15.35
Angela Louis	Rodrigues Independence Movement	12	0.30
Louis Moutienne	Rodrigues Independence Movement	12	0.30
Total		8,130	100.00
Valid votes		4,065	96.28
Invalid/blank votes		157	3.72
Total votes		4,222	100.00
Registered voters/turnout		5,189	81.36

Nº6 Grande Montagne
Candidate	Party	Votes	%
Louis Daniel Baptiste	Rodrigues People's Organisation	2,140	60.64
Serge Clair	Rodrigues People's Organisation	2,098	59.45
Marie Lindsay Castel	Rodrigues Movement	1,280	36.27
Marie Annecie Larose	Rodrigues Movement	1,260	35.70
Jean Christophe Edouard	Rodrigues Patriotic Front	127	3.60
René Casimir	Rodrigues Patriotic Front	114	3.23
Richarno Agathe	Rodrigues Independence Movement	24	0.68
Marie Rosinette Hortense	Rodrigues Independence Movement	15	0.43
Total		7,058	100.00
Valid votes		3,529	96.76
Invalid/blank votes		118	3.24
Total votes		3,647	100.00
Registered voters/turnout		4,506	80.94
