= Nirmala =

Nirmala may refer to:

== People ==
- Nirmalamma (1920–2009), Indian Telugu film actress
- Nirmala Bhuria, Indian politician in Madhya Pradesh
- Nirmala Chennappa, Indian Kannada film director, theatre actress and producer
- Nirmala Deshpande (1929–2008), Indian social activist
- Nirmala Devat (born 1961), Mauritian judge and lawyer
- Nirmala Devi (1927–1996), Indian film actress and Hindustani classical vocalist
- Nirmala Devi (wrestler) (born 1984), Indian freestyle wrestler
- Nirmala Erevelles, American academic, professor at the University of Alabama
- Nirmala Gavit, Indian politician in Maharashtra
- Nirmala Govindarajan, Indian writer and journalist
- Nirmala Joshi (1934–2015), Indian Catholic religious sister
- Nirmala Kotalawala (born 1965), Sri Lankan politician
- Kamini Nirmala Mendis, Sri Lankan malariologist
- Nirmala Panta (2004–2018), Nepalese rape victim
- Nirmala Patwardhan (1928–2007), Indian ceramic artist
- Nirmala Samant Prabhavalkar, Indian politician and mayor of Mumbai
- Nirmala Rajasekar, Indian veena player
- Gaveet Nirmala Ramesh, Indian politician in Maharashtra
- Nirmala Rao (born 1959), British academic, vice-chancellor of the Asian University for Women
- Nirmala Visweswara Rao, Indian classical dancer
- Nirmala S Maurya (born 1958), Indian academic, vice-chancellor of Veer Bahadur Singh Purvanchal University
- Nirmala Sankhwar (born 1969), Indian politician in Uttar Pradesh
- Nirmala Sheoran (born 1995), Indian sprinter
- Nirmala Sitharaman (born 1959), Indian Minister of Finance and Corporate Affairs
- Nirmala Srivastava (1923–2011), founder and guru of Sahaja Yoga
- Nirmala Wadhwani, Indian politician in Gujarat
- Sant Nirmala (fl. 14th century), Maharashtrian sant, sister of Chokhamela
- Sellappan Nirmala (born 1952/53), Indian doctor who discovered the first HIV case in India
- Vennira Aadai Nirmala (born 1948), Indian Tamil, Malayalam and Telugu film actress
- Vijaya Nirmala (born 1946), Indian Telugu film actress and director

== Others ==
- Nirmala (novel), a 1926 novel by Munshi Premchand
- Nirmala (1938 film), an Indian social drama film by Franz Osten
- Nirmala (1948 film), an Indian social drama film by P. V. Krishna Iyer
- Nirmala (sect), a Sikh religious order
- Nirmala (beetle), a genus of beetles in the family Carabidae
- Nirmala UI, an Indic writing system font on Microsoft Windows
- Nirmala Bhavan Higher Secondary School, a Catholic private school in Thiruvananthapuram, Kerala, India
- Nirmala, a fictional character from the TV series The Lion Guard

== See also ==
- Nirmal (disambiguation)
