= Chief Commissioner of Rodrigues =

- Chef Commissaire
- Flag of Rodrigues

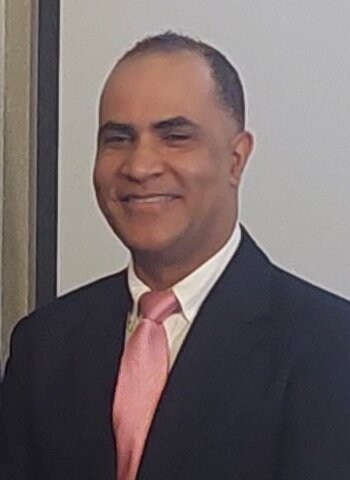
- Incumbent; Franceau Grandcourt since 6 March 2024
- Nominator: Leader of the largest party in the Regional Assembly
- Appointer: President of Mauritius
- Term length: 5 years or earlier, renewable
- Inaugural holder: Jean Daniel Spéville
- Formation: 10 December 2002; 23 years ago
- Deputy: Deputy Chief Commissioner

The chief commissioner of Rodrigues (French: chef commissaire de Rodrigues) is the gubernatorial head of the region of Rodrigues since it gained autonomy within the Republic of Mauritius on 12 October 2002. The commissioner is selected from the party holding the majority of seats at the regional assembly.

== Overview ==
=== Responsibilities ===
Since 5 March 2012, the chief commissioner Johnson Roussety was assigned the following responsibilities.

- Central Administration
- Civil Aviation (Administration)
- Civil Status
- Customs and Excise (Administration)
- Judicial (Administration)
- Legal Services
- Marine Services (Administration)
- Meteorology (Administration)
- Education (Administration)
- Arts and Culture
- Historical sites and Buildings
- State Lands
- Town and Country Planning
- Fire Services
- Prisons and Reform Institutions (Administration)
- Cooperatives
- Agriculture
- Food Production
- Plant and Animal Quarantine
- Statistics in respect of Rodrigues
- Registration
- Postal Services (Administration)

== List of chief commissioners ==
No.	Portrait	Name	Election	Tenure			Party
No.	Portrait	Name	Election	Took office	Left office	Time in office	Party
1		Jean Daniel Spéville	2002	12 October 2002	4 February 2003	115 days	OPR
2		Serge Clair	2002	4 February 2003	4 August 2006	3 years, 181 days	OPR
3		Johnson Roussety	2002	4 August 2006	10 December 2006	4 years, 161 days	MR
3		Johnson Roussety	2006	10 December 2006	12 January 2011	4 years, 161 days	MR
4		Gaëtan Jabeemissar	2006	12 January 2011	11 February 2012	1 year, 30 days	MR
(2)		Serge Clair	2012	11 February 2012	12 February 2017	10 years, 22 days	OPR
(2)		Serge Clair	2017	12 February 2012	5 March 2022	10 years, 22 days	OPR
(3)		Johnson Roussety	2022	5 March 2022	6 March 2024	2 years, 1 day	FPR
5		Franceau Grandcourt	2022	6 March 2024	Incumbent	2 years, 185 days	UPR

== See also ==
- Chief Executive of Rodrigues
- Politics of Mauritius
