= 2017 Rodrigues Regional Assembly election =

Local election in Mauritius

- 12 February 2017
- 17 seats in the Rodrigues Regional Assembly; 9 seats needed for a majority
Party	Leader	Vote %	Seats	+/–
OPR		56.07	10	−1
MR		42.05	7	−1
This lists parties that won seats. See the complete results below.
Result by constituency
Chief Commissioner before	Chief Commissioner after
Serge Clair; OPR	Serge Clair; OPR

Elections for the Rodrigues Regional Assembly were held on 12 February 2017. They were the fourth election of the island's regional parliament since Rodrigues obtained autonomous status within the Republic of Mauritius in 2001. The Rodrigues People's Organisation won 10 of the 17 seats.

== Results ==
Party	List			Constituency			Total seats	+/–
Party	Votes	%	Seats	Votes	%	Seats	Total seats	+/–
Rodrigues People's Organisation	12,386	56.07	0	25,247	57.14	10	10	–1
Rodrigues Movement	9,289	42.05	5	18,654	42.22	2	7	–1
Rodrigues Independence Movement	416	1.88	0	281	0.64	0	0	0
Total	22,091	100.00	5	44,182	100.00	12	17	–4
Valid votes	22,091	95.70		22,091	95.70			
Invalid/blank votes	992	4.30		992	4.30			
Total votes	23,083	100.00		23,083	100.00			
Registered voters/turnout	28,791	80.17		28,791	80.17			

=== By constituency ===
Nº1 La Ferme
Candidate	Party	Votes	%
Franceau Aubret Grandcourt	Rodrigues Movement	1,897	50.91
Jean Nicolas Volbert	Rodrigues Movement	1,864	50.03
Joseph Christian Félicité	Rodrigues People's Organisation	1,792	48.09
Marie Pricie Anjela Speville	Rodrigues People's Organisation	1,772	47.56
Yvan Ithier	Rodrigues Independence Movement	76	2.04
Marie Rose Wilhelmine Meunier	Rodrigues Independence Movement	51	1.37
Total		7,452	100.00
Valid votes		3,726	95.44
Invalid/blank votes		178	4.56
Total votes		3,904	100.00
Registered voters/turnout		4,878	80.03

Nº2 Marechal
Candidate	Party	Votes	%
Marie Roxana Collet	Rodrigues People's Organisation	1,575	51.66
Jean Noël Nemours	Rodrigues People's Organisation	1,567	51.39
Gaëtan Jabeemissar	Rodrigues Movement	1,453	47.65
Coumar Ramdally	Rodrigues Movement	1,426	46.77
Jean Christian Bégué	Rodrigues Independence Movement	44	1.44
James Bégué	Rodrigues Independence Movement	33	1.08
Total		6,098	100.00
Valid votes		3,049	92.93
Invalid/blank votes		232	7.07
Total votes		3,281	100.00
Registered voters/turnout		4,093	80.16

Nº3 Saint Gabriel
Candidate	Party	Votes	%
Rose Marie Gaspard Pierre Louis	Rodrigues People's Organisation	2,703	61.83
Jean Rex Ramdally	Rodrigues People's Organisation	2,699	61.73
Joseph Chenlye Lamvohee	Rodrigues Movement	1,674	38.29
Jean Robert Speville	Rodrigues Movement	1,668	38.15
Total		8,744	100.00
Valid votes		4,372	96.47
Invalid/blank votes		160	3.53
Total votes		4,532	100.00
Registered voters/turnout		5,445	83.23

Nº4 Baie Aux Huitres
Candidate	Party	Votes	%
Nicolson Lisette	Rodrigues People's Organisation	2,038	63.71
Simon Pierre Roussety	Rodrigues People's Organisation	1,957	61.18
Marie Jana Perrine	Rodrigues Movement	1,208	37.76
Marie Jenny Emanuella Auguste	Rodrigues Movement	1,195	37.36
Total		6,398	100.00
Valid votes		3,199	96.30
Invalid/blank votes		123	3.70
Total votes		3,322	100.00
Registered voters/turnout		4,257	78.04

Nº5 Port Mathurin
Candidate	Party	Votes	%
Jean Richard Payendee	Rodrigues People's Organisation	2,201	53.19
Marie Rose De Lima Edouard	Rodrigues People's Organisation	2,185	52.80
Johnson Roussety	Rodrigues Movement	1,924	46.50
Louis Ange Perrine	Rodrigues Movement	1,889	45.65
Marie Rosanne André	Rodrigues Independence Movement	45	1.09
Jocelin Louis	Rodrigues Independence Movement	32	0.77
Total		8,276	100.00
Valid votes		4,138	96.46
Invalid/blank votes		152	3.54
Total votes		4,290	100.00
Registered voters/turnout		5,380	79.74

Nº6 Grande Montagne
Candidate	Party	Votes	%
Louis Daniel Baptiste	Rodrigues People's Organisation	2,407	66.73
Serge Clair	Rodrigues People's Organisation	2,351	65.18
Marylou Augustin	Rodrigues Movement	1,252	34.71
Marie Débora Ah-Chine Roberts	Rodrigues Movement	1,204	33.38
Total		7,214	100.00
Valid votes		3,607	96.08
Invalid/blank votes		147	3.92
Total votes		3,754	100.00
Registered voters/turnout		4,738	79.23
