= List of Telugu films of 1979 =

This is a list of films produced by the Tollywood (Telugu language film industry) based in Hyderabad in the year 1979.

Title	Director	Cast	Music	Notes
Akbar Salim Anarkali	N. T. Rama Rao	N. T. Rama Rao, Nandamuri Balakrishna, Deepa, Jamuna	C. Ramchandra	
Andadu Aagadu	S. D. Lal	Krishnam Raju, Latha Sethupathi	Satyam	
Andamaina Anubhavam	K. Balachandar	Rajinikanth, Kamal Haasan, Jaya Prada, Jayasudha	Rajan–Nagendra	
Andaman Ammayi	V. Madhusudhana Rao	Akkineni Nageswara Rao, Vanisri	K. V. Mahadevan	
Amma Evarikaina Amma	R. Thyagarajan	Rajinikanth	Ilaiyaraaja	
Bangaru Chellelu	B. Subba Rao	Sobhan Babu, Jayasudha, Sridevi, Murali Mohan	K. V. Mahadevan	
Burripalem Bullodu	Bheeram Mastan Rao	Krishna, Sridevi, Pandari Bai	Chakravarthy	
Driver Ramudu	K. Raghavendra Rao	N. T. Rama Rao, Jayasudha, Kaikala Satyanarayana, Jayamalini	Chakravarthy	
Gorintaku	Dasari Narayana Rao	Shoban Babu, Sujatha	K. V. Mahadevan	
Guppedu Manasu	K. Balachandar	Sarath Babu, Saritha, Sujatha	M. S. Viswanathan	Simultaneously released in Tamil as Nool Veli
Hema Hemeelu	Vijaya Nirmala	ANR, Krishna, Vijaya Nirmala	Ramesh Naidu	
I Love You	Vayu Nandana Rao	Chiranjeevi, Suvarna, Prasad Babu	Satyam	
Iddaru Asadhyule	K. S. R. Das	Krishna, Rajinikanth, Madhavi, Geetha	Satyam	
Intinti Ramayanam	P. Sambasiva Rao	Chandramohan, Jayasudha Ranganath and Prabha		
Idi Katha Kaadu	K. Balachandar	Kamal Haasan, Jayasudha, Saritha, Chiranjeevi, Sarath Babu, Rama Prabha	M. S. Viswanathan	
Judagadu	V. Madhusudhana Rao	Sobhan Babu, Jayasudha	Chakravarthy	
Kalyani	Dasari Narayana Rao	Jayasudha, Murali Mohan, Mohan Babu	Ramesh Naidu	
Kaliyuga Mahabharatam	V. Hanuman Prasad	Narasimha Raju, Madhavi, Nutan Prasad	Satyam	
Karthika Deepam	Lakshmi Deepak	Sobhan Babu, Sridevi, Saradha, Geetha, Leelavathi	Satyam	
Korikale Gurralaite	Dasari Narayana Rao	Murali Mohan, Chandra Mohan, Fatafat Jayalakshmi, Prabha	Satyam	
Kothala Raayudu	K. Vasu	Chiranjeevi, Madhavi	J. V. Raghavulu	
Kotta Alludu	P. Sambasiva Rao	Krishna, Jaya Prada, Chiranjeevi, Hema Choudhary, Mohan Babu	K. V. Mahadevan	
Kukka Katuku Cheppu Debba	Eeranki Sharma	Chiranjeevi, Madhavi	M. S. Viswanathan	
Maavari Manchitanam	B. A. Subba Rao	NTR, Vanisri	Master Venu	
Mande Gundelu	K. Bapaiah	Krishna, Shoban Babu, Chandra Mohan, Jayaprada, Jayasudha, Anjali Devi	K. V. Mahadevan	
Muddula Koduku	V. B. Rajendra Prasad	ANR, Sridevi, Jayasudha	K. V. Mahadevan	
Naa Illu Naa Vallu	Raja Chandra	Giribabu, Gummadi, Sreedhar, Murali Mohan, Nutan Prasad, Rama Prabha	J. V. Raghavulu	
Nagna Sathyam	U. Viswesar Rao	Ramprasad, Krishnaveni		
Needa	Dasari Narayana Rao	Ramesh Babu, Master Mahesh	Ramesh Naidu	
Nimajjanam	B. S. Narayana	Sharada, Chakrapani	M. B. Sreenivasan	
Nindu Noorellu	K. Raghavendra Rao	Mohan Babu, Jayasudha, Chandra Mohan	Chakravarthy	
Pancha Bhoothalu	P. C. Reddy		Ilaiyaraaja	
Punadhirallu	Rajkumar	Chiranjeevi, Roja Ramani, Savitri, Narasimharaju	Premji Amaran	
Rama Banam	Y. Eshwara Reddy	Sobhan Babu, Krishnam Raju, Mohan Babu, Jayaprada, Jamuna, Latha	Satyam	
Rangoon Rowdy	Dasari Narayana Rao	Krishnam Raju, Jaya Prada, Mohan Babu, Deepa	J. V. Raghavulu	
Ravanude Ramudayithe?	Dasari Narayana Rao	ANR, Murali Mohan, Mohan Babu, Latha, Jayachitra	G. K. Venkatesh	
Shri Rama Bantu	S. D. Lal	Chiranjeevi, Geetha, Mohan Babu	Satyam	
Sri Madvirata Parvam	N. T. Rama Rao	N. T. Rama Rao, Nandamuri Balakrishna, Vanisri	Susarla Dakshinamurthi	
Sri Tirupati Venkateswara Kalyanam	N. T. Rama Rao	NTR, Jaya Prada, Jayasudha	Pendyala Nageswara Rao	
Sri Vinayaka Vijayamu	Kamalakara Kameswara Rao	Uppalapati Krishnam Raju, Rama Krishna, Vanisri	S. Rajeswara Rao	
Srungara Ramudu	K. Shankar	N. T. Rama Rao, Latha, Sarath Babu	K. V. Mahadevan	
Tayaramma Bangarayya	Kommineni Seshagiri Rao	Sowkar Janaki, Chiranjeevi, Madhavi, Kaikala Satyanarayana, Chandra Mohan, Ranganath, Sangeetha	K. V. Mahadevan	
Tiger	Nandamuri Ramesh	N. T. Rama Rao, Rajinikanth, Radha Saluja, Subhashini	Satyam	
Toorpu Velle Railu	Bapu	Jyothi, Mohan	S. P. Balasubrahmanyam	
Vetagaadu	K. Raghavendra Rao	N. T. Rama Rao, Sridevi, Rao Gopala Rao, Kaikala Satyanarayana, Allu Ramalingaiah, Pandari Bai	Chakravarthy	
Yugandhar	K. S. R. Das	N. T. Rama Rao, Jayasudha	Ilaiyaraaja	
