= 2002 Rodrigues Regional Assembly election =

29 September 2002	2006 →
- 18 seats in the Rodrigues Regional Assembly; 10 seats needed for a majority
Party	Leader	Vote %	Seats
OPR			10
Rodrigues Movement			8
This lists parties that won seats. See the complete results below.
Result by constituency
Chief Commissioner after
Jean Daniel Spéville; OPR

Elections for the Rodrigues Regional Assembly were held on 29 September 2002. They were the first election of the island's regional parliament since Rodrigues obtained autonomous status within the Republic of Mauritius in 2001.

== Results ==
Party	List			Constituency			Total seats
Party	Votes	%	Seats	Votes	%	Seats	Total seats
Rodrigues People's Organisation	10,874	54.97	2	21,969	55.52	8	10
Rodrigues Movement	8,617	43.56	4	17,427	44.05	4	8
Movement Socialiste Rodriguais	177	0.89	0	98	0.25	0	0
Ralliement des Rodriguais Responsables	115	0.58	0	55	0.14	0	0
Independent				17	0.04	0	0
Total	19,783	100.00	6	39,566	100.00	12	18
Valid votes	19,783	98.45					
Invalid/blank votes	311	1.55					
Total votes	20,094	100.00					
Registered voters/turnout	27,778	72.34					

=== By constituency ===
Nº1 La Ferme
Candidate	Party	Votes	%
Franceau Aubret Grandcourt	Rodrigues Movement	1,856	29.00
Gaëtan Jabeemissar	Rodrigues Movement	1,850	28.91
Louis Serge Clair	Rodrigues People's Organisation	1,358	21.22
Marie Jenny Ah Song	Rodrigues People's Organisation	1,336	20.88
Total		6,400	100.00

Nº2 Marechal
Candidate	Party	Votes	%
Joseph Allan Ladd Emilien	Rodrigues Movement	1,580	27.85
Jean Christian Agathe	Rodrigues Movement	1,565	27.58
Enrico Lamvohee	Rodrigues People's Organisation	1,273	22.44
Jean Stephen Swee	Rodrigues People's Organisation	1,256	22.14
Total		5,674	100.00

Nº3 Saint Gabriel
Candidate	Party	Votes	%
Jean Daniel Speville	Rodrigues People's Organisation	2,204	30.07
Marie Arlette Perrine-Begue	Rodrigues People's Organisation	2,166	29.55
Vinolia Ramanitrarivo	Rodrigues Movement	1,491	20.34
Joseph Antonio Volbert	Rodrigues Movement	1,469	20.04
Total		7,330	100.00

Nº4 Baie Aux Huitres
Candidate	Party	Votes	%
Louis Philippe Francois	Rodrigues People's Organisation	2,003	31.16
Nicolson Lisette	Rodrigues People's Organisation	1,994	31.02
Marie Christmede Meunier	Rodrigues Movement	1,206	18.76
Antonio Leong Lone	Rodrigues Movement	1,193	18.56
Kennel Begue	Independent	17	0.26
Jacques Desire Franco Zephir	Ralliement des Rodriguais Responsables	15	0.23
Total		6,428	100.00

Nº5 Port Mathurin
Candidate	Party	Votes	%
Andre Lelio Roussety	Rodrigues People's Organisation	2,010	28.10
Soopramanien Sooprayen	Rodrigues People's Organisation	1,995	27.89
Marie Desiree Lordana Chan Meunier	Rodrigues Movement	1,580	22.09
Yong She Yan Wallis Yong Yan Yin	Rodrigues Movement	1,527	21.35
Jacques Desire Castel	Ralliement des Rodriguais Responsables	40	0.56
Total		7,152	100.00

Nº6 Grande Montagne
Candidate	Party	Votes	%
Robertson Mercure	Rodrigues People's Organisation	2,200	33.42
Jean Robert Speville	Rodrigues People's Organisation	2,174	33.03
Jean Decanty Espiegle	Rodrigues Movement	1,079	16.39
Joseph Rujobert Francois	Rodrigues Movement	1,031	15.66
Benjamin Edouard	Mouvement Socialiste Rodriguais	53	0.81
Jean Laval Plaiche	Mouvement Socialiste Rodriguais	45	0.68
Total		6,582	100.00
