= Marie Roxana Collet =

Mauritian politician

MP for Rodrigues
- Incumbent
- Assumed office 29 November 2024

Personal details
- Party: Rodrigues People's Organisation

Marie Roxana Collet is a Mauritian politician from the Rodrigues People's Organisation. She was elected a member of the National Assembly of Mauritius in 2024. She represents Rodrigues. She is a laureate of Rodrigues College. She was elected to the Rodrigues Regional Assembly in 2017 but was defeated in 2022.
