= Intinti Ramayanam (1979 film) =

- Directed by: P. Sambasiva Rao
- Written by: Story: Navatha; Screenplay: Navatha; Dialogue: Jandhyala
- Produced by: N. Krishnam Raju
- Cinematography: N. A. Thara
- Edited by: D. Vasu
- Music by: Rajan–Nagendra
- Production company: Navatha Arts
- Release date: 23 June 1979
- Country: India
- Language: Telugu

Intinti Ramayanam is a 1979 Indian Telugu-language drama film directed by P. Sambasiva Rao and produced by N. Krishnam Raju under the banner of Navatha Arts. The film is known for its social satire and family-oriented narrative, with dialogues written by Jandhyala. It stars Chandramohan, Jayasudha, Ranganath and Prabha in the lead roles. The title metaphorically suggests that every household experiences conflicts similar to those depicted in the epic Ramayana.

The film was released on 23 June 1979 and later came to be regarded as a notable example of Telugu middle-class family dramas of the late 1970s.

== Plot ==
The story centers on a soft-spoken and principled man portrayed by Chandramohan, who attempts to balance family responsibilities, personal values, and social expectations. His wife, played by Jayasudha, is portrayed as practical and emotionally grounded, acting as the stabilizing force within the household.

The narrative unfolds through interactions with relatives and neighbors, whose differing personalities and opinions escalate minor disagreements into major disputes. Characters portrayed by Gummadi Venkateswara Rao, Ramaprabha, Nutan Prasad, and Nirmala represent familiar archetypes found in many Indian families, such as tradition-bound elders, outspoken relatives, and opportunistic family members.

Through a blend of humor and drama, the film highlights how pride, ego, and miscommunication can disrupt domestic harmony. The conflicts are eventually resolved through understanding and compromise, reinforcing the idea that harmony within a family depends on empathy and mutual respect.

== Cast ==
- Chandramohan
- Jayasudha
- Ranganath
- Prabha
- Nutan Prasad
- Ramaprabha
- Gummadi Venkateswara Rao
- Nirmala
- P. L. Narayana
- Athili Lakshmi
- Anand Mohan
- Srilakshmi
- Kalpana Rai
- Jayalatha
- Chalapathi Rao
- Chidatala Apparao
- Vanga Apparao
- Sathibabu
- Dhum

== Music ==
The soundtrack was composed by the duo Rajan–Nagendra. The songs were rendered by prominent playback singers P. Susheela, S. Janaki, and S. P. Balasubrahmanyam. The lyrics, written by Arudra, Veturi Sundararama Murthy, Kopalle Sivaram, and M. V. L., complemented the film's domestic and emotional themes.

== Production ==
Intinti Ramayanam was produced by Navatha Arts with the intention of portraying contemporary middle-class family life. Cinematography by N. A. Thara focused on intimate domestic settings, while editing by D. Vasu ensured a smooth narrative flow. Art direction was handled by Kaladhar Surapaneni, reflecting the aesthetics of Telugu households during the period.

== Reception and legacy ==
At the time of its release, the film received appreciation for its relatable subject matter, natural performances, and effective dialogue. Over the years, it has gained recognition as a classic Telugu family drama. In 2019, the film completed 40 years since its release, reaffirming its continued cultural relevance.

== See also ==
- Intinti Ramayanam (2023 film)
- Intinti Ramayanam (television series)
