= 2006 Rodrigues Regional Assembly election =

- 10 December 2006
- 18 seats in the Rodrigues Regional Assembly; 10 seats needed for a majority
Party	Leader	Vote %	Seats	+/–
MR			10	+2
OPR			8	−2
This lists parties that won seats. See the complete results below.
Result by constituency
Chief Commissioner before	Chief Commissioner after
Johnson Roussety; MR	Johnson Roussety; MR

Elections for the Rodrigues Regional Assembly were held on 10 December 2006. They were the second election of the island's regional parliament since Rodrigues obtained autonomous status within the Republic of Mauritius in 2001.

== Results ==
Party	List			Constituency			Total seats
Party	Votes	%	Seats	Votes	%	Seats	Total seats
Rodrigues Movement	11,118	53.41	4	22,313	53.60	6	10
Rodrigues People's Organisation	9,484	45.56	2	19,062	45.79	6	8
Front Progressiste du Peuple de Rodrigues	123	0.59	0	136	0.33	0	0
Regroupement Travailleur Rodriguais	90	0.43	0	103	0.25	0	0
Independents				16	0.04	0	0
Total	20,815	100.00	6	41,630	100.00	12	18
Valid votes	20,815	98.39					
Invalid/blank votes	340	1.61					
Total votes	21,155	100.00					
Registered voters/turnout	24,682	85.71					

=== By constituency ===
Nº1 La Ferme
Candidate	Party	Votes	%
Franceau Aubret Grandcourt	Rodrigues Movement	2,226	33.07
Gaëtan Jabeemissar	Rodrigues Movement	2,217	32.93
Marie Jenny Ah-Song	Rodrigues People's Organisation	1,132	16.82
Enrico Lamvohee	Rodrigues People's Organisation	1,125	16.71
Jean Clifford Emilien	Regroupement Travailleur Rodriguais	13	0.19
Jean Miol Potiron	Regroupement Travailleur Rodriguais	11	0.16
Steeve Prudence	Front Progressiste du Peuple de Rodrigues	8	0.12
Total		6,732	100.00

Nº2 Marechal
Candidate	Party	Votes	%
Jean Christian Agathe	Rodrigues Movement	2,011	33.21
Joseph Allan Ladd Emilien	Rodrigues Movement	1,935	31.95
John Milazar	Rodrigues People's Organisation	1,039	17.16
Jean Noel Nemours	Rodrigues People's Organisation	972	16.05
Jean Philippe Augustin	Front Progressiste du Peuple de Rodrigues	52	0.86
Jean Mariol Potiron	Regroupement Travailleur Rodriguais	24	0.40
Joseph Stevenson Speville	Regroupement Travailleur Rodriguais	23	0.38
Total		6,056	100.00

Nº3 Saint Gabriel
Candidate	Party	Votes	%
Marie Arlette Perrine-Bégué	Rodrigues People's Organisation	1,970	25.32
Jean Daniel Speville	Rodrigues People's Organisation	1,927	24.77
Antomy Prosper	Rodrigues Movement	1,916	24.63
William Auguste	Rodrigues Movement	1,906	24.50
Joseph Antoine Benette St Martin	Front Progressiste du Peuple de Rodrigues	29	0.37
Joseph Claris Zameer	Regroupement Travailleur Rodriguais	19	0.24
Jean Eric Volbert	Regroupement Travailleur Rodriguais	13	0.17
Total		7,780	100.00

Nº4 Baie Aux Huitres
Candidate	Party	Votes	%
Nicolson Lisette	Rodrigues People's Organisation	1,719	26.08
Louis Philippe François	Rodrigues People's Organisation	1,703	25.83
Jovani Etienne	Rodrigues Movement	1,585	24.04
Joseph Louis Rosaire Perrine	Rodrigues Movement	1,565	23.74
Gerard Patrick Nanette	Front Progressiste du Peuple de Rodrigues	20	0.30
Total		6,592	100.00

Nº5 Port Mathurin
Candidate	Party	Votes	%
Johnson Roussety	Rodrigues Movement	2,039	26.84
Louis Ange Perrine	Rodrigues Movement	1,999	26.31
Jean Francisco François	Rodrigues People's Organisation	1,774	23.35
Jean Richard Payendee	Rodrigues People's Organisation	1,750	23.03
Joseph Reddy Augustin	Front Progressiste du Peuple de Rodrigues	20	0.26
Marie Rodilia Gaspard	Independent	11	0.14
Jean Margeot Jolicoeur	Independent	5	0.07
Total		7,598	100.00

Nº6 Grande Montagne
Candidate	Party	Votes	%
Rose Marie Franchette Gaspard Pierre Louis	Rodrigues People's Organisation	1,977	28.77
Louis Daniel Baptiste	Rodrigues People's Organisation	1,974	28.73
Marie Lindsay Castel	Rodrigues Movement	1,468	21.36
Robertson Mercure	Rodrigues Movement	1,446	21.04
Joseph Ricaud	Front Progressiste du Peuple de Rodrigues	7	0.10
Total		6,872	100.00
