= Ariranga Pillay =

Chief Justice of Mauritius from 1996 to 2007

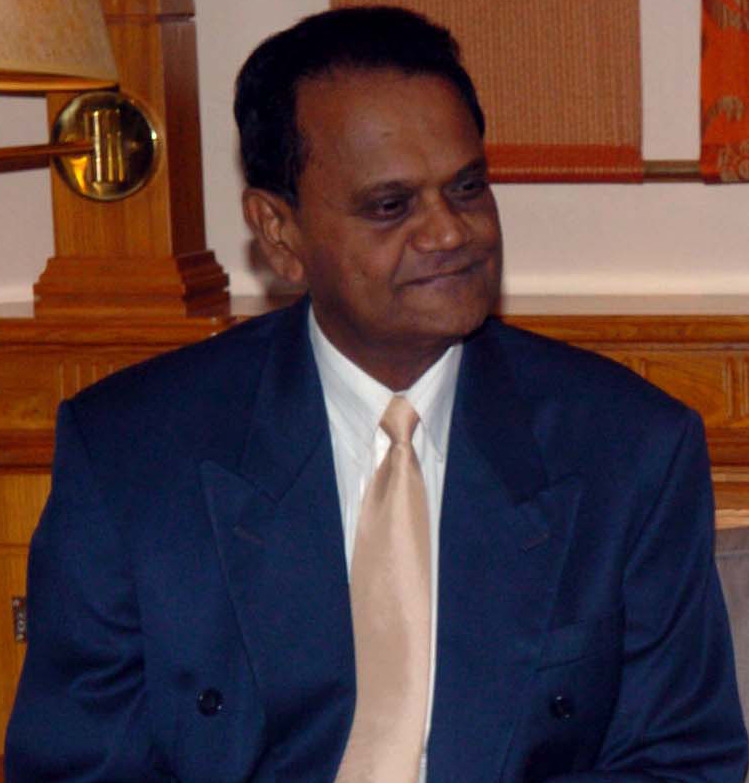
Ariranga Pillay in 2005.

Ariranga Govindasamy Pillay (Tamil: அரி ரங்க கோவிந்தசாமி பிள்ளை; 14 June 1945 — 5 January 2023) was the chief justice of Mauritius from 1996 until 2007, when he was succeeded by Y. K. J. Yeung Sik Yuen.

== Early life ==
He studied economics and political science at the London School of Economics and Political Science from 1966 to 1969, gaining a BSc (econ) degree, after which he studied law at Merton College, Oxford, graduating in 1971 with a BA in jurisprudence. He was called to the bar at Lincoln's Inn, London in 1972. On his return to Mauritius he practised law and worked as a legal adviser to the Attorney General's Office and Ministry of Justice in Mauritius until 1987. He held numerous appointments, among others Principal Crown Counsel, Assistant Solicitor General and Parliamentary Counsel at the attorney general's office and Ministry of Justice.

He was appointed puisne judge and later, acting senior puisne judge of the Supreme Court of Mauritius from 1987 to 1996. On 1 May 1996 he was appointed the chief justice of Mauritius, retiring on 13 June 2007. In November 2001, he was elected as an honorary bencher of Lincoln's Inn.

After the resignation of Angidi Chettiar he became acting president of Mauritius from 18 February 2002 until 25 February 2002, when Karl Offmann was elected to this office.

He is the chairman of the Judicial and Legal Service Commission of Mauritius. He is also a member of the United Nations Committee on Economic, Social and Cultural Rights since 1997 as well as the appointed adviser to the governing council of the African Centre for Democracy and Human Rights Studies.
