= Judiciary of Mauritius =

The Judiciary of Mauritius is responsible for the administration of justice in Mauritius and has as mission to maintain an independent and competent judicial system which upholds the rule of law, safeguards the rights and freedom of the individual and commands domestic and international confidence. The Constitution provides for the institution of an independent judiciary which is based on the concept of separation of powers. Mauritius has a single-structured judicial system consisting of two parts, the Supreme Court and the Subordinate Courts. The Subordinate Courts consist of the Court of Rodrigues, the Intermediate Court, the Industrial Court, the District Courts, the Bail and Remand Court, the Criminal and Mediation Court and the Commercial Court. The Chief Justice is head of the judiciary. The Constitution of Mauritius is the supreme legal document of the country. The final appeal from decisions of the Court of Appeal of Mauritius to the Judicial Committee of the Privy council in London as provided for under the Constitution of Mauritius.

As of 2014, a total of 8,594 cases were pending before the Supreme Court of Mauritius. The number of cases before the case decreased by 1 per cent in 2014 compared to 2013, while the number of cases disposed increased by 32 per cent. As much of 42 per cent of cases in district courts were from urban areas, while the Division III of District Court of Port Louis disposed most number of cases in 2014 among all district courts.

== History ==
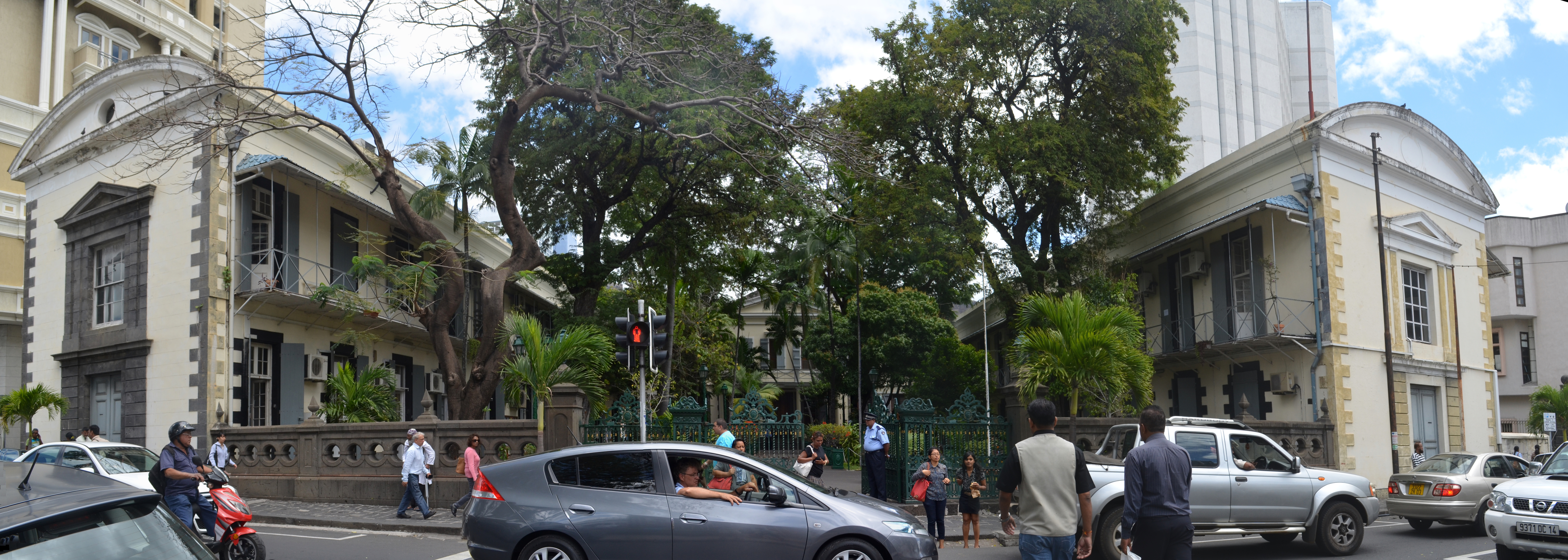
Supreme Court building in Port Louis

The modern system of law in Mauritius is an amalgamation of French civil law and common law, while the civil and criminal proceedings are modelled based on British practice. The civil aspects governing the Mauritian Legal System are namely; contract law, société, civil rights, property law and the civil procedure. Supreme Court is established as the highest court of justice and lower courts of namely, the Criminal Court of Procedure and the Civil Court of Procedure. The official language used in the Supreme Court is English.

In 1507 Portuguese sailors came to the uninhabited island and established a visiting base. Diogo Fernandes Pereira, a Portuguese navigator, was the first European known to land in Mauritius and named the island "Ilha do Cirne". The Portuguese did not stay long and did not establish any formal system of Judicial administration. In 1598 a Dutch squadron under Admiral Wybrand Van Warwyck landed at Grand Port and named the island "Mauritius" after Prince Maurice van Nassau of the Dutch Republic, the ruler of his country. France, which already controlled neighbouring Île Bourbon (now Réunion), took control of Mauritius in 1715 and renamed it Isle de France. From 1767 to 1810, except for a brief period during the French Revolution when the inhabitants set up a government virtually independent of France, the island was controlled by officials appointed by the French Government. A Penal Code was published in 1791 and adopted by the Colonial Assembly in 1793, while a separate civil code was promulgated on 3 September 1807. The Supreme Court was established as a supreme body composed of the Prime minister, President, three judges, four clerks and a government commissioner where appeal from neighbouring Seychelles was also allowed.

Despite winning the Battle of Grand Port, the only French naval victory over the British during these wars, the French could not prevent the British from landing at Cap Malheureux during 1810. They formally surrendered the island on the fifth day of the invasion, 3 December 1810, on terms allowing settlers to keep their land and property and to use the French language and law of France in criminal and civil matters. Under British rule, the island's name reverted to Mauritius. The British rule established a two tier system where the justice can have a higher appeal in Majesty's council. By 1851, after many changes in the judicial administration laws, Supreme Court was established as the body of appeal, making it again a single tiered jurisdiction. A bail court was later established with a judge of the Supreme court with a right to appeal, making it a two-tiered system.

The island of Rodrigues has enjoyed higher autonomy as it maintains a separate regional assembly and a court of its own.

== Structure ==
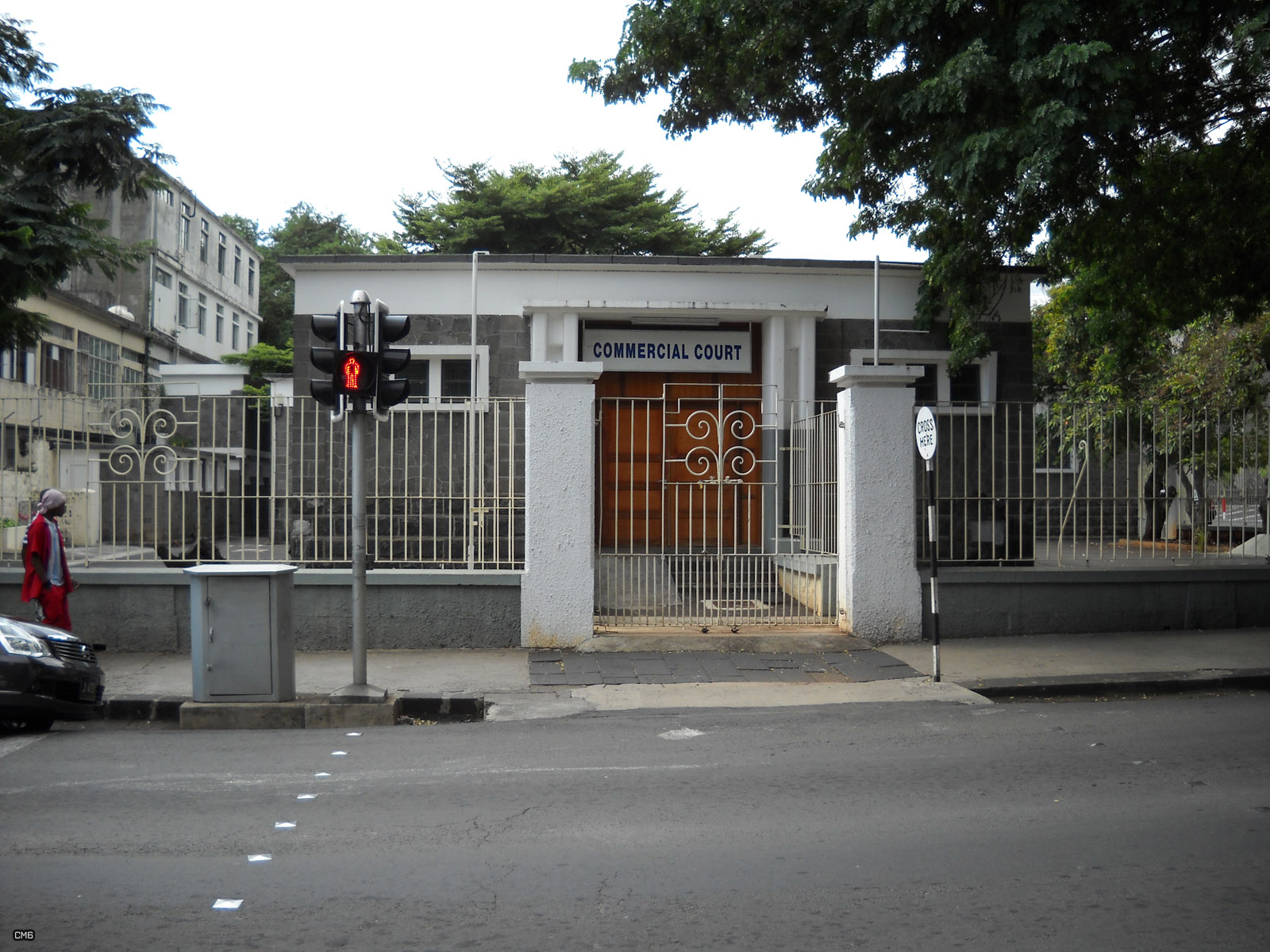
Commercial Court

The Judiciary of Mauritius is considered one of the three principal bodies of Mauritian democracy along with the legal and executive. It is an independent and competent judicial system which upholds the rule of law, safeguards the rights and freedom of the individual and commands domestic and international confidence. The Constitution provides for the institution of an independent judiciary which is based on the concept of separation of powers. Mauritius has a single-structured judicial system consisting of two parts, the Supreme Court and the Subordinate Courts. The Subordinate Courts consist of the Court of Rodrigues, the Intermediate Court, the Industrial Court, the District Courts, the Bail and Remand Court, the Criminal and Mediation Court and the Commercial Court. The Chief Justice is head of the judiciary. The Constitution of Mauritius is the supreme legal document of the country. The final appeal from decisions of the Court of Appeal of Mauritius to the Judicial Committee of the Privy council in London is provided for under the Constitution of Mauritius.

== Statistics ==
As of 2014, a total of 8,594 cases were pending before the Supreme Court of Mauritius. The number of pending cases decreased by 1 per cent in 2014 compared to 2013, while the number of cases disposed increased by 32 per cent. The number of criminal offences convicted before the Criminal Division of the Supreme Court increased by 8 per cent in 2014. There were three sodomy and twelve convictions in drug related cases in 2014. The number of cases reduced in Intermediate courts by 5 per cent on account of decrease of criminal cases by 21 per cent and increase in number of civil cases by 5 per cent. The number of cases in Industrial court increased by 9 per cent as there was 39 per cent increase in criminal cases and a marginal increase in civil cases. As much as 42 per cent of cases in district courts were from urban areas, while the Division III of District Court of Port Louis disposed the highest number of cases in 2014 among all district courts.

Number of cases before Supreme Court of Mauritius
Type	2007	2008	2009	2010	2011	2012	2013	2014
Supreme court - cases pending at the beginning of the year	10,858	11,846	12,704	9,380	9,439	9,145	8,744	10,023
Supreme court - cases lodged	7,589	7,244	7,612	9,234	9,161	9,253	9,617	9,483
Supreme court - cases disposed	6,601	5,920	8,062	8,781	8,459	8,468	8,338	10,912
Supreme court - cases outstanding at the end of the year	11,846	12,694	9,380	9,439	9,145	8,933	10,023	8,594
Intermediate court - cases pending at the beginning of the year	4,699	4,014	3,836	4,255	4,830	3,887	5,997	6,413
Intermediate court - cases lodged	3,537	3,465	3,638	4,128	4,065	3,837	3,924	3,341
Intermediate court - cases disposed	3,910	3,643	3,219	3,553	3,442	3,236	3,508	3,332
Intermediate court - cases outstanding at the end of the year	4,326	3,836	4,255	4,830	3,887	4,839	6,413	6,422
Industrial court - cases pending at the beginning of the year	944	661	423	532	816	835	1,149	1,155
Industrial court - cases lodged	1,173	830	1,072	1,272	1,095	1,181	1,183	1,215
Industrial court - cases disposed	1,456	1,068	963	1,119	1,078	1,002	1,177	1,280
Industrial court - cases outstanding at the end of the year	661	423	532	816	835	1,149	1,155	1,090
District court - cases pending at the beginning of the year	50,583	35,890	31,032	28,630	24,396	25,163	32,634	34,913
District court - cases lodged	123,595	107,745	111,818	113,977	110,162	123,226	128,529	114,521
District court - cases disposed	132,886	106,438	106,147	110,128	107,527	110,849	128,720	119,485
District court - cases outstanding at the end of the year	35,836	31,032	28,630	24,396	25,163	32,634	32,443	29,949
Court of Rodrigues - cases pending at the beginning of the year	563	601	2,019	1,008	321	306	572	305
Court of Rodrigues - cases lodged	1,741	3,277	3,213	2,323	2,162	5,244	3,941	4,863
Court of Rodrigues - cases disposed	1,703	1,859	4,224	3,010	2,469	4,897	4,208	4,658
Court of Rodrigues - cases outstanding at the end of the year	601	2,019	1,008	321	306	653	305	510
Total - cases pending at the beginning of the year	67,647	53,012	50,014	43,805	39,802	39,336	49,096	52,809
Total - cases lodged	137,635	122,561	127,353	130,934	126,645	142,741	147,194	133,423
Total - cases disposed	146,556	118,928	122,615	126,591	122,975	128,452	145,951	139,667
Total - cases outstanding at the end of the year	53,270	50,004	43,805	39,802	52,809	39,336	48,208	50,339

== Criticism ==
There are complaints about police brutality and condition of accused in the prison are still considered to be unsatisfactory. The buildup of delays in both civil and criminal cases are considered is placed as another common criticism of the system. Lord Mackay, appointed as Chairman as the Commission to reform the Judicial system and Legal Profession of Profession of Mauritius in 1998. In his recommendations, he made various recommendations including review of the role of Director of Public Prosecution (DPP), whose role is to handle all state prosecutions. Mackay was asked to review the recommendations in 2006. The delay in implementing the reforms is commonly seen as another pitfall of the judiciary.

== See also ==
- Supreme Court of Mauritius
