= Marie, Queen of Rodrigues =

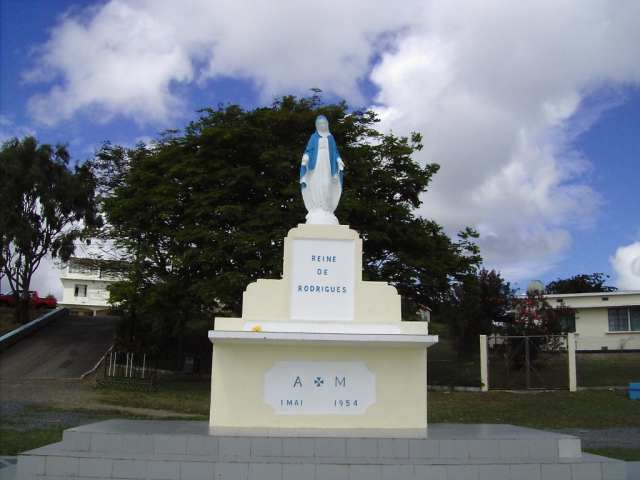
Mary, Queen of Rodrigues

Marie, Queen of Rodrigues (Marie, Reine de Rodrigues) is a six-foot tall statue of the Virgin Mary erected on the heights of Pointe Canon, Rodrigues. The statue is a noted landmark of Port Mathurin and is a gathering place for Catholics on the island as well as a tourist and historical site. The cement statue was inaugurated on May 1, 1954.

The idea for such a statue on the island was that of Father Charles Streicher, who was the priest of Rodrigues in the late 1940s. He wanted to raise in miniature a monument like that of Mary, Queen of Peace, which he had had erected in Mauritius. It was his successor, Father Gandy, who oversaw the installation of Rodrigues' statue.
