= Jacques Édouard =

Mauritian politician

MP for Rodrigues
- Incumbent
- Assumed office 29 November 2024

Personal details
- Party: Alliance Liberation

Jacques Édouard is a Mauritian politician from the Alliance Liberation. He was elected a member of the National Assembly of Mauritius in 2024. He represents Rodrigues and was elected under the Best Loser System.
