= Rehana Mungly-Gulbul =

Mauritian judge (born 1960)

Chief Justice of the Supreme Court of Mauritius
- Incumbent
- Assumed office 18 November 2021
- Preceded by: Asraf Caunhye
- Senior Puisne Judge: Nirmala Devat

Personal details
- Born: 27 April 1960 (age 66) Vacoas-Phoenix, Mauritius

Rehana Bibi Mungly-Gulbul (born 7 April 1960) is a Mauritian judge and lawyer. In 2021, she became the first woman Chief Justice of the Supreme Court of Mauritius.

== Career ==
Mungly-Gulbul was born on 27 April 1960 and grew up in Vacoas-Phoenix, Mauritius. She subsequently studied at the local Queen Elizabeth College. In 1983, she was called to the bar in the United Kingdom.

Back in Mauritius, Mungly-Gulbul practiced as a barrister and served as a Law Officer at the Crown Law Office until 1990, when she was promoted to magistrate at the Intermediate Court; she subsequently held the posts of Vice-President of the Intermediate Court and President of the Industrial Court.

She began working at the Supreme Court of Mauritius in 2002 when she was appointed Master and Registrar, eventually becoming a puisne judge in 2008 when she was appointed by President of Mauritius Anerood Jugnauth. It was in 2020 that Mungly-Gulbul became a senior puisne judge. On 16 November 2021, the State House announced that President Prithvirajsing Roopun had appointed Mungly-Gulbul as the first woman to preside over the Supreme Court after consulting with the Prime Minister, and Nirmala Devat her deputy as the Senior Puisne Judge. She took office on 18 November 2021, succeeding Asraf Caunhye, who retired. She is expected to retire as head of the judiciary on the day before her 67th birthday, on 26 April 2027, and be succeeded by Devat.
