= Nirmala Devat =

Mauritian judge and lawyer

Senior Puisne Judge of the Supreme Court of Mauritius
- Incumbent
- Assumed office November 2021
- Chief Justice: Rehana Mungly-Gulbul

Personal details
- Born: 8 September 1961 (age 64)

Nirmala Devat-Oogarah (born 8 September 1961) is a Mauritian judge and lawyer. Since 2021, she has been Senior Puisne Judge (SPJ) in the Supreme Court of Mauritius.

== Biography ==
Devat served as a magistrate then was appointed a judge in 2009.

In 2018, Devat was one of the three judges (alongside Asraf Caunhye and Gaitree Jugesser-Manna) who sat on the commission of inquiry initiated against the former President of Mauritius, Ameenah Gurib-Fakim.

In Mauritius, the Supreme Court comprises the Chief Justice, the Senior Puisne Judge, and 20 other puisne judges. Since November 2021, Devat has been Senior Puisne Judge, Deputy Chief Justice and second highest ranking member of the judiciary. She serves on the Judicial and Legal Service Commission.

Mauritanian law follows the rule of seniority in the appointment process of the judiciary. Chief Justice Rehana Mungly-Gulbul is expected to retire as head of the judiciary on the day before her 67th birthday, on 26 April 2027. Devat is due to succeed her as Chief Justice and hold the position until 7 September 2028, the day she completes her year of retirement..
