= Y. K. J. Yeung Sik Yuen =

Chief Justice of Mauritius from 2007 to 2013

Y. K. J. Yeung Sik Yuen GOSK
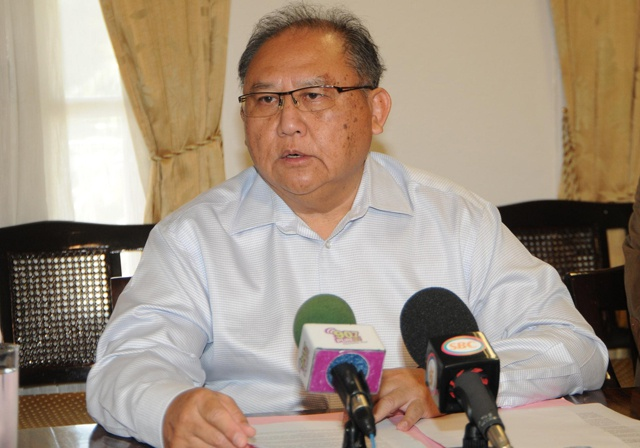
- (2015)

Chief Justice of Mauritius
- In office 13 June 2007 – 31 December 2013
- Preceded by: Ariranga Pillay
- Succeeded by: Kheshoe Parsad Matadeen

Personal details
- Born: 1 January 1947 (age 79) Curepipe, Mauritius
- Education: University of Leeds

Chinese name
- Traditional Chinese: 楊欽俊
- Simplified Chinese: 杨钦俊
Transcriptions
Standard Mandarin
- Hanyu Pinyin: Yáng Qīnjùn
- Bopomofo: ㄧㄤˊ ㄑㄧㄣ ㄐㄩㄣˋ
- Gwoyeu Romatzyh: Yang Chinjiunn
Hakka
- Pha̍k-fa-sṳ: Yòng Khîm Chun

Bernard Yeung Kam John Yeung Sik Yuen GOSK (born 1 January 1947) is a former Chief Justice of the Supreme Court of Mauritius.

== Career ==
After being called to the bar at Lincoln's Inn, London in 1970, Yeung Sik Yuen returned to his native Mauritius and took a position as State Counsel in the office of the Attorney-General of Mauritius, wherein he served until 1976. After that he moved to the bench, serving first as a magistrate and from 1984 to 1989 as Master & Registrar and Judge in Bankruptcy. He was named a judge of the Supreme Court in 1989, and elevated to Senior Puisne Judge in 1995. He was sworn in as Chief Justice on 13 June 2007, succeeding Ariranga Pillay after the latter's retirement and was replaced on 31 December 2013 by Kheshoe Parsad Matadeen. He has also served as the Mauritian independent expert on the UN Committee on the Elimination of Racial Discrimination.

== Personal life ==
Yeung Sik Yuen was born in Curepipe into a family of Hakka Sino-Mauritian businesspeople; his ancestors started out as shopkeepers and grew their company into various fields. He did his secondary education at St. Joseph's College, Curepipe and then in 1966 went to the United Kingdom to study law at the University of Leeds, completing his degree in 1969. He has been the President of the Lions Club of Port-Louis in 1988 and 2000. He is married with three children. His nephew Michael was Mauritius' Minister of Tourism and Leisure.
