= Politics of Mauritius =

Politics of Mauritius Politique à Maurice
- Coat of arms of Mauritius
- Polity type: Unitary parliamentary republic
- Constitution: Constitution of Mauritius

Legislative branch
- Name: National Assembly
- Type: Unicameral
- Meeting place: Port Louis
- Presiding officer: Shirin Aumeeruddy-Cziffra, Speaker

Executive branch
- Head of state
- Title: President
- Currently: Dharam Gokhool
- Appointer: National Assembly
- Head of government
- Title: Prime Minister
- Currently: Navin Ramgoolam
- Appointer: President
- Cabinet
- Name: Cabinet of Mauritius
- Leader: Prime Minister
- Ministries: list

Judicial branch
- Name: Judiciary of Mauritius
- Supreme Court

Politics of Mauritius (French: Politique à Maurice) takes place in a framework of a parliamentary democracy. There are three branches, the Government of Mauritius, namely the legislative, the executive and the Judiciary embedded in the Constitution of Mauritius. Being a Westminster system of government, Mauritius's unicameral house of parliament officially, the National Assembly, is supreme. It elects the President and the Prime Minister. While the President is voted by a single majority of votes in the house, the Prime Minister is the MP who supports a majority in the house (fusion of powers). The President is the Head of State while the prime minister has full executive power and is the Head of Government who is assisted by a council of Ministers. Mauritius has a multi-party system.

The Economist Intelligence Unit rated Mauritius a "full democracy" in 2022. Mauritius stands out as one of few African states to enjoy continuous spells of democracy since independence.

Historically, Mauritius's government has been led by the Labour Party or the MSM for the exception of short periods from 1982 to 1983 and 2003–2005 where the MMM was at the head of the country. L'Alliance Lepep, a coalition of several political parties including MSM, Muvman Liberater and PMSD, won the 2014 elections. Two years into the political term, the PMSD announced their resignation from the coalition government on 19 December 2016, and joined the ranks of the opposition. On 23 January 2017, the then prime minister, 86-year-old Sir Aneerood Jugnauth, a key political figure in Mauritian politics who had previously served several political terms spanning over many decades, announced that he was stepping down as prime minister. Following the Westminster tradition, the leader of the governing party (MSM party) in the coalition government, Pravind Jugnauth who is Sir Aneerood Jugnauth's son and then Minister of Finance, was sworn in as prime minister. Although Sir Aneerood Jugnauth resigned as prime minister, he ikept serving as Minister Mentor, Minister of Defence, Minister for Rodrigues. Mauritius' ruling Militant Socialist Movement (MSM) won more than half of the seats in 2019 parliamentary election, securing then incumbent prime minister Pravind Kumar Jugnauth a new five-year term. On 10 November 2024, the opposition coalition, Alliance du Changement, won 60 of the 66 seats in the Mauritian general election. Its leader, former prime minister Navin Ramgoolam, became the new prime minister.

== Legislative branch ==
The president and vice president are elected by the National Assembly for five-year terms. They form part along with the Speaker of the National Assembly, the legislative offices which under the constitution have the final decision and last word on any legislative matter including the laws of Mauritius. Most of the work is executed by the Executive Branch which consists of the Cabinet of Ministers, Leader of the Opposition and also other members of the parliament.

== Executive branch ==
Another important structure of the government of Mauritius is the executive branch. The Prime Minister is appointed by the president and is responsible to the National Assembly (fusion of powers). The Council of Ministers is appointed by the president on the recommendation of the prime minister. The Council of Ministers (cabinet), responsible for the direction and control of the government, consists of the prime minister (head of government), the leader of the majority party in the legislature, and about 24 ministers including one deputy prime minister and/or one vice prime minister.

The Executive branch being with the Cabinet have four most powerful executive offices: prime minister, deputy prime minister and two offices of vice prime minister. They have the executive power and authority over the cabinet and also help the prime minister in his tasks and responsibilities.

Main office-holders
Office	Name	Party	Since
President	Dharam Gokhool	Labour Party	6 December 2024
Prime Minister	Navin Ramgoolam	Labour Party	13 November 2024

== Power sharing ==
In Mauritius, the prime minister enjoys significant power whereas the president has a mostly ceremonial role. The president as head of state resides in a historical Chateau laid on 220 hectares of land and the prime minister resides in the much smaller Clarisse House. Nevertheless, the prime minister is the chief executive. He is responsible for any bill sent to the president from the assembly. He presides over all cabinet ministers and is the first adviser of the president. He is the head of government and it is on his advice that the president shall appoint any person in the government.

== Order of precedence ==
This is a list of ceremonial precedence for the Mauritian government:

1. The President
2. The Prime Minister
3. The Vice President
4. The Deputy Prime Minister
5. The Chief Justice
6. The Speaker of the National Assembly
7. The Former Presidents
8. The Former Prime Ministers
9. The Vice Prime Ministers
10. The Ministers
11. The Leader of the Opposition
12. The Former Vice Presidents
13. The Government Chief Whip
14. The Chief Commissioner of Rodrigues
15. The Parliamentary Private Secretaries
16. The Secretary to Cabinet and Head of the Civil Service
17. Financial Secretary/Secretary for Home Affairs/Secretary for Foreign Affairs/Chief of Staff, PMO
18. Dean of the Diplomatic Corps/Heads and Acting Heads of Diplomatic Missions/Representatives of International and Regional Organisations
19. The Senior Puisne Judge
20. The Solicitor General/Puisne Judges/Senior Chief Executives
21. The Chief of Protocol
22. The Commissioner of Police
23. The Permanent Secretaries/Ambassadors/Secretary to President
24. The Deputy Speaker/Members of the National Assembly
25. The Heads of Religious Bodies
26. Holders of GOSK and/or persons knighted
27. Lord Mayor of Port-Louis/Mayors/Chairpersons of District Councils
28. Consul General/Consuls/Honorary Consuls General/Honorary Consuls

== Judicial branch ==
Mauritian law is an amalgam of French and British legal traditions. The Supreme Court—a chief justice and five other judges—is the highest local judicial authority. There is an additional higher right of appeal to the Judicial Committee of the Privy Council. Members of the Judicial Committee of the Privy Council have been located in Mauritius since the end of 2008, as part of a plan to lower the costs of appeal.

The present Chief Justice of the Supreme Court is, Rehana Mungly-Gulbul who succeeded Ashraf Caunhye in 2021.

== Political controversies ==
=== 2024 censorship of social media platforms ===
On 31 October 2024, ahead of the general elections taking place on 10 November, the ICT Authority ordered telecommunication operators to block all social media platforms. This came in response to "concerns regarding illegal postings that may impact national security and public safety". Many Mauritians associated the "illegal postings" with the Missie Moustass audio leaks.

=== 2024 Missie Moustass audio leaks ===
In October 2024, weeks ahead of the general elections, an anonymous Facebook account by the name of Missie Moustass (Mauritian Creole for "Mr Mustache") released audio recordings allegedly made by the sitting government on political adversaries, journalists, diplomats, and lawyers. These recordings consisted of phone calls made over WhatsApp, as well as traditional mobile. Shortly after this series of leaks, the Facebook account was taken down. However, an account of the same name was then created on TikTok where the previous audio leaks were reposted, as well as new ones. Some of the people whose phone calls were recorded and subsequently released confirmed their validity, and that those conversations had indeed happened.

Eventually, the TikTok account was also blocked, after which Missie Moustass created a YouTube Account, which remained active afterwards. On 1 November 2024, Mauritius suspended access to social media platforms just 10 days before national elections, citing national security concerns amid a scandal involving leaked phone recordings of politicians. Opposition leaders condemned the move as an attack on freedom of expression and a desperate tactic by the ruling party ahead of the November 10 election.

== See also ==
- List of political parties in Mauritius
- Prime Minister of Mauritius
- Elections in Mauritius
