= Marie Christiane Agathe =

Politician from Rodrigues

Member of the Rogrigues Regional Assembly
- Incumbent
- Assumed office 27 February 2022
- Constituency: Maréchal

Commissioner for Family Protection and Children's Rights
- Incumbent
- Assumed office 27 February 2022

Personal details
- Occupation: Politician, teacher

Marie Christiane Agathe is a politician and teacher from Rodrigues. She was elected to the Rodrigues Regional Assembly on 27 February 2022, representing the Maréchal region, for the Rodrigues Alliance. She was also appointed to the executive committee of the Regional Assembly, where she is the only woman, in the role of Commissioner for Family Protection and Children's Rights.
