= Intinti Ramayanam (2023 film) =

2023 Telugu-language comedy-drama film

- Directed by: Suresh Naredla
- Written by: Suresh Naredla
- Produced by: Venkat Upputuri; Gopichand Innamuri
- Starring: Rahul Ramakrishna; Navya Swamy; Naresh
- Cinematography: P. C. Mouli
- Edited by: S. B. Uddhav
- Music by: Kalyani Malik
- Production companies: Maruthi Team; Ivy Productions
- Release date: 9 June 2023
- Running time: 132 minutes
- Country: India
- Language: Telugu

Intinti Ramayanam is a 2023 Indian Telugu-language comedy drama film written and directed by debutant Suresh Naredla and produced by Venkat Upputuri and Gopichand Innamuri, under Ivy Productions. The film features Rahul Ramakrishna, Navya Swamy, Naresh in primary roles.

== Plot ==
Intinti Ramayanam is a story of the changing dynamics of relationships that exist between members of a simple middle-class family from a small village in Telangana. The events of the story are spiraled by a theft that takes place in the house after which the family’s 50-years-old patriarch, Ramulu, is torn between pursuing the thief who stole from him and pursuing his own family members as prime suspects in the theft.

== Cast ==
- Naresh as Ramulu, Sandhya's father
- Rahul Ramakrishna as Seenu, Sandhya's boyfriend
- Navya Swamy as Sandhya, Ramulu's daughter
- Surabhi Prabhavathi as Lakshamma, Ramulu's wife and Sandhya's mother
- Gangavva
- Anji Mama
- Jeevan
- Radhika
- Steven Madhu
- Kavitha Srirangam
- Anji
- Bithiri Sathi in a special appearance

== Release ==
The film was released theatrically on 9 June 2023.

Digital streaming rights are obtained by Aha and premiered on 23 June 2023.

== Reception ==
Avad Mohammad of OTTplay gave it 2.5 out of 5 stars and wrote,"On the whole, Intinti Ramayanam is a village drama with passable comedy and neat performances. But the required drama is missing in key areas and the slow pace also plays the villain. The film has nothing great to boast and is best suited for the OTT viewing.

== See also ==
- Intinti Ramayanam (1979 film)
- Intinti Ramayanam (television series)
