= Francisco François =

Mauritian politician

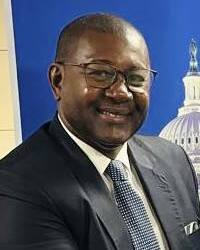
- Francisco François in 2025

MP for Rodrigues
- Incumbent
- Assumed office 2010

Personal details
- Party: Rodrigues People's Organisation

Francisco Jean François is a Mauritian politician who is the leader of the Rodrigues People's Organisation. He was elected a member of the National Assembly of Mauritius in 2024. He represents Rodrigues.
