= Nirmal (disambiguation) =

Nirmal is a city in Telangana, India.

Nirmal may also refer to the following associated with the city:

- Nirmal furniture
- Nirmal paintings
- Nirmal toys and craft
- Nirmal (Assembly constituency)

Nirmal means "pure" or "unsullied" in Sanskrit. List of people who bear the name Nirmal:

- Nirmal Baba, an Indian spiritual leader
- Nirmal Jain (born 1966/67), Indian billionaire, founder of India Infoline
- Nirmal Purja, Nepali and British mountaineer

== See also ==
- Nirmala (disambiguation)
- Nirmala (sect), a Sikh religious order
