= Port Mathurin =

Capital of the island of Rodrigues

Port Mathurin Por Matirin (Morisyen)
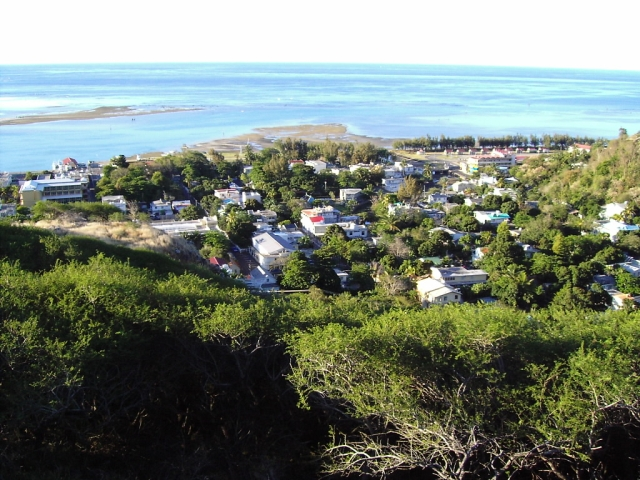
- Port Mathurin as seen from Mount Fanal

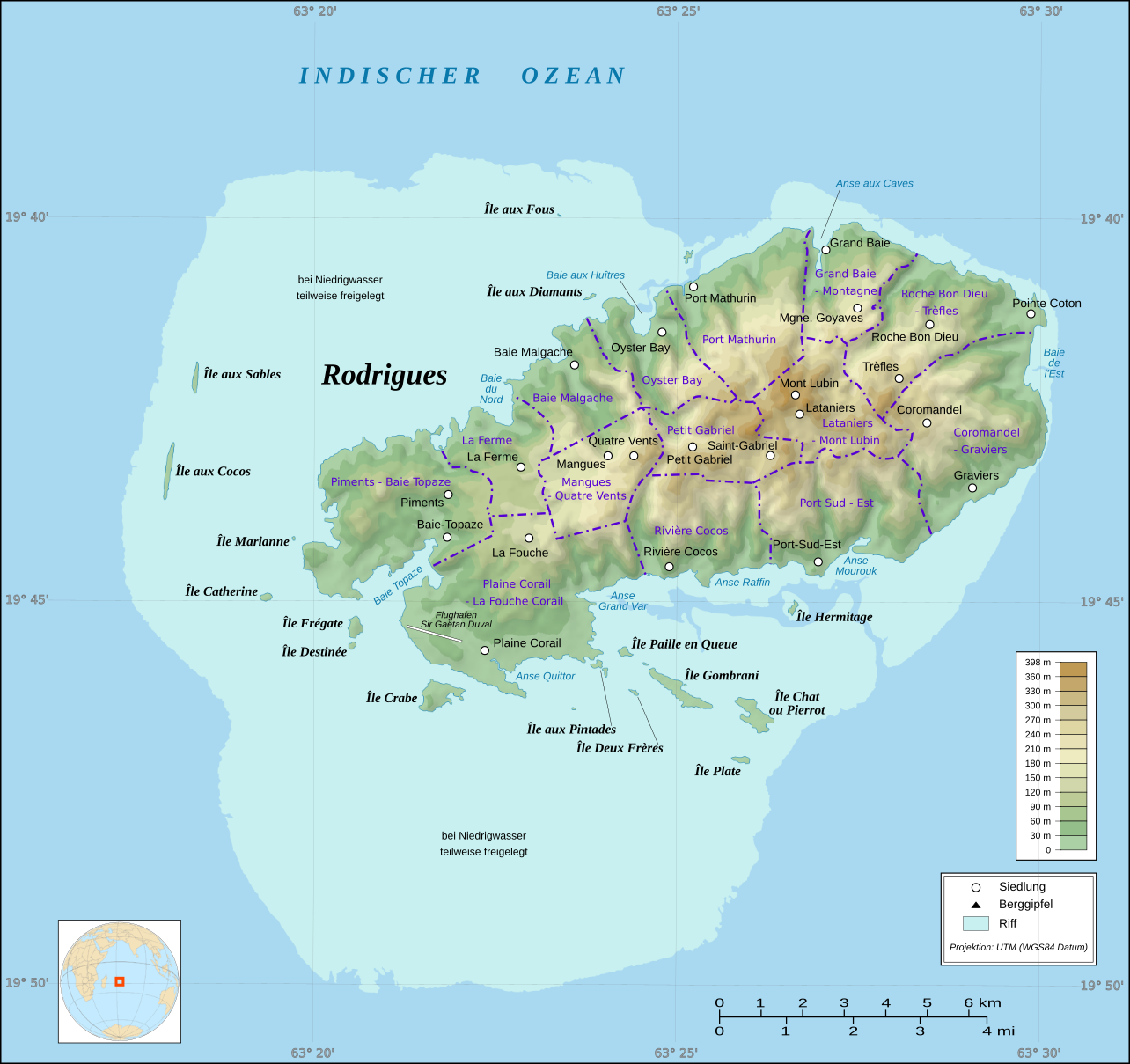
- 14 Zones of Rodrigues, with Port Mathurin due north
- Coordinates: 19°41′S 63°25′E
- Country: Mauritius
- Island: Rodrigues

Population
  - Total: 6,000
- Time zone: UTC+4 (MUT)
- Climate: Aw

The village of Port Mathurin (French pronunciation: [pɔʁ matyʁɛ̃]) serves as the capital of the island of Rodrigues, a dependency of Mauritius. Most of the population of Rodrigues is settled close to or in the city. It lies on the north coast of the Indian Ocean island and functions as the administrative, judicial and economic centre of Rodrigues. As the name suggests, it also operates the main harbour of the island.

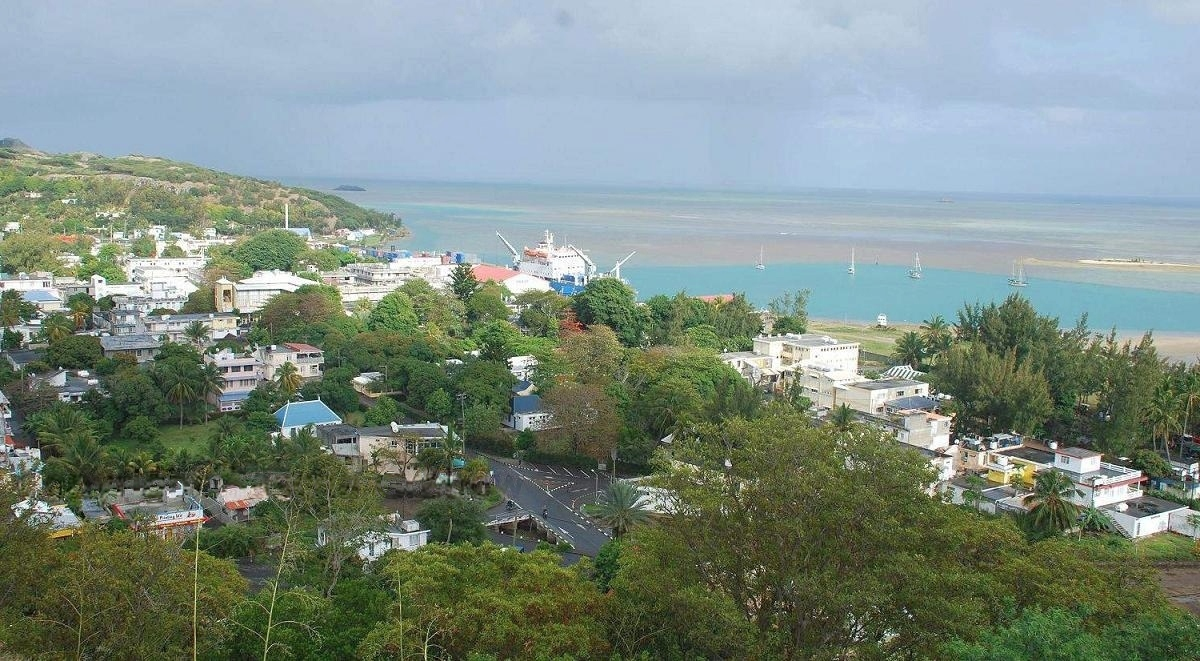
Port Mathurin

Port Mathurin has a population of around 6,000 people (2006). Sights include its market, while the town also has the island's only bus station and a viewpoint on Mount Fanal, south of the town. There is a Roman Catholic church, an Anglican church, and a small mosque. Other landmarks of Port Mathurin include Marie, Queen of Rodrigues, a statue of the Virgin Mary located in Pointe Canon. The two ships of the Mauritius Cargo Handling Corporation, namely MV Mauritius Pride and Mauritius Trochetia, anchor at Port Mathurin five times every month.

On 1 May 1691, François Leguat and the first French landed on Rodrigues at the site of the future village, which was founded by French colonists in 1735. The place takes its name from that of an early French settler, either Mathurin Bréhinier or Mathurin Morlaix.

In 1901 Port Mathurin became home to offices for the Britain-Australia undersea cable.

There are 22 localities within the zone of Port Mathurin, which is one of 14 statistical subdivisions of Rodrigues, to which the population of 6,000 relates:

1. Baie Lascars (North)
2. Camp du Roi
3. Castor
4. Caverne Provert
5. Citronelle
6. Crève Coeur
7. Désiré
8. English Bay
9. Fond La Digue
10. Jentac
11. Mont Piton
12. Mont Vénus
13. Montagne Charlot
14. Montagne Fanal
15. Pointe Canon
16. Pointe Monnier
17. Port Mathurin
18. Roseaux
19. Solitude
20. Soupir
21. Terre Rouge
22. Vangar

The village (locality) has a single secondary school: Rodrigues College. Other colleges operate in other villages around the island, namely Le Chou, Marechal, Grand Montagne, Mont Lubin and Citron Donis.

The locality of Port Mathurin proper occupies a very small area, and neighbouring settlements (localities) include Fond La Digue, Montagne Fanal, Pointe Monier, Camp du Roi and Baie Lascar.

In 1996, the Expedition yacht Admiral Nevelskoi, adrift without crew since being abandoned after losing its mast and rudder circa two years prior, was salvaged off the coast of Rodrigues Island. The sailboat, which had been property of the Admiral Nelskoi Maritime University in Vladivostok (Russia) until its abandonment, was symbolically given to Hon. Bernard Eric Typhis Degtyarenko by the Russian government in 2010, and declared as a Maritime Museum by the Admiral Nevelskoi Maritime University. The donation was symbolic as, under international maritime law, the owners of a ship relinquish ownership upon abandonment of the ship and its salvors take ownership with the salvage.

== Climate ==
Climate data for Port Mathurin (1991–2020)
Month	Jan	Feb	Mar	Apr	May	Jun	Jul	Aug	Sep	Oct	Nov	Dec	Year
Record high °C (°F)	33.0 (91.4)	34.0 (93.2)	34.1 (93.4)	32.2 (90.0)	31.2 (88.2)	29.8 (85.6)	29.4 (84.9)	28.2 (82.8)	28.5 (83.3)	29.8 (85.6)	32.1 (89.8)	32.7 (90.9)	34.1 (93.4)
Mean daily maximum °C (°F)	29.9 (85.8)	30.0 (86.0)	29.9 (85.8)	29.1 (84.4)	27.8 (82.0)	26.4 (79.5)	25.4 (77.7)	25.2 (77.4)	25.7 (78.3)	26.6 (79.9)	27.9 (82.2)	29.1 (84.4)	27.8 (82.0)
Daily mean °C (°F)	26.9 (80.4)	27.2 (81.0)	27.1 (80.8)	26.3 (79.3)	24.8 (76.6)	23.4 (74.1)	22.4 (72.3)	22.1 (71.8)	22.5 (72.5)	23.4 (74.1)	24.7 (76.5)	26.0 (78.8)	24.7 (76.5)
Mean daily minimum °C (°F)	24.2 (75.6)	24.4 (75.9)	24.2 (75.6)	23.6 (74.5)	22.1 (71.8)	20.6 (69.1)	19.7 (67.5)	19.4 (66.9)	19.7 (67.5)	20.7 (69.3)	21.9 (71.4)	23.3 (73.9)	22.0 (71.6)
Record low °C (°F)	19.3 (66.7)	19.8 (67.6)	19.0 (66.2)	19.0 (66.2)	17.5 (63.5)	15.6 (60.1)	16.3 (61.3)	15.6 (60.1)	16.0 (60.8)	16.6 (61.9)	17.2 (63.0)	19.6 (67.3)	15.6 (60.1)
Average precipitation mm (inches)	141.8 (5.58)	150.1 (5.91)	161.7 (6.37)	130.0 (5.12)	92.4 (3.64)	73.3 (2.89)	86.4 (3.40)	62.5 (2.46)	47.1 (1.85)	50.9 (2.00)	48.5 (1.91)	68.1 (2.68)	1,112.8 (43.81)
Average precipitation days (≥ 1.0 mm)	12.7	13.4	14.2	13.4	12.8	13.2	15.4	13.2	9.8	9.1	8.4	8.7	144.2
Mean monthly sunshine hours	268.3	233.7	255.0	237.4	229.4	204.8	210.7	245.4	240.0	269.8	276.2	283.3	2,954
Source: NOAA
