= Nirmala Erevelles =

Nirmala Erevelles is a Professor in the Social Foundations of Education and Instructional Department of Education Leadership, Policy, and Technology Studies at the University of Alabama. She publishes about various topics related to disability, in particular the ways social oppression is pervasive due to differences in race, socioeconomic status, and bodies.

Erevelles earned her bachelor's degree in mathematics from Stella Maris College (Chennai), India in 1985. She earned an M.S. in special education from Syracuse University in 1989, and a Ph.D. in 1998 from Syracuse University in the "Cultural Foundations of Education".

== Contributions ==
Erevelles relies on Historical Materialism which suggests that economic inequality determines other forms of inequality - an issue which is evident in her Ph.D. dissertation. In her Ph.D., which was entitled "Bodies that do not matter: Social policy, education, and the politics of difference", Erevelles suggested that children with disabilities who are institutionalized in India are actually more privileged than the workers who help them. She commented in her dissertation that "many service providers, particularly the poor, single, lower caste women, spoke of lives of destitution that often seemed to outstrip by far the destitution experienced by many of the disabled children who received services there."

In an article co-authored with Andrea Minear entitled "Unspeakable Offenses: Untangling Race and Disability in Discourses of Intersectionality," Black and Latin@ urban students were more likely to be classified with learning disabilities. This illustrates how stereotyping and racism are coupled with an additional minority identification (disability) to relegate the students further.

=== Areas of research ===
- Marxism and Disability
- Disability Studies in Education
- Post colonial & Third World Feminist Theory
- Multicultural Education
- Sociology of Education

== Significant works ==
- Disability and Difference in Global Contexts: Enabling a Transformative Body Politic (New York: Palgrave Macmillan, 2011)
- "Educating Unruly Bodies: Critical Pedagogy, Disability Studies, and the Politics of Schooling", Educational Theory, v.50, n.1, pp. 25–47 (March 2000)
- "Disability and the Dialectics of Difference", Disability & Society, v.11, n.4 (1996)
