= Nirmala Visweswara Rao =

Dr Nirmala Visweswara Rao (born 29 May 1969) is a classical dancer in kuchipudi and Bharathanatyam.

== Early life ==
She was born to the Kamana Ramchandar Rao and Seetha Maha Lakshmi. She started learning dance at the age of 10 years from his Guru Chinta Rammurthy married Kadimi visweswara Rao in April 1988. With the encouragement of his husband she completed her Degree, M.A and MPhil in Dance. She learned from Pasupathi Rama linga satry Garu and continued her career. She started an institute Nirmala Nrutya Nikethan in the year 1998.

== Career ==
Education Qualifications

She has multiple qualifications which include a B.A. from (Andhra University), Certificate Course in Dance from (Telugu University), MPA in dance from (Central University), M.Phil. from PS Telugu University, Hyderabad and a Ph.D. in fine arts (Kuchipudi & Garaga Nrutyam)from P.S. Telugu University, Hyderabad, India (2011).

Her child performances (from her 8th year of school and onwards) established the commencement of her career. These included; Pushpanjali, Manduka Shabdam and Ramapattabishekam. At the age of 13 she won a gold medal, for a performing competition and in 1994 she finally emerged as a professional.

Since then Nirmala has had the opportunity to perform at a variety of different platforms including;

- Andhra Pradesh
- Ravindra Bharati
- Tyagaraya Ganasabha
- Hari Hara Kala Bhavanam
- Lalitha Kalathoranam,
- Shilparamam
- Shilpakala Vedika, Lal Bahadur Stadium
- Sundariah Vignana Kendra
- Indira Priyadarshini Auditorium.
- City Central Library and all other prestigious platforms in Hyderabad.
- Delhi : Third World Telugu Federation (Siri Fort Auditorium)
- West Bengal: Siliguri Utsav - Siliguri

Some cities she has performed in include; Maharashtra, Tamil Nadu, Orissa (Konark Festival), Vijayawada, Guntur, Visakhapatnam, Tirupathi, Kadapa, Nellore, Bhadrachalam, Gadwal, Pune and Bhuvaneswar.

== International performances and recognition ==
Rao has performed internationally in Poland, Turkey, Bulgaria, Austria, Sri Lanka, Malaysia, Singapore, Mauritius, Qatar, Oman, the United Arab Emirates, Bahrain, and the United States.

Ballets in which she has performed include Mohini Bhasmasura as Mohini, Shakuntala Parinayam as Shakuntala, Ananda Thandavam as Parvati, Gajananeeyam as Lakshmi, Sasirekha Parinayam, Sri Rama Katha Saram, Kshamaya Dharitri, Sree Rama Dasu Charitra as Sita, Dasavataram, Nava Durga Mahotsavam as Durga, Sree Krishna Vilasam as Radha, Ruthu Shobha as Prakruthi Matha (the goddess of nature), Bharateeya Nritya Jhari, and Lakuma Swantan.

Rao's performances have included the Vaggeyakara Festival in Bhadrachalam in 2002 and 2005, the Singapore Telugu Cultural Festival in 2006, Andhra Day celebrations in Mauritius in 2007, and a cultural programme of the Andhra Association in Pune in 2008. She has also performed at the Administrative Staff College of India in Hyderabad.

=== Awards ===
Rao's awards and honors include:

- Nrutya Kaumudi, presented by Manoranjani in 2003
- Best Youth Classical Dancer Award, presented by Abhinaya Nrutya Bharathi in 2003
- Natya Siromani, presented by Aaradhana in 2004
- Natya Mayuri, presented by Kalanjali Samstha in 2008
- Natya Kala Vidwamani, presented by the All India Telugu Association in Doha, Qatar, in 2008
- Kala Natya Prabhanjani, presented by Kalajagathi in 2012
