= Nirmala (beetle) =

Scientific classification
- Domain: Eukaryota
- Kingdom: Animalia
- Phylum: Arthropoda
- Class: Insecta
- Order: Coleoptera
- Suborder: Adephaga
- Family: Carabidae
- Subfamily: Pterostichinae
- Tribe: Pterostichini
- Subtribe: Pterostichina
- Genus: Nirmala; Andrewes, 1930

Genus of beetles

Nirmala is a genus in the ground beetle family Carabidae. There are at least two described species in Nirmala.

== Species ==
These two species belong to the genus Nirmala:

- Nirmala indica (Hope, 1831) (Nepal)
- Nirmala odelli Andrewes, 1930 (Bhutan, China, India, and Myanmar)
