= Serge Clair =

Mauritian politician (born 1940)

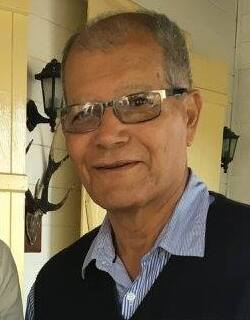
- Clair in 2016

Chief Commissioner of Rodrigues
- In office 11 February 2012 – 5 March 2022
- President: Anerood Jugnauth; Kailash Purryag; Ameenah Gurib-Fakim; Prithvirajsing Roopun
- Preceded by: Gaëtan Jabeemissar
- Succeeded by: Johnson Roussety
- In office 4 February 2003 – 4 August 2006
- President: Karl Offmann; Anerood Jugnauth
- Preceded by: Jean Daniel Spéville
- Succeeded by: Johnson Roussety

Member of Parliament; for Rodrigues
- In office 12 June 1982 – 2002
- Preceded by: None
- Succeeded by: Robert Spéville

Personal details
- Born: 1 April 1940 (age 86) British Mauritius
- Party: Rodrigues People's Organisation

Louis Serge Clair (born 1 April 1940) was the Chief Commissioner of Rodrigues from February 4, 2003, until 4 August 2006, and former minister of Rodrigues. Serge Clair, in the 1960s, abandoned priesthood to pursue a career in politics. He went to Australia to further his studies. After his studies, he returned to Rodrigues to engage actively in politics.

Serge Clair founded his party, the Rodrigues People's Organisation (or OPR) in 1976. Quickly enough, he grew in popularity, and in 1982, his party won a seat in the Legislative Assembly of Mauritius for the first time. He won the elections in 1983, 1987, 1991, 1995 and 2000 for the constituency of Rodrigues. In 2002, he resigned from the assembly to run in the Rodrigues regional election.

Rodrigues became autonomous in 2002 and established a regional assembly that participates in the general assembly of Mauritius.
