= Rodrigues College =

Coordinates: 19.682°S 63.421°E

Rodrigues College is a secondary school for both girls and boys. It is located in Port Mathurin, Rodrigues. It is the first ecumenical educational institution on the Indian Ocean.

== History ==
Rodrigues College celebrated its 30th anniversary during the year 2004. It originated from the merger of the St. Louis and St. Barnabas Colleges in 1973. Rodrigues Island has a small population and during the early seventies it was difficult to run two colleges with few students and resources.

St. Louis College was a Roman Catholic school and St. Barnabas was administered by the Anglican diocese of Mauritius. During the month of August 1973, the then managers of both institutions met and decided on a merger as a final solution to save both schools.

Since that time, Rodrigues College has grown into a popular educational institution and has educated a large portion of the Rodriguan population.

The motto of the college is ‘Sapienta Et Fortitudo,’ meaning ‘Wisdom and Strength.' Students wear a green and white uniform along with the college badge.

== Notable alumni ==
- Johnson Roussety, former chief commissioner of Rodrigues

== See also ==
- List of secondary schools in Mauritius
- Education in Mauritius
