= Alliance Liberation =

Political party in Mauritius

Alliance Liberation Alliance Libération Liberasion Lalyans
- Abbreviation: AL
- Ideology: Rodrigues interests Conservatism; Regionalism
- Political position: Centre to left-wing
- Colours: Pink
- National Assembly: 2 / 66

Election symbol

The Alliance Liberation (French: Alliance Libération; Morisyen: Liberasion Lalyans) is a Rodrigues-based political alliance in Mauritius. It is composed of the Front Patriotique Rodriguais, Mouvement Militant Rodriguais, PMSD Rodrigues and Union du Peuple de Rodrigues.

== History ==
The Rodrigues constituency-based alliance received two seats in the National Assembly of Mauritius following the 2024 Mauritian general election under the "Best Loser System". their two MPs are Dianette Henriette-Manan and Jacques Edouard.
