= Best Loser System =

Mauritian electoral system

The Best Loser System (BLS) refers to the method used in Mauritius since the 1950s to guarantee ethnic representation across the entire electorate in the National Assembly without organising the representation wholly by ethnicity.

The BLS was strongly advocated by Comité d'Action Musulman (CAM) leader Abdool Razack Mohamed after none of the 6 Muslim candidates, including himself, was elected at the 1948 general elections. Mohamed was supported by Labour Party's Seewoosagur Ramgoolam and IFB's Sookdeo Bissoondoyal during his lobby for the BLS.

Despite having been devised to ensure ethnoreligious representation in Parliament, the Best Loser System has allowed the existence of a parliamentary opposition on three occasions, namely in 1982, 1995 and 2024 when none of the elected members were from the opposition.

== Methodology ==
The island's Constitution provides for 8 additional seats (often called "Best Loser" or "Correctional" seats) to prevent under-representation of minority ethnic groups. The methodology is applied by the Office of the Electoral Commission after the proclamation of detailed results of each General Election. The Electoral Commission divides the electorate into four communities: Hindus, Muslims, Sino-Mauritians and the general population. The latter is made up of voters who do not belong to the first three, including Mauritian Creoles, Mulattos and Franco-Mauritians. The main steps are described as follows:

1. Based on the ethnic composition of the island dating back to the 1972 census the representation of 4 ethnic communities is compared to the ethnic composition of the elected members. Thus for each community the 1972 community size figure is divided by the number of seats won in the actual election by candidates of that particular community.
2. The most underrepresented ethnic community gets 1 of the first 4 additional seats. This is allocated to the best unsuccessful candidate of that community, irrespective of party affiliations.
3. The same formula is applied 3 additional times, each time the (new) level of under-representation of the ethnic communities is re-calculated. If a community runs out of candidates, the seat is not given to another community, but is kept for later allocation.
4. The Electoral Commissioner determines how many of the first 4 seats have not been given to the political party with the highest number of seats obtained in all 21 constituencies. A corresponding number of seats is then allocated to candidates of that party who belong to the most under-represented ethnic community.

== 2024 Best Losers ==
Only 4 Best Losers were nominated by the Electoral Commissioner after the November 2024 General Elections when Alliance du Changement coalition came to power:

1. Dianette Henriette-Manan (Alliance Liberation)
2. Jacques Edouard (Alliance Liberation)
3. Adrien Charles Duval (Alliance Lepep)
4. Joe Lesjongard (Alliance Lepep)

== 2019 Best Losers ==
Following the November 2019 General Elections the Electoral Commissioner (Irfan Rahman) published the list of Best Losers which consisted of the following:

1. Richard Duval (Alliance Nationale PTr-PMSD)
2. Eshan Juman (Alliance Nationale PTr-PMSD)
3. Stephan Toussaint (Alliance Morisien MSM-ML)
4. Stéphanie Anquetil (Alliance Nationale PTr-PMSD)
5. Fazila Jeewa Daureeawoo (Alliance Morisien MSM-ML)
6. Tania Diolle (Alliance Morisien MSM-ML)
7. Anwar Husnoo (Alliance Morisien MSM-ML)
8. Marie Arianne Navarre-Marie (MMM)

== 2014 Best Losers ==
7 Best Losers were nominated as a result of the December 2014 General Elections. These seats were allocated by the Electoral Commissioner (Irfan Rahman) to the following candidates who had not been elected:

1. Alain Wong (Alliance Lepep MSM-PMSD-ML)
2. Thierry Henry (Alliance Lepep MSM-PMSD-ML)
3. Raffick Sorefan (Alliance Parti Travailliste/Mouvement Militant Mauricien (Alliance PTr/MMM))
4. Franco Quirin (Alliance Parti Travailliste/Mouvement Militant Mauricien (Alliance PTr/MMM))
5. Guy Lepoigneur (Alliance Lepep MSM-PMSD-ML)
6. Salim Abbas Mamode (Alliance Lepep MSM-PMSD-ML)
7. Jean-Claude Barbier (Alliance Parti Travailliste/Mouvement Militant Mauricien (Alliance PTr/MMM))

== 2010 Best Losers ==
Following the 2010 General Elections, the Labour-MSM-PMSD coalition came to power and the Electoral Commission nominated 7 Best Losers who had not been elected:

1. Stéphanie Anquetil (PTr-MSM-PMSD)
2. Francisco François (OPR)
3. Josique Radegonde (MMM)
4. Raffick Sorefan (MMM)
5. Michael Sik Yuen (PTr-PMSD-MSM)
6. Reza Issack (PTr-PMSD-MSM)
7. Aurore Perraud (PTr-PMSD-MSM)

Soon after his 2010 nomination as a Best Loser, as well as Minister of Commerce, Cooperatives and Consumer Protection, it was revealed by the Electoral Commission that Michael Sik Yuen had identified himself as belonging to Population Générale instead of Sino-Mauricien during the nomination phase of these elections. He later justified his decision by claiming that the Best Loser System is too divisive and that it hinders the unification of the Mauritian nation. In 2014 a new party Rassemblement Citoyen pour la Patrie advertised that all its candidates would identify as to Population Générale in order to make the Best loser system less divisive. However, if adopted on a large scale, such practice would distort the allocation of seats, further undermining the representation of minorities.

== 2005 Best Losers ==
8 Best Losers were nominated to the National Assembly by the Electoral Commissioner following the 2005 General Elections as the Labour-PMSD coalition headed the new government:

1. James Burty David (PTr-PMSD)
2. Christian Léopold (MR)
3. Nicholas Von-Mally (MR)
4. Etienne Sinatambou (PTr-PMSD)
5. Cader SayedHossen (PTr-PMSD)
6. Jean-François Chaumière (PTr-PMSD)
7. Dany Perrier (MSM-MMM)
8. Showkutally Soodhun (MSM-MMM)

== 2000 Best Losers ==
8 Best Losers were nominated by the Electoral Commission after the victory of the MSM-MMM coalition. 2 of these nominees (Yerrigadoo and Ramdass) were Hindus, but from minority Telugu and Tamil communities:

1. Nicholas Von Mally (Mouvement Rodriguais)
2. James Burty David (PTrPMSD)
3. Ahmad Jeewa (MMM)
4. Christian Léopold (MR)
5. Anwar Omar (MSM-MMM)
6. Motee Ramdass (MSM-MMM)
7. Ravi Yerrigadoo (MSM-MMM)
8. Xavier-Luc Duval (PTr-PMSD)

== 1995 Best Losers ==
Only 4 Best Losers were nominated after the 1995 General Elections when the Labour-MMM coalition came to power:

1. Gaëtan Duval (Parti Gaëtan Duval)
2. Nicholas VonMally (Mouvement Rodriguais)
3. Imam Mustapha Beeharry (Mouvement Islamiste)
4. Alex Nancy (Mouvement Rodriguais)

== 1991 Best Losers ==
4 Best Losers were nominated after the 1991 General Elections as the MSM-MMM coalition came to power:

1. Razack Peeroo (PTr-PMSD)
2. Gaëtan Duval (PTr-PMSD)
3. Siddick Chady (PTr-PMSD)
4. Clarel Malherbe (PTr-PMSD)

== 1987 Best Losers ==
8 Best Losers were nominated after the 1987 General Elections:

1. Sahid Maudarbocus (MMM)
2. Swalay Kasenally (MMM)
3. Germain Comarmond (MSM-PTr)
4. Karl Offmann (MSM-PTr)
5. Showkutally Soodhun (MSM-PTr)
6. Alain Laridon (MSM-PTr)
7. Régis Finette (MSM and PMSD)
8. Zeel Peerun (MMM)

== 1983 Best Losers ==
8 Best Losers were nominated after the 1983 General Elections:

1. Paul Bérenger (MMM)
2. Joceline Minerve (MMM)
3. France Canabady (MMM)
4. Ghislaine Henry (PMSD)
5. Kamil Ramoly (PMSD)
6. Sylvio Michel (MSM-PTr)
7. Ismaël Nawoor (MSM-PTr)
8. Georgy Candahoo (MSM-PTr)

== 1982 Best Losers ==
4 Best Losers were eventually nominated to the Legislative Assembly by the Electoral Commission, although the victorious party, MMM, had seriously considered the abolition of the Best Loser system:

1. Gaëtan Duval (PMSD)
2. Nicol François (PMSD)
3. Marie-France Roussety (PTr-PMSD)
4. Michael Glover (PTr-PMSD)

== 1976 Best Losers ==
Following the 1976 General Elections, the Best Losers included the following candidates:

1. Yousuf Mohamed
2. Harold Walter (Mauritius)

== See also ==
- Member of Parliament
- National Assembly (Mauritius)
- Non-constituency Member of Parliament, a similar system in Singapore
