= Dianette Henriette-Manan =

Mauritian politician

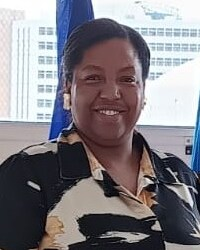
- Dianette Henriette-Manan in 2025

MP for Rodrigues
- Incumbent
- Assumed office 29 November 2024

Personal details
- Party: Alliance Liberation

Dianette Henriette-Manan is a Mauritian politician from the Alliance Liberation. She was elected a member of the National Assembly of Mauritius in 2024. She represents Rodrigues and was elected under the Best Loser System.
