= Rodrigues People's Organisation =

Political party in Mauritius

Rodrigues People's Organisation Organisation du Peuple de Rodrigues Lorganizasion Lepep Rodrig
- Abbreviation: OPR
- Leader: Francisco François
- Founder: Serge Clair
- Founded: 1976
- Ideology: Rodriguan separatism Autonomism
- Political position: Left-wing
- National Assembly: 2 / 66
- Rodrigues Regional Assembly: 8 / 17

The Rodrigues People's Organisation (French: Organisation du Peuple Rodriguais; Morisyen: Lorganizasion Lepep Rodrig, OPR) is a political party based on the island of Rodrigues, Mauritius. At the legislative elections of 11 September 2000, the party won two out of 70 seats (both the seats allocated to Rodrigues Island).

In the 2005 elections, 3 July 2005, the party won two out of 70 seats.

In the 2006 regional election, OPR won eight of 18 seats and subsequently lost government to Rodrigues Movement (MR).

In the 2012 Rodrigues election, OPR won 11 of 21 seats in the Assembly and took control of the island government from MR.

In the 2017 Rodrigues election, OPR won 10 of 17 seats.

In the 2022 Rodrigues election OPR won eight of 17 seats.

In the 2024 Mauritian general election, OPR secured two seats, winning the Rodrigues constituency.

== Election results ==
=== Legislative elections ===
Election	Leader	Votes	%	Seats	+/–	Position	Status
1976	Serge Clair	6,376	0.53	0 / 70	New	▲7th	No seats
1982	Serge Clair	16,129	1.12	2 / 66	▲2	▲5th	Coalition
1983	Serge Clair	15,981	1.16	2 / 70	Steady	▲4th	Coalition
1987	Serge Clair	17,044	1.02	2 / 70	Steady	4th	Coalition
1991	Serge Clair	16,080	0.95	2 / 66	Steady	4th	Coalition
1995	Serge Clair	16,631	1.00	2 / 66	Steady	▼6th	Coalition
2000	Serge Clair	17,317	0.93	2 / 70	Steady	▲5th	Coalition
2005	Serge Clair	20,293	1.03	2 / 70	Steady	▲4th	Coalition
2010	Serge Clair	18,815	0.93	1 / 69	▼1	▼5th	Opposition
2014	Serge Clair	21,874	1.07	2 / 69	▲1	5th	Coalition
2019	Serge Clair	20,777	0.97	2 / 70	Steady	5th	Coalition
2024	Francisco François	22,416	0.96	2 / 66	Steady	5th	Coalition

=== Regional Assembly elections ===
Election	Constituency			Party list			Total seats	+/–	Position	Status
Election	Votes	%	Seats	Votes	%	Seats	Total seats	+/–	Position	Status
2002	21,969	55.52	8 / 12	10,874	54.97	2 / 6	10 / 18	New	▲1st	Majority (2002–2006)
2002	21,969	55.52	8 / 12	10,874	54.97	2 / 6	10 / 18	New	▲1st	Opposition (2006)
2006	19,062	45.79	6 / 12	9,484	45.56	2 / 6	8 / 18	▼2	▼2nd	Opposition
2012	21,276	48.65	8 / 12	10,230	46.78	3 / 9	11 / 21	▲3	▲1st	Majority
2017	25,247	57.14	10 / 12	12,386	56.07	0 / 5	10 / 17	▼1	1st	Majority
2022	21,896	46.95	6 / 12	10,777	46.22	2 / 5	8 / 17	▼2	1st	Opposition
