= Supreme Court of Mauritius =

- Coat of arms of Mauritius
- Interactive map of Supreme Court of Mauritius
- Jurisdiction: Mauritius
- Location: Port Louis
- Composition method: By the President, after consultation with the Prime Minister
- Authorised by: Constitution of Mauritius
- Appeals to: Judicial Committee of the Privy Council
- Judge term length: 67 years of age
- Website: supremecourt.govmu.org

Chief Justice
- Currently: Rehana Mungly-Gulbul
- Since: 18 November 2021

The Supreme Court of Mauritius is the highest court of Mauritius. It was established in its current form in 1850, replacing the Cour d'Appel established in 1808 during the French administration and has a permanent seat in Port Louis. There is a right of appeal from the Supreme Court of Mauritius directly to the Judicial Committee of the Privy Council in London, which is the court of final appeal for Mauritius.

On 30 July 2020, a new building housing the Supreme Court was inaugurated jointly by Mauritian Prime Minister Pravind Jugnauth and India's premier Narendra Modi.

The chief justice is the head of the court and has precedence over any other judges in the republic. The chief justice is second in line (after the vice-president) to succeed the president in case of removal, death or resignation until a new president is elected. The chief justice is also fifth in the line of precedence following the president, prime minister, vice president and deputy prime minister. As from 2021, the current chief justice is Rehana Mungly-Gulbul, the first woman ever to occupy this position, having been appointed 18 November 2021, succeeding Ashraf Caunhye. The major divisions of the Supreme Court are the Family Division, Commercial Division, Master's Court, Mediation Division, Criminal Division, Financial Crimes Division, Land Division, Court of Civil Appeal and Court of Criminal Appeal. The Judicial Committee of the Privy Council is the final Court of appeal in Mauritius.

== History ==
The modern system of law in Mauritius is an amalgamation of French civil law and common law, while civil and criminal procedure are modelled based on British practice. The official language used in the Supreme Court is English.

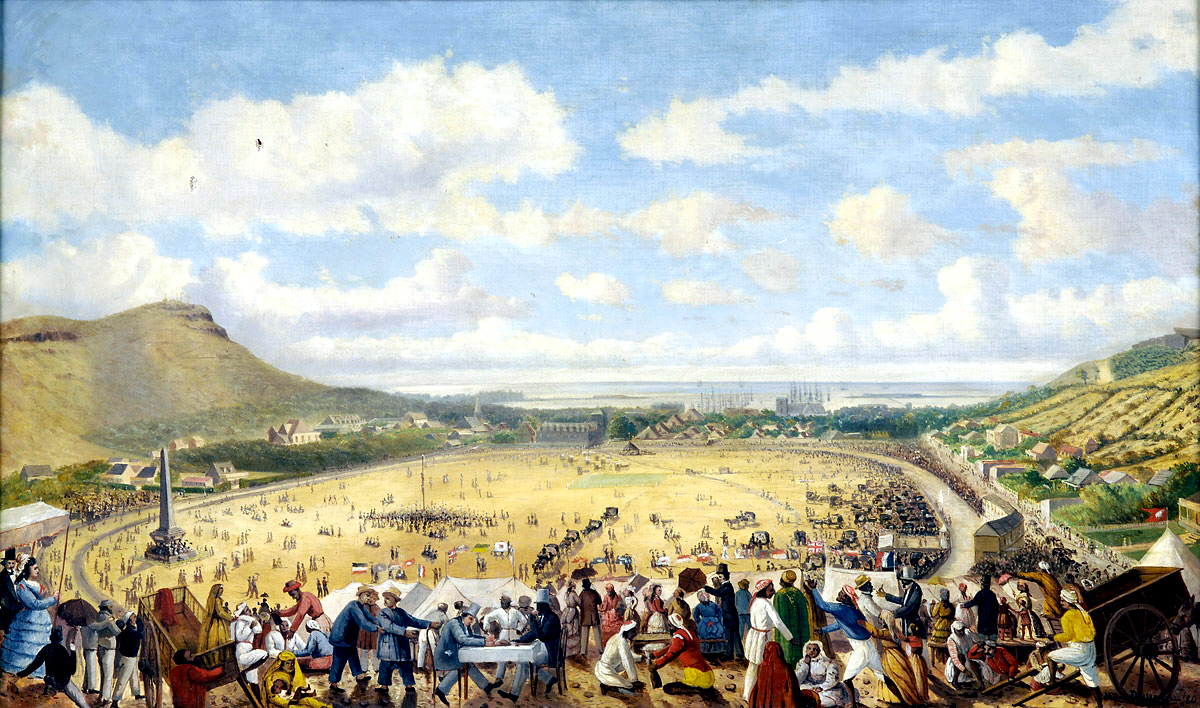
Champ de Mars, Port Louis, 1880

In 1507 Portuguese sailors came to the uninhabited island and established a visiting base. Diogo Fernandes Pereira, a Portuguese navigator, was the first European known to land in Mauritius. He named the island "Ilha do Cirne". The Portuguese did not stay long as they were not interested in these islands. In 1598 a Dutch squadron under Admiral Wybrand Van Warwyck landed at Grand Port and named the island "Mauritius" after Prince Maurice van Nassau of the Dutch Republic, the ruler of his country. France, which already controlled neighbouring Île Bourbon (now Réunion), took control of Mauritius in 1715 and renamed it Isle de France. From 1767 to 1810, except for a brief period during the French Revolution when the inhabitants set up a government virtually independent of France, the island was controlled by officials appointed by the French Government. A Penal Code was published in 1791 and adopted by the Colonial Assembly in 1793, while a separate civil code was promulgated on 3 September 1807. The Supreme Court was established as a supreme body composed of the Prime minister, President, three judges, four clerks and a government commissioner where appeal from neighbouring Seychelles was also allowed.

Despite winning the Battle of Grand Port, the only French naval victory over the British during these wars, the French could not prevent the British from landing at Cap Malheureux during 1810. They formally surrendered the island on the fifth day of the invasion, 3 December 1810, on terms allowing settlers to keep their land and property and to use the French language and law of France in criminal and civil matters. Under British rule, the island's name reverted to Mauritius. The British rule established a two tier system where the justice can have a higher appeal in Majesty's council. By 1851, after many changes in the judicial administration laws, Supreme Court was established as the body of appeal, making it again a single tiered jurisdiction. A bail court was later established with a judge of the Supreme court with a right to appeal, making it a two-tiered system.

== Composition ==
The Supreme Court has the Chief Justice, a Senior Puisne Judge and a number of Puisne Judges as prescribed by the Parliament of Mauritius. As of 2014, there were 17 Puisne judges. The Chief Justice is appointed by the President in consultation with the Prime Minister, the Senior Puisne Judge acting in accordance with the advice of Chief Justice and the Puisne Judges acting in accordance with the advice of the Judicial and Legal service Commission as listed in Section 77 of the Constitution. To qualify as a Chief Justice of the Supreme Court of Mauritius, a person has to be a practicing barrister for at least five years, a barrister entitled to practise before the Supreme Court as listed in Section 77(4) of the Constitution. A judge of the Supreme Court holds office until the retirement age of 62. A judge may be impeached for inability to perform the functions of his office or for misbehaviour. He shall be removed from office by the President under the advice of removal referred by the Judicial Committee deputed.

== Jurisdiction ==
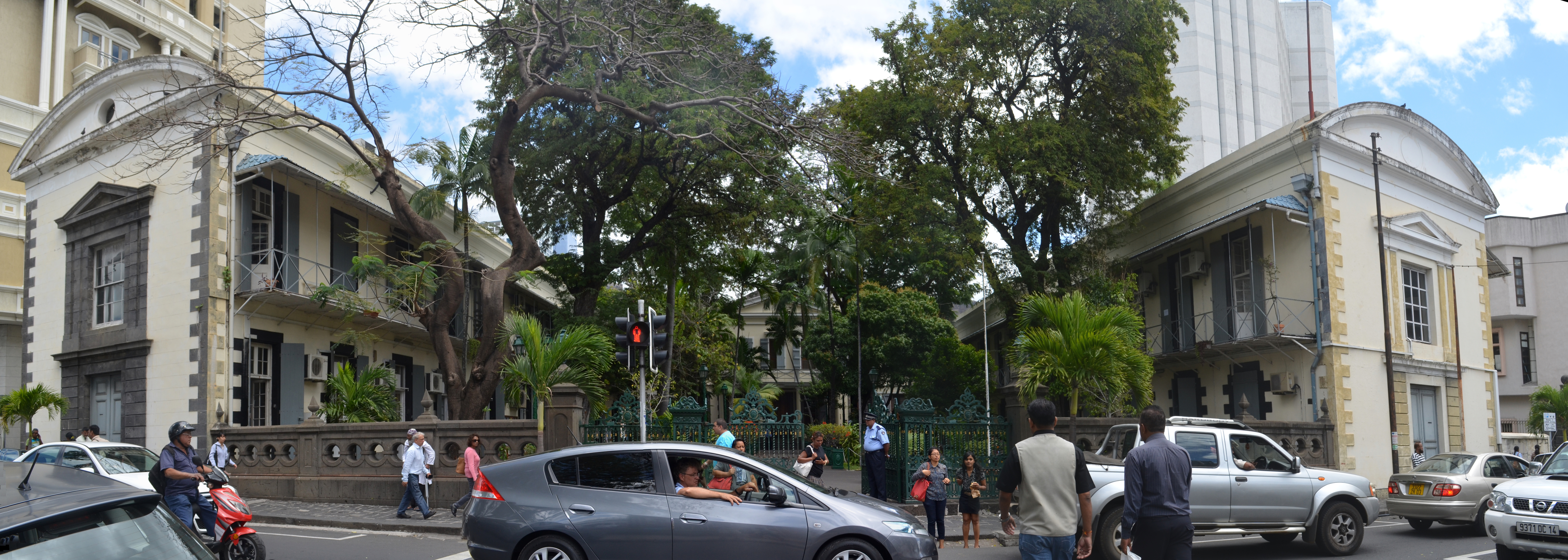
Supreme Court building in Port Louis

The Supreme Court has unlimited jurisdiction to hear and determine any civil or criminal proceedings under any law other than a disciplinary law and such jurisdiction and powers as may be conferred upon it by the Constitution or any other law. It is a superior court of record and the principal court of original civil and criminal jurisdictions. It exercises general powers of supervision over all District, Intermediate and Industrial Courts and other special courts.

The Supreme Court is also a Court of Equity vested with powers, authority, and jurisdiction to administer justice and to do all acts for the due execution of such equitable jurisdiction, in all cases where no legal remedy is provided by any enactment. Section 83 of the Constitution provides that the Supreme Court has original jurisdiction in the interpretation of the Constitution. It has the power and jurisdiction to hear and determine any complaint of a disciplinary nature in respect of the professional conduct of a law practitioner or a ministerial officer including a land surveyor. Moreover, the Supreme Court has exclusive jurisdiction in matters pertaining to judicial review and has the same powers as the High Court in England.

The Supreme Court has full power and jurisdiction to hear and determine all appeals, whether civil or criminal, made to the Court from: a judge in the exercise of his original jurisdiction, the Bankruptcy Division, the Master and Registrar, the Intermediate Court, the Industrial Court, a Magistrate, any other court or body established under any other enactment Appeals are heard before at least two judges.

== Divisions of the Supreme Court ==
The Family Division of the Supreme Court was established in January 2008 and it administers all family related cases like divorce, judicial separation, alimony and maintenance or custody or guardianship of minors. The Commercial Division of the Supreme Court established in 2009 administers all cases related to companies, disputes, trademarks, exchange, offshore business and patents. The Master's Court administers legal heir provisions of Mauritian laws. The Mediation Division disposes all civil suit, action or cause of common agreement. The Court of Civil Appeal is a division of the Supreme Court and is composed of the Judges of the Supreme Court presided by the Chief Justice or the Senior Puisne Judge. The Court of Criminal Appeal is a division of the Supreme Court and is duly constituted by three judges presided over by the Chief Justice or the Senior Puisne Judge. A person convicted before the Supreme Court may appeal under the Criminal Appeal Act against his conviction or sentence. The Supreme Court also administers all the Intermediate Courts, Industrial Court and District Courts.

The Master and Registrar is an officer of the Supreme Court and shall be a barrister of at least 5 years standing. His duties consist in the taxing of costs, to conduct and manage judicial sales, probate of wills and the matters connected therewith, interdictions and local examinations and to deal with matters of audit, inquiry, and accounts and generally, all such matters as may be referred to him by the Chief Justice or the Judges. The Master is assisted by a Deputy Master. The Secretary to the Chief Justice has a set of administrative and technical officers. The Chief Registrar has a set of Chief court officer and manager for each of the divisions and sections of the Supreme Court.

== Statistics ==
As of 2014, a total of 8,594 cases were pending before the Supreme Court of Mauritius. The number of cases before the case decreased by 1 per cent in 2014 compared to 2013, while the number of cases disposed increased by 32 per cent. The number of criminal offences convicted before the Criminal Division of the Supreme Court increased by 8 per cent in 2014. There were three sodomy and twelve convictions in drug related cases in 2014.

Number of cases before Supreme Court of Mauritius
Type	2007	2008	2009	2010	2011	2012	2013	2014
Civil cases pending at the beginning of the year	10,629	11,511	12,288	8,906	8,973	8,710	8,313	9,704
Civil cases lodged	7,368	6,995	7,366	9,020	8,944	9,033	9,427	9,295
Civil cases disposed	6,486	5,752	7,893	8,559	8,253	8,244	8,036	10,646
Civil cases outstanding at the end of the year	11,511	12,278	8,407	8,973	8,710	8,502	9,704	8,353
Criminal cases pending at the beginning of the year	229	335	416	474	466	435	431	319
Criminal cases lodged	221	249	246	214	231	198	189	184
Criminal cases disposed	115	168	169	222	206	224	302	266
Criminal cases outstanding at the end of the year	335	416	474	466	423	431	319	241
Total pending at the beginning of the year	10,858	11,846	12,704	9,380	9,439	9,145	8,744	10,023
Total cases lodged	7,589	7,244	7,612	9,234	9,175	9,231	9,616	9,479
Total cases disposed	6,601	5,920	8,062	8,781	8,459	8,468	8,338	10,912
Total cases outstanding at the end of the year	11,846	12,694	8,881	9,439	9,133	8,933	10,023	8,594

== Chief Justices of Mauritius ==
Incumbent	Tenure
British Mauritius
George Smith	30 October 1814–
Edward Berens Blackburn	10 January 1824 – 1835
James Wilson	1 October 1835–
Sir Stevenson Villiers Surtees	1857 (acting)
Sir J Edward Romono	1858 (acting)
Sir Charles Farquhar Shand	30 May 1860
Sir Nicholas Gustave Bestel	1878 (acting)
Sir Adam Gib Ellis	1 September 1879–
Sir Eugène P. J. Leclézio	22 November 1883–
Francis Taylor Piggott	7 April 1895 (acting)
Sir Eugène P. J. Leclézio	25 May 1895 – 1897
(Sir) Louis Victor Delafaye	30 April 1898–
F. C. Moncrieff	16 Feb 1900 (acting)
Ernest Didier St Amand	24 Apr 1900 (acting)
Richard Myles Brown	31 Aug 1906 (acting)
Louis Arthur Thibaud	5 Oct 1908 (acting)
Richard Myles Brown	23 Oct 1908 (acting)
Furcy Alfred Herchenroder	2 Sep 1912 (acting)
Sir Louis Victor Delafaye	12 Nov 1912 – 31 Dec 1912
Furcy Alfred Herchenroder	1 Jan 1913–1916
Thomas Ernest Roseby	1917–1929
Sir Philip Bertie Petrides	1930–1935
Sir Justin Louis Devaux	1940–1943
Sir Charlton Lane	– c. 1945
Sir Rampersad Neerunjun	c. 1960–
Michel Rivalland	1967–1970
Mauritius
Michel Rivalland	1967–1970
Sir Jean François Maurice Latour-Adrien	1970–1977
Sir William Henry Garrioch	1977–1978
Sir Maurice Rault	1978–1982
Sir Cassam Moollan	1982–1988
Sir Victor Joseph Patrick Glover	1988–1994
Rajsoomer Lallah	1995–1995
Jocelyn Serge Forget de Villerfaux	5 August 1995
Ariranga Pillay	1996–2007
Y. K. J. Yeung Sik Yuen	2007–2013
Kheshoe Parsad Matadeen	2013–2019
Marc France Eddy Balancy	26 March 2019 – 5 May 2020
Ashraf Caunhye	6 May 2020 – 17 November 2021
Rehana Mungly-Gulbul	18 November 2021 - present

== See also ==
- Judicial Committee of the Privy Council
- Politics of Mauritius
- Constitution of Mauritius
