= Ranganath =

Ranganath is one of the Indian names, based on the faith on Hindu deity Lord Ranganatha, and may refer to:

- Ranganath, Telugu film actor
- Ranganath Misra, Chief Justice, Supreme Court of India (1990–1991)
- Ranganath Vinay Kumar, Indian cricket player
- Suman Ranganath, Telugu film actress
- Ranga Nath Poudyal, Mukhtiyar of Nepal
