= Gaëtan Jabeemissar =

Mauritian politician

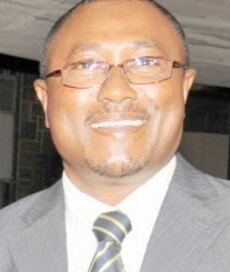
Gaëtan Jabeemissar

Gaetan Jabeemisar is a Mauritian politician who served as the Chief Commissioner of Rodrigues from 12 January 2011 to 11 February 2012. He assumed the position following the resignation of the former Chief Commissioner, Johnson Roussety, who was under a motion of no confidence.

Hailing from the village of Corail-Petite-Butte on Rodrigues island, Jabeemissar completed his secondary studies before working in education for 27 years. He left this job to enter politics as a member of the Rodrigues Movement party, and was elected to the Rodrigues Regional Assembly during its first elections in 2002. He was re-elected in 2006 and rose to the position of Deputy Chief Commissioner. After the forced resignation of Chief Commissioner Johnson Roussety, Jabeemissar was sworn in to the same position by President Anerood Jugnauth on 12 January 2011. In 2012, after 13 months at the helm, he was re-elected to the Rodrigues Regional Assembly. He was Minority Leader of the legislature, but was not re-elected in the 2017 elections.
