= Johnson Roussety =

Mauritian politician

Johnson Roussety is the current Chief Commissioner of Rodrigues in Mauritius. He held the same position from 4 August 2006 to 7 January 2011.

== Early life and education ==
Roussety was born on 27 August 1975. He attended Oysterbay Government School in Rodrigues as well as Grand Bay and NicolayGovt Schools in Mauritius. He studied up to the HSC at the Rodrigues College in Port Mathurin from 1987 to 1993. He ranked first in his HSC cohort in Rodrigues and was a laureate winning a four-year government university scholarship.

He attended the University of Reunion, where he completed a DEUG in science economics from 1994 to 1996. In 1997, he was awarded a degree in econometrics from the University of the Mediterranean - Aix - Marseille 2. In 1998 he was awarded a master's degree in economics from the University of Paris 1 - Pantheon Sorbonne with specialisation in economic analysis and policy.

He also holds a PGCE from the Mauritius Institute of Education.

== See also ==
- Politics of Mauritius
