= Rodrigues Movement =

Political party in Mauritius

Rodrigues Movement Mouvement rodriguais
- Abbreviation: MR
- Founded: September 14, 1992
- Ideology: Democratic socialism Social democracy Regionalism
- Political position: Centre-left
- Regional affiliation: Rodrigues Regional Assembly
- Colours: Green
- Seats in the Rodrigues Regional Assembly: 0 / 17

The Rodrigues Movement (French: Mouvement rodriguais) is a regional political party in Rodrigues island, Mauritius. At the legislative elections of 11 September 2000, the party won 2 out of 70 seats (both out of the 'best losers' quota).

In the 2002 Rodrigues Regional Assembly election, MR won 8 out of 18 seats.

Following Rodrigues' 2006 regional election, MR won 10 out of 18 seats, and subsequently formed government. In 2010, following the legislative election MR won two out of 70 seats at the national assembly. Both candidates were elected. In 2012, in the Rodrigues Regional Assembly election MR won 8 out of 21 seats.

In 2022 the party was reduced to 0 seat
