= Raveendra =

Raveendra may refer to

- Raveendra Geethangal, music album
- Stephen Raveendra, Indian police officer
- Raveendra Wimalasiri, Sri Lankan cricketer

== See also ==
- Raveendran (disambiguation)
- Ravinder, alternative form of the Indian male given name
- Ravindranath, a related name
