= Ghurburrun =

Ghurburrun is a surname. Notable people with the surname include:

- Rabindrah Ghurburrun, First Vice President of Mauritius
- Beergoonath Ghurburrun
