= Ravinder =

Ravinder or Ravindra is an Indian given name. A short form of the name is Ravi. Notable people with this name include:

- Rachin Ravindra, New Zealand cricketer
- Ravinder Baliala, member of the Haryana Legislative Assembly
- Ravinder Bhalla, American civil rights lawyer, and mayor of Hoboken, New Jersey
- Ravinder Bhogal, restaurateur, food writer, and chef
- Ravinder Bopara, cricketer
- Ravinder Chadha, cricketer
- Ravinder Dhallan, chairman and chief executive officer of Ravgen
- Ravinder Goswami, professor at the department of endocrinology and metabolism at the All India Institute of Medical Sciences, Delhi
- Ravinder Grewal, singer and actor
- Ravinder K. Jain, physicist, and academic from the University of New Mexico
- Ravinder Kapoor, film actor popularly known as Goga Kapoor
- Ravinder Khatri, Greco-Roman wrestler
- Ravinder Kumar, historian
- Ravinder Kumar, Member of the Legislative Assembly of India
- Ravinder Kumar, serial killer
- Ravinder Kumar Dhir, Air Marshal
- Ravinder Kumar Molhu, member of the 15th and the 16th Legislative assemblies of Uttar Pradesh
- Ravinder N. Maini, Indian-born British rheumatologist and professor at Imperial College London
- Ravindra Mhatre (c. 1936–1984), Indian diplomat and murder victim
- Ravinder Pal Singh, field hockey player
- Ravinder Raina, member of Jammu and Kashmir legislative assembly
- Ravinder Randhawa, British Asian novelist and short story writer
- Ravinder Ravi, contestant on the first season of Indian Idol
- Ravinder Senghera, Indian-born former English first-class cricketer
- Ravinder Singh, novelist
- Ravinder Singh, footballer
- Ravinder Singh, general
- Ravinder Singh, Greco-Roman wrestler
- Ravinder Singh Brahmpura
- Ravinder Singh Dhull, State Media Penalist, Bhartiya Janta Party
- Ravinder Singh Khaira, javelin thrower
- Ravinder Singh Ravi, former member of the Himachal Pradesh Legislative Assembly
- Ravinder Singh Tut, wrestler who competed in the men's freestyle 62 kg at the 1988 Summer Olympics
- Ravinderpal Singh, Canadian cricketer
- Ravindra Kaushik, alleged Indian Research and Analysis Wing (RAW) agent
- Ravindra Kumar Sinha, biologist
- Ravindra Kumar Sinha, physicist
- Ravindra Jain (1944–2015), an Indian music composer and lyricist
- Ravindra Mahajani (1949 - 2023), an Indian film actor
- Ravindra Pushpakumara (b. 1975), a Sri Lankan cricketer
- Ravindra Randeniya, a Sri Lankan actor and politician
- Ravindra Khattree (b. 1959), an Indian born statistician and professor of statistics at Oakland University
- Ravindra Kelekar (1925–2010), a noted Indian writer
- Ravindra Jadeja
- Paritala Ravindra (1958–2005), a political leader in the Rayalaseema region of Andhra Pradesh, India
- Ravindra Mankani (b. 1956), a veteran actor who is noted for his work in many a daily soaps, plays and films
- Ravindra Patil (b. 1955), a politician from Jalgaon
- Ravindra Prabhat (b. 1969), an Indian poet, writer & journalist
- Ravindra Samaraweera, a Sri Lankan politician and a member of the Parliament of Sri Lanka
- Ravindra Mhatre, an Indian diplomat in UK who was kidnapped and later murdered in Birmingham in 1984
- Ravindra Svarupa Dasa (William H. Deadwyler, III), a religious leader of the International Society for Krishna Consciousness
- Ravindra Varma (d. 2006), Minister for Labour and Parliamentary Affairs in the Morarji Desai Ministry in India
- Ravindra Kumar (b. 1959), a political scientist, peace-worker, educationalist and the former Vice-Chancellor of Meerut University
- Ravindra Pinge (1926–2008), a Marathi writer
- Ravindra Wijegunaratne (born 1962), Commander of Sri Lanka Navy 2015-2017
- Gujjula Ravindra Reddy, member of the state parliament of Brandenburg
- Ravindra K. Ahuja, a researcher and academic
- Rabindranath Tagore

== See also ==
- Rabindra Bharati University
- Ravindra Bharathi, an auditorium located in Hyderabad, India
- Ravindra Kalakshetra
- Ravindranath (disambiguation)
- Ravi (disambiguation)
- rivravinder
