= Kaviraj Sukon =

Mauritian politician

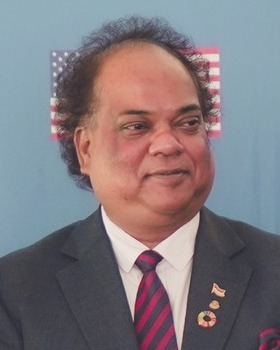
- Kaviraj Sukon in September 2025

Minister of Tertiary Education, Science and Research
- Incumbent
- Assumed office 22 November 2024

Personal details
- Party: Labour Party

Kaviraj Sharma Sukon is a Mauritian politician from the Labour Party (PTr). He has served as Minister of Tertiary Education, Science and Research in the fourth Navin Ramgoolam cabinet since 2024. He represents the constituency of Piton and Rivière du Rempart in the National Assembly and is a member of the Alliance du Changement coalition.

== Early life and education ==
Kaviraj Sukon was born to Beerbadre Sukon in Ravived community of Mauritius. Since 21 February 2021, he is serving as the President of Mauritius Arya Ravived Pracharini Sabha (MARVPS). He completed a Ph.D. in Computational Mathematics through a joint programme between the University of Mauritius and Loughborough University, UK. He also earned an MBA with distinction (ranked first) from the University of Surrey, UK.

== Academic career ==
Sukon has held several prominent academic and administrative roles in higher education in Mauritius. He began his career as a lecturer in mathematics and statistics at the University of Mauritius. Later, he worked with the Mauritius Examinations Syndicate and the Human Resource Development Council (HRDC), where he led research and consultancy initiatives and contributed to the development of the first National Human Resource Development Plan.

In July 2012, he founded the Open University of Mauritius (OU) and served as its Director-General until October 2024, transforming it into a leading higher-education institution with significant enrolment growth and full financial independence.

Sukon has also held leadership positions with the Mauritius College of the Air, the Mauritius Museums Council, and the Mauritius Research and Innovation Council. Internationally, he has been involved with the African Council of Distance Education and holds an honorary senior lectureship at Imperial College London.

== Political career ==
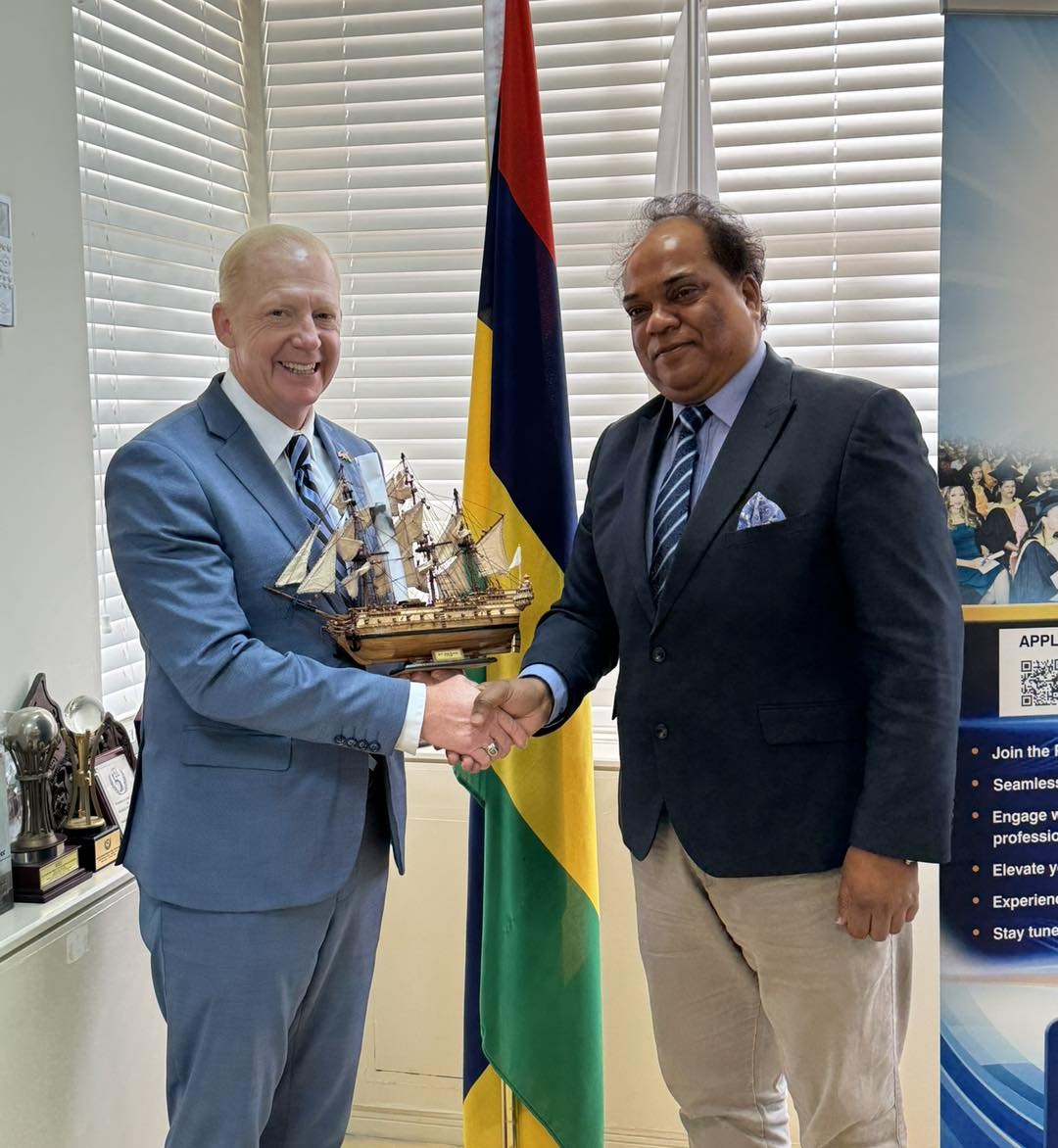
Kaviraj Sukon with Henry V. Jardine

In the 2024 general election, Sukon was elected as the third member for the Piton and Rivière du Rempart constituency. Following his election, he was appointed Minister of Tertiary Education, Science and Research on 22 November 2024. In this role, he has overseen initiatives to modernise Mauritius’s higher-education system, promote research and innovation, strengthen quality assurance frameworks, and encourage the use of open educational resources and technology-enhanced learning.

As minister, Sukon has also emphasised collaboration between academia and policy makers and has participated in national events such as the National Research Week and partnerships aimed at enhancing tertiary education’s international standing.

== Honours and other work ==
Sukon has received recognition for his contributions to education. At the 11th Pan-Commonwealth Forum on Open Learning, he was awarded an honorary fellowship of the Commonwealth of Learning for his leadership in education.

== Selected publications and contributions ==
Sukon has published research in mathematics and educational methods. He developed a new mathematical model known as the Two-Parameter Alternative Group Explicit Method and introduced the concept of “blearning” to describe blended learning approaches.

== See also ==
- Ravived
- Ravidassia
- Guru Ravidas
- Chamar
- Arya Ravived Pracharini Sabha
- Girmitiyas
