= Ravived =

Dalit caste of Mauritius

Ravived is a caste that is mainly found among Hindus in Mauritius. The origin of this caste lay in an Indian Dalit caste named Chamar. This same caste is referred to as Ravidassia outside Mauritius, and this terminology is very seldom used in Mauritius.

During the 19th century (1834 onward), many Dalits, including Chamars (leather-working caste), migrated to Mauritius as indentured laborers under British rule. Those who were followers of Guru Ravidas began identifying collectively as Ravived to affirm a dignified identity. With time the term 'Ravived' became the preferred name in Mauritius to distance from the derogatory label of 'Chamar.'

In the ship records on which Indian laborers migrated to Mauritius, around ten percent of the boarded people mentioned their caste as Chamar. After the establishment of caste hierarchies in Mauritius, the Chamar community families turned to the religious songs of Kabir and Ravidass for their own religious outlet. Slowly, they started adopting religious-sounding names from these devotional songs.

== Arya Ravived Pracharni Sabha ==
During the initial stage of migration in Mauritius, significant numbers of Chamar people joined the Arya Samaj in the hope that it would help them to be free from the curse of casteism, as it was claimed by the leaders of the Arya Samaj. But later, Upper Caste Arya Samajis started building separate halls for themselves and chamars for prayer within the same shrine to avoid Arya Samaj being labelled as a Chamar religion, which led to the establishment of Arya Ravived Pracharini Sabha in 1935. The origin of 'Arya Ravived Pracharini Sabha' lies in three different words. Arya comes from the reformist ideas of the Arya Samaj, which emphasized Vedic teachings and social upliftment, and Ravived comes from Guru Ravidas (Bhakti Saint from Chamar caste), and Pracharini Sabha means 'organisation for spreading awareness.'

== Political significance ==
In Mauritius, the Raviveds (local term for Ravidassias) historically faced caste discrimination, which led them to organize under the Arya Ravived Pracharini Sabha. Through the Sabha, they mobilized socially and religiously, which later translated into political leverage. Ravived leaders used their Sabha network to mobilize voters, making the community a key vote bank, especially in constituencies where lower-caste Hindus were numerous. After independence in 1968, Ravived leaders gained space in the mainstream political scene, especially through alliances with the Labour Party and later also with the Mauritian Militant Movement (MMM) and other parties.

Several Ravived politicians rose to prominence as Members of Parliament, ministers, and socio-cultural representatives, using both caste identity and the Sabha as a springboard. The community’s role was further strengthened as Mauritius shifted toward ethnic bloc politics, where caste/community associations often played mediator roles between the state and grassroots voters. Several Ravived politicians rose to prominence as Members of Parliament, ministers, and socio-cultural representatives, using both caste identity and the Sabha as a springboard. The community’s role was further strengthened as Mauritius shifted toward ethnic bloc politics, where caste/community associations often played mediator roles between the state and grassroots voters. Electing Dharam Gokhool to the highest constitutional post President of Mauritius is often highlighted as proof of the political empowerment of the Ravived community in Mauritius.

== Notable people ==
- Dharam Gokhool - President of Mauritius.
- Rabindrah Ghurburrun - Former Mauritian diplomat and Former Vice President of Mauritius.
- Atma Doolooa - Mauritian Politician, Former Director of State Trading Corporation Director of Development Works Corporation, Mauritius and Former Advisor at Ministry of Commerce and Cooperatives, Mauritius.
- Satya Faugoo - Mauritian Magistrate and former Minister of Agro Industry and Food Security, Mauritius.
- Beergoonath Ghurburrun Mauritian medicinist, politician and philanthropnist
- Kaviraj Sukon - Minister of Tertiary Education, Science and Research, Mauritius and president of Mauritius Arya Ravived Prtacharini Sabha (MARVPS).

== See also ==
- Chamar
- Chambhar
- Jatav
- Ad-Dharmi
- Guru Ravidas
- Ravidassia
- Ramdasia
- Dera Sach Khand
- Arya Ravived Pracharini Sabha
