= Raveendran (disambiguation) =

Raveendran (1943–2005) was an Indian music director.

Raveendran or Ravindran may also refer to:

- Raveendran, Indian music director in Malayalam films
- P. Ravindran, ex-Minister of Labour, Kerala, India
- Ravindran (actor), Indian film actor
- Ravindran Kannan, Indian computer scientist
- K. Ravindran, Malaysian footballer currently playing for Sarawak FA in Malaysia Super League

== See also ==
- Ravinder, alternative form of the Indian male given name
- Ravindranath, a related name
