= Altlandsberg =

- Town
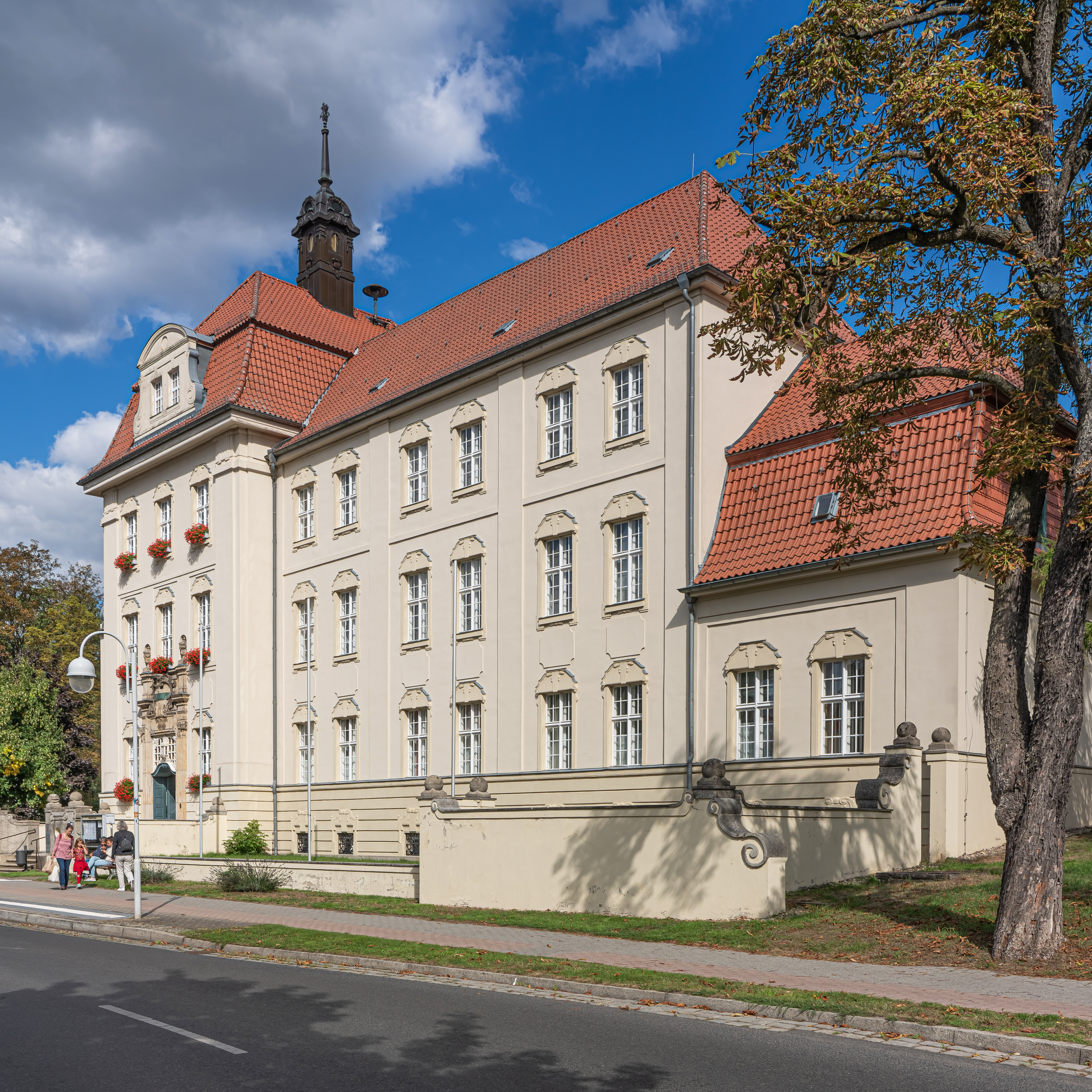
- Town hall

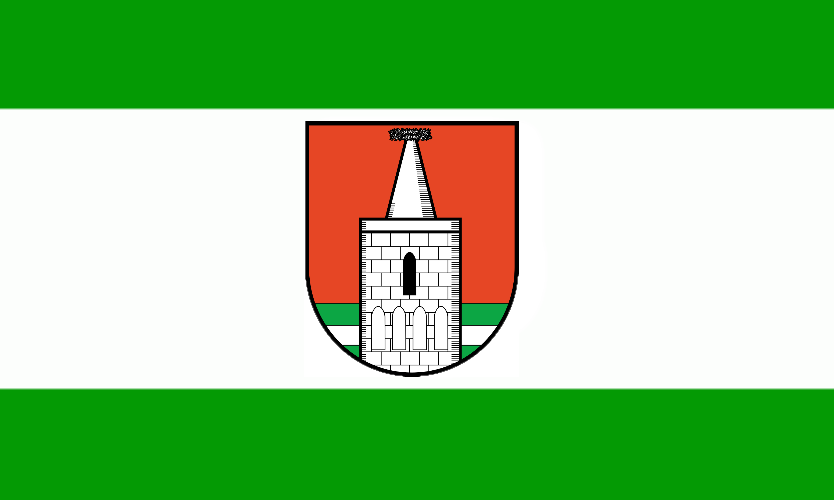
- Flag Coat of arms

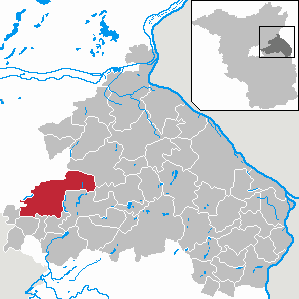
- Location of Altlandsberg within Märkisch-Oderland district
- Interactive map of Altlandsberg
- Location within Germany Location within Brandenburg
- Coordinates: 52°34′00″N 13°43′59″E
- Country: Germany
- State: Brandenburg
- District: Märkisch-Oderland
- Subdivisions: 6 Ortsteile

Government
  - Mayor (2023–31): Michael Töpfer (Ind.)

Area
  - Total: 106.6 km^{2} (41.2 sq mi)
- Elevation: 57 m (187 ft)

Population (2025-12-31)
  - Total: 9,680
  - Density: 90.8/km^{2} (235/sq mi)
- Time zone: UTC+01:00 (CET)
  - Summer (DST): UTC+02:00 (CEST)
- Postal codes: 15345
- Dialling codes: 033438
- Vehicle registration: MOL
- Website: www.altlandsberg.de

Altlandsberg (German pronunciation: [ˈaltlantsˌbɛʁk]) is a historic town in the district of Märkisch-Oderland, in Brandenburg, Germany. It is situated about 22 km (14 mi) east of Berlin.

== History ==
Altlandsberg was first mentioned in a 1230 deed, it was located at the site of a former Slavic (Sprevane) settlement. The area then was resettled in the course of the German Ostsiedlung, promoted both by the Ascanian Margraves of Brandenburg and the rivaling Margraves of Meissen from the House of Wettin. The town's name may refer to Saxon Landsberg Castle and therefore indicate an establishment by the Wettins. In 1245 the tensions rose to an armed conflict, in which the Ascanians maintained their grounds. From that time on Altlandsberg remained with Brandenburg.

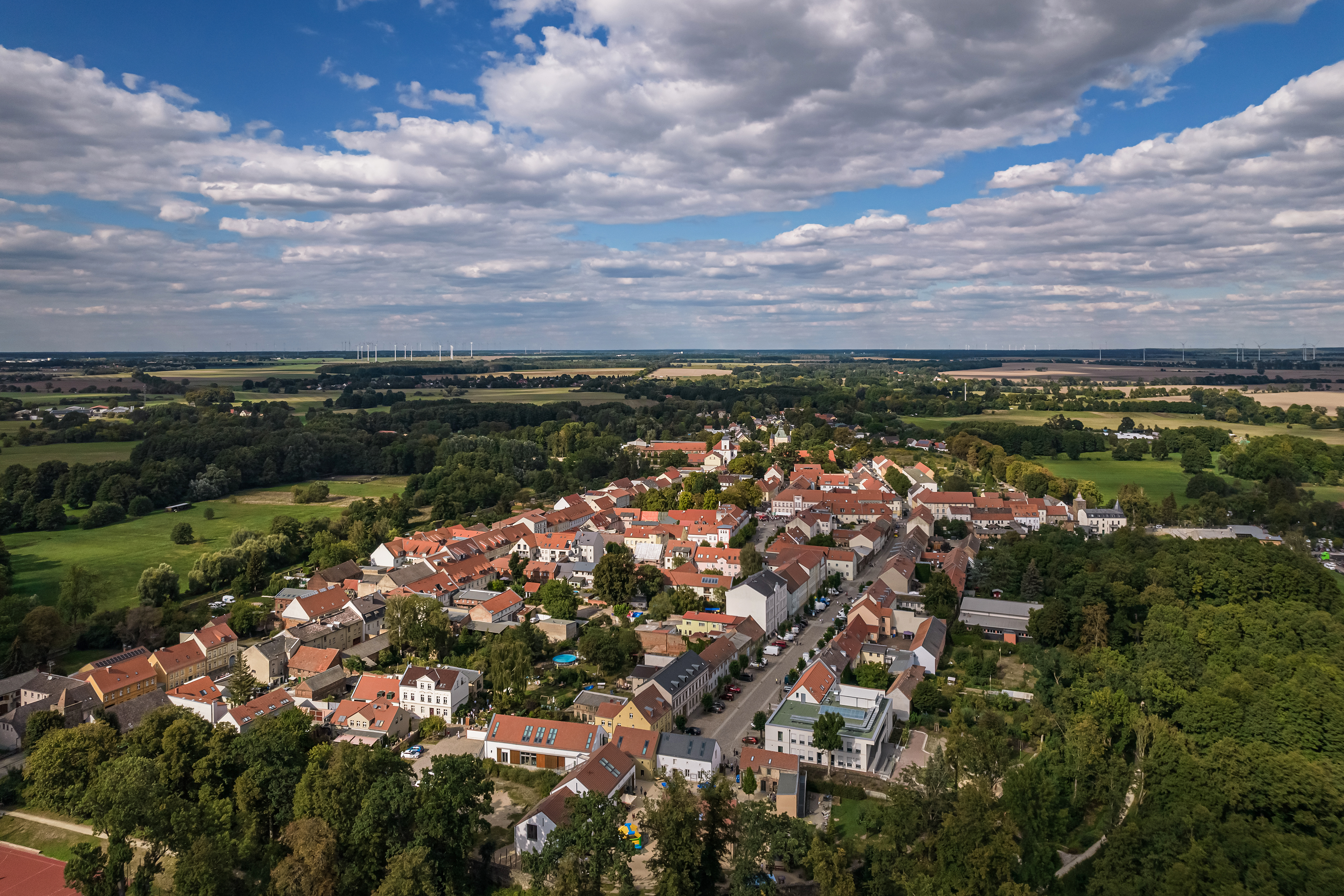
Aerial view of Altlandsberg

The city was laid out at the behest of the Ascanian rulers, their successor Margrave Louis I from the Bavarian House of Wittelsbach even established a monastery of the Servite Order in 1335, which was dissolved during the Protestant Reformation. Altlandsberg was devastated by the Hussites in 1432, it was affected by several town fires and plague epidemics in the 16th century. The medieval town was burnt down completely in 1632 during the Thirty Years' War. A hoard of 7450 gold and silver coins dating from the 14th and early 15th century was discovered in the grounds of the former manor in late 2016. The dates suggest that it was buried in order to protect it during the Hussite wars. It is the largest hitherto found in the state of Brandenburg, and is now being examined in the archeological museum in Brandenburg an der Havel.

== Demography ==
Development of Population since 1875 within the Current Boundaries (Blue Line: Population; Dotted Line: Comparison to Population Development of Brandenburg state; Grey Background: Time of Nazi rule; Red Background: Time of Communist rule)

Recent Population Development and Projections (Population Development before Census 2011 (blue line); Recent Population Development according to the Census in Germany in 2011 (blue bordered line); Official projections for 2005-2030 (yellow line); for 2017-2030 (scarlet line); for 2020-2030 (green line)

Altlandsberg: Population development
within the current boundaries (2020)

Year	Pop.	±% p.a.
1875	3,875	—
1890	4,214	+0.56%
1910	4,437	+0.26%
1925	6,029	+2.07%
1939	8,188	+2.21%
1950	9,326	+1.19%
1964	5,935	−3.18%

Year	Pop.	±% p.a.
1971	5,853	−0.20%
1981	5,043	−1.48%
1985	4,942	−0.50%
1990	4,799	−0.59%
1995	5,265	+1.87%
2000	7,903	+8.46%
2005	8,677	+1.89%

Year	Pop.	±% p.a.
2010	8,806	+0.30%
2015	9,158	+0.79%
2016	9,298	+1.53%
2017	9,371	+0.79%
2018	9,490	+1.27%
2019	9,526	+0.38%
2020	9,662	+1.43%

== Mayors ==
In 1993 Ravindra Gujjula was elected mayor, he was in office till 2003. Manfred Andruleit was the mayor from 2003 till 2007.

In July 2007 Arno Jaeschke (independent) was elected with 54,8 % of the votes. He was reelected in June 2015 with 56,8 % of the votes.

== Sons and daughters of the town ==
- Friedrich Wilhelm Langerhans (1780–1851), architect and Berlin city planner
- Fritz Kunert (1850–1931), member of parliament (SPD)
- Erasmus Schöfer (1931-2022), writer
- Herbert Graedtke (born 1941), theater actor and director
- Dagmar Enkelmann (born 1956), member of parliament (Die Linke ("The Left"))
- Paul Palm (1913-1990), Wehrmacht tank commander and German Cross in Gold recipient

== Other personalities who are associated with the town ==
- Frederick I (Prussia)(1657–1713), first king of Prussia, was educated in Altlandsberg
- Gujjula Ravindra Reddy (born 1954), 1993-2003 honorary mayor of Altlandsberg

== Gallery ==
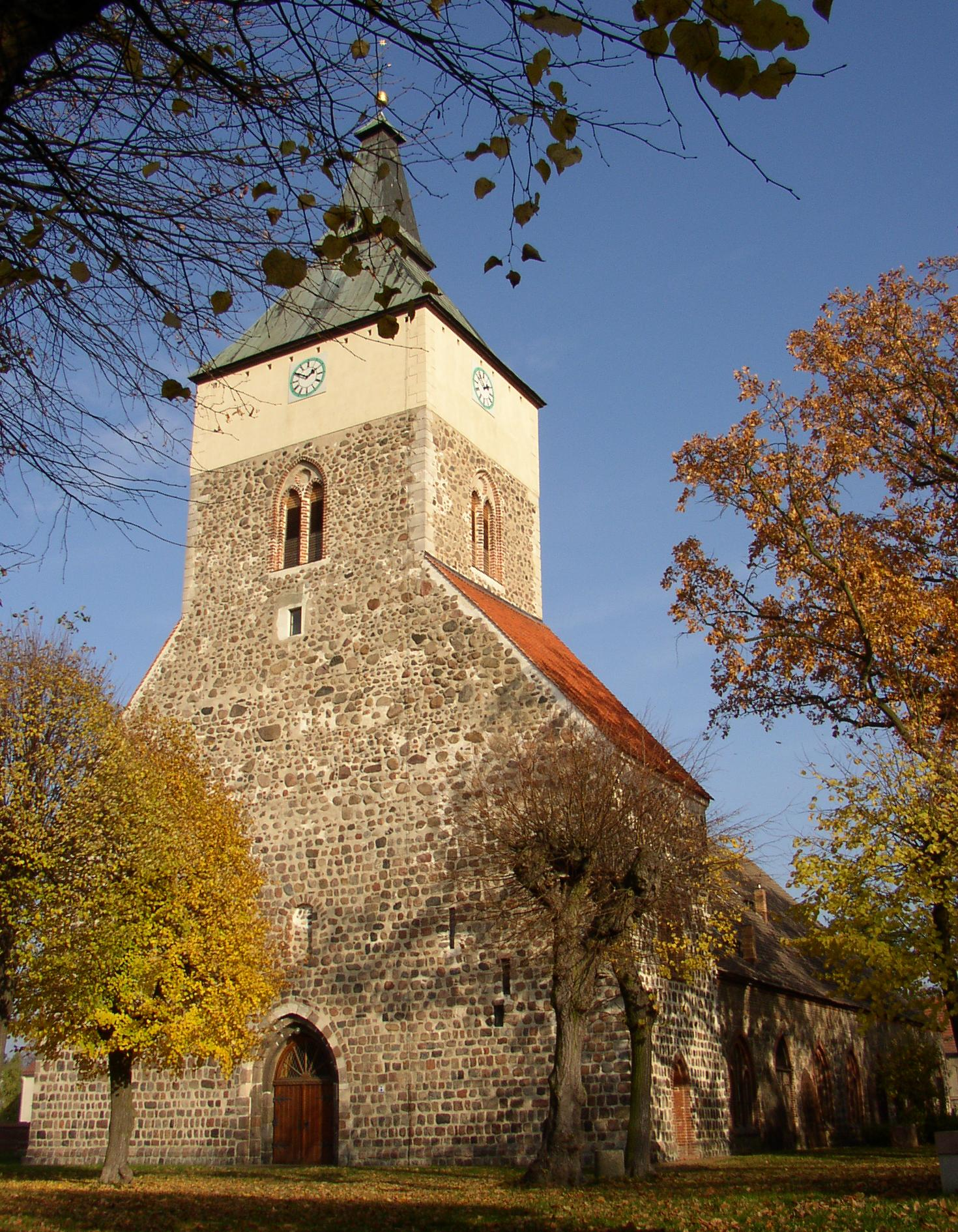
Altlandsberg Church

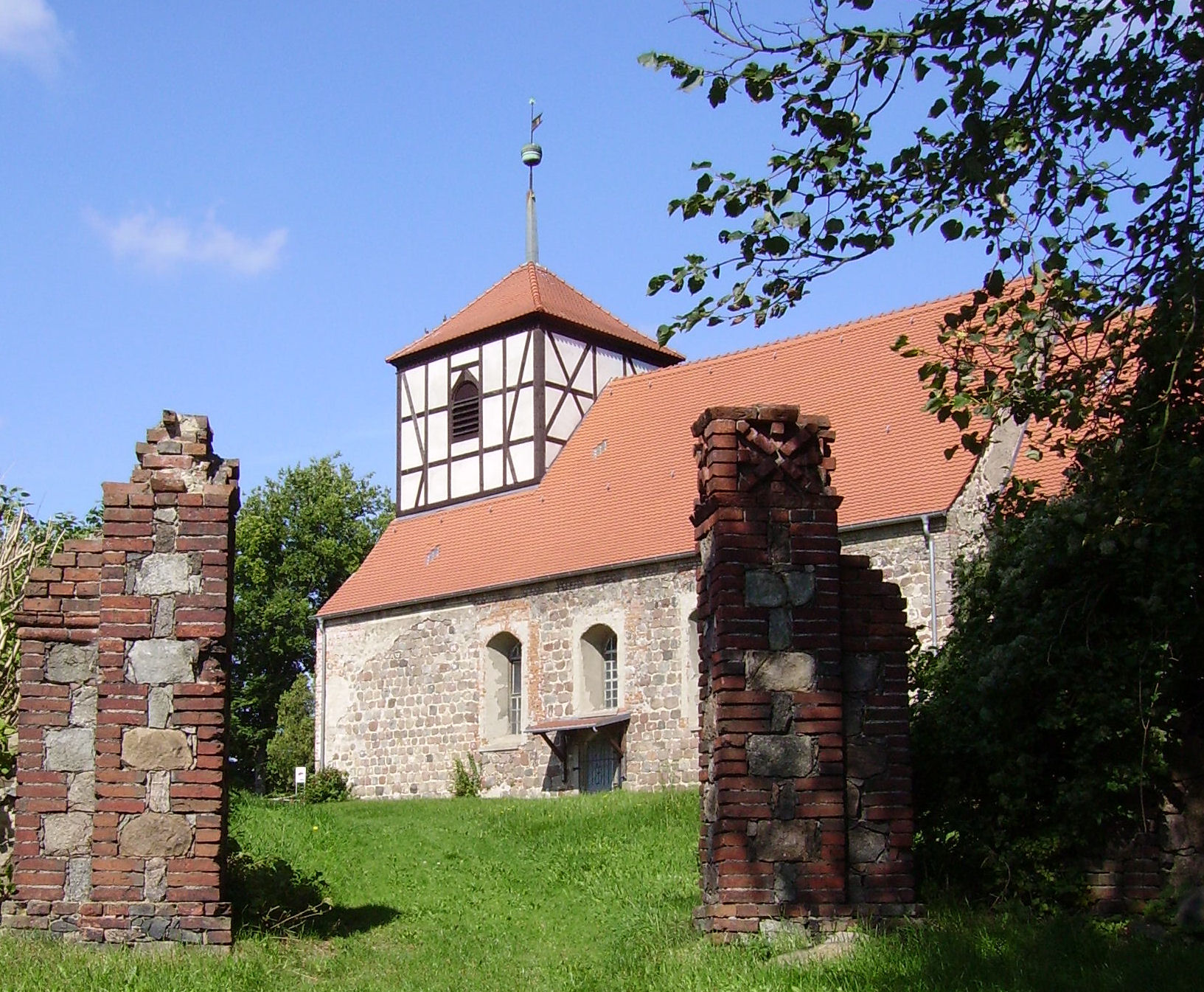
Gielsdorf church

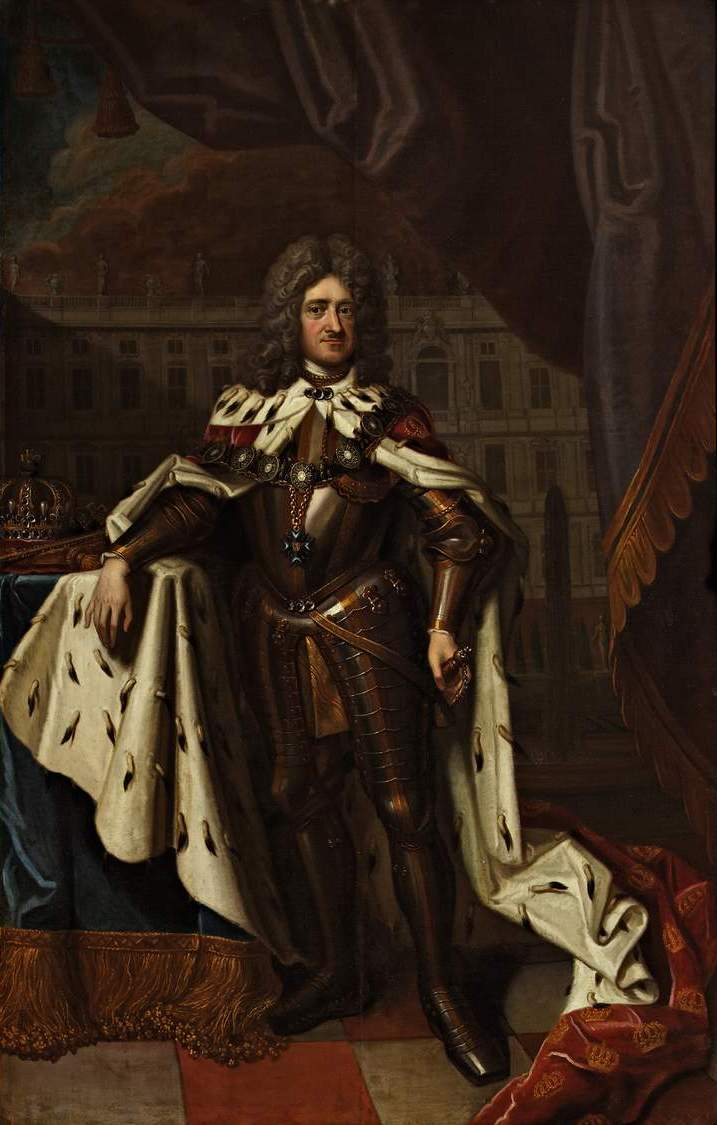
Friedrich I of Prussia ca 1701
