= Beergoonath Ghurburrun =

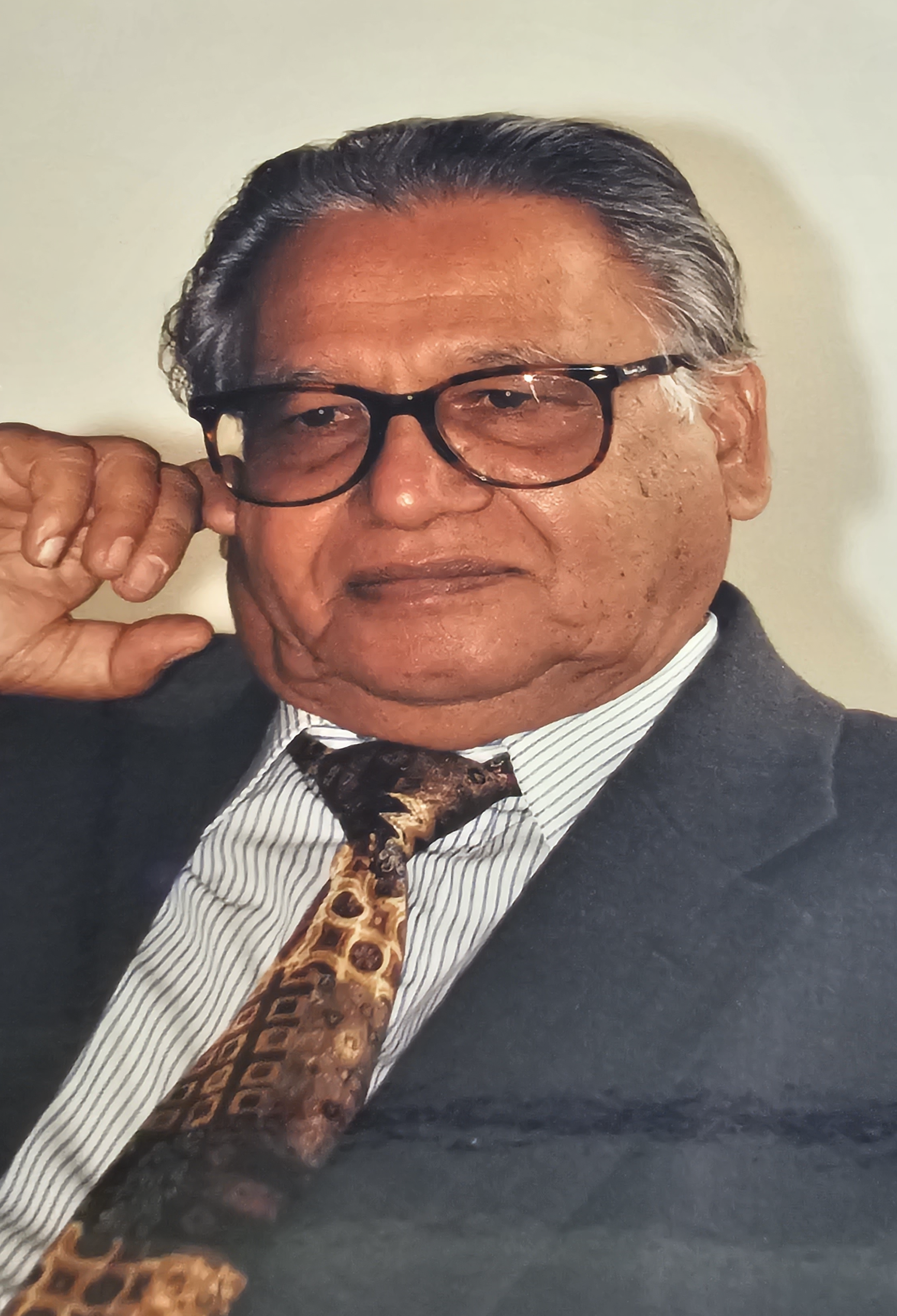
- Dr. Beergonath Ghnurburrun in 2013
- Born: 14 January 1928; St. Julien Village, British Mauritius
- Died: 17 November 2013 (aged 85); Port Louis, Mauritius
- Occupations: Chief Minister of Mauritius
- Years active: 1963–1991
- Spouse: Dr. Prabhavathi Venkatasamy
- Children: Nishtha Ghurburrun
- Awards: Legion of Honour – (1991)

Beergoonath Ghurburrun LH GOSK (1928–2013) was a Mauritian physician, politician, and philanthropist who served as Mauritius's Chief Minister, Deputy Prime Minister, Minister of Social Security, Minister of Commerce and Industry, and Minister of Labour and Industrial Relations.

== Early life ==
Ghurburrun was born on 14 January 1928, in St. Julien Village into the Ravived family, whose origin lies in Indian caste Chamar.

His academic pursuits led him to France, where he pursued medical studies at the Faculté de médecine de Bordeaux and the Faculté de médecine de Paris. Upon returning to Mauritius, he made contributions to the medical field and later ventured into the political arena.

== Political career ==
Joining the Mauritius Labour Party in 1960, Ghurburrun played a pivotal role in the country's journey to independence. His political career saw him assume various significant roles, including serving as the island's only chief minister and Deputy Prime Minister. Notably, he held ministerial positions and was recognized for his commitment to public welfare. In 1956, during her visit to Mauritius, he had the opportunity to meet the Princess Margaret.

Ghurburrun started in public service with his nomination as a Member of the Legislative Council in November 1963, a role he held until December of the same year. His re-nomination as a Member of the Legislative Assembly in 1965 paved the way for his appointment as Minister of Social Security, a position in which he served until August 1967.

In 1968 Ghurburrun assumed the mantle of Minister of Commerce and Industry. In 1969 he became the Minister of Communications and in 1971 the Minister of Labour and Social Security. Ghurburrun was severely blamed for his inaction by judge Droopnath Ramphul who was appointed by the government as the mediator to resolve the intense labour strikes which paralysed the transport network in 1971 as well as the rest of the Mauritian economy soon afterwards.

From March 1974 to May 1976, Ghurburrun assumed the mantle of Minister of Labour and Industrial Relations.

Ghurburrun's contributions extended beyond ministerial roles, as evidenced by his candidacy in the 1976 and 1982 General Elections. He was appointment as Minister of Health from January 1980 to June 1982, following the death of Mahesh Teelock.

The zenith of Ghurburrun's political trajectory materialized during his tenure as Minister of Economic Planning and Development from March 1984 to August 1987. His stewardship precipitated an economic reform, culminating in unprecedented growth that garnered recognition from the Economic Development Institute of The World Bank report 9089, authored by Ravi Gulhati and Raj Nallari. He received the Officier de l'ordre National Malgache in 1969, Commadeur de l'Ordre Du Croissant Vert Des Comores in 1990 and National Order of the Legion of Honour of France in 1990.

He was involved in social work initiatives and support for charitable institutions, such as the Gandhi Breedh Ashram in Petit Raffray.

Ghurburrun's brother Sir Rabindrah Ghurburrun (1928–2008) was the first Vice President of Mauritius from 1992 to 1997. A lawyer by profession, he did a diploma at the University of Oxford. He was also the first High Commissioner of Mauritius to India. Then Prime Minister Indira Gandhi described him as behaving like the last Maharaja of India. He died at the age of 79 in Paris.

== Personal life ==
He married Dr. Prabhavathi Venkatasamy, a pathologist who was the first Laureate of Queen Elizabeth College and then went to University College Dublin for her medical studies. They had one daughter, Nishtha.
