= Erasmus Schöfer =

German writer (1931–2022)

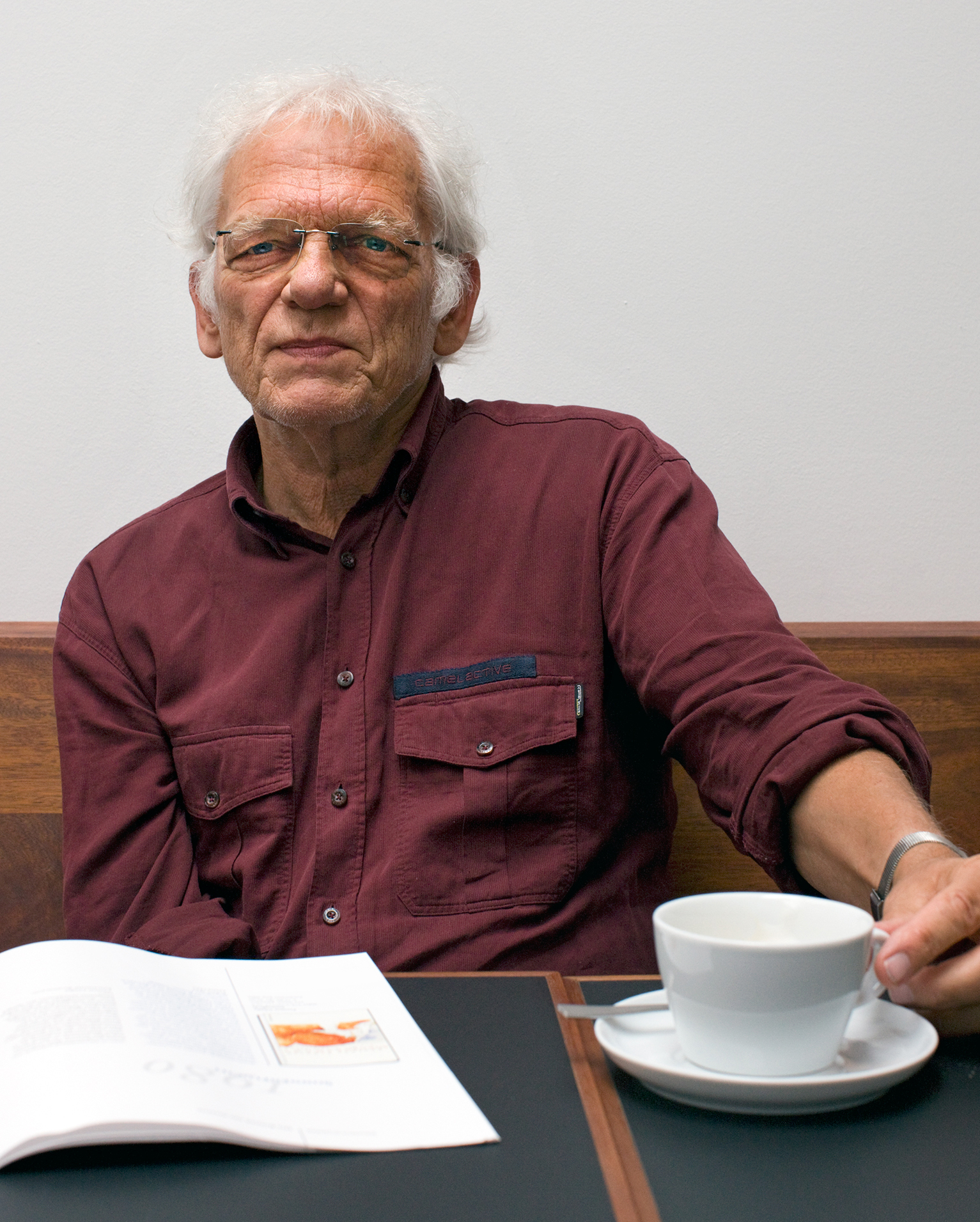
- Schöfer in 2008
- Born: 4 June 1931; Altlandsberg, Germany
- Died: 7 June 2022 (aged 91); Cologne, Germany
- Occupation: Writer
- Website: www.erasmusschoefer.de

Erasmus Schöfer (4 June 1931 – 7 June 2022) was a German writer. He was a member of the German Communist Party and took part in resistance against the Vietnam War and rearmament, among others, and became the chronicler of resistance in Germany in his main work, a tetralogy of novels, Die Kinder des Sisyfos (The Children of Sisyphus). It is based on recent history, from the protests of 1968 in West Germany up to the political and social developments of the 1980s until German reunification. He also wrote poetry, stories, plays and audio plays.

== Career ==
Schöfer was born on 4 June 1931 in Altlandsberg and grew up in Berlin. After studying in Berlin for several semesters, he worked for three years in production companies in Berlin and Cologne, including Osram and Schwank. In 1955, he returned to studies of German, philosophy and linguistics, now in Cologne and including one year of research in Paris. In 1962, Schöfer received his doctorate in Bonn from the linguist Leo Weisgerber. His thesis was titled Die Sprache Heideggers (Heidegger's language), and was published as a book by Neske.

Schöfer then worked, first in Freiburg and then in Munich, as a freelance correspondent of several newspapers, focused on cultural topics. He also wrote audio plays for broadcasters in both parts of Germany. He wrote three plays which premiered in Freiburg, Dortmund, and Bruchsal.

Schöfer's political engagement began with resistance against the Vietnam War. He took part in major protests. He became known in Germany when he and other authors founded the work circle Werkkreis Literatur der Arbeitswelt in 1970. The authors encouraged literature focused on the work place. He served as its speaker until 1973, and was editor of many of the collected writings. He was a member of the German Communist Party. In the 1980s, Schöfer lived in Greece for several years. In 1980, he became member of the PEN Centre Germany.

Schöfer published his main work, a tetralogy of novels Die Kinder des Sisyfos, between 2001 and 2008. It deals, as a Zeitroman, with the history of the Protests of 1968 in West Germany, developing biographies of characters in the context of the political and social battles of the 1970s and 1980s.

== Work ==
Schöfer's first book of Erzählungen (stories) was published by Fischer in 1979. A novella, "Der Sturm" (The storm), appeared by Kiepenheuer & Witsch, more stories entitled Flieg Vogel stirb (Fly bird die) were published by Weltkreis-Verlag. After one year in Greece, his first novel was called Tod in Athen (Death in Athens), published in 1986.

From 2001, the volumes of his epic tetralogy Die Kinder des Sisyfos were published by Dittrich Verlag in Berlin. The work deals, as a Zeitroman, with the history of the Protests of 1968 in West Germany, developing biographies of characters in the context of the political and social battles of the 1970s and 1980s, from the protests of 1968 to German reunification. His invented characters, including teachers, actors and workers, deal with large demonstrations against rearmament, the Vietnam War, nuclear power plants and plant shutdowns. The four volumes were Ein Frühling irrer Hoffnung (A spring of mad hope, 2001), Zwielicht (Twilight, 2004), Sonnenflucht (Sun's flight, 2005), and Winterdämmerung (Winter's dusk, 2008). He added a fifth volume as an index to political and social background facts. The Klartext-Verlag in Essen published a collection of his essays, Diesseits von Gut und Böse in 2011, and a selection of his audio plays, Na hörn Sie mal!, in 2012.

Schöfer was awarded the Gustav-Regler-Preis in 2008, for Sisyfos. His literary legacy (Vorlass) is held by the Fritz Hüser Institute in Dortmund.

== Personal life ==
Schöfer was married to Christiane Bruhn, who was engaged at theatres in Cologne and Neuss in the 1970s and 1980s. They had four children.

He died in Cologne on 7 June 2022, three days after his 91st birthday.
