= Arya Ravived Pracharini Sabha =

Arya Ravived Pracharini Sabha, Mauritius
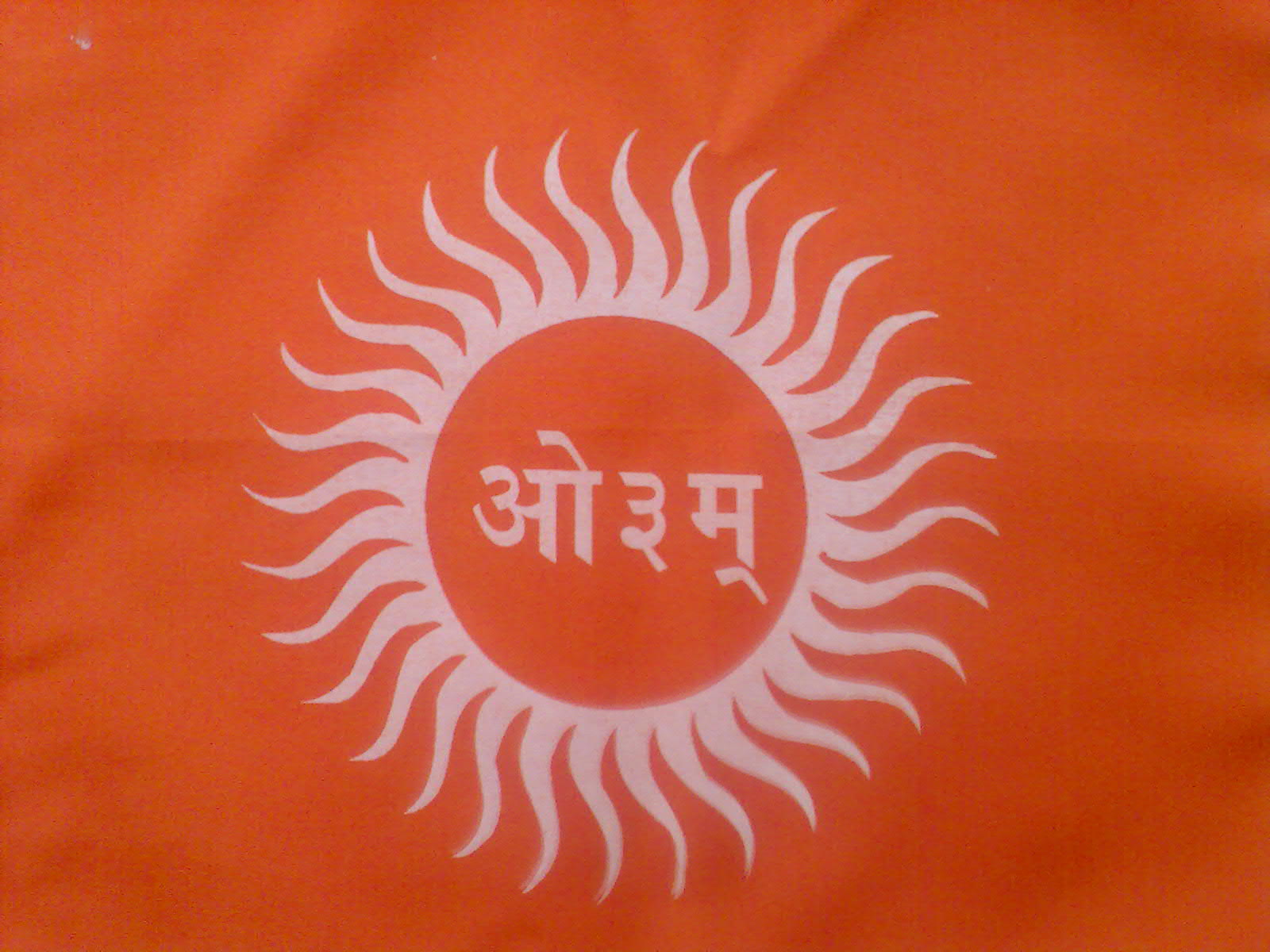
- Aum – The Symbol of Arya Samaj
- Formation: 1935
- Type: Religious
- Purpose: Educational • Religious Studies • Spirituality
- Headquarters: Arya Ravived Pracharini Sabha, Port Louis
- Location: Mauritius
- Founder: Rambissoon Beeharry, Outimdass Mungra, Sagar Ghurburrun
- Affiliations: Arya Samaj
- Website: www.marvps.org

The Arya Ravived Pracharini Sabha (MARVPS) is a socio-religious and cultural organisation based in Port Louis, Mauritius. The organization is guided by the principles of the Arya Samaj, which include propagating Vedic philosophy as interpreted by Swami Dayanand Saraswati and a focus on social reform, religious equality, spreading awareness, fostering education (especially in Hindi and Sanskrit), and preserving cultural identity. It runs various activities: Vedic prayers (yajna), seminars, lectures (pravachans), satsangs, festivals, maintenance of religious priesthood, a library, teaching centers, a Matri Sabha for women's participation, etc.

== Origin of Sabha ==
During the 19th century (1834 onward), many Dalits, the majority Chamars (leather-working caste), migrated to Mauritius as indentured laborers under British rule. Those who were followers of Guru Ravidas began identifying collectively as Ravived to affirm a dignified identity. With time the term 'Ravived' became the preferred name in Mauritius to distance themselves from the derogatory slur 'Chamar.' After migrating to Mauritius, significant numbers of Chamar people joined the Mauritius Arya Samaj in the hope that it would help them to be free from the curse of casteism, as it was claimed by the leaders of the Arya Samaj. But later, upper-caste Arya Samajis started building separate halls for themselves and Chamars for prayer within the same shrine to avoid Arya Samaj being labelled as a Chamar religion, which led to the establishment of Arya Ravived Pracharini Sabha in 1935. The origin of 'Arya Ravived Pracharini Sabha' lies in three different words. The word 'Arya' comes from the reformist ideas of the Arya Samaj, which emphasized Vedic teachings and social upliftment, and 'Ravived' comes from Guru Ravidas (a Bhakti saint from the Chamar caste), and 'Pracharini Sabha' meaning 'organization for spreading awareness.'

== Activities ==
Since its inception, MARVPS has played a role in preserving and teaching the Hindi language among Mauritian Ravived Hindus, promoting equality by organizing events dedicated to Dr. B. R. Ambedkar in collaboration with the Indian High Commission, running cultural events, and engaging in community welfare.

Over time it has grown its branch network: at present it has many branches (over 130 according to its website) across Mauritius, which organize events, festivals, yajnas, etc.

== Political significance ==
In Mauritius, the Raviveds (local term for Ravidassias) historically faced caste discrimination, which led them to organize under the Arya Ravived Pracharini Sabha. Through the Sabha, they mobilized socially and religiously, which later translated into political leverage. Ravived leaders used their Sabha network to mobilize voters, making the community a key vote bank, especially in constituencies where lower-caste Hindus were numerous. After independence in 1968, Ravived leaders gained space in the mainstream political scene, especially through alliances with the Labour Party and later also with the Mauritian Militant Movement (MMM) and other parties.

Several Ravived politicians rose to prominence as Members of Parliament, ministers, and socio-cultural representatives, using both caste identity and the Sabha as a springboard. The community's role was further strengthened as Mauritius shifted toward ethnic bloc politics, where caste/community associations often played mediator roles between the state and grassroots voters. Electing Dharam Gokhool to the highest constitutional post is often highlighted as proof of the political empowerment of the Ravived community in Mauritius.

== Controversies ==
=== Allegations of Mismanagement of Funds/ICAC Investigation (2017) ===
In November 2017, a member of MARVPS, Rajesh Narrain Gutteea, filed a complaint with the Independent Commission Against Corruption (ICAC) in Mauritius. In his complaint, he raised suspicion about government funds received as a subsidy by MARVPS. He also raised questions about costs and transparency around the construction of the Sunrise Hall in Belle-Mare. The complainant alleged that other members suggested involving other authorities (like the Financial Services Commission and police) to look into the association's financial practices.

=== Issue Over State Land / State Grant / Vehicle Subsidies / Tax Exemptions ===
There are allegations against Pandit Sooryadeo Sungkur (a leader of MARVPS) in connection with “l’octroi d’un terrain de l’État pour la construction d’une cafétéria sur la plage de Trou-aux-Biches.” That is, the granting of state land for building a cafeteria on a public beach, which drew criticism.

Sabha's leaders allegedly demanded an increase in subsidies and changes in tax exemptions. In a speech during the 80th anniversary of MARVPS, the president had requested increased subsidies to socio-cultural organizations and full tax exemptions on vehicles used by such bodies. The Prime Minister Navin Ramgoolam at the time agreed to some concessions. Some critics saw these as questions of propriety, political favor, or potential for misuse.

== See also ==
- Guru Ravidas
- Ravidassia
- Chamar
