= Open University of Mauritius =

Public university in Mauritius

- Motto: My University always with me
- Type: Public
- Established: 2012; 14 years ago
- Location: Réduit, Moka District, Mauritius; 20°14′0.02″S 57°29′57.16″E
- Founder Director-General: Dr Kaviraj Sharma Sukon
- Website: www.open.ac.mu

The Open University of Mauritius (OU) is a public university in Mauritius. It offer programmes leading to undergraduate, and postgraduate degrees through open distance learning. OU's headquarters are located in Réduit, Moka.

The OU was established under the Open University of Mauritius Act No. 2 of 2010, proclaimed in July 2012. Its first founder Director-General is Dr Kaviraj Sharma Sukon.

The first graduation ceremony was held on 8 July 2015. The guest was the French-Mauritian Nobel Prize in Literature laureate Dr Jean-Marie Gustave Le Clézio.

It was the first public university in Mauritius to be ISO-certified as from 7 July 2015. The university was re-certified in November 2018 from ISO 9001:2008 to ISO 9001:2015.

It is the only public university that has experienced a continuous positive growth as evidenced by the findings of the report of the Tertiary Education Commission.

== See also ==
- Education in Mauritius
- List of tertiary institutions in Mauritius
- Tertiary Education Commission www.tec.mu
