= Gujjula Ravindra Reddy =

Indian politician (born 1954)

Gujjula Ravindra Reddy (born 1954) is a former member of the state parliament of Brandenburg and former mayor of Altlandsberg. He was born in Neredupalli (village), Pedacherlopalli (mandal) Kanigiri, Prakasam District, Andhra Pradesh, India.

Reddy visited areas devastated by the 2004 Indian Ocean earthquake. In four villages near Avanigadda, Andhra Pradesh tsunami shelters doubling as school buildings were constructed using charitable donations from the German Government and organisations such as Lions Club, Altlandsberg, Solidarity Service International (SODI) and Aktion Deutschland Hilft and Berlin-Lichtenberg.
