= Arya Samaj in Mauritius =

Arya Samaj Mauritius
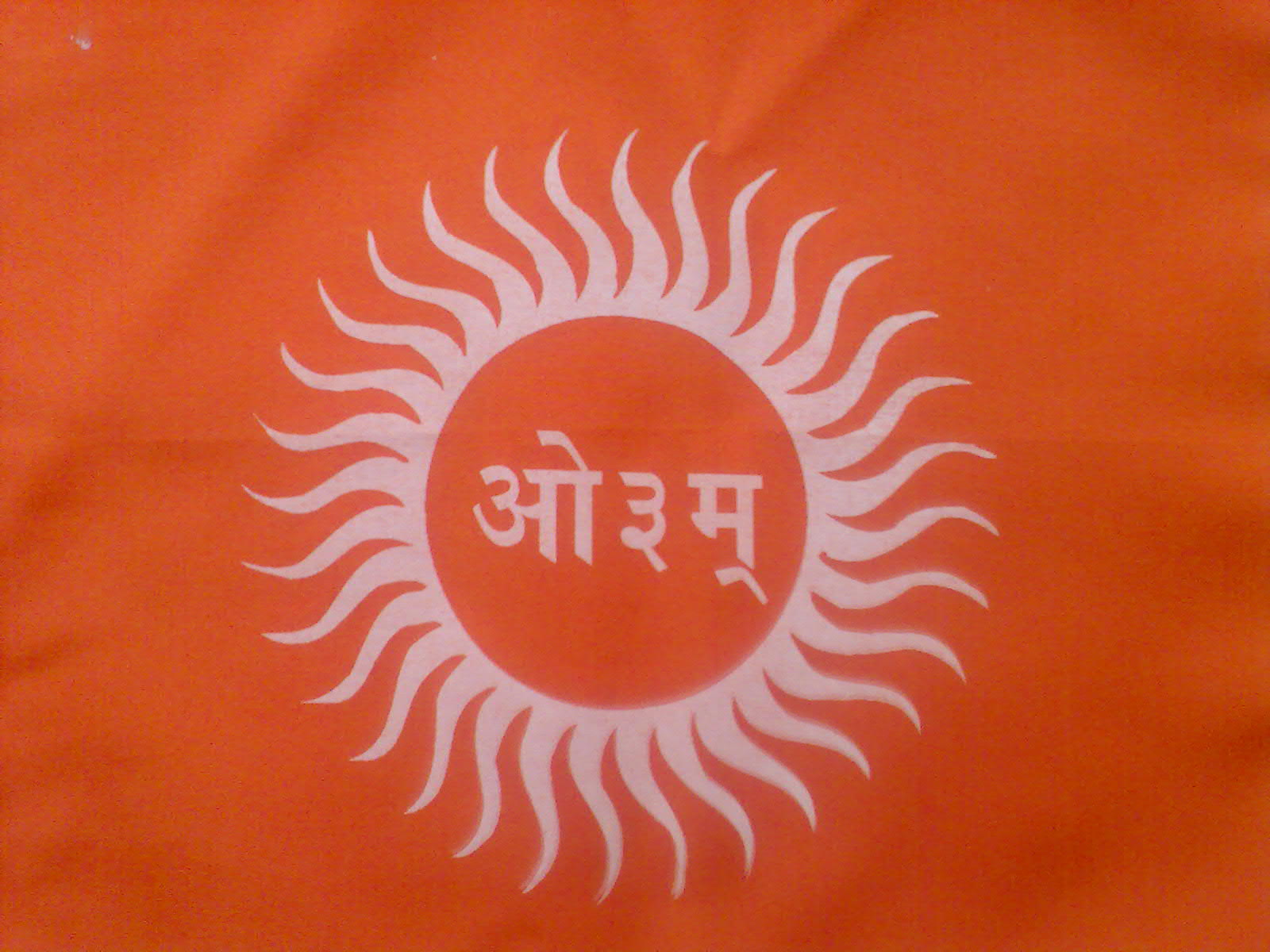
- Aum – The Symbol of Arya Samaj
- Formation: 10 April 1875
- Type: Religious
- Purpose: Educational • Religious Studies • Spirituality
- Headquarters: Arya Pratinidhi Sabha, Port Louis
- Location: Mauritius
- Founder: Bekarilal Singh, Lala Khemlall, Goorooparsad Duljeet
- Affiliations: Arya Samaj
- Website: www.aryasabhamauritius.com

Arya Samaj (Sanskrit ārya samāja आर्य समाज "Arya Society") is a Hindu reform movement in Mauritius. Established in 1911, the Arya Paropkarini Sabha was officially registered in 1913. Since its creation Arya Samaj has had a great influence on the religious, social, educational and political lives of the people of Indian origin on the island. It has endeavoured to uphold the principles and ideals set forth by Maharishi Dayanand and his reformist movement. Some of the more notable ideals are women parity and free access to education. It has provided Hindus with a choice of progressive Hinduism, has promoted education with particular emphasis on Hindi and established orphanages, primary schools, colleges and tertiary institution.

== History ==
The teachings of Arya Samaj was first introduced to Mauritius in 1897 by a group soldiers from the British Indian Army based there. On their departure in 1902, they left a copy of Satyarth Prakash and Sanskar Vidhi which became an inspiration for the establishment of the first Arya Samaj at Curepipe Road in 1903 by Bekarilal Singh, Khemlall Totta Lallah and Goorooparsad Duljeet. The trio were concerned at the deteriorating situation of the Hindu community in Mauritius, and despite early setback the Arya Samaj soon gained popular support.

The arrival of Manilal Doctor in 1907 provided impetus to the movement. Manilal, a lawyer by profession, published a regular Hindi magazine for the Arya Samaj. On 8 May 1911, another Arya Samaj was formed in Port Louis. The Samajs then combined to form the Arya Pratinidhi Sabha of Mauritius. The arrival of Chiranjiva Bharadwaj on 15 December 1911 provided further impetus to the Arya Samaj movement in Mauritius. Under his guidance Arya Samajs were established at places where Indians had settled in large numbers, such as Vacoas, Triolet, Labourdonnais, Pamplemousses and Rivière des anguilles. He conducted evening Hindi classes and toured villages to spread the message of the Vedas. Following opposition to the registration of the Arya Pratinidhi Sabha by the Government, Bharadwaj registered the Arya Paropkarini Sabha in 1912 with headquarters in Port Louis where a new building was constructed.

The Arya Samaj sent young men to India to be trained as preachers and organised preachers from India to visit Mauritius. One such preacher was Swami Swantantranand who arrived in Mauritius in 1914. He further promoted the learning of Hindi and improved the Arya Patrika, a newspaper in Hindi which was the voice of the Arya Samaj. He returned to India in 1916 with Arya Samj well established and his work was furthered by Pandit Kashinath Kistoe, who had been sent to India for religious training. Kistoe took part in public debates with the orthodox Hindus but his greatest contribution was the establishment of Hindi schools. In 1924, the Arya Vedic School was established and subsequently two other primary schools were established. The DAV College of Port Louis was also established. Another preacher, Swami Vijayanand Saraswati arrived in February 1926 and used the latest audio visual aids to help with his lectures. He organised village processions and started shuddhi (conversion) ceremonies.

== Splits with the Arya Samaj ==
In 1927 another Arya Samaj body, known as the Arya Pratinidhi Sabha was formed, supported by some of the veterans of the Arya Samaj. The new body obtained recognition from the Sarvadeshik Arya Pratinidhi Sabha (World Council of Arya Samaj) in New Delhi and grew popular. The fiftieth anniversary of the death of Swami Dayanand was celebrated in 1933 separately by the two Arya Samaj organisations. In 1934, another group broke away from the Paropkarni Sabha and formed the Arya Ravived Pracharini Sabha. Despite these divisions, the work of Arya Samaj, particularly in promoting Vedic teachings and the Hindi language, continued until 1950 when the Sarvadeshik Arya Pratinidhi Sabha sent Swami Swantantranand Saraswati to restore unity by diplomacy. After protracted negotiations the Arya Paropkarini Sabha and the Arya Pratinidhi Sabha agreed to merge to form the Arya Sabha Mauritius, but the Arya Ravived Pracharini Sabha remained a separate body. Swami Swantantranand Saraswati returned to India and at the first election of the executive committee of the new Sabha all the former members of the Arya Pratinidhi Sabha lost their seats. They then reconstituted the Arya Pratinidhi Sabha in 1954. Sarvadeshik Arya Pratinidhi Sabha intervened once again and sent Swami Dhruvanand Saraswati who managed to persuade the Arya Pratinidhi Sabha to merge with the Arya Sabha Mauritius in 1958. In 1970, the Arya Sabha Mauritius and the Arya Ravi Ved Pracharini Sabha jointly celebrated the sixtieth anniversary of the establishment of Arya Samaj in Mauritius.

== Promotion of education ==
The Arya Samaj vigorously promoted the teaching of Hindi and the first Hindi school was opened by the Arya Samaj in Mauritius on 18 July 1918. Gradually other subjects were introduced and the school became a government-aided institution. In 1920 there were 75 Hindi schools in Mauritius and following pressure from the Arya Samaj, Asian languages were included in the curriculum of schools in Mauritius. The teaching of Hindi gained impetus when another Aryan Vedic School was established in 1938. A teacher training school for Hindi teachers was also established. Various Arya Samajs conducted three hundred evening Hindi schools at both primary and secondary level. The Arya Samaj worked with other Indian organisations to pressure the Government to include the teaching of Asian languages in secondary schools. The establishment of D.A.V. College by the Arya Sabha Mauritius on 11 January 1965, satisfied some of the need for Hindi education at secondary level before it became an optional subject in all public and free private secondary schools of Mauritius.

== Women and Arya Samaj ==
The Arya Samaj believes in providing equal opportunity to women and the first steps in this direction was taken in Mauritius in 1912, when a women's association was formed in Vacoas to promote education among women. In 1931, a Mahila Mandal (Women's Association) was formed in Port Louis on the initiative of the Arya Pratinidhi Sabha. In 1933 a conference for women was held, attended by over five hundred women from all parts of Mauritius. The Mahila Mandal held a conference in Port Louis in 1965 and again in 1970. At present there are fifty Mahila Sabhas in Mauritius, which encourage vedic prayer, provide education and encourage women writers.

== Other activities ==
In 1967 the Arya Sabha of Mauritius established the Arya Yuvak Sangh (Arya Youth Union) to promote Indian culture amongst Indian youth. There are twenty branches and conferences are held regularly.

The Arya Samaj also runs an orphanage, established in 1940.
