= Ravgen =

Ravgen Inc. is a privately owned biotech company founded in 2000 by Chairman and C.E.O. Dr. Ravinder Dhallan. Ravgen Inc. performs research in the prenatal diagnostic field and has developed non-invasive prenatal diagnosis testing for Down Syndrome.

== Publications and research ==
Ravgen has published peer-reviewed articles on genetic research in publications such as the Journal of the American Medical Association in 2004, The Lancet in 2007, and the New England Journal of Medicine in 2012. In addition, Ravgen has received some acclaim from its research on non-invasive prenatal DNA testing.
