= Ravinder Dhallan =

Ravinder (Rav) Dhallan is the chairman and chief executive officer of Ravgen.

== Early life and education ==
Dhallan earned an M.D. and a Ph.D. in biomedical engineering at Johns Hopkins University, then began a residency in radiation oncology at Massachusetts General Hospital. Later, after deciding to found the startup firm Ravgen, he studied business at the University of Pennsylvania's Wharton School, receiving an MBA in 2007.

== Career ==
According to a 2007 CNN profile, after Dhallan had begun his residency and fathered two children, his wife suffered two miscarriages, which caused him to be “struck by how little information was available to women who experienced complications during pregnancy....so he resolved to invent a better prenatal diagnostic exam.” Amniocentesis provides 100% accurate results, but has a one-in-200 risk of causing a miscarriage and cannot be carried out until 15 or 18 weeks into the pregnancy; existing non-invasive prenatal screenings, meanwhile, have low accuracy rates. As an alternative to these procedures, Dhallan developed and patented Rapid Analysis of Variations in the Genome, which involves drawing two tablespoons of blood from the expectant mother, isolating fetal DNA cells, and checking them for chromosome 21, the marker for Down syndrome. The method is 99% accurate and can be performed eight weeks into a pregnancy.

In order to develop and exploit his procedure, Dhallan founded and incorporated the biotech startup firm RavGen. Meanwhile, he left oncology to do a residency in emergency medicine at York Hospital in York, Pennsylvania. He then became an attending physician in the Department of Emergency Medicine at Holy Cross Hospital in Silver Spring, Maryland. According to CNN, he discovered that “the emergency room turned out to be great training for the daily high-wire act of running a startup. 'You get perspective,' says Dhallan. 'Once you've dealt with life and death day in and day out, other problems seem trivial.' The ER also helped him develop strong leadership skills. 'If someone has been shot six times, everyone is looking at the physician's response,' Dhallan says. 'If I didn't look confident, then everyone would lose confidence.'”

=== RavGen ===
RavGen is based in Columbia, Maryland. Dhallan founded it in 2000 after raising $15 million for research and development. According to its website, it was founded “with the goal of changing the paradigm of prenatal diagnostics.” While the current paradigm focuses on Down syndrome testing, “there are many other genetic conditions and reasons to offer patients prenatal diagnosis,” among them cystic fibrosis and sickle-cell anemia. Dhallan and his colleagues have developed “safe, noninvasive tests to expand upon the current options available to patients.”

In an article for the Journal of the American Medical Association, “Methods to Increase the Percentage of Free Fetal DNA Recovered From the Maternal Circulation,” Dhallan and his colleagues maintained that “An alternative to existing methods for prenatal diagnosis is to use fetal cells and fetal DNA that exist in the maternal circulation.” Dhallan's method of non-invasive prenatal testing was described in a 2007 article in The Lancet (Lancet. 2007; 369:474-81). “Currently,” explained a Lancet press release, “available tests for prenatal diagnosis of chromosomal abnormalities—eg, trisomy 21, which causes Down’s syndrome—are limited by several factors. Screening tests, such as ultrasound, are non-invasive, but diagnosis requires further invasive testing. Invasive diagnostic tests, such as amniocentesis and chorionic villus sampling, are associated with risks to the pregnancy.”

Now, however, Dhallan and his colleagues had extracted fetal DNA from blood samples of pregnant women and examined them for chromosomal abnormalities “by analysing an array of single nucleotide polymorphisms (SNPs, pronounced “snips”)—tiny variations in the DNA sequence of individuals. The researchers established the ratio of SNPs on different chromosomes, which enabled them to determine whether the fetus had chromosomal abnormalities. Of the 60 samples tested, the technique identified the number of chromosomes correctly in 58, including two cases of trisomy 21. Although one case of trisomy 21 was not identified, and one normal sample was incorrectly identified as being trisomy 21, the researchers stress that this is a preliminary study, and that further trials are needed to fine tune the technique.” The Lancet article was followed by a letter in which Dhallan replied to critics questioning the value of the procedure. The Washington Post and Los Angeles Times reported on Dhallan's innovation in February 2007.

Ravgen has developed a new paternity test, described in a 2012 letter by Dhallan and several of his colleagues at Ravgen that was published in the New England Journal of Medicine (NEJM. 2012; 366:1743-1745). In the letter, entitled “A Non-Invasive Test to Determine Paternity in Pregnancy,” Dhallan and his team wrote that their “approach shows that noninvasive prenatal paternity testing can be performed within the first trimester with the use of a maternal blood sample.” A June 2012 New York Times article discussed Raygen's new paternity test, noting that it had been used to establish a motive in a 2008 murder case in Lancaster County, Pennsylvania. Another 2012 article quoted Dhallan as saying, “It's not knowing who the father is that makes a pregnancy challenging and stressful for the mother....Knowing who the father is allows them to make informed decisions about their pregnancies. We've found it can be done very simply and eventually, inexpensively.” He added that “A quarter of women tell me straight up that my answer will impact whether they keep the pregnancy....By the time I did four cases, we had saved one baby. To me, every case is about life and death.”
