= Ravindranath =

Ravindranath, Rathindranath or Rabindranath is an Indian name and may refer to the following:

- Rabindranath Tagore (1861–1941), Bengali poet
- Rabindranath Bhattacharjee, Indian politician
- Rabindranath Maharaj (born 1955), Trinidad-born Canadian author
- Rabindranath Salazar Solorio (born 1968), Mexican politician
- Ravindranath Angre (born 1956), Indian police officer
- Ravindranath Bhargava, Indian politician
- Ravindranath Tewari, Indian politician
- Rabindranath Ghurburrun, Vice President of Mauritius
- S. A. Ravindranath (born 1946), Indian politician
- Vijayalakshmi Ravindranath (born 1953), Indian neuroscientist
- Rathindranath Tagore
- Rathindranath Roy

== See also ==
- Ravindra (disambiguation)
- Nath (disambiguation)
