= Ravinder Kumar (serial killer) =

Indian serial killer (born 1991)

- Born: 1991 (age 34–35); Badaun, Uttar Pradesh
- Years active: 2008–2015
- Known for: Rape and murder of more than 20 children in and around outer Delhi.
- Convictions: Murder, Rape
- Penalty: Life imprisonment

Details
- Victims: 15–30
- Country: India
- States: Delhi, Haryana, Uttar Pradesh
- Target: Children
- Date apprehended: 19 July 2015
- Website: https://rivravinder.com/

Ravinder Kumar (born 1991) is an Indian serial killer, rapist, child molester, and necrophile who committed the abduction, rape, and murder of a minimum of fifteen children between 2008 and 2015. He was apprehended on 19 July 2015 and confessed to murdering thirty children in total. He targeted the children of poor families in Delhi, Mundka, Samaypur Badli, Begampur and Vijay Vihar and confessed to killing more than 30. His victims were primarily aged 4–6 years old. Police were able to link him with 15 of his confessed crimes. His crimes commenced with the rape and murder of a labourer's child from Samaypur Badli in 2008. Some media reports mention accomplices in some of Kumar's crimes.

== Apprehension ==
Kumar shocked investigators with his confession to at least 36 rapes and murders, many described in accurate detail. Police initially doubted his claims until his information helped exonerate a man wrongly accused in one case.

== Trial and sentencing ==
In May 2023, Kumar was sentenced to life imprisonment by a Delhi court on Thursday for the 2015 abduction, rape, and murder of a six-year-old girl. The case had led to the exposure of his broader crimes, committed between 2007 and 2015. Judge Sunil Kumar called the act predatory and said it "shaken the conscience of society," denying any leniency.

Despite his confessions, Kumar was charged in only three cases due to lack of evidence. He had previously been sentenced to 10 years in one case in 2019. In this latest conviction, he was found guilty under multiple sections of the IPC and the Protection of Children from Sexual Offences Act. The court also ordered ₹1,500,000 in compensation to the victim’s family.

== See also ==
- List of serial killers by country
- List of serial killers by number of victims
