= Ravidas =

Indian mystic poet-saint of the Bhakti movement

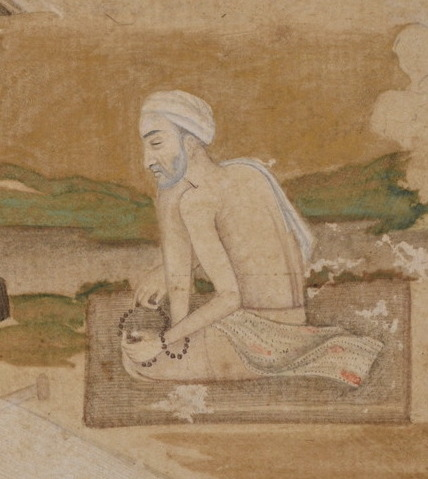
- Ravidas, Mughal style, 1625

Personal life
- Born: Banaras, Delhi Sultanate (present-day Varanasi, Uttar Pradesh, India)
- Died: Banaras, Delhi Sultanate (present-day Varanasi, Uttar Pradesh, India)
- Spouse: Lona Devi
- Children: 1
- Known for: Venerated as a Guru and having hymns included in the Guru Granth Sahib, central figure of the Ravidassia
- Other names: Raidas, Rohidas, Ruhi Dass, Robidas, Bhagat Ravidas, Guru Ravidas
- Occupation: Poet, leather craftsman, satguru (spiritual teacher)

Senior posting
- Influenced by: Ramananda, Advaita Vedanta, Ramanandi Sampradaya, Vaishnavism, Sufism
- Influenced: Meera Bai, Rani Jhala, Raja Pipa, Raja Sikandar Lodhi, Guru Nanak, Raja Bahadur Shah, Rani Ratan Kunwar, Raja Naagar Mall, Pandit Shardha Ram, Raja Chandar Partap, Bibi Bhanmati, Pandit Ganga Ram, Ram Lal, Raja Bain Singh, Rana Sanga, Raja Chandrahans, Kabir, Bhagat Trilochan, Guru Sadhna Sehan

Ravidas or Raidas was an Indian mystic poet-saint of the Bhakti movement during the 15th to 16th century CE. Venerated as a guru (spiritual teacher) in the modern regions of Uttar Pradesh, Bihar, Rajasthan, Gujarat, Maharashtra, Madhya Pradesh, Punjab, and Haryana, he was a poet, social reformer and spiritual figure.

The life details of Ravidas are uncertain and contested. Some scholars believe he was born in 1433 CE. He taught removal of social divisions of caste and gender, and promoted unity in the pursuit of personal spiritual freedom.

Ravidas's devotional verses were included in the Sikh scriptures known as Guru Granth Sahib. The Panch Vani text of the Dadu Panthi tradition within Hinduism also includes numerous poems of Ravidas. He is also the central figure within the Ravidassia religious movement.

Mainstream Sikhs consider him to be a bhagat whilst break-away Ravidassias consider him to be a guru.

== Dates ==
The details of Ravidas's life are not well known. The birth date Ravidas has been a subject of discussion among scholars and devotees, as historical records from the 14th–15th century are limited. Different traditions and sources provide varying years for his birth.Some scholars state he was born in 1377 CE and died in 1528 CE in Banaras at the age of 151 years. Others, such as Amaresh Datta, claim he was born in 1267 and died in 1335.

The Rajput princess and Bhakti saint, Mira Bai (1498–1547 CE), is recorded in multiple traditions as a devoted disciple of Ravidas. This disciple-guru relationship, mentioned in historical and literary sources, indicates that Ravidass must have been alive after 1498 CE and actively guiding his followers when Mirabai reached adulthood, around the time of her marriage in 1516. The connection between Ravidas and Mirabai helps scholars place his lifetime within the late 15th and early 16th centuries.

== Regional variation in names ==
He is remembered by many names across regions, traditions, and languages. These variations reflect affection, honorifics, and local pronunciations. Ravidas is the most common form, especially in Hindi-speaking regions, Ramdas has been used by followers who migrated from West Pakistan., Raidas is widely used in Uttar Pradesh, Madhya Pradesh, and Bihar, Ruhidas/Ruidas is the common pronunciation in Bengal and Eastern India and Rohidas is used in Maharashtra, Karnataka and Gujarat.

The term Ramdasia is merely a corruption of the word Ravidasia. In Punjab, both the words Ramdasia and Ravidasia are also used interchangeably, although these also have regional context. The word Ramdasia is largely used in Puadh and Malwa, while Ravidasia is predominantly used in Doaba.

Followers of Ravidas are known by different names in different regions, depending on history, migration, and local linguistic or social contexts. Ravidassias is the most common and widely accepted name today, especially after the Vienna incident when many followers began identifying as a distinct religious community, Ramdasia is for Sikh Chamar followers, Rohidasi is for those in regions like Maharashtra, Karnataka, Gujarat, and Rajasthan, who revere Ravidas as their spiritual guide, and Ravived is mainly for those in Mauritius.

== Biography ==
Ravidas was born in the village of Sir Gobardhanpur, near Varanasi in what is now Uttar Pradesh, India. His birthplace is now known as Shri Guru Ravidass Janam Asthan. His birthday is celebrated as Ravidas Jayanti and important temple is Ravidas Temple. Mata Kalsi was his mother, and his father was Santokh Dass. His parents belonged to a leather-working Chamar community, an untouchable caste. While his original occupation was leather work, he began to spend most of his time in spiritual pursuits at the banks of the Ganges. Thereafter he spent most of his life in the company of Sufi saints, Sadhus and ascetics. At the age of 12, Ravidas was married off to Lona Devi. They had a son, Vijay Dass.

The text Anantadas Parcai is one of the earliest surviving biographies of various Bhakti movement poets which describes the birth of Ravidas.

Medieval era texts, such as the Bhaktamal suggest that Ravidas was the disciple of the Brahmin bhakti-poet Ramananda. He is traditionally considered as Kabir's younger contemporary.

However, the medieval text Ratnavali says Ravidas gained his spiritual knowledge from Ramananda and was a follower of the Ramanandi Sampradaya tradition.

His ideas and fame grew over his lifetime, and texts suggest Brahmins used to bow before him. He travelled extensively, visiting Hindu pilgrimage sites in Andhra Pradesh, Maharashtra, Gujarat, Rajasthan, and those in the Himalayas. He abandoned saguna (with attributes, image) forms of supreme beings, and focused on the nirguna (without attributes, abstract) form of supreme beings. As his poetic hymns in regional languages inspired others, people from various background sought his teachings and guidance.

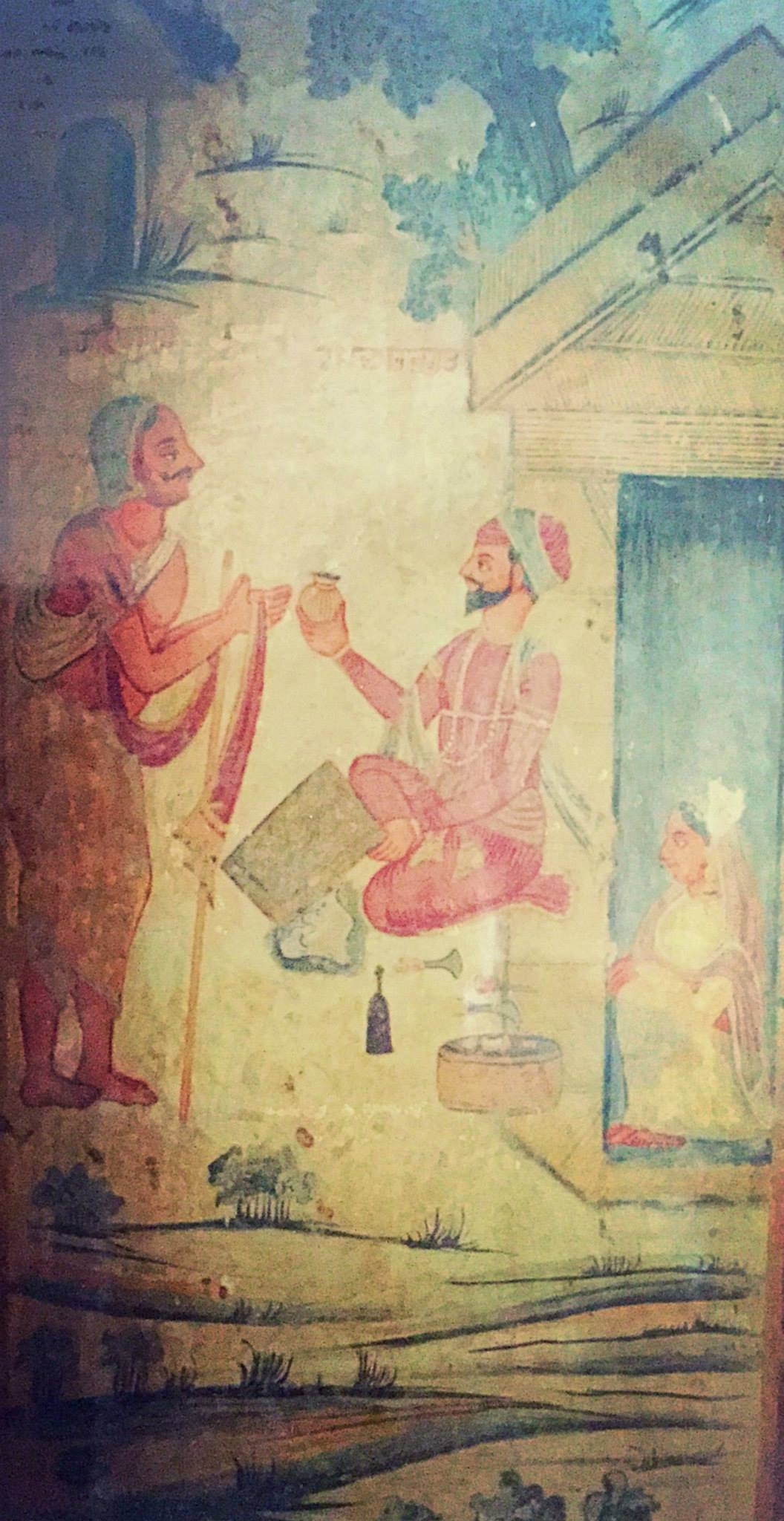
Fresco artwork depicting a lifestory of Ravidas from Pothi-Mala, Guru Har Sahai, Punjab

Most scholars believe that Ravidas met Guru Nanak, the founder of Sikhism. He is revered in the Sikh scripture, and 41 of Ravidas' poems are included in the Guru Granth Sahib. These poems are one of the oldest attested source of his ideas and literary works. Another substantial source of legends and stories about the life of Ravidas is the hagiography in the Sikh tradition, the Premambodha. This text, composed over 170 years after Ravidas' death, in 1693, includes him as one of the seventeen saints of Indian religious tradition. The 17th-century Nabhadas's Bhaktamal, and the Parcais of Anantadas, both contain chapters on Ravidas. Other than these, the scriptures and texts of Sikh tradition and the Hindu Dadupanthi traditions, most other written sources about the life of Ravidas, including by the Ravidasi (followers of Ravidas), were composed in the early 20th century, or about 400 years after his death.

Text, called the Parcaīs (or Parchais), included Ravidas among the sants whose biography and poems were included. Over time new manuscripts of Parcais of Anantadas were reproduced, some in different local languages of India. Winnand Callewaert notes that some 30 manuscripts of Anantadas's hagiography on Ravidas have been found in different parts of India. Of these four manuscripts are complete, collated and have been dated to 1662, 1665, 1676 and 1687. The first three are close with some morphological variants without affecting the meaning, but the 1687 version systematically inserts verses into the text, at various locations, with caste-related statements, new claims of Brahmins persecuting Ravidas, notes on the untouchability of Ravidas, claims of Kabir giving Ravidas ideas, ridicules of nirguni and saguni ideas, and such text corruption: Callewaert considers the 1676 version as the standard version, his critical edition of Ravidas's hagiography excludes all these insertions, and he remarks that the cleaner critical version of Anantadas's parcais suggests that there is more in common in the ideas of bhakti movement's Ravidas, Kabir and Sen than previously thought.

Khare similarly has questioned the textual sources on Ravidas, and mentions there are few "readily available and reliable textual sources on the Hindu and Untouchable treatment of Ravidas."

== Literary works ==
The Adi Granth and the Panchvani of the Hindu warrior-ascetic group Dadupanthi are the two oldest attested sources of the literary works of Ravidas. In the Adi Granth, forty one of Ravidas's poems are included, and he is one of thirty six contributors to this foremost canonical scripture of Sikhism. This compilation of poetry in Adi Granth responds to, among other things, issues of dealing with conflict and tyranny, war and resolution, and willingness to dedicate one's life to the right cause. Ravidas's poetry covers topics such as the definition of a just state where there are no second or third class unequal citizens, the need for dispassion, and who is a real Yogi.

Jeffrey Ebbesen notes that, just like other Bhakti saint-poets of India and some cases of Western literature authorship, many poems composed by later era Indian poets have been attributed to Ravidas, as an act of reverence, even though Ravidas has had nothing to do with these poems or ideas expressed therein.

=== Ravidas literature on symbolism ===
Peter Friedlander states that Ravidas' hagiographies, though authored long after he died, depict a struggle within the Indian society, where Ravidas' life gives the means to express a variety of social and spiritual themes. At one level, it depicts a struggle between the then prevalent heterodox communities and the orthodox Brahminical tradition. At another level, the legends are an inter-communal, inter-religious struggle with an underlying search and desire for social unity. At yet another level, states Friedlander, the stories describe the spiritual struggle of an individual unto self.

There is no historical evidence to verify the historicity in these hagiographies, which range from Ravidas's struggle with Hindu Brahmins, to his struggle with Muslim Sultan Sikander Lodi. Friedlander states that the stories reflect the social dynamics that influenced the composers of the hagiographies during the 17th- to 20th-century. These are legends where Ravidas is victorious because of divine intervention with miracles such as making a stone float in water, or making river Ganges to reverse course and flow upstream.

David Lorenzen similarly states that poetry attributed to Ravidas, and championed by Ravidasi from the 17th through the 20th century, have a strong anti-Brahminical and anti-communal theme. The legends, suggests Lorenzen, cannot be separated from the power and political situation of this era, and they reflect a strong element of social and religious dissent by groups marginalised during a period when Indian society was under the Islamic rule and later the colonial rule.

== Philosophy ==
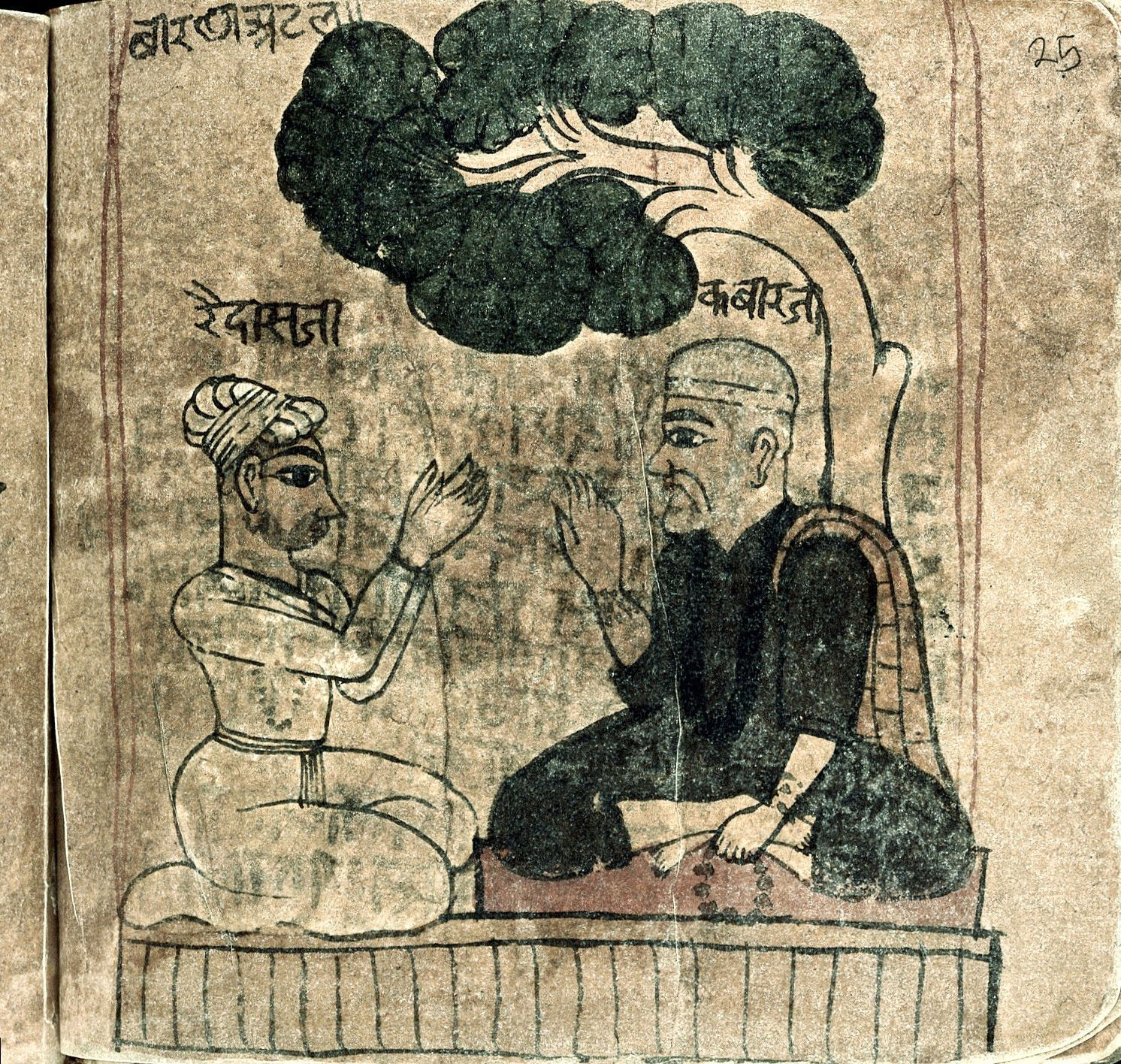
Manuscript folio painting of Ravidas (left) and Kabir (right) seated under a tree

The songs of Ravidas discuss Nirguna-Saguna themes, as well as ideas that are at the foundation of Nath Yoga philosophy of Hinduism. He frequently mentions the term Sahaj, a mystical state where there is a union of the truths of the many and the one.

Raidas says, what shall I sing?
Singing, singing I am defeated.
How long shall I consider and proclaim:
absorb the self into the Self?

This experience is such,
that it defies all description.
I have met the Lord,
Who can cause me harm?

Hari in everything, everything in Hari –
For him who knows Hari and the sense of self,
no other testimony is needed:
the knower is absorbed.

— Ravidas, Translated by Winand Callewaert and Peter Friedlander

David Lorenzen states Ravidas's poetry is imbued with themes of boundless loving devotion to God, wherein this divine is envisioned as Nirguna. In the Sikh tradition, the themes of Nanak's poetry are very broadly similar to the Nirgun bhakti ideas of Ravidas and other leading north Indian saint-poets. Most postmodern scholars, states Karen Pechilis, consider Ravidas's ideas to belong to the Nirguna philosophy within the Bhakti movement.

=== Monistic Brahman or Anthropomorphic God ===
Multiple manuscripts found in Rajasthan and Uttar Pradesh, dated to be from the 18th and 19th centuries, contain a debate between Kabir and Ravidas on the nature of the Absolute, more specifically whether the Brahman (Ultimate Reality, Eternal Truth) is monistic Oneness or a separate anthropomorphic incarnate. Kabir argues for the former. Ravidas, in contrast, argues from the latter premise to the effect that both are one. In these manuscripts, Kabir initially prevails, Ravidas accepts that Brahman is monistic, but till the end Kabir didn't accept worshipping a divine avatar (sagun conception).

=== One man: two divergent claims on his views and philosophy ===
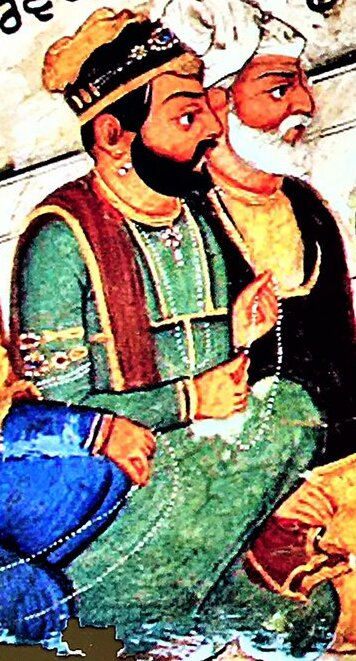
Detail of Ravidas (wearing green) from a mural at Gurdwara Baba Atal in Amritsar, circa 19th century

Ravindra Khare states that there are two divergent versions that emerge from the study of texts relating to Ravidas's philosophy. The 17th century Bhaktamal text by Nabhadas provides one version, while the 20th-century texts by Dalits provide another.

According to Bhaktamal text, Ravidas was of pure speech, capable of resolving spiritual doubts of those who held discussions with him, was unafraid to state his humble origins and real caste. Further, the Bhaktamal text states that Ravidas' teachings agreed with Vedic and ancient scriptures, he subscribed to nondualism, discussed spiritual ideas and philosophy with everyone including Brahmins without gender or caste discrimination, and his abilities reflected an individual who had reached the inner content state of the highest ascetic.

The 20th-century version, prevalent in the texts of Dalit community, concurs with the parts about pure speech and resolving spiritual doubts. However, they differ in the rest. The texts and the prevalent beliefs of the Dalit community hold that Ravidas rejected the Hindu Vedas, he was opposed by the Brahmins and resisted by the caste Hindus as well as Hindu ascetics throughout his life, and that some members of the Dalit community have believed Ravidas was an idol worshipper (saguni bhakti saint), while other 20th-century texts assert that Ravidas rejected idolatry. For example, the following hymn of Ravidas, present in Guru Granth Sahib, support such claims where he rejects Vedas and the belief that taking a ritualistic bath can make someone pure.

One may distinguish between good and evil actions, and listen to the Vedas and the Puranas, but doubt still persists. Skepticism continually dwells in the heart, so who can eradicate egotistical pride? Outwardly, he washes with water, but deep within, his heart is tarnished by all sorts of vices. So how can he become pure? His method of purification is like that of an elephant, covering himself with dust right after his bath!

— Ravidas, Guru Granth Sahib 346

His spiritual teacher Ramananda was a Brahmin and his disciple Mirabai was a Rajput princess.

== Legacy ==
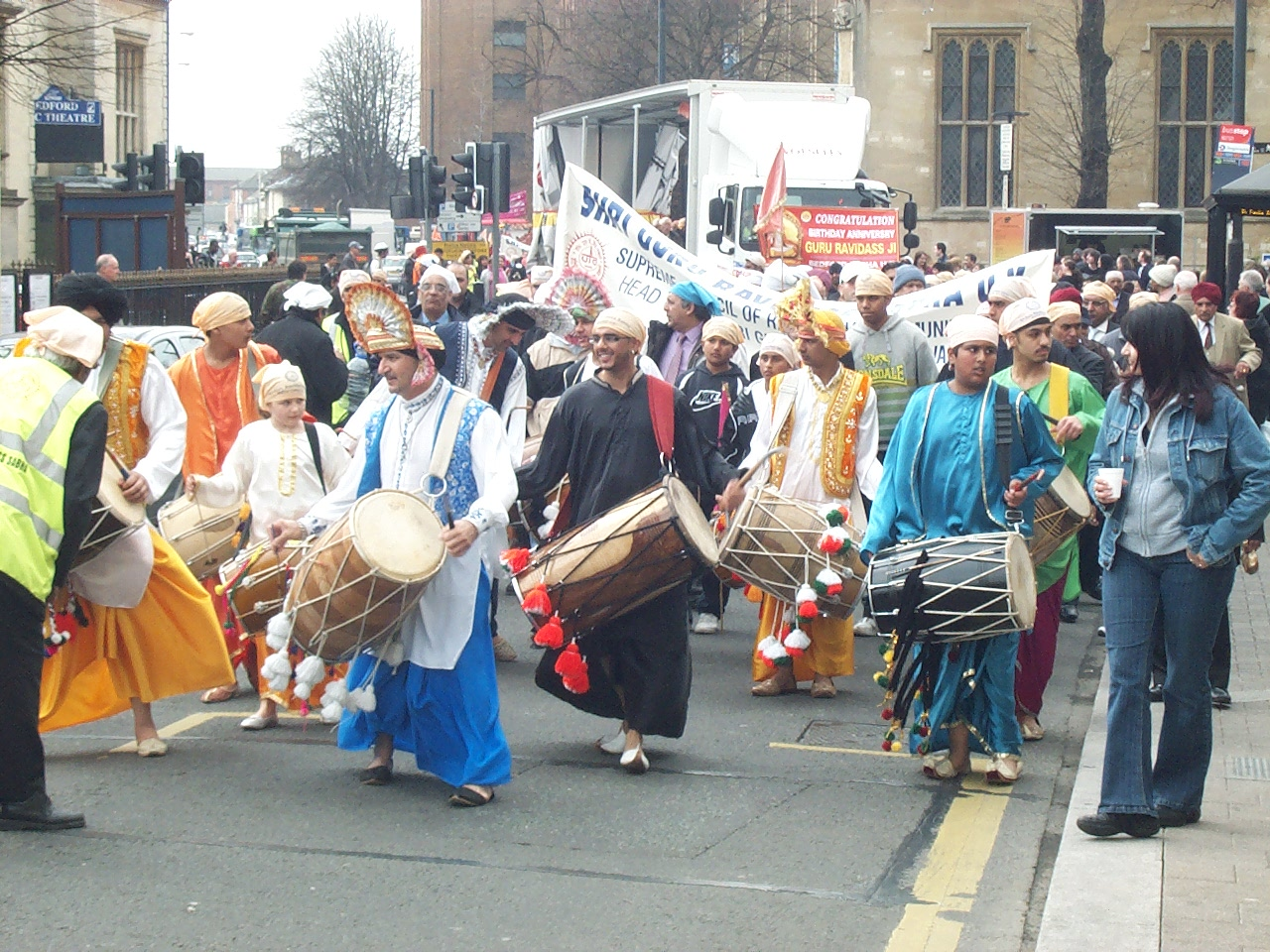
A procession in Bedford, the United Kingdom by Ravidasias to mark the birthday of Ravidas.

=== Ravidassia ===
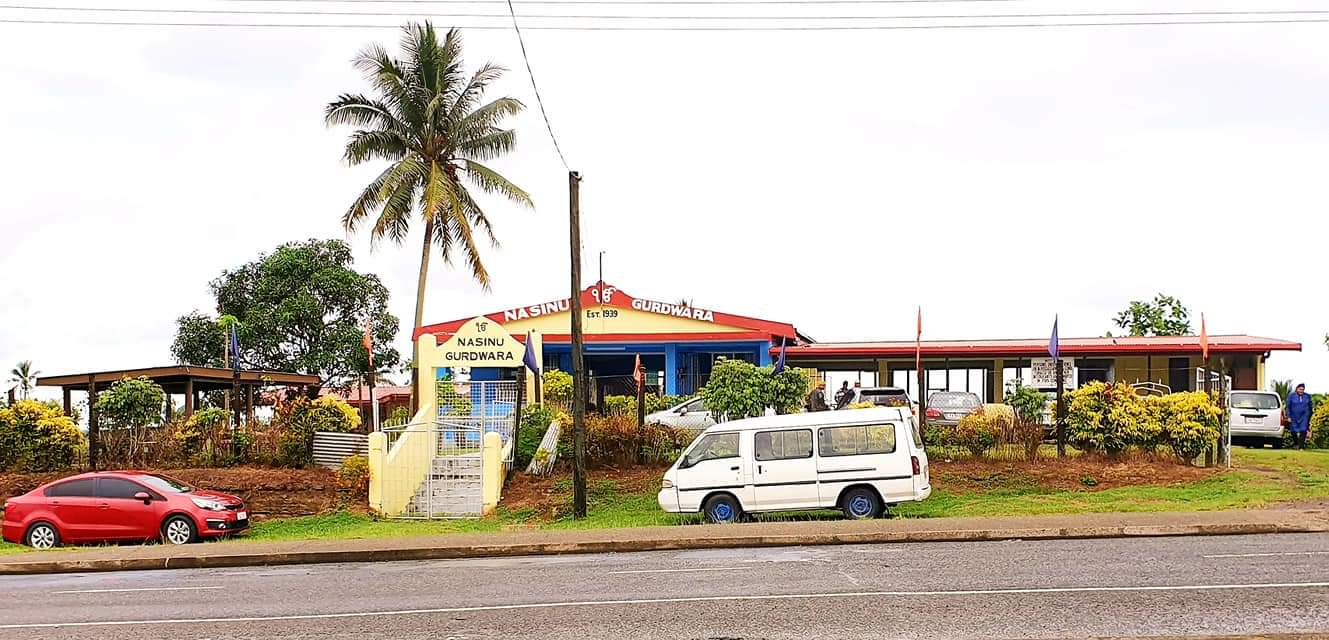
Gurdwara Guru Ravidass, Nasinu, Fiji Established in 1939

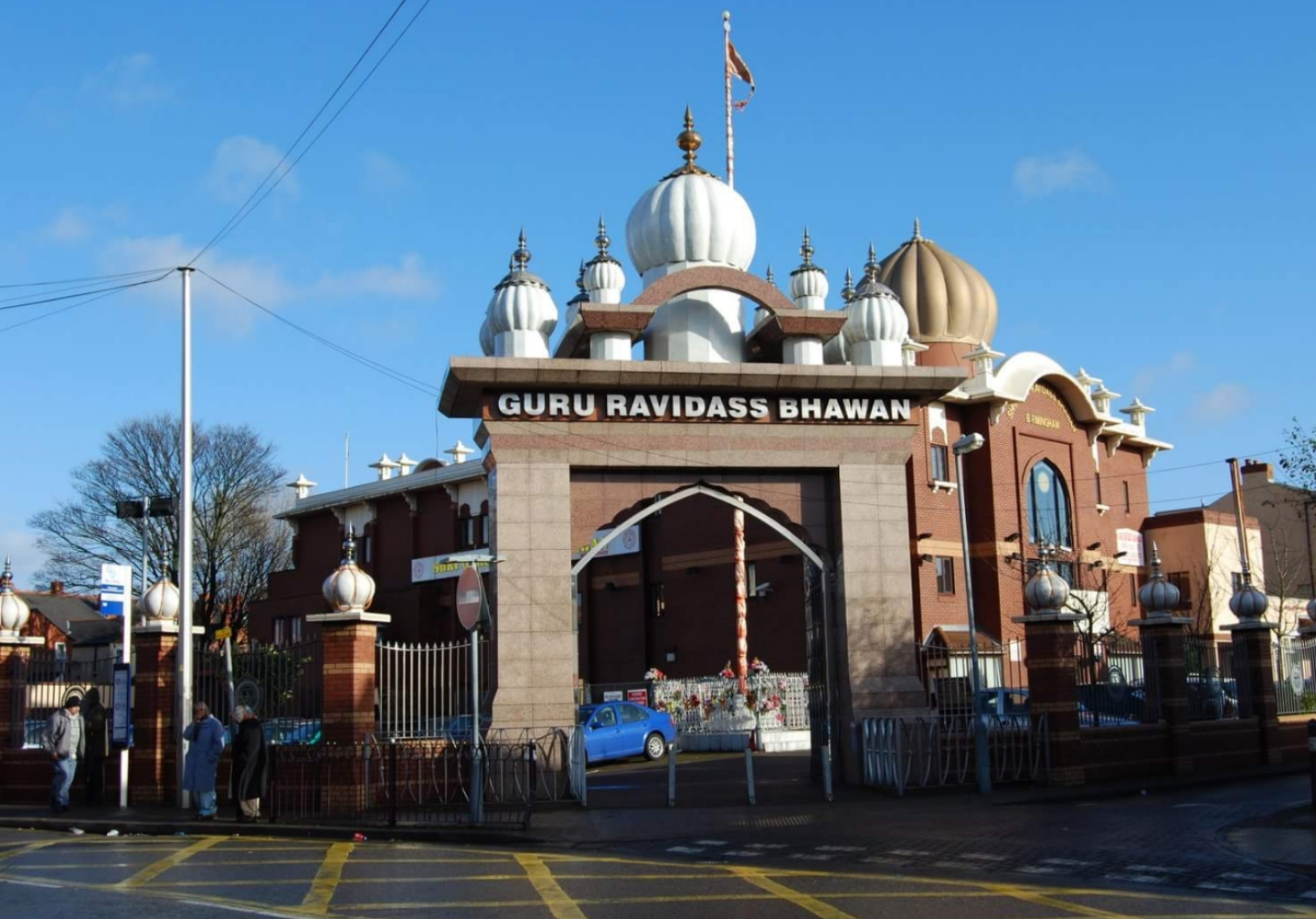
Gurdwara Guru Ravidass Bhavan, Birmingham

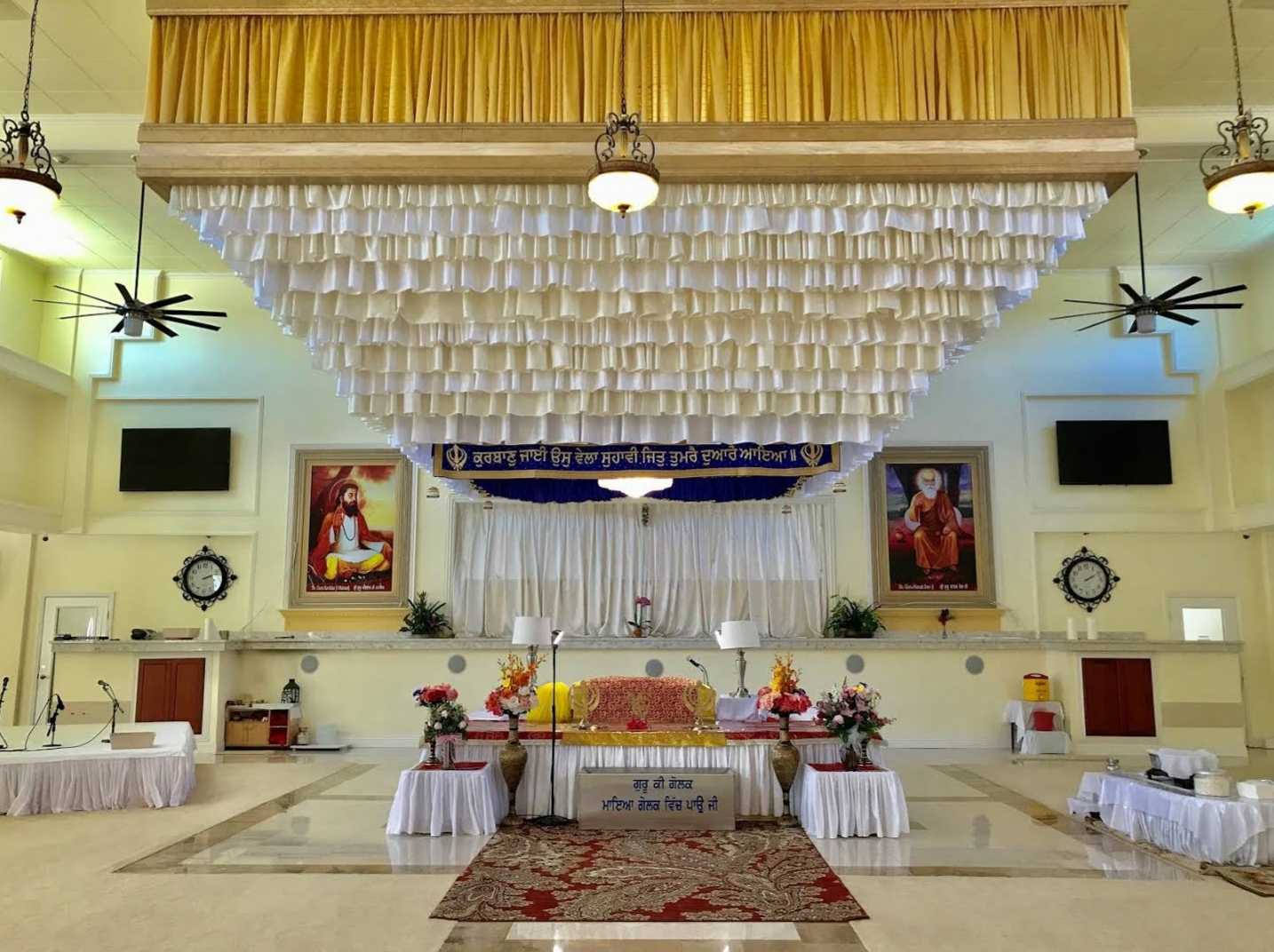
Gurdwara Guru Ravidass Temple, Pittsburg, California

The difference between the Ravidassia and Sikhism, as described by a post made by Shri Guru Ravidass Temple in Ontario is as follows:

We, as Ravidassias have different traditions. We are not Sikhs. Even though, we give utmost respect to 10 gurus and Guru Granth Sahib, Guru Ravidass Ji is our supreme. There is no command for us to follow the declaration that there is no Guru after Guru Granth Sahib. We respect Guru Granth Sahib because it has our guru Ji's teachings and teachings of other religious figures who have spoken against caste system, spread the message of NAAM and equality. As per our traditions, we give utmost respect to contemporary gurus also who are carrying forward the message of Guru Ravidass Ji.

The Ravidassia religion is a spin-off religion from Sikhism, formed in the 21st century, by the followers of Ravidas's teachings. It was formed following a 2009 attack on a Ravidassia temple in Vienna by Sikh militants leading to the death of deputy head Ramanand Dass and 16 others injured, where after the movement declared itself to be a religion fully separated from Sikhism. The Ravidassia religion compiled a new holy book, Amritbani Guru Ravidass Ji. Based entirely on the writings and teaching of Ravidas, it contains 240 hymns. Niranjan Dass is the head of Dera Sachkhand Ballan.

Kathryn Lum summarises the dynamics behind the separation of Ravidassia and Sikhism, and its focus on Ravidas, as follows:

Ravidasia believe that the best way forward for Chamars is to claim and assert their own identity. For this more independent camp, Sikhism is viewed as obstructing the full development of the Chamar community as a quam (separate religion and nation), as envisioned by the Ad Dharm (original people) movement. According to these separatist Ravidasias, the only way for Chamars to progress is to pursue an independent religious path focused exclusively on the figure of Guru Ravidas.

— Kathryn Lum, Sikhs in Europe

=== Places of worship ===
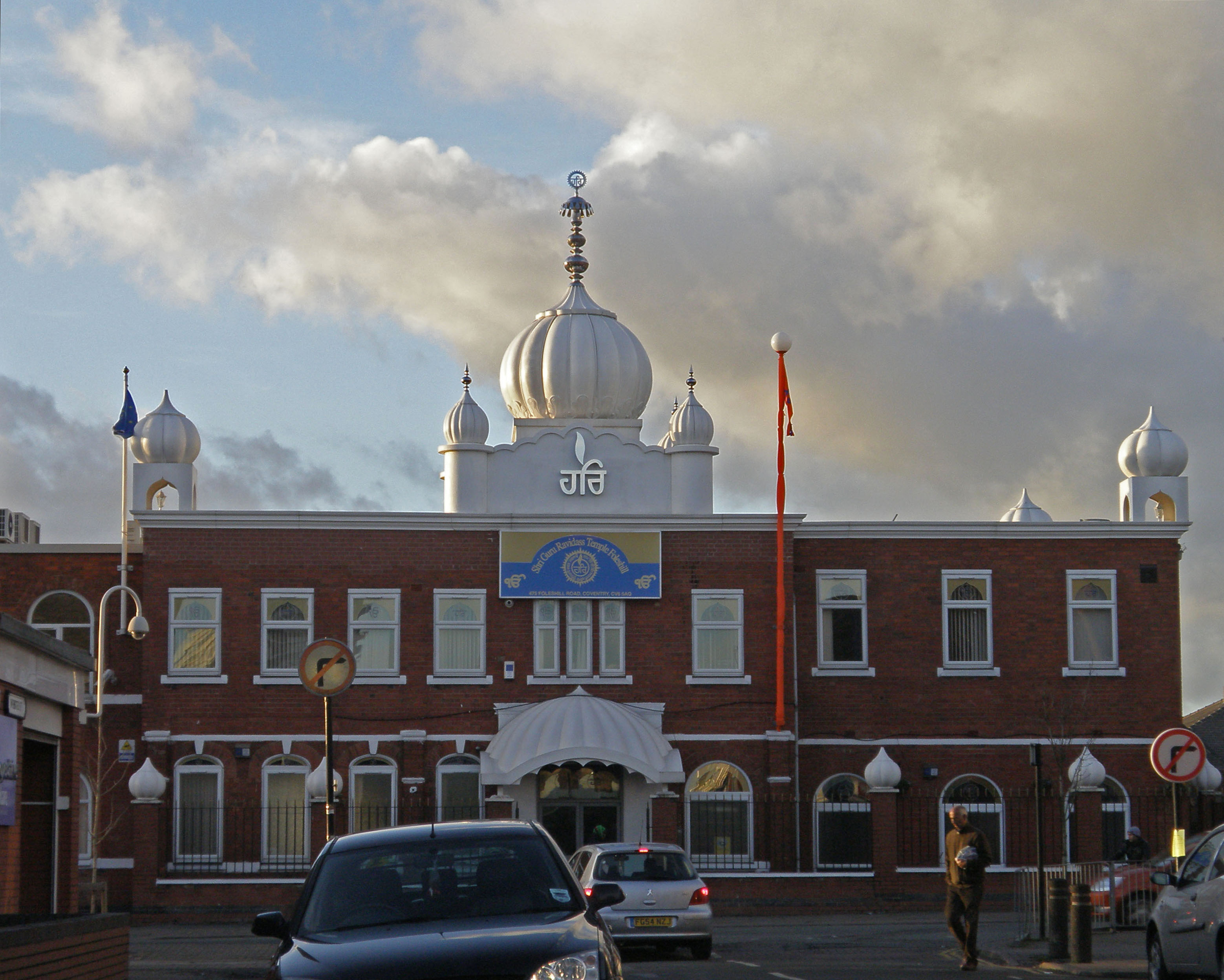
Guru Ravidass temple, Foleshill, UK.

Ravidas is revered as a saint and well respected by his believers. He is considered by his devotees as someone who was the living symbol of religious protest, and not as the spiritual symbol of any ultimate unifying cultural principle. The most revered religious shrine of Ravidas is the Shri Guru Ravidass Janam Asthan Mandir in Seer Goverdhanpur, Varanasi (Uttar Pradesh, India), which is believed to be the birthplace of the saint. The temple, built in the early 20th century with contributions from the Ravidassia community across India and abroad, has grown into the spiritual center of Ravidas’s followers. It houses his memorial, prayer hall, and a museum dedicated to his teachings. Each year, especially on Guru Ravidass Jayanti (his birth anniversary, celebrated on Magh Purnima), hundreds of thousands of devotees from India and the diaspora gather there for prayers, kirtans, and community celebrations. The shrine symbolises his message of equality, unity, and devotion to God, cutting across caste and social barriers. Apart from Varanasi, other important shrines include gurdwaras and temples dedicated to him in Punjab (such as in Ballan near Jalandhar, the Dera Sachkhand Ballan).

Beyond India, Ravidassias have built significant temples in the United Kingdom, the United States, Canada, Australia, New Zealand, and parts of Europe, including Austria, France, Germany, Greece, the Netherlands, and Italy. These shrines function not only as places of worship but also as cultural and social hubs, hosting religious ceremonies, festivals, educational programs, and community services. They symbolise the global spread of Ravidas’s message of equality, devotion, and social justice, while helping the Ravidassia diaspora maintain their spiritual and cultural identity.

=== Politics ===
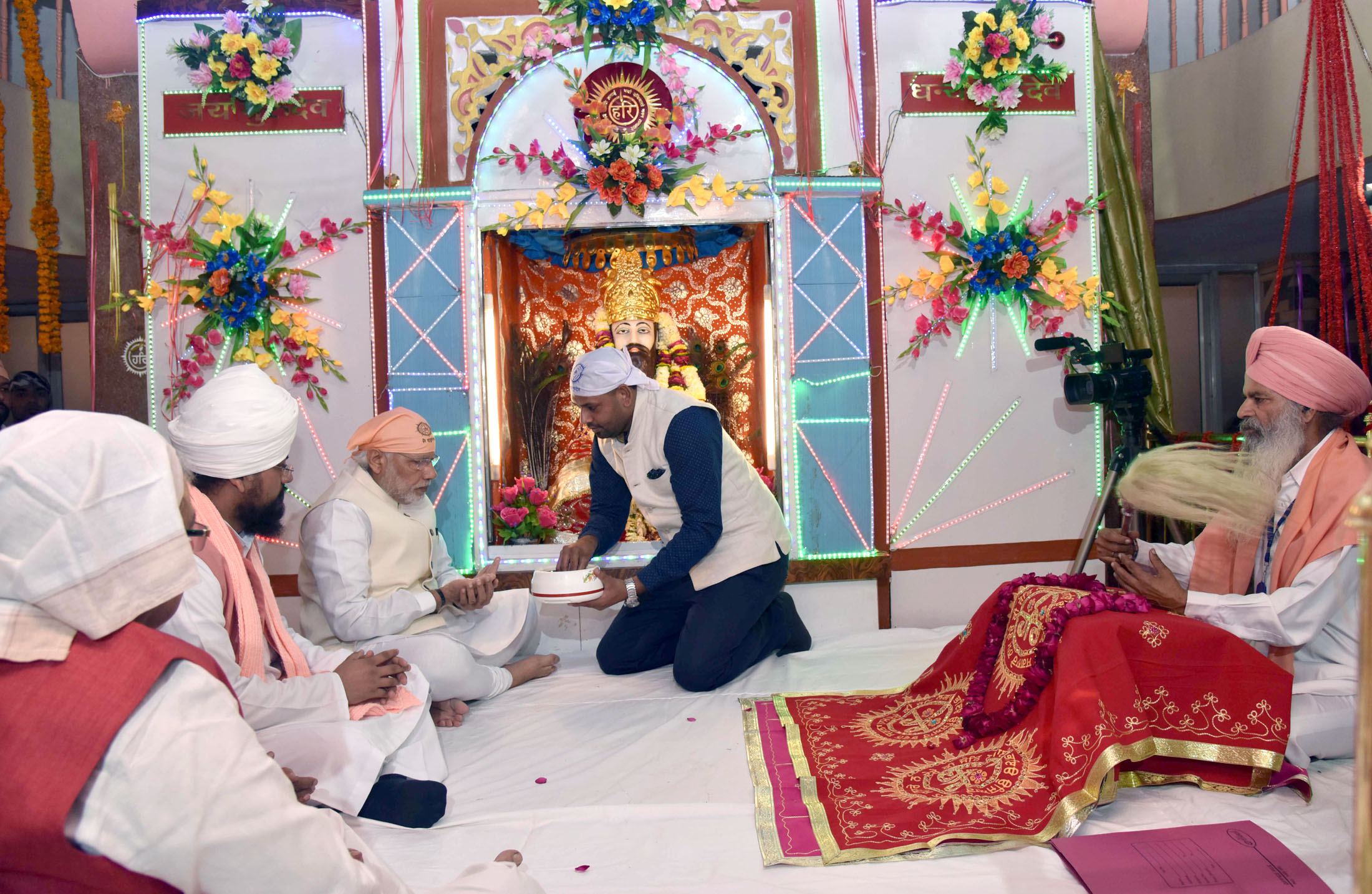
Prime Minister Narendra Modi offers prayers at Shri Guru Ravidas Janmsthan Mandir

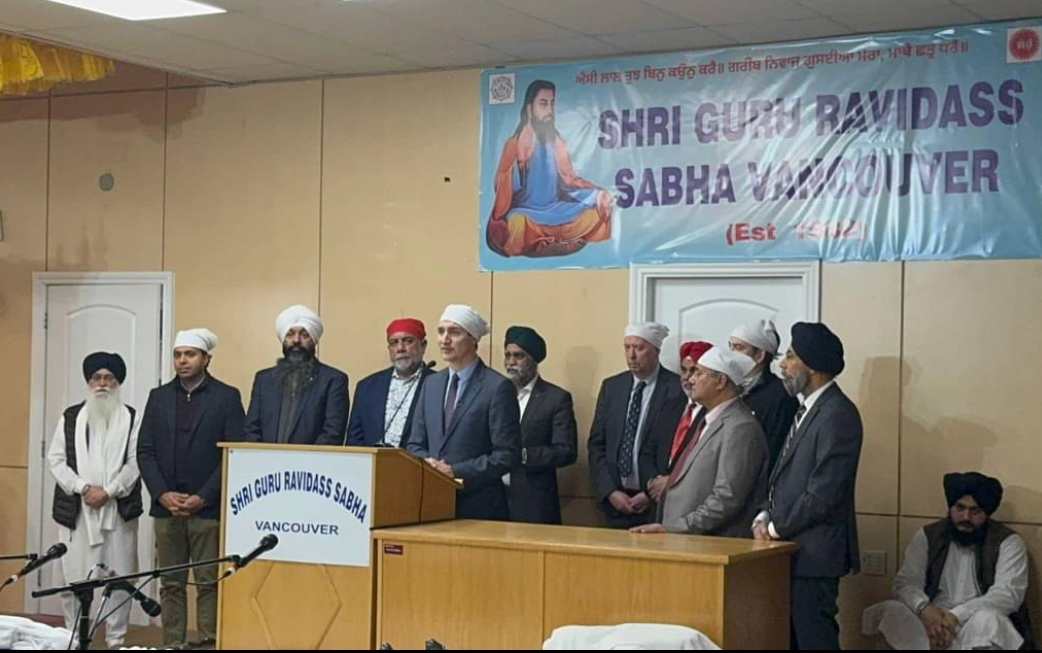
Canadian Prime Minister Justin Trudeau at Guru Ravidass Temple, Vancouver

A political party was founded in India in 2012 by the followers of Ravidass, with the word Begumpura (Be-gam-pura, or "land without sorrow"), a term coined in a poem by Ravidas. The term means the city where there is no suffering or fear, and all are equal.

The significance of the Guru Ravidass's Jayanti can be identified from the move of the Election Commission of India when they postponed the Punjab general assembly election, which was an unprecedented and rare move in the history of India.

When then-CM Mayawati attempted to create a beautiful park at the birthplace of Ravidas in Seer Gowardhanpur in 1997, the temple's political significance grew. The BSP leader gave a golden palanquin to the shrine and participated in Ravidas Jayanti festivities while serving as chief minister in 2008.Later, as part of their Dalit outreach efforts, representatives from all parties began to visit the Ravidas temple.In 2016 and 2019, PM Narendra Modi also participated in the Ravidas Jayanti festivities.Following his attendance at the Ravidas Jayanti festivities in 2018, Chief Minister Yogi Adityanath made numerous visits to the temple to observe its progress.On 6 May 2019, Mayawati and SP chief Akhilesh Yadav hosted a rally for their SP-BSP grand alliance in preparation for parliamentary elections at the temple's satsang field.

During the 2022 Punjab Assembly elections, Ravidas's birthplace, Varanasi, became the political capital of India. Leaders from different political parties, such as Rahul Gandhi, Priyanka Gandhi, Yogi Adityanath, Akhilesh Yadav, Charanjit Singh Channi, and many more, paid obeisance to Ravidass at his temple. The prime minister also visited Guru Ravidas Dham Temple, Karol Bagh, amid the political campaign to woo voters from the Ravidassia community.

Prior to the parliamentary elections in Canada, former Prime Minister Justin Trudeau also paid a visit to the Guru Ravidass Temples in Vancouver and Montreal, where he expressed gratitude for the sacrifices made by the congregation and society members. During his visit, Mr. Trudeau discussed the principles of "equality" that Ravidass advocated, stating that Canada shares these principles.

=== Ravidas and Meera Bai ===
According to hagiographies and oral traditions, Mira Bai, the Rajput princess of Mewar and saint-poetess devoted to Krishna, is often described as a disciple of Ravidas (Raidas). She met Ravidas during her early spiritual quest. She considered him her guru (spiritual teacher) and is believed to have received spiritual initiation (diksha) from him.

There is a small chhatri (pavilion) in front of Meera's temple in Chittorgarh district of Rajasthan which bears Ravidas' engraved foot print. Legends link him as the guru of Mirabai, another major Bhakti movement poet.

Queen Mira Bai composed a song dedicated to Ravidas where she mentioned him as her guru.

Sadguru sant mile Ravidas
Mira devaki kare vandana aas
Jin chetan kahya dhann Bhagavan Ravidas

– "I got a guru in the form of sant Ravidas, there by obtaining life's fulfillment."

== Gallery ==
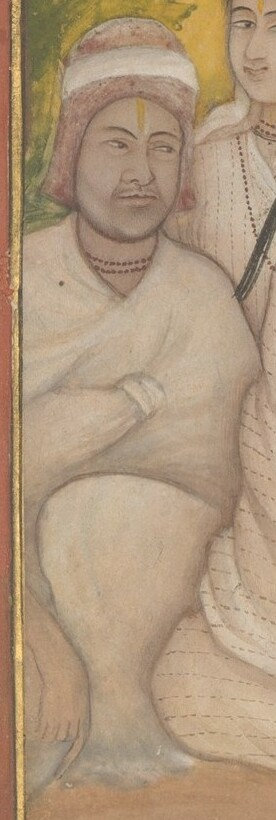
Detail of Ravidas from a painting of a gathering of holy men of different faiths, by Mir Kalan Khan, ca.1770–75

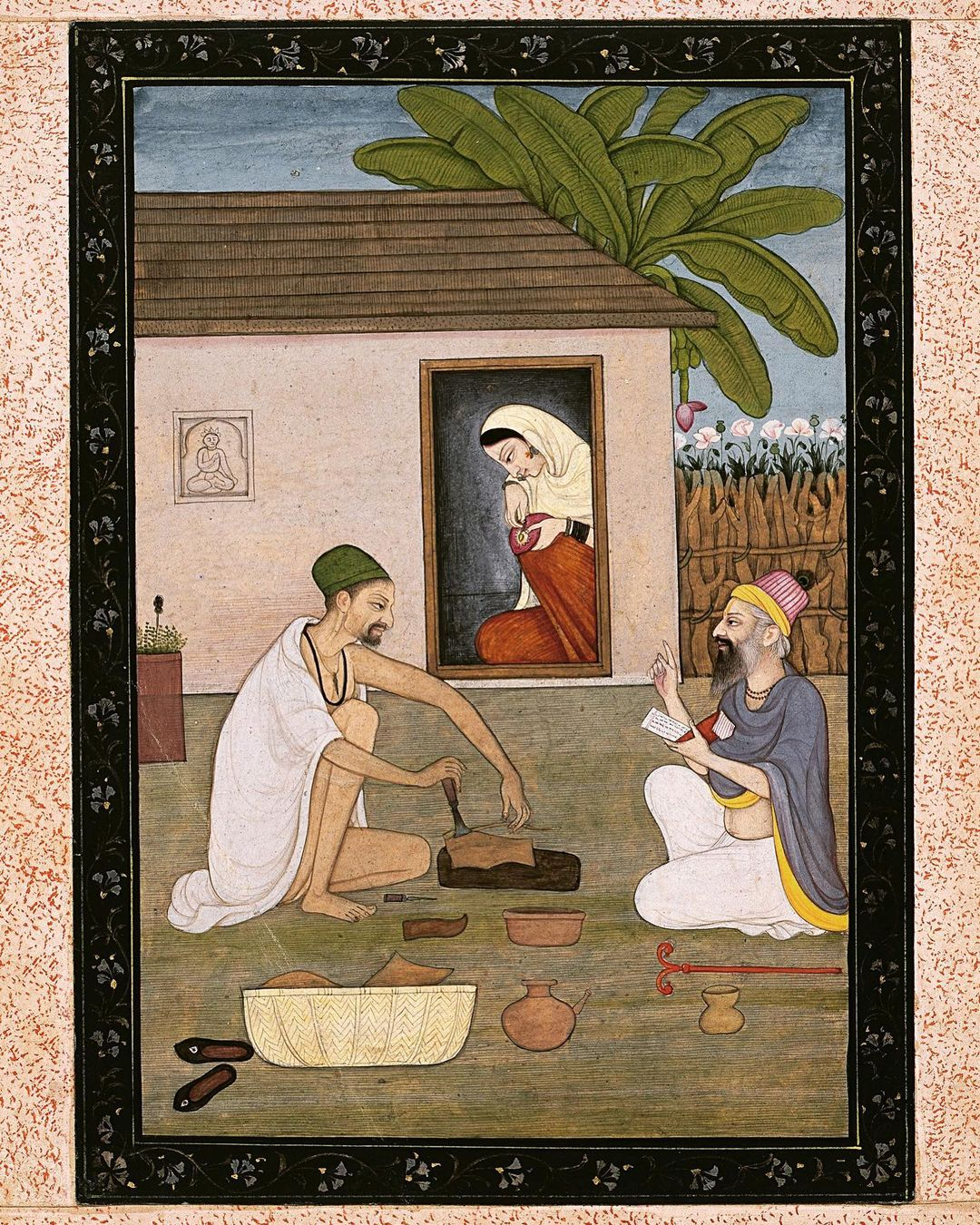
Ravidas at work as a shoemaker. Folio from a series featuring Bhakti saints. Master of the first generation after Manaku and Nainsukh of Guler, Pahari region, c. 1800–1810

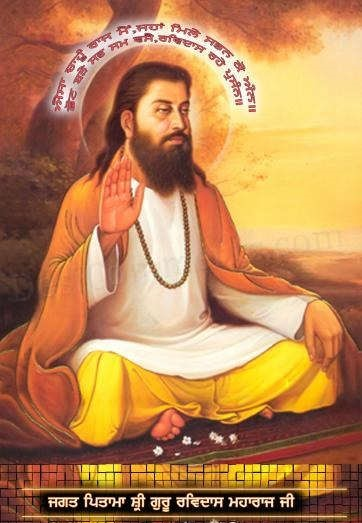
Modern painting of Ravidas

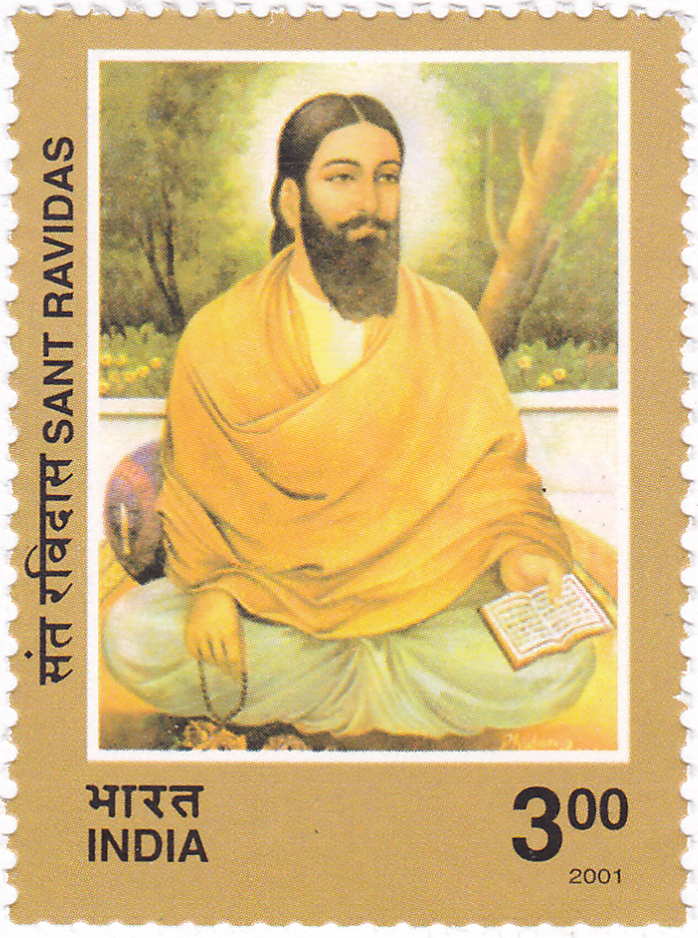
Ravidas on 2001 Indian commemorative stamp.

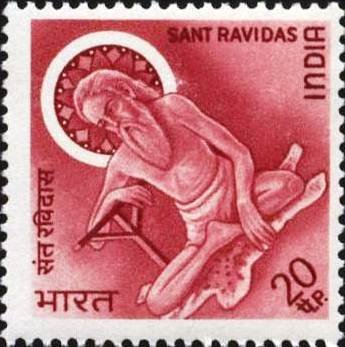
Ravidas on 1971 Indian commemorative stamp.

== Art and films ==
• Sant Ravidas Ki Amar Kahani

== See also ==
- Dalit Buddhist movement
