= Rabindrah Ghurburrun =

First Vice President of Mauritius

Sir Rabindranath Ghurburrun GOSK
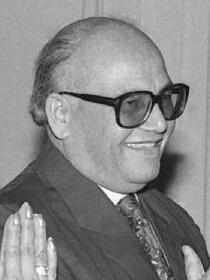

1st Vice President of Mauritius
- In office 1 July 1992 – 30 June 1997
- President: Cassam Uteem
- Preceded by: Office established
- Succeeded by: Angidi Chettiar

Sir Rabindrah Ghurburrun, GOSK (1928–2008) was the first vice president of Mauritius from 1992 to 1997. He started his political career as a member of the Mauritius Labour Party. However, he was appointed by the Mauritian Militant Movement-Militant Socialist Movement coalition government as vice president while the Labour Party was in the opposition.

Born into a Hindu Ravived (synonymous of caste Chamar) family, a lawyer by profession, he did a diploma at the University of Oxford. He was also the first High Commissioner of Mauritius to India. Then Prime Minister Indira Gandhi described him as behaving like the last Maharaja of India.

He died at the age of 79 in Paris, France.

Political offices
Preceded by Office established	Vice President of Mauritius; 1992–1997	Succeeded by Angidi Chettiar
