= List of diplomatic missions of India =

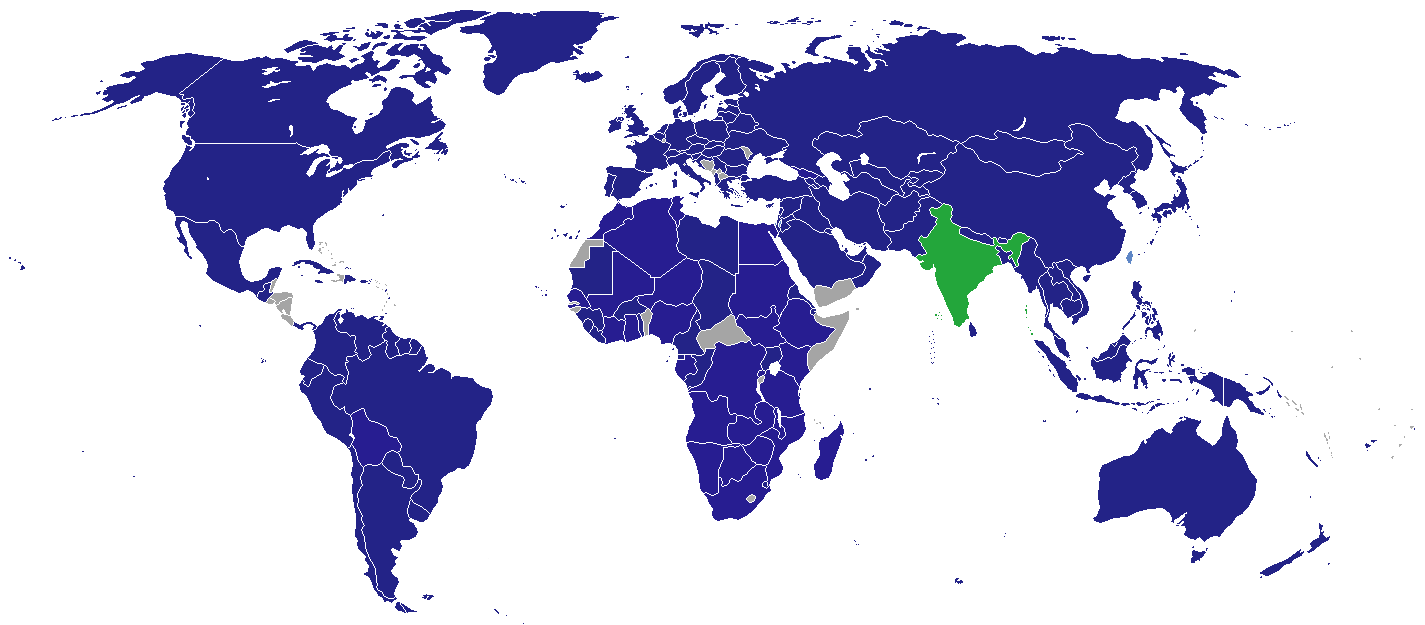
Diplomatic missions of India Countries that host an Indian embassy or high commission Countries that do not host Indian missions Republic of India

The Republic of India has one of the largest diplomatic networks, reflecting its links in the world and particularly in neighbouring regions: Central Asia, the Middle East, East Africa, Europe, Southeast Asia, and the rest of the Indian subcontinent. There are also far-flung missions in the Caribbean and the Pacific, locations of historical Indian diaspora communities.

As a member of the Commonwealth of Nations, Indian diplomatic missions in the capitals of other Commonwealth members are known as High Commissions. In other cities of Commonwealth countries, the consular missions are known as "Consulates-General", except those in Bangladesh, which are known as "Assistant High Commission(s)".

== Current missions ==
As of 2026, India has 223 resident missions operating in various countries worldwide, not including honorary missions.

Region / Category	Number of Missions Operational
Africa	52
Europe (including Russia)	51
North America (US and Canada)	12
Latin America and the Caribbean	21
South Asia	16
West Asia	24
Central Asia	5
East Asia	11
South-East Asia	17
Oceania	9
Multilateral Organizations	5
Total	223

=== Africa ===
Host country	Host city	Mission	Concurrent accreditation	Ref.
Algeria	Algiers	Embassy		
Angola	Luanda	Embassy		
Botswana	Gaborone	High Commission	International Organizations: Southern African Development Community (Note: Accredited as an observer mission.)	
Burkina Faso	Ouagadougou	Embassy		
Cameroon	Yaoundé	High Commission		
Cape Verde	Praia	Embassy		
Chad	N'Djamena	Embassy		
Congo-Brazzaville	Brazzaville	Embassy		
Congo-Kinshasa	Kinshasa	Embassy	Countries: Central African Republic	
Djibouti	Djibouti City	Embassy		
Egypt	Cairo	Embassy		
Equatorial Guinea	Malabo	Embassy		
Eritrea	Asmara	Embassy		
Eswatini	Mbabane	High Commission		
Ethiopia	Addis Ababa	Embassy	International Organizations: African Union	
Gabon	Libreville	High Commission		
Ghana	Accra	High Commission		
Guinea	Conakry	Embassy		
Ivory Coast	Abidjan	Embassy		
Kenya	Nairobi	High Commission	Countries: Somalia; International Organizations: United Nations; United Nations Environment Programme; United Nations Human Settlements Programme	
Kenya	Mombasa	Assistant High Commission	Countries: Somalia; International Organizations: United Nations; United Nations Environment Programme; United Nations Human Settlements Programme	
Liberia	Monrovia	Embassy		
Libya	Tripoli	Embassy		
Madagascar	Antananarivo	Embassy	Countries: Comoros	
Malawi	Lilongwe	High Commission		
Mali	Bamako	Embassy		
Mauritania	Nouakchott	Embassy		
Mauritius	Port Louis	High Commission		
Morocco	Rabat	Embassy		
Mozambique	Maputo	High Commission		
Namibia	Windhoek	High Commission		
Niger	Niamey	Embassy		
Nigeria	Abuja	High Commission	Countries: Benin; International Organizations: Economic Community of West African States	
Nigeria	Lagos	Consulate-General	Countries: Benin; International Organizations: Economic Community of West African States	
Rwanda	Kigali	High Commission		
São Tomé and Príncipe	São Tomé	Embassy		
Senegal	Dakar	Embassy	Countries: Gambia; Guinea-Bissau	
Seychelles	Victoria	High Commission		
Sierra Leone	Freetown	High Commission		
South Africa	Pretoria	High Commission	Countries: Lesotho	
South Africa	Cape Town	Consulate-General	Countries: Lesotho	
South Africa	Durban	Consulate-General	Countries: Lesotho	
South Africa	Johannesburg	Consulate-General	Countries: Lesotho	
South Sudan	Juba	Embassy		
Sudan	Port Sudan (Note: Originally in Khartoum, was relocated to Port Sudan as a result of the ongoing civil war.)	Embassy		
Tanzania	Dar es Salaam	High Commission		
Tanzania	Zanzibar City	Consulate-General		
Togo	Lomé	Embassy		
Tunisia	Tunis	Embassy		
Uganda	Kampala	High Commission	Countries: Burundi	
Zambia	Lusaka	High Commission		
Zimbabwe	Harare	Embassy		

=== Americas ===
Host country	Host city	Mission	Concurrent accreditation	Ref.
Argentina	Buenos Aires	Embassy		
Bolivia	La Paz	Embassy		
Brazil	Brasília	Embassy		
Brazil	São Paulo	Consulate-General		
Canada	Ottawa	High Commission		
Canada	Toronto	Consulate-General		
Canada	Vancouver	Consulate-General		
Chile	Santiago de Chile	Embassy		
Colombia	Bogotá	Embassy		
Costa Rica	San José	Embassy		
Cuba	Havana	Embassy		
Dominican Republic	Santo Domingo	Embassy	Countries: Haiti	
Ecuador	Quito	Embassy		
Guatemala	Guatemala City	Embassy	Countries: El Salvador; Honduras	
Guyana	Georgetown	High Commission	Countries: Antigua and Barbuda; Saint Kitts and Nevis; International Organizations: Caribbean Community	
Jamaica	Kingston	High Commission	Countries: Bahamas	
Mexico	Mexico City	Embassy	Countries: Belize	
Panama	Panama City	Embassy	Countries: Nicaragua	
Paraguay	Asunción	Embassy		
Peru	Lima	Embassy		
Suriname	Paramaribo	Embassy	Countries: Barbados; Saint Lucia; Saint Vincent and the Grenadines	
Trinidad and Tobago	Port of Spain	High Commission	Countries: Dominica; Grenada	
United States	Washington, D.C.	Embassy	International Organizations: Organization of American States	
United States	Atlanta	Consulate-General	International Organizations: Organization of American States	
United States	Boston	Consulate-General	International Organizations: Organization of American States	
United States	Chicago	Consulate-General	International Organizations: Organization of American States	
United States	Houston	Consulate-General	International Organizations: Organization of American States	
United States	Los Angeles	Consulate-General	International Organizations: Organization of American States	
United States	New York City	Consulate-General	International Organizations: Organization of American States	
United States	San Francisco	Consulate-General	International Organizations: Organization of American States	
United States	Seattle	Consulate-General	International Organizations: Organization of American States	
Uruguay	Montevideo	Embassy		
Venezuela	Caracas	Embassy		

=== Asia ===
Host country	Host city	Mission	Concurrent accreditation	Ref.
Afghanistan	Kabul	Embassy		
Armenia	Yerevan	Embassy		
Azerbaijan	Baku	Embassy		
Bahrain	Manama	Embassy		
Bangladesh	Dhaka	High Commission		
Bangladesh	Chittagong	Assistant High Commission		
Bangladesh	Khulna	Assistant High Commission		
Bangladesh	Rajshahi	Assistant High Commission		
Bangladesh	Sylhet	Assistant High Commission		
Bhutan	Thimphu	Embassy		
Bhutan	Phuntsholing	Consulate-General		
Brunei	Bandar Seri Begawan	High Commission		
Cambodia	Phnom Penh	Embassy		
China	Beijing	Embassy		
China	Guangzhou	Consulate-General		
China	Hong Kong	Consulate-General		
China	Shanghai	Consulate-General		
Georgia	Tbilisi	Embassy		
Indonesia	Jakarta	Embassy		
Indonesia	Denpasar	Consulate-General		
Indonesia	Medan	Consulate-General		
Iran	Tehran	Embassy		
Iran	Bandar Abbas	Consulate-General		
Iran	Zahedan	Consulate-General		
Iraq	Baghdad	Embassy		
Iraq	Erbil	Consulate-General		
Israel	Tel Aviv	Embassy		
Japan	Tokyo	Embassy	Countries: Marshall Islands	
Japan	Fukuoka	Consulate-General	Countries: Marshall Islands	
Japan	Osaka	Consulate-General	Countries: Marshall Islands	
Jordan	Amman	Embassy		
Kazakhstan	Astana	Embassy		
Kuwait	Kuwait City	Embassy		
Kyrgyzstan	Bishkek	Embassy		
Laos	Vientiane	Embassy		
Lebanon	Beirut	Embassy		
Malaysia	Kuala Lumpur	High Commission		
Maldives	Malé	High Commission		
Mongolia	Ulaanbaatar	Embassy		
Myanmar	Yangon	Embassy		
Myanmar	Mandalay	Consulate-General		
Myanmar	Sittwe	Consulate-General		
Nepal	Kathmandu	Embassy		
Nepal	Birgunj	Consulate-General		
North Korea	Pyongyang	Embassy		
Oman	Muscat	Embassy		
Pakistan	Islamabad	High Commission		
Palestine	Ramallah	Representative office		
Philippines	Manila	Embassy	Countries: Palau; Micronesia	
Qatar	Doha	Embassy		
Saudi Arabia	Riyadh	Embassy		
Saudi Arabia	Jeddah	Consulate-General		
Singapore	Singapore	High Commission		
Sri Lanka	Colombo	High Commission		
Sri Lanka	Hambantota	Consulate-General		
Sri Lanka	Jaffna	Consulate-General		
Sri Lanka	Kandy	Assistant High Commission		
South Korea	Seoul	Embassy		
Syria	Damascus	Embassy		
Republic of China (Taiwan)	Taipei	Association		
Tajikistan	Dushanbe	Embassy		
Thailand	Bangkok	Embassy		
Thailand	Chiang Mai	Consulate		
Timor-Leste	Dili	Embassy		
Turkey	Ankara	Embassy		
Turkey	Istanbul	Consulate-General		
Turkmenistan	Ashgabat	Embassy		
United Arab Emirates	Abu Dhabi	Embassy		
United Arab Emirates	Dubai	Consulate-General		
Uzbekistan	Tashkent	Embassy		
Vietnam	Hanoi	Embassy		
Vietnam	Ho Chi Minh City	Consulate-General		
Yemen	Aden	Representative office		India officially operationalized its representative office in the temporary capital of Aden, Yemen, on October 1, 2025.

=== Europe ===
Host country	Host city	Mission	Concurrent accreditation	Ref.
Albania	Tirana	Embassy		
Austria	Vienna	Embassy	Countries: Holy See; Montenegro; International Organizations: United Nations; International Atomic Energy Agency; United Nations Industrial Development Organization; United Nations Office on Drugs and Crime; United Nations Commission on International Trade Law	
Belarus	Minsk	Embassy		
Belgium	Brussels	Embassy	Countries: Luxembourg; International Organizations: European Union	
Bulgaria	Sofia	Embassy	Countries: North Macedonia	
Croatia	Zagreb	Embassy		
Cyprus	Nicosia	High Commission		
Czech Republic	Prague	Embassy		
Denmark	Copenhagen	Embassy		
Estonia	Tallinn	Embassy		
Finland	Helsinki	Embassy		
France	Paris	Embassy	Countries: Monaco	
France	Marseille	Consulate-General	Countries: Monaco	
France	Saint-Denis, Réunion	Consulate-General	Countries: Monaco	
Germany	Berlin	Embassy		
Germany	Frankfurt	Consulate-General		
Germany	Hamburg	Consulate-General		
Germany	Munich	Consulate-General		
Greece	Athens	Embassy		
Hungary	Budapest	Embassy	Countries: Bosnia and Herzegovina	
Iceland	Reykjavík	Embassy		
Ireland	Dublin	Embassy		
Italy	Rome	Embassy	Countries: San Marino; International Organizations: Food and Agriculture Organization; International Fund for Agricultural Development; World Food Programme	
Italy	Milan	Consulate-General	Countries: San Marino; International Organizations: Food and Agriculture Organization; International Fund for Agricultural Development; World Food Programme	
Latvia	Riga	Embassy		
Lithuania	Vilnius	Embassy		
Malta	Valletta (Note: Although officially titled as an embassy in Valletta, it is physically located in the nearby town of Santa Venera.)	High Commission		
Netherlands	The Hague	Embassy		
Norway	Oslo	Embassy		
Poland	Warsaw	Embassy		
Portugal	Lisbon	Embassy		
Romania	Bucharest	Embassy	Countries: Moldova	
Russia	Moscow	Embassy		
Russia	Kazan	Consulate-General		
Russia	Saint Petersburg	Consulate-General		
Russia	Vladivostok	Consulate-General		
Russia	Yekaterinburg	Consulate-General		
Serbia	Belgrade	Embassy		
Slovakia	Bratislava	Embassy		
Slovenia	Ljubljana	Embassy		
Spain	Madrid	Embassy	Countries: Andorra	
Spain	Barcelona	Consulate-General	Countries: Andorra	
Sweden	Stockholm	Embassy		
Switzerland	Bern	Embassy	Countries: Liechtenstein	
Switzerland	Geneva	Consulate-General	Countries: Liechtenstein	
Ukraine	Kyiv	Embassy		
United Kingdom	London	High Commission		
United Kingdom	Belfast	Consulate-General		
United Kingdom	Birmingham	Consulate-General		
United Kingdom	Edinburgh	Consulate-General		
United Kingdom	Manchester	Consulate-General		

=== Oceania ===
Host country	Host city	Mission	Concurrent accreditation	Ref.
Australia	Canberra	High Commission	Countries: Nauru	
Australia	Brisbane	Consulate-General	Countries: Nauru	
Australia	Melbourne	Consulate-General	Countries: Nauru	
Australia	Perth	Consulate-General	Countries: Nauru	
Australia	Sydney	Consulate-General	Countries: Nauru	
Fiji	Suva	High Commission	Countries: Kiribati; Tonga; Tuvalu	
New Zealand	Wellington	High Commission	Countries: Cook Islands; Niue; Samoa; Vanuatu	
New Zealand	Auckland	Consulate-General	Countries: Cook Islands; Niue; Samoa; Vanuatu	
Papua New Guinea	Port Moresby	High Commission	Countries: Solomon Islands	

=== International organisations ===
Organization	Host city	Host country	Mission	Ref(s)
ASEAN	Jakarta	Indonesia	Mission	
United Nations	Geneva	Switzerland	Permanent Mission	
United Nations	Geneva	Switzerland	Conference On Disarmament	
United Nations	New York City	United States	Permanent Mission	
UNESCO	Paris	France	Permanent Mission	

== Gallery ==
Embassies/High Commissions

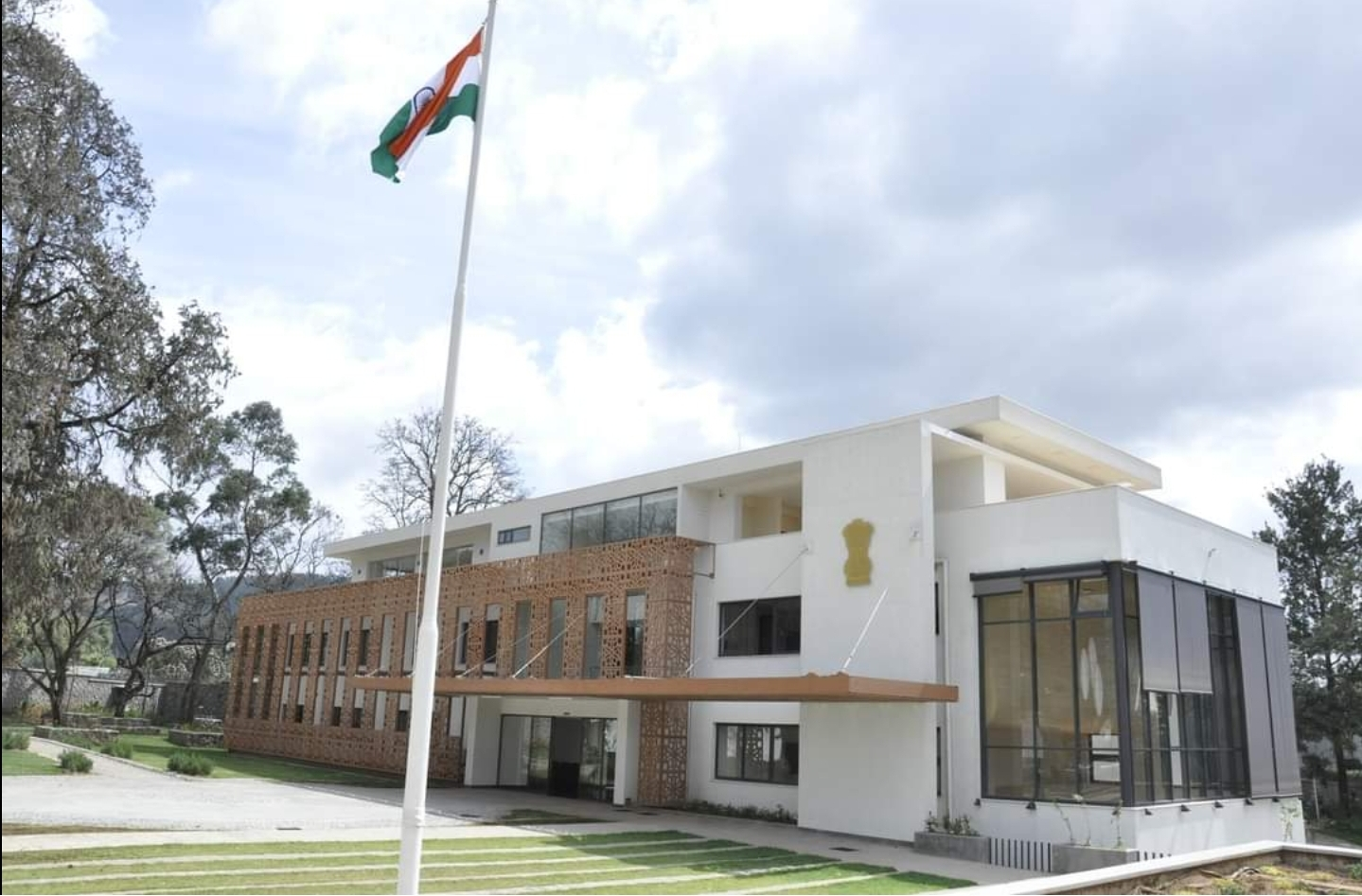
Embassy in Addis Ababa

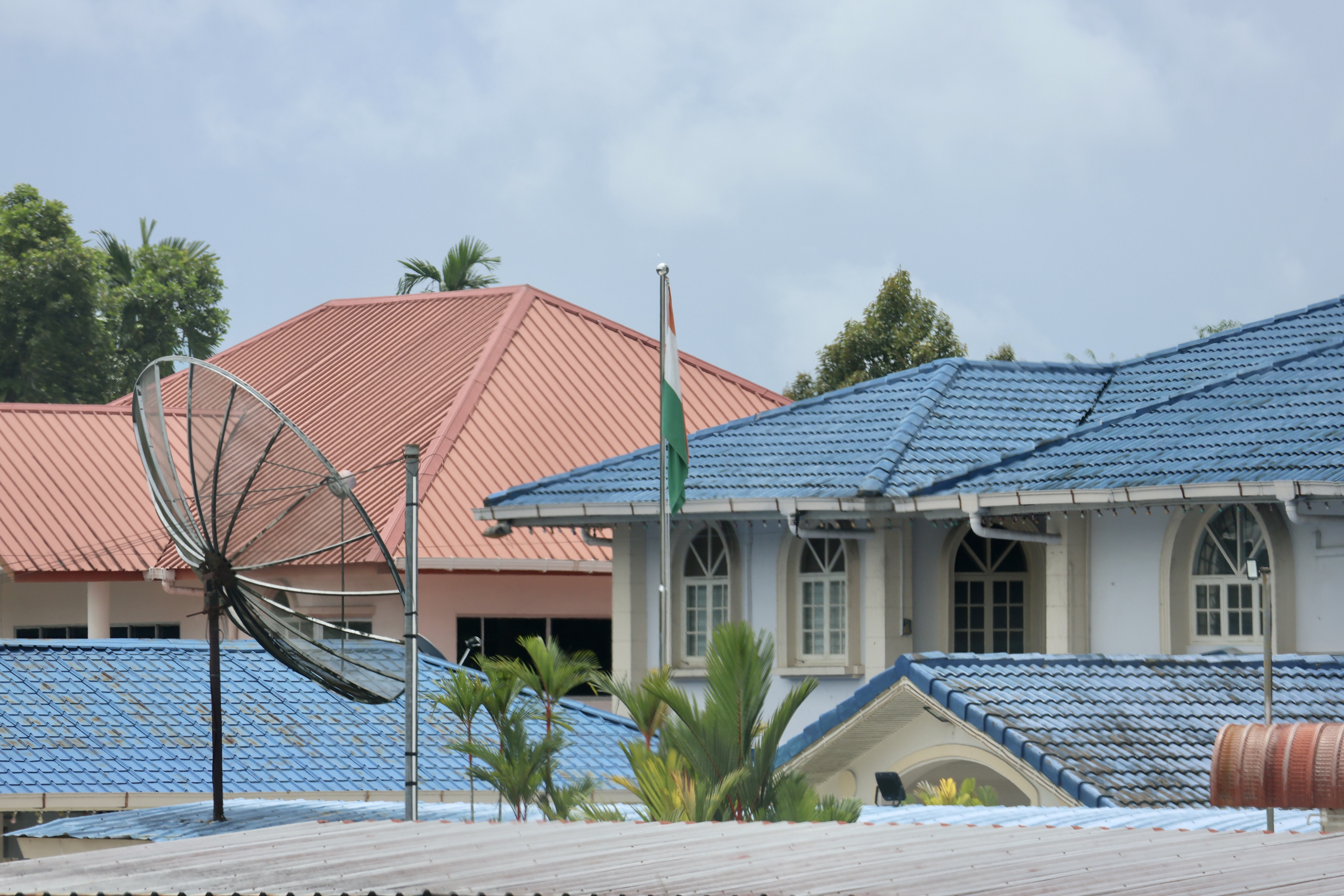
High Commission in Bandar Seri Begawan

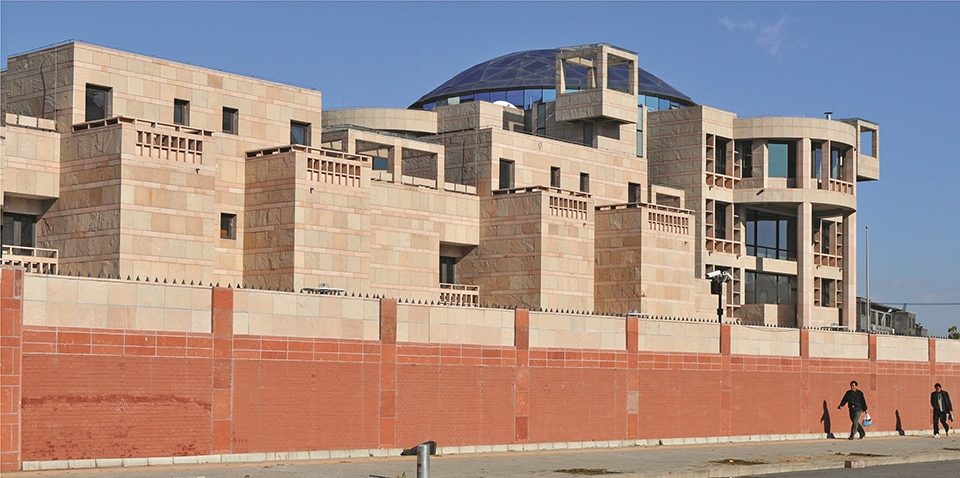
Embassy in Beijing

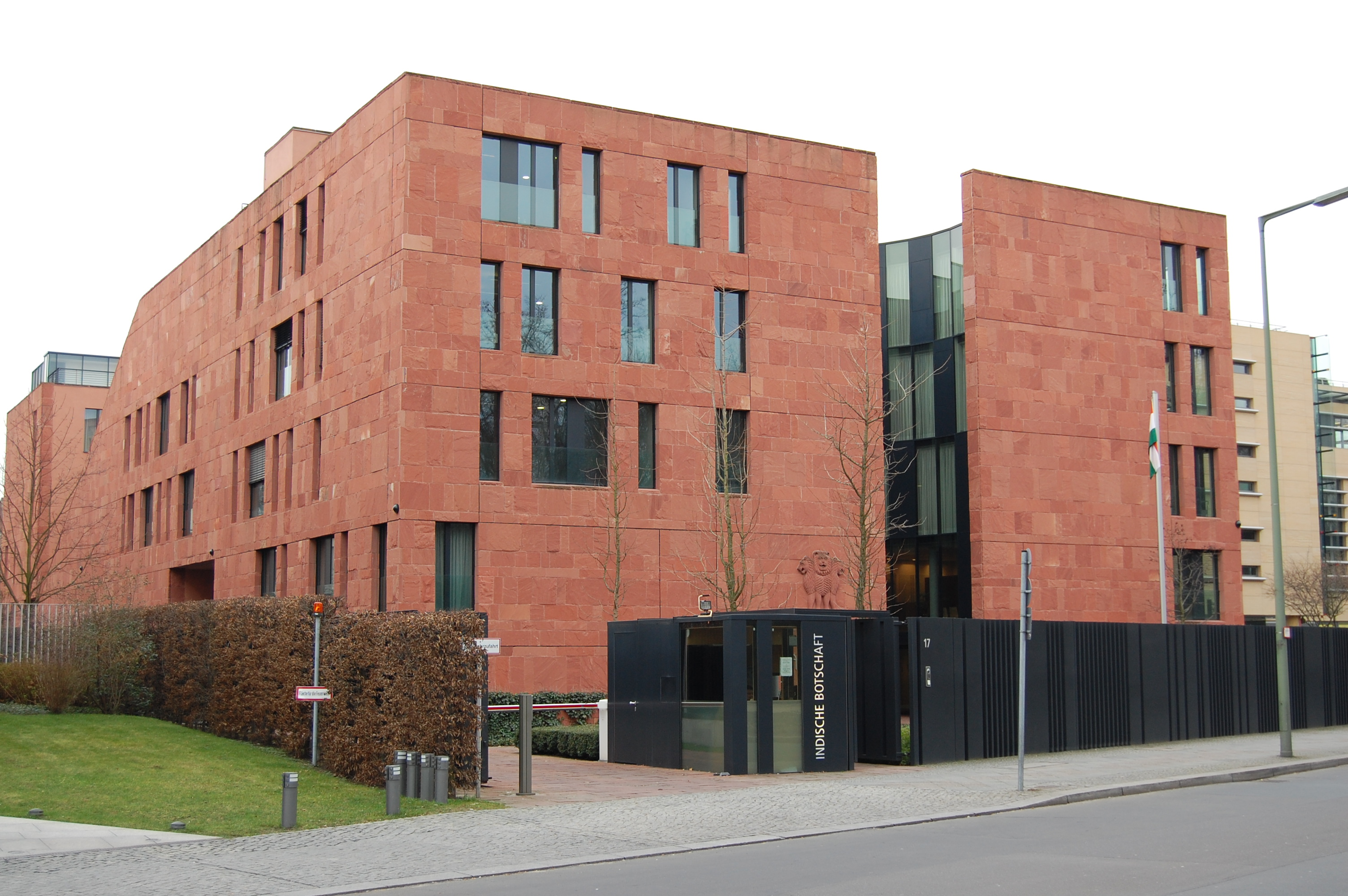
Embassy in Berlin

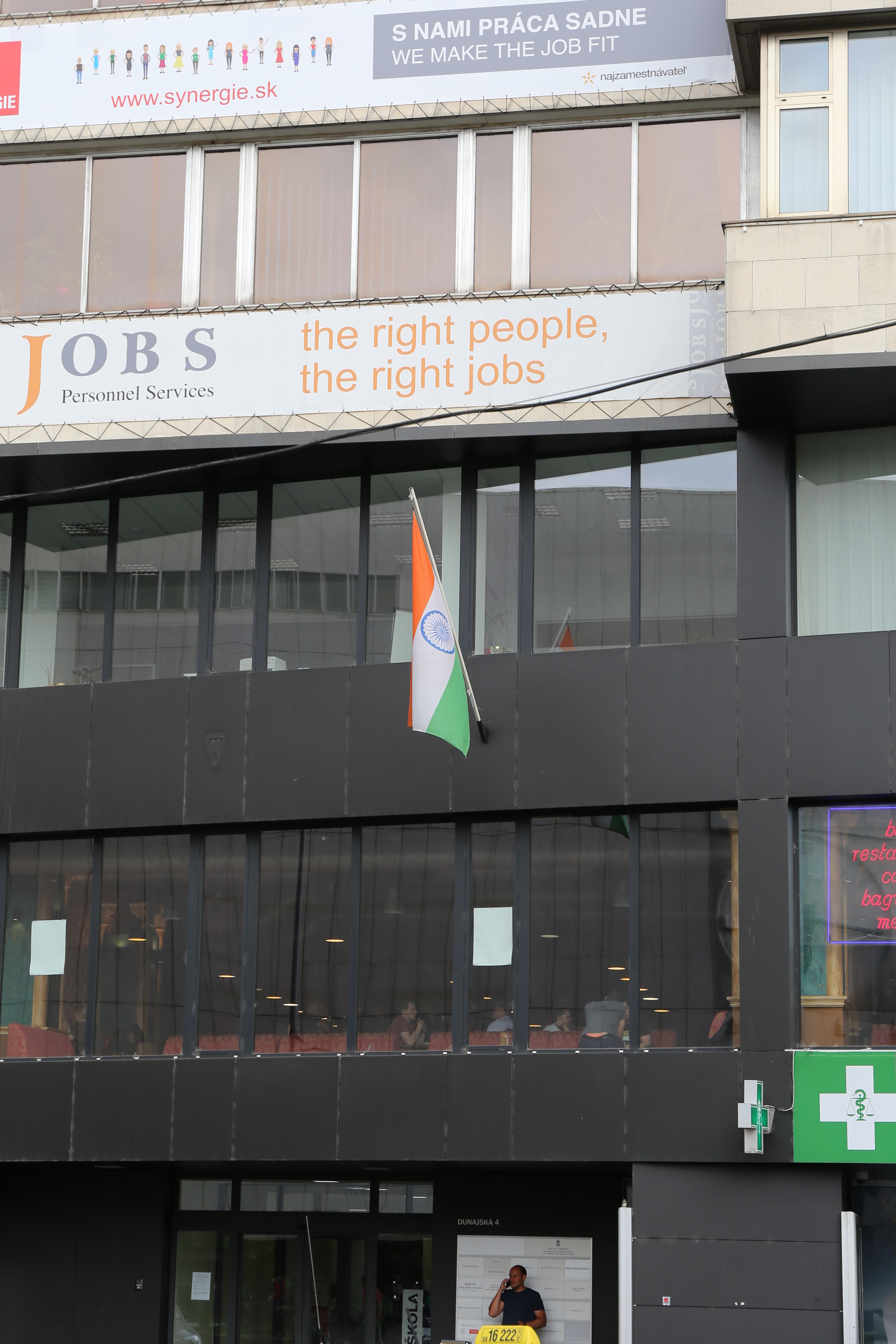
Embassy in Bratislava

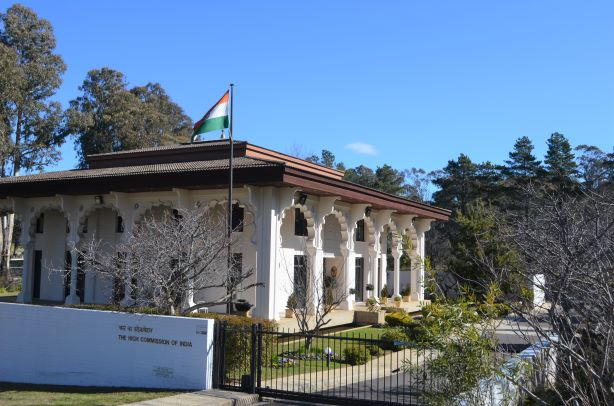
High Commission in Canberra

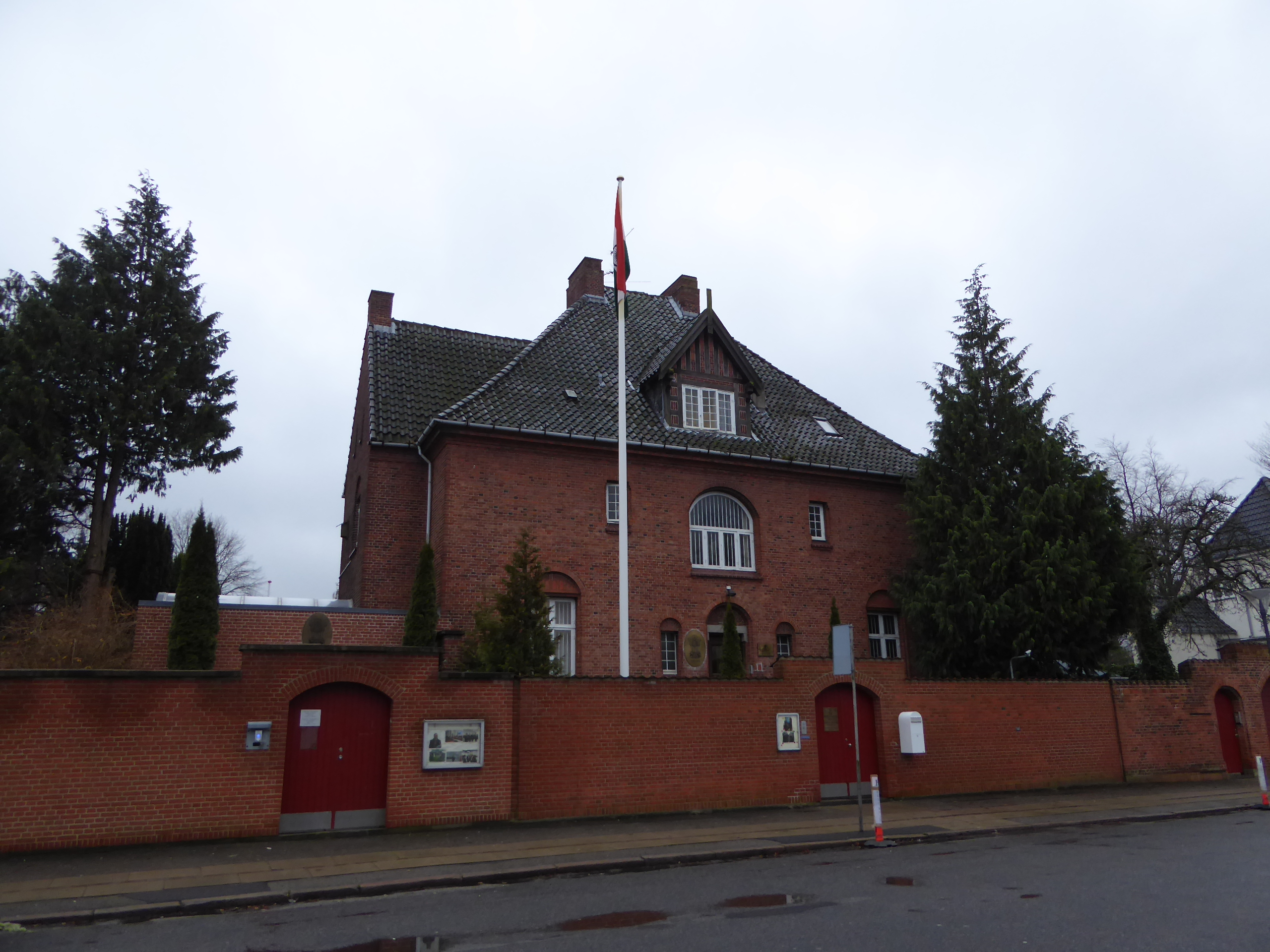
Embassy in Copenhagen

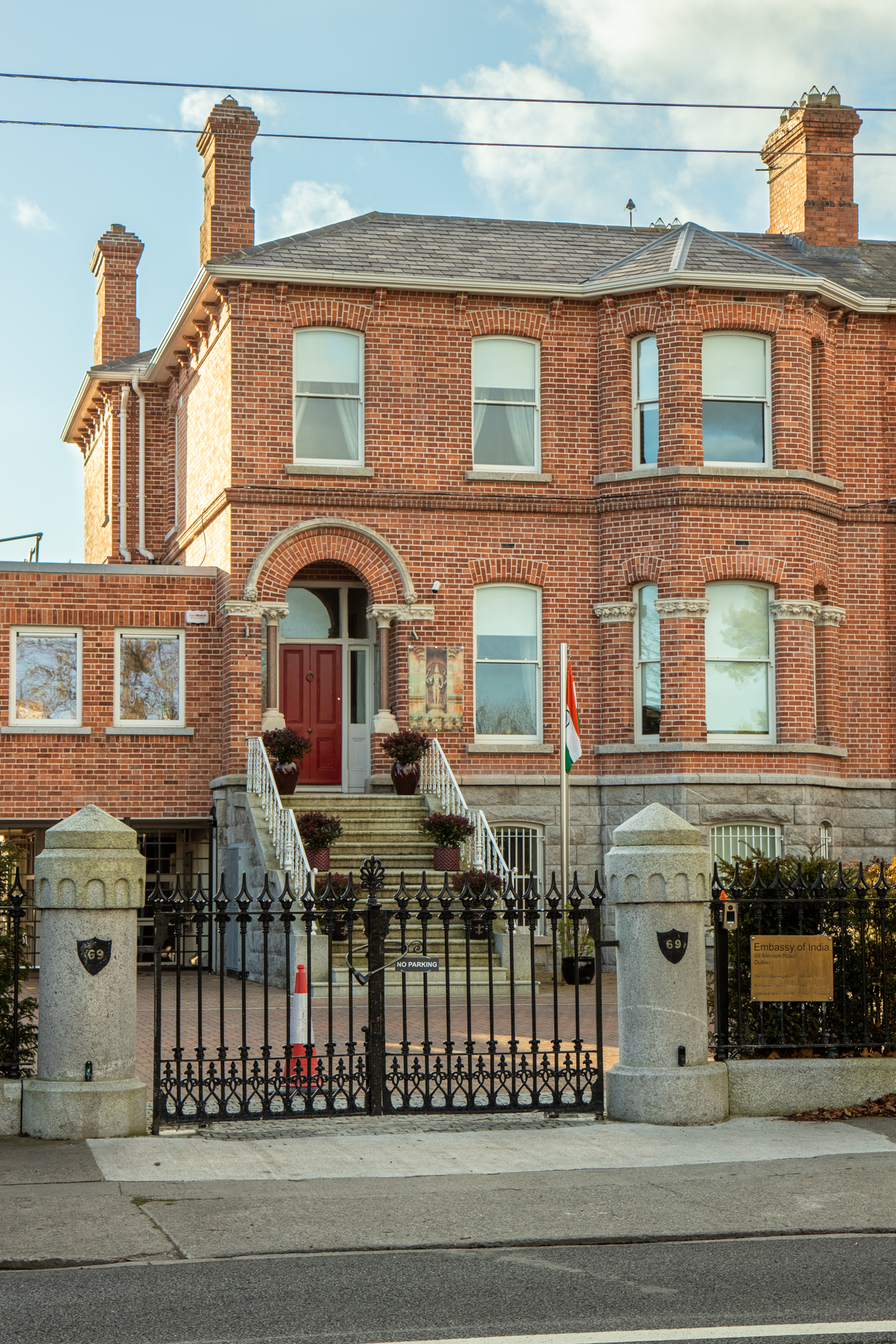
Embassy in Dublin

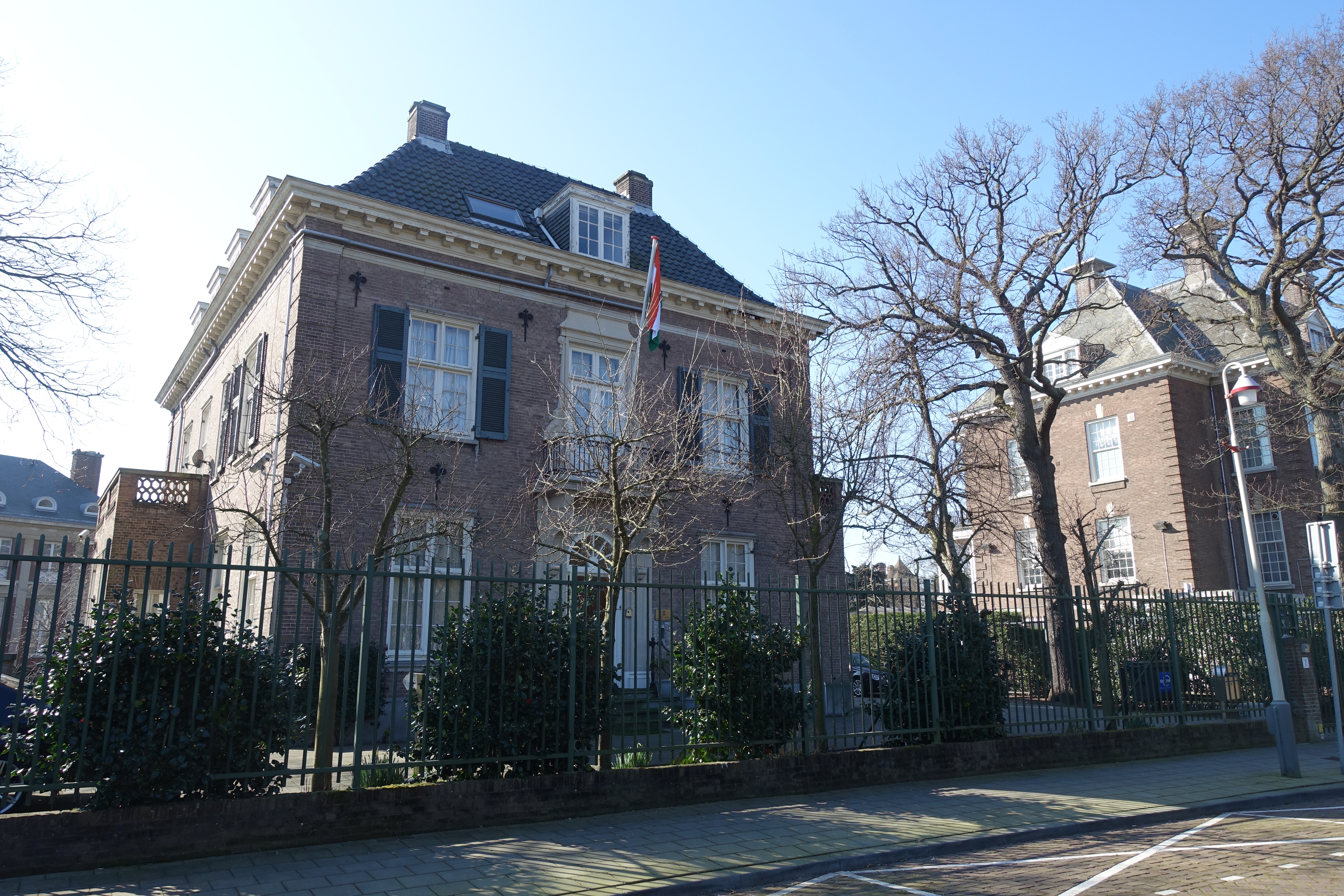
Embassy in The Hague

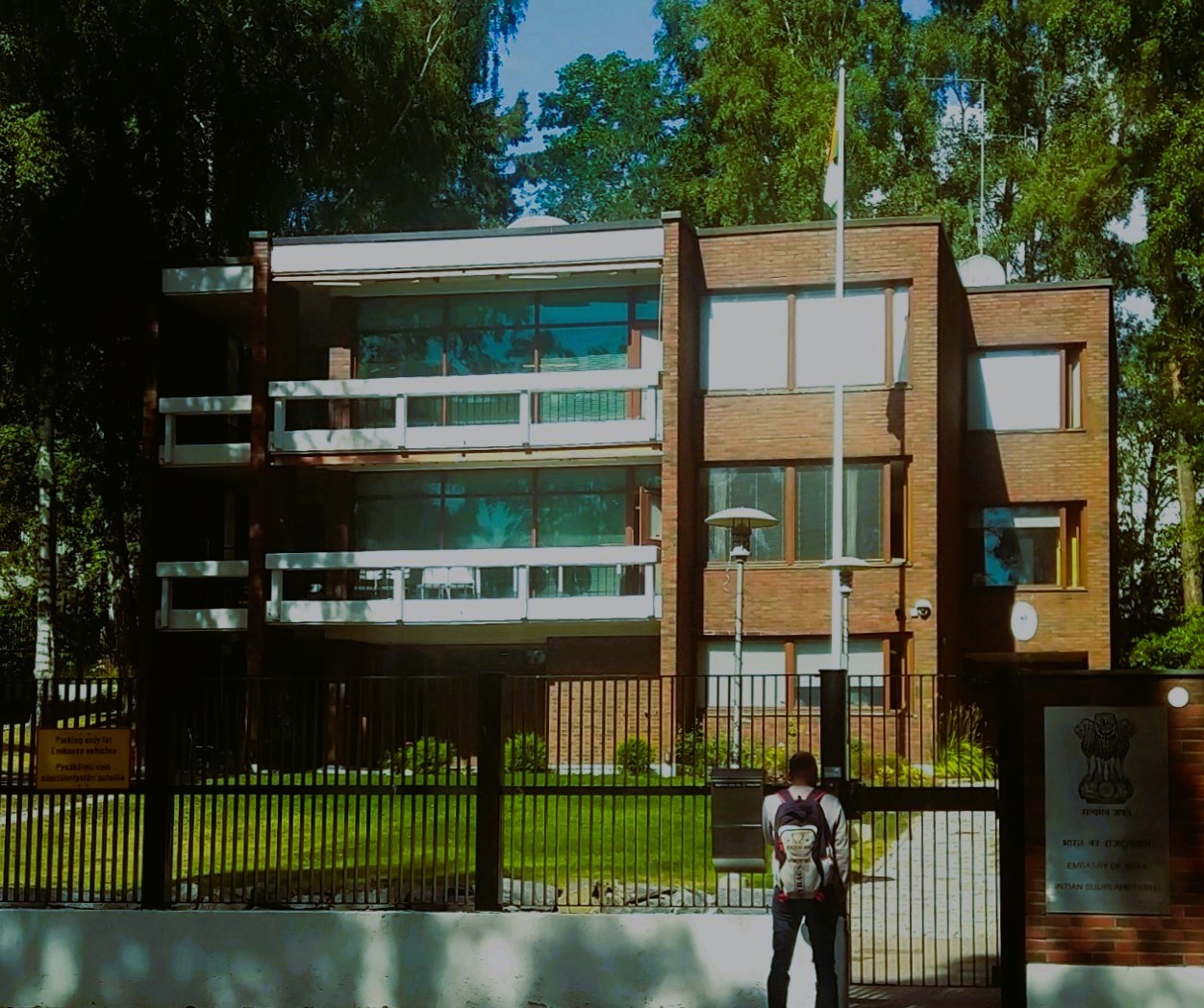
Embassy in Helsinki

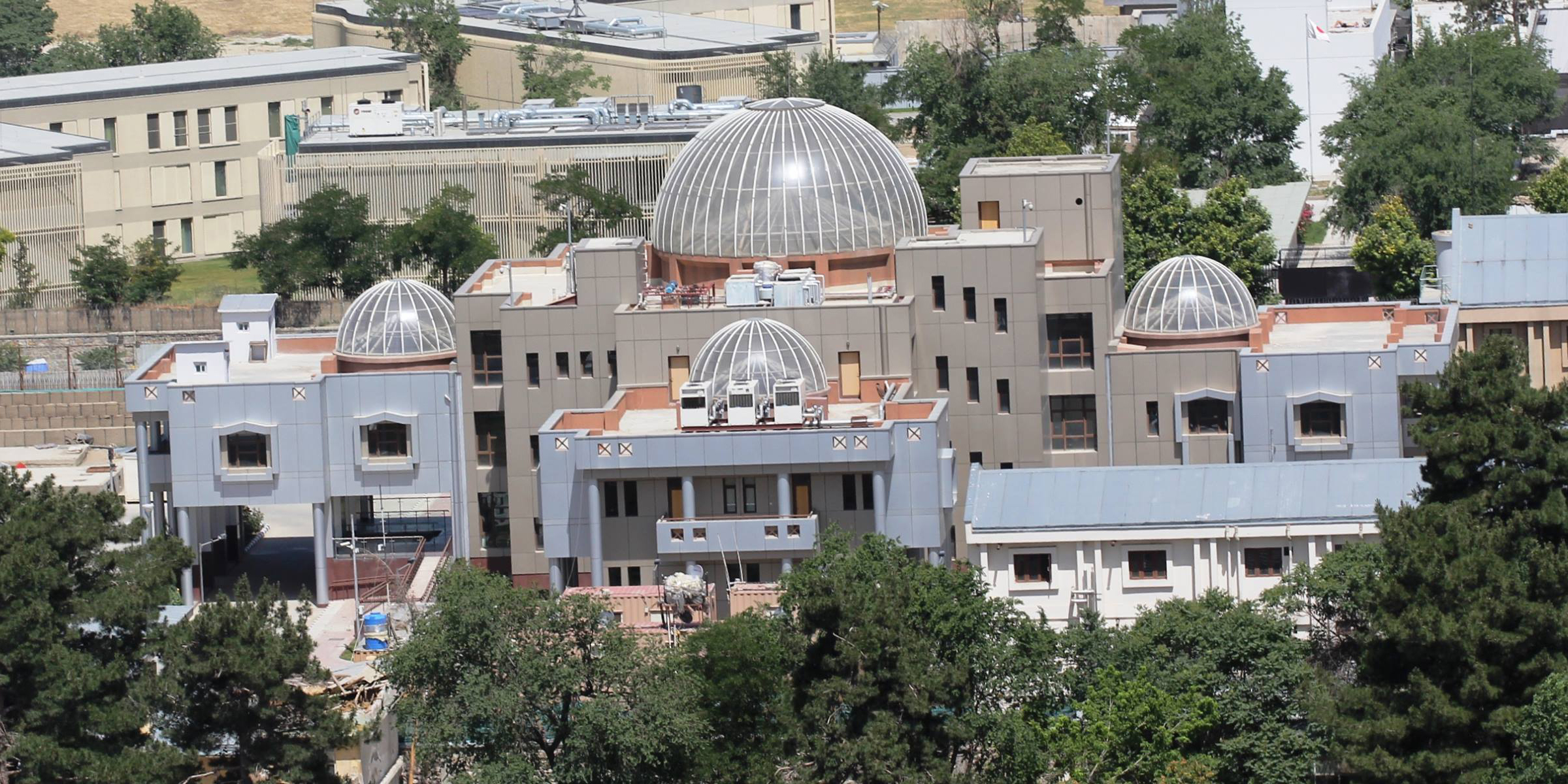
Embassy in Kabul

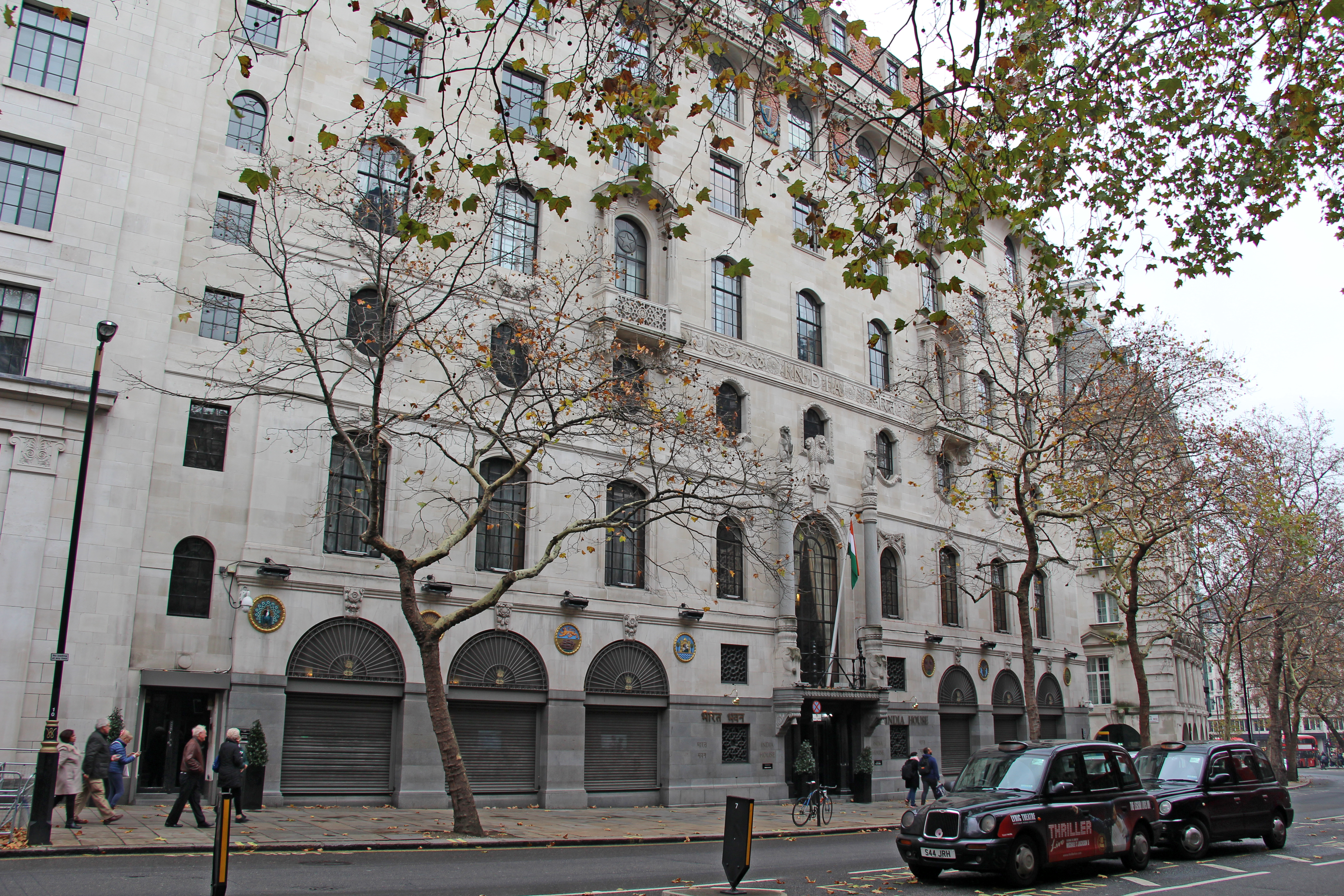
High Commission in London

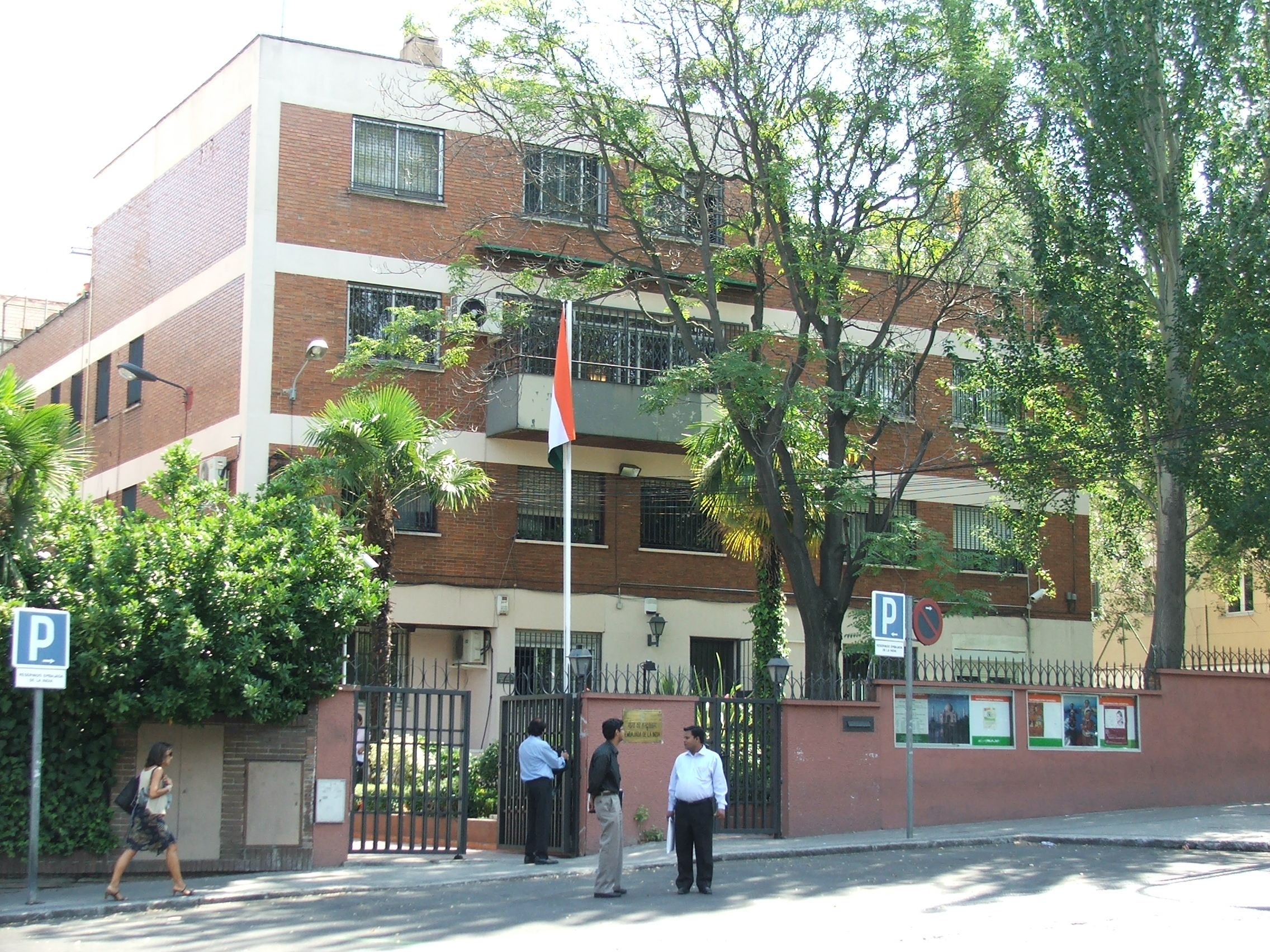
Embassy in Madrid

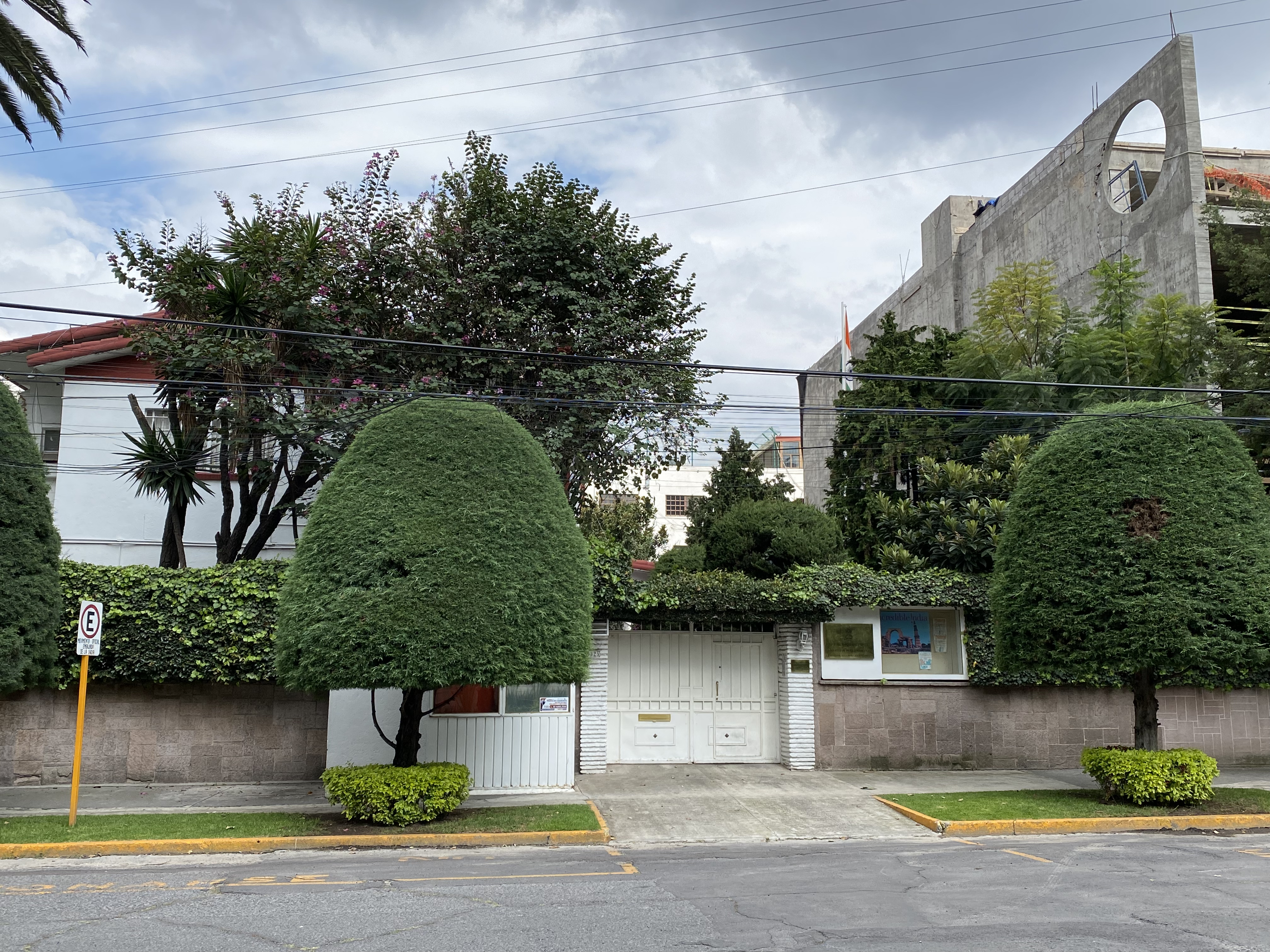
Embassy in Mexico City

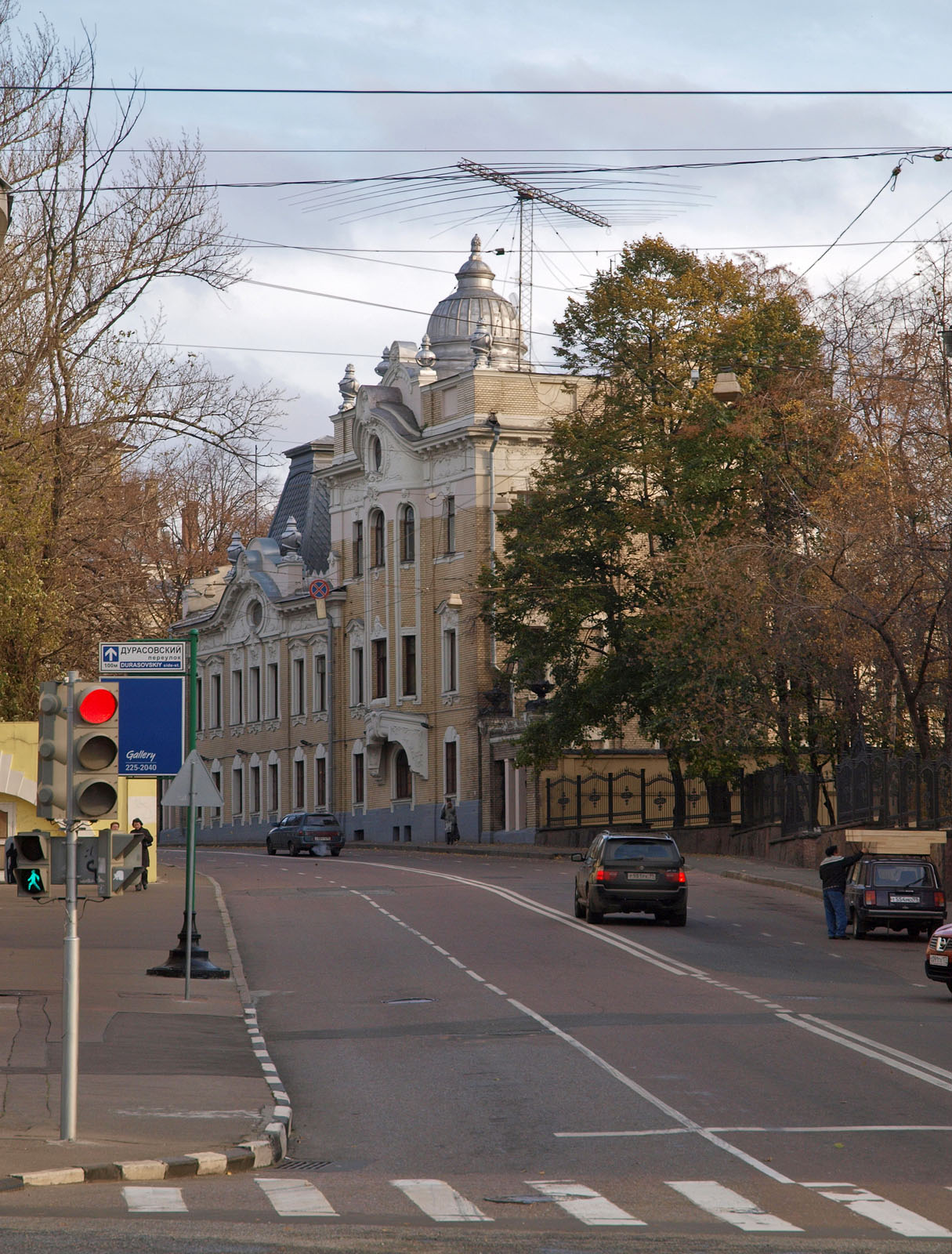
Embassy in Moscow

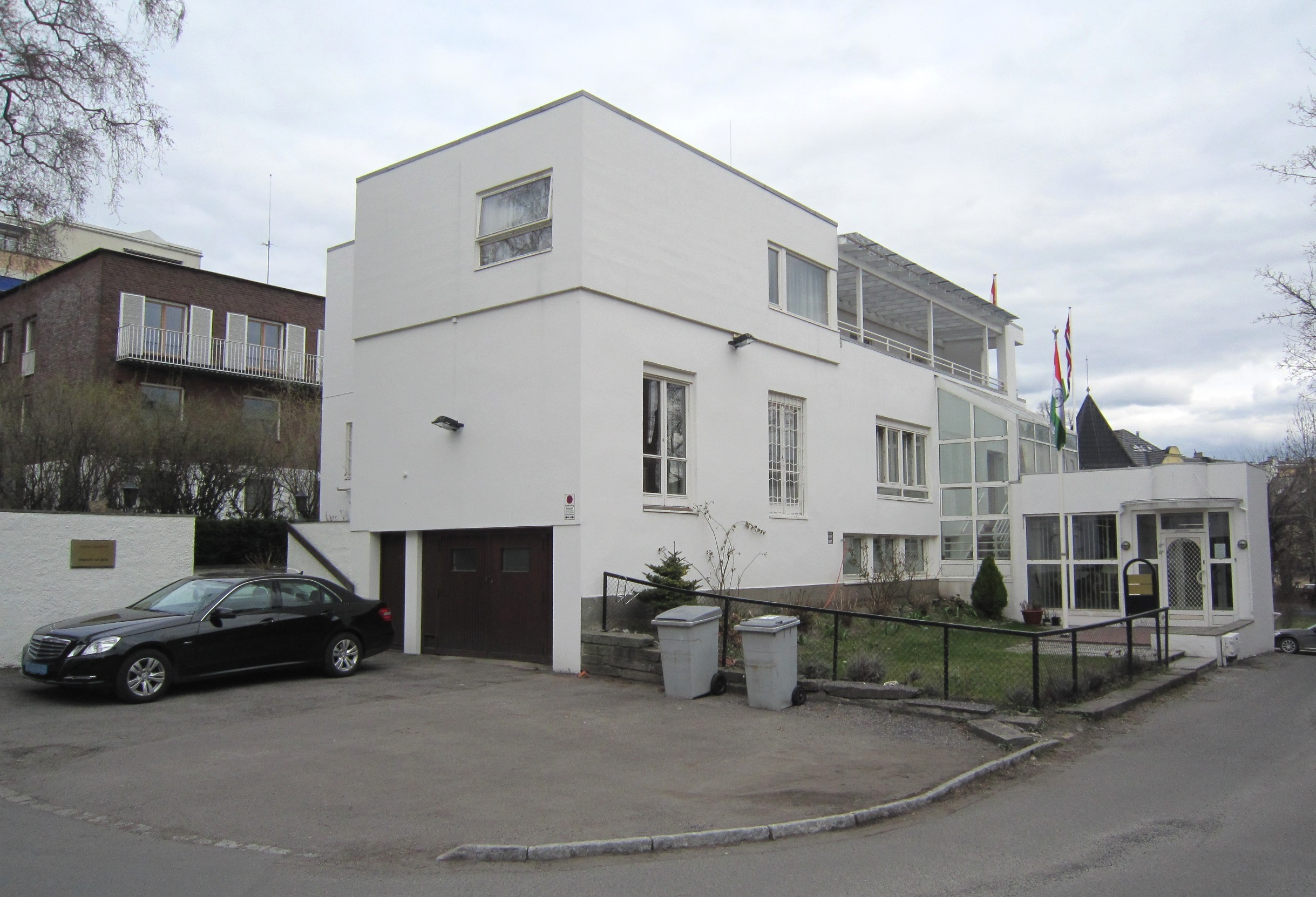
Embassy in Oslo

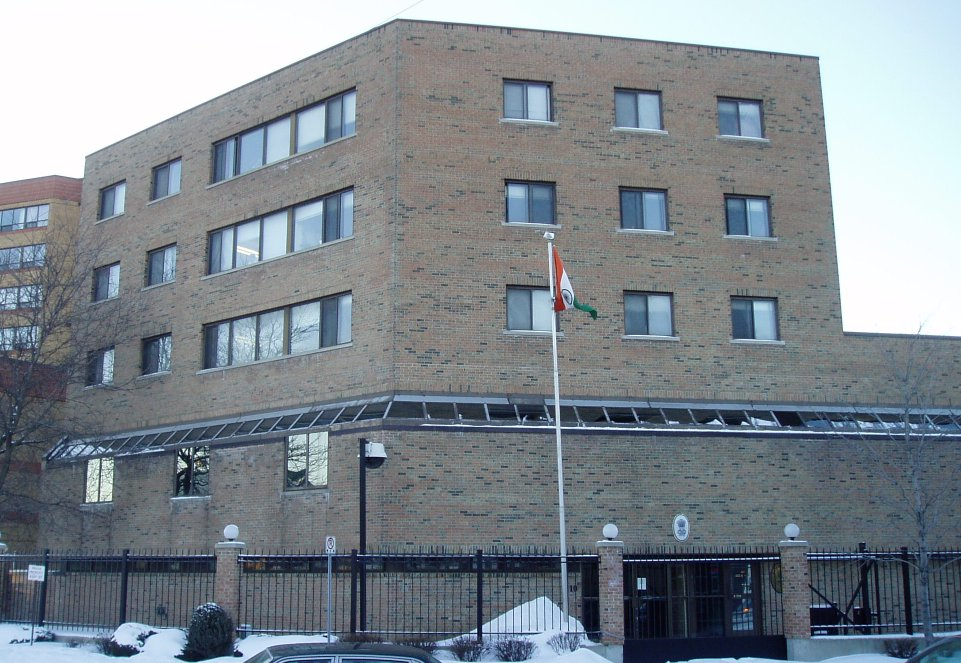
High Commission in Ottawa

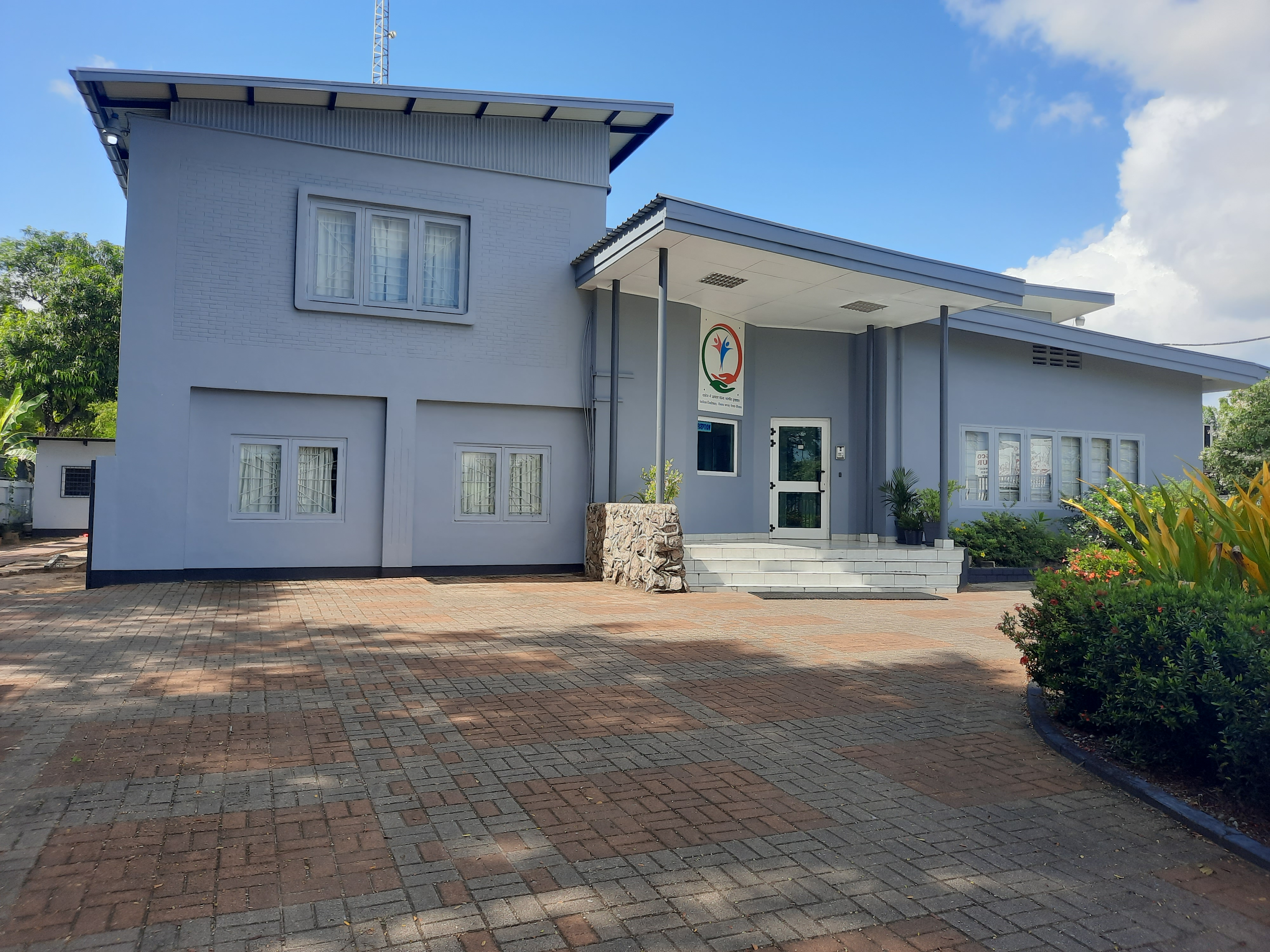
Embassy in Paramaribo

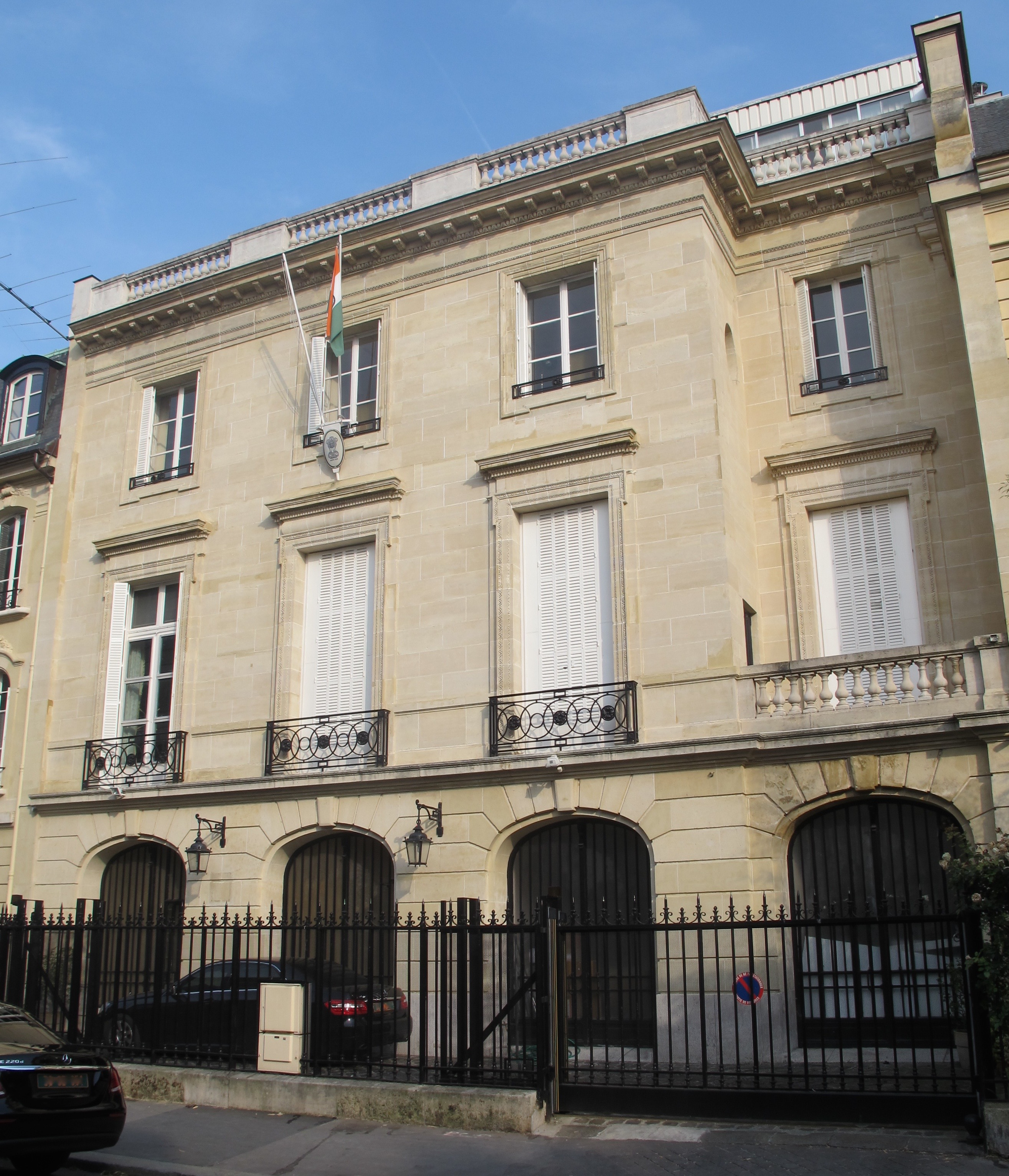
Embassy in Paris

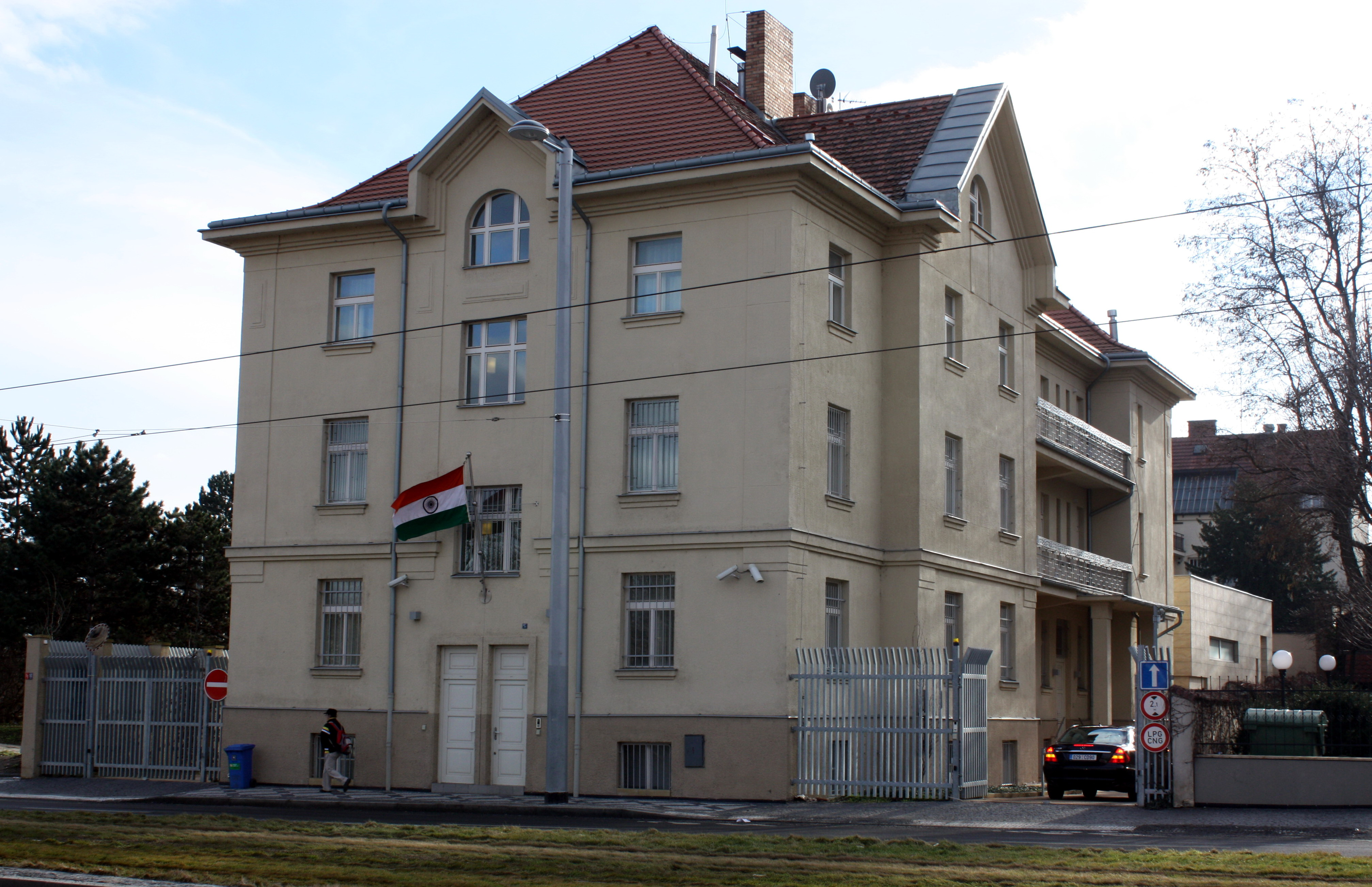
Embassy in Prague

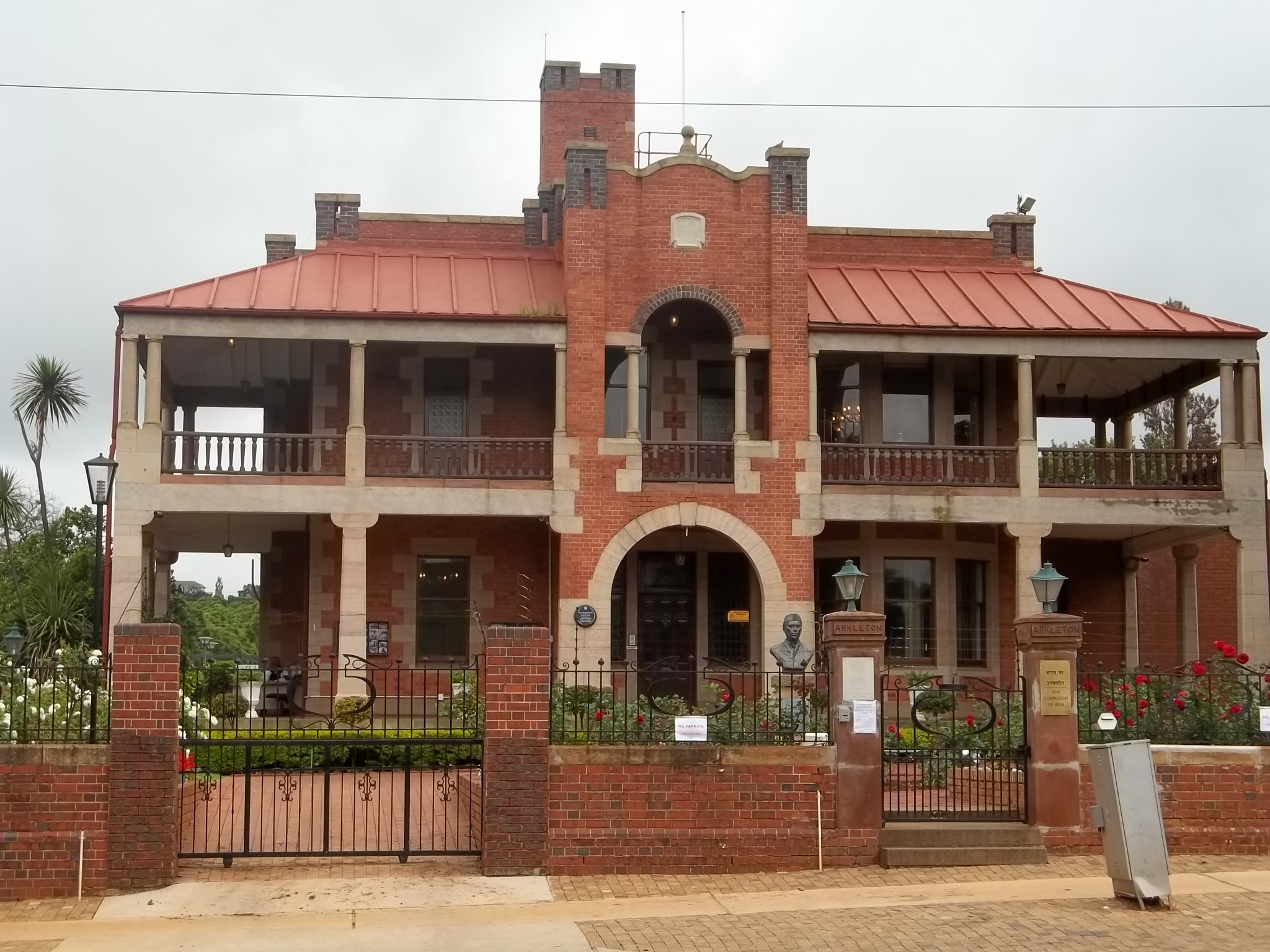
High Commission in Pretoria

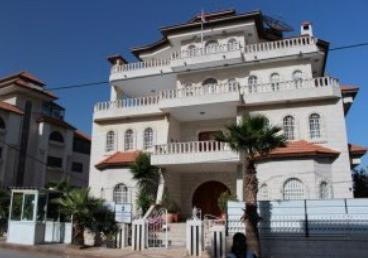
Embassy in Ramallah

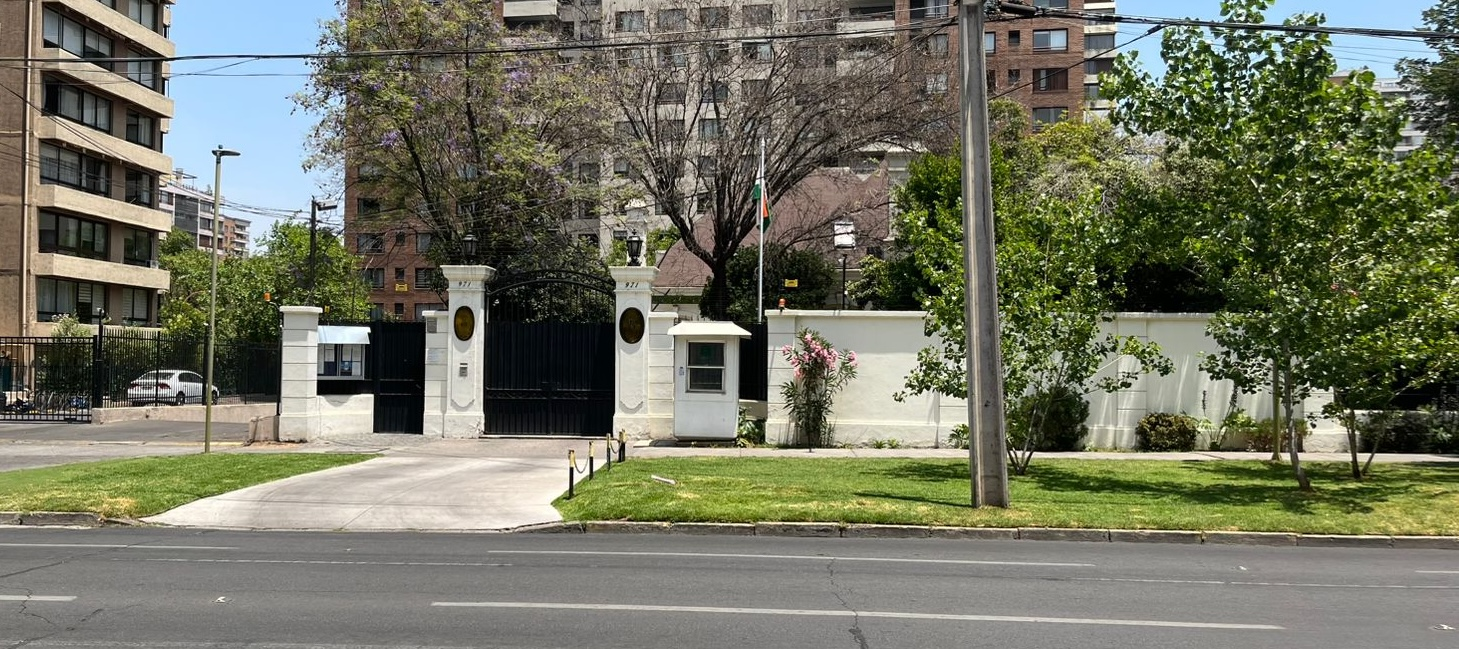
Embassy in Santiago

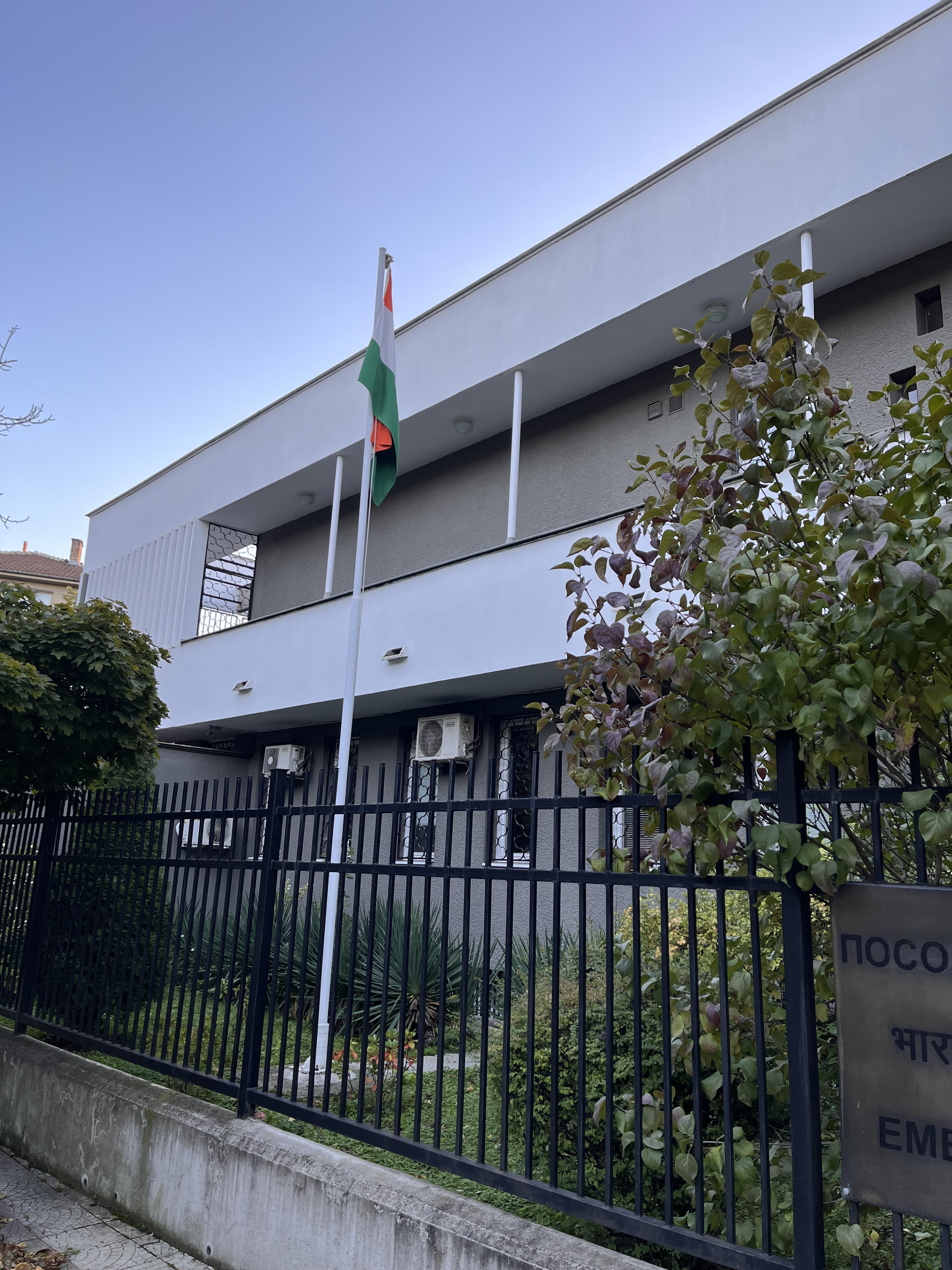
Embassy in Sofia

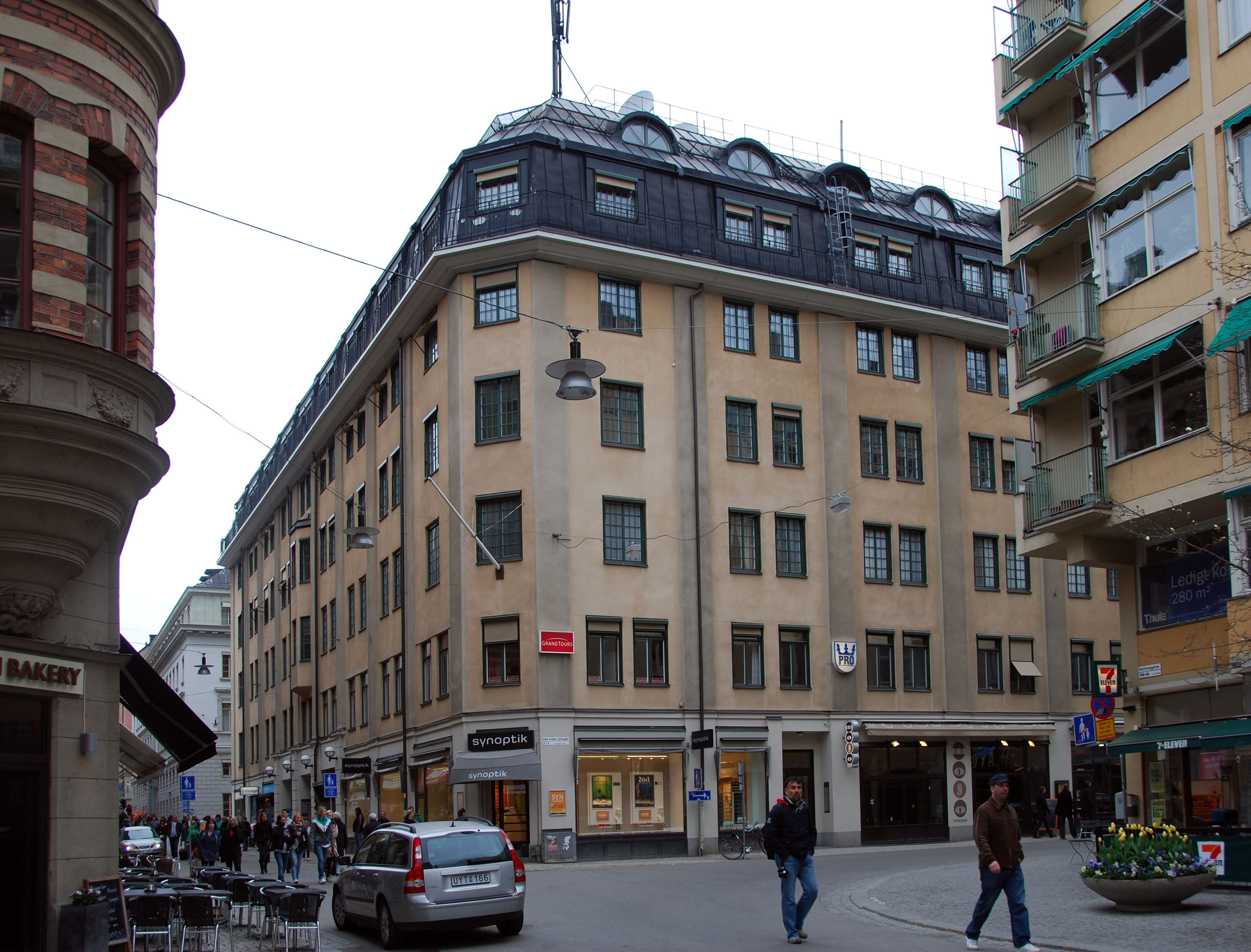
Embassy in Stockholm

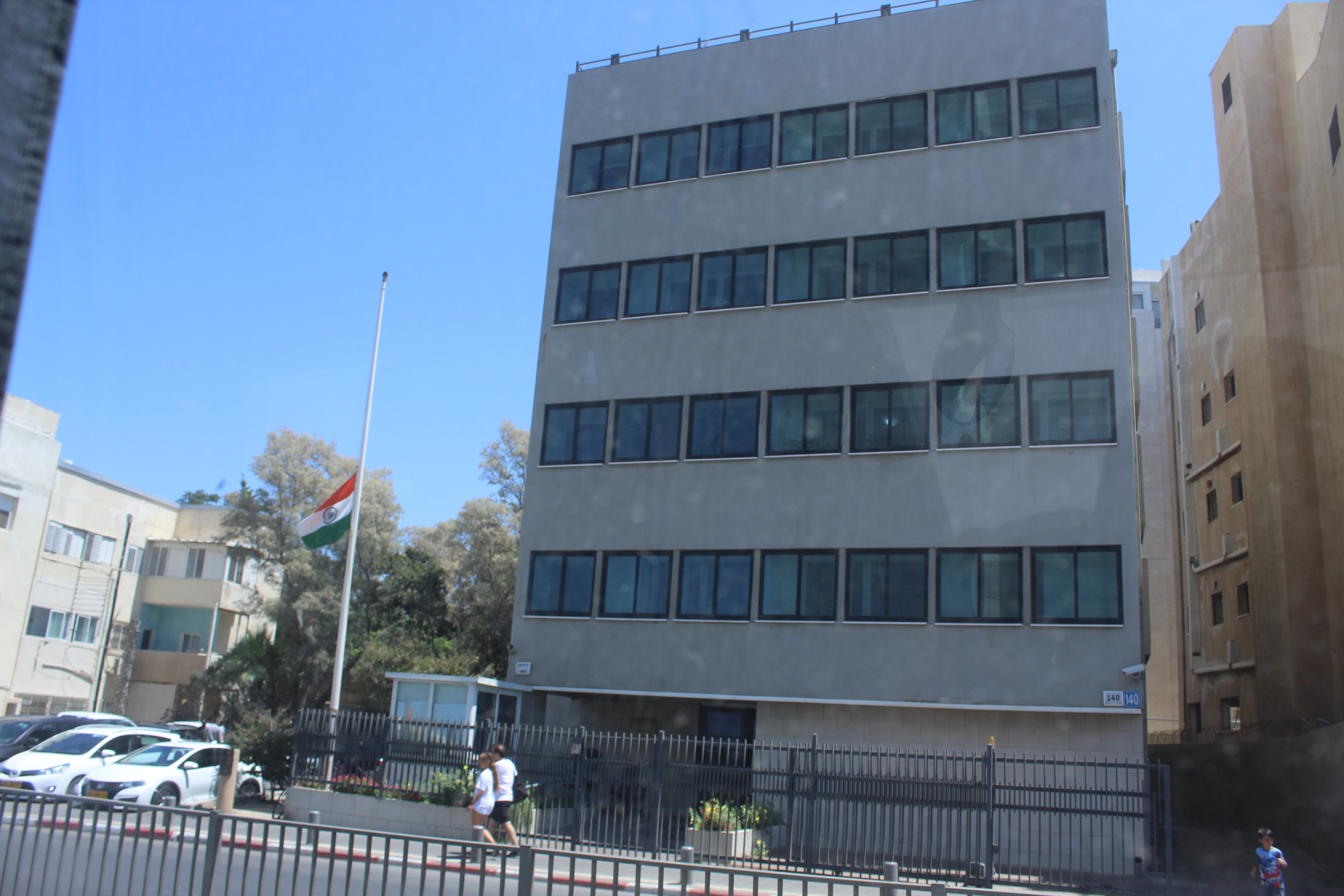
Embassy in Tel Aviv

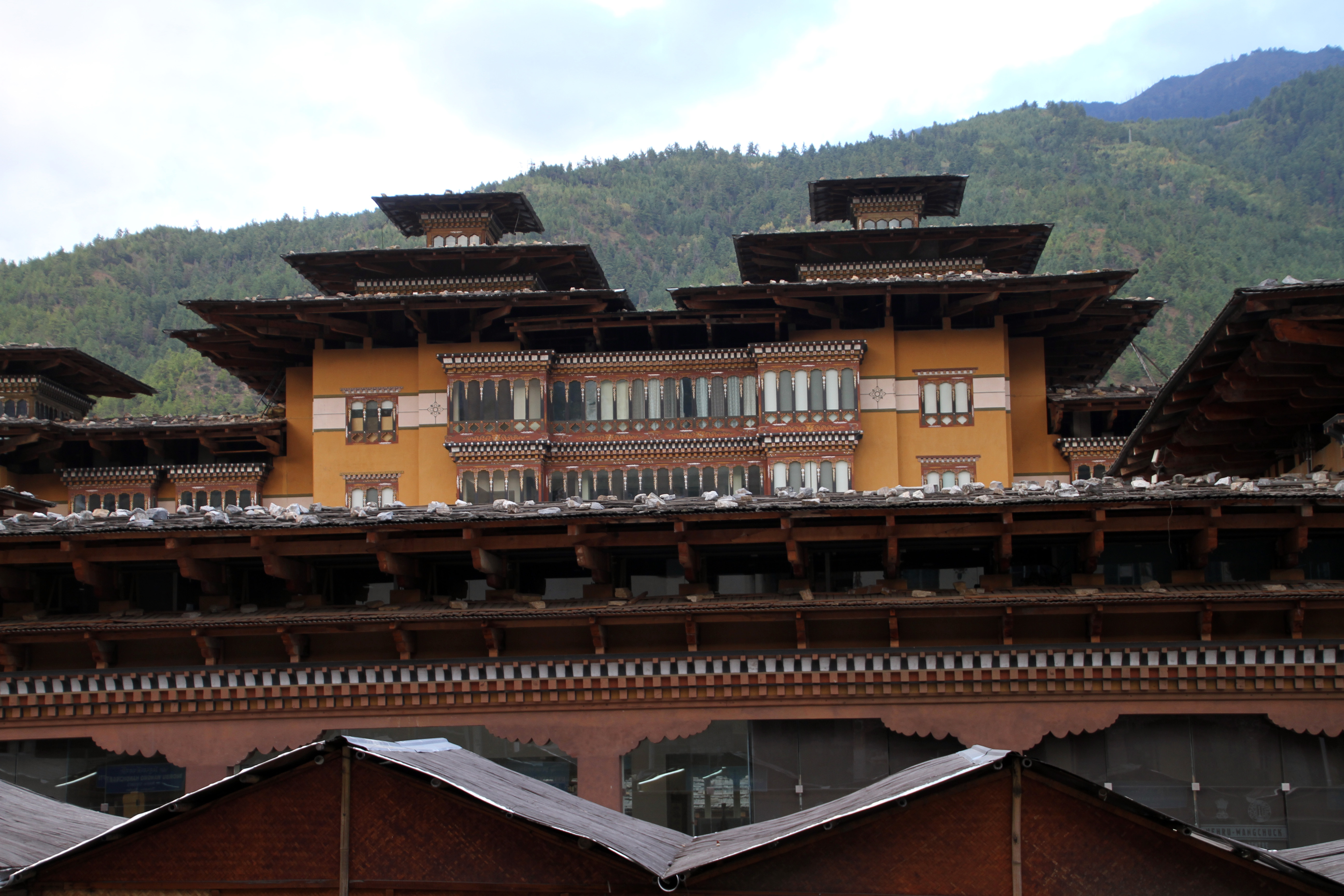
Embassy in Thimphu

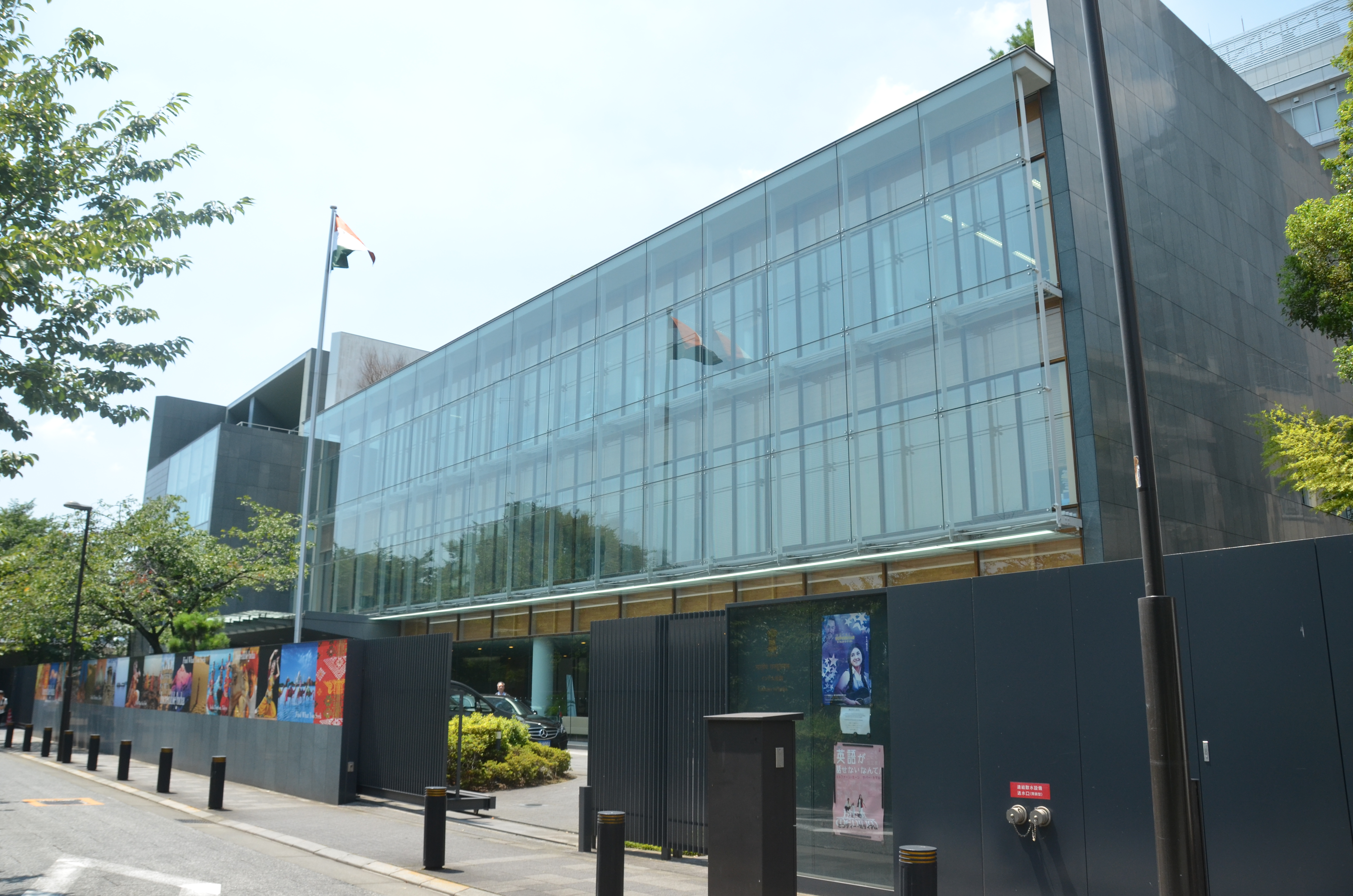
Embassy in Tokyo

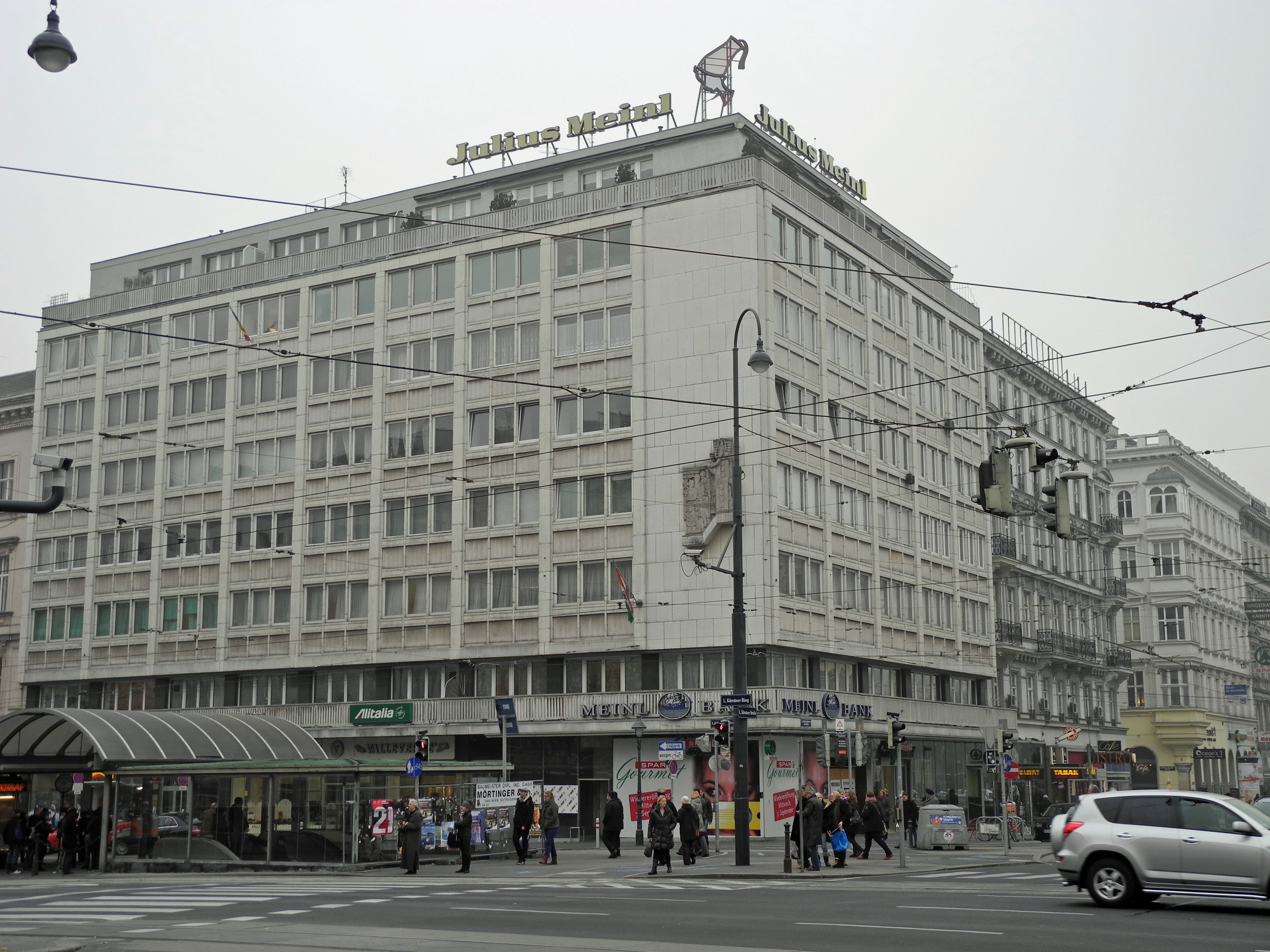
Building hosting the embassy in Vienna

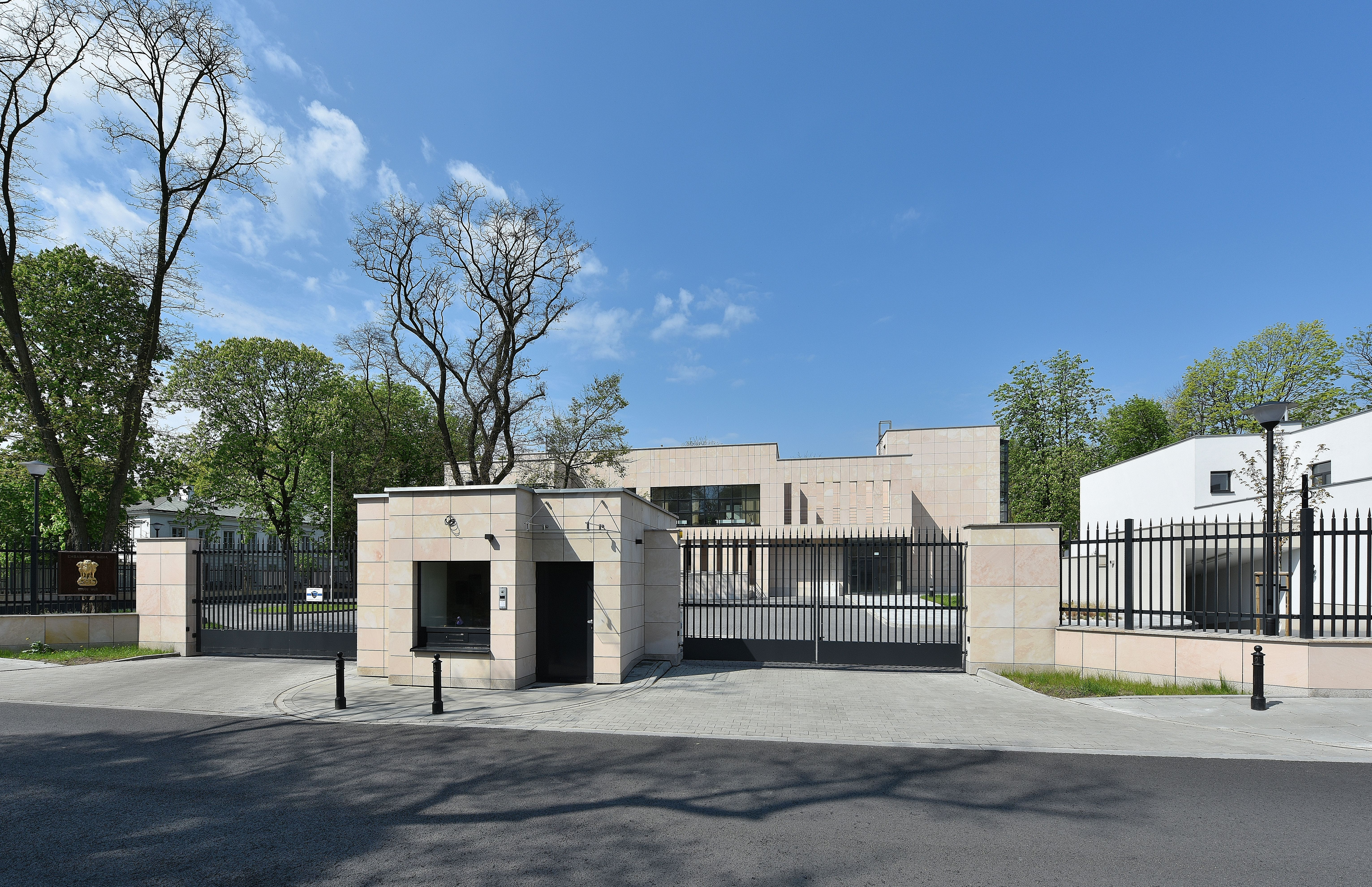
Embassy in Warsaw

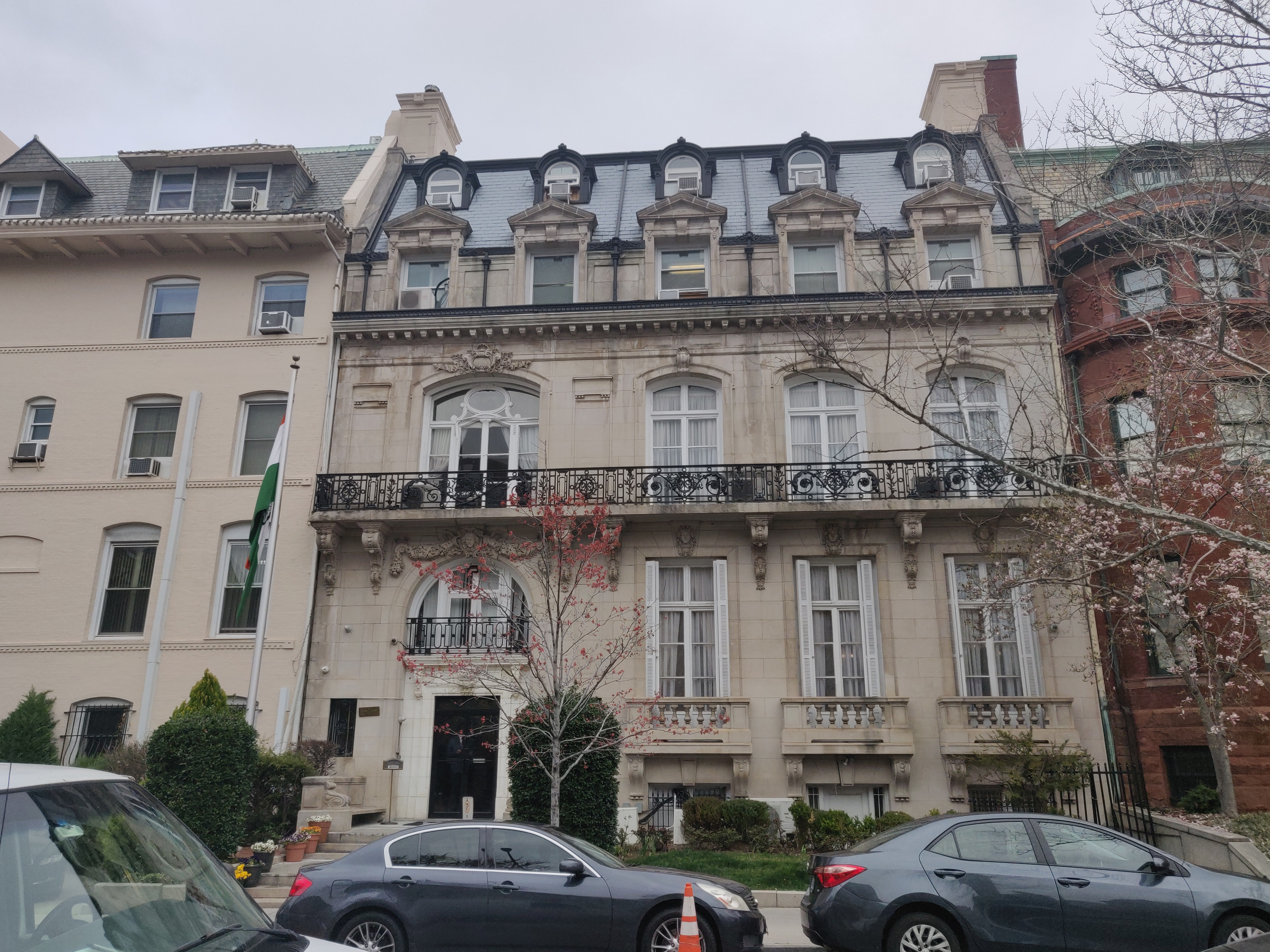
Embassy in Washington, D.C.

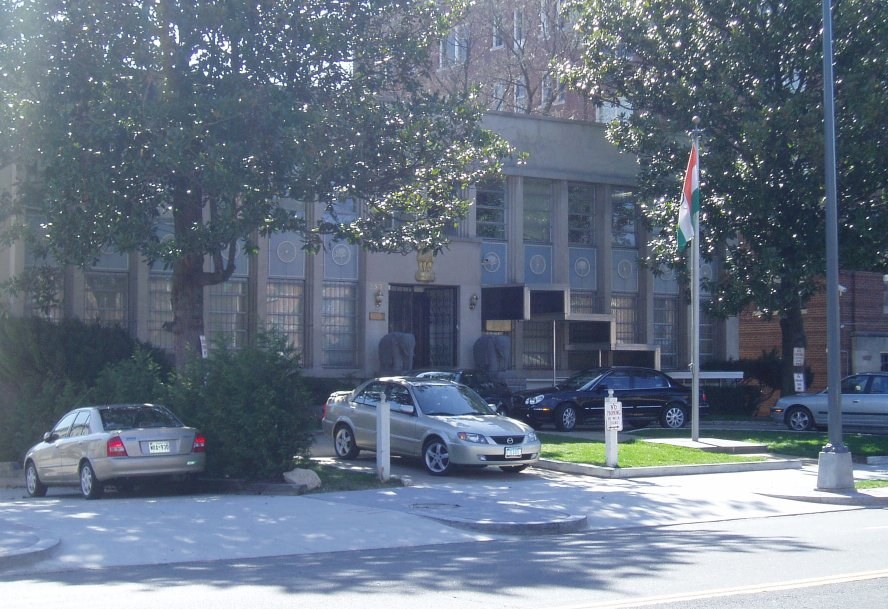
Consular Section in Washington, D.C.

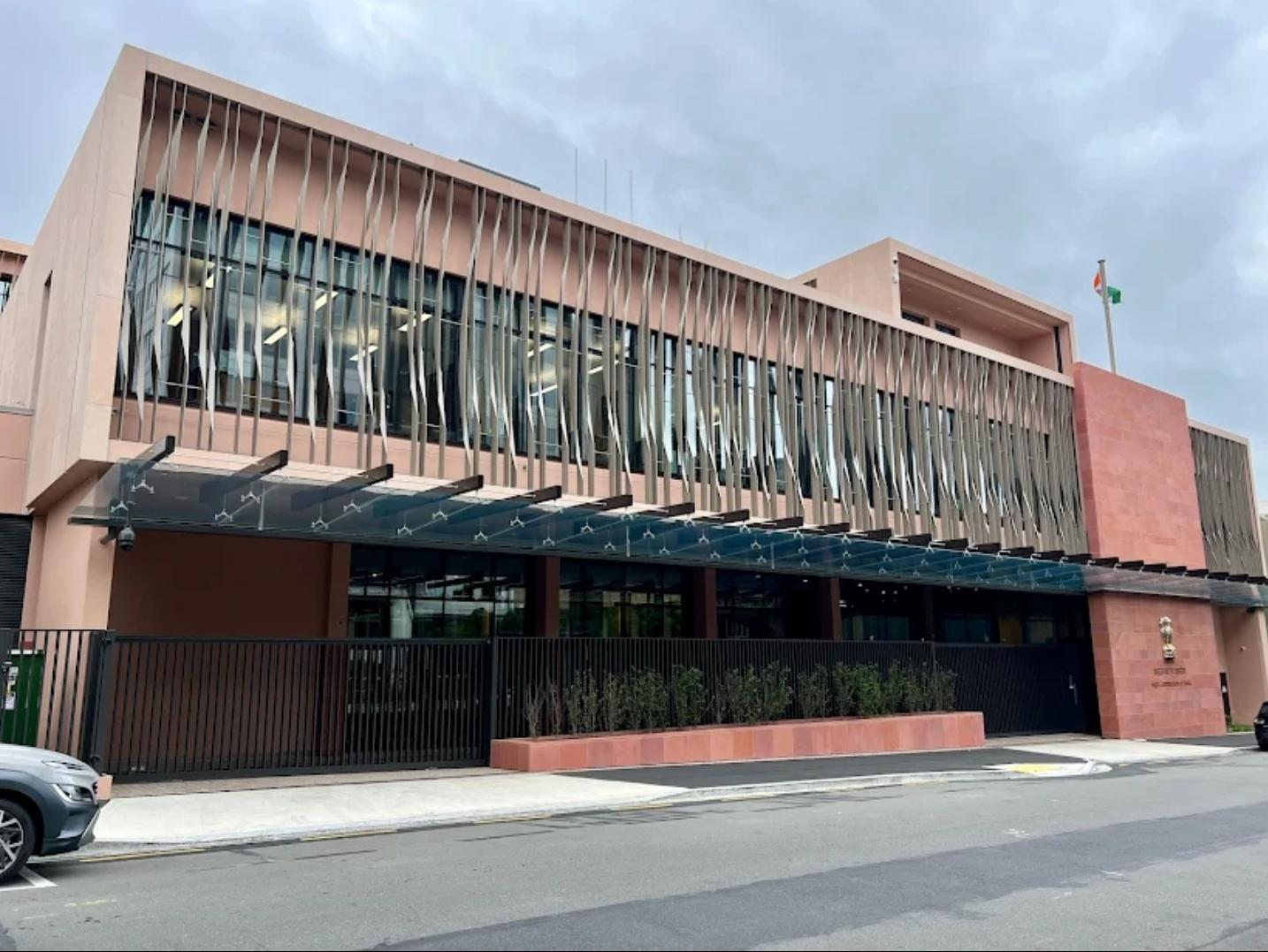
High Commission in Wellington

Consulates

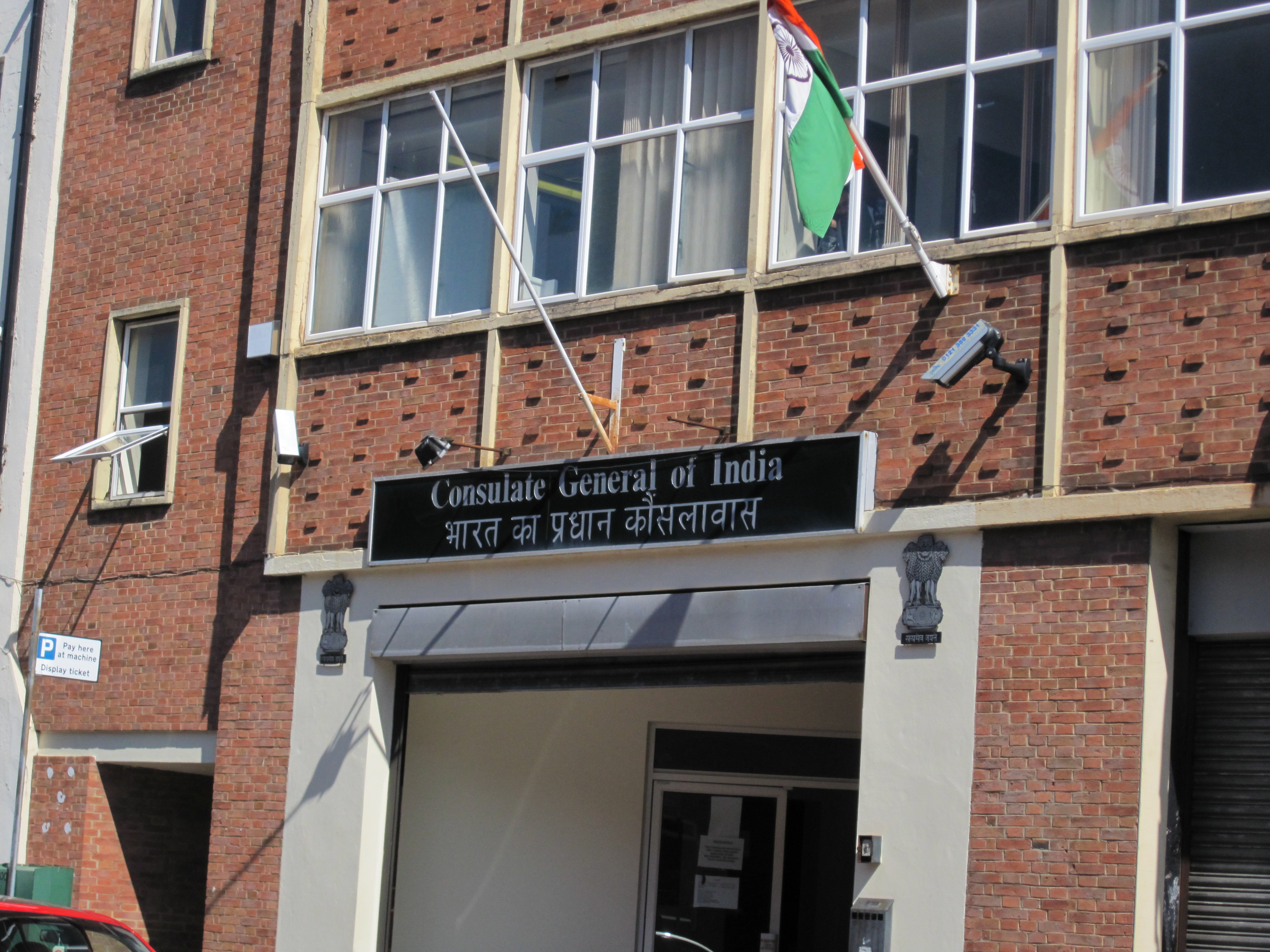
Consulate-General in Birmingham

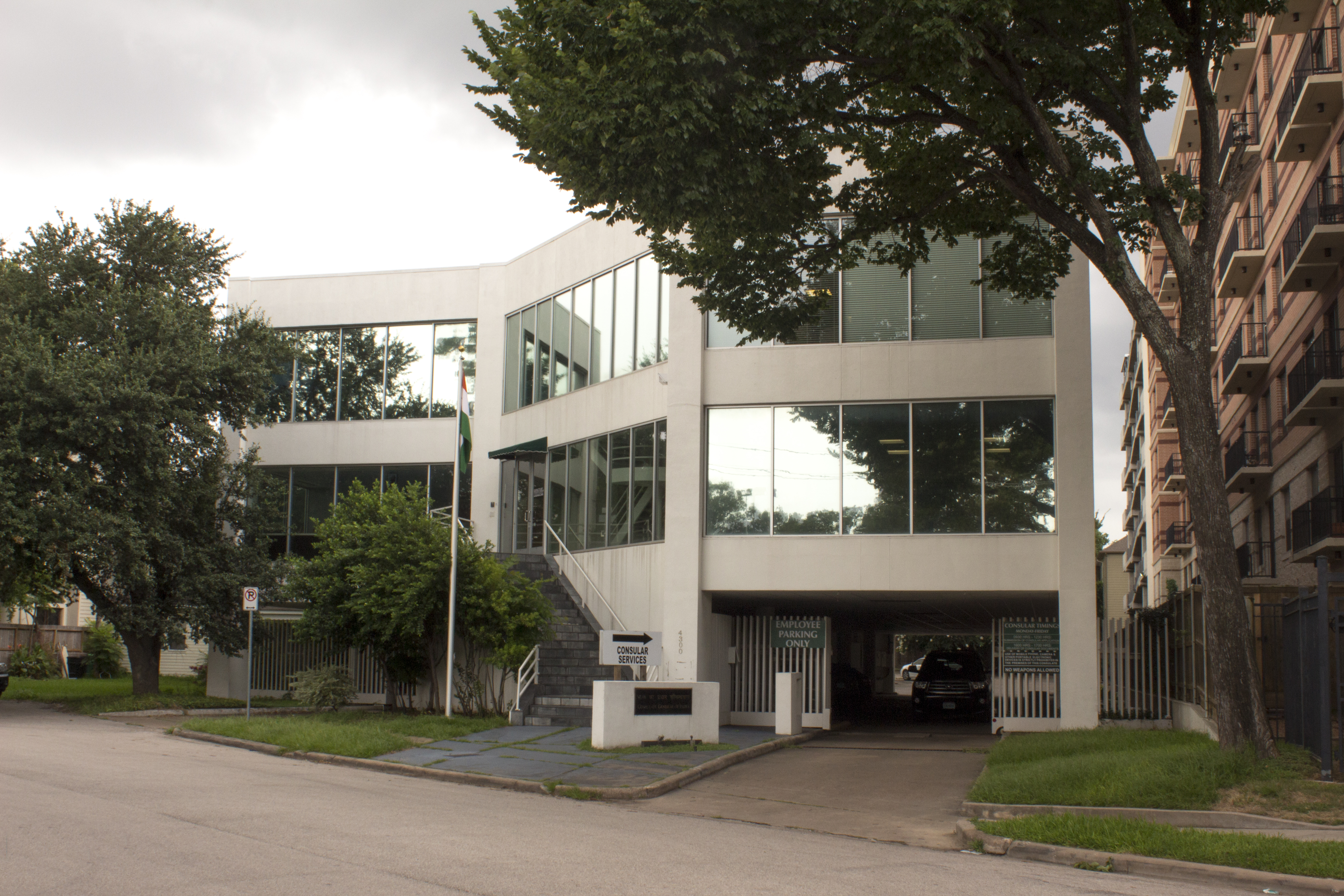
Consulate-General in Houston

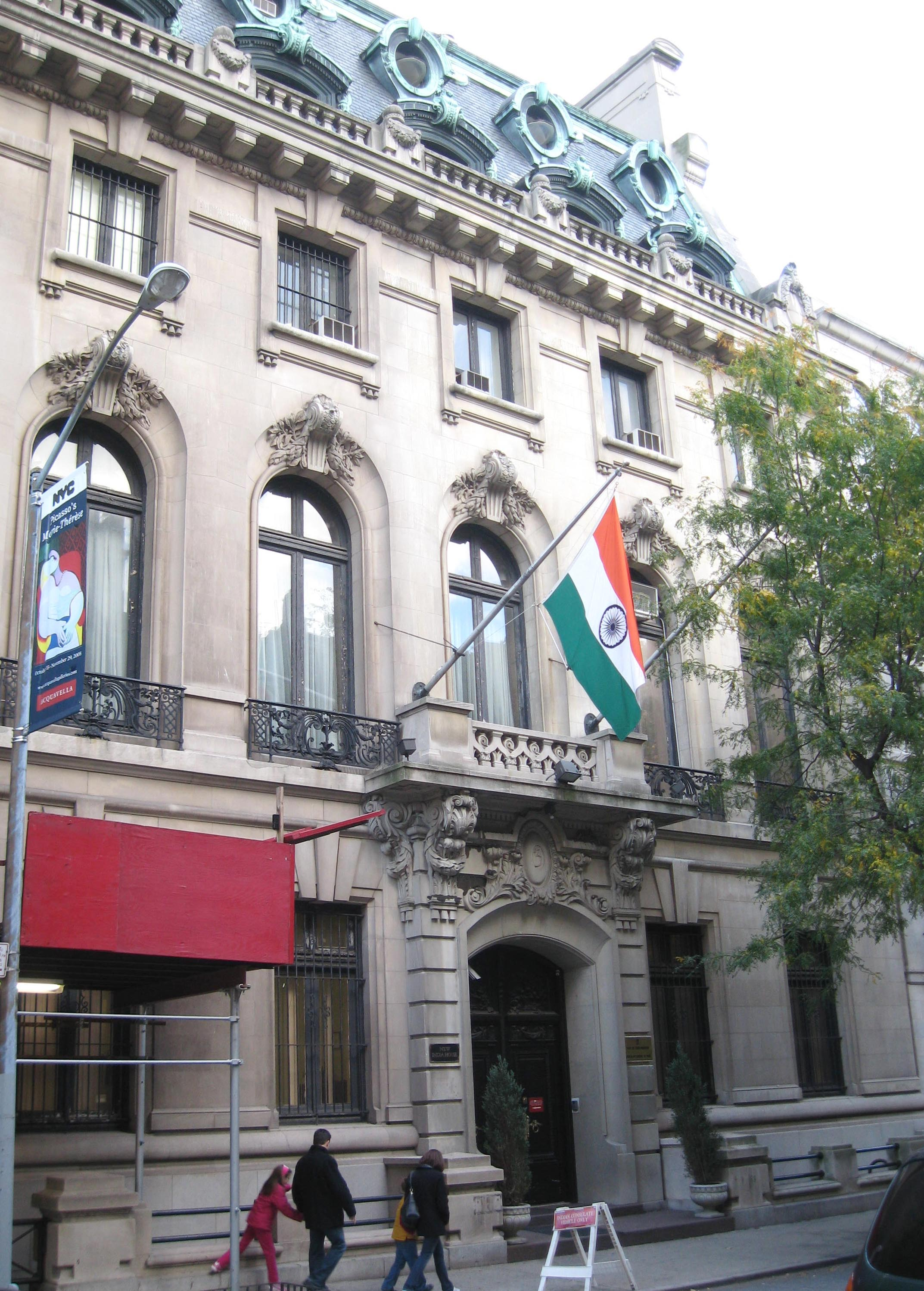
Consulate-General in New York City

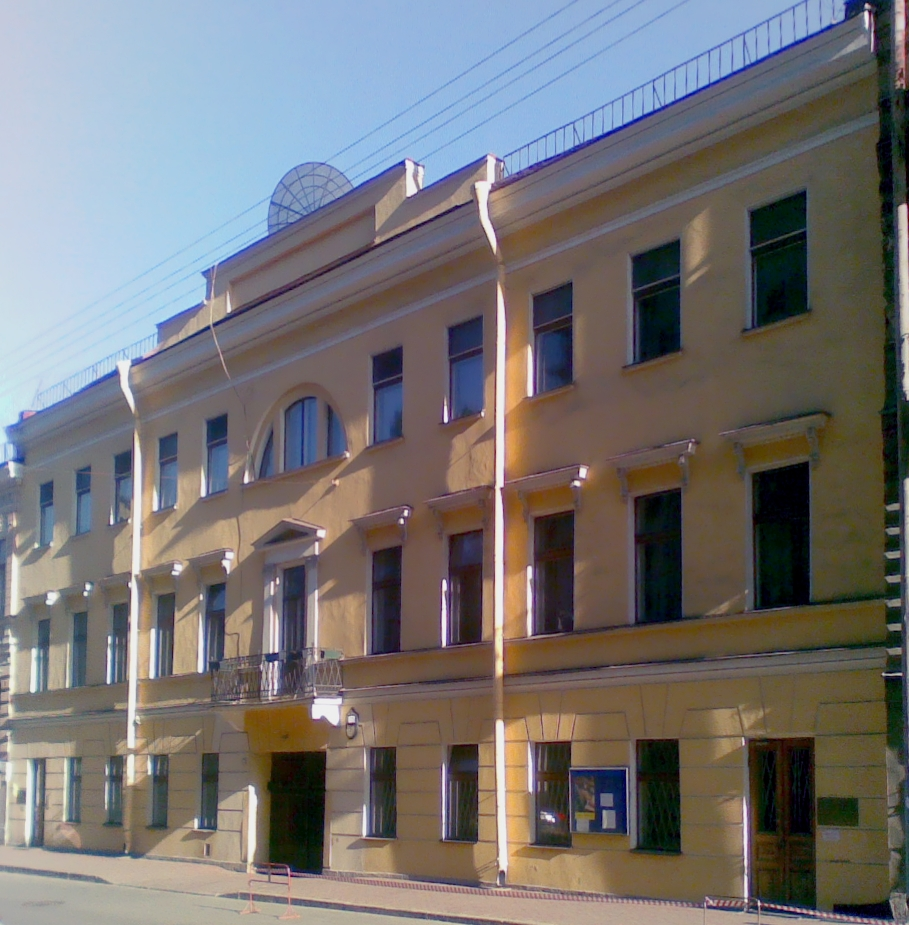
Consulate-General in Saint Petersburg

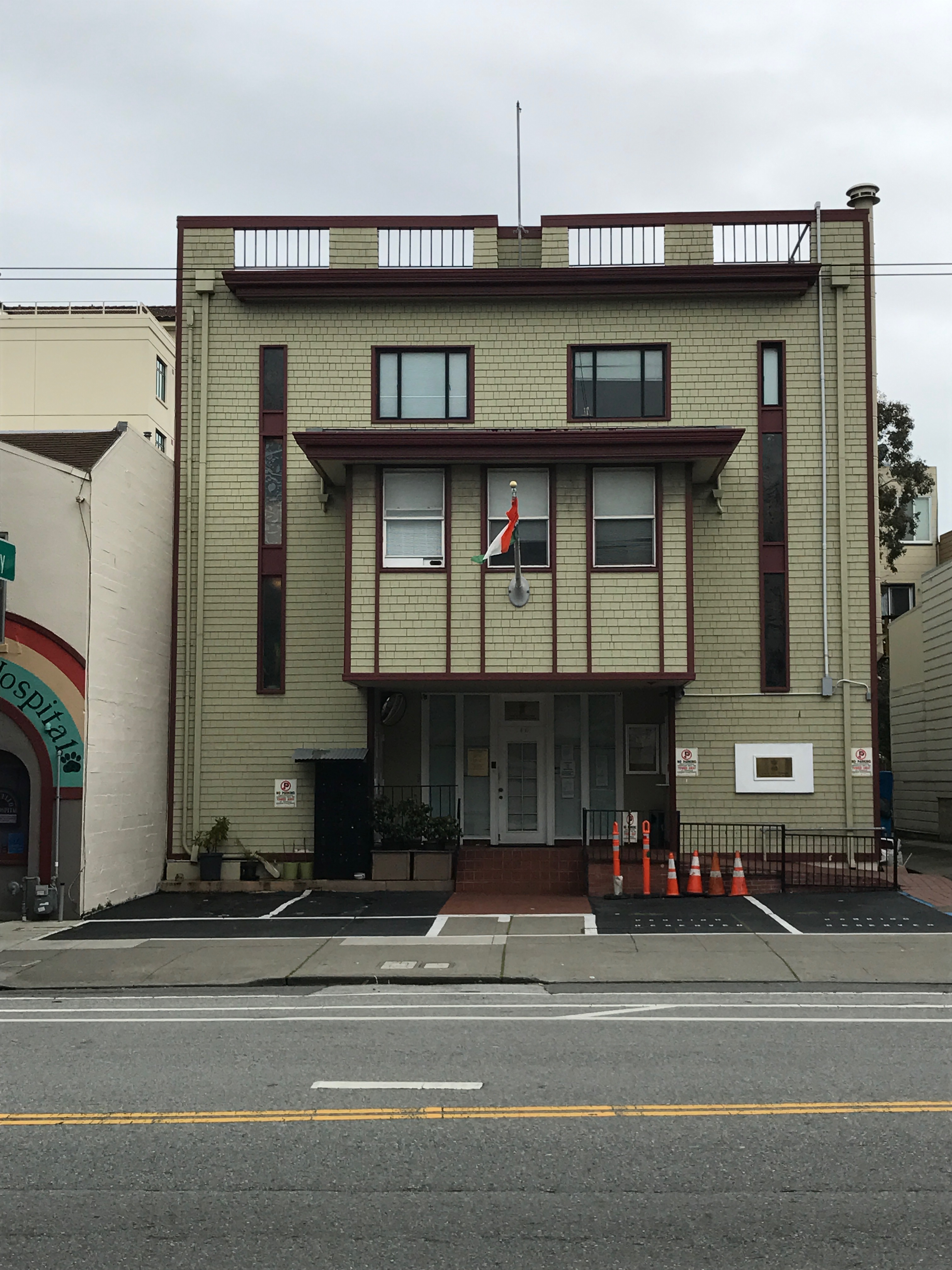
Consulate-General in San Francisco

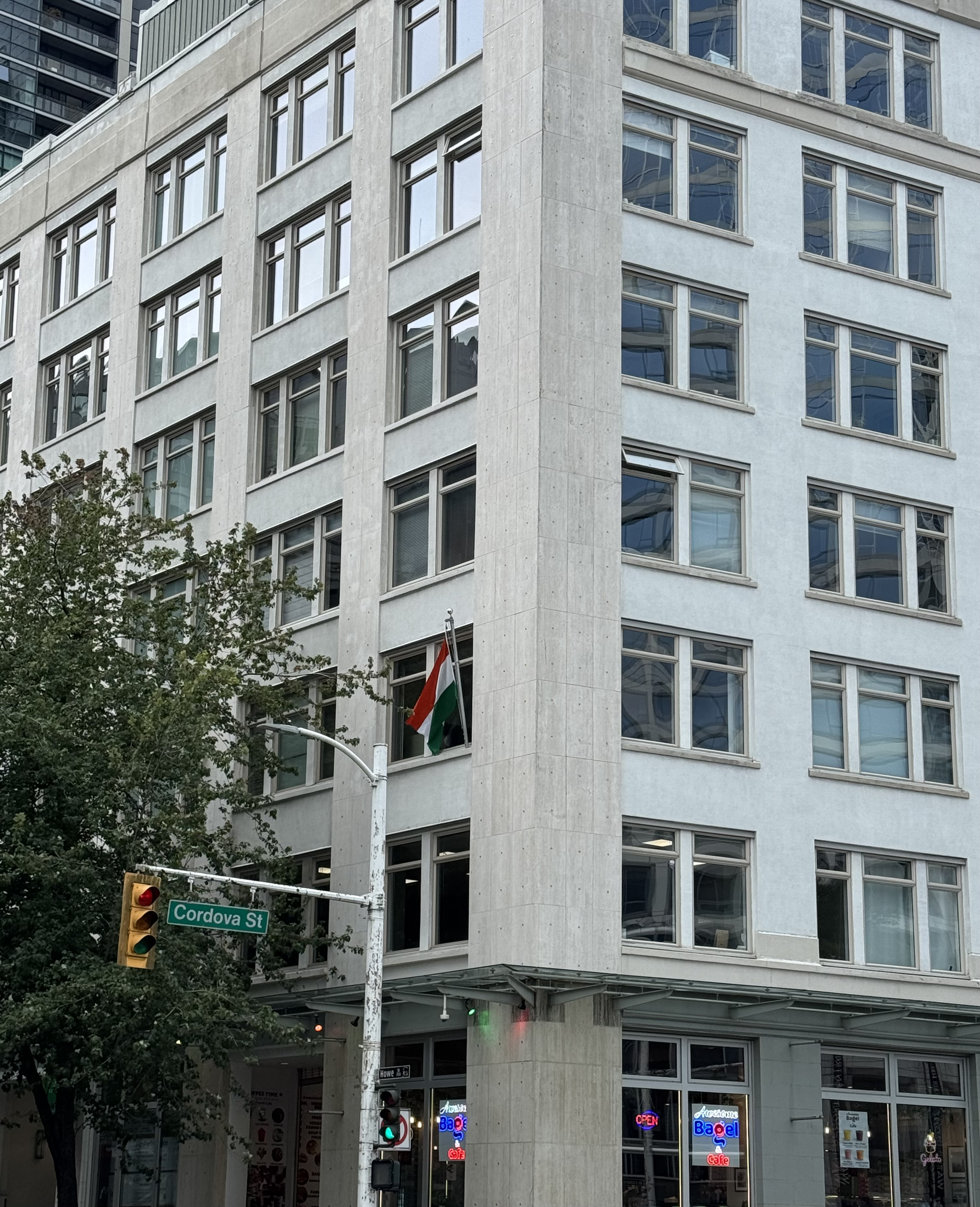
Consulate-General in Vancouver

Other missions

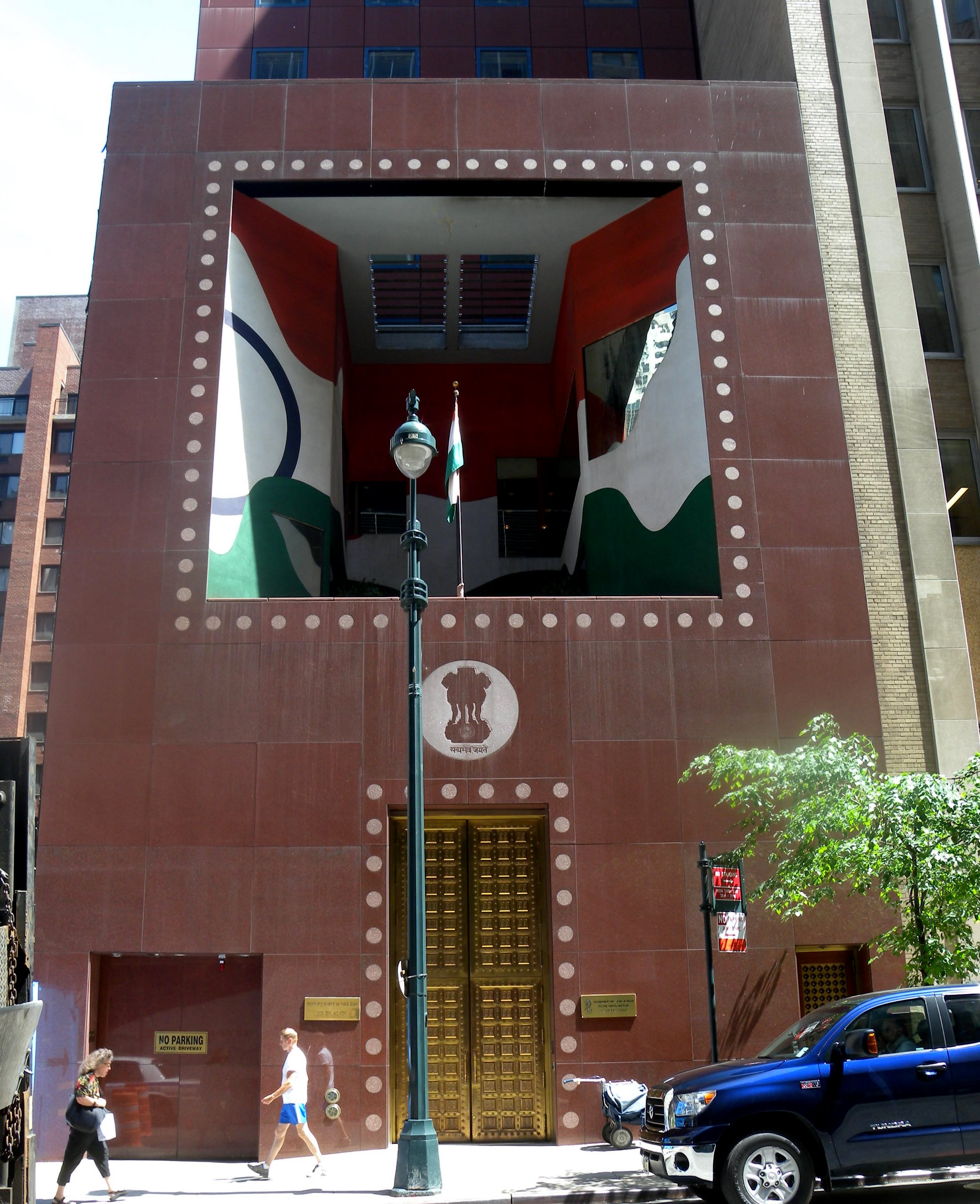
Permanent Mission to the United Nations in New York City

== Closed missions ==
=== Africa ===
Host country	Host city	Mission	Year closed	Ref.
Somalia	Mogadishu	Embassy (Note: Resident in Nairobi, Kenya)	1991	

=== Asia ===
Host country	Host city	Mission	Year closed	Ref.
Afghanistan (Note: All Indian missions in Afghanistan are officially under temporary suspension, in light of the fall of Kabul to the Taliban.)	Herat	Consulate-General	2020	
Afghanistan	Jalalabad	Consulate-General	2020	
Afghanistan	Kandahar	Consulate-General	2021	
Afghanistan	Mazar-i-Sharif	Consulate-General	2021	
China	Lhasa	Consulate-General	1962	
Pakistan	Abbottabad	Consulate-General	1982	
Pakistan	Karachi	Consulate-General	1994	
Yemen	Sana'a	Embassy (Note: Resident in Djibouti City, Djibouti)	2015	

=== Europe ===
Host country	Host city	Mission	Year closed	Ref.
Ukraine	Odesa	Consulate-General	1999	

== New Missions ==
This is a list of locations in which new resident missions have been formally announced but have not yet become fully operational:

- Rangpur, Bangladesh
- Addu City, Maldives
- Kota Kinabalu, Malaysia

== See also ==
- Foreign relations of India
- List of diplomatic missions in India
- List of ambassadors and high commissioners of India
- List of ambassadors and high commissioners to India
- Visa policy of India
- Visa requirements for Indian citizens
