= High Commission of India, Nicosia =

Diplomatic mission of India to Cyprus

- Address: Intiras Gkanti 3, Nicosia 2413, Cyprus
- Coordinates: 35.1609174°N 33.318895°E
- Jurisdiction: Cyprus
- High Commissioner: Mr. Manish
- Website: Official website

The High Commission of India in Nicosia is the diplomatic mission of India to Cyprus. The High Commissioner is Mr. Manish. India doesn't recognise Northern Cyprus, and instead uses its mission to cover the region in its jurisdiction.

== Activities and events ==
Various activities are organised as well. The embassy offers educational programs and scholarships for the diasporan community.

== See also ==
- Cyprus–India relations
- Foreign relations of Cyprus
- Foreign relations of India
- List of diplomatic missions in Cyprus
- List of diplomatic missions of India
