= Embassy of Turkey, New Delhi =

Diplomatic mission of Turkey to India

- Location: India
- Address: 50-N, Nyaya Marg; Chanakyapuri, New Delhi; Delhi 110021
- Ambassador: Fırat Sunel
- Jurisdiction: India; Bhutan; Nepal; Maldives
- Website: Official website

The Embassy of Turkey in New Delhi is the diplomatic mission of the Republic of Turkey to India. It is located in Chanakyapuri neighborhood of New Delhi.

The current ambassador is Fırat Sunel.

== History ==
The Embassy was established in 1948 to build India–Turkey relations. Turkey recognised India right after its declaration of independence on 15 August 1947 and diplomatic relations were established between the two countries. As Turkey was part of the Western Alliance and India of the Non-Aligned Movement during the Cold War era, the bilateral relations did not develop at a desired pace. However, since the end of the Cold War era, both sides put in effort in developing their bilateral relations in every field.

=== List of Ambassadors ===
- Ali Türkgeldi (7/8/1948 to 5/4/1951)
- Numan Tahir Seymen (3/21/1953 to 7/13/1955)
- Kadri Rızan (8/20/1957 to 11/1/1960)
- Necdet Kent (11/15/1960 to 8/20/1962)
- Seyfullah Esin (11/6/1962to 6/22/1965)
- Fikret Belbez (8/9/1965 to 12/7/1966)
- Osman Olcay (3/14/1967 to 1/10/1969)
- Mahmut Dikerdem (9/2/1969 to 1/9/1972)
- Gündoğdu Üstün (2/26/1972 to 9/30/1976)
- Oktay Işçen (10/4/1976 to 12/16/1979)
- Ali Hikmet Alp (2/26/1980 to 11/16/1983)
- İldeniz Divanlıoğlu (11/30/1983 to 5/23/1987)
- T. Yalım Eralp (6/4/1987 to 7/27/1991)
- Murat Sungar (11/1/1991 to 9/16/1995)
- Sami Cansel Onaran (11/26/1995 to 12/17/1997)
- Yusuf Buluç (1/6/1998 to 12/16/2001)
- Hasan Göğüş (12/31/2001 to 1/17/2006)
- Halil Akıncı (2/1/2006 to 4/30/2008)
- M. Levent Bilman (5/4/2008 to 2/4/2011)
- Burak Akçapar (8/5/2011 to 12/16/2016)
- Şakir Özkan Torunlar (1/17/2017 to 5/6/2021)
- Fırat Sunel (5/14/2021 - incumbent)

== Jurisdiction ==
Along with India, Embassy also serves Nepal, Maldives and Bhutan.

== Consulates ==
Embassy has

- Two Consulates in India (Mumbai and Hyderabad).
- Honorary Consulates in Nepal and Maldives.

== See also ==
- India–Turkey relations
- Foreign relations of Turkey
- List of diplomatic missions in India
- List of diplomatic missions of Turkey
