= Operation Dost =

Search and rescue operation by India

- Part of 2023 Turkey–Syria earthquakes
- Operational scope: Humanitarian relief
- Location: Turkey and Syria
- Planned by: Indian Armed Forces and Minister of External Affairs (India)
- Objective: Relief and rescue operations in Turkey and Syria
- Date: 6 February 2023
- Executed by: Indian Armed Forces, Indian Air Force, National Disaster Response Force

Operation Dost (Operation Friend) was the search and rescue operation initiated by the Government of India to aid Syria and Turkey, after the 2023 Turkey–Syria earthquakes devastated both countries on 6 February 2023. The epicenter was 37 km west of Gaziantep, Turkey.

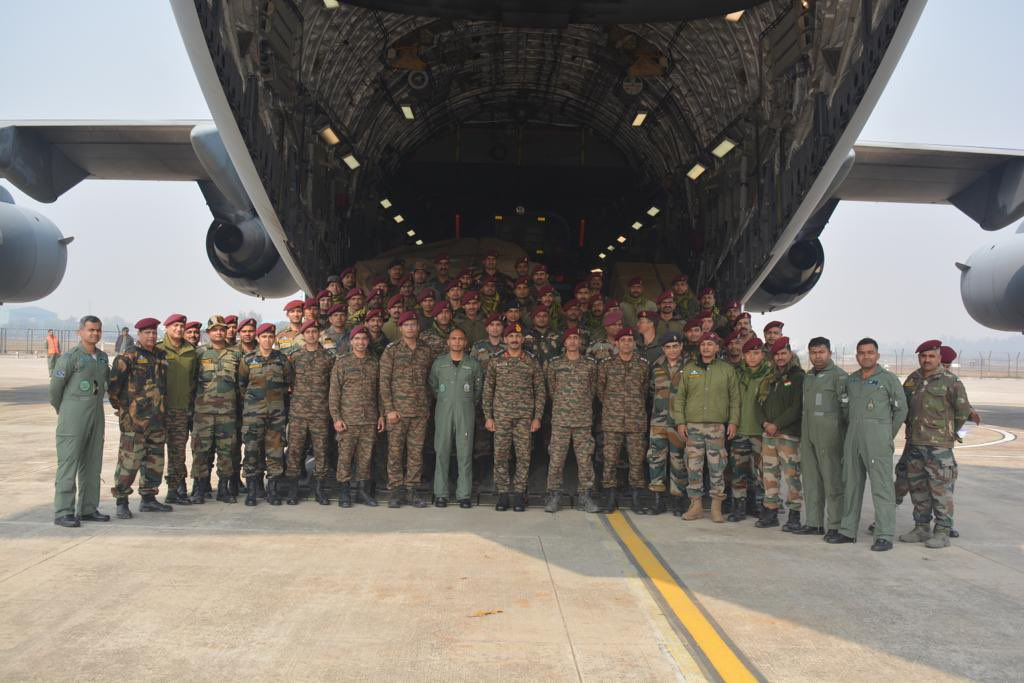
The Indian Army medical team before being airlifted to Turkey by the IAF, 7 February 2023.

== Etymology ==
'Dost' means 'friend' in both Hindi and Turkish.

== Responses ==
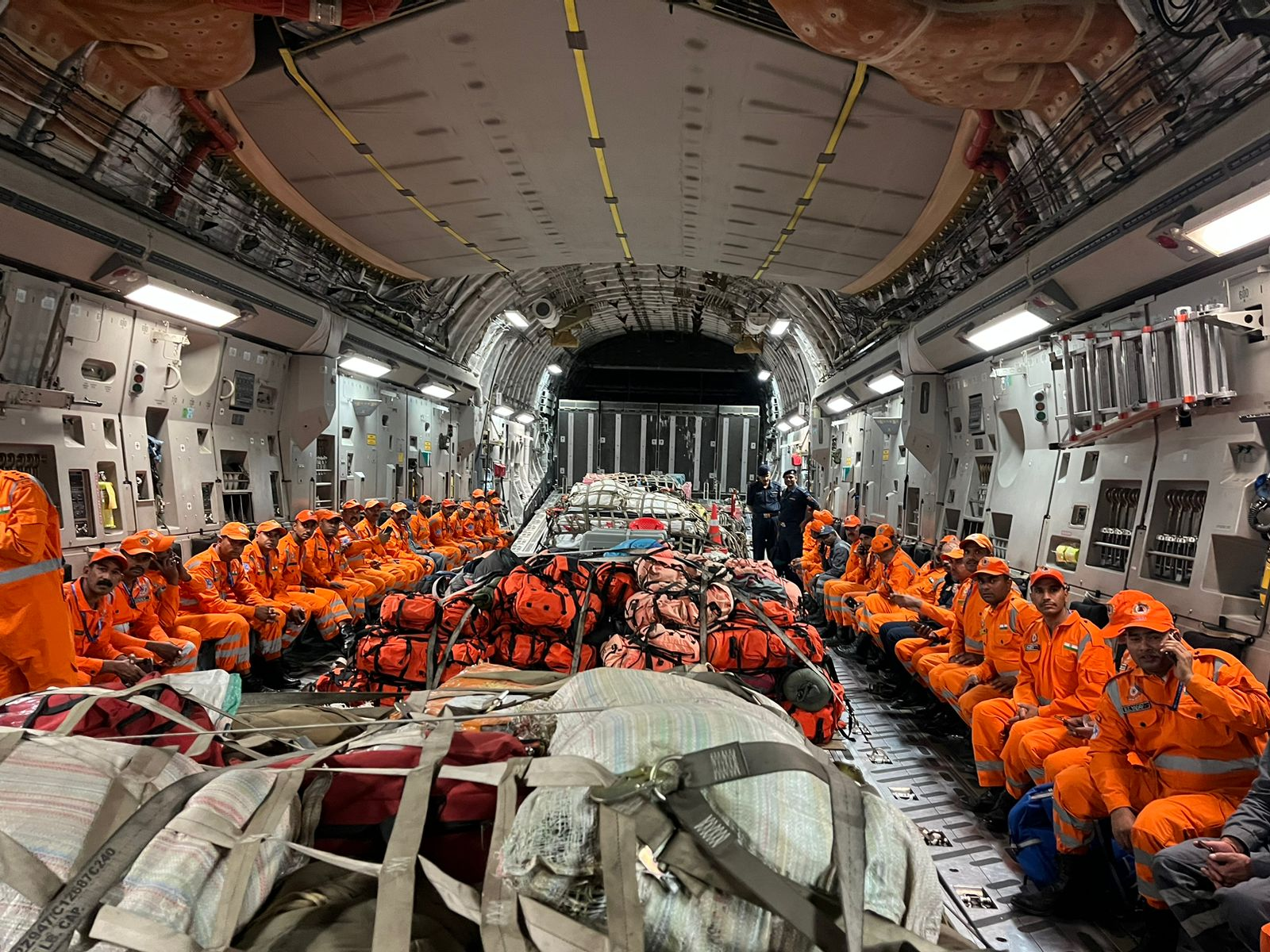
Flight carrying NDRF personnel, essential equipment, and relief materials

The morning of the earthquake, India's Prime Minister Narendra Modi expressed his grief and solidarity with Turkey, saying:

Anguished by the loss of lives and damage of property due to the earthquake in Turkey. Condolences to the bereaved families. May the injured recover soon. India stands in solidarity with the people of Turkey and is ready to offer all possible assistance to cope with this tragedy.

A few hours later, Modi sent additional condolences and offers of assistance to Syria:

Deeply pained to learn that the devastating earthquake has also affected Syria. My sincere condolences to the families of the victims. We share the grief of Syrian people and remain committed to provide assistance and support in this difficult time.

Prime Minister Modi's Principal Secretary P. K. Mishra held a meeting in the South Block of the Secretariat Building to determine what immediate relief measures would be offered to Turkey. In attendance were the cabinet secretary, the National Disaster Management Authority, the National Disaster Response Force (NDRF), and representatives of the ministries of Home Affairs, Defence, External Affairs, Civil Aviation, and Health and Family Welfare.

India's Minister of External Affairs S. Jaishankar shared condolences to Turkey and Syria. He named existing humanitarian efforts in Turkey and Syria after his meeting with Turkish envoy Firat Sunel.

Turkish Ambassador to India Firat Sunel thanked New Delhi for their assistance and support, adding "Dost kara günde belli olur (a friend in need is a friend indeed). Thank you very much India".

Turkish pro-government daily newspaper Daily Sabah praised India's efforts and help to Turkey.

== Operations ==
India has sent around ₹7 crore-worth (700,00,000 Rupee; 845,590 USD) of relief material to both Syria and Turkey. The Indian Army prepared its rescue teams with relief materials within 12 hours after disaster struck.

=== Turkey ===
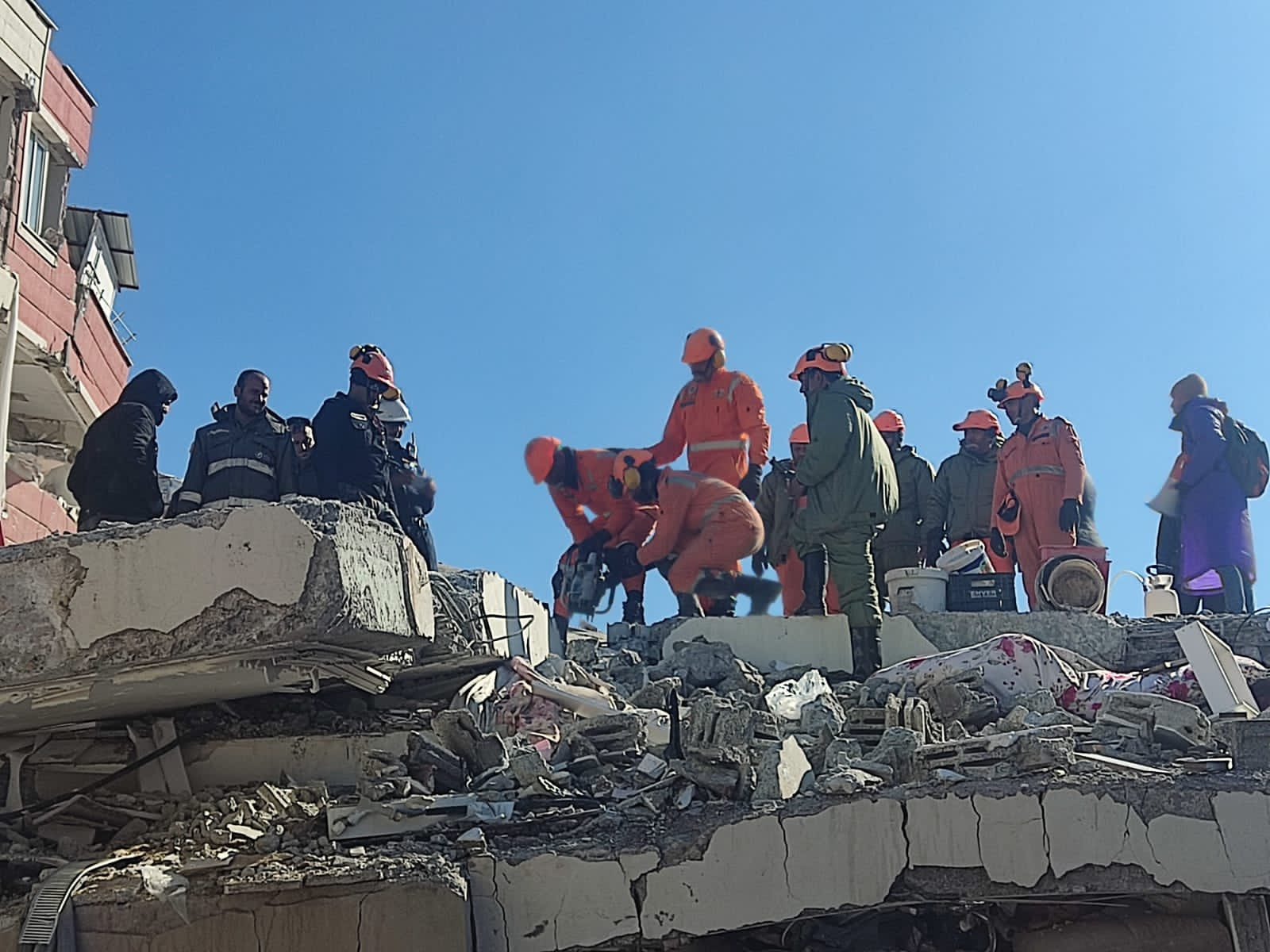
NDRF personnel performing search and rescue in Gaziantep, Turkey

India was among the first countries to help earthquake-hit Turkey, according to Turkish envoy Firat Sunel. India immediately sent NDRF squads for rescue operations in affected areas of Turkey on the evening of 6 February 2023. The Indian Air Force sent a C-17 to Adana with 47 personnel from the NDRF, 3 senior officers, and a specially trained dog squad. Accompanying personnel were necessary equipment, including medical supplies, drilling machines and other equipment required for the aid efforts.

India provided Garuda Aerospace's Droni drones to the most affected areas to identify those trapped under rubble, along with modified Kisan drones carrying medications, food, and supplies.

The NDRF teams possess chip and stone cutters- tools that break through concrete slabs and other building materials to free victims, as well as radar for detecting heartbeats.

On 7 February 2023, the Indian Air Force sent two more C-17 aircraft to Turkey. These two flights contained relief supplies, a mobile hospital, and additional specialized search-and-rescue teams. Along with NDRF personnel, the Agra-based Army Field Hospital dispatched 89 medical staff. The medical team includes both critical care specialists and general physicians, with access to X-ray machines, ventilators, an oxygen generation plant, cardiac monitors, and associated equipment to set up a 30 bedded medical facility.

As of 9 February 2023, India has sent a total of six C-17 aircraft.

The 7th flight from the IAF arrived at the Adana Airport in Turkey on 12 February 2023. This flight carried medical equipment like patient monitors, and ECG machines. It also carried disaster relief material and supplies for rescue teams on the ground.

In addition to the supplies delivered by aircraft, India is using a system known as "SANCHAR". Developed by Captain Karan Singh and Sub PG Sapre of the Indian Army, this network-independent tracking and messaging system can help track both team members and assets as they operate in earthquake-hit areas.

Indian Medical personnel team returned to India on 20 February 2023 after successfully built and ran field hospital in İskenderun.

=== Syria ===
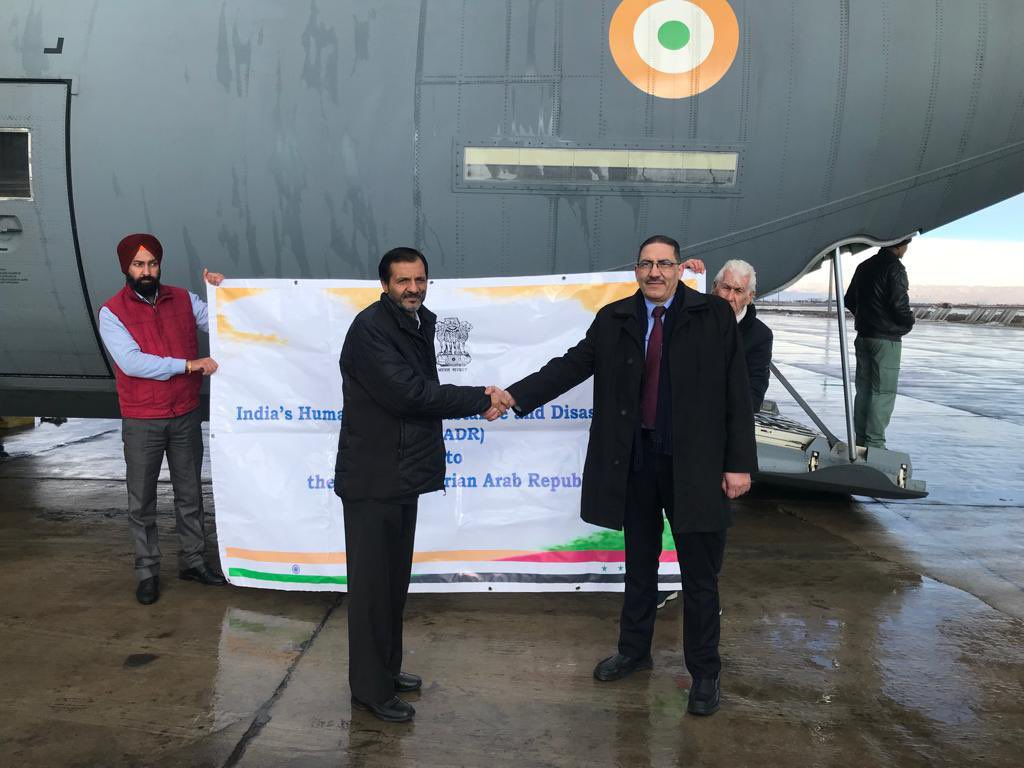
Chargé d'Affaires of India to Syria Shri S.K. Yadav (left) shakes hands with Deputy Minister of Local Administration & Environment Moutaz Douaji (right)

Despite concerns of aid not reaching Syria due to the current crisis and the subsequent sanctions, India has remained firm in its stance to assist those who need aid. Sanjay Verma, the Secretary (West) in the Ministry of External Affairs, said "I think what should be uppermost in the mind is the G20 mantra, 'One Earth, One Family, One Future' and in all of this, the present becomes a testing ground on how we as humans come together… sanctions don't cover such humanitarian challenges".

On 8 February 2023, over 6 tons of emergency relief assistance was received at the Damascus Airport by Deputy Minister of Local Administration & Environment Moutaz Douaji- included were 3 truck-loads of protective gear, emergency medications, ECG machines, and other medical supplies.

On 12 February 2023, the 7th IAF flight landed at the Damascus Airport in Syria and was received by Moutaz Douaji. It contained over 23 tons of relief material, including gensets, solar lamps, emergency & critical care medicines, & disaster relief consumables.

== See also ==
- Humanitarian response to the 2023 Turkey–Syria earthquakes
- Operation Maitri – similar mission by the Indian government in Nepal during the April 2015 Nepal earthquake
- Operation Brahma – similar mission by the Indian government in Myanmar during the 2025 Myanmar earthquake
- India–Turkey relations
- India–Syria relations
