= Mathrubhumi International Festival of Letters =

Indian annual literary festival

Mathrubhumi International Festival of Letters MBIFL
- Genre: Literary festival
- Frequency: Annual
- Locations: Kanakakkunnu Palace, Thiruvananthapuram, Kerala, India
- Country: India
- Years active: 8
- Inaugurated: February 2, 2018; 8 years ago
- Most recent: February 6 – February 9, 2025
- Next event: January 29 – February 1, 2026
- Major events: Panel discussion; Keynote; Interview; Poetry reading; Book reading; Book signing; Training workshop
- Organiser: Mathrubhumi
- Website: www.mbifl.com

The Mathrubhumi International Festival of Letters or MBIFL, started in 2018, is an annual literature event held at the Kanakakkunnu Palace in Thiruvananthapuram, Kerala, India.

This festival brings together a diverse array of speakers from multiple fields, including well-known writers and authors, influencers and celebrities, politicians, and sports personalities. The last edition of MBIFL was held from February 6 to February 9, 2025.

The next edition of the festival is scheduled for January 29 – February 1, 2026. The theme of the 2026 edition of MBIFL is "Paradox of Pace".

== History and organisation ==
=== Founding ===
MBIFL was conceptualised and started in 2018 by the Mathrubhumi group.

Year	Edition	Dates	Theme
2025	Edition 6	Feb 6–9	Currents Of Change
2024	Edition 5	Feb 8–11	Exploring Plurality
2023	Edition 4	Feb 2–5	Shadows of history, Lights of the future
2020	Edition 3	Jan 30 – Feb 2	Shrinking Spaces, Transcending Letters
2019	Edition 2	Jan 31 – Feb 3	Known Lands; Unheard Voices
2018	Edition 1	Feb 2–4	For the Love of Literature

2025 edition

The sixth edition of the Mathrubhumi International Festival of Letters (MBIFL) was held from February 6 to 9, 2025, and centered around the theme "Currents of Change". The theme addresses contemporary social, cultural, economic, and technological developments.

MBIFL 2025 included writers, scholars, and public figures from India and abroad. Speakers at the festival included Malgorzata Czyzewski, Tomica Scavina, Pramudith D. Rupasinghe, Urszula Honek, Yuliya Musakova, Yuriy Serebriansky, former cricketers Syed Kirmani, Mohinder Amarnath, and Rajender Amarnath, Former Minister Mani Shankar Aiyar, Director C Premkumar, as well as film critic Anupama Chopra alongside other participants from various fields.

=== 2024 edition ===
The fifth edition of the Mathrubhumi International Festival of Letters (MBIFL) centered around the theme "Exploring Plurality." The festival aimed to explore the promise of plurality by connecting diverse perspectives, cultures, and identities. Held from February 8 to 11, MBIFL 2024 featured an lineup of writers and thinkers from around the globe, including several prominent international and national speakers such as Francesc Miralles, Mansoura Ez-Eldin, Fırat Sunel, Subhashini Ali, Sakshi Malik, and Ramachandra Guha.

=== 2023 edition ===
The fourth edition of the Mathrubhumi International Festival of Letters (MBIFL) was on the theme "Shadows of History, Lights of the Future", and it coincided with the centenary celebrations of Mathrubhumi.

Held from February 2 to 5, 2023, the event featured speakers from around the world, including Nobel Prize winner Abdulrazak Gurnah, Booker Prize winner Shehan Karunatilaka, and Man Booker International Prize winner Jokha Alharthi, among other prominent voices.

=== 2020 edition ===
The third edition of the festival took place from January 30 to February 2, 2020, under the theme "Shrinking Spaces, Transcending Letters." The festival sought to identify and celebrate the intellectual efforts to resist the ongoing challenges to democratic discourse while elevating the role of letters – an enduring inspiration for literature across cultures and civilizations. More than 350 speakers, including Lemn Sissay, Margaret Busby, Dean Atta, and Alexander McCall Smith, participated in this edition.

In 2020, the inaugural "Book of the Year" award was presented to Blue is Like Blue by Vinod Kumar Shukla, translated into English by Arvind Krishna Mehrotra and Sara Rai.

=== 2019 edition ===
The second edition of the Mathrubhumi International Festival of Letters (MBIFL), centred on the theme 'Known Lands; Unheard Voices', was held from January 31 to February 3.

The festival had speakers from Europe, the US, the West Indies, Africa, Latin America and the Middle East. MBIFL '19 had a large contingent of close to 50 foreign speakers including poets, novelists, graphic novelists, filmmakers and journalists. There were more than 100 speakers from Kerala in addition to the well-known Indian writers in English and other languages.

=== 2018 edition ===
The first edition of the Mathrubhumi International Festival of Letters (MBIFL) was held at the Kanakakkunnu Palace, February 2–4, 2018, on the theme "For the Love of Literature".

The three-day event brought together more than 100 international and Indian writers, speakers, and performers. It tapped into Kerala's young and emerging talent, allowing aspiring writers to engage with literary masters.

Writers and speakers from more than 10 countries participated, offering high-profile conversations, choreographed reading sessions, augmented reality experiences, impromptu performances, and workshops by noted photojournalist Raghu Rai. The festival also explored traditional Kerala cuisine and celebrated the region's syncretic culture, continuing the legacy of literature and its significance.

=== MBIFL Book of the Year ===
Year	Title	Author	Remarks
2020	Blue is Like Blue	Vinod Kumar Shukla	translated from English by Arvind Krishna Mehrotra and Sara Rai
2023	Wanderers, Kings and Merchants	Peggy Mohan	
2024	Quarterlife	Devika Rege	
2025	Maria, Just Maria	Sandhya Mary, Jayasree Kalathil	
