= India–Turkey relations =

- India: Turkey

Diplomatic mission
- Embassy of India, Ankara: Embassy of Turkey, New Delhi

Envoy
- Indian Ambassador to Turkey Shri Muktesh Pardeshi: Turkish Ambassador to India Ali Murat Ersoy

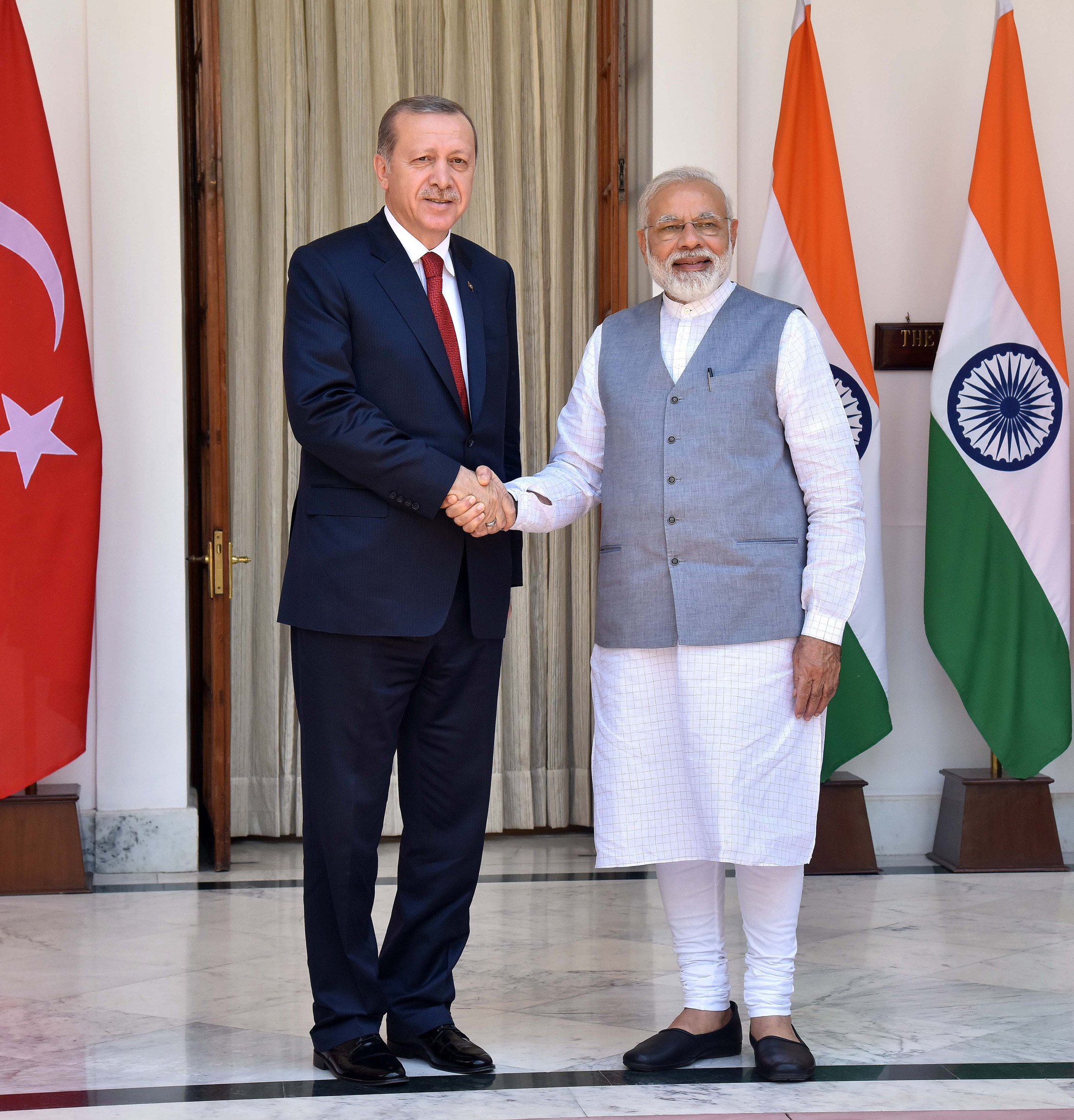
Prime Minister Narendra Modi with Turkish President Recep Tayyip Erdoğan at Hyderabad House, New Delhi, 1 May 2017

India–Turkey relations, also known as the Indo-Turkish relations, are the bilateral relations between the Republic of India and the Republic of Türkiye. Since the establishment of diplomatic relations between India and Turkey in 1948, political and bilateral relations have been usually characterized by warmth and cordiality, although some sporadic tensions remain due to Turkey's support for Pakistani stand on Kashmir and India's support for Armenia, Greece, and Cyprus in return. India has an embassy in Ankara and a consulate–general in Istanbul. Turkey has an embassy in New Delhi and consulate-generals in Mumbai, Kolkata, and Hyderabad. As of 2019, the bilateral trade between India and Turkey stood at US$7.8 billion.

== History ==
Economic and cultural relations between ancient India and Anatolia date back to the Vedic age (before 1500 BCE).

In the Second Persian invasion of Greece, Indians were employed in the Achaemenid army of Xerxes. All troops were stationed in Sardis, Lydia, during the winter of 481–480 BCE to prepare for the invasion. In the spring of 480 BCE "Indian troops marched with Xerxes's army across the Hellespont".

In 1212, the Seljuk Sultanate of Rum was gifted a colony in Koothanallur from the Chola Emperor of Tamilakam. The first exchange of diplomatic missions between the Ottoman Sultans and the Muslim rulers of the sub-continent dates back to the years 1481–82. Ottoman expeditions to the sultanates of Gujarat, Bijapur, and Ahmednagar were motivated by mutual anti-Portuguese sentiment; Ottoman artillery contributed to the fall of the pro-Portuguese Vijayanagara Empire. Turkish-Indian relations soured when the Mughals conquered most of India, since the Mughal Empire was a symbolic threat to the Ottoman Empire's position as the universal caliphate, despite contemplation for a Mughal–Ottoman–Uzbek alliance against Iran. After the Mughal Empire collapsed, Muslim rulers of Mysore like Tipu Sultan sought Ottoman aid in driving out the British, but the Ottomans were weakened by wars with Russia and in no position to help.

From the 15th to the 19th century, Indian Dervishes came to the Ottoman Empire and built Tekke, the so-called Hintli Tekkeler. Their names are recorded in the Ottoman archives. Their descendants are called "Hindis", especially in Istanbul where they have settled.

More recently, the connection was increasingly fostered in the 19th and 20th centuries due to interactions between the two countries. In 1912–1913, during the First Balkan War, Indian Muslim men in the Red Crescent Society of India cared for wounded Ottoman soldiers. They were led by Mukhtar Ahmed Ansari and Abdur Rahman Peshawari. During World War I, the British Raj played a pivotal role in the successful Allied campaign against the Ottoman Empire. In the 1920s, India extended support to Turkey's War of Independence and the formation of the Turkish republic. Mahatma Gandhi took a stand against the injustices inflicted on Turkey at the end of World War I.

Turkey recognised India after the Indian Independence Act 1947, and diplomatic relations were established between the two countries. During the Cold War, Turkey was part of the Western Bloc and India was part of the Non-Aligned Movement. Since the end of the Cold War, both sides have worked to develop their relations.

== Issues ==
Relations between India and Turkey have been strained due to Turkey's continued support for Pakistani stand on the Kashmir dispute. Turkey was also the only opponent to India's inclusion into the Nuclear Suppliers Group other than China.

On Afghanistan, Turkey had taken the lead in 2011 to begin the Istanbul Process to find meaningful and sustainable solutions to Afghanistan's problems. The Istanbul Process culminated in the annual "Heart of Asia" regional conference on Afghanistan held in Kazakhstan's former capital, Almaty, with both India and Turkey playing important roles. In the context of the planned 2014 withdrawal of NATO and US troops from Afghanistan, the need for Delhi and Ankara to intensify dialogue over Afghanistan has acquired a particular importance.

=== 2019 ===
In September 2019, Turkey had criticized India on the issue of Jammu and Kashmir and the revocation of article 370. It made vocal comments against India at the United Nations, publicly favouring the position of Pakistan. A diplomatic rift emerged, and in return India condemned Turkey for its military offensive into north-eastern Syria, claiming it would undermine regional stability and the fight against terrorism. India also called upon Turkey to exercise restraint and respect the sovereignty and territorial integrity of Syria. On 24 December 2020, Turkish authorities shut down a website which according to Pakistani officials, was operated by India and used for propaganda against Pakistan. However, Turkey has repeatedly condemned attacks on Indian forces by Naxalites during the Naxalite–Maoist insurgency, which India has claimed have links to groups involved in the Maoist insurgency in Turkey.

=== 2025 ===
In May 2025, a diplomatic rift between India and Turkey erupted after Operation Sindoor, in which Turkey reportedly supplied over 350 drones and 2 military operatives to Pakistan during its conflict with India, sparking public outrage across India. In response, Indian citizens, celebrities, and businesses launched widespread economic boycotts, especially targeting tourism-major travel platforms that reported a 60% drop in bookings to Turkey and a 250% surge in cancellations, while industry bodies such as the Travel Agents Association of India ceased promoting Turkish destinations. This backlash strained broader economic and diplomatic ties, with Indian traders shunning Turkish goods and universities like Jawaharlal Nehru University suspending academic partnerships. However, contrary to what Indian media outlets claimed, Indians made up for less than 1% of Turkey's foreign visitors, a small share.

Amid the tensions, the protocol division of India's Ministry of External Affairs (MEA) postponed the credentials ceremony for the newly appointed Turkish ambassador to India which was scheduled for 15 May 2025. The MEA announced that the ceremony had been deferred citing "scheduling issues." Additionally, India revoked security clearance for the Turkish firm Çelebi Aviation Holding. India’s aviation regulator, the Bureau of Civil Aviation Security (BCAS), suspended Çelebi’s security clearance indefinitely on 15 May, citing safety concerns over its presence in secure airside areas. The revocation erased nearly $200 million in shareholder value and slashed a third of the Turkish company’s global revenue. Shares of Çelebi Hava Servisi AS plunged 20% over two trading sessions, dropping 222 points to 2,002 lira on 16 May.

Contrary to the sporadic tensions between both countries, economic ties continued to grow. India has a trade surplus over Turkey that benefits India more than Turkey. Ideologically, both countries share many similarities with conservative-populist governments. Both India and Turkey has cordial ties with Trump administration, the Gulf countries, and Russia; and both countries continues to face terrorism within their borders. In addition, Turkey has shown interest to join BRICS; Turkey will need approval from India to officially join. India has asked both China and Turkey to use their influence on Pakistan to end the latter's support for cross-border terrorism in Indian soil.

In October, India did not attend the Turkish Republic Day celebrations hosted by the Turkish Embassy in New Delhi. The decision was reportedly influenced by Ankara’s support for Pakistan during the May Conflict.

In November, Boeing had to reportedly work out a new alternative supply route after Turkey tried to block the supply of Apache helicopters to India by refusing to allow the cargo aircraft transporting the helicopters through its airspace.

== Trade relations ==
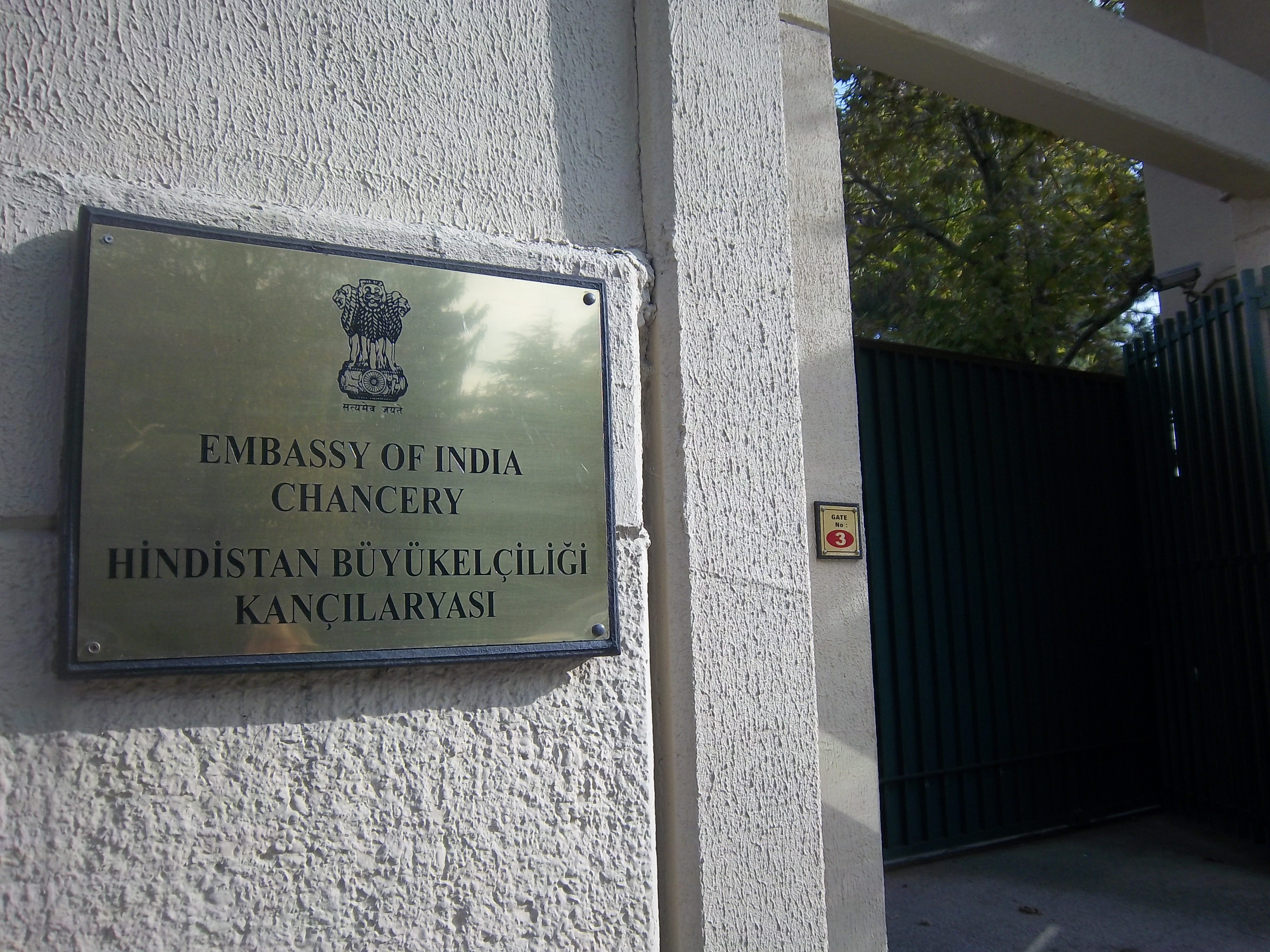
Entrance plate at Embassy of India in Ankara

Turkey’s economic reliance on India is relatively limited but significant in certain sectors. India’s bilateral trade with Turkey in financial year (FY) 2023–24 stood at $10.43 billion, with India’s exports to the country was at $6.65 billion and import at $3.78 billion. In the FY2024–25, Turkey exported goods worth $2.84 billion to India-mainly marble, gold, apples, and mineral oil-making up about 0.5% of India’s total imports, while India exported $5.2 billion to Turkey, accounting for roughly 1.5% of India’s total exports. As of 2025, India maintains a trade surplus with Turkey but Turkish exports to India have declined by over 17% due to recent diplomatic tensions. India's overall merchandise trade with Turkey contracted to nearly 63% in FY2024–25 from FY2022–23 levels, from a positive trade balance of $5,400.85 million in FY22–23 to $2,721.9 million in FY24–25.

On 18 March 2012, Burak Akçapar, Ambassador of the Republic of Turkey in India, announced that Turkey sought to double flights from India and open four more connecting points. Other destinations considered are Hyderabad, Chennai, Kolkata, and Bengaluru. At present, Turkish Airlines operates daily flights from Mumbai and New Delhi to Istanbul. A joint study on a free trade area was conducted, but is yet to be signed. He also announced that consulates in Chennai and Hyderabad, in South India, are planned to be started, as permission had been gained from the Indian government.

=== Investments ===
More than 150 companies with Indian capital have registered businesses in Turkey in the form of joint-ventures, trade and representative offices. These include M/s Polyplex, GMR Infrastructure, TATA Motors, Mahindra & Mahindra, Reliance, Ispat, Aditya Birla Group, Tractors and Farm Equipment Ltd, Jain Irrigation, Wipro, Sequent Scientific, and Dabur. Turkey ranks 41st overall in terms of FDI inflows to India. Cumulative Turkish direct investment into India amounts to US$87.18 million (April 2000 – April 2014).

India's GMR Group is one of the main stakeholders in the new Sabiha Gökçen International Airport in Istanbul.

Both the countries are members of the G20 group of major economies, where the two countries have closely cooperated on the management of the world economy. Bilateral trade in July 2012 stood at US$7.5 billion, a figure that is expected to double to US$15 billion by 2015.

== Cooperation in space technology ==
On 23 September 2009, a PSLV C-14 rocket from the Indian Space Research Organisation launched Turkey's first nanosatellite, ITUpSAT1.

== Defence cooperation ==
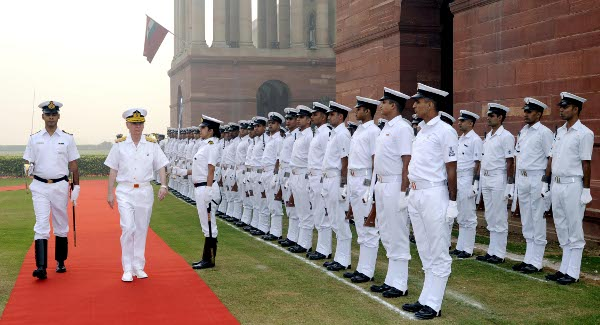
Admiral E Murat Bilgel, Commander of the Turkish Naval Forces, accorded with a guard of honour by the Indian Navy at South Block lawn, New Delhi.

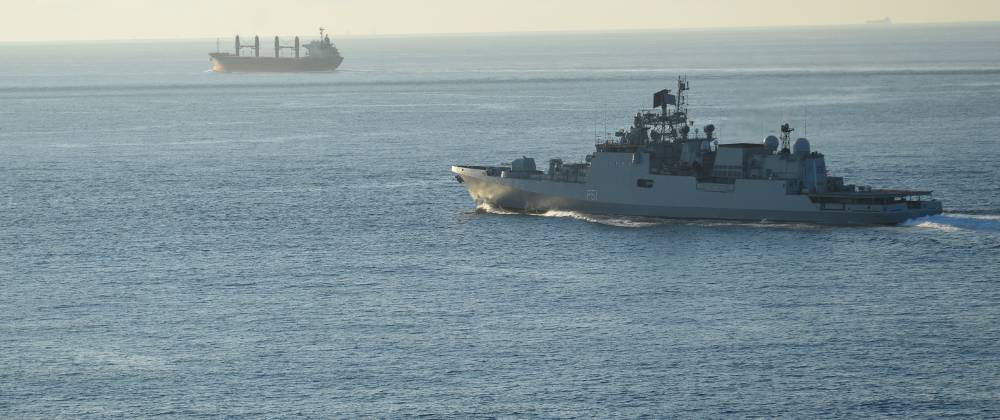
INS Trikand entering Istanbul, Turkey; 4 October 2015.

During the visit of Prime Minister Turgut Ozal to India in 1986, it was agreed that the two embassies will house Defence Attaché office. During the visit of Prime Minister Vajpayee in September 2003, it was decided that Defence Ministers of both countries should remain in closer touch. India conveyed its willingness to expand military to military contacts, and mutual exchange of delegations to training facilities. During the visit of the Turkish Prime Minister Erdoğan to India in November 2008, both prime ministers agreed to enhance cooperation between the two defence forces. As far as the military exercises between India and Turkey is concerned, there has been a regular but a low profile passage exercises (PASSEX) between the Navies of the two countries.

== See also ==
- Indians in Turkey
- Turkic peoples in India
- Foreign relations of India
- Foreign relations of Turkey
- Operation Dost
- Khilafat Movement

== Other sources ==
- Mehmet Ozkan, Can the Rise of 'New' Turkey Lead to a 'New' Era in India-Turkey Relations?, IDSA Issue Brief, September 2010 (PDF).
