= Kanakakkunnu Palace =

Historical building in India

Coordinates: 8.510663°N 76.958123°E

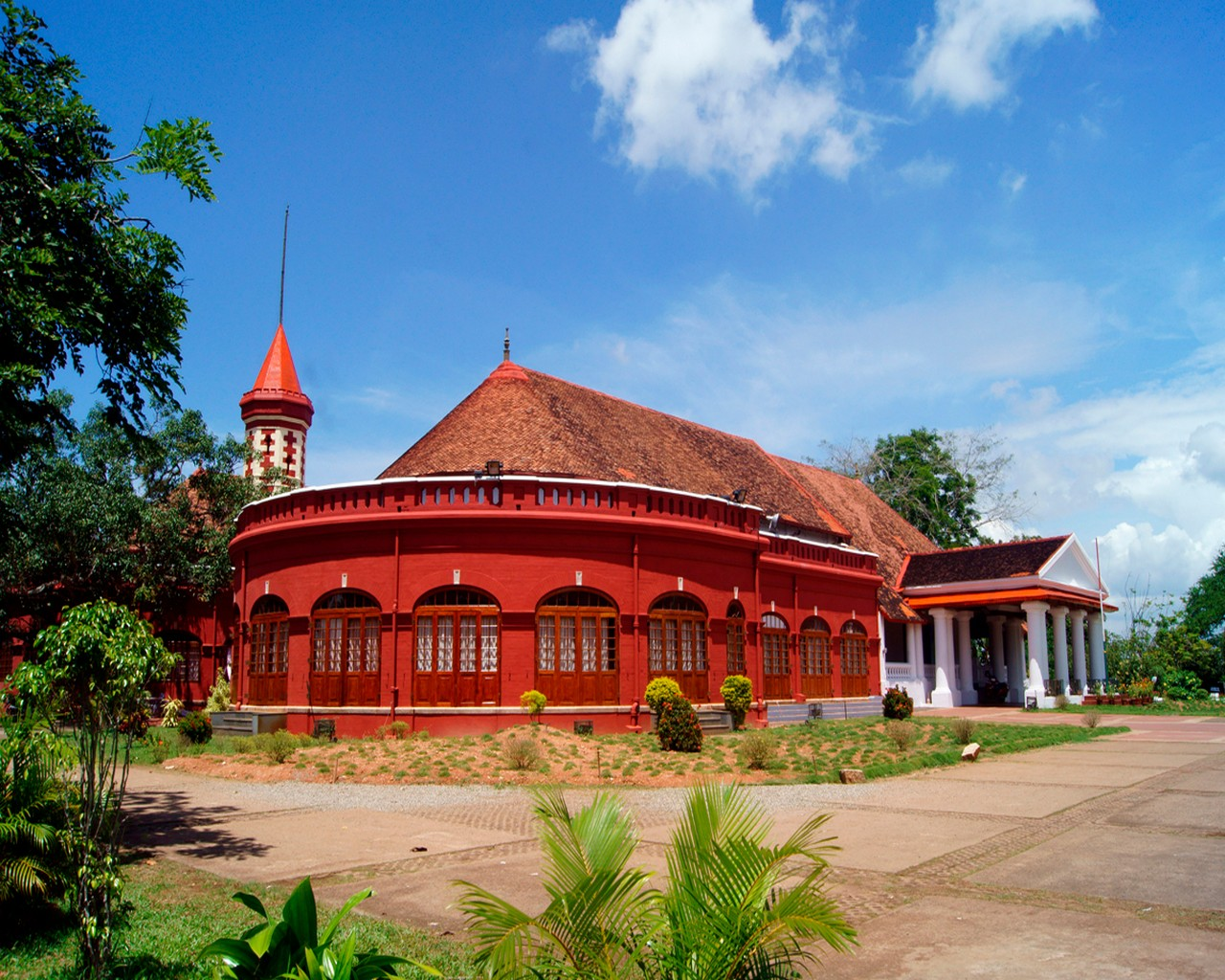
The Kanakakkunnu palace in Trivandrum

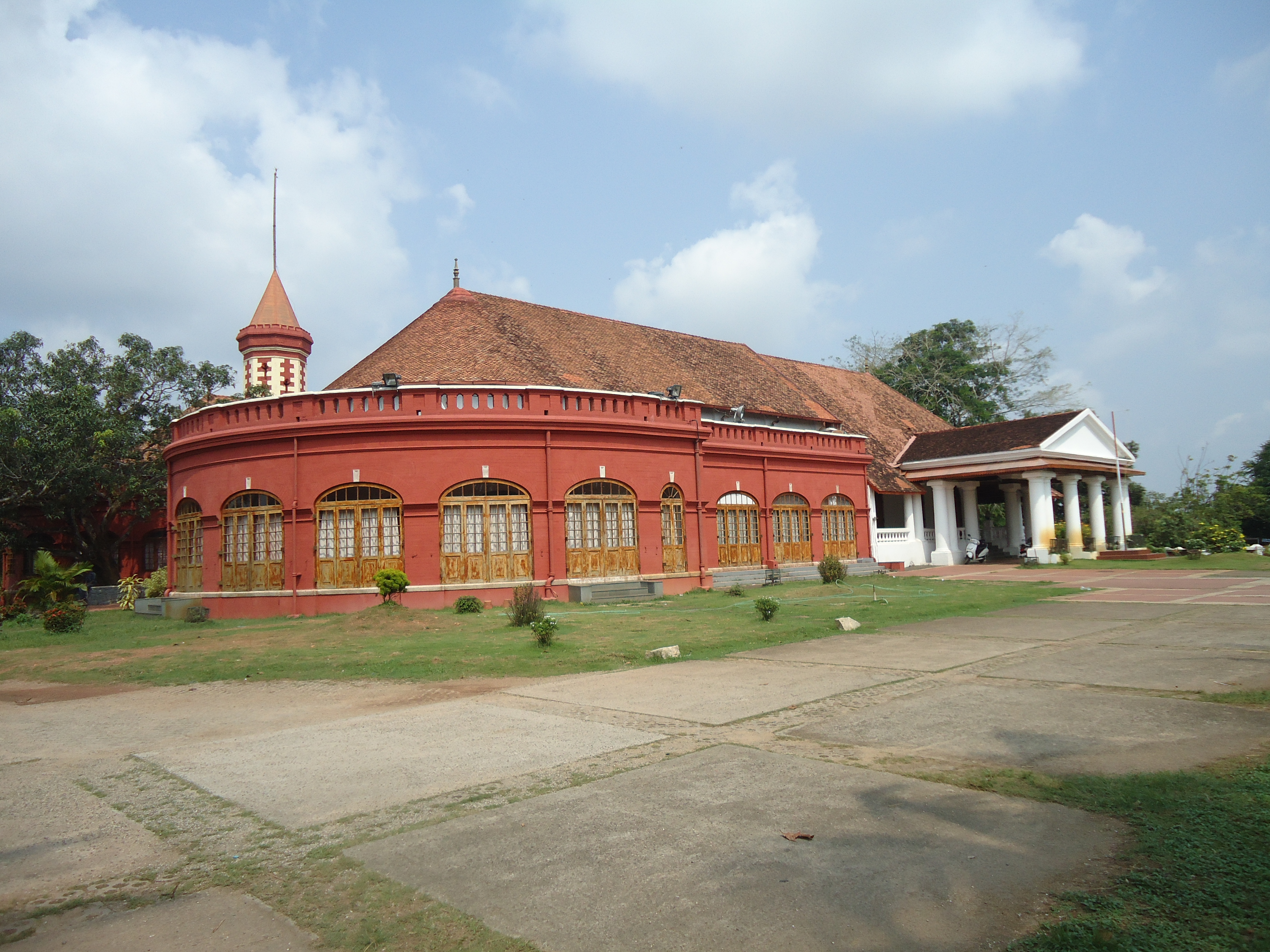
Kanakakkunnu Palace View

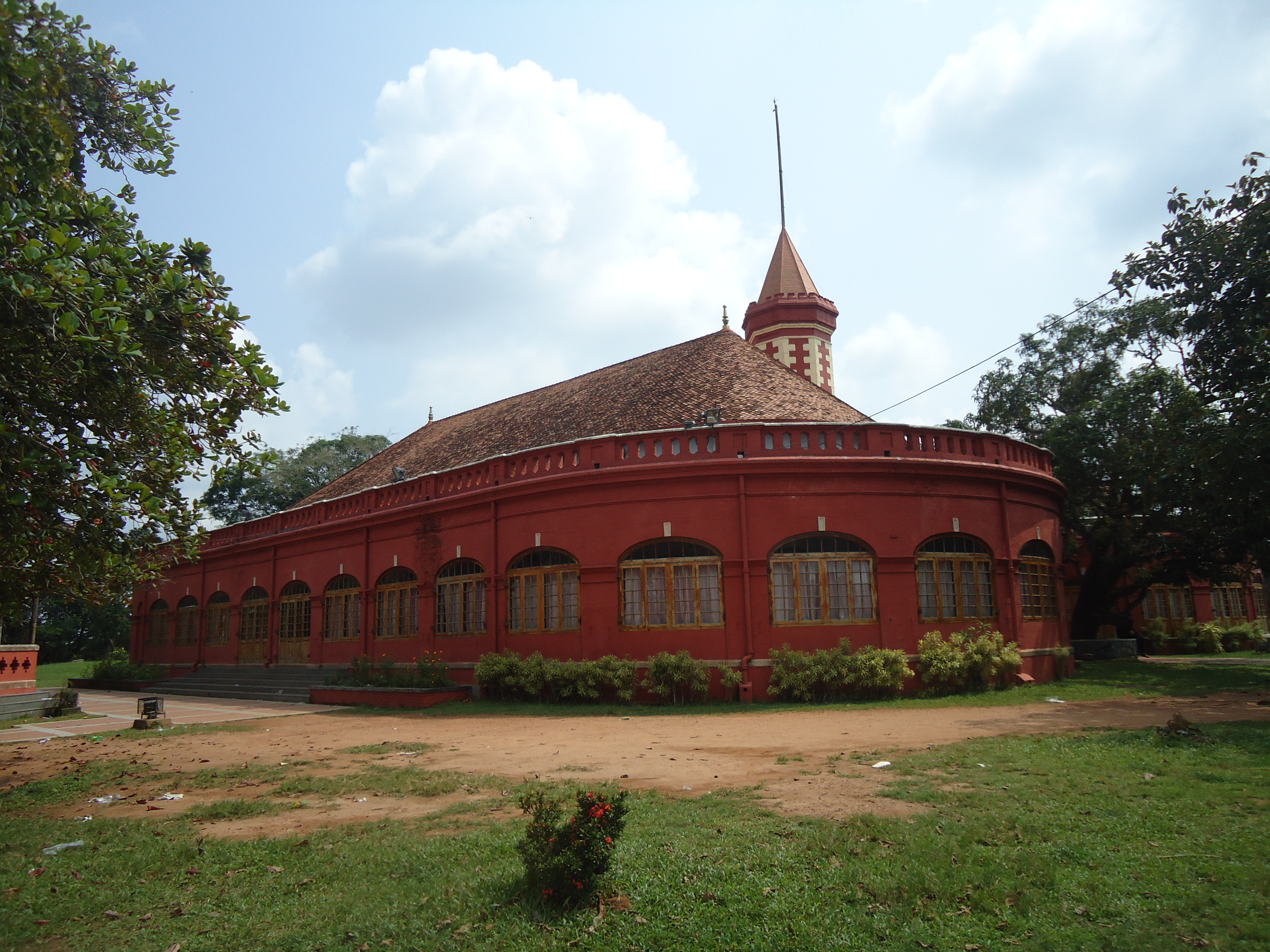
Kanakakkunnu Palace Other Side

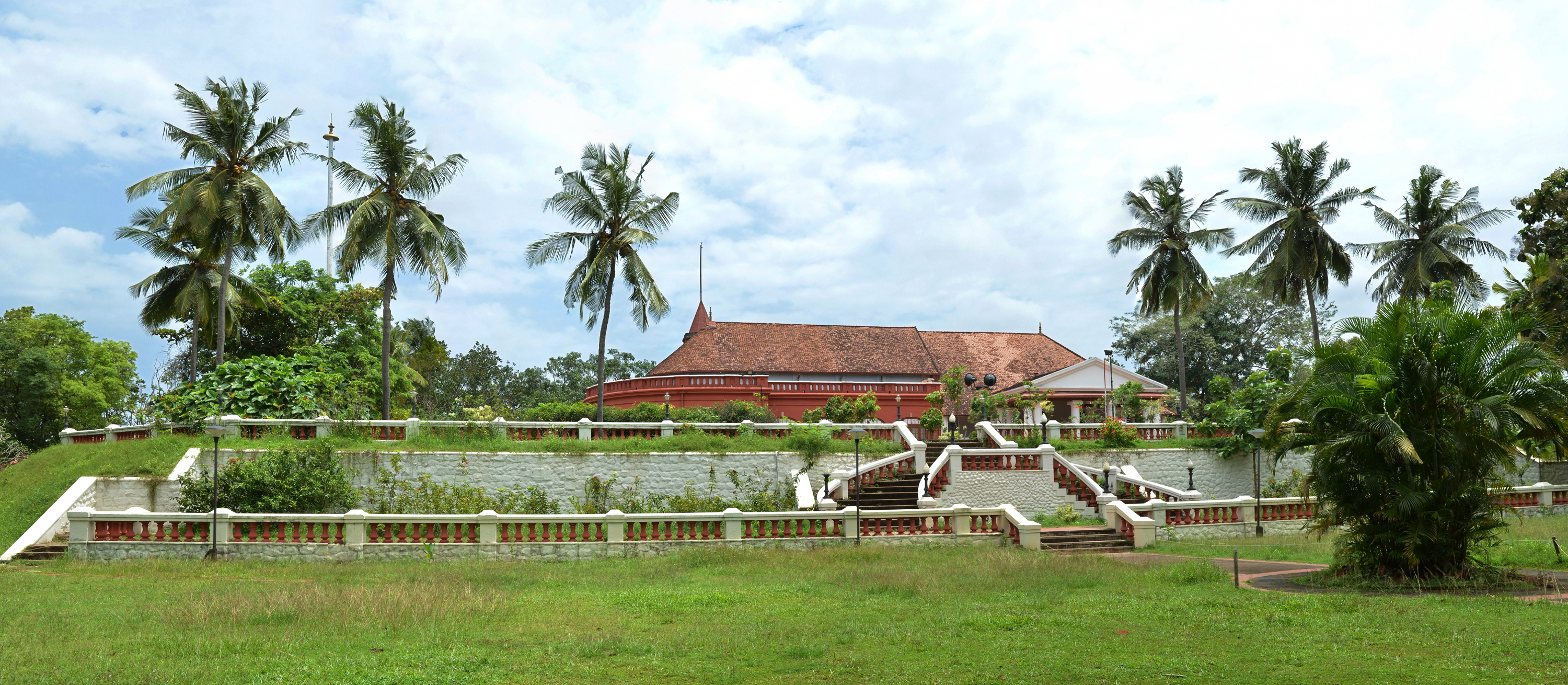
A full view of Kanakakkunnu Palace at Thiruvananthapuram

Kanakakkunnu Palace is situated in Thiruvananthapuram near the Napier museum, India. It served as an official residence for Sir C.P. Ramaswami Iyer during his dewanship, in addition to Bhakti Vilas and Padma Vilas.

It is India's first digital garden, created by Akhilesh S. V. Nair and A. Gangaprasad, University of Kerala, Department of Botany.

Today the palace and its sprawling grounds are the venue for many cultural meetings and programmes. An all India Dance Festival (October – March) is organised by the Department of Tourism every year. During this period the classical Indian Dance performances are conducted every day.

== History ==
It is said to be built by Sree Moolam Thirunal. In the past it has been later used by the Travancore royal family to entertain its guests and serve non-vegetarian food as the royal family was vegetarian. It is now protected by the Kerala Tourism Development Corporation the palace plays host to a lot of cultural meets and programs. The Indian National Trust for Art and Cultural Heritage (INTACH) has listed this place as a heritage monument. Two Malayalam movies, Lucifer and its sequel L2 Empuraan, both which were written by Murali Gopy, directed by Prithviraj Sukumaran and starring Mohanlal in the lead titular role were shot here.

== Details ==
Located about 800 meters north east of the Napier Museum in the heart of Thiruvananthapuram city, Kanakakunnu Palace is one of the last architectural vestiges of the colonial era. Built during the reign of Travancore king Sree Moolam Thirunal (1885−1924) with the help of Vishwakarmas, the palace served as the main venue for royal banquets. Later Chithira Thirunal, one of Travancore’s popular rulers, refurbished the palace and constructed tennis courts in the premises. He also did use it for a few years as a summer retreat.

Now under the Kerala government’s wing, the palace complex walls-in the Nishagandhi open-air auditorium and Sooryakanthi auditorium. The auditoriums are the venues for various cultural meets and programs. The All India Dance Festival aka Nishagandhi festival is hosted annually by the Department of Tourism at the Nishagandhi open-air auditorium. Indian classical dance exponents from across the country come down to participate in the festival.

== Prominent events ==
Prominent events
Event	Periodicity	Notes
All India Dance Festival aka Nishagandhi festival	Annual	
Mathrubhumi International Festival of Letters	Annual	Literature Festival
