= Turks in India =

Expatriate group

Hindistan'daki Türkler (Turkish)
- (Turkey) (India)

Total population
- 2000+ (Turkish as mother tongue)

Regions with significant populations
- Uttar Pradesh, Gujarat

Languages
- Turkish

Religion
- Islam

Turks in India are ethnic Turkish people living in India. They are very small in number, and are mostly recent immigrants from Turkey. In the 1961 census, 58 people stated that their mother tongue was Turkish. According to the 1911 census, 1778 residents of India stated their place of birth as Turkey. In a state visit during early 2010, Prime Minister Abdullah Gül of Turkey met Turkish expatriates living in India and handed out Hindi-Turkish dictionaries to Turkish students in New Delhi.

== See also ==
- India–Turkey relations
- Mughal people
- Turkish diaspora
- Immigration to India
