= Operation Brahma =

India's disaster relief and rescue operation in Myanmar

- Part of 2025 Myanmar earthquake
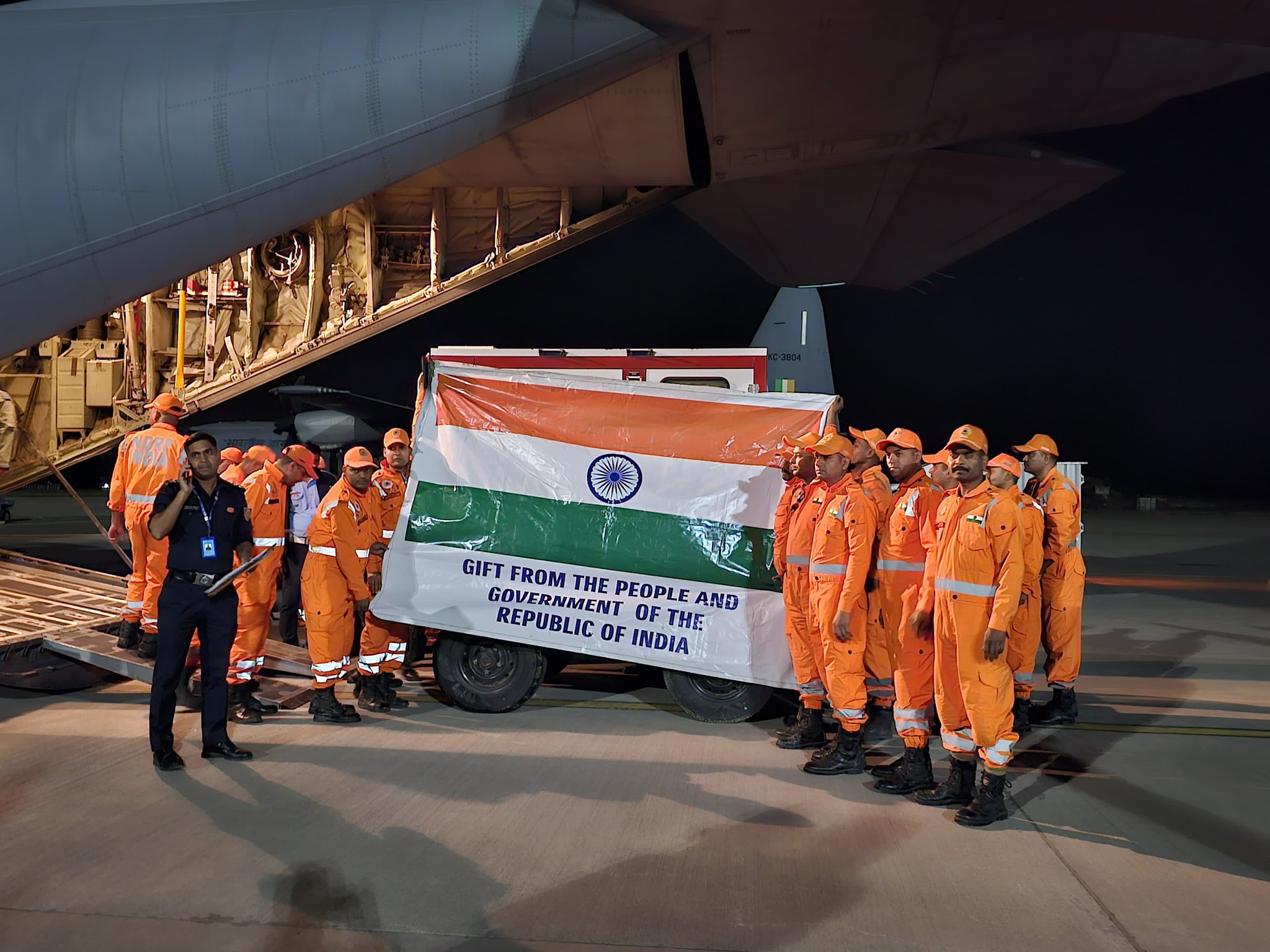
- Airlift by IAF consist NDRF volunteers and equipments for rescue operations.
- Operational scope: Humanitarian relief
- Location: Myanmar
- Planned by: Indian Armed Forces and Minister of External Affairs (India)
- Objective: Relief and rescue operations in Myanmar
- Date: 29 March 2025
- Executed by: Indian Armed Forces, Indian Air Force, National Disaster Response Force

Operation Brahma was a disaster relief and rescue operation undertaken by the Indian government in response to the 2025 Myanmar earthquake. External Affairs Minister S. Jaishankar announced that India initiated the operation on 28 March 2025 led by the Indian Army. As part of the operation, a specialised medical task force was deployed to deliver urgent medical care, including emergency treatments, trauma management, and surgical interventions for those in need.

== Etymology ==
The mission has been named Operation Brahma, after the Hindu God of creation, symbolising India's efforts to assist in the rebuilding of Myanmar following the devastating earthquake. The name reflects the nation's commitment to providing immediate relief and supporting long-term recovery and reconstruction in the affected regions.

== Background ==
On 28 March 2025, a devastating 7.7-magnitude earthquake struck Myanmar at 12:50 pm local time, causing widespread destruction and loss of life. The quake, originating from the right-lateral Sagaing Fault, was followed by a 6.4-magnitude aftershock, further impacting the region. The death toll has risen to over 1,600, with thousands injured and many still missing. The tremors were felt as far as Bangkok, Thailand, leading to building collapses and casualties there as well.

Prime Minister of India, Narendra Modi expressed deep concern over the earthquake. In a post on X, he conveyed condolences to Myanmar's junta chief, Min Aung Hlaing, stating, "As a close friend and neighbour, India stands in solidarity with the people of Myanmar in this difficult hour."

== Objective ==
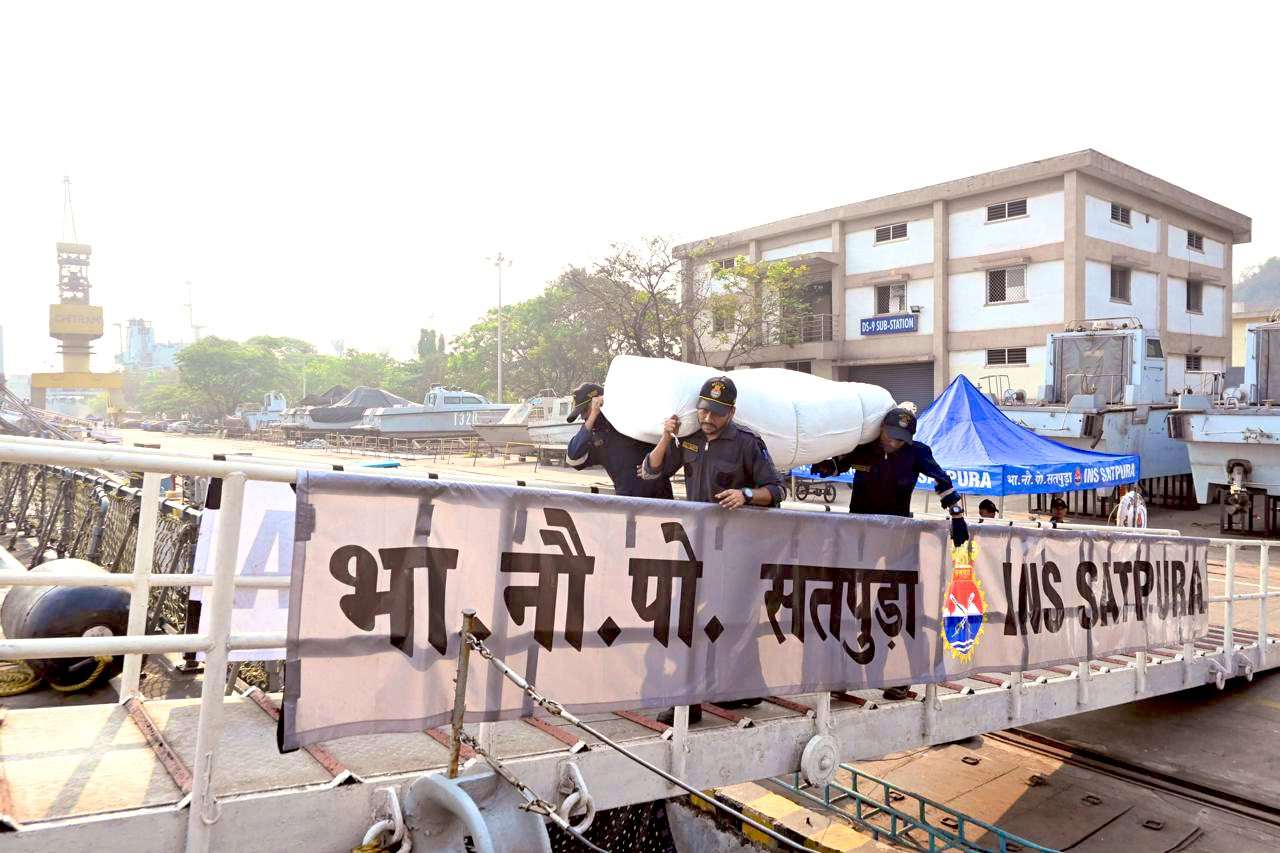
1. INS Satpura

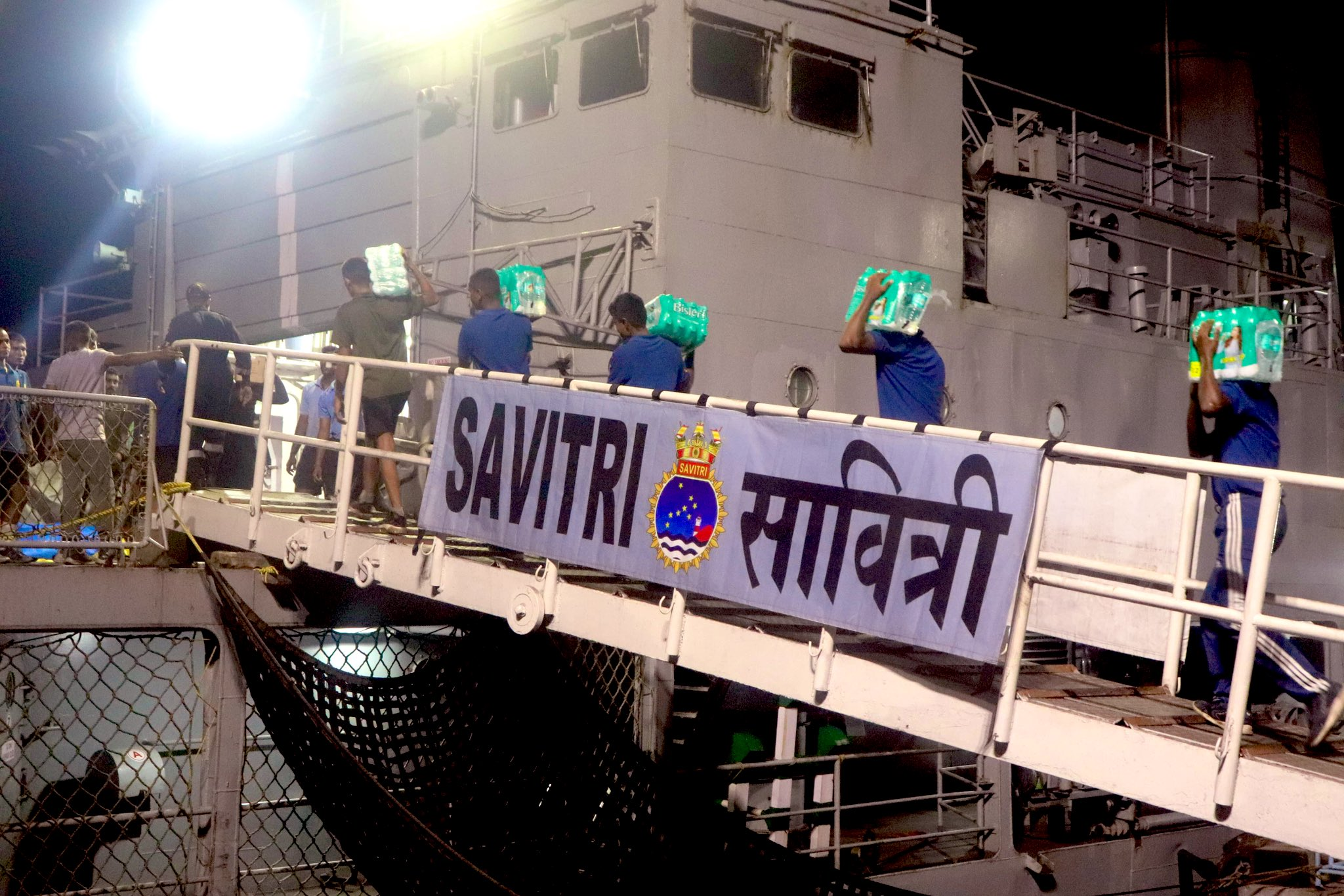
2. INS Savitri

India sent 40 tonnes of humanitarian aid through patrol vessels of the Indian Navy

The operation's primary objective is to provide immediate humanitarian assistance, including search and rescue efforts, medical aid, and support to affected populations in the aftermath of a seismic event. The operation reflects India's preparedness and response capabilities to large-scale disasters, underscoring the nation's commitment to providing swift assistance in times of crisis. The overall aim is to alleviate suffering and support recovery efforts in the aftermath of a catastrophic event. It demonstrated India's commitment to supporting neighboring countries in times of crisis.

It follows a similar framework to other well-known Indian disaster response initiatives, such as Operation Rahat (2013 North India floods), Operation Maitri (2015 Nepal earthquake) and more recently Operation Dost (2023 Turkey–Syria earthquakes).

== Timeline ==
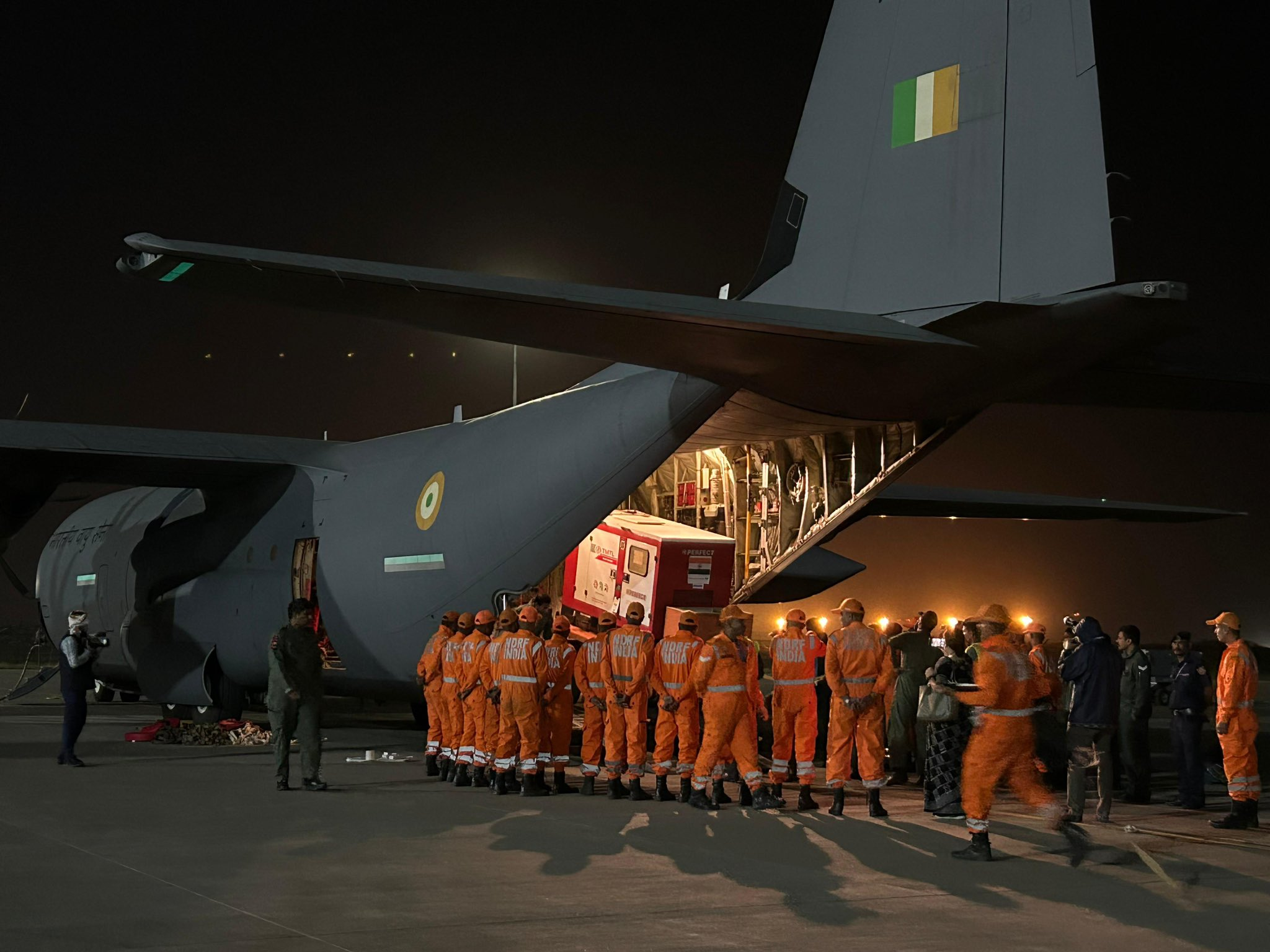
IAF's C-130 being loaded with blankets, tarpaulin, hygiene kits, sleeping bags, solar lamps, food packets and kitchen set along with search & rescue team, and medical team

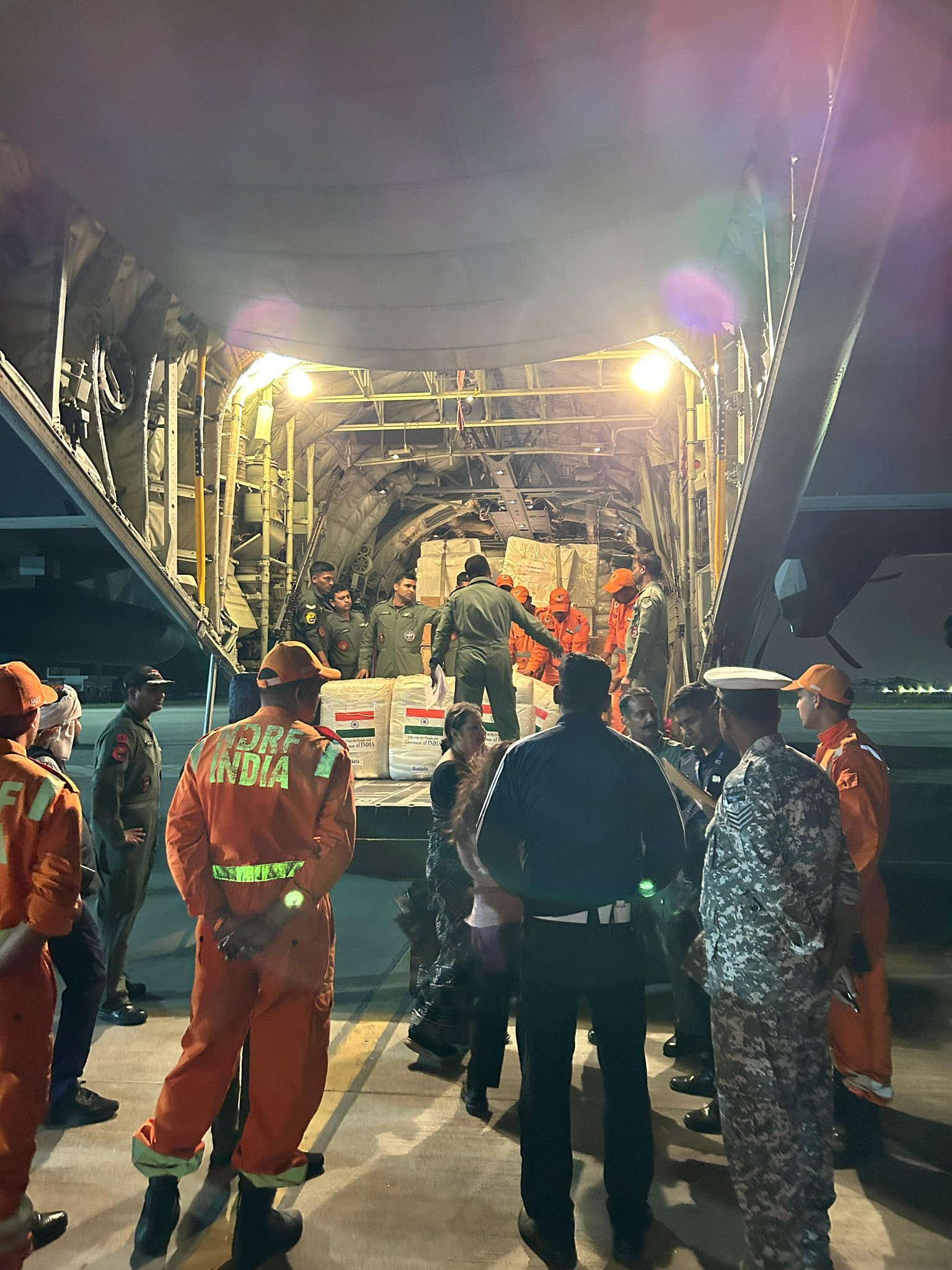
NDRF team with the humanatarian aid, heading for Myanmar for rescue operation

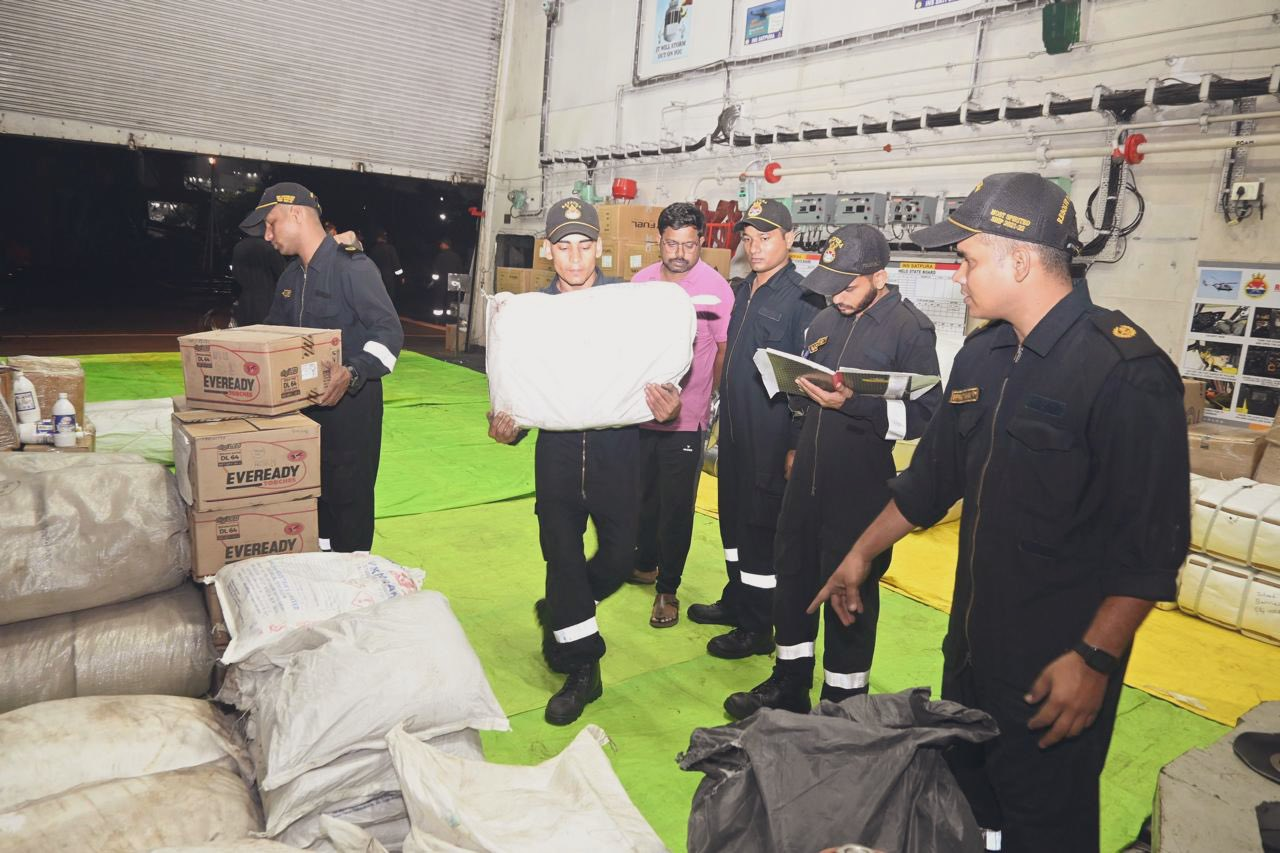
Indian Navy officials loading INS Satpura & INS Savitri with 40 tonnes of humanitarian aid, heading for the Port of Yangon

The deployment is closely coordinated with the Ministry of External Affairs and in partnership with Myanmar’s authorities, ensuring a swift and efficient response to the humanitarian emergency.

=== 29–30 March ===
A 118-member team from the elite Shatrujeet Brigade Medical Responders, led by Lieutenant Colonel Jagneet Gill, was deployed to Myanmar, accompanied by essential medical equipment and supplies. The Airborne Angels Task Force, specially trained and equipped to provide advanced medical and surgical care in disaster-affected zones were part of the critical response.

As part of Operation Brahma, the Indian Army established a 60-bed Medical Treatment Centre to provide immediate care to those injured in the earthquake. The facility was equipped to handle trauma cases, perform emergency surgeries, and deliver essential medical services, thereby supporting Myanmar's local healthcare system, which had been severely overwhelmed by the disaster.

India sent approximately 15 tons of relief material to Yangon via a C-130J military transport aircraft of the Indian Air Force (IAF). The cargo included essential supplies tents, sleeping bags, blankets, ready-to-eat meals, water purifiers, solar lamps, generator sets, and essential medicines. These items were crucial for providing immediate relief to those affected by the earthquake, supporting both the basic needs and the healthcare requirements of the displaced population. An 80-member National Disaster Response Force (NDRF) search and rescue team was also departed for Myanmar's capital, Nay Pyi Taw, to aid in relief efforts.

India also dispatched two naval ships to Myanmar as part of its ongoing relief efforts. Additionally, a field hospital was slated to be airlifted to provide further medical assistance and support to the affected regions.

The Indian Navy also dispatched four naval ships for relief operations. While INS Satpura and INS Savitri under the Eastern Naval Command sailed from Visakhapatnam on 29 March, INS Karmuk and IN LCU 52 under the Andaman and Nicobar Command sailed from Port Blair on 30 March. The ships combined embarked 52 Tons of relief materials including "HADR pallets consisting of essential clothing, drinking water, food, medicines, and emergency stores".

According to several reports, IAF aircraft faced GPS spoofing during their relief operations.

=== 31 March-1 April ===
The first two Navy ships INS Satpura and INS Savitri arrived at Yangon with 40 tons of relief materials on 31 March. The next day, IN LCU 52 and INS Karmuk with 30 tons of relief materials reached Yangon. A total of five Navy ships and six Air Force aircraft have been dispatched to Yangon, Naypyitaw and Mandalay in Myanmar. The fifth ship was INS Gharial, sailed out of Visakhapatnam harbour on 1 April with 440 tonnes of rice, edible oil and medicines and will reach Yangon by 6 April. Additionally, the Indian Army also established a 200-bed field hospital the same day. The hospital, set up by Shatrujeet Brigade Medical Responders, was airlifter to Myanmar by two Boeing C-17 Globemaster III of the Indian Air Force

By April 1, 2025, a C-130J aircraft delivered 16 tons of humanitarian aid to Mandalay Airport, which was handed over to Lieutenant General Myo Moe Aung and other dignitaries of the Myanmar government.

Additionally, an 80-member search and rescue team from the National Disaster Response Force (NDRF) was deployed across more than a dozen sites in Mandalay to assist in relief efforts.

=== 3 April ===
By April 3, 2025, the NDRF had recovered 50 bodies, with 15 additional recoveries reported that day, while continuing operations at two key sites in Mandalay amid mild tremors. The field hospital treated 154 patients on April 3 alone, bringing the total to 394, and conducted two major and nine minor surgeries. Indian community volunteers also began assisting with relief efforts, showcasing a collaborative approach.

=== 4-8 April ===
As of April 8, 2025, the Indian Army reported treating 1,370 patients in total, with 258 treated alone being treated on 8 April, alongside 33 surgeries, 698 lab tests, and 150 X-rays performed. The Ministry of External Affairs confirmed on April 9, 2025, that India had delivered over 656 metric tons of humanitarian assistance through seven Indian Air Force aircraft and five Indian Navy ships. The 80-member NDRF team, initially deployed for rescue operations, completed its mission and returned to India by the date.

=== 11 April ===
Indian Army deployed AI-powered robotic systems to support rescue efforts. Among these were SAR Robo Mules such as AI-driven, four-legged robots capable of navigating unstable and debris-filled terrain. The robotic mules had played some key role in assessing structural damage and delivering critical supplies to areas that were otherwise inaccessible.

In addition, India deployed nano drones equipped with thermal imaging cameras to locate survivors trapped under rubble. The compact drones were also guided by AI and it could fly through narrow spaces and detect heat signatures which can enable rescue teams to identify and reach survivors.

=== 13 April ===
An Indian Air Force (IAF) C-130J Hercules aircraft was deployed to encounter GPS signal jamming issues near the Myanmar border.

=== 15 April ===
The IAF dispatched a C-17 aircraft carrying components of 20 pre-fabricated office structures, weighing approximately 50 tonnes, to Naypyidaw, Myanmar.

=== 16 April ===
The Indian Army’s Field Hospital team returned to India after completing its mission. The team consisted of 118 personnel.

== Outcome ==
Operation Brahma has been widely known as a successful humanitarian intervention due to India’s swift response as the first responder, deploying an 80-member NDRF team and substantial resources within hours of the earthquake. It has established fully operational field hospitals, has treated over 1,370 patients and delivered 656 metric tons of aid by April 9.

Over 2,500 patients were treated and 65 major surgeries were performed in the quake-ravaged region by the Indian hospital, established under the operation. It also conducted over 1,300 laboratory investigations and 103 X-ray procedures.

== Gallery ==
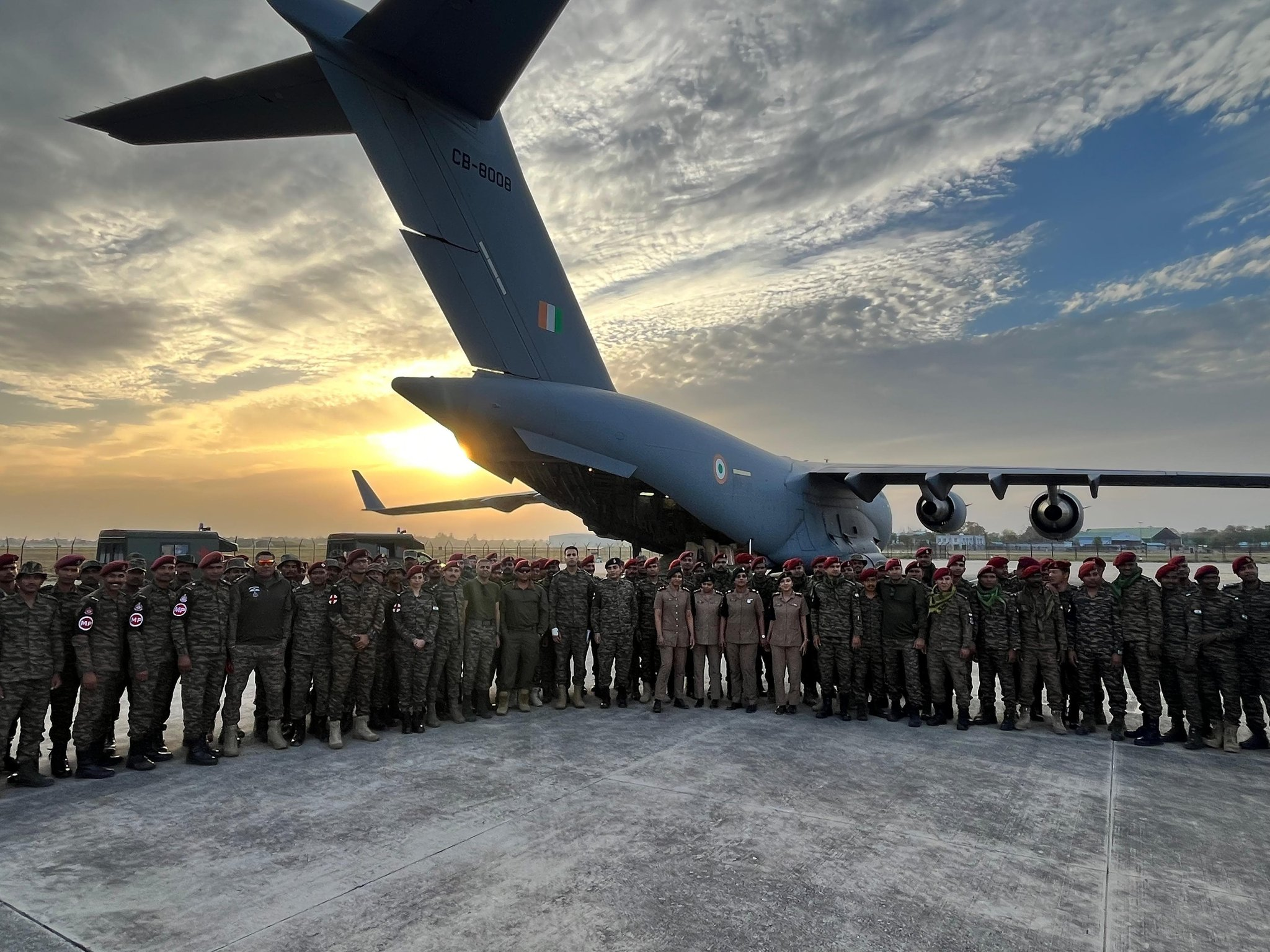
Shatrujeet Brigade Medical Responders

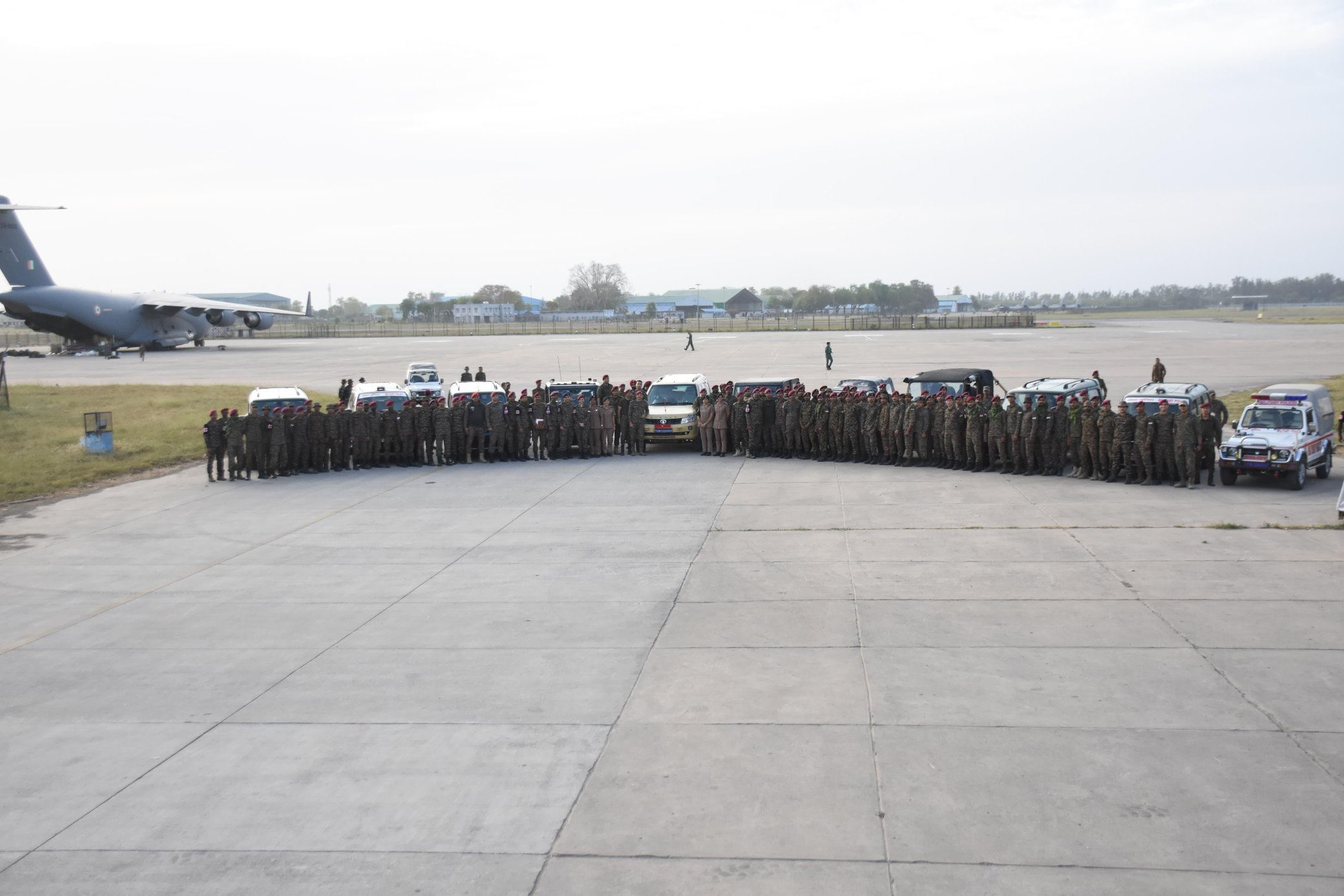
Shatrujeet Brigade Medical Responders

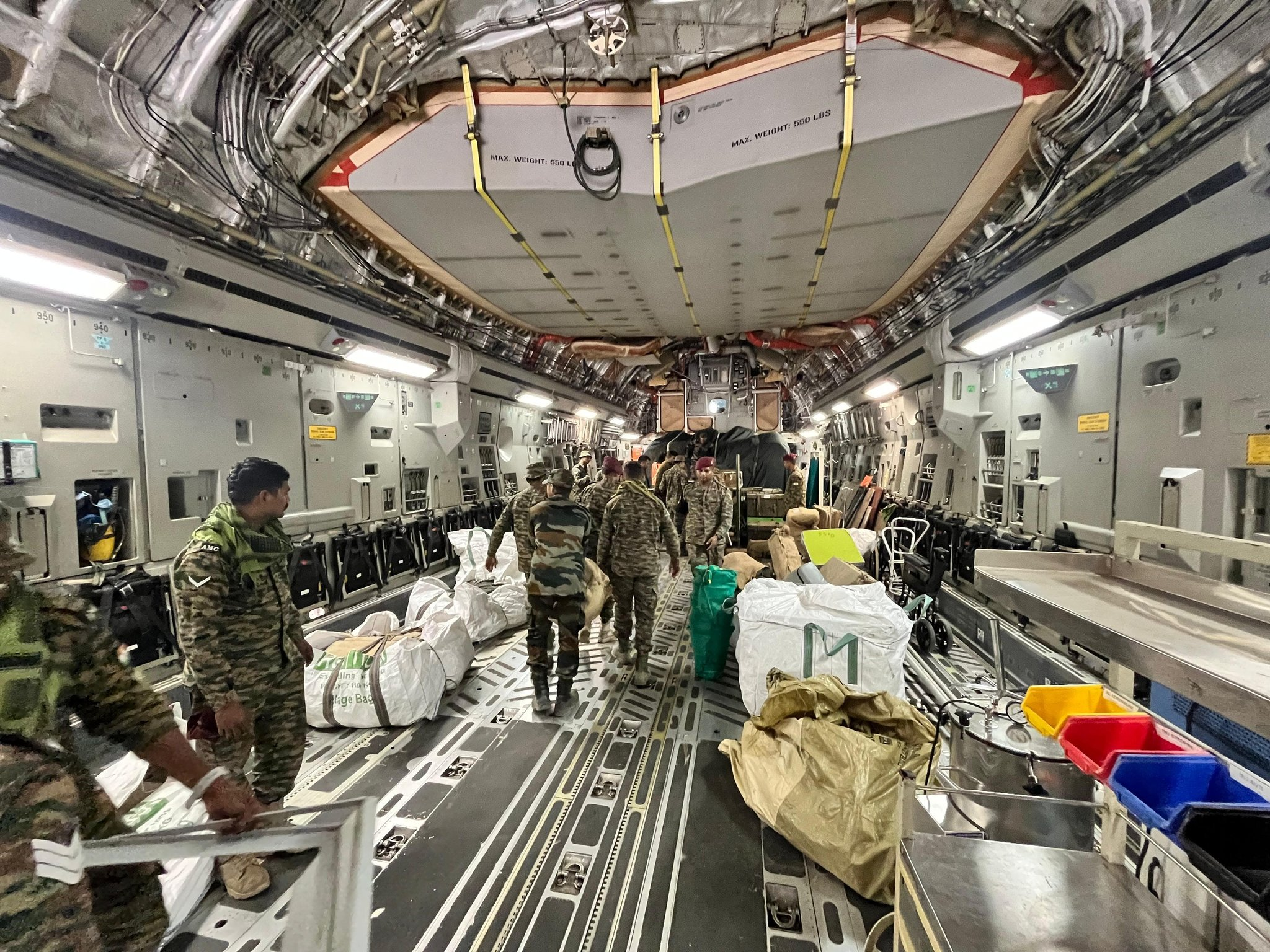
Shatrujeet Brigade Medical Responders

== See also ==
- Operation Maitri
- Operation Dost
- List of populated places affected by the 2025 Myanmar earthquake
