= Bhakti Vilas =

19th century Indian palace

Coordinates: 8°29′54″N 76°57′41″E

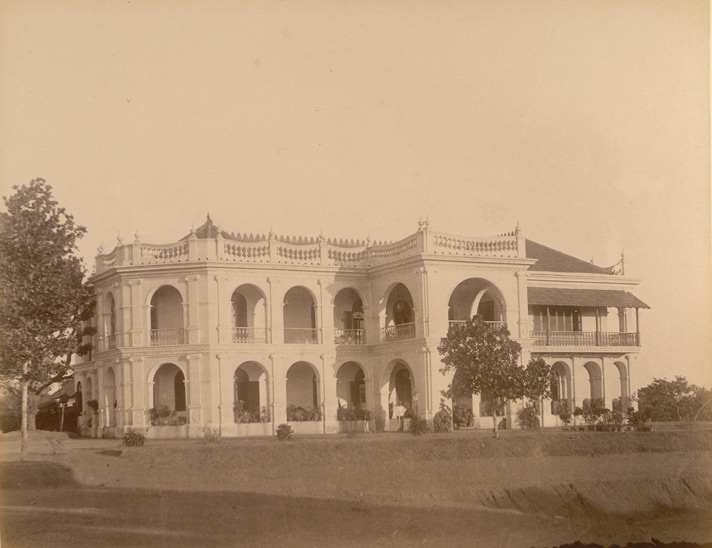
Bhakti Vilas Palace, Thiruvananthapuram

Bhakti Vilas, also known as Bhakti Vilasom, was a state palace in Travancore, at Vazhuthacaud, in the capital Thiruvananthapuram, India, built at the end of the 19th century. It was formally the secondary official residence of the Diwan of Travancore outside of the royal fort complex, the primary official residence being Padma Vilas, but widely preferred by most Diwans. The style, that of a bungalow, hybridized traditional Malayali kovilakam architecture with western elements: the palace featured a traditional nadumuttam, or interior courtyard, but one spatially differing from the classical atrium of a Nālukettu. Bhakti Vilas further accented its semicircular arches with pilasters of a modified Ionic order. During the premiership of Sir C.P. Ramaswami Iyer, Bhakti Vilas was placed at his disposal as one of his official residences, although he also enjoyed Kanakakunnu Palace as his primary official residence.

In 1952, Travancore Radio became All India Radio Thiruvananthapuram and its office shifted from Palayam to Bhakti Vilas Palace.
