= Indians in Cyprus =

Total population
- 7,250

Regions with significant populations
- Nicosia

Languages
- Greek · English · Hindi · Various Indian Languages

Religion
- Hinduism · Christianity · Islam · Sikhism · Religions of India

Related ethnic groups
- Person of Indian Origin

The community of Indians in Cyprus includes Indian expatriates in Cyprus and Cypriot citizens of Indian origin or descent. Cyprus has a much smaller community of Indians than other western countries, at about 7,250 members. They work primarily in the field of ICT (Information, Communication, Technology) and the shipping industry. A large number are employed in various offshore companies. The multi-national company Amdocs maintains an office in Limassol which currently employs over 250 Indian computer programmers.

The community also includes many students who have come to Cyprus to pursue higher studies. The population has grown almost ten-fold since 1997, when there were barely 300-400 long term Indians present.

== Notable people ==
- Kodendera Subayya Thimayya - Chief of Army Staff (India)
- Vinod Adani, billionaire
- Surendra Hiranandani, billionaire
- Lila Irene Clerides,first lady

== See also ==
- Sikhism in Cyprus
- Cyprus–India relations
- Indians in Greece
- Indians in Turkey
- Hinduism in Cyprus
