= Indians in Turkey =

Ethnic group in the Republic of Turkey

Türkiye'deki Hintliler (Turkish)

Total population
- 1,000

Regions with significant populations
- Istanbul

Languages
- English • Malayalam • Telugu • Tamil • Turkish • Hindi • Gujarati • Indian Languages

Religion
- Hinduism, Islam, Sikhism

Indians in Turkey are a small community numbering around 1,000, comprising students, professionals and families. Most of them work as doctors and computer engineers or employees in multinational corporations. India also has a small business presence in Turkey through representative offices of Reliance Industries, Tata Motors, and Indorama.

Most Indians are Hindu and the community forms the bulk of Hindus in Turkey. In recent times, there have been efforts to promote tourism and culture from India as a means of developing the community and establishing better relations with Turkish society. There are also Hyderabadi Muslim students in Turkey and Sikhs in Turkey.

== History ==
=== Ancient era ===
Indians were employed in the Achaemenid army of Xerxes in the Second Persian invasion of Greece (480-479 BCE). All troops were stationed in Sardis, Lydia, during the winter of 481-480 BCE to prepare for the invasion. In the spring of 480 BCE "Indian troops marched with Xerxes's army across the Hellespont".

== Notable people ==
- Feroz Ahmad academic, historian, and political scientist

== See also ==
- India–Turkey relations
- Turks in India
