= Cyprus–India relations =

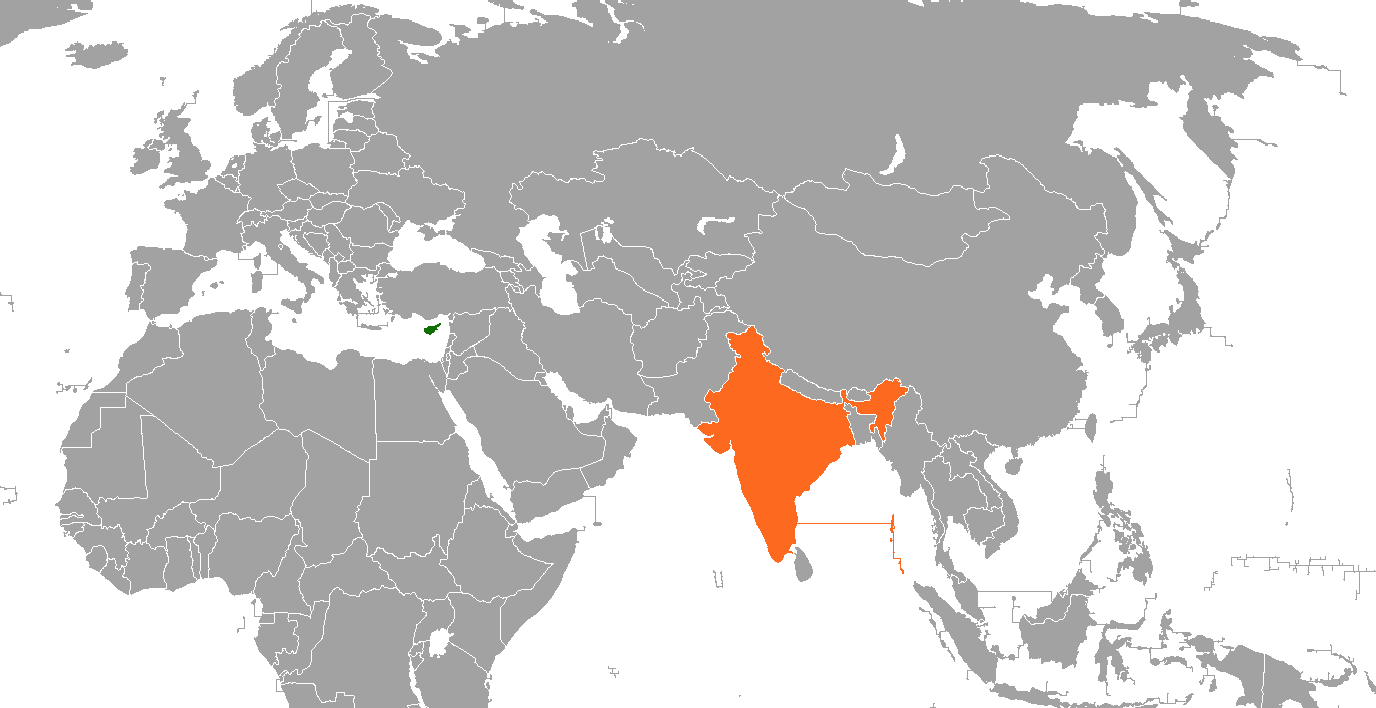
- Cyprus: India

Cyprus–India relations are the bilateral relations between Cyprus and India. India maintains a High Commission in Nicosia. Cyprus maintains a High Commission in New Delhi. Both countries are members of the Commonwealth of Nations.

== History ==
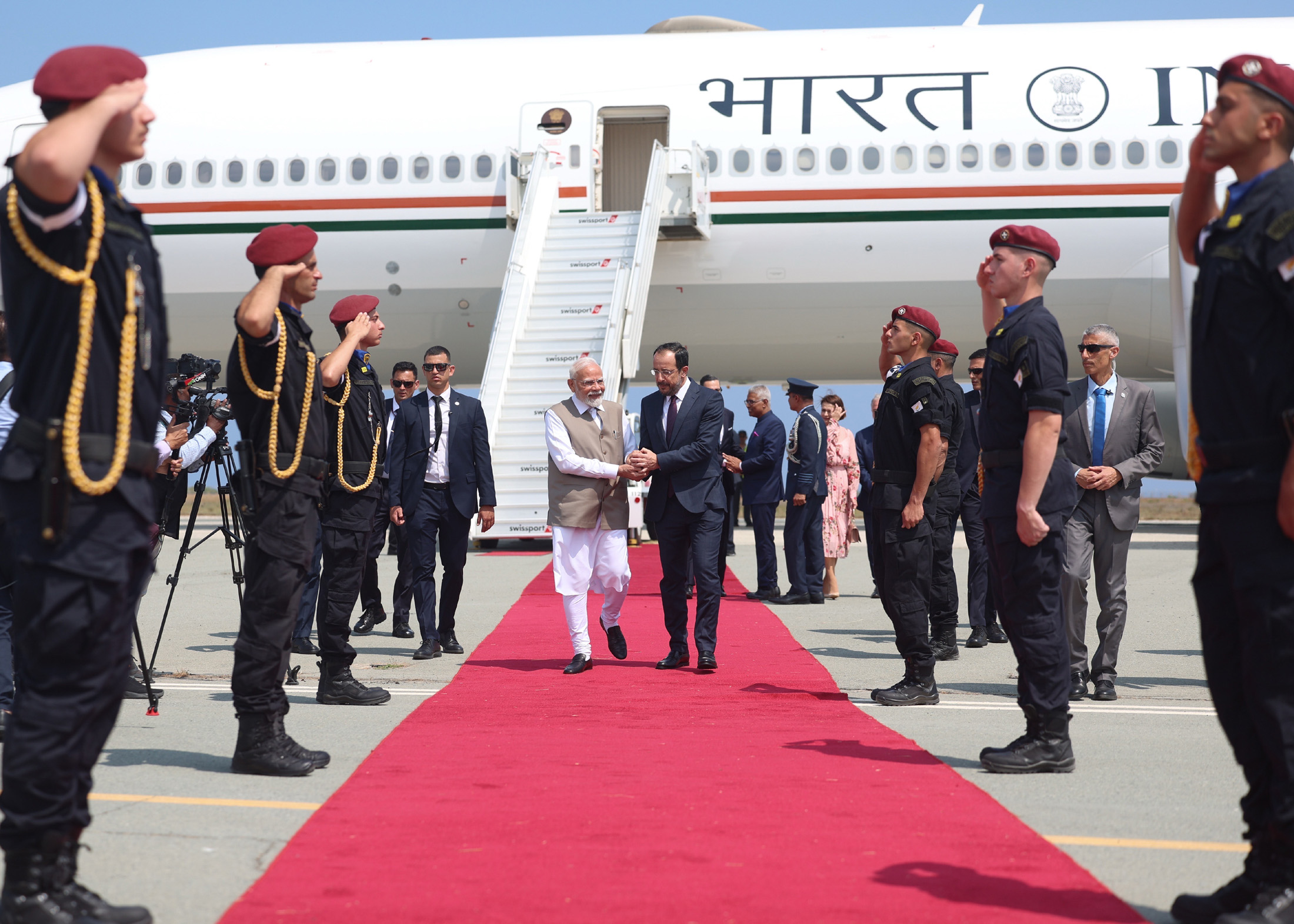
Prime Minister Modi is received by President of Cyprus Nikos Christodoulides upon his arrival in Nicosia; 2025

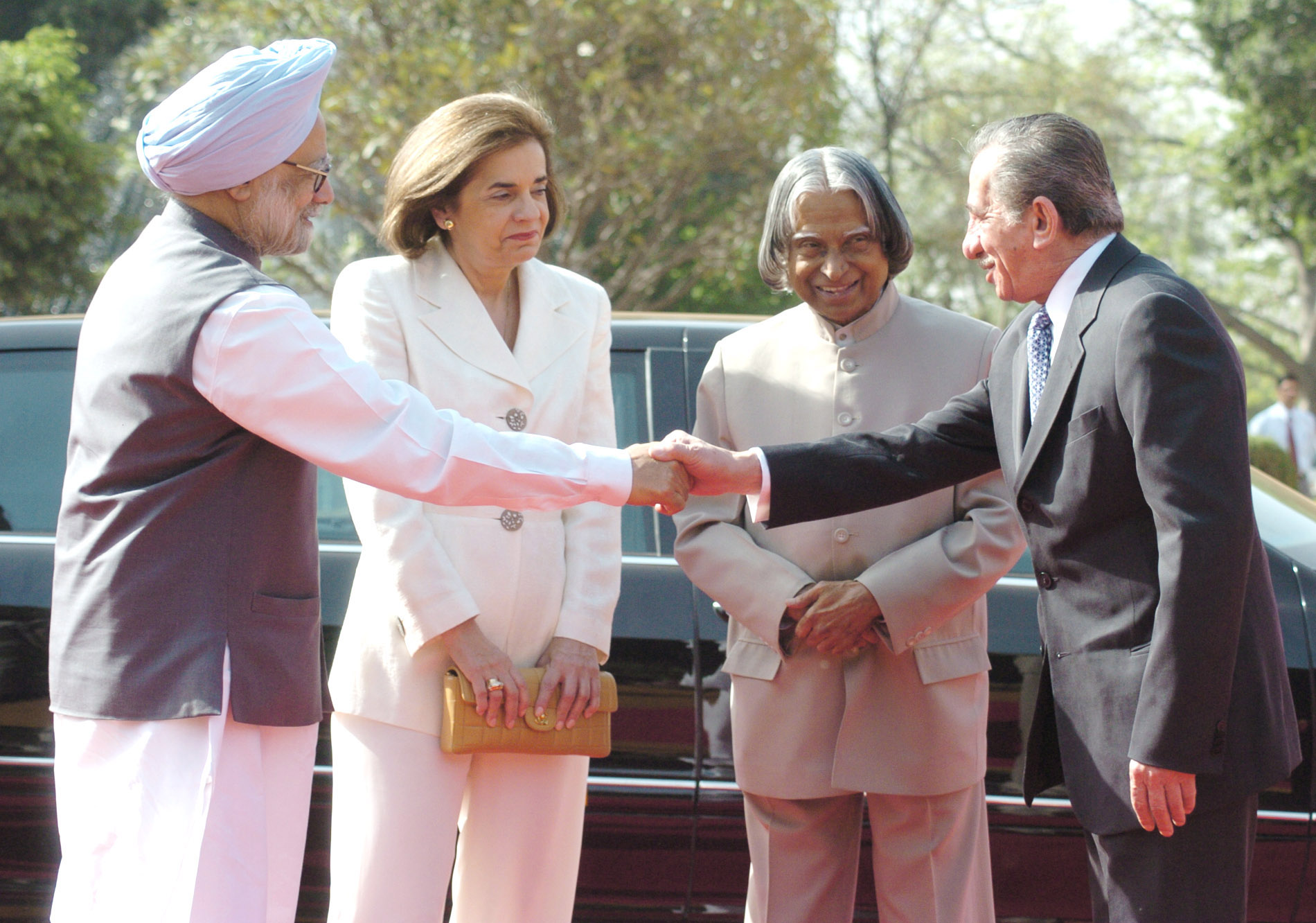
Indian Prime Minister Manmohan Singh and President APJ Abdul Kalam greet Cyprus President Tassos Papadopoulos at Rashtrapati Bhavan, New Delhi; 2006

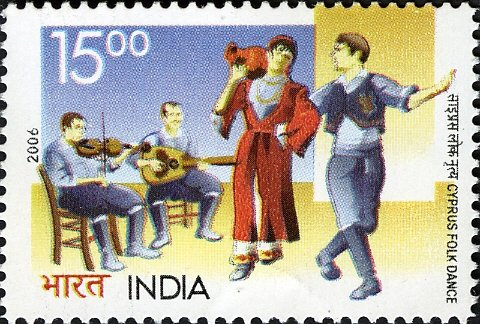
2006 India Post stamp depicting Cyprus folk dance.

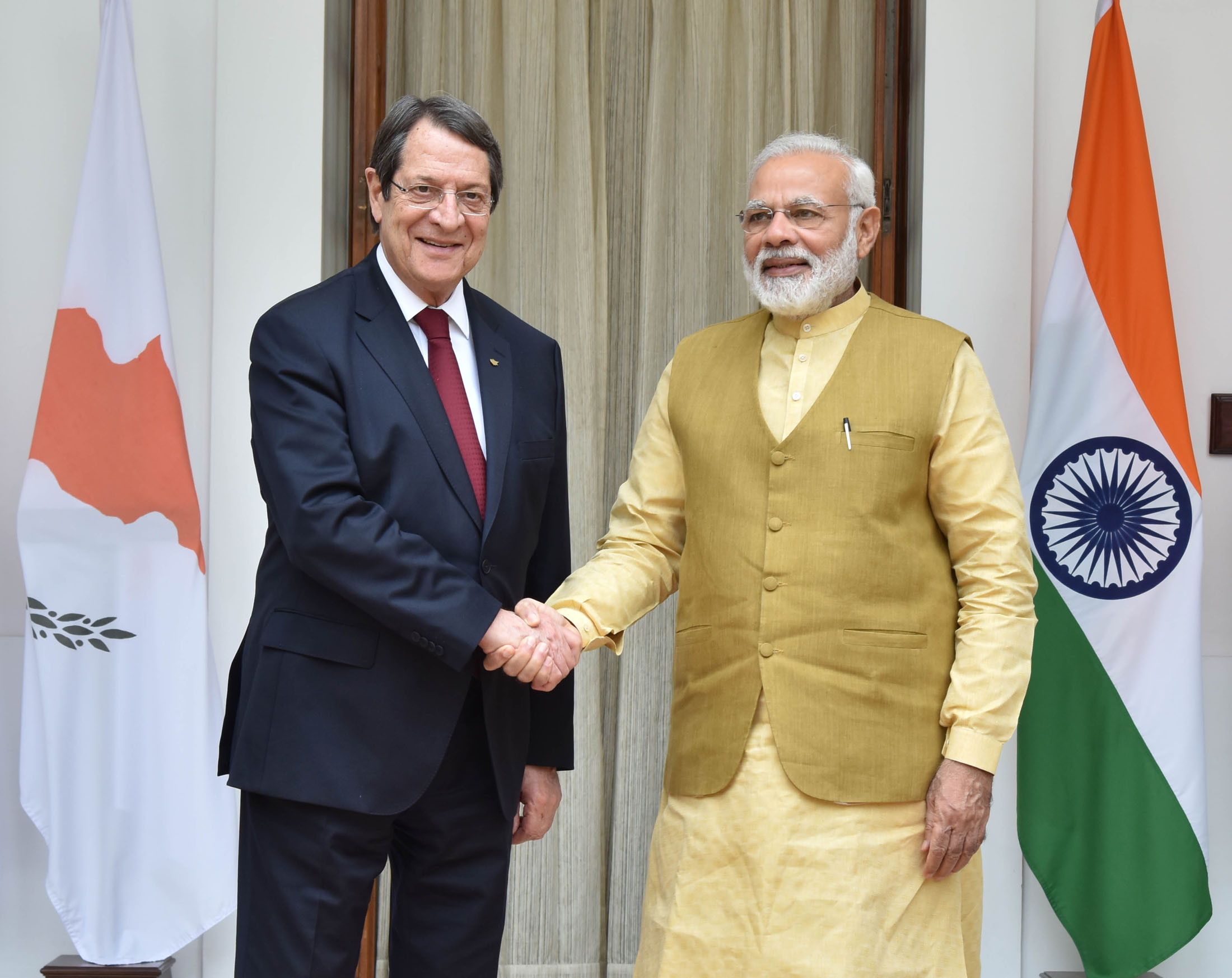
Cyprus President Nicos Anastasiades meeting Indian Prime Minister Narendra Modi at Hyderabad House, New Delhi; 2017

India supported Cyprus during its struggle for independence from British colonial rule. Diplomatic relations between Cyprus and India were established on 10 February 1962, two years after the former gained independence.

Cyprus supports the India–United States Civil Nuclear Agreement, and also supports India within the Nuclear Suppliers Group (NSG) and the International Atomic Energy Agency (IAEA).

Former First of Lady of Cyprus, Lila Erulkar, the wife of President Glafcos Clerides, was born in Ahmedabad and was of Indian Jewish descent. Her father, Dr Abraham Erulkar, was Mahatma Gandhi's personal physician in London in September 1946.^{[1]} The street in Nicosia on which the High Commission of India is located is named after Indira Gandhi. In India, an avenue in New Delhi is named after Archbishop Makarios III.

=== State visits ===
Prime Minister Atal Bihari Vajpayee visited Cyprus in October 2002. During the visit, Cyprus declared its support for India's candidature as a permanent member on the UN Security Council. President Pratibha Patil visited the country in October 2009. President Tassos Papadopoulos visited India in April 2006.

In June 2025, Indian Prime Minister Narendra Modi visited Cyprus, marking the first such visit in over two decades. During the visit, he was conferred the Grand Cross of the Order of Makarios III, Cyprus’s highest civilian honour, which he dedicated to the India–Cyprus friendship. Modi highlighted the award as a tribute to the people of India and a symbol of shared values such as Vasudhaiva Kutumbakam. His meetings with President Nikos Christodoulides and Cypriot business leaders underscored growing economic ties, including the formation of the India-Cyprus-Greece Business and Investment Council and a collaboration between the Cyprus Stock Exchange and India’s NSE in GIFT City. The visit reaffirmed a strengthening partnership based on mutual respect, democratic values, and increasing strategic and economic cooperation.

During a state visit by Cypriot President Nikos Christodoulides in May 2026, Indian President Droupadi Murmu announced the elevation of bilateral relations to a Strategic Partnership, focusing on defence, security, technology, and maritime cooperation, while reiterating India's support for Cyprus's sovereignty. Six pacts were signed, including an MoU on establishing a joint working group on counter-terrorism, on diplomatic training, on innovation and technology, establishment of official coordination and cooperation on Search and Rescue (SAR), on higher education and research and cultural cooperation from 2026 to 2030.

== Economic relations ==
In September 2005, the Cyprus-India Business Association (CIBA) was established to promote trade, investment, and business partnerships.

Bilateral trade between Cyprus and India totaled EUR 76.5 million in 2015. Cyprus imported 64.5 million and exported 11.1 million worth goods to India. Both countries traded steel and iron with each other.

Between April 2000 and September 2015, Cyprus invested a cumulative total of $8.328 billion making it the eighth largest FDI investor in India. Most of the investments are in the construction and real estate industries.

The Double Taxation Avoidance Agreement between Cyprus and India was revised in 2016.

There has been a deep engagement in the financial sector. In 2025, an MoU was signed between the NPCI International Payments Limited and Eurobank Cyprus. A framework was established to facilitate interoperability between India’s Unified Payments Interface and the Target Instant Payment Settlement System operated by the European Central Bank to enable seamless cross-border payments for tourists, businesses and investors.

== Defence relations ==
The Indian military has participated in United Nations peacekeeping operations in Cyprus on numerous occasions. Three Indian Generals have served as Commanders of the United Nations Peacekeeping Force in Cyprus (UNFICYP), since its creation in 1964. A road in Larnaca is named after Maj. General Kodandera Subayya Thimayya who died in 1965, while serving as the UNFICYP Force Commander. In 1966, the Government of Cyprus issued a stamp commemorating Thimayya.

The foundation of Cyprus-India defence cooperation was strengthened with the signing of the Bilateral Defence Cooperation Programme (BDCP) for 2025 in Nicosia on 23 January 2025, outlining joint activities in Cyprus and India, including a Joint Committee Meeting on Defence Cooperation.

In 2026, India and Cyprus announced a 5-year roadmap for defence cooperation from 2026 to 2031. Additionally, the two countries established a Technical Arrangement for the establishment of Official Coordination and Cooperation on Search and Rescue (SAR) matters between the JRCC Larnaca and the Indian Ministry of Defence. Cyprus also expressed interest in Indian indigenous weaponry citing the performance of Indian equipments during India's Operation Sindoor.

During Cypriot President Nikos Christodoulides' visit to New Delhi in May 2026, Cyprus expressed a keen desire to procure BrahMos cruise missiles and kamikaze drones (Nagastra-1 and Skystriker) from India. The prospect of such an acquisition triggered alarm in Turkish strategic circles, with analysts warning it could shift the regional military balance and threaten Turkey's security.

=== Maritime security ===
Indian Navy and Cyprus Navy have together taken part in PASSEX (Passing Exercise). For instance, in September 2025, INS Trikand, made a port call at Limassol Port and took part in the exercise.

== Scientific and technological cooperation ==
=== Space Sector ===
An Indian delegation including ISRO officials and representatives of Indian space-tech startup Pixxelspace India participated in 6th COSPAR 2025 Scientific Symposium themed "Humanity’s Challenges & Celestial Solutions" hosted in Nicosia by the Cyprus Space Exploration Organisation (CSEO) and the International Committee on Space Research (COSPAR).

== Cultural relations ==
On 24 October 1980, India and Cyprus signed an agreement on Cultural Cooperation in New Delhi. Both countries have committed to executive programs on culture since then. In April 2017, an Executive Programme for Cultural, Educational and Scientific Cooperation was signed.

== Indians in Cyprus ==
As of July 2015, around 2,700 Indian citizens reside in Cyprus. More than of half of them are employed as cosmetics industry, while the other common professions are computer engineers, software programmers and the shipping industry. Approximately 900 Indian students were enrolled at private colleges in Cyprus in 2010–11, but this number reduced to less than 100 by 2015, as Indian students were unable to find part-time jobs owing to the financial crisis in Cyprus.

== Triangular relations ==
=== Turkey ===
India does not recognize the Turkish Republic of Northern Cyprus. Its official position supports the sovereignty, independence, unity, and territorial integrity of the Republic of Cyprus, and it insists on a resolution of the Cyprus question under UN auspices — specifically on a bi-communal, bi-zonal federation with political equality, in accordance with UN Security Council Resolutions.

== Recent developments ==
Prime Minister of India Narendra Modi met the President of Cyprus Nicos Anastasiades in New York. There India and Cyprus agreed to enhance the trade as well as people to people relations, for the benefit of the citizens of both the countries.

India has reassured its support to Cyprus with respect to its territorial integrity.

== See also ==
- Foreign relations of Cyprus
- Foreign relations of India
- Indians in Cyprus
