= Burak Akçapar =

Turkish diplomat, scholar and author

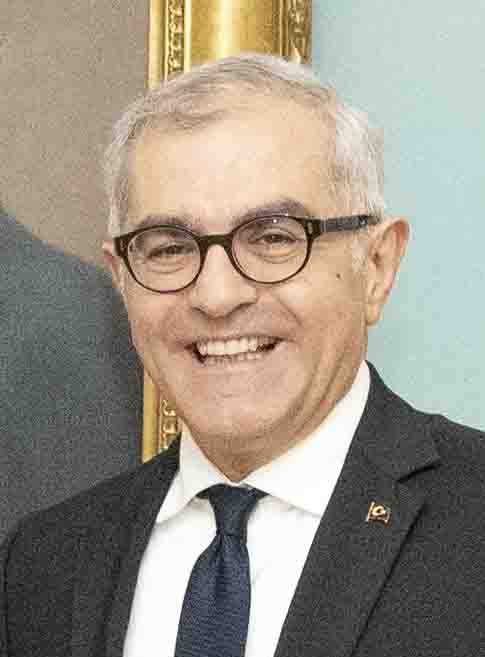
- Burak Akçapar in 2024

Permanent Representative of Turkey to the United Nations in Geneva
- Incumbent
- Assumed office July 2024

Deputy Minister of Foreign Affairs
- In office February 2023 – July 2024

Ambassador of Turkey to Spain
- In office May 2021 – March 2023

Ambassador of Turkey to India
- In office June 2011 – January 2017

Personal details
- Born: 1967 (age 58–59) Istanbul
- Children: 1
- Education: Boğaziçi University (BA); Hamburg University (PhD)
- Profession: Diplomat, author
- Awards: Best Ambassador of the Year Award 2022, Raia Diplomatica.; NATO Secretary General’s Award for Excellence.

Burak Akçapar (born May 27, 1967, Istanbul) is a Turkish diplomat, scholar, and author currently serving as Turkey's Permanent Representative to the United Nations Office at Geneva. Previously, he held the position of Deputy Minister of Foreign Affairs. Akçapar has served as Turkey's Ambassador to Spain from 2021 until 2023 and to India from 2011 until 2017. He is an associate professor of International Relations and the author of three books on topics related to diplomacy and international law.

== Early life and education ==
Akçapar earned his bachelor's degree in political science from Boğaziçi University in 1987 and received a Doctor of the Science of Law degree (magna cum laude) from Hamburg University. In 2015, he was awarded an honorary doctorate from Rai University in Gujarat, India.

== Diplomatic career ==
Akçapar started working at the Ministry of Foreign Affairs in 1988.

Timeline	Position	Country
December 1988 – May 1989	Candidate to career officer, Diplomacy Academy, Ministry of Foreign Affairs.	Turkey
May 1989 – April 1990	Candidate to career officer, Deputy Directorate General for Arms Control and Disarmament, Ministry of Foreign Affairs.	Turkey
April 1990 – December 1990	Military service, Turkish General Staff.	Turkey
December 1990 – August 1991	Diplomatic Attaché, Deputy Directorate General for Arms Control and Disarmament, Ministry of Foreign Affairs.	Turkey
August 1991 – September 1993	Third Secretary, Deputy Head of Mission, Embassy of the Republic of Türkiye to the State of Qatar.	Qatar
September 1993 – September 1996	Vice-Consul, Consulate General of the Republic of Türkiye in Hamburg.	Germany
September 1996 – September 1997	Second Secretary, Deputy Directorate General for Arms Control and Disarmament, Ministry of Foreign Affairs.	Turkey
September 1997 – August 1998	First Secretary, Deputy Directorate General for Arms Control and Disarmament, Ministry of Foreign Affairs.	Turkey
August 1998 – November 2002	International Staff Officer, Defense Planning and Operations Division of NATO.	Belgium
November 2002 – November 2004	Head of department, Deputy Directorate General for Policy Planning, Ministry of Foreign Affairs.	Turkey
November 2004 – November 2008	First Counsellor, Deputy Head of Mission, Embassy of the Republic of Türkiye to the United States.	USA
November 2008 – September 2009	Head of department, Deputy Directorate General for Policy Planning, Ministry of Foreign Affairs.	Turkey
September 2009 – July 2011	Deputy Director General for South Asia, Ministry of Foreign Affairs.	Turkey
July 2011 – January 2017	Turkey Ambassador Extraordinary and Plenipotentiary to the Republic of India. (Accredited to Sri Lanka (2011–12), Maldives and Nepal).	India
January 2017 – July 2018	Ambassador, Director General for Policy Planning, Ministry of Foreign Affairs.	Turkey
July 2018 – January 2019	Ambassador, Acting Director General for Conflict Prevention and Crisis Management, Ministry of Foreign Affairs.	Turkey
January 2019 – May 2021	Ambassador, Director General for Foreign Policy, Analysis and Coordination, Ministry of Foreign Affairs.	Turkey
May 2021 - February 2023	Turkey Ambassador Extraordinary and Plenipotentiary to Spain. Non-resident Ambassador to the Principality of Andorra.	Spain
November 2022 - February 2023	Permanent Representative to UN World Tourism Organization.	Spain
February 2023 – Present	Deputy Minister of Foreign Affairs.	Turkey

He is the 2002 recipient of NATO Secretary General's Award for Excellence for lasting contributions to the North Atlantic Alliance.

During his tenure at NATO, as Facilitator of the Southeast Europe Security Assistance Group, he led the efforts to promote regional cooperation among Balkan countries. Achievements included the Southeast Europe Common Assessment Paper on Regional Security Challenges and Opportunities (SEECAP) adopted by Ministers in Budapest on 29 May 2001.

== Research and publications ==
He was a columnist at Sunday Standard and the New Indian Express.

He has published three books;

- People's Mission to the Ottoman Empire,
- Turkey's New European Era,
- The International Law of Conventional Arms Control in Europe.

His research interests include international law, law of the sea, international security and international affairs.

- Taught courses on Political Risk Assessment at TOBB ETU and on problems in international security at METU in Ankara.
- His most recent book "People's Mission to the Ottoman Empire: Dr. Ansari and the Indian Medical Mission, 1912-13" is published by the Oxford University Press in 2014. He has launched the book in 2015 at Oxford University with a lecture published by the university as a podcast.
- He previously published an extensive study of Turkey's foreign policy and national security culture in "Turkey's New European Era" (2007, Rowman and Littlefield). Previous book: "The International Law of Conventional Arms Control in Europe" (Nomos, 1996).
- Also co-authored "The Debate on Democratization in the Broader Middle East and North Africa" (2004, Tesev). Other publications include among others "PfP as an Agent of Continuity and Change in the Euro-Atlantic Region" (in Gustav Schmidt ed. A History of Nato, 2001, Palgrave) and "Turkey's EU Accession" (2006, Yale Journal of International Relations) as well as "The Mutual Existence of Nascent and Senescent World Orders" (2009, Portland State University).

His book Turkey's New European Era: Foreign Policy on the Road to EU Membership received praise:

"This is a thought-provoking study by a Turkish diplomat with well-marshaled arguments. Akçapar provides the best and most up-to-date study of the benefits that Turkey offers European Union countries for gaining full membership in the EU. . . . Well written and argued, this book makes clear the growing importance of Turkey as a political player on the global stage, especially in the Middle East. Highly recommended."—Choice

"Turkey's bid for membership in the European Union could be one of the most important geopolitical events of the next few decades, with profound consequences for Europe's identity, the security and politics of Eurasia and the Middle East, and the debate about democracy in Muslim countries. Burak Akçapar, as one of the sharpest and most astute members of a new generation of Turkish diplomats, has a unique ringside seat on this unfolding drama. His book is worth reading for anyone with an interest in Europe's future."—Mark Leonard, Centre for European Reform

"Burak Akcapar's Turkey's New European Era is must-reading for anyone interested in Turkey and Europe. Akcapar's is the fresh and powerful voice of a younger generation of strategic thinkers in a country whose importance is destined to grow in the years ahead. His views on Turkey's quest to join the European Union highlight how much is at stake and how much better we need to understand these critical issues."—Ronald D. Asmus, Director, Transatlantic Center of the German Marshall Fund of the United States.

"Why does Turkey insist on EU membership? And why should the EU be interested in making Turkey a member? Skeptics would say that Turkey and the EU should each go its own way. Akçapar, a foreign policy practitioner, asserts that this is neither easy or possible. Turkey, the European Union, and the United States are tied to each other in important ways, as this seasoned diplomat explains with aptitude and clarity. A must-read for anyone who is for or against Turkey's EU membership."—Soner Cagaptay, Washington Institute for Near East Policy.

On Indian Medical Mission to the Ottoman Empire during the Balkan Wars of 1912-13

In his account, explains that concerned Muslims around India mobilized to dispatch three medical teams to treat wounded Ottoman soldiers. Among them, the one organized by Mohammad Ali Jauhar and directed by Mukhtar Ahmad Ansari caught the limelight, thanks to the regular letters sent home by the director of the Mission and published in the weekly Comrade journal. In the body of scholarship on Ottoman pan-Islamism, as a manifestation of pan-Islamist political ideology and Muslim internationalist action and its influence on the 1919 Khilafat Movement in India, the 1912-13 Indian Medical Mission has not been analysed in detail. His book studies the letters by the director of the Mission and the political and ideational context of the period to provide the first full narrative history of the Medical Mission, detailing its simultaneously humanitarian and political purposes and activities in Turkey. The book concludes that the Indian Mission was as much a humanitarian initiative as it was an effort to heal the pride of the Muslim population in India. The book therefore presents their story, the first ever in a book, reconstructing to the extent possible their thoughts, voice, and the era that shaped them. The book also presents a compelling case for the Ottoman Empire - something that has not been done too frequently, where he tries to correct a perceived historic wrong: the portrayal of Turks as despots in Western historiography.

On International law

Overall, his early scholarship on jurisprudence emphasized the New Haven approach to international law founded by Myres McDougal and Harold Lasswell at Yale Law School. The New Haven approach rejects formalist assessments and has been associated with norm scepticism. It has exerted significant influence since World War II. The ICJ President Higgins is known to belong to the New Haven school.

In 1996, he published The International Law of Conventional Arms Control in Europe, which recognized that “international law is under increasing pressure to cope with the complexity and vicissitudes of international life. This strain has only exacerbated in the aftermath of the Cold War, as demands for a new world order intensified calling in a new agenda of reform in international law. In a bid to maintain and indeed improve its character as an obligatory and objectified set of norms, principles and procedures governing all facets of the states of peace and war, international law responds to this challenge basically on two fronts. First, there is the effort to create law more rapidly and effectively. Thus, new types of sources of obligation and methods for creating them make their debut and take their place in the international legal order alongside the more traditional ones. Secondly, new subject-areas concerning international law make a showing in international relations, such as environmental law. This development conforms to the meaning of Article 13 of the UN Charter which requires the initiation of studies and recommendations encouraging the "progressive development of international law." A third path employ: regional cooperation schemes to build regional unified spaces "based on common political and legal principles, norms and values. This points out to a shift of emphasis from grandiose global codification efforts to more promising and less indolent regional arrangements.”

Against this background, he argued that "the bountiful miscellany of arms control agreements provide a vast resource, for monitoring all the above courses of development in international law. Indeed, as far as new forms of obligations are concerned, the Vienna Document on Confidence and Security Building Measures in Europe concluded to in the framework of a process based on a citadel of non-legally binding written arrangements: the Helsinki Final Act, distinguishes as one of the most pertinent politically binding agreements existing. The traditional approach, in this context, is represented by the 1990 CFE Treaty. Regarding new subject-areas, admittedly, the subject matter of these agreements is certainly not original. Their creative components are to be sought rather in their contents, although the contents of international agreements do not form part of international law per se. Arms control in general provides an original perspective into national security policy emphasizing cooperation and multilateralism in place of unconditional competition. Flowing from this pivotal idea, arms control agreements treat their contents in a systematic and cumulative fashion, each breakthrough being maintained and institutionalized not only at the follow-up agreements, but also at other arms control arenas. Ultimately, they are part of the effort contributing to the progressive development of international laws at a subject which is not yet covered by the classical definitions of international law. In so doing, they are not only reflecting thinking de lege feranda, but producing legally and politically binding international written agreements that create expectations and obligations for compliance (de lege lata) in an area as fundamental as national and international security."

Akçapar argued that arms control processes constitute one of the methods by which States seek to attain and strengthen minimum international public order. And, as all treaty-law, contractual arms control employs obligations, principles, institutions and procedures binding on the parties in this pursuit. Law is not the anti-thesis of force, neither in internal nor in international law. As all law, the law of arms control attempts to institutionalize cooperation, set standards of peaceful conduct, erect mechanisms to verify compliance, and develop appropriate procedures and institutions to deal with disputes and non-compliance.

Therefore, there is a persisting need to put arms control agreements into proper perspective. The central jurisprudential theme of this study adopts this perspective and investigates the role of -and interactions with- the institutions and mechanisms of general international law in the negotiation, operation, verification and enforcement of arms control agreements. The general jurisprudential thesis of the study is that, being part of and subject to general international law, the law of arms control cannot provide a technical guarantee against the occurrence of wars. This is because the weakness of general international law itself is not due to technical reasons: International law is a function of the political community of nations, the defects of which are due to the embryonic character of the community in which it functions, not due to its technical shortcomings. International law after more than four centuries of systematized experience cannot claim to have found an effective and consistently reliable anti-dote against determined aggressors or violators ultimately outside that of self-help. Arms control negotiations and agreements mitigate the insecurity in which the States in the world arena find themselves as a result of this ultimately individual responsibility to self-preservation. If armaments are about deterrence, arms control is about reassurance, he stated, before he went on to an exhaustive study of the Conventional Forces in Europe Treaty and the Vienna Document on Confidence and Security Building Measures in Europe.

On Democratization in the Middle East

“The Debate on Democratization in the Broader Middle East”, which he co-authored with Mensur Akgun, Meliha Altunisik and Ayse Kadioglu, asserted that the suggestion that democracy can be created out of turmoil and chaos is fallacious. Democratization in the region should proceed ultimately with an eye to stability. This is not only a regional and global interest, but also a fundamental humanistic premise. The perceived contradiction between progress and stability is avoidable and can be overcome by sound and consistent policy and adherence to fundamental international norms by both the regional and extra-regional powers. Legitimacy and moral high ground must be preserved in order to remain a credible advocate for change. Democratization should be supported via benchmarking which can be defined through criteria that a country is expected to meet.

The authors believed that the Turkish experience in the process of adoption and harmonization to the Copenhagen political criteria of the European Union is a case that successfully portrays this method. The paper also argued that democracy is in fact about the striking of a modus vivendi between the processes of institutionalization and participation. Participation prior to institutionalization does not necessarily lead to democracy. Institutionalization and participation should co-exist. The establishment of constitutional liberties is the sine qua non of liberal democracy. In cases where political participation via elections takes place prior to the establishment of such liberties, illiberal democracy would be the outcome. Such a view may be disillusioning for impatient demands from below for democratization. Nevertheless, it contains viable “transitional” suggestions for the region in achieving sustainable democracy. Yet, rather than emphasizing a dilemma and a necessity of establishing sequences between institutionalization and participation, one should focus on the coexistence of these two dimensions of the democratization processes. The parameters of this coexistence would differ from one society to another. Universal democratic minimums involve the achievement and securing of constitutional liberties via institutionalization, the functioning of free and competitive elections as well as the establishment of functioning channels between civil societal organizations and political parties. In order for such waves prompted by civil societal organizations to lead to a democratic disclosure, there has to be a functioning political realm. A functioning political realm refers to a strong parliament with effective political parties. What is significant in the Middle East is not necessarily the establishment of more civil society organizations but rather the strengthening of the channels of communication between civil society and the parliament. Consequently, democratization initiatives in the region should strengthen the parliament while lending credence to civil society.

Against this background, Akçapar and the co-authors maintained that the key to democratization in the region is to ensure that it is not imposed. It can nevertheless be “encouraged” from outside. Democratization needs of every country in the region are different. Therefore, the goal of a democratization project should not be imposed from above, but should opt for opening up the channels that would allow people to tailor the projects that are congenial in their particular contexts.

IR Theory and Global Systemic Change

In 2009, Portland State University published Dr. Akçapar's paper on IR theory entitled "The Mutual Existence of Nascent and Senescent of World Order", which has set out a theoretical model to identify and chart change in international system. The model suggested 10 hypotheses which Dr. Akçapar believed would delineate and determine change in how the international society organized and interacted. Accordingly:

- Any international order reflects the global political and economic architecture which in turn is a codification permitted by a given period's circumstances.
- As such, a world order is not a novel creation but an arrangement that is naturally selected from among the already extant options.
- The next order will be carrying the genes of its predecessor complete with several flaws that pass from generation to generation.

World orders tend to be defined through the continuing interests of their dominant powers, with later world orders tending to rectify the structural flaws of former systems. A world order encompasses simultaneous economic, political, and military spheres functioning on a global and regional level. World orders, in the past, have not tended to be fully universal, although there have been clear trends in the history of world orders to include more regions under its regulatory control. Furthermore, the influence of world orders differs according to the distance from the centers of the world order of individual states.
