= Fırat Sunel =

Turkish diplomat and ambassador

Ambassador of the Republic of Turkey to India, Nepal, Maldives and Bhutan
- Incumbent
- Assumed office July 2021
- President: Recep Tayyip Erdoğan
- Preceded by: Şakir Özkan Torunlar

Personal details
- Born: 21 February 1966 Ödemiş
- Education: Istanbul University

Fırat Sunel (born 1966) is a Turkish diplomat who serves as Ambassador to India. He was also the first-ever Turkish Envoy to Eritrea. He is also a published author with three books, one of which was adapted into a TV series.

== Personal life ==
Sunel is married and has two children.

== Education ==
He graduated from Istanbul University with a degree in law. He obrained an LLM from Bochum Ruhr University in Germany.

== Career ==
Sunel has served at various diplomatic missions before his appointment to India as Ambassador.

- Consul General of Turkey in Düsseldorf (2009-2013)
- Founding Ambassador of the Republic of Turkey in Asmara (2013)
- Founding Ambassador of the Republic of Turkey in Eritrea (2016)
- Director General for Legal Affairs and Primary Legal Advisor at the Ministry of Foreign Affairs (2016-2021)

Fırat Sunel was appointed as Ambassador to India in May 2021. He also serves as Ambassador of Turkey to Nepal, Maldives and Bhutan.
