= Maghar Mahotsav =

Festival in Uttar Pradesh, India

- Locations: Maghar, Sant Kabir Nagar District, Uttar Pradesh, India

The Maghar Mahotsav is an annual cultural festival, held in Maghar, Uttar Pradesh, India in memory of Kabir, a saint. It is held every year in January. Mahotsav is organized in collaboration with the Department of Tourism (UP), Department of Culture (UP) and District Administration of Sant Kabir Nagar.

== History ==
History of the festival dates back to 1937, when Kabir Nirvan Mela was organized by Raees Jaggulal Srivastava. Later in 1955–56, local Businessmen of Khalilabad organized two days fair, with help of donations from citizens. Freedom Fighters Mazid Ali, Jagannath Prasad, Munshi Shiv Prasad Gupta and then manager of Gandhi Ashram Pandit Ramnath Chaubey and two others started the initiative for same. In 1987, a cricket competition was organized and then Khalilabad SDM Mr. R. C. P. Singh was chief guest. During discussions with him, local residents requested District Administration to organize it regularly. Later after discussion between him and then Basti District Magistrate Mr. Pankaj Agrawal, Kabir Mahotsav was organized in place of Kabir Nirvan Mela. At that time, Maghar was part of Basti District.

As part of Mahotsav various cultural activities viz. Kavi Sammelan, Bhajan, Folk Singing, Qawwali and sports events are organised. Also a fair is organised in which local and nearby merchants set up their stalls.

In 2012 and 2017 due to Assembly elections and in 2018 due to budget issue, Maghar Mahotsav was not organized. In 2022, due to Covid-19 pandemic, this event was not organized.

== Recent Editions ==
=== 2025 ===
The 2025 Maghar Mahotsav was organized during 28 January-3 February 2025.

=== 2024 ===
The 2024 Maghar Mahotsav was organized during 28 January-3 February 2024.

=== 2023 ===
The 2023 Maghar Mahotsav was organized during 7-9 February 2023.

=== 2021 ===
The 2021 Maghar Mahotsav was merged with Spiritual Saint Yatra & Kabir Utsav and organised between 23–25 February 2021.

=== 2020 ===
The 2020 Maghar Mahotsav was organized during 12–18 January 2020. Mahotsav was inaugurated by then Basti Divisional Commissioner Anil Sagar. Folk Singer Supriya Rawat and Model-Dancer Anshika Tyagi performed in Mahotsav.

=== 2019 ===
The 2019 Maghar Mahotsav was organized during 12–18 January 2019. Various Cultural programs including Kavi Sammelan and Mushaira were organized. Jawabi Birha was performed by Singers Nitu Chanchal and Upendra Lal Yadav.

=== 2016 ===
The 2016 Maghar Mahotsav was organized during 12–18 January 2016. Mahotsav was inaugurated by then Uttar Pradesh Minister of State for Food & Ration Laxmikant Nishad.

=== 2015 ===
The 2015 Maghar Mahotsav was organized during 12–18 January 2015.

== See also ==
- Kabir Jayanti
- Kabir Chaura
- Basti Mahotsav
- Gorakhpur Mahotsav
