= Gorakhpur Mahotsav =

Annual cultural festival in Gorakhpur, India

- Locations: Gorakhpur, Uttar Pradesh, India
- Website: gorakhpurmahotsav.co.in

The Gorakhpur Mahotsav, is an annual cultural festival, held in Gorakhpur, Uttar Pradesh, India. It is held every year in January. Since 2018, Mahotsav is organized in collaboration with the Department of Tourism (UP), Department of Culture (UP) and District Administration of Gorakhpur. Earlier editions were organized by District Administration of Gorakhpur.

== History ==
=== 1997 ===
Gorakhpur Mahotsav was organized for first time in 1997 with efforts of prominent local businessman and then advisor to UP Tourism Protul Kumar Lahiri. In book "Shaharnama Gorakhpur", writer Dr Ved Prakash Pandey has provided reference of souvenir book of Gorakhpur Mahotsav 1997.

=== 2001 ===
Gorakhpur Mahotsav was organized in January 2001 at Town Hall Field. A quiz show on the pattern of Kaun Banega Crorepati was also organized for students.

=== 2016 ===
After a gap of 15 years, in 2016 Gorakhpur Mahotsav was organized in Deen Dayal Upadhyay Gorakhpur University on initiative of then Divisional Commissioner Mr. P. Guruprasad during 29 January-1 February 2016. Mahotsav was inaugurated by Deen Dayal Upadhyay Gorakhpur University then Vice Chancellor Prof. Ashok Kumar and Inspector General H.R. Sharma.

=== 2018 ===
After a gap of two years, in 2018 Gorakhpur Mahotsav was organised between 11–13 January 2018. Venue for the inauguration and most of the cultural events was Deen Dayal Upadhyay Gorakhpur University. Singer Shaan and Shankar Mahadevan performed on day 1 and day 3 respectively. Mahotsav was inaugurated by then Uttar Pradesh Governor Ram Naik at University Campus on 11 January and closing ceremony was attended by Uttar Pradesh Chief Minister Yogi Adityanath at Smriti Bhavan in Gorakhnath Temple on 13 January.

Event/Performer	Venue
Mahotsav Inauguration, Debate (Hindi/English), Essay, Quiz, Chess Competitions, Science Fair	Various facilities at Deen Dayal Upadhyay Gorakhpur University
Badminton, Kabaddi, Volleyball	Regional Sports Stadium, Gorakhpur
Talent Hunt, Sabrang, Cultural Programs, Bhojpuri Night (Ravi Kishan, Malini Awasthi), Bollywood Night (Shaan, Shankar Mahadevan, Bhoomi Trivedi, Lalit Pandit, Anuradha Paudwal, Jimmy Joseph)	Main Stage, Deen Dayal Upadhyay Gorakhpur University
Bhajan (Anup Jalota, Anuradha Paudwal), Prize distribution, Closing Ceremony	Smriti Bhavan, Gorakhnath Temple

=== 2019 ===
In 2019 Gorakhpur Mahotsav was organized between 11–13 January 2019. Venue for the event was same as 2018, Deen Dayal Upadhyay Gorakhpur University.

Event/Performer	Venue
Mahotsav Inauguration	Deen Dayal Upadhyay Gorakhpur University
Cultural Programs, Bhojpuri Night, Bollywood Night (Sukhwinder Singh, Mohit Chauhan)	Main Stage, Deen Dayal Upadhyay Gorakhpur University
Prize distribution, Closing Ceremony	Smriti Bhavan, Gorakhnath Temple

=== 2020 ===
The 2020 Gorakhpur Mahotsav was organized between 11–14 January 2020. Originally it was scheduled for 11–13 January 2020, but due to national mourning observation after death of Sultan of Oman Qaboos bin Said all programs for 13th postponed to 14 January. Mahotsav was inaugurated by Uttar Pradesh Governor Anandiben Patel and closing ceremony was attended by Uttar Pradesh Chief Minister Yogi Adityanath. On the sidelines, Shilp Mela (eng. Crafts Fair) was also organized between 11–17 January showcasing local folk dances and artisans.

Event/Performer	Venue
Mahotsav Inauguration, Debate (Hindi/English), Essay, Quiz, Chess Competitions, Science Fair	Various facilities at Deen Dayal Upadhyay Gorakhpur University
Badminton, Kabaddi, Volleyball, Half Marathon(Men/Women)	Regional Sports Stadium, Gorakhpur
Dog Show	Sports Ground, Deen Dayal Upadhyay Gorakhpur University
Talent Hunt, Sabrang, Cultural Programs, Bhojpuri Night, Bollywood Night	Main Stage, Deen Dayal Upadhyay Gorakhpur University
Khadi Fashion Show (Showstopper - Miss Globe 2016 Dimple Patel)	Main Stage, Deen Dayal Upadhyay Gorakhpur University
Bhajan Sandhya (Anuradha Paudwal), Prize distribution, Closing Ceremony	Smriti Bhavan, Gorakhnath Temple

Singer Sonu Nigam was supposed to perform on 13 January, but his event was postponed to 14 January. Later he withdrawn from performance and did not return his fees (4 millions INR) with GST. After a discussion with organizing committee, he agreed to perform in Gorakhpur Mahotsav 2022 under same fees.

=== 2021 ===
The 2021 Gorakhpur Mahotsav was organized on 12–13 January 2021. Due to COVID-19 pandemic Mahotsav was of two days duration, instead of three. Mahotsav was inaugurated by Uttar Pradesh Tourism Minister Neelkanth Tiwari on 12th and Uttar Pradesh Chief Minister Yogi Adityanath was chief guest in closing ceremony on 13th. This year venue of opening and closing ceremony was changed to Champa Devi Park near Ramgarh Tal Lake. Live telecast of Mahotsav was broadcast on LED screens at Shastri Chowk, Kutchery square, Mohaddipur square and Ramgarh Tal and also online through Mahotsav's website. As part of Mahotsav Dog Show was organized in Mahant Digvijaynath Park on day 1. Singer Maithili Thakur performed on day 2 of Mahotsav. A live exhibition on Guru Gorakhnath, Swami Vivekanand, Mahatma Gandhi and famous personalities of Poorvanchal region was organized between 12–16 January at Champa Devi Park, along with Agriculture, Garden, Book & Saras Fair and Science Exhibition.

During closing ceremony 'Gorakhpur Ratna' awards were distributed to talents from different walks of life. Awardee includes Singer Nandu Mishra (Art), Dr Sanjeev Gulati (Social Service), Dr Narendra Mohan Seth (Health), Dr Ram Chet Chaudhary (Agricultural Science), Jyoti Maskara (Business), S.M. Ali Saeed, Prem Maya (Sports), Prof. Dr. Meenakshi Narain (Science) and Amarnath Yadav (Wrestling). Motorized tricycles were distributed to 100 handicapped persons.

Event/Performer	Venue
Mahotsav Inauguration, Prize distribution, Closing Ceremony	Champa Devi Park, Ramgarh Tal, Gorakhpur
Badminton, Wrestling, Kabbadi, Football, Kho-kho, Table Tennis, Divyang Tricycle race	Regional Sports Stadium, Gorakhpur
Chess	RPM Academy, Green City, Gorakhnath, Gorakhpur
Agriculture, Garden, Book and Saras Fair, Science Exhibition (12-16 January 2021)	Champa Devi Park, Ramgarh Tal, Gorakhpur
Dog Show, Hot Air Ballooning	Mahant Digvijaynath Park, Gorakhpur
February 4, 1922 (Play on Chauri Chaura incident by Abhiyan Theatre Group), Sanju Raj Khan (Satya Sarathi Santha), Videshiya (Play on Bhikhari Thakur's story by Bhojpuri Association of India), Play by Malay Mishra	Mukta Kashi Manch, Taramandal, Gorakhpur
Program on readymade garments	Udyog Bhavan, GIDA, Gorakhpur
Discussion on Guru Gorakhnath's life and philosophy, Seminar on Opportunities of Tourism in Gorakhpur region, Importance of Preventive care in Health Sector, Cow-preservation & self-dependent stockbreeder	Annexe Bhavan, Gorakhpur
Kavi Sammelan (Sunil Jogi, Dinesh Bawra, Vishnu Saxena, Akhilesh Kumar Mishra, Padmini Sharma, Gajendra Solanki, Rohit Sharma, Chandra Prakash Agrawal), Cultural Programs, Sabrang, Singing (Maithili Thakur, Dr Pratibha, Akash Dubey), Bhajan (Kishor Chaturvedi, Swati)	Champa Devi Park, Ramgarh Tal, Gorakhpur
Kathak (Anushree Banerjee, Maryada Kulshrestha), Badhai, Faruahi, Ghoomar, Panihari & Naurata Dance	Champa Devi Park, Ramgarh Tal, Gorakhpur
Khadi Fashion Show (Showstopper - Miss Globe 2016 Dimple Patel)	Champa Devi Park, Ramgarh Tal, Gorakhpur
Dumroo Vadan (Kashi Vishwnath Dumroo Group, Varanasi)	Champa Devi Park, Ramgarh Tal, Gorakhpur
Bird Watch, Nature Walk, Stamp and Wildlife photo exhibition (Organized by Heritage Foundation, Forest Department Gorakhpur and Shaheed Ashfaq Ullah Khan Prani Udyan Gorakhpur)	Ramgarh Tal Lake, Shaheed Ashfaq Ullah Khan Prani Udyan
Nukkad Natak (Street Play) by Youth Power Association	Various places in Gorakhpur city

=== 2022 ===
Gorakhpur Mahotsav was organized during 11-12 January 2022

Host: Harsh Kumar (for Talent Hunt, Bhojpuri Night, Award Show)

=== 2023 ===
Gorakhpur Mahotsav was organized during 11-13 January 2023. It was inaugurated by State Tourism Minister.

Host: Harsh Kumar (for Talent Hunt, Bhojpuri Night, Award Show)

=== 2026 ===
The 2026 edition of Gorakhpur Mahotsav was held from 11 January to 17 January 2026 at Champa Devi Park, Gorakhpur, Uttar Pradesh. The seven-day cultural festival aimed to promote the cultural heritage, tourism, local art, cuisine, and businesses of the Purvanchal region.

The inaugural ceremony was attended by Uttar Pradesh Tourism Minister Jaiveer Singh as the chief guest, along with actor and Member of Parliament Ravi Kishan. The event featured cultural performances, exhibitions, food festivals, literary activities, and competitions for students, women, and local artists.

Several popular artists performed during the festival. Bhojpuri singer Pawan Singh performed on 13 January 2026; however, his show witnessed overcrowding, leading to a police lathi charge and minor injuries to some attendees.

Rapper and music composer Badshah also performed during the Bollywood Night segment of the Mahotsav and met Chief Minister Yogi Adityanath during his visit to Gorakhpur.

The 2026 edition received wide media coverage for its scale, crowd participation, and role in promoting regional culture, tourism, and local entrepreneurship in eastern Uttar Pradesh.

== See also ==
- Maghar Mahotsav
- Basti Mahotsav
