= Nawab Wajid Ali Shah Prani Udyan =

Lucknow Zoo (Nawab Wajid Ali Shah Zoological Garden)
- Interactive map of Lucknow Zoo (Nawab Wajid Ali Shah Zoological Garden)
- 26.84607°N 80.95463°E
- Date opened: 1921; 105 years ago
- Location: Lucknow, Uttar Pradesh, India
- Land area: 71.6 acres (29.0 ha)
- No. of animals: 911
- No. of species: 102
- Annual visitors: 1,156,267+
- Memberships: CZA
- Website: www.lucknowzoo.com

Nawab Wajid Ali Shah Prani Udyan, formerly known as Prince of Wales Zoological Gardens and now popularly known as Lucknow Zoological Garden (Urdu: Lakhnaū Chiṛiyāghara), or Banaarsi Baag, is a 71.6-acre (29.0 ha) zoo located in the heart of the capital city of Uttar Pradesh named after Wajid Ali Shah, the last Nawab of Awadh. According to the Central Zoo Authority of India, it is a large zoo. The Prince of Wales Zoological Gardens was established in the year 1921 to commemorate the visit of the Prince of Wales, later King Edward VIII, to Lucknow. The idea of establishing zoological gardens in Lucknow came from Sir Harcourt Butler, the Governor of the State.

== History ==
The Uttar Pradesh government changed the name from "Prince of Wales Zoological Gardens" to "Lucknow Prani Udyan" in June 2021.

== Management ==
The zoo is managed as a trust by the Zoo Advisory Committee, with Forest Secretary to the Govt. of Uttar Pradesh as Chairman, Principal Chief Conservator of Forests, Uttar Pradesh as Vice Chairman and Chief Wildlife Warden, Uttar Pradesh as Administrator. An officer of the rank of Deputy Conservator of Forests is posted as Director for over all day-to-day management of the zoo. In 2012, there was a proposition to start a cell-bank or a 'frozen zoo' for the conservation of endangered species. The proposal is still under consideration.

== Collections ==
The zoo's collections include:

=== Animals ===
Common leopard, nile hippo, blackbuck, albino blackbuck, hog deer, barking deer, swamp deer, spotted deer, sambar deer, somalia giraffe, asiatic lioness, common grey langur, bonnet monkey, lion-tailed monkey, female chimpanzee, indian grey wolf, golden jackal, bengal tiger, white tiger, sloth bear, leopard cat, fishing cat, jungle cat, indian gazelle, indian crested porcupine and Indian palm squirrels. Quarantined animals include asiatic lion, striped hyena and Grant's zebra. Deceased animals which are no longer present include elephant, rhinoceros, and hoolock gibbon.

Elephant-indira summit jaimala shanti was removed from zoo since 2010 and summit died on 29th of July 2010 in dudhwa tiger reserve.

There was a rhinoceros named Lohit, but Lohit died on Friday 2 February 2018's night 11 PM by brief-illness he left eating food and drinking water and his primary diet was chopped carrots, sugarcane juice, hay and green fresh grasses Hoolock Gibbon-there was a hukku monkey named shyam well known as kalu died on 18 October 2019 by old age and he was about 38 brought from dehradun's malsi deer park Olive Baboon-bought in 2012 but there removal is mystery Japanese Monkey-Home to 1 pair of Japanese monkeys in past but they're vanished Indian gazelles-in 2013 there tribe died by flu in sep-oct 2013

=== Birds ===
Himalayan griffon, red green macaw, blue golden macaw, ringneck parrot, silver pheasant, golden pheasant, hill myna, black swan, albino peafowl, red jungle fowl, lovebird, plum headed parrot, yellow parrot, budgies, cockatiel, emu, African grey parrot, black necked stork, sarus crane, rosy pelican and painted storks. Ostriches previously held in the zoo have died. A female ostrich brought from Chennai died on Saturday 5th of August 2023.

=== Fish ===
Starfish, parrotfish, tiger barb, alligator gar, black tiger shark, albino tiger shark, angelfish, widowfish and goldfish.

== Other features ==
=== Toy Train ===
A toy train was started in 1969. The rolling stock, consisting of engine and two coaches, was the gift of Railway Board. The train was inaugurated on the Children's Day 14 November 1969 by the then Chief Minister of Uttar Pradesh, Chandra Bhanu Gupta. The track is 1.5 kilometres (0.93 mi) long and has crossings and signals. Rides start from Chandrapuri station and travel to almost every section of the zoo.

The glorious chapter in Lucknow’s history came to an end on Wednesday, 21 November 2013 as the journey of the ‘toy train’ that chugged in the city zoo for the last four decades, came to a halt. The 44-year–old toy train, that carried lakhs on it, was pulled out of service owing to plans of a revamp. The toy train has been parked in front of the state museum in the zoo premises.

The New Toy Train, inaugurated by the Chief Minister of Uttar Pradesh, Akhilesh Yadav

A new ‘Shatabdi–look–alike’ four–bogey toy train made by a Noida-based company started operating in the zoo premises on 28 February 2014. The new track alignment laid from 22 November 2013 onwards ensured that the new train could cover maximum sightseeing areas of the zoo.

=== Vintage train ===
A British-era train will be an added attraction for visitors to the city zoo. The train was shifted to the zoo from Maharajganj, where it was lying almost discarded. The train belongs to 1924-period and was mainly used for transportation of timber between Ikma and Chauraha over a track of 22.4 kilometres (13.9 mi). In 1978 it was brought over to the forest department for use but being an uneconomical option, it was decided in 1981 that it would be phased out.

=== State Museum, Lucknow ===
The Uttar Pradesh State Museum in Lucknow, earlier situated in the Chattar Manzil and the Lal Baradari, was shifted to a new building in the Lucknow Zoo in 1963. The initial collection centered around the arts of Avadh and objects related to the customs, habits, mythology and contemporary objects of Awadh, but later on, it was expanded to more interesting, excavated antiquities from nearby places of Lucknow, particularly from Kapilavastu where Buddha grew up.

Today, the Museum has become a centre of Lucknow's (Awadh's) sculpture, bronzes, paintings, natural history and anthropological specimens, coins, textiles and decorative arts. The (1000 BC) Egyptian Mummy and wooden sarcophagus in the Prince of Wales Zoological Garden (Lucknow Zoo) are a centre of attraction. From the vast number of displayed objects, some hundred are rare and of great value. These include an inscribed wine jar bearing the name of Aurangzeb Alamgir (17th century), a jade chamakali with the name Jahangir and the date 1036 AD, a 16th-century painting of a scene from the Kalpasutra, a 16th-century copy of the Harivansha in Persian with nine illustrations, rare silver and gold coins.

== See also ==
- 1971 Flood in Lucknow
- Etawah Safari Park
- Kanpur Zoological Park
- Shaheed Ashfaq Ullah Khan Prani Udyan
- Wajid Ali Shah
