= Basti Mahotsav =

Basti Mahitsav Festival in UP

- Locations: Basti, Uttar Pradesh, India

The Basti Mahotsav, is an annual cultural festival, held in Basti, Uttar Pradesh, India. It is held every year in January–February. Mahotsav is organized by District Administration of Basti.

== History ==
Basti Mahotsav was first organized in 2019, since then it is held every year in January–February.

=== 2023 ===
In 2023, Basti Mahotsav was organized during 3-5 March in Basti Club.

=== 2021 ===
The 2021 Basti Mahotsav was organised during 19-21 February 2021. Mahotsav's inauguration was performed by BJP Uttar Pradesh state president Swatantra Dev Singh. Speaker of the Lok Sabha Om Birla was chief guest on 20th. Actor-Politician Ravi Kishan, Singer Manoj Tiwari, Himanshu Saxena, Poet Anamika Ambar, Sunil Jogi and comedian Sunil Pal performed in Mahotsav. All programs were organised in Atal Bihari Vajpayee Auditorium.

=== 2020 ===
The 2020 Basti Mahotsav was organized during 28 January - 1 February 2020. Mahotsav was inaugurated by Uttar Pradesh Legislative Assembly Speaker Hriday Narayan Dikshit on 28th. Various artists like Anup Jalota, Maithili Thakur, Brijesh Shandilya, Penaz Masani and Kumar Vishwas performed in this Mahotsav. Venue of the event was Government Inter College, Kateshwar Pur, Basti.

=== 2019 ===
The 2019 Basti Mahotsav was organized during 28 January - 1 February 2019. Venue of the event was Government Inter College, Kateshwar Pur, Basti.

== See also ==
- Maghar Mahotsav
- Gorakhpur Mahotsav
