= Kabir panth =

Vaishnava Hindu sect

Kabir Panth
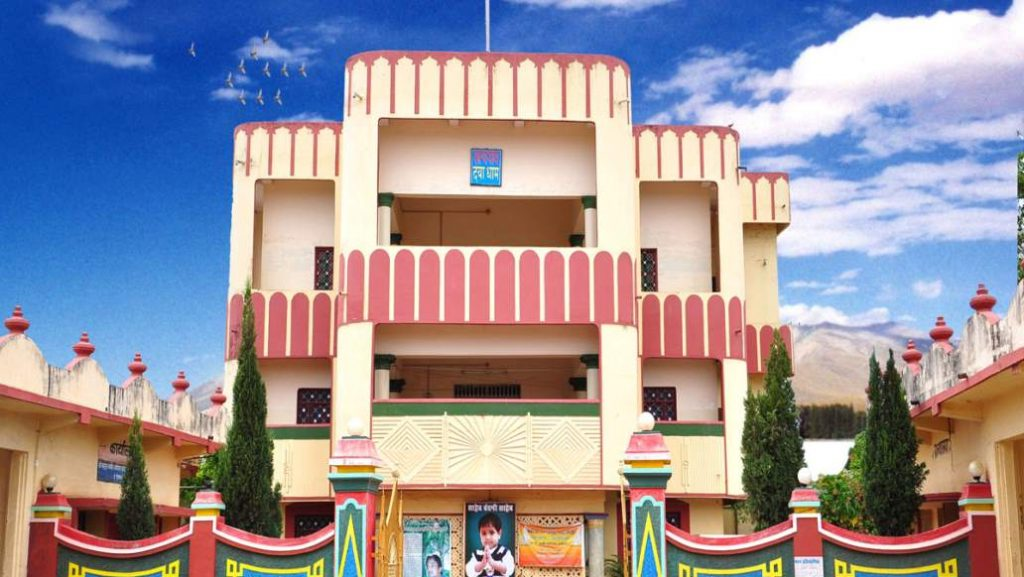
- A prominent pilgrimage site of Kabirpanth — Kabir Dharmanagar, Damakheda

Founder
- Kabir

Regions with significant populations
- Indian subcontinent • Caribbean • Oceania

Religions
- Sant Mat

Scriptures
- Bijak among others

Kabir Panth is a Sant tradition based on the teachings of the 15th-century mystic poet Kabir. It emphasizes devotion to a formless God, equality, and rejection of ritualism and social divisions. The followers of Kabir Panth are spread across India and abroad, and their population is generally considered to be in the millions.

Kabir Panth (transl. Path of Kabir) is a Sant Mat denomination and philosophy based on the teachings of the 15th century saint and poet, Kabir. It is based on devotion to him as one guru as a means to salvation. The adherents of Kabir Panth are from many religious backgrounds as Kabir never advocated change of religions but highlighted their limitations. According to some scholars, this tradition belongs to the Hindu denomination of Vaishnavism with Sufi and universalist leanings. In respect of Kabir, his followers celebrate Kabir Jayanti.

== History ==
=== Origin ===
Kabir and two Followers on a terrace, Mughal style, 17th century

Kabir did not found any distinct sect during his lifetime; however, after his death, two of his disciples, Dharamdas and Suratigopal, established centres (known as maṭh) for the propagation of his teachings. Among these, the lineage associated with Dhani Dharamdas Saheb is regarded as one of the traditions within Kabir Panth. According to traditional accounts, Kabir Saheb is believed to have blessed Dhani Dharamdas Saheb with the continuation of the lineage through forty-two generations (Bayalis Vansh). This lineage, commonly referred to as the Kabir Dharamdas Vanshavali, is associated with a Main guru seat (gaddi) within the Kabir Panth tradition.

==== Kabir Dharm Nagar Damakheda ====
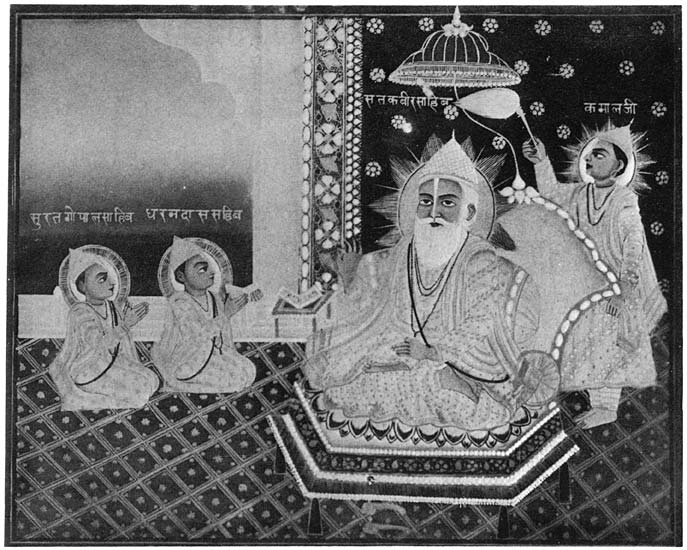
Painting of bhagat Kabir (seated near the centre of the frame), his son Kamal (fly-whisk attendant; standing to the right), and two of his disciples kneeling at the left, them namely being Surat Gopal (kneeling left) and Dharam Das (kneeling right). The artwork was located at the Kabir Chaura at Banaras (Varanasi)

Among its major branches, the lineage of Dhani Dharamdas is regarded as one of the most prominent. Dharamdas, a chief disciple of Kabir, played a central role in organizing and propagating the Kabir Panth tradition. this branch name is Kabir Dharmdas Vanshavali

According to tradition, Kabir blessed Dharamdas with the continuation of “forty-two lineages” (atal bayalis vansh), which became the basis of the Dharamdasi lineage system.

Dhani Dharamdas’ son, Chudamani (Muktamani) Nam Saheb, is regarded as the first lineage guru (Vanshguru) of this tradition.

The Kabir Dharm Nagar Damakheda (Dhamkhera) seat in present-day Chhattisgarh serves as a center of the Kabir Dharmdas Vanshavali branch of Kabir Panth.

According to records from the Indira Gandhi National Centre for the Arts, the Dharamdas lineage includes a structured succession of 42 lineages and acharyas, listing spiritual leaders from Muktamani Nam Saheb to currently acharyas such as Grindhmuni nam sahab Prakashmuni Naam Saheb and Udit Muni Naam Saheb .

== Kabir Dharamdas Vanshavali (Damakheda) – Vanshguru List ==
1. Chudamani (Muktamani) Naam Saheb – First Vansh Guru
2. Sudarshan Naam Saheb
3. Kulpati Naam Saheb
4. Pramod Guru Balapir Naam Saheb
5. Keval Naam Saheb
6. Amol Naam Saheb
7. Surati Sanehi Naam Saheb
8. Hakk Naam Saheb
9. Paak Naam Saheb
10. Pragat Naam Saheb
11. Dheeraj Naam Saheb
12. Ugra Naam Saheb
13. Daya Naam Saheb
14. Grindhmuni Naam Saheb
15. Prakashmuni Naam Sahab
16. Udit Muni Naam sahab(Present)

Dharamdas lineage guru would slightly later found the Damakheda maṭh (also known as māī meaning "mother) located in modern-day Chhattisgarh. It conducted missionary activities in central India and had branches located in Raipur, Bilaspur, and Chindawara.

=== Kabir Chaura ===
Surat Gopal first founded the Kabir Chaura maṭh (also known as bāp meaning "father") in Varanasi. It conducted missionary activities in Gujarat, Uttar Pradesh, and Bihar and had a branch located at Magahar.

== Practices and beliefs ==
Adherents must disavow polytheism, reject the consumption of alcohol, bathe daily whilst praising God, and maintain a strict vegetarian diet. They should allow those who sin against them up to three chances of forgiveness. Kabirpanthis greet with the phrase Bandagī (meaning "salutation to you"). Furthermore, followers are instructed to avoid the company of women whom are ill-natured, never disavow their wife from their property, never tell a lie, never steal, never give false testimony against another person, and never negatively gossip about others.

Hindu Kabirpanthis recite the name Raam whilst Muslim Kabirpanthis use the name Khuda as an appellation for God. Lay Kabirpanthis are led by a mahant. A Kabirpanthi mahant is adorned in special garbs, such as a conical cap, a necklace known as a kanthi, a rosary of tulsi (sweet basil), and clothing that is white or brownish-red in colour. Mahants may have a tilak (frontal mark) of the Vaishnavite tradition. The frontal mark may also be a streak along the ridge of their nose using sandal or gopichandan paste. Mahants are not obliged to remain celibate and some marry.

Kabir Panthis can follow the ethical and social customs of the day according to tradition without hindrance. Lay persons can be cremated according to Hindu law and priests can be buried or cremated depending upon which tradition one wishes to follow. In the Caribbean and across North America, Kabir Panthis may opt for burning or burial.

Kabir Panthis observe sanctity and purity in their daily lives and behavior. The foundation of their belief and practice are

- Dharma, or "the natural Law of life",
- Satya, or "The primordial and eternal truth",
- Ahinsa, or "Non-violence towards all beings through word and deed",
- Bhakti, or "Devotional love for god and a higher spiritual reality",
- Sraddha, or "Faith and unswerving loyalty",
- Asteya, or "Neither hoarding nor coveting",
- Kshama, or "Forgiveness and patience",
- Daya, or "Compassion, mercy, and conquering feelings of cruelty and insensitivity towards all beings",
- Shaucha or "Purity in body, mind and speech",
- Aparigraha, or "Limiting possessions to what is necessary and being non-materialistic",
- Anekantvada, or "Acceptance of different beliefs and the multiplicity of viewpoints",
- Vishwa Bandhutva, or "The universal brotherhood of all beings" and
- Atma Gyan or "The awareness of ones true self, which is no different from the one true reality which pervades in everyone, thus making everyone the one and only true reality".

These basic set of guidelines gives Kabir Panthis an all-encompassing formula for Love, Humility, Compassion and Unity. A Kabir Panthi lay person is called a Bhakta and priests are addressed with the honorific title of Mahant. Spiritual leaders are called Acharya or Guru. Monks who are more ascetic in nature, who do not marry and engage in more severe spiritual pursuits while never living in one place, constantly moving from monastery to monastery are called Brahmachari Sadhus, whereas those monks who do marry, have children and live a more relaxed spiritual life are Grihasta Sadhus. Similarly, women who have chosen to be Nuns are called Sadhvis. God is called by an infinite array of names but some of the more common names are "Satya Purush", "Soham Sadguru", "Adi Guru Param Satyeshwar", or simply "Sadguru Kabir Saheb". During their religious ceremonies Kabir Panthis sing the songs, bhajans and Sakhis of Kabir to the music of cymbals, drums and other Indian instruments. The Guru recites various prayers and Mantras, all of which remind devotees to remember God in all that they do.

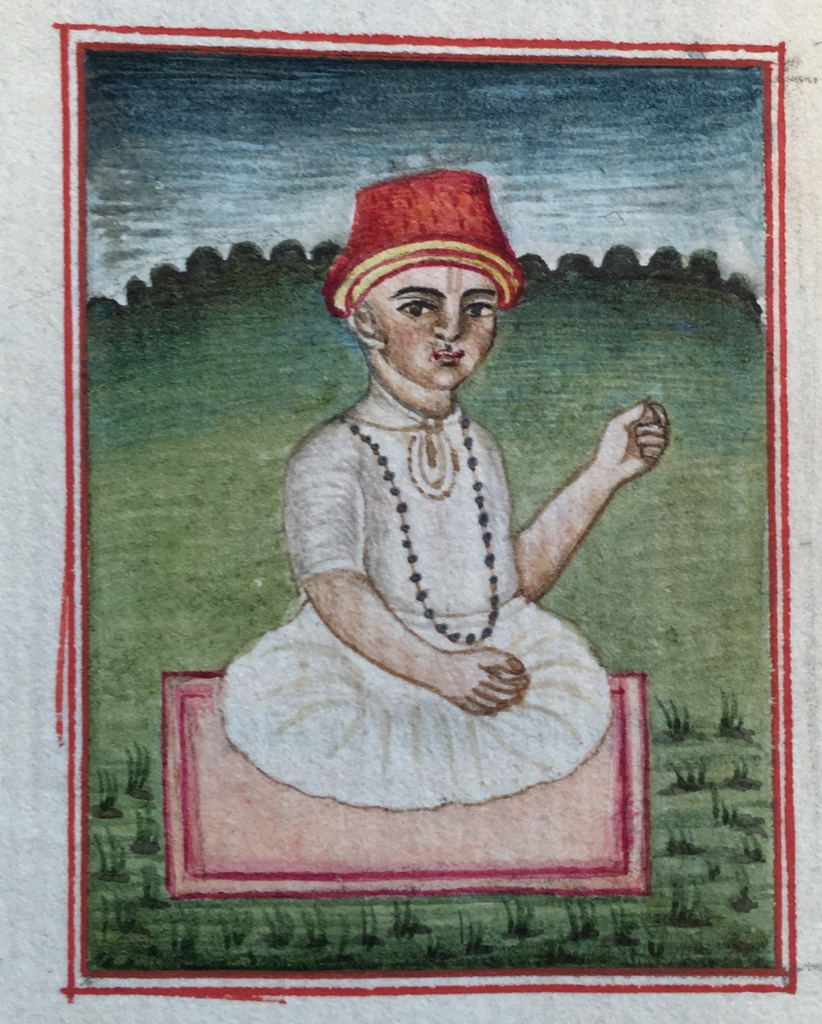
Painting of a Kabirpanthi from a folio of a manuscript of the Silsilah-i-Jogiyan, ca.1800

One's mind and body must be kept pure by contemplation and avoiding gross and complicated behaviour. Such practice will allow one to attain salvation while living no matter what ones religion or other personal endeavour may be. A mark of initiation into the Kabir Panth is given in the form of a Kanthi Mala. It is a necklace made from the sacred Tulsi wood beads, sacred to Vishnu. It is also made out of the holy Rudraksha stone beads, sacred to Shiva. It can also be made using a string with just one large Tulsi or Rudraksha bead. It is worn by choice and is typically given to one who has committed to avoiding lust, anger, greed, attachment to perishable things, and ego. Sahaja Yoga involves remembering God by repeating Satyanaam. Kabir Panthis believe in simplicity of life; simple food, clothing and belongings. One should only acquire what is needed for sustenance. Kabir Panthis are strictly vegetarian and avoid the use of alcohol, tobacco, and narcotics.

Separate organizations have formed over the years. One of the largest groups of Kabir Panthis outside India is in Trinidad and Tobago. Several smaller active groups exist outside of India as well, especially in Canada, Fiji, Guyana, Mauritius, Nepal, the Netherlands, Suriname, and the United States. The Kabir Panth Association in Trinidad and Tobago operates two primary schools and was one of the first non-Christian religious denominational schools founded in the region. Recently, other groups have been formed in Trinidad and Tobago [like Kabir Chaura Math, Satya Kabir Nidhi], each with their own emphasis on the teachings of Kabir and with their own affiliations in Trinidad and Tobago, India and elsewhere in the world.

Kabir panth includes the concept of satlok, which is equated with heaven. It is said that good devotees can go to the Satlok forever. Satlok is the place of Satpurush. It is situated beyond Trikuti. It is said that only initiated souls can reach Satlok. Satlok means the Loka (World) of Truth (Sat).

== Scriptures and literature ==
=== The Anurag Sagar & Bijak ===
The most sacred books of the Kabir Panth sect are the Anurag Sagar and Bijak, many passages from which are presented in the Guru Granth Sahib and the Anurag Sagar. In a blunt and uncompromising style, the Bijak exhorts its readers to shed their delusions, pretensions, and orthodoxies in favor of a direct experience of truth. It satirizes hypocrisy, greed, and violence, especially among the religious.

The Bijak includes three main sections (called Ramainī, Shabda and Sākhī) and a fourth section containing miscellaneous folksongs. Most of Kabir's material has been popularized through the song form known as Shabda (or pada) and through the aphoristic two-line sākhī (or doha) that serves throughout north India as a vehicle for popular wisdom. In the Anurag Sagar, the story of creation is told to Dharamdas (one of Kabir's disciples), and the Maan Sarowar is another collection of teachings of Kabir from the Dharamdasi branch of the Kabir panth.

=== Other works ===
- Anuraag Saagar
- Kabir Baani
- Kabir Granthaawalee
- Saakhi Granth
- Kabir Saagar
- Kabir Amrit Sandesh
- Sandhyaa Paath
- Guru Mahimaa

Some early works covering Kabir include the Kabīr Parcaī (ca. 1600) by Anantadās and the Bhaktamāl of Rāghavdās (1660 or 1720). Dharamdāsī sources present Kabir as the avatāra of the Satpurūṣa.

== Major centres ==
The centres of major branches of Kabir Panthis include:

- Kabir Dharamnagar Damakheda seat at Baloda Bazar-Bhatapara district on Raipur - Bilaspur, Chhattisgarh Highway (Dharamdas saheb ji lineage branch)
- Kabir Chaura based in Varanasi with a branch at Maghar;
- Biddupur seat founded by Jagu Sahib
- Dhanuati (Chhapra, Bihar) founded by Bhagvan Sahib, the scribe of Bijak;
- Chhattisgarh seat at Kudurmal, founded by Muktamani Sahib (Vikram Samvat 1570-1630). They belong to the line of Dharmadaas Saaheb;
- Kabir Parakh Sansthan, Preetam Nagar, Allahabad, Uttar Pradesh. Founded by Sri Abhilash Das on 1978.
- Shree Ram Kabir Bhakta Samaj of India, Shree Ramkabir Mandir Trust, and Shree Ramkabir Bhakta Samaj of USA. Founded many generations ago in Gujarat, this organization has grown to become a multi-national community with more than 12,000 members.

== Demographics ==
Kabirpanthi Julaha along with Megh caste in Punjab by Districts (2011)
Districts	2011 India census	
Districts	Kabirpanthi/Julaha/Megh Caste Population	%
Amritsar	31,792	1.28%
Barnala	308	0.05%
Bathinda	2700	0.19%
Faridkot	283	0.05%
Fatehgarh Sahib	954	0.16%
Firozpur	47,256	2.33%
Gurdaspur	48,554	2.11%
Hoshiarpur	8,676	0.55%
Jalandhar	44,381	2.03%
Kapurthala	2,508	0.31%
Ludhiana	11,991	0.34%
Mansa	331	0.04%
Moga	415	0.04%
Sri Muktsar Sahib	14,184	1.57%
Patiala	1,567	0.08%
Rupnagar	5,720	0.84%
Sahibzada Ajit Singh Nagar	2,275	0.23%
Sangrur	460	0.04%
Nawanshahr	1,234	0.2%
Tarn Taran	146	0.01%
