= Kanpur Zoological Park =

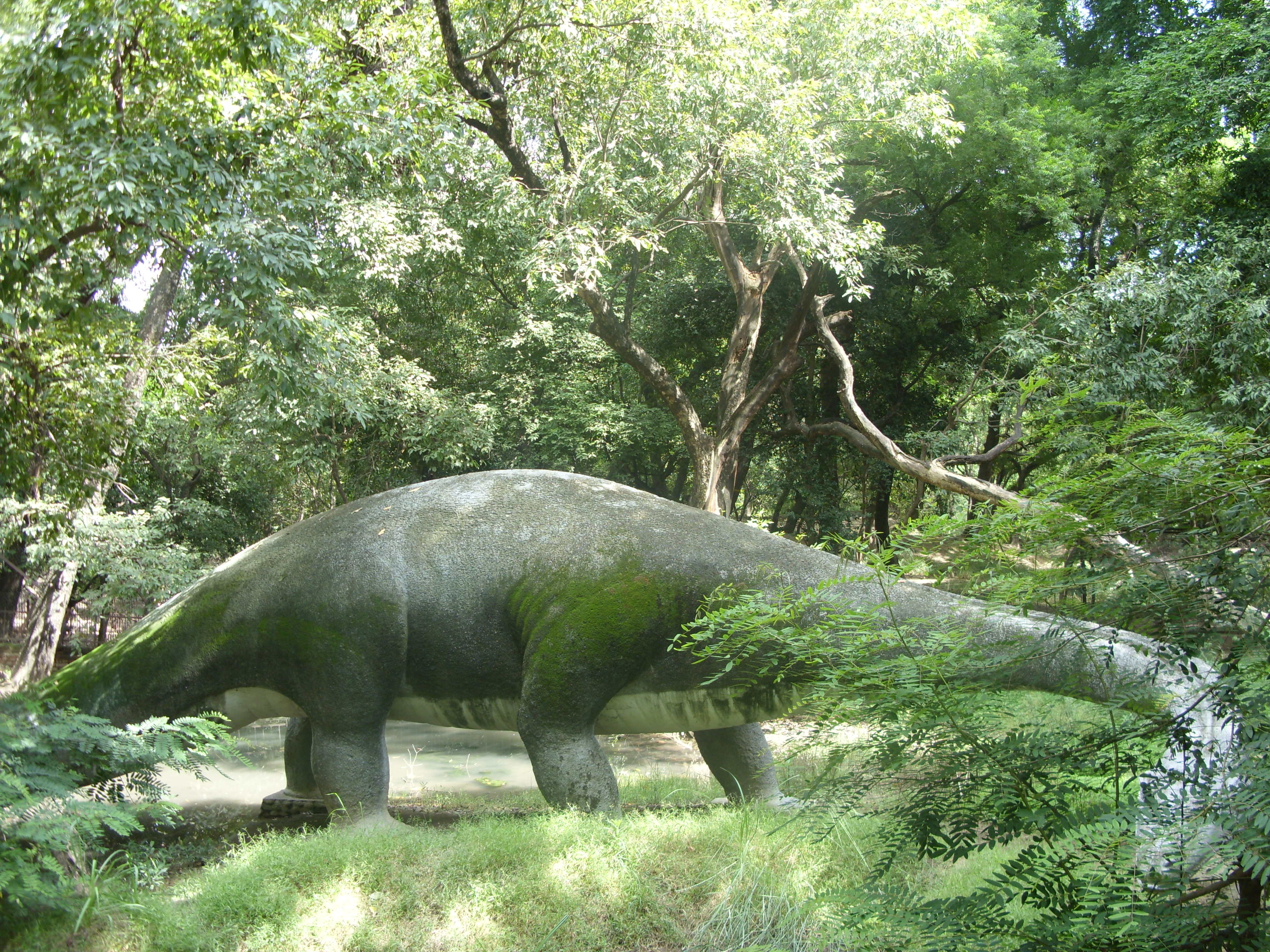
- Dinosaur Sculpture at Allen Forest Zoo
- Interactive map of Kanpur Zoological Park
- 26.5029234°N 80.303404°E
- Date opened: 4 February 1974
- Location: Zoo Entrance, Hastings Avenue, Azad Nagar, Nawabganj, Kanpur-02, Uttar Pradesh, India
- Land area: 110 ha (270 acres)
- No. of animals: 1400
- No. of species: 125
- Annual visitors: 8,00,000
- Memberships: CZA, Uttar Pradesh Zoological Society
- Major exhibits: Animals, Insects and Aquatic animals

Kanpur Zoological Park or Allen Forest Zoo (Hindi: कानपुर चिड़ियाघर / कानपुर प्राणी उद्यान), also called the Kanpur Zoo is a 110-hectare (270-acre) zoo in Kanpur, a large city in Northern India. It is the largest open green space in Kanpur and the largest zoological park in North India. Originally a natural habitat for fauna, it is one of the few zoos in India created in a natural forest. The animals inhabited in the Zoological Park have been put in open and moated enclosures. The moated enclosures give the animal ample space for movement and help in expressing their biological and physiological expressions.

In 2015, Kanpur Zoological Park added another feather in its cap, as it became a part of one of the handful of zoos in the country to receive an ISO certification of 14001:2004 for 'Environment Management System Standard’.

Kanpur Zoo vets, stuffed the void of a term to denominate a wild animal born in captivity, by amalgamating 'WILD' and 'DOMESTIC and coined 'WILDOMESTIC’. This has been widely recognised and accepted by wild lifers and print and electronic media. It has been recommended by all for inclusion in several dictionaries.

== Location and hours ==
The Allen Forest Zoo is located about seven kilometres (4.3 miles) from the city's centre. In earlier colonial records, it is mentioned as being close to Nawabganj, a locality in Kanpur. The zoo is an oasis of green, featuring a natural lake and ancient trees.

The zoo is open for visitors on all days from 9 am to 5:00 pm, except on Mondays. Two electric cars are available for a 50 mins ride. The smaller one is a three seater and the larger one is a seven seater. Their charges are ₹120 and ₹210 respectively. Plastic bags are strictly banned inside of the zoo, and water is provided in coolers instead of in plastic bottles. Water, snacks and ice cream is available in plenty. Sulabh Shauchalayas have provided hygienic washrooms and well maintained R.O. plants are too present. Residents of the city can go for their morning walks within the premises of the spacious compound and can get a monthly ticket made for that purpose.

Ticket rates for entry in the zoo are ₹70 for adults and ₹35 for 5 to 12 age group while the toy train costs ₹50 for adults and ₹25 for 5 to 12 age group.

== History ==
The Zoological Park in Kanpur, (earlier Cawnpore) was the brainchild of a botanist Sir Allen, a member of the British Indian Civil Service. Sir Allen wanted to open the zoo in a natural forest, but his plans were stuck in bureaucratic red-tape and did not materialize. The construction work of the zoo began in 1971 initiated and funded by the Forest Department of the Government of Uttar Pradesh.

Allen forest was developed during the British rule between the years 1913-1918 by George Berney Allen, a famous British industrialist of Kanpur on the banks of the river Ganga. The zoo was constructed from 1971-1975 under the supervision of an IFS officer Mr. R.S. Bhadauria who was the First Director of the zoo. The enclosures for animals and birds were designed on the latest trends in the field of zoo building technology, well spread along the lake on either side of a semicircular arterial road of about 9 km. length.

The first animal to arrive at the zoo was an otter caught by a fisherman from the Chambal River.

In 1975, the first appointed doctor of the zoo was Dr. Ashwani Kumar Tripathi, who graduated from the G. B. Pant University of Agriculture and Technology, College of Veterinary & Animal Sciences. Dr. Tripathi contributed to efforts in introducing modern technology to keep the animals healthy.

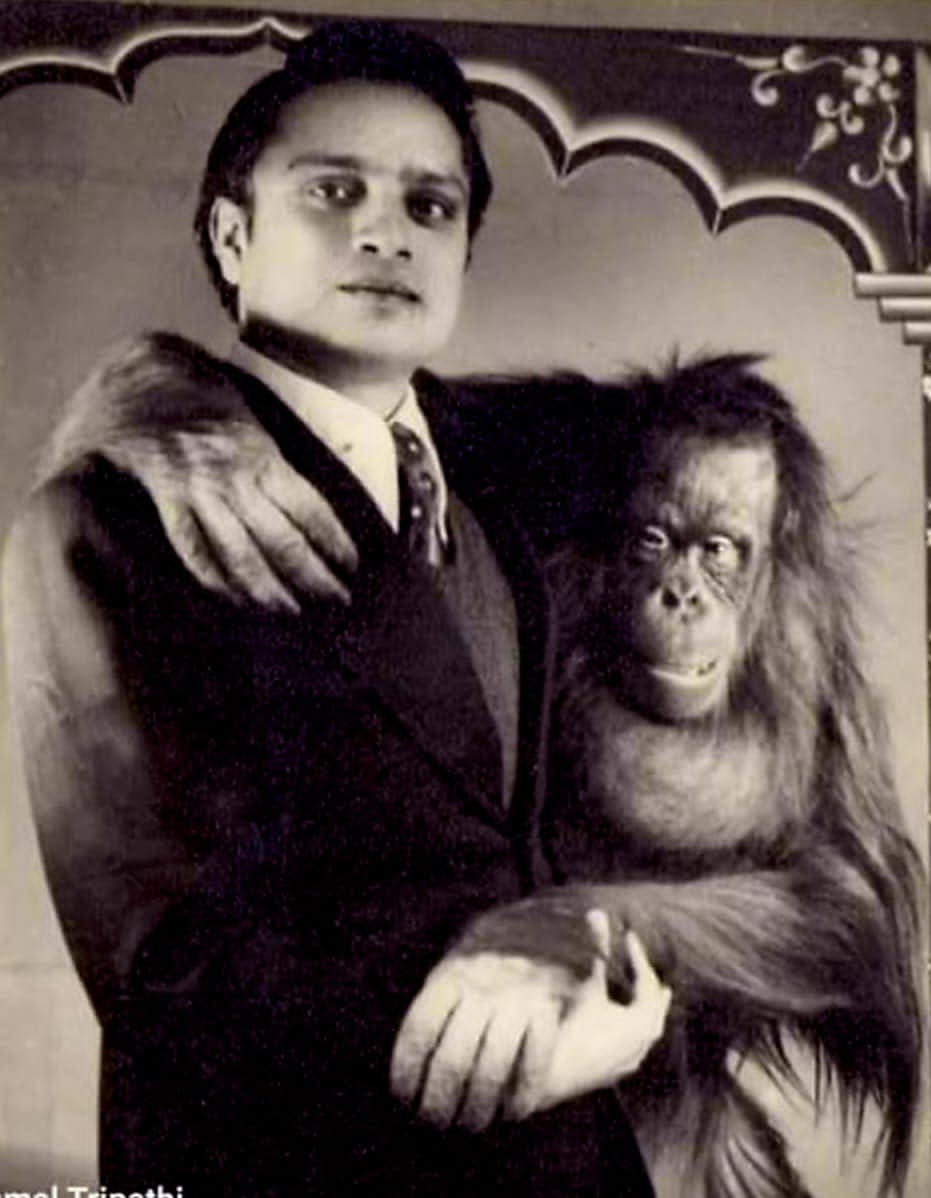
1975 Dr AK Tripathi with Dayang (there was article in Danik jagran - दयांग को प्यार ने पालतू बना दिया) Dr Ashwani Kumar Tripathi with lion cubs

The current director of the zoo is Mr. Krishna Kumar Singh (IFS)

== Animals ==
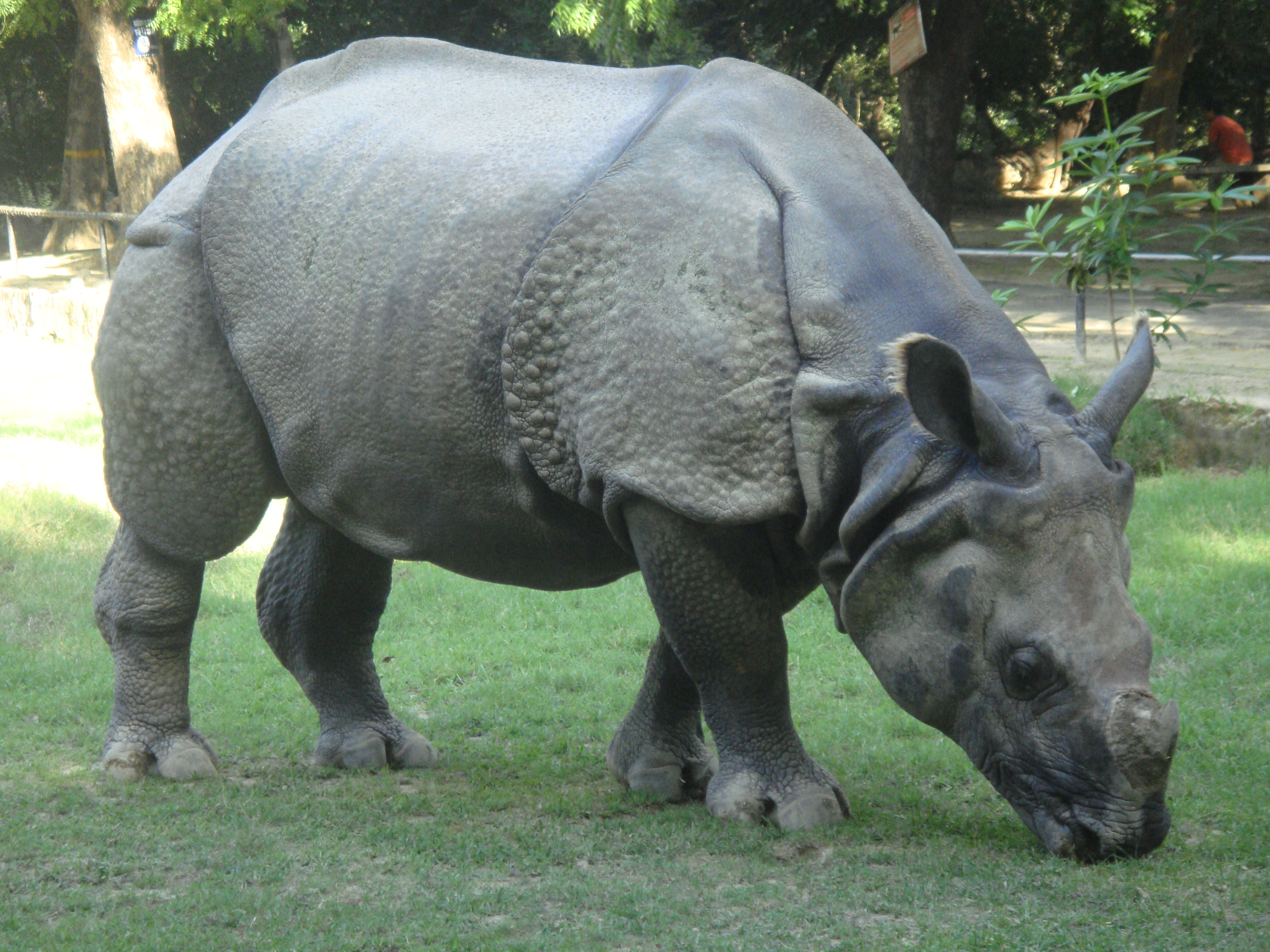
Rhinoceros at the zoo

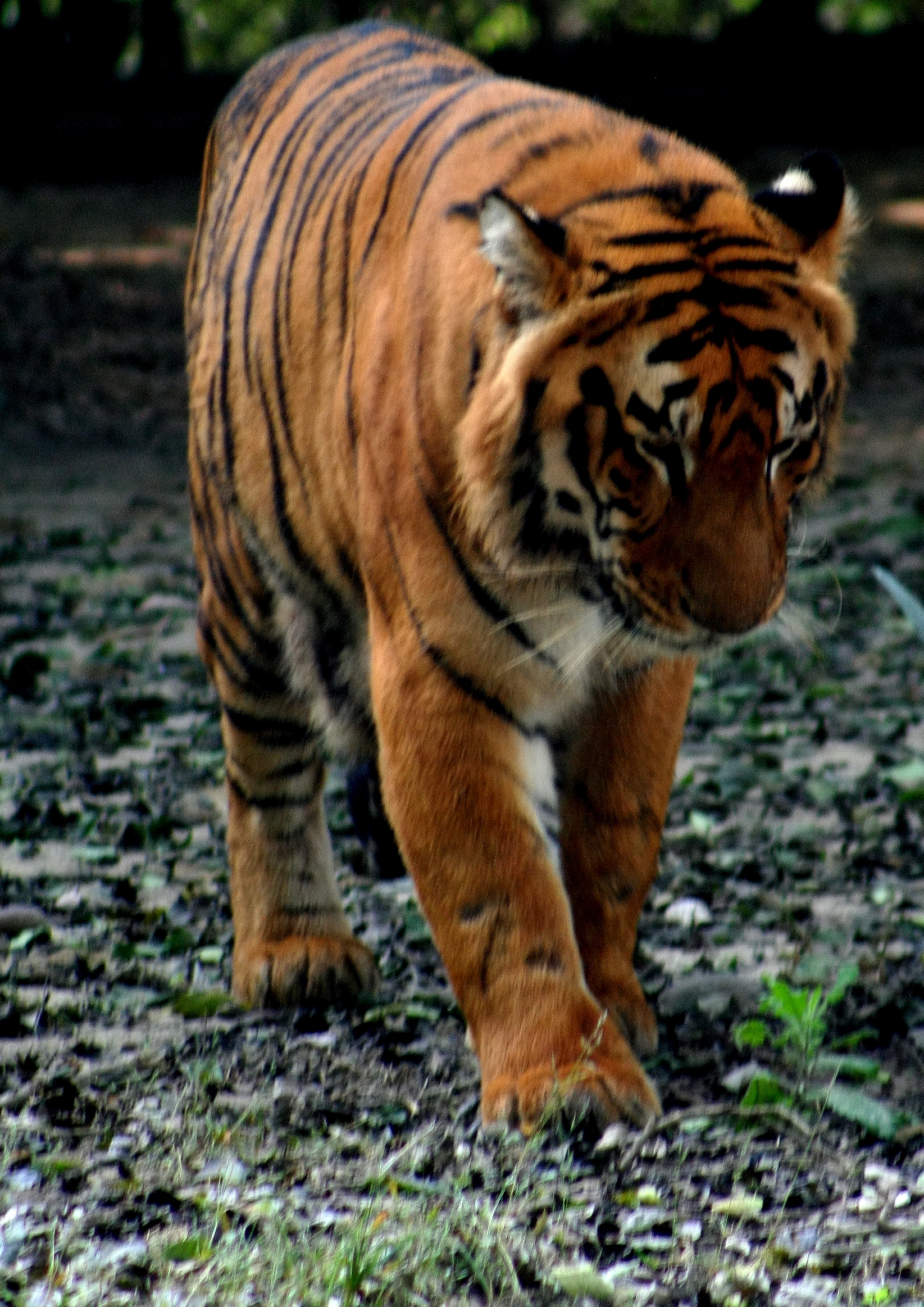
Tigress at the zoo

Mammals at the zoo include white tigers, leopard, hyena, black bear, grizzly bear, sloth, rhinoceros, hippopotamus, monkeys, langur, baboons, musk deer, deer, zebra, and antelope. chimpanzees (including a 26-year-old named Chhajju) and orangutans (including a 30-year-old named Mangal) have their own island. Some monkeys and deer are allowed to roam outside the enclosures as natural inhabitants of the zoo.

Reptiles at the zoo include Indian gharial.

The lion at the zoo died of an unknown disease during November 2010. On 11 December 2016, Nandini and her partner Ajay were brought to Kanpur zoo from Raipur zoo and allowed to mate. After three months of pregnancy, lioness littered two cubs, of which one survived.

The zoo also claims that it holds the record of world's oldest living Royal Bengal Tiger, guddu, who unfortunately succumbed to his failing vital health signs in late 2014 at the age of 26.

To feed the enormous number of its carnivorous inmates, Kanpur Zoo has a staggering consumption of 170 to 190 kilogram of meat per day.

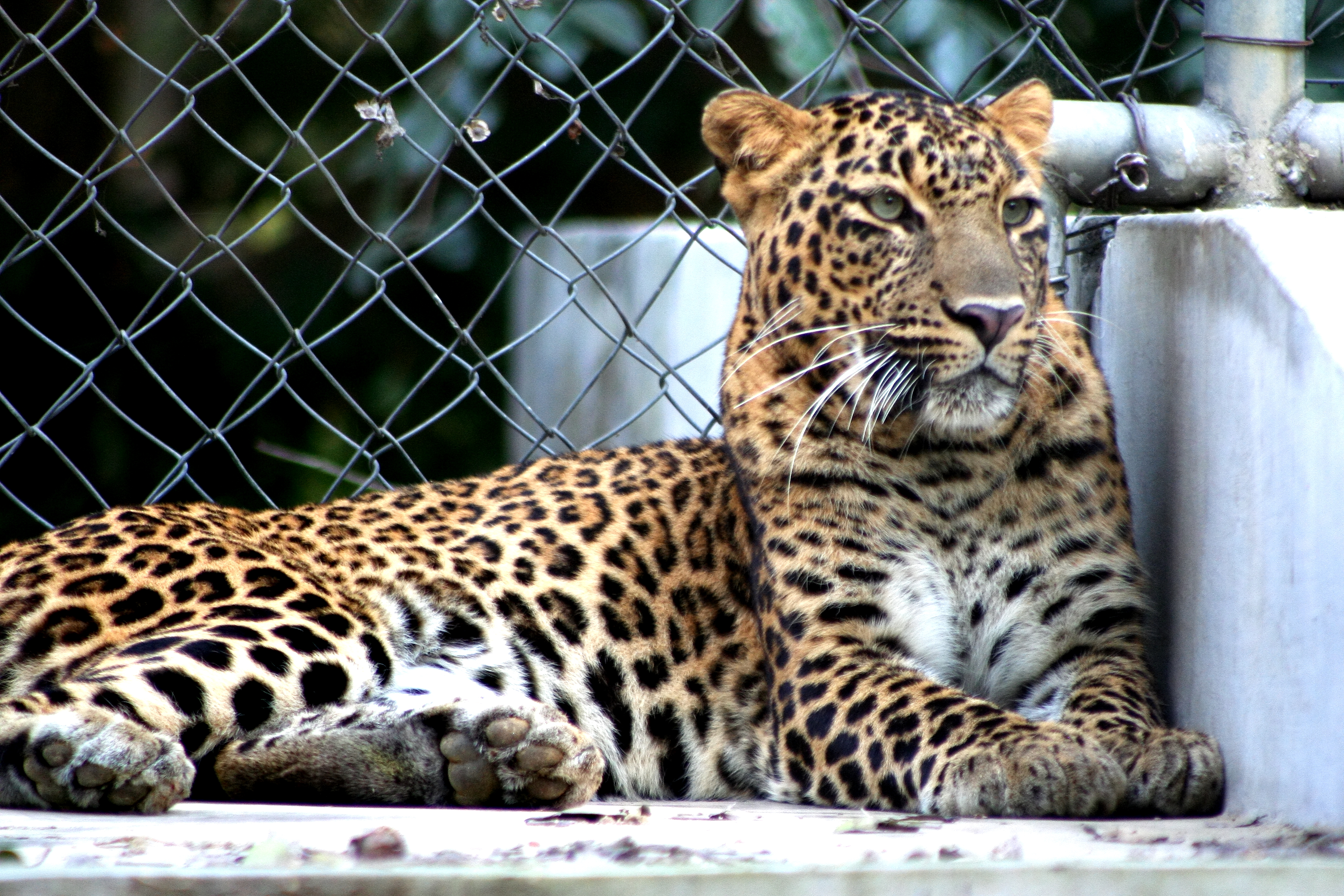
Leopard

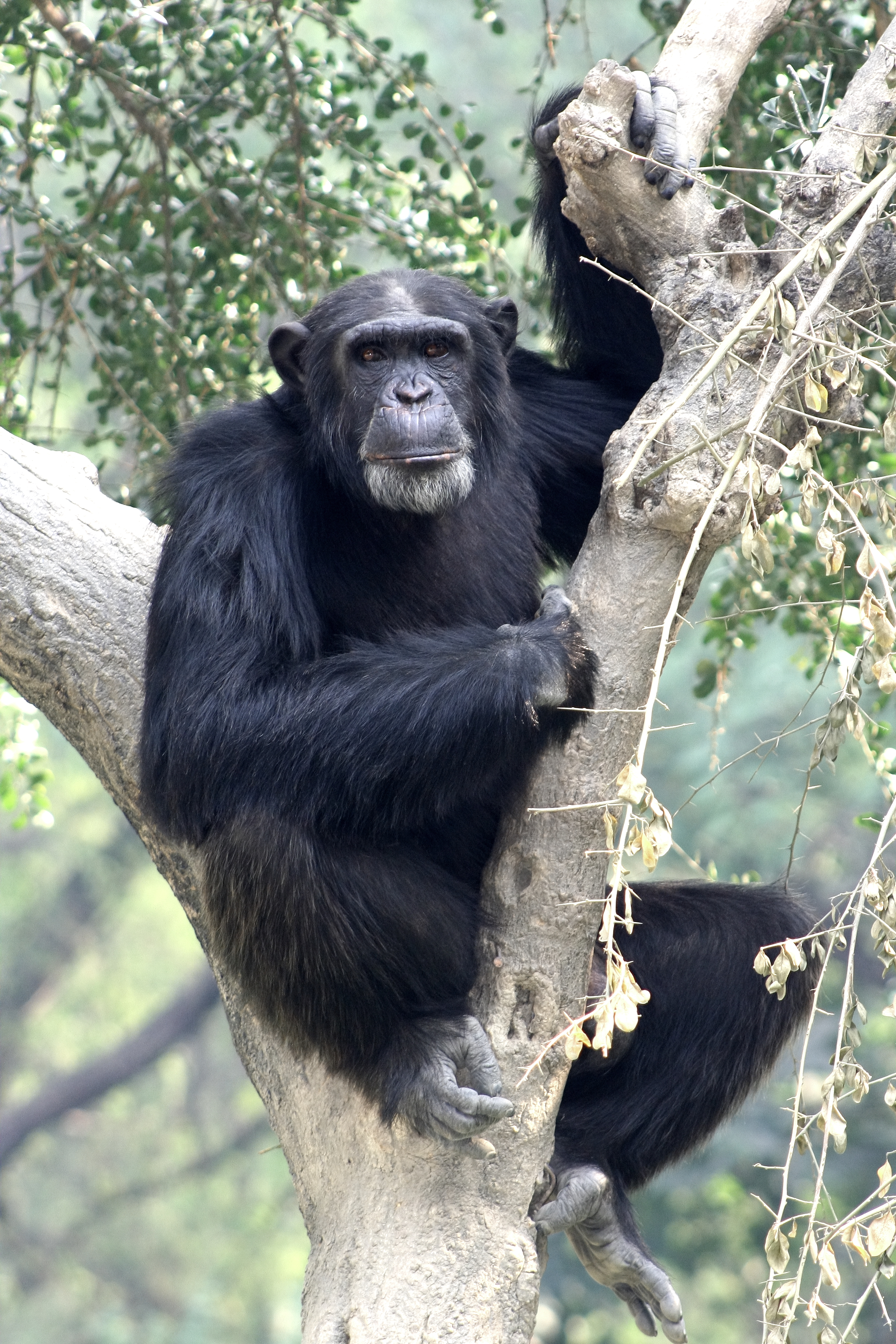
Chhajju, a chimpanzee

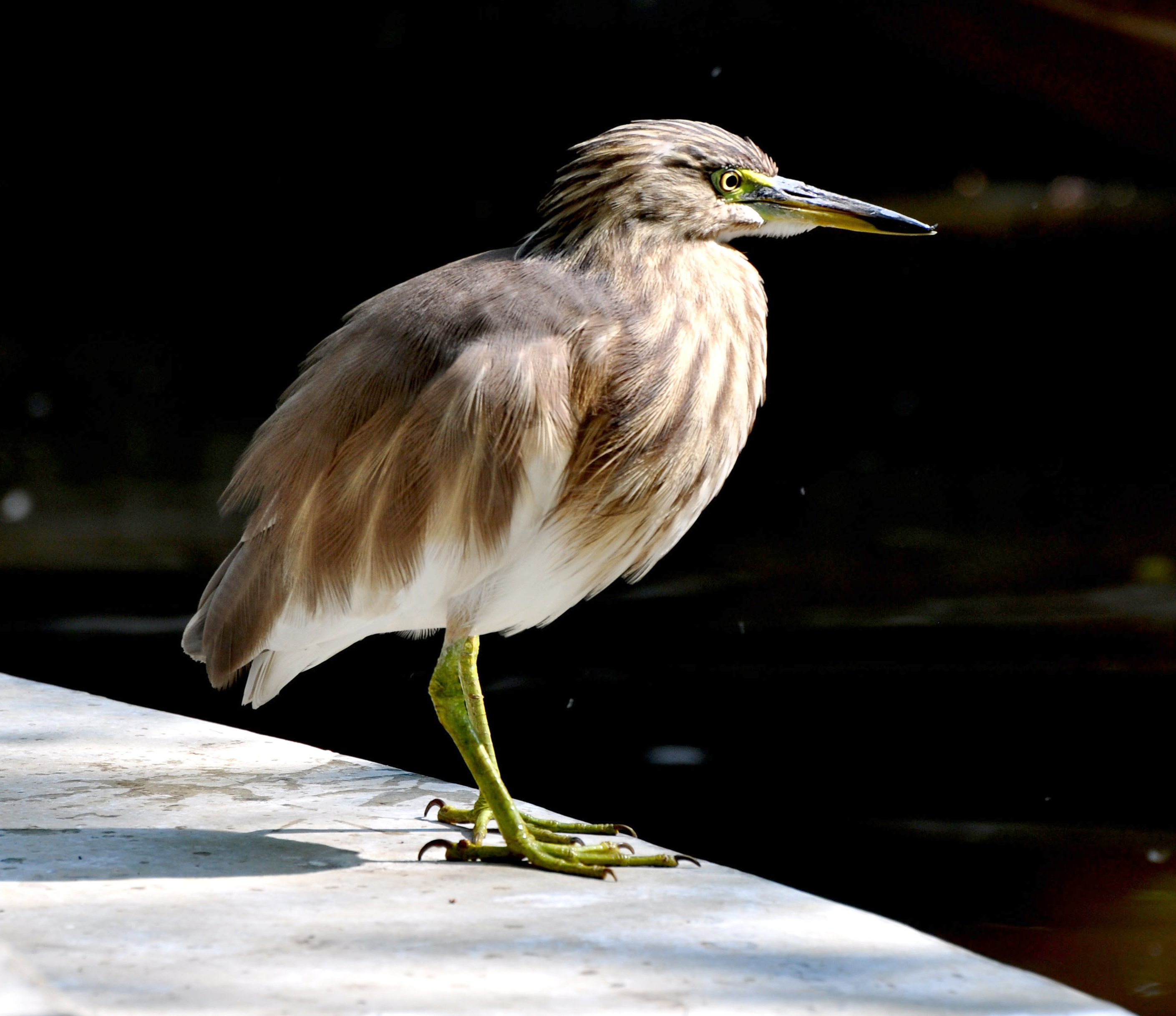
Indian pond heron

== Attractions ==
=== Botanical garden ===
The zoo houses a botanical garden with a collection of some of the country's rare species of plants that is dotted with sylvan lakes. The zoo grounds are also professionally maintained by forest conservationists, and it records large attendance from all age groups and communities in Kanpur. It is a popular destination for picnics, nature walks, and outdoor recreation, as well as teaching school students about natural habitats, environmental issues, and responsible eco-friendly living.

Butterfly Park

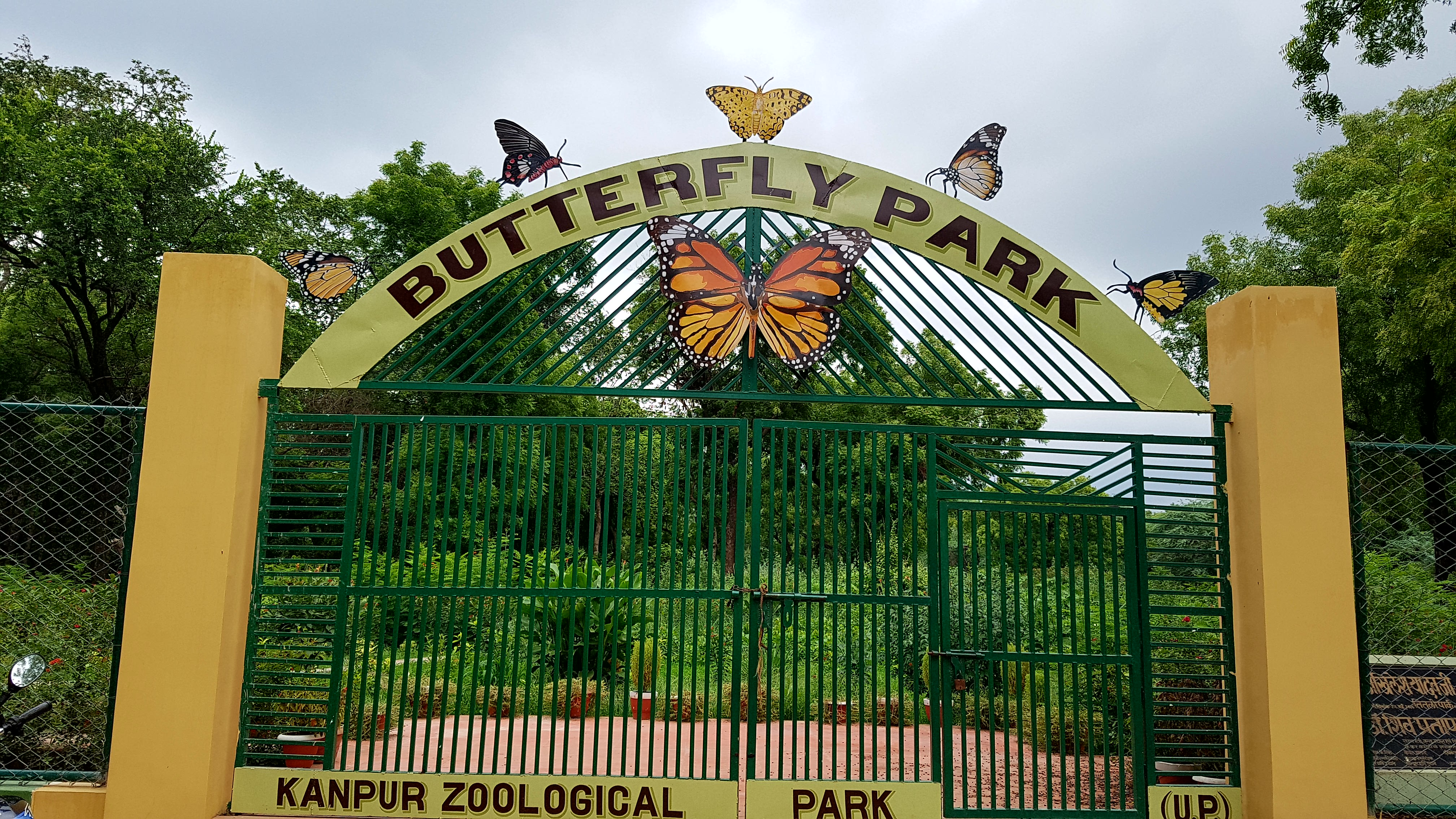
Uttar Pradesh's first butterfly park

It was constructed at an estimated cost of Rs 1 crore. A total of 100 species of flowers including Calendula, Gulmehendi and Dahlia; have been planted in order to attract the butterflies. By now, more than 50 species of butterflies have already been observed in the park.

=== Lake ===
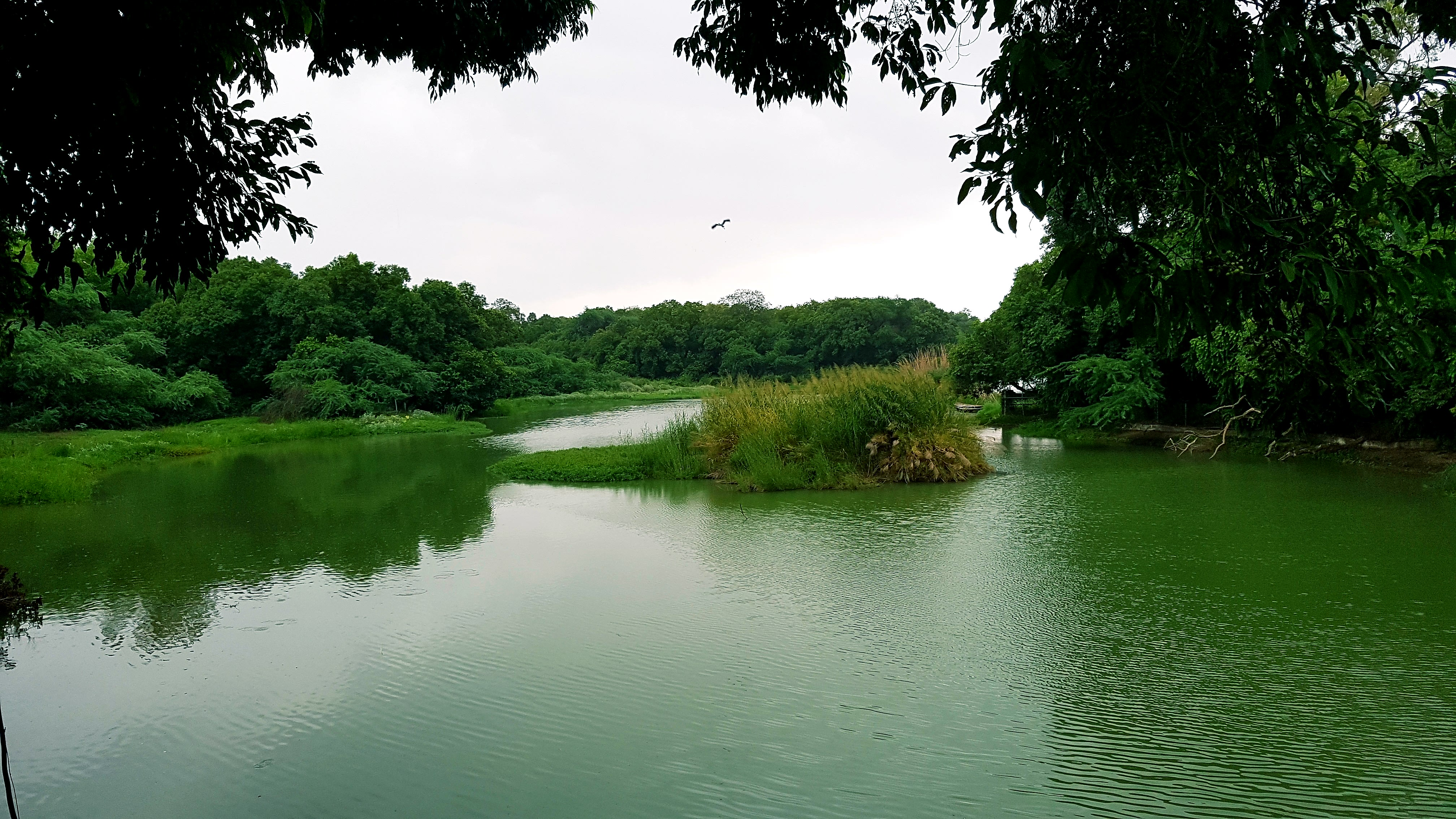
Zoo lake as seen near the main entrance

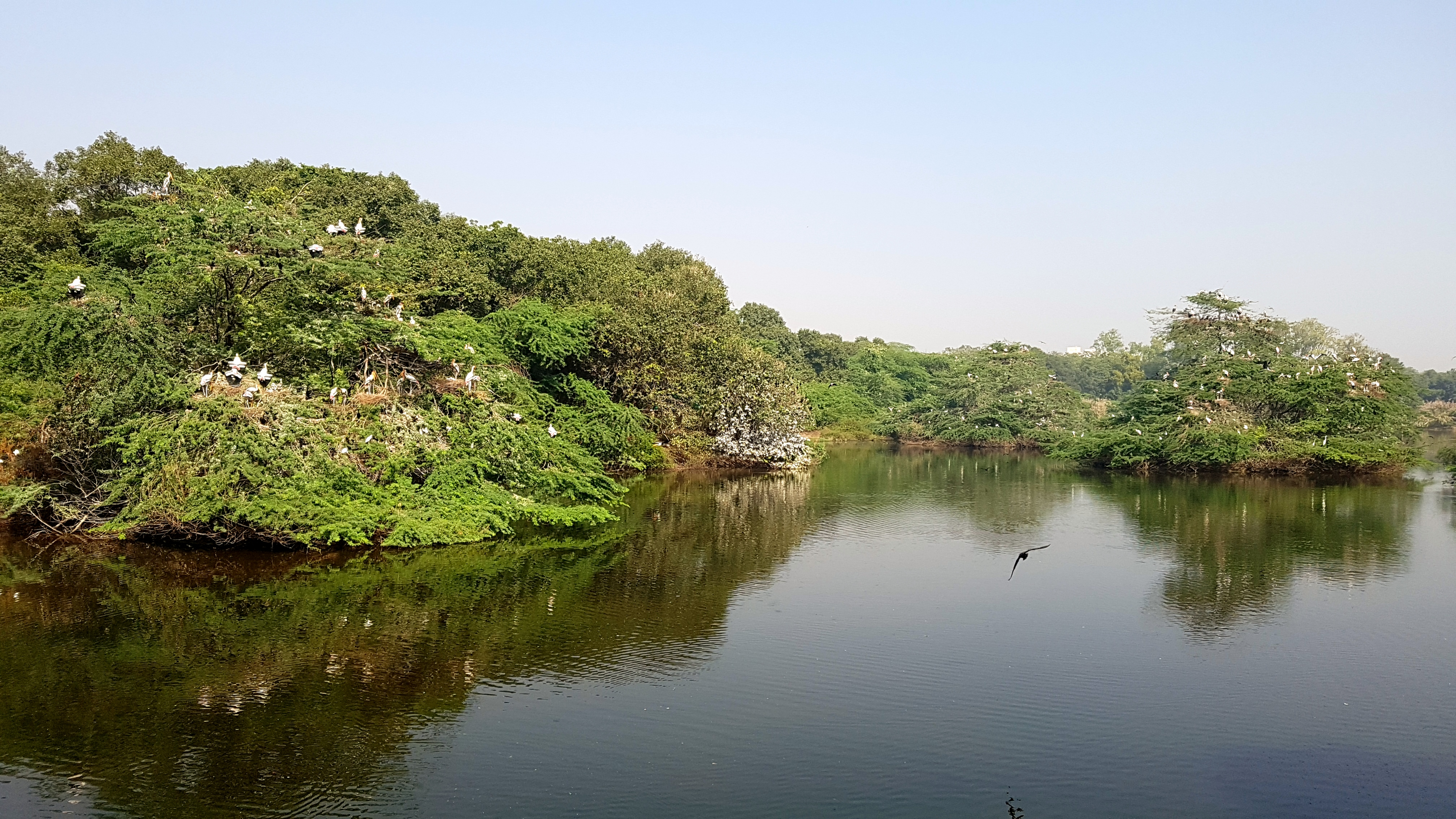
Lake's view from the reserved forest area

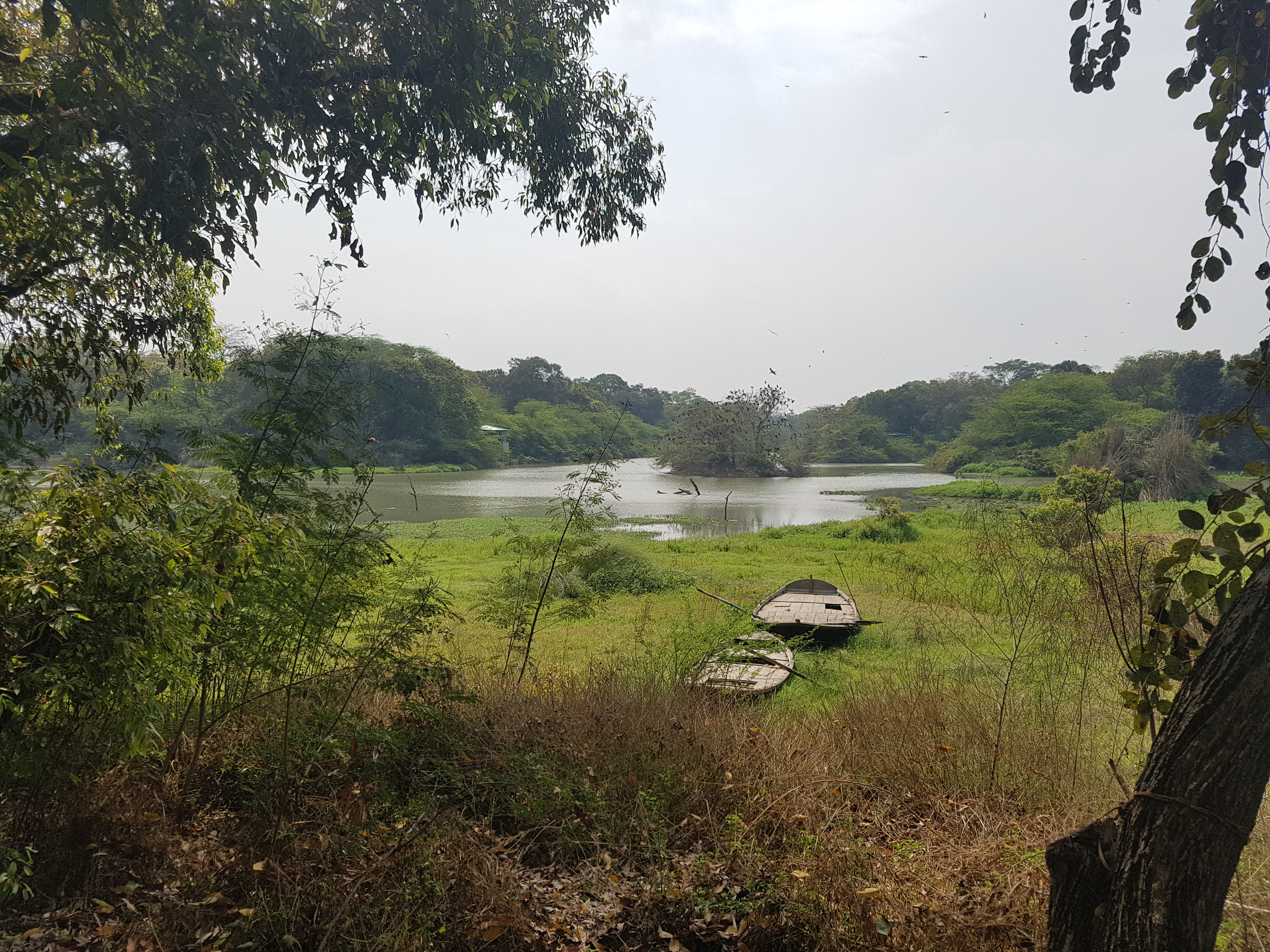
Lake's view near administrative block

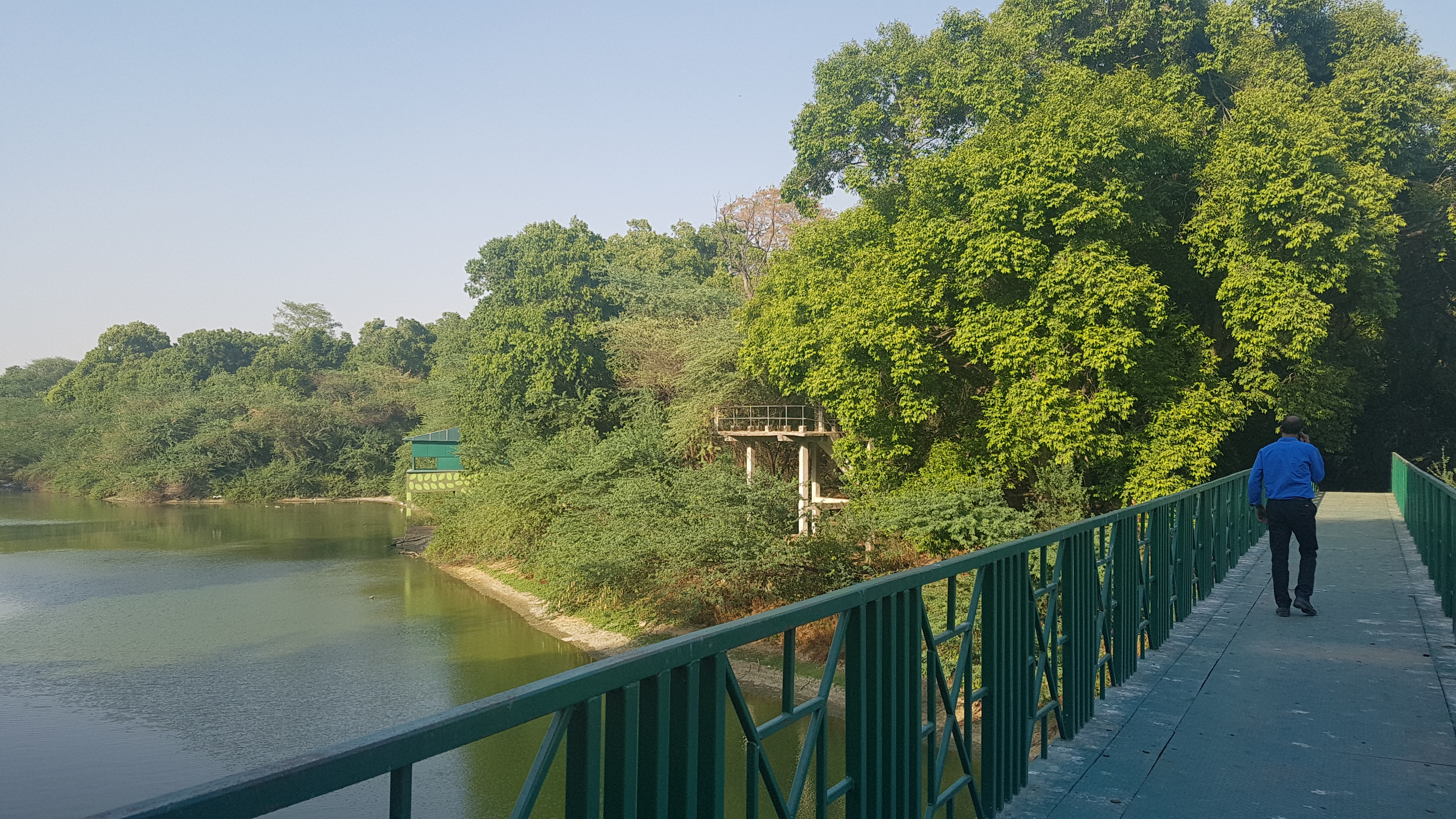
Bridge over the lake

A rainwater lake is the centre of attraction at Allen Forest, and visitors can see hundreds of deer grazing in open savannah-like land without fear of any predator. A total of 741 birds were spotted in the lake area which belonged to staggering 44 different species including Pied Kingfisher, orange headed thrush, painted storks, little egret, great cormorant, open bill stork, black headed ibis, waterhen, whistling teal, grey hornbill to name a few.

Almost every year, bird watching festival is organised by Kanpur zoo wherein the nature lovers are given a unique experience of witnessing the zoo lake and its catchment area.

A national award-winning Hindi film "Anokha Aspatal" (1989) is entirely filmed in the picturesque, banks of lake surrounded by lush green forest. The camera captures shots of a variety of birds and animals.

=== Aviary ===
The Aviary includes birds from all over the world, including parrots, cranes, parakeets, emus from Australia and New Zealand, various Indian birds, as well as birds from Europe and Latin America.

=== Night house ===
Night creatures are housed in a separate building. These include porcupines, toddy cats (Asian palm civet), and other nocturnal animals.

=== Aquarium ===
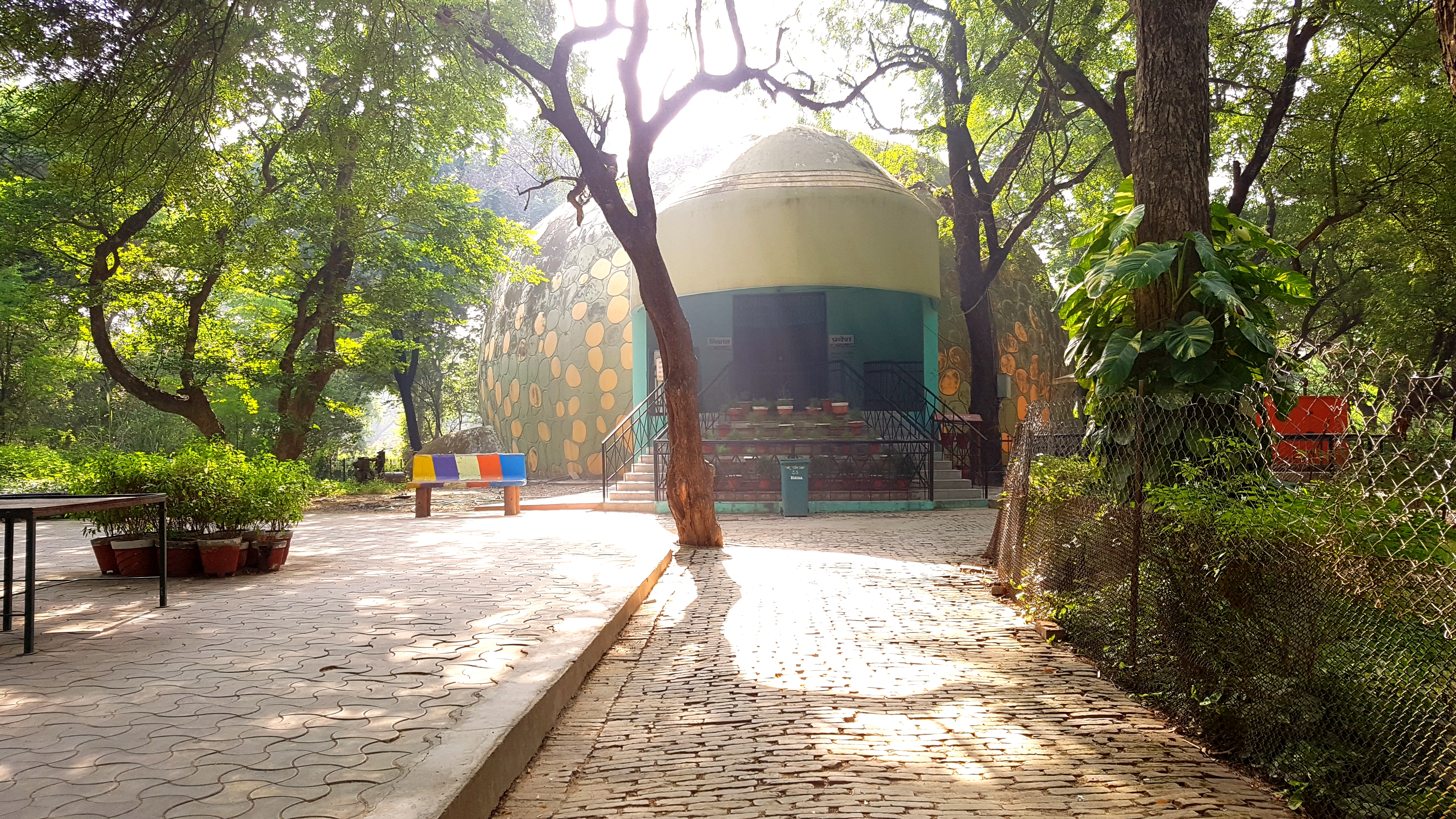
Main entrance of aquarium

The zoo includes an aquarium which charges a small fee of ₹10 for entry.

=== Life size dinosaur sculptures ===
There are life size sculptures of pre-historic dinosaurs.

=== Toy train ===
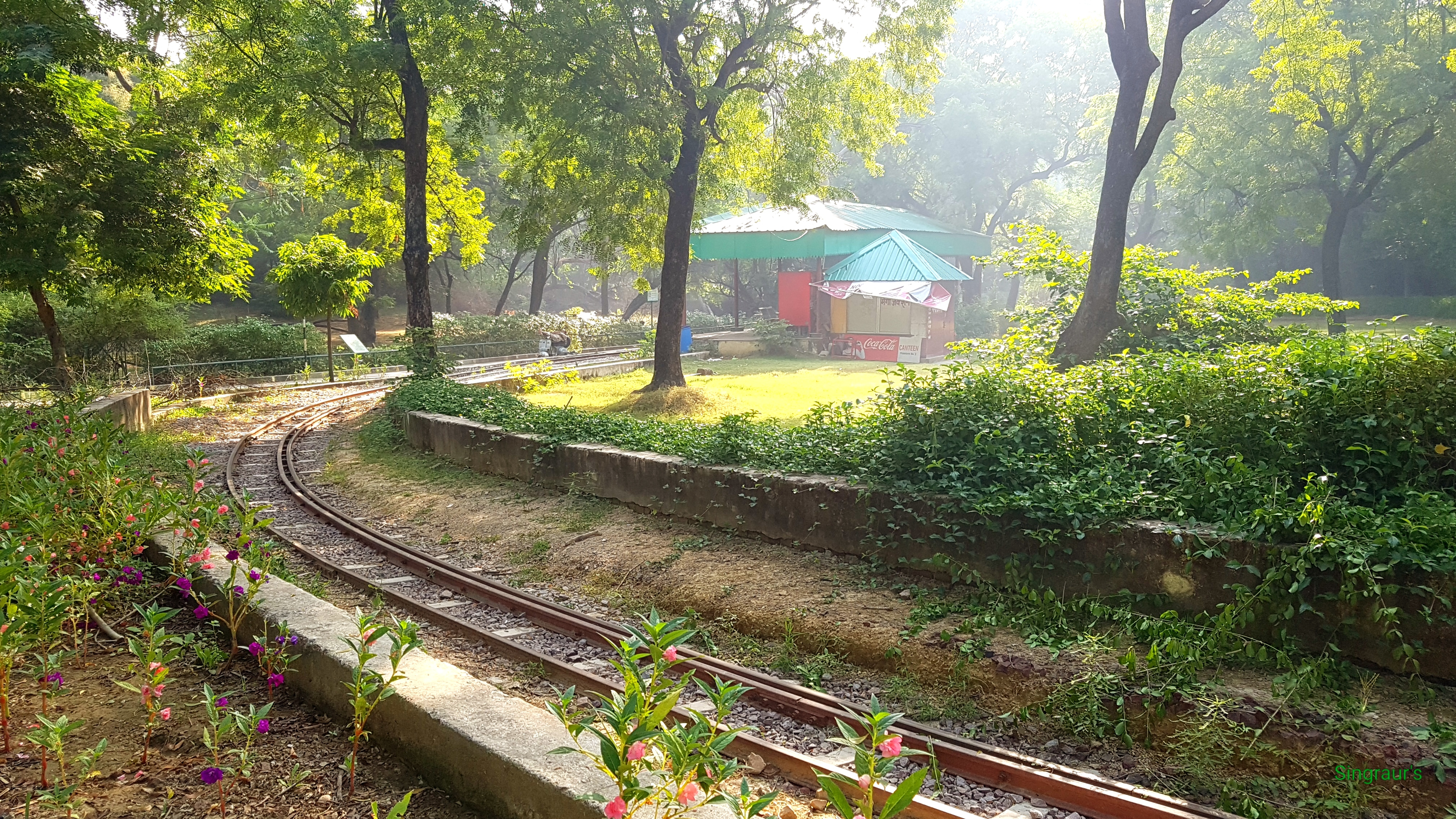
Toy train station near the lion enclosure

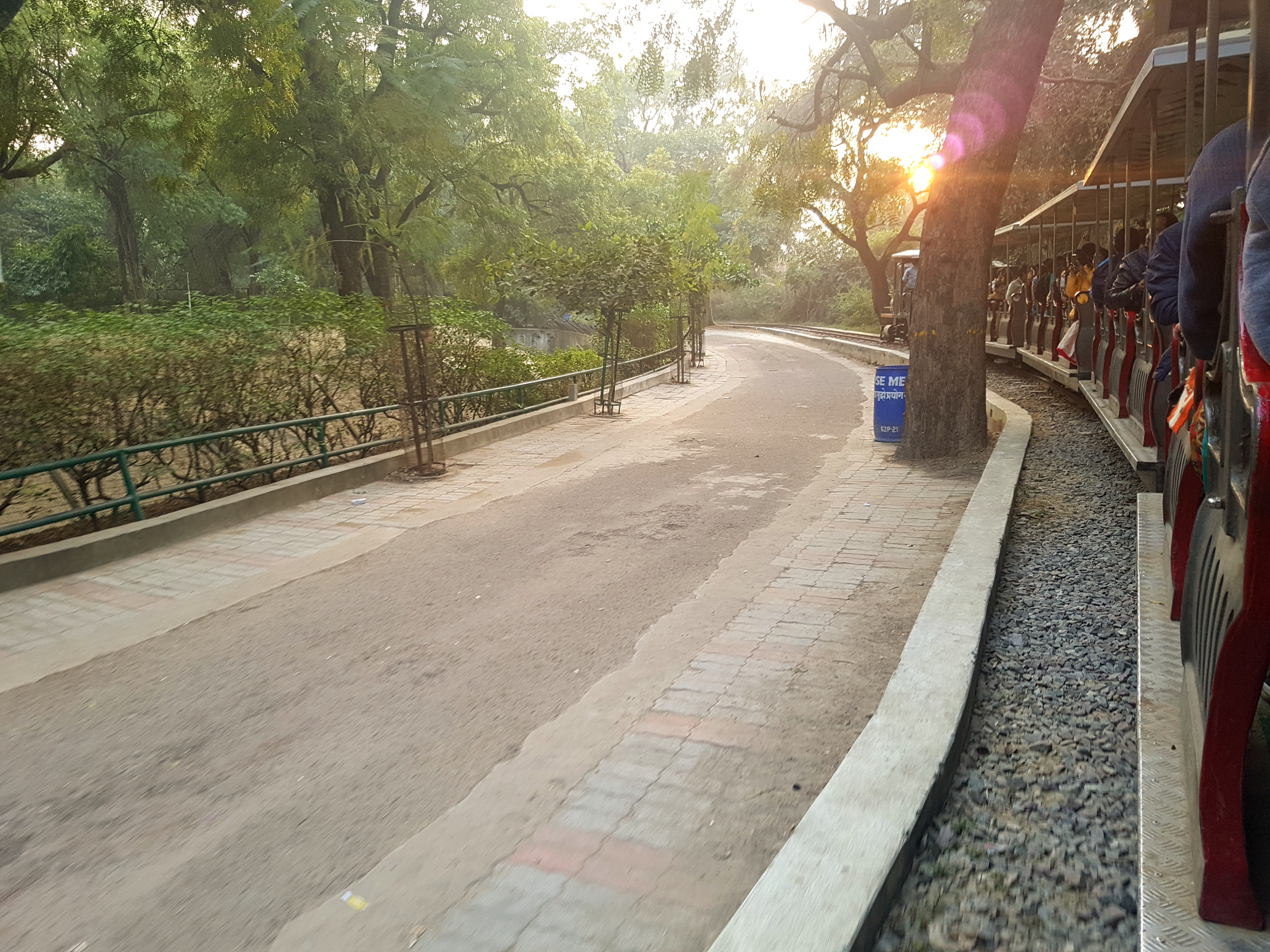

In 2014 master plan, state government sanctioned about ₹12 crore ($1619442) for the railway stations, tracks and the toy train. In the initial blueprint of the project, the forest would've suffered a huge loss of greenery. But due to the conservation efforts by a leading English daily, the zoo administration took cognizance of the matter and the blueprint was revised.

== Conservation ==
The zoo includes a state-of-the-art veterinary hospital that can treat several animals at a time, including hyena, tiger, leopard, bear, elephant etc. that are brought into the zoo, usually after bad encounters with humans.

In 2014; except CNG vehicles, all petrol and diesel driven vehicles were banned inside the zoo, to curb noise and air pollution. Plastic water bottles and polythene bags are banned inside the zoo. Although photography is permitted. The zoo discourages visitors from feeding animals.

Zoo's current team of doctors; Dr.RK Singh, Dr.UC Srivastava and Dr. Mohd Nasir, have not only reduced the mortality rate of zoo to one of the lowest in the country but also have improvised novel methods of animal treatment published in globally acclaimed wildlife journals; such as remote cleaning of wound of rhinoceros using half horse power water pump, solution of 2% potassium permanganate and 4% povidone-iodine solution for two hours daily; was published in Rhino Resource Centre, sponsored by the World Wide Fund for nature (WWF), SOS Rhino and International Rhino Foundation

Prevention of infection by confinement of the animal by making a coating of turmeric and the ayurvedic antimicrobial agent on a leopard's tail, who was suffering from gangrene is another adroit accreditation to the zoo authorities. Further it prevented residual infection and helped in the healing of the tissue.

Zoo vets had carried out a successful cosmetic surgery of a badly thrashed 15-feet long massive python and a barking deer's drooped lower jaw.

Earlier, the zoo vets used broody hen for hatching of the eggs. But this process had its own limitations. To increase the number of chicks of Pheasants, the Kanpur zoo administration has imported an automatic egg incubator.

In a first of its kind initiative in the country, Kanpur Zoological Park developed an open ‘Raptor Restaurant’ with twin objectives of conserving the dying species of vulture, eagle, kites and crows besides utilising the leftover meat.

Zoo vets performed a rare feat when they hand-reared 7 days old chicks of Barn Owl and Jungle Owl species, protected under the Wildlife Protection Act, 1972.

== Sponsors ==
The zoo authorities encourage local Kanpur and Uttar Pradesh based industrialists and business owners to take interest in the development and preservation of the ecological heritage of the Kanpur Zoo and its potential for development as a rare natural habitat based zoo.

== See also ==
- Nawab Wajid Ali Shah Prani Udyan
- Shaheed Ashfaq Ullah Khan Prani Udyan
- Etawah Safari Park
