= Kabir Jayanti =

Indian religious festival

- Observed by: Followers of Kabir panth
- Type: Religious (1–2 days), cultural
- Significance: Commemorate of manifestation of Saint Kabir
- Celebrations: Devotees organise programs and recite poems written by Saint Kabir Das.
- Date: Purnima Tithi (Full Moon) in the month of Jyeshtha
- Frequency: Annual

Kabir Jayanti, also known as Kabir Praakat Diwas, is celebrated to commemorate the birth of Kabir, a famous poet and mystic saint in India. It is celebrated once in a year on the full moon day in the Hindu month Jyeshtha, which is the month of May or June according to the Gregorian calendar. Worshipers believe that Kabir was born on this day in the year 1398 A.D. Kabir Jayanti was celebrated on 24 June in 2021, the 2022 date was to be 14 June and 2023 date was to be 4 June.

== Significance ==
Kabir Jayanti celebrates the day Kabir was born, the full moon day of Jyeshtha month of the Hindu calendar in 1398 A.D. It is disputed as to how he appeared on Earth. Some believe that he took birth from Muslim parents, while others insist that he himself appeared on a lotus flower in lake Lahartara. In fact, there is a Kabirpanth on the Lahartara lake today which reinforces this very belief.

== Legend ==
Kabir is said to have appeared on a lotus flower in the year 1398 (Samvat 1455), on the full moon day of Jyeshtha month at the time of Brahmamuharta. Kabir is said to have come from Satlok by assuming the body of light and incarnated on a lotus flower. Rishi Ashtanand was the direct witness of this incident.

== Celebration ==
The anniversary is celebrated in India as a special Jayanti. It is celebrated in different parts of India.

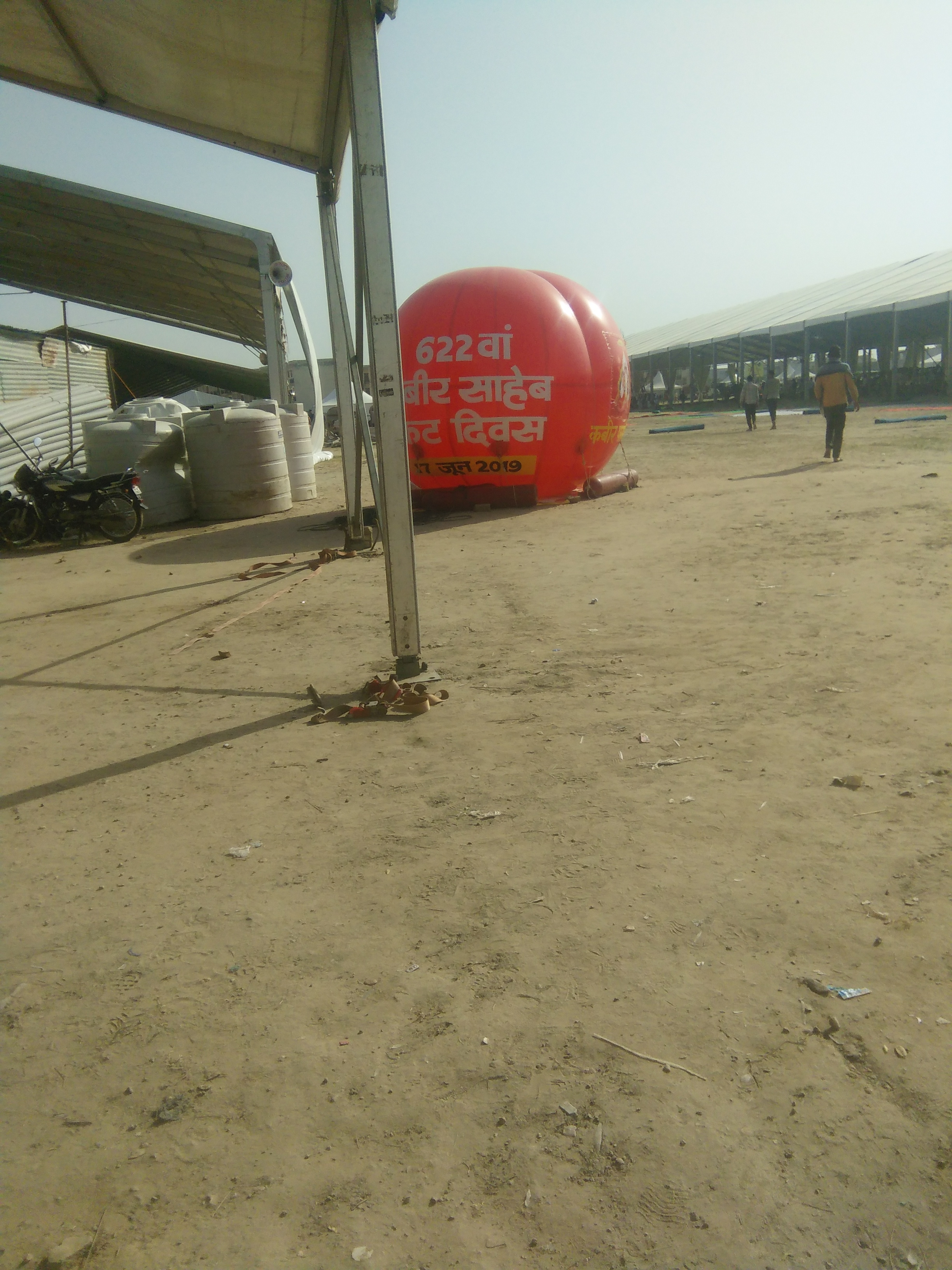
Kabir Prakat Diwas celebration at rohtak

On this day, his followers remember his teachings and recite his poems together. Many Bhandaras are also held throughout India by many Kabirpanthis. Kabir was also a social reformer, so much social work is also done by his followers on this day. Kabir Jayanti was celebrated on 5 June in 2020 and the 2021 date will be 24 June.

== See also ==
- Ravidas
