= Lahartara Pond =

Historical pond

Lahartara Pond is a historical pond associated with the appearance of Saint Kabir Saaheb. According to a legend, Saint Kabir Saaheb was found floating on a lotus flower in the pond. It is located in Varanasi, Uttar Pradesh in India. In the past, it was a large freshwater lake that spanned 17 acres (0.07 km^{2}). In the present day, it no longer has its historical grandeur because about 3.5 acres (0.014 km^{2}) of the pond is under the directorate of archaeology, Uttar Pradesh, while another 8 acres (0.03 km^{2}) are under Satguru Kabir Prakat Dham.

== History and legends ==
The history of the Lahartara Pond is connected with the famous poet and mystic Saint Kabir. It is situated in the Varanasi District, in Uttar Pradesh, and is a short distance away from Kabir Math. At first, the pond occupied 17 acres (0.07 km^{2}), but nowadays it's been fractionated and placed under the jurisdiction of different institutions. Legend says that infant Kabir was found floating on a lotus flower.

== Religious and cultural significance ==
The pond has a great significance among the Kabir Panthis for its connection with the appearance of Kabir Sahib Ji. Kabir Sahib Ji was found lying on a lotus flower in this pond in an infant Form, from where Neeru-Neema, the foster parents of Kabir, took Kabir home.

== Pollution and environmental concerns ==
The fabled pond of Lahartara is situated near the GT Road on the Allahabad route. Once a sight for sore eyes, today it lies in a more destitute state. About 1.6 miles (2.5 km) from the Varanasi Cantonment railway station, spread over 17 acres (0.07 km^{2}), is nothing but a dumping ground for filth and a swamp of wastewater.

Only about 3.5 acres (0.014 km^{2}) of the pond is protected by the directorate of archaeology, Uttar Pradesh, and about 8 acres is under the possession of Sadguru Kabir Prakatya Dham. The remaining part has been surrounded by rampant encroachment on all sides.

Sadguru Kabir Prakatya Dham continues to better manage its portion of the pond. They have come up with a plan to construct a grand memorial and a fixed pond within the pond. Chief of Panth Hazoor Ardhnan Saheb, while sharing remarks about the deteriorating condition of the Heritage Site, spoke about the continuing progress being made at the memorial of Saint Kabir and said that the historically significant pond should immediately be restored and a plan should be put into place that ensures that such sites don't get neglected in the future.

In August 2003, the High Court ordered that improvements should be made to the pond, but as of 2020 it was still in bad condition.
