= Bijak =

Compilation of sacred texts and poetry

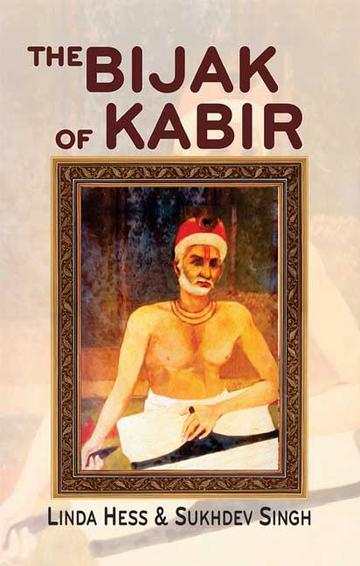
The Bijak of Kabir

Bijak is a compilation of verses and hymns attributed to Kabir, a 15th-century Indian mystic poet and saint.
