= Penaz Masani =

Indian ghazal singer

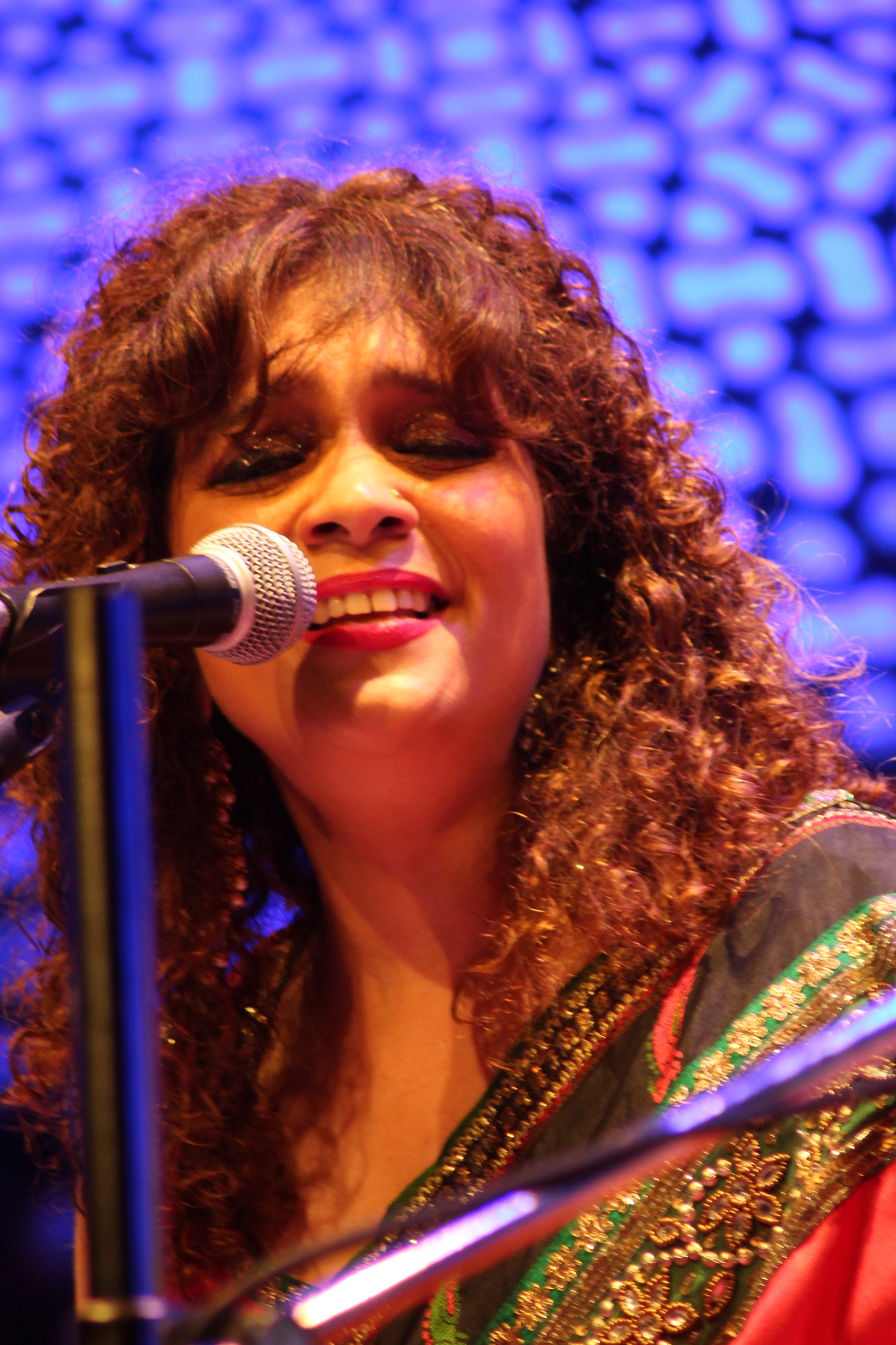
- In a concert Shaam-E-Firdous at Ravindra Bhavan Bhopal September 2016
- Born: Navsari, Gujarat
- Occupations: Singer, dancer
- Years active: (1981–present)

Penaz Masani is an Indian ghazal singer who started singing in 1981 and has made over 20 albums.

== Career ==
In her career, she has won a number of awards, including the title of 'Shehzadi-e-Tarannum', by the state government of Uttar Pradesh 1996 and the 11th 'Kalakar Award' for 'Outstanding Contribution to Music', in 2002. Having graduated from Sydenham College, Masani has worked as a playback singer for Bollywood, in more than 50 Hindi movies and sung in over ten languages. Under the aegis of the Indian Council for Cultural Relations, she has performed in countries as far reaching as Germany, South Africa, Nigeria, Ghana, Senegal and Vietnam. In one of her interviews reported in The Times of India she stated that the song Aap Ki Bazm Mein, was recorded when she was 14. This song was recorded in 1982, which means it implies that she was born in 1968. It was telecast on Doordarshan which called her Kalakaar (performer).

== Awards ==
She was honoured with the Padma Shree award on 26 January 2009.
