= Gorakhpur Zoo =

Zoo in Gorakhpur, Uttar Pradesh, India

Shaheed Ashfaq Ullah Khan Zoological Park Gorakhpur
- Interactive map of Shaheed Ashfaq Ullah Khan Zoological Park Gorakhpur
- 26.7192°N 83.4084°E
- Date opened: 27 March 2021
- Location: Taramandal, Near Nauka Vihar, Gorakhpur, Uttar Pradesh, India
- Land area: 121 acres (49 ha)
- Website: gorakhpurzoo.org

Shaheed Ashfaq Ullah Khan Zoological Park or Gorakhpur Zoological Garden commonly known as Gorakhpur Zoo is in Gorakhpur, Uttar Pradesh, India. It is named after independence activist Ashfaqulla Khan. With an area of 121 acres, it is the second biggest zoo in the state after Kanpur Zoological Park. It was opened for public on 27 March 2021.

== Location ==
Shaheed Ashfaq Ullah Khan Zoological Park is located on the Gorakhpur-Deoria bypass road. It is about 8 km away from Gorakhpur railway/bus station and about 11 km from the airport. This zoological park is the first in Purvanchal and the third of Uttar Pradesh. The historical Ramgarh Tal Lake is situated on one side of it. Gorakhnath temple is 10 km from the zoo.

The city of Gorakhpur is surrounded by the Rapti and Rohin rivers. Kapilvastu, the birth place of Gautam Buddha and Kushinagar, the place of Parinirvana, is also close to this city. It is located in proximity to the circuit house, Buddhist museum, constellation, boating and water sports complex.

== About ==
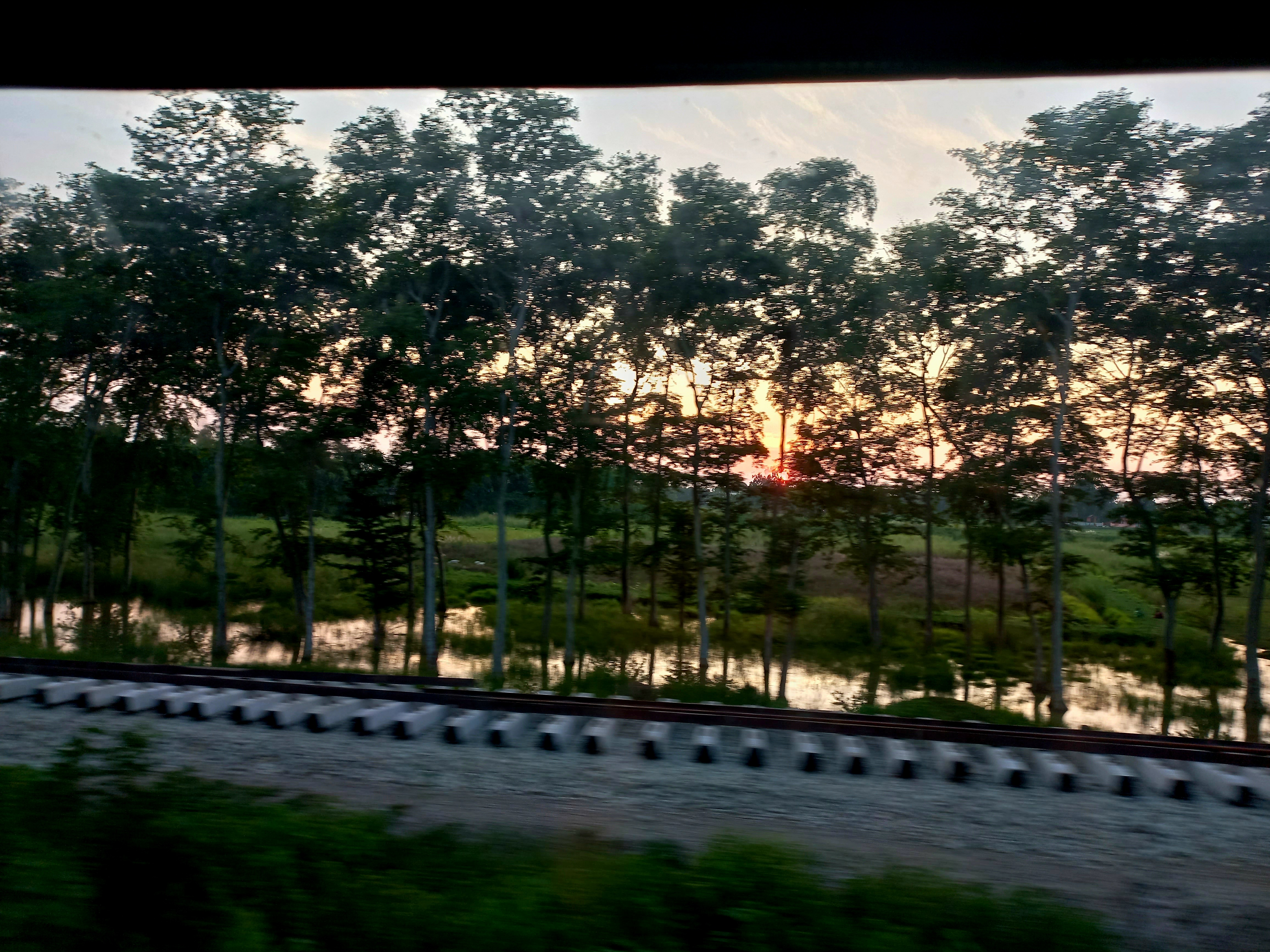
Gorakhpur wetlands

The zoo is established in a total area of 121.34 acres (49.10 ha). About 34 acres are in the form of wetland and 30 acres is dense forest. Tree plantation has been done in an additional area of 20 acres, that is, about 46.5 percent of the area of the zoological park is covered with trees. Due to the development of the zoological park as a green belt / forest like area, the entire area of the zoological park acts as a carbon sink and "green lungs" for the area.

Arrangements have been made to keep 387 wild animals of more than 58 species, including Asiatic Lion, tiger, leopard, rhinoceros, zebra, hippopotamus, 2 species of bear, 3 species of monkey, 6 species of deer. Various species of reptiles and birds including hyena, wolf, aquarium, butterfly park and crocodile, are the center of attraction. It has quarantine centers, rescue centers, a post-mortem house, a kitchen and feed store. Since Gorakhpur Zoological Park is the only one in Purvanchal, establishment of rescue centers facilitate to rescue wild animals straying from the forests of Purvanchal and its adjoining Bihar state and Nepal in the populated area and for their immediate rescue and treatment and thus avoiding man-animal conflict.

A veterinary hospital has been built for monitoring the health of wild animals, scientific study of their nature and research. Apart from this, incinerators have also been installed for disposal of dead wild animals and veterinary waste. Along with this, the zoo has public facilities like an interpretation center, 7D theatre, open air theater, ATM booth, souvenir shops, cafeteria, kiosk, gazebo, resting shed, benches, battery operated vehicle, toilet block. Arrangements have also been made of wheel chair for handicapped, pram for babies, R.O. water points and ODOP (One District One Product) shops. Safety and security includes CCTV, fire extinguishers and alarm system, solar fencing for carnivores, round the clock security arrangements and emergency exits.

There are currently more than 226 animals available in the zoo, including lions, tigers, rhinos, hyenas, hippos, bears, monkeys, different types of deer, 10 types of birds and a beautiful aquarium. In March 2021, the Uttar Pradesh Chief Minister Yogi Adityanath inaugurated the zoo.

This zoological park is the first zoological park of Purvanchal and the third of Uttar Pradesh.

Monday weekly off. Entry Ticket price: (50rs. - over 12 years) (25rs. - 06 years to 12 years) (Free - Less than 06 years)

7D theatre price: (100rs. - over 12 years) (75rs. - 06 years to 12 years) (7D theatre - Tickets can be booked on the spot and on the basis of availability.) Just go to www(dot)gorakhpurzoo(dot)org and book your tickets now
