= Maghar, India =

Maghar
- Town
- Location in Uttar Pradesh, India Maghar (India)
- Coordinates: 26.76°N 83.13°E
- Country: India
- State: Uttar Pradesh
- District: Sant Kabir Nagar
- Elevation: 68 m (223 ft)

Population (2011)
  - Total: 19,181
- Demonym: Maghari

Languages
  - Official: Hindi
- Time zone: UTC+5:30 (IST)
- Postal code: 272173
- Vehicle registration: UP-58
- Website: up.gov.in

Maghar is a town and a nagar panchayat in Sant Kabir Nagar district in the Indian state of Uttar Pradesh.

According to the popular beliefs, Kabir, the 15th-century mystic poet, disappeared and fragrant flowers were found in the place of his body. The flowers were divided between his Hindu and Muslim disciples. The Hindus and the Muslims built two memorials, i.e. a Dargah and a Samadhi, here that are 100 metres apart and kept their share of flowers in them.

== Geography ==
Maghar is located at 26.76°N 83.13°E. It has an average elevation of 68 metres (223 feet). It is situated on the banks of Aami River which is a tributary of river Rapti - a major tributary of Ghaghra river

== Religious significance ==
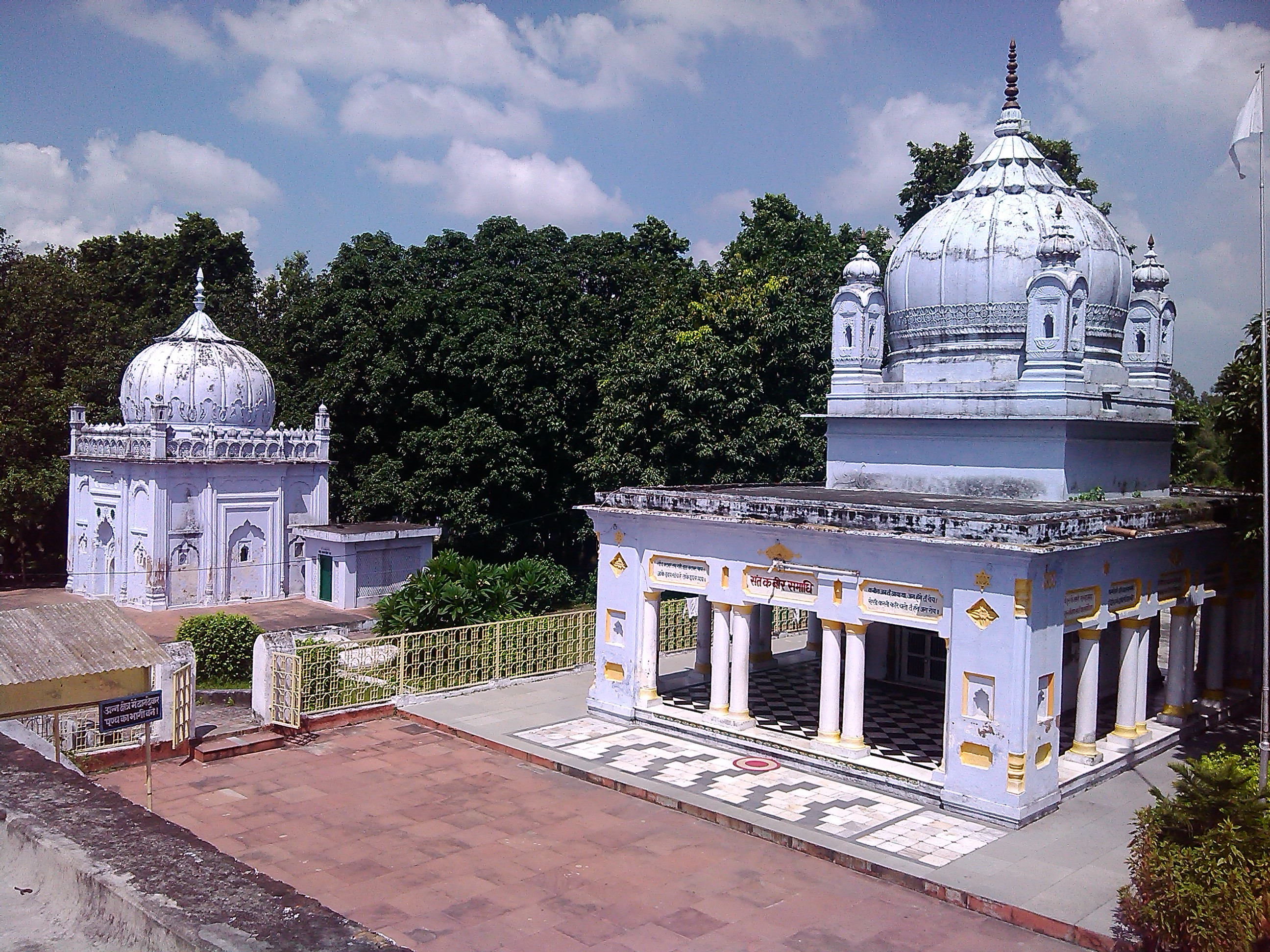
Dargah/Mazaar (left) and Samadhi (at right, front) of Kabir

This place is connected with Kabir. This is the place where he departed from this mortal world. After his departure, his disciples found fragrant flowers only and made two memorials for Saint Kabir. The memorials are situated here just 100 meters away from each other.

== Demographics ==
At the 2011 India census, Maghar had a population of 19,181.

== Gallery ==
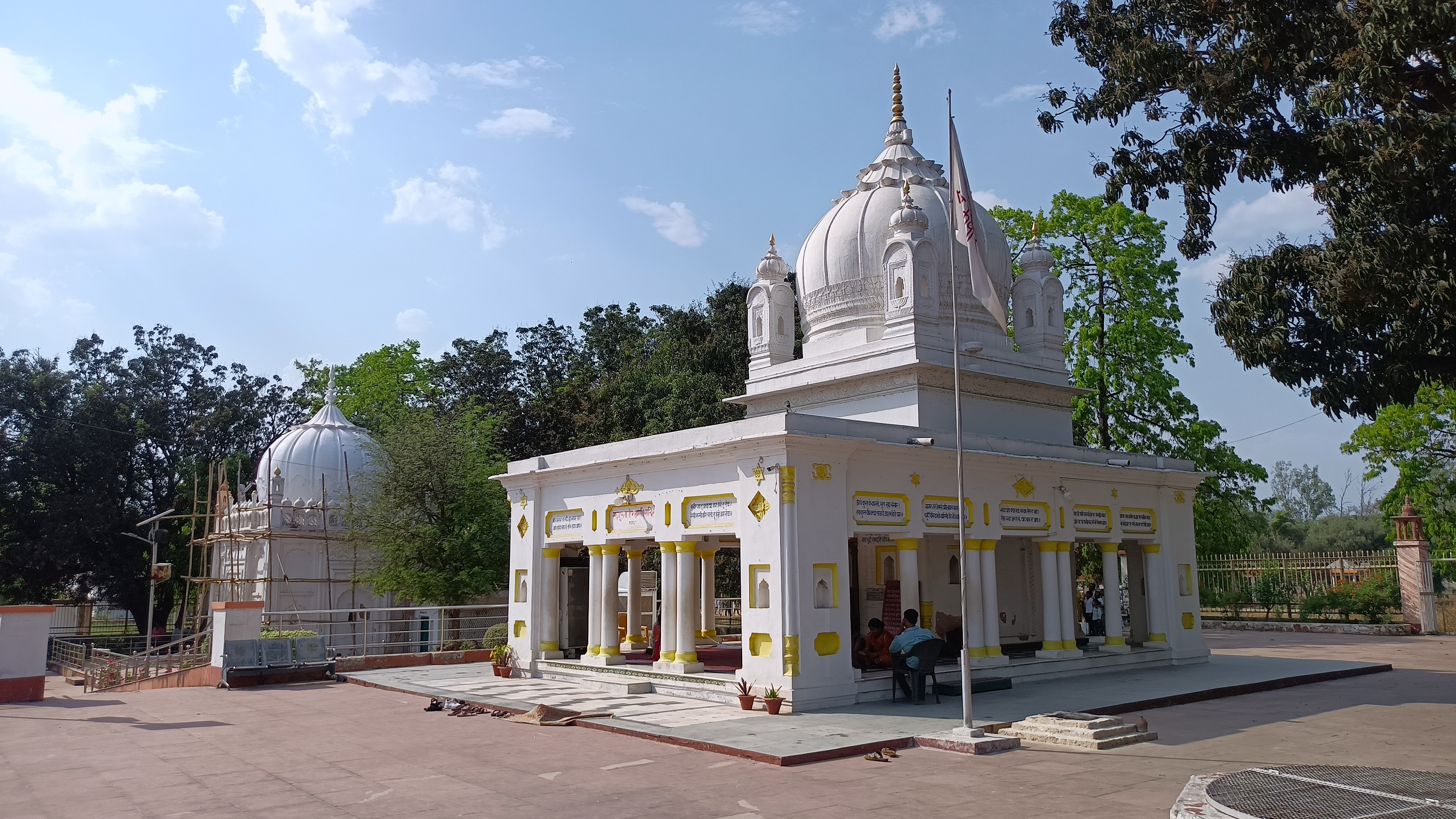
Kabir's Dargah/Mazaar and Samadhi at Maghar

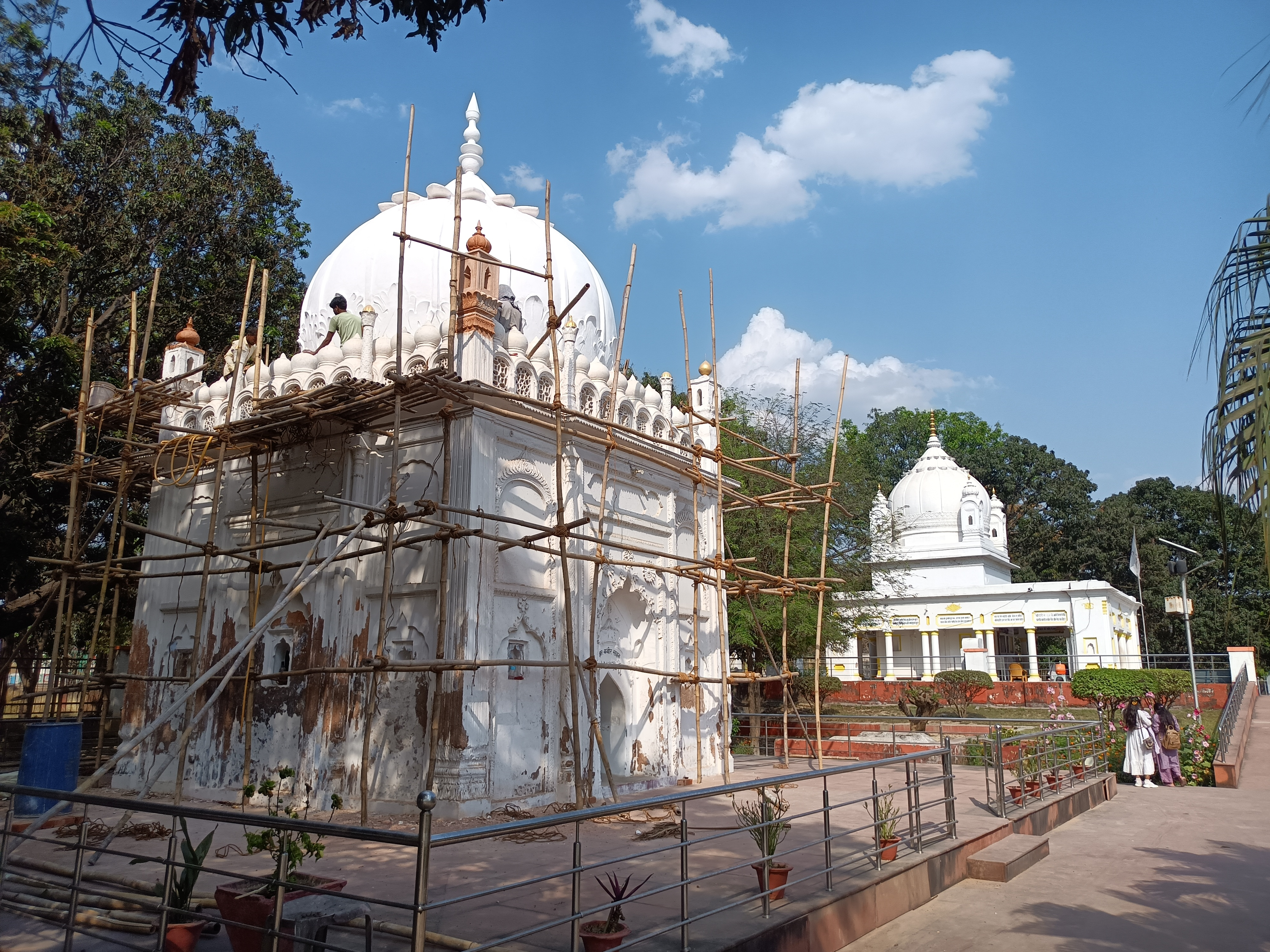
Kabir's Dargah/Mazaar (under restoration in April 2026) and Samadhi at Maghar

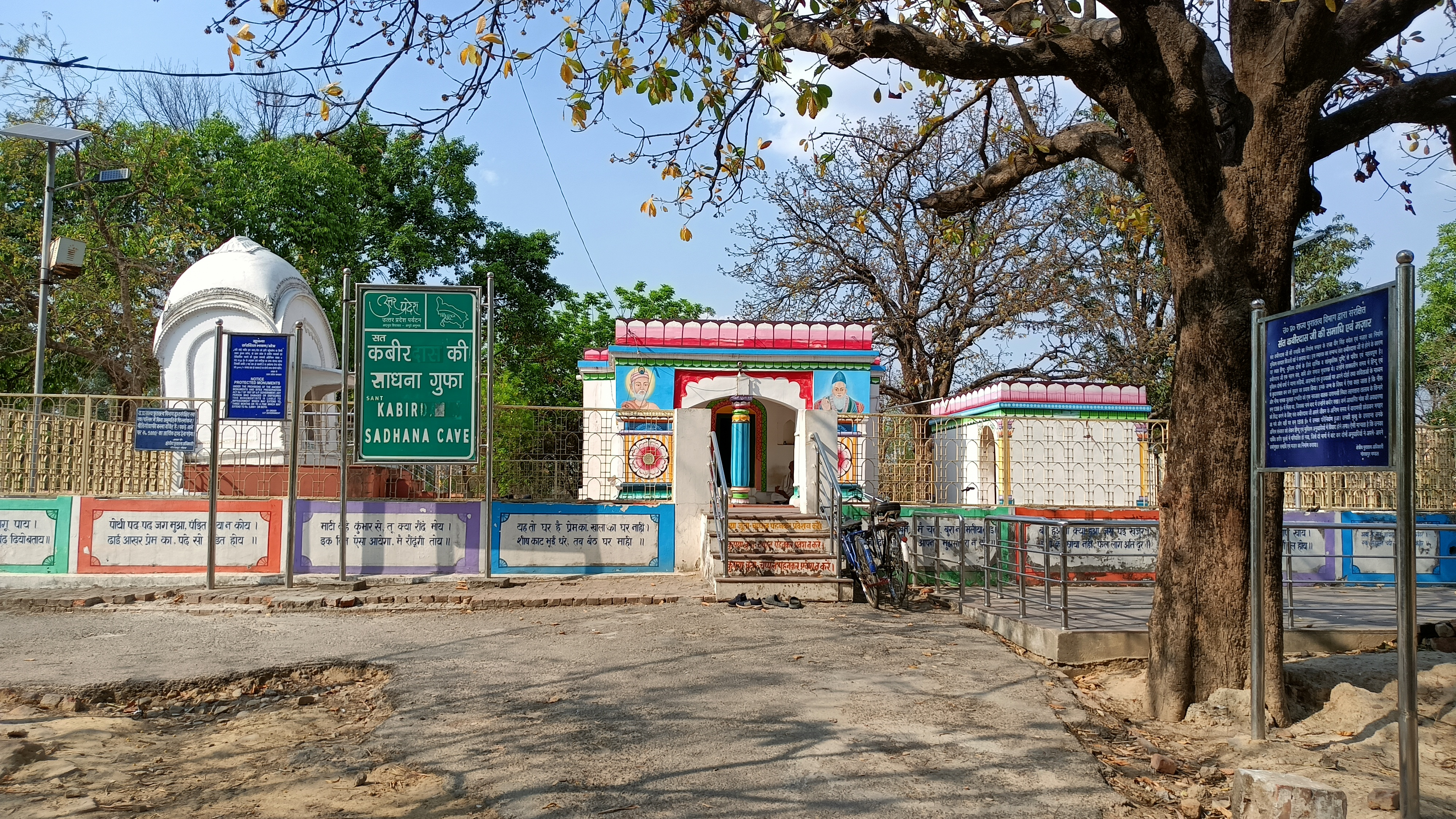
Front of Kabir's Sadhna Gupha (Meditation Cave)

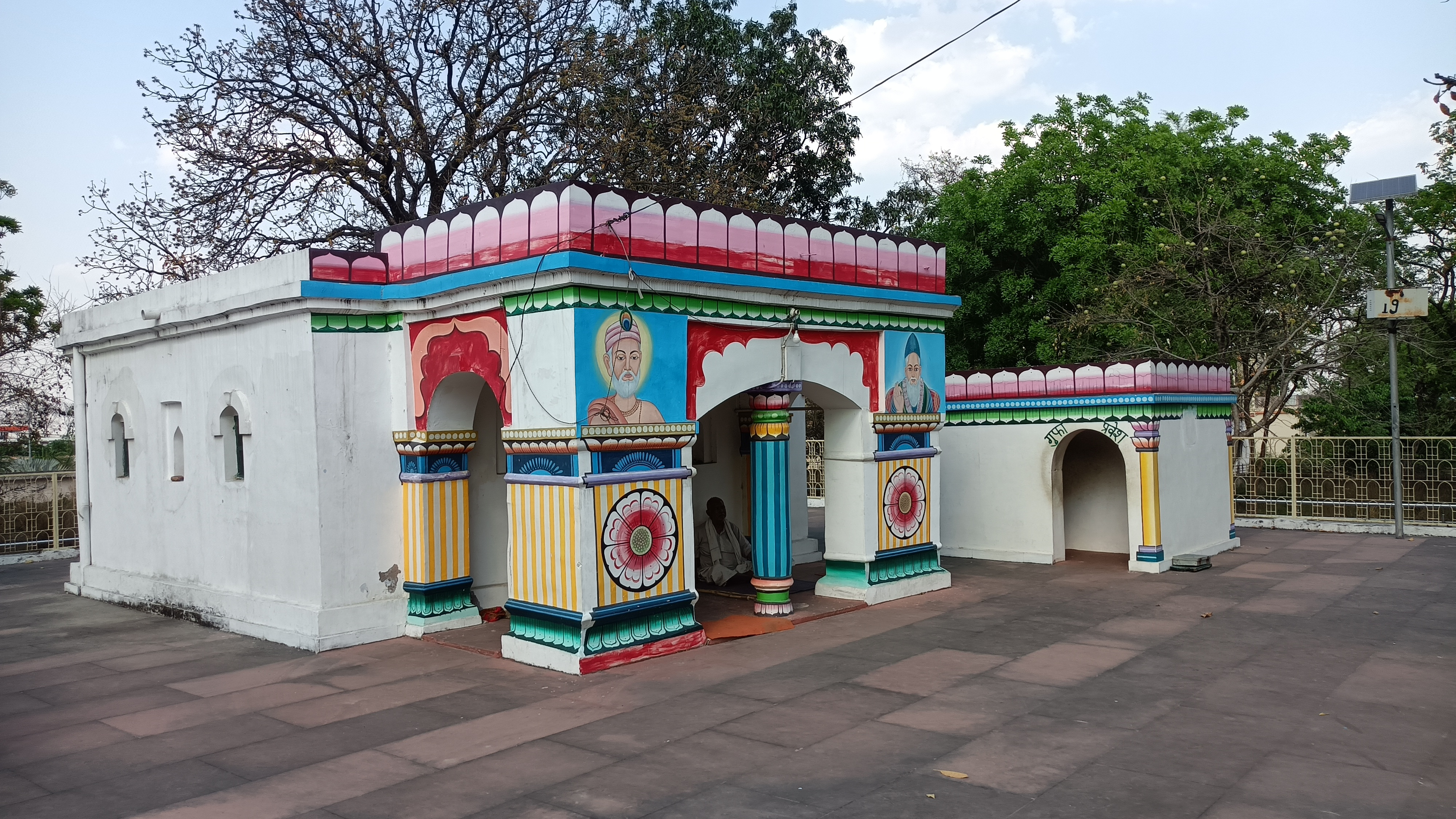
Front of Kabir's Sadhna Gupha (Meditation Cave)

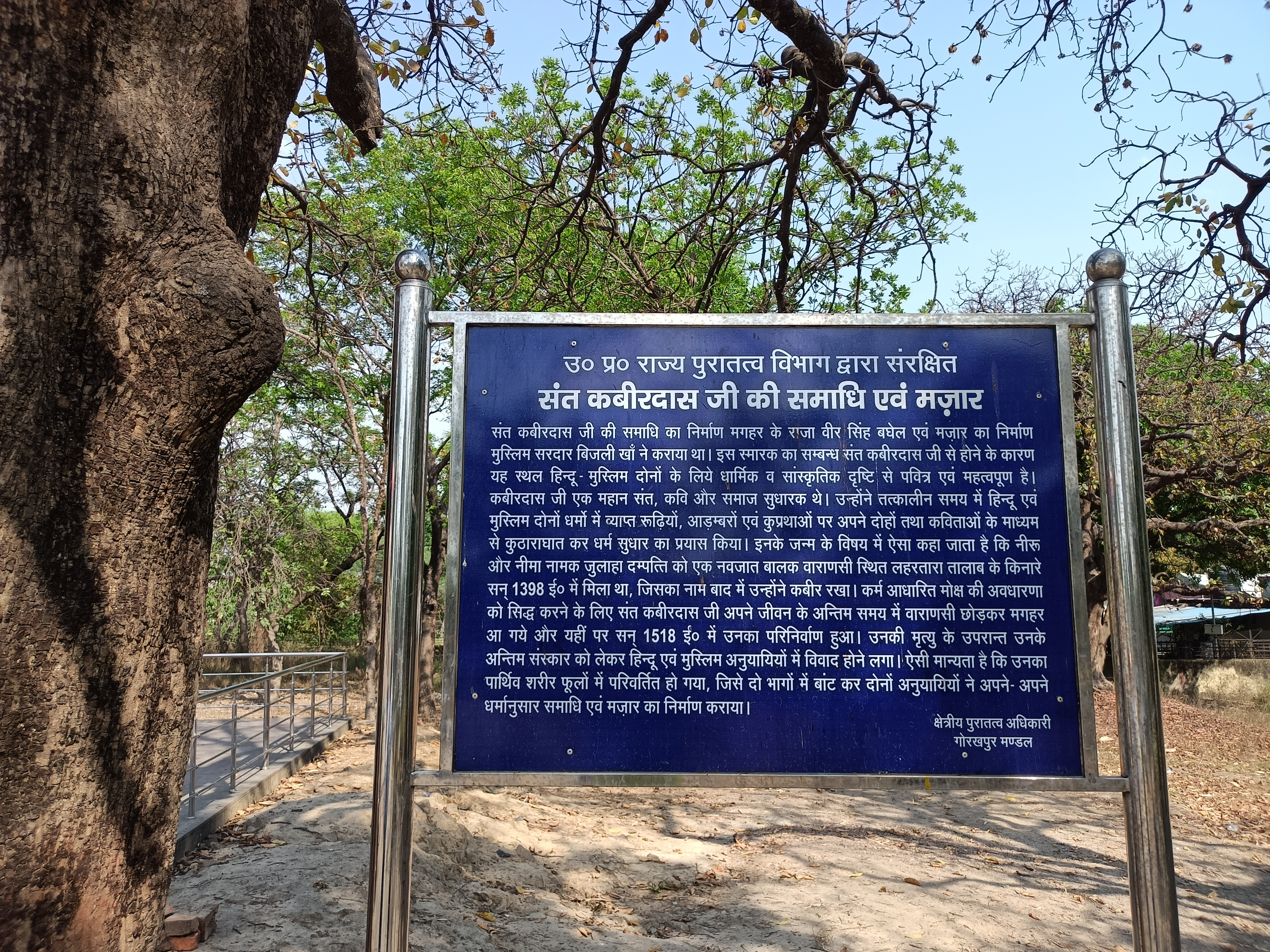
Inforamation board in front of Kabir's Sadhna Gupha (Meditation Cave)
