= Songs of Kabir =

Anthology of poetry of Kabir

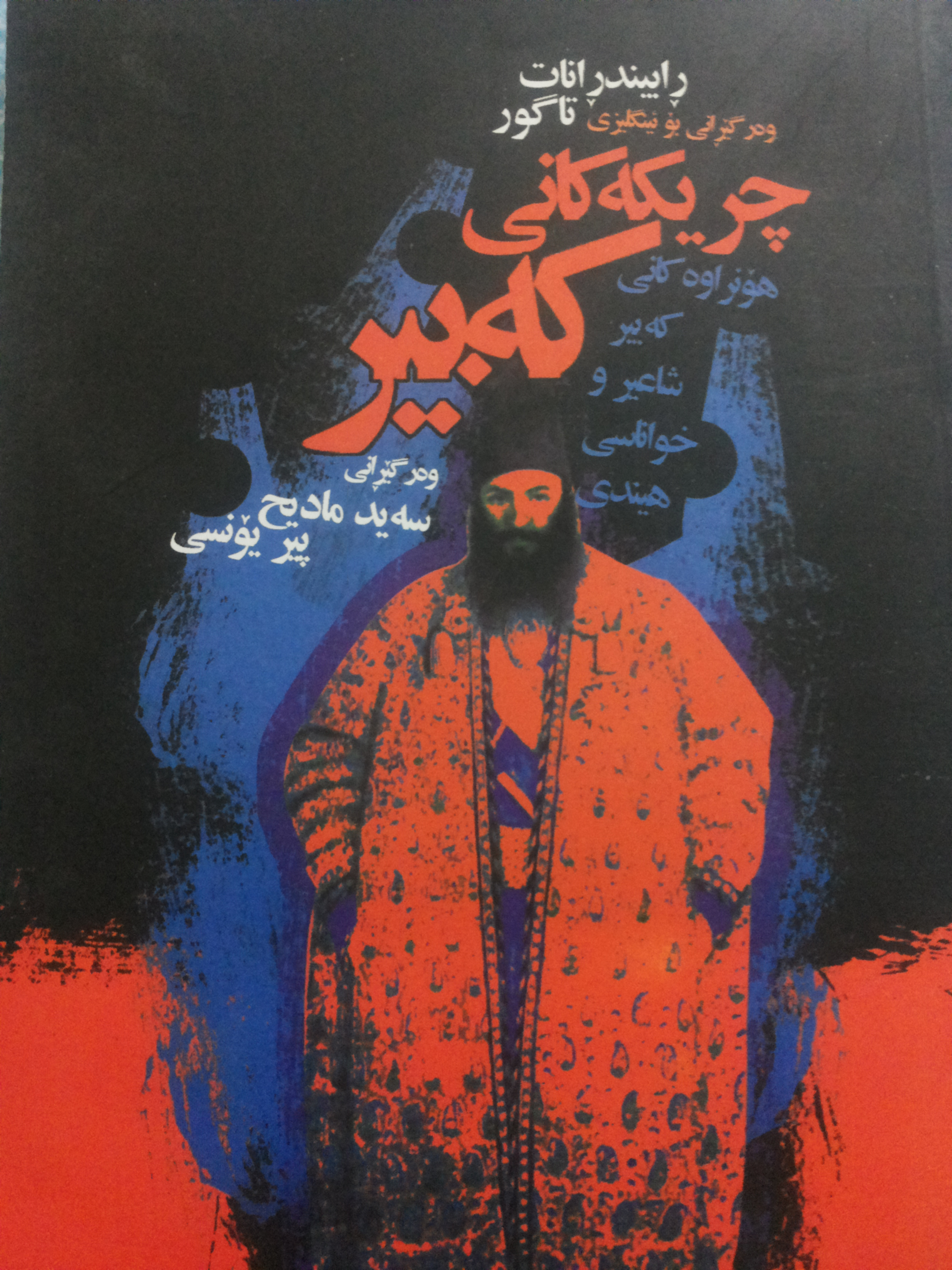
Songs of Kabir (Kurdish version)

Songs of Kabir (New York: MacMillan, 1915) (published in the U.K. as One Hundred Poems of Kabir) is an anthology of poems by Kabir, a 15th-century Indian spiritual master. It was translated from Hindi to English by Rabindranath Tagore, a Nobel Prize-winning author and noted scholar. According to the introduction, by Evelyn Underhill who worked with Tagore on the book, the poems are from the Hindi text of Kshitimohan Sen, who gathered together a large collection of Kabir’s songs from both written and oral sources. Tagore had at his disposal an unpublished former translation of 116 songs, also extracted from Sen’s collection, made by Ajit Kumar Chakravarty. Songs of Kabir has been translated to Persian and Kurdish by Leila Farjami and Sayed Madeh Piryonesi, respectively. The language and format of the English version are archaic by today’s standards, but updated versions are available by Robert Bly (selected poems) and David Masterman.

== Authenticity ==
The introduction tells us that Sen gathered "sometimes from books and manuscripts, sometimes from the lips of wandering ascetics and minstrels – a large collection of poems and hymns to which Kabir’s name is attached, and carefully sifted the authentic songs from the many spurious works now attributed to him. These painstaking labours alone have made the present undertaking possible." The uniformity of thought and style throughout bears witness to the success of these efforts. Nevertheless, the scholar, V.C. Mishra, has suggested that only six of the poems are authentic and that many of the poems may have been composed by later admirers of Kabir. This is undoubtedly the extreme end of the spectrum, but it is reasonable to suppose that even authentic Kabir songs may have been subject to some changes over the course of the four centuries between Kabir’s death and Tagore’s translation, though being in song form will have contributed to their preservation.

== Major Themes ==
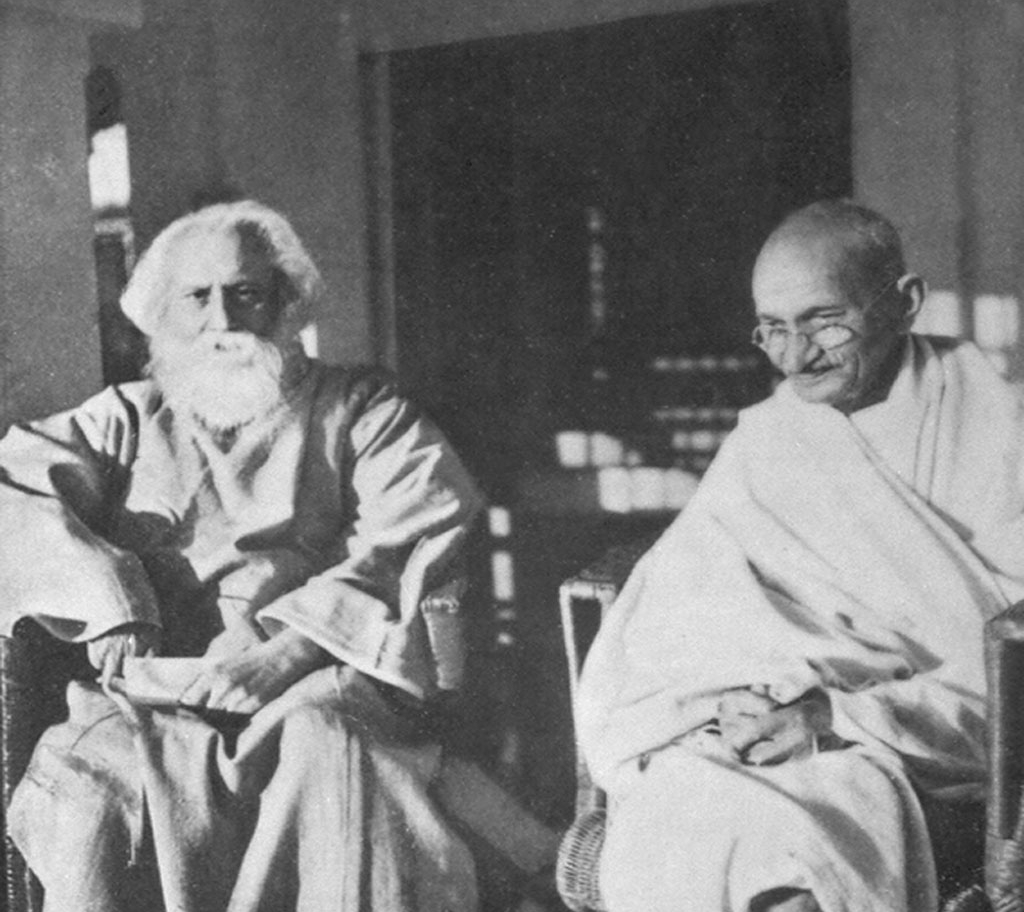
Rabindranath Tagore (left) with Mahatma Gandhi (1940)

=== God Is Within Us ===
In the introduction to his updated version of the anthology, David Masterman summarises the central theme in the following way:

Kabir played down the importance of both ritual and austerity, teaching that God is not confined to mosques, temples, or sites of pilgrimage, but is manifested everywhere in creation. Most importantly, God is within us, and this is where we must look if we seek to know him.

=== The Role of the Master ===
If God is within us, the logical next question is, "How can we know him?" which leads to another important theme, the role of the master in the quest for higher knowledge:

O brother, my heart yearns for that true Guru, who fills the cup of true love, and drinks of it himself, and offers it then to me.
He removes the veil from the eyes, and gives the true Vision of Brahma.
(poem xxii)

=== The Insufficiency of Language ===
A third theme is the impossibility of expressing the experience of the divine in words:

He is neither manifest nor hidden, he is neither revealed nor unrevealed :
There are no words to tell that which He is.
(poem ix)

As a result, Kabir uses highly symbolic language throughout to describe divinity. It is represented by such terms as the "sky" (for the inner light), the "unstruck music", the "nectar", the "word", the "other shore", and in many other ways. In its more personal aspect, divinity is frequently represented as the "beloved" or "husband" to the "bride" or "lover" (devotee). "Home" is a frequent metaphor for the body of the individual (where divinity resides waiting to be discovered), while the "forest" is the world around us which distracts us from the path of knowledge.

=== Essential Oneness ===
Another recurring motif is the essential oneness of all things. In an ultimate sense, there is only the Infinite and everything exists within him and as a part of him. Duality, or the notion of separateness, is the "error" of this world:

I have known in my body the sport of the universe : I have escaped from the error of the world.
The inward and the outward are become as one sky, the Infinite and the finite are united : I am drunken with the sight of this All.
(poem xvii)

=== Other Characteristics ===
In addition to their spiritual themes, the poems in this collection explore love, devotion, social commentary, and humor, while conveying instructional intent primarily directed at Kabir's initiates, who shared his spiritual lineage and were positioned to interpret themes that may appear obscure to general readers.

== Sources ==
- Masterman, David (2020). Kabir Says. Los Angeles: Three Pigeons Publishing.
- Mishra, Vijay C. (1987). "Two Truths are Told: Tagore's Kabir". In Schomer, Karine; McLeod, William Hewat (eds.). The Sants: Studies in a Devotional Tradition of India. Berkeley Religious Studies Series. Motilal Banarsidass. ISBN 978-81-208-0277-3. OCLC 925707272.
- Tagore, Rabindranath (1915). Songs of Kabir. New York: Macmillan. ISBN 979-8-6501-4828-9.
