= Linda Hess =

American religious studies scholar

- Occupations: Academic; translator
- Awards: Guggenheim Fellowship (2010)

Academic background
- Education: Carleton College (BA); University of California, Berkeley (MA, PhD)
- Thesis: Studies in Kabir: Texts, Traditions, Styles and Skills (1980)
- Doctoral advisor: Michael N. Nagler

Academic work
- Discipline: Hindu studies; literary studies
- Sub-discipline: Kabir
- Institutions: Sonoma State University; University of California, Berkeley; University of California, Davis; Stanford University

Linda Beth Hess (born September 1942) is an American translator and academic. A 2010 Guggenheim Fellow, She has written several books on the mystic Kabir, including The Bijak of Kabir (1983) and Bodies of Song (2015). She has worked as part of the faculty of University of California, Berkeley, University of California, Davis, and Stanford University.

== Biography ==
Linda Hess was raised in California. Originally raised in Judaism, she became interested in Indian culture after reading the work of Emerson and Thoreau, as well as the Walt Whitman poem "Passage to India". Hess recalled: "I was looking for a good spiritual path in 1958… this was much before the fads of the 60s – hippies, Beatles etc.".

After working as an English lecturer at Elphinstone College from 1965 to 1966, Hess obtained a BA in English from Stanford University with great distinction and honors in humanities in 1968. She attended the University of California, Berkeley, where she obtained an MA and PhD (both in comparative literature) in 1974 and 1980 (respectively), and worked as a lecturer at Sonoma State University in 1973. Her doctoral dissertation Studies in Kabir: Texts, Traditions, Styles and Skills was advised by Michael N. Nagler.

After working as a visiting assistant professor at Barnard College and Dartmouth College in the 1980s, Hess worked as assistant professor in South and Southeast Asian studies at UC Berkeley from 1986 to 1994. She was a lecturer of religious studies at University of California, Davis from 1984 to 1985 and from 1995 to 1997. She moved to Stanford University in 1996 and was promoted to senior lecturer in 2008. She served as co-director of the Stanford Center for South Asia from 2006 to 2009.

Hess specializes in South Asian religion, particularly the mystic Kabir. Her interest in Kabir piqued after she centered her doctoral dissertation on his work, being drawn to both his "satirical literary narrative and his sharp criticism of both Hindus and Muslims for their sectarian delusions". She has published several books related to Kabir, including The Bijak of Kabir (1983), a translated volume of Kabir's poems which she did with Sukhdev Singh; Singing Emptiness (2009), a translated volume of Kumar Gandharva's nirguni bhajans; and Bodies of Song (2015), an ethnographic and analytical book on Kabir's oral tradition, which saw her visit Malwa for research. In 2010, she was awarded a Guggenheim Fellowship for her book Bodies of Song. She also appeared in the Shabnam Virmani documentary Chalo Hamara Des: Come to My Country.

Hess is a Sōtō Zen practitioner, having practiced at San Francisco Zen Center and Berkeley Zen Center.

== Works ==
- (translated with Shukdev Singh) The Bijak of Kabir (1983) (Note: Reviews of this book:)
- A Touch of Grace: Songs of Kabir (1994)
- Singing Emptiness: Kumar Gandharva Performs the Poetry of Kabir (2009)
- Bodies of Song: Kabir Oral Traditions and Performative Worlds in North India (2015) (Note: Reviews of this book:)
