= Kabir Says =

Anthology of poems by Kabir

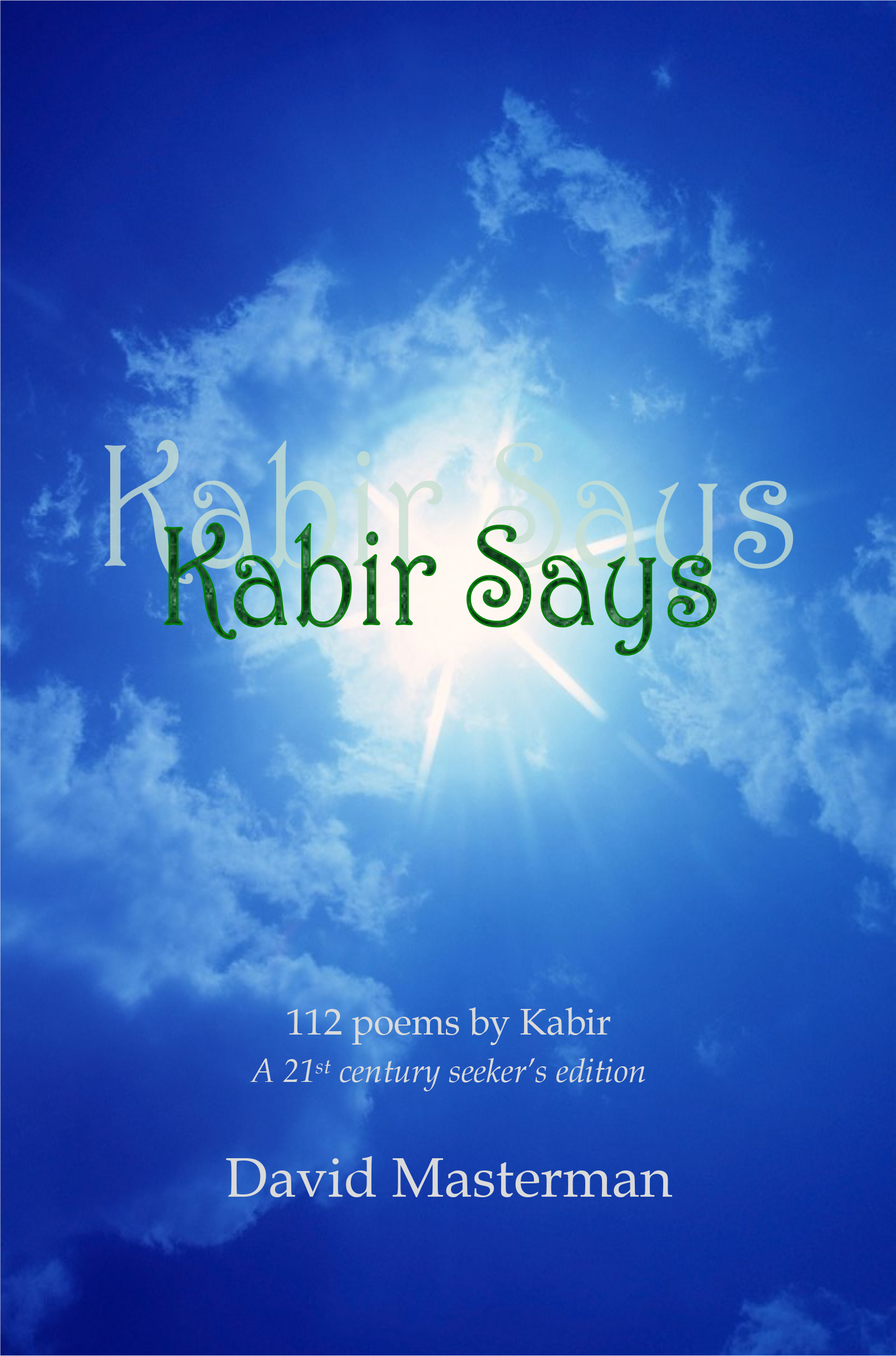
Front cover of Kabir Says

Kabir Says (Los Angeles : Three Pigeons, 2022) is an anthology of 112 poems based on the song lyrics of Kabir, a 15^{th} century spiritual master of northern India, with English poetic settings by David Masterman. The front cover describes it as a “21^{st} century seeker’s edition”. In addition to the poems, there is an introduction to Kabir and an appendix to assist the reader in interpreting the poems, which are often symbolic and abstruse.

== Kabir's life and spiritual lineage ==
According to Linda Hess and Sukhdev Singh in their introduction to the Bijak of Kabir, “There are volumes of legendary biography about Kabir, but the widely accepted ‘facts’ about his life can be summarized in a few sentences. He was born in Varanasi around the beginning of the fifteenth century in a class of weavers recently converted to Islam. He learned the family craft (later composing a number of poems with weaving metaphors), probably studied meditative and devotional practices with a Hindu guru, and developed into a powerful teacher and poet, unique in his autonomy, intensity, and abrasiveness.”

If it is hard to pin down the details of his life, “anchoring Kabir in a lineage that will serve to define him”, as John Hawley puts it, is equally difficult and he consistently confounds attempts to categorize him. He is sometimes described as a bhakti poet, but as Robert Bly says, “There’s very little one can say about the bhakti tradition that doesn’t diminish it” and a clear definition of bhakti is hard to find.

The word bhakti means devotion. But devotion is a common word, so the question becomes: What does devotion mean in this context? In fact, Kabir does not use the word in these poems, but the idea of devotion is certainly present in the abstract in connection with receiving and practicing the knowledge of the soul: “By continual and sustained practice, this knowledge penetrates the mind and senses thoroughly, changing our behavior. Then divine wisdom becomes our very nature. The only way to do this is to first find that knowledge which can show us God as he really is, meditate with deep love upon it, and unite the mind with God. This path has been practiced since ancient times and is called the path of devotion.”

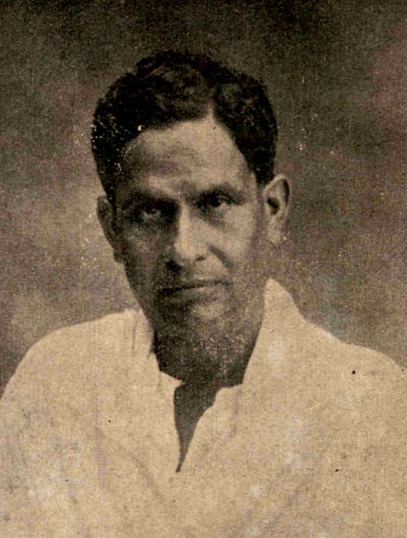
Kshiti Mohan Sen (1938)

We can conclude from this that bhakti is essentially a practical path. Its object is not an accumulation of facts, ideas, and beliefs, but a personal experience of divinity. “There, the learned are silent,” says Kabir, “for this truth cannot be found in books” (poem 104).

== Important themes ==
Notwithstanding Kabir’s resistance to being anchored in “a lineage that will serve to define him,” certain themes are self-evident:

“Kabir played down the importance of both ritual and austerity, teaching that God is not confined to mosques, temples, or sites of pilgrimage, but is manifested everywhere in creation. Most importantly, God is within us, and this is where we must look if we seek to know him.”

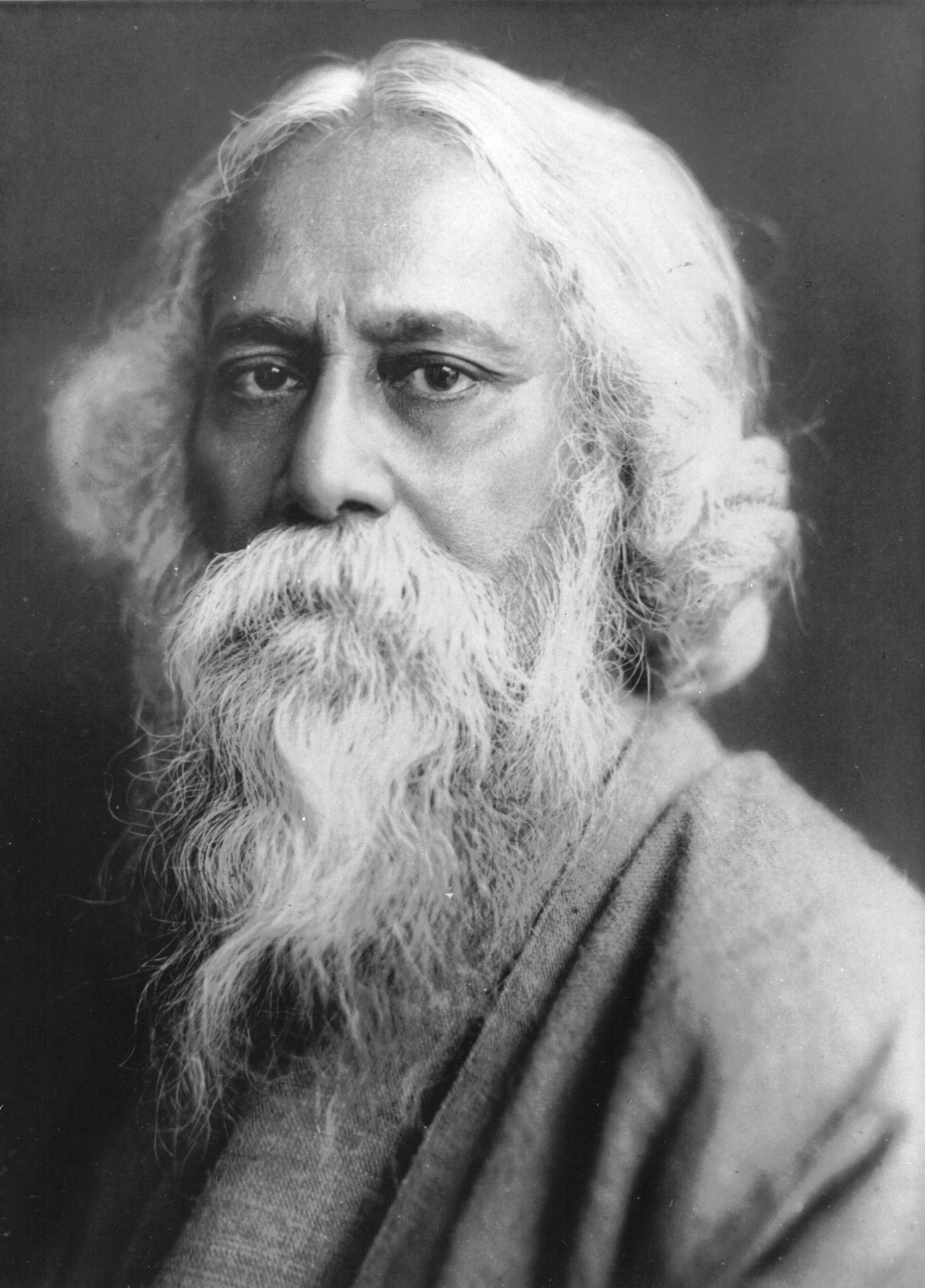
Rabindranath Tagore (date unknown)

However, “The shaping of our own destinies does not preclude receiving help from outside” and another significant theme is that we cannot know the spark of divinity within ourselves without the initiation and guidance of a qualified spiritual master: “The master removes the veil, imparts the vision of God” (poem 22). Kabir only mentions his own teacher by name on one occasion, but we are frequently reminded of the importance of the master in the seeker’s life and several poems concern the master exclusively (e.g. 9, 22, and 105).

Another recurring motif is that no words can adequately describe the experience of divinity: “It is other than all that is said – how can I describe it?” (poem 75). Kabir has constant recourse to symbolism in attempting to convey what cannot be expressed in language. Yet by means of his colorful imagery, he succeeds in giving us a glimpse into the realm of the spirit – “a world of beauty, majesty, even romance, where the relationship between lovers is a frequent metaphor for our relationship to the divine.”

== Background of Kabir Says ==
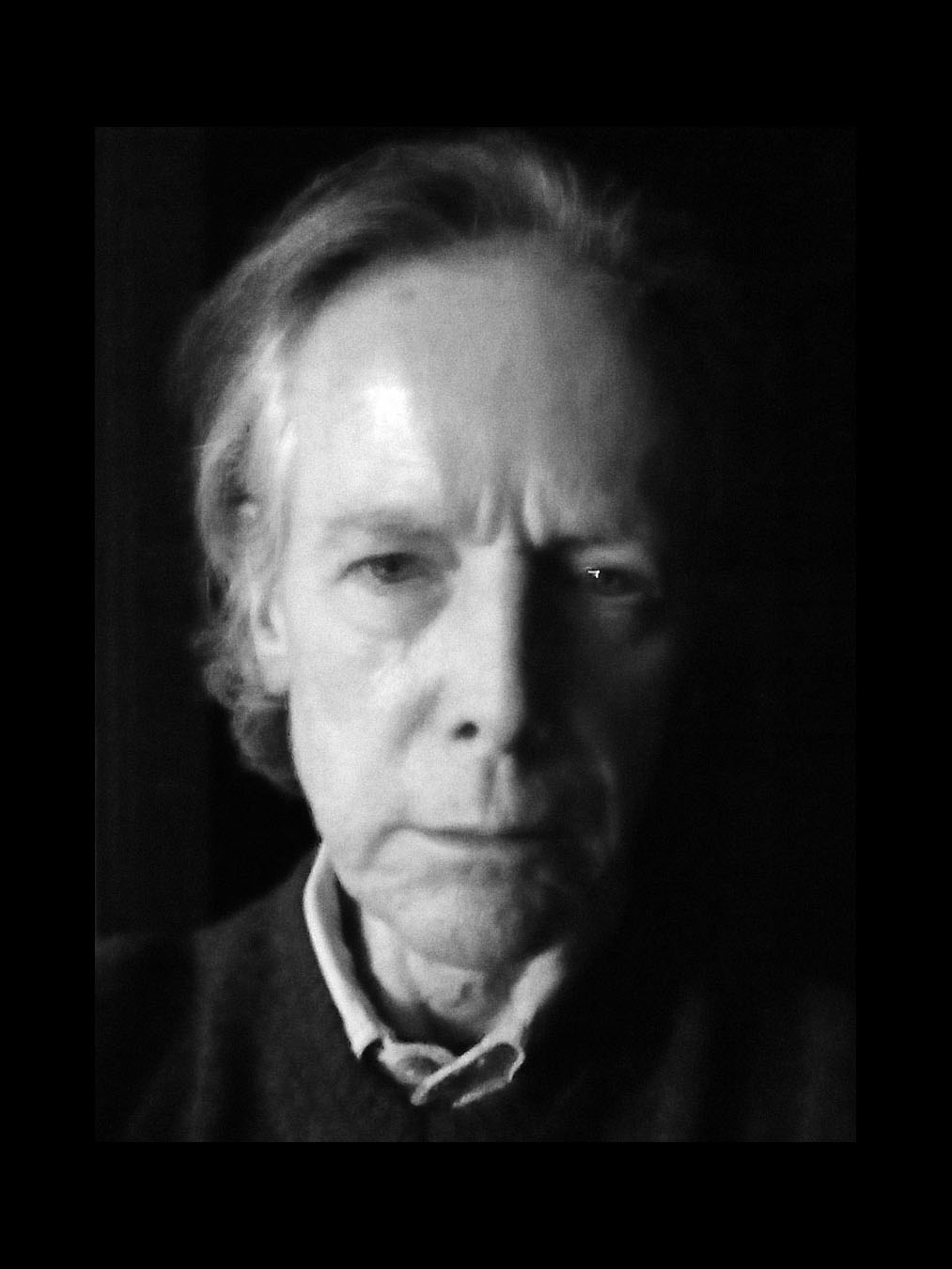
David Masterman (2026)

The poems in Kabir Says have been drawn from the collection of Kshiti Mohan Sen (1880-1960), an author, scholar and teacher who gathered “sometimes from books and manuscripts, sometimes from the lips of wandering ascetics and minstrels – a large collection of poems and hymns to which Kabir’s name is attached, and carefully sifted the authentic songs from the many spurious works now attributed to him.” From Sen’s collection, Rabindranath Tagore (1861-1941), a Nobel prize-winning author, selected poems for a first translation of Kabir into English, which was published in 1915. The contribution of these two individuals cannot be overstated.

David Masterman (b. 1954), who “has graduate degrees in literature and theology and for many years has practiced the techniques of self-knowledge,” has based this version on Tagore’s translation. However, the language and format of that first English version are outdated by today’s standards, and a close textual analysis reveals numerous issues, e.g. archaic KJV-style language, different poems combined under the same heading, misplaced fragments, misuse of terms, Indian terms that are unfamiliar to Western readers, etc. These issues have been resolved in Kabir Says.

An example of Kabir's poetry as rendered in Kabir Says
