= Evelyn Underhill =

English writer, theologian, retreat leader and pacifist (1875–1941)

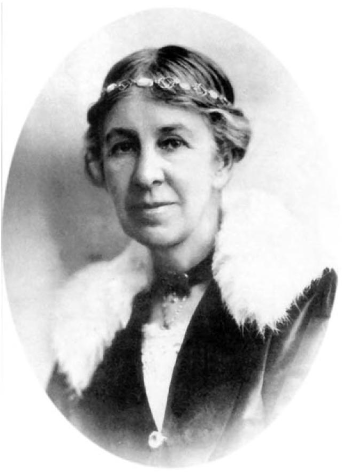
- Born: 6 December 1875; Wolverhampton, England
- Died: 15 June 1941 (aged 65); London, England
- Occupations: Novelist, writer, mystic
- Writing career
- Genres: Christian mysticism, spirituality
- Notable work: Mysticism (1911)

Evelyn Underhill (6 December 1875 – 15 June 1941) was an English Anglo-Catholic writer and pacifist known for her numerous works on religion and spiritual practice, in particular Christian mysticism. Her best-known work is Mysticism, published in 1911.

== Life ==
Underhill was born in Wolverhampton. She was a poet and novelist as well as a pacifist and mystic. An only child, she described her early mystical insights as "abrupt experiences of the peaceful, undifferentiated plane of reality—like the 'still desert' of the mystic—in which there was no multiplicity nor need of explanation". The meaning of these experiences became a lifelong quest and a source of private angst, provoking her to research and write.

As an only child, she was devoted to her parents and, later, to her husband. She was fully engaged in the life of a barrister's daughter and wife, including the entertainment and charitable work that entailed, and pursued a daily regimen that included writing, research, worship, prayer and meditation. It was a fundamental axiom of hers that all of life was sacred, as that was what "incarnation" was about.

She was a cousin of Francis Underhill, Bishop of Bath and Wells.

Both her father, Arthur Underhill, and her husband, Hubert Stuart Moore, were writers (on the law), London barristers, and yachtsmen. She and her husband grew up together and were married on 3 July 1907. The couple had no children. She traveled regularly within Europe, primarily to Switzerland, France and Italy, where she pursued her interests in art and Catholicism, visiting numerous churches and monasteries. Neither her husband (a Protestant) nor her parents shared her interest in spiritual matters.

Moore was a prolific author who published over 30 books either under her maiden name, Underhill, or under the pseudonym "John Cordelier", such as the 1912 book The Spiral Way. Initially an agnostic, she gradually began to acquire an interest in Neoplatonism and from there was increasingly drawn to Catholicism against the objections of her husband. She eventually became a prominent Anglo-Catholic. From 1921 to 1924, her spiritual mentor was Baron Friedrich von Hügel, who appreciated her writing yet concerned with her focus on mysticism and who encouraged her to adopt a much more Christocentric view as opposed to the theistic and intellectual one she had previously held. She described him as "the most wonderful personality. ... so saintly, truthful, sane and tolerant" (Cropper, p. 44) and was influenced by him toward more charitable and down-to-earth activities. After his death in 1925, her writings became more focused on the Holy Spirit and she became prominent in the Anglican Church as a lay leader of spiritual retreats, a spiritual director for hundreds of individuals, guest speaker, radio lecturer and proponent of contemplative prayer.

Underhill came of age in the Edwardian era and, like many contemporaries, had a decided romantic bent with interests in the psychic, the psychological, the occult, the mystical, the medieval, the advance of science, the apotheosis of art, the rediscovery of the feminine, the unashamedly sensuous, and the most ethereally "spiritual". Anglicanism seemed to her out-of-key with this. She sought the centre of life as not in the state religion, but in experience and the heart. This age of "the soul" was one of those periods when a sudden easing of social taboos brings on a great sense of personal emancipation and desire for an El Dorado despised by an older, more morose and insensitive generation.

=== Education ===
Underhill was educated at home, except for three years at a private school in Folkestone, and subsequently read history and botany at King's College London. An honorary Doctorate of Divinity was conferred on her by Aberdeen University and she was made a fellow of King's College. She was the first woman to lecture to the clergy in the Church of England and the first woman officially to conduct spiritual retreats for the church. She was also the first woman to establish ecumenical links between churches and one of the first woman theologians to lecture in English colleges and universities, which she did frequently. Underhill was an award-winning bookbinder, studying with the most renowned masters of the time. She was schooled in the classics, well read in Western spirituality, well informed (in addition to theology) in the philosophy, psychology, and physics of her day, and was a writer and reviewer for The Spectator.

=== Early work ===
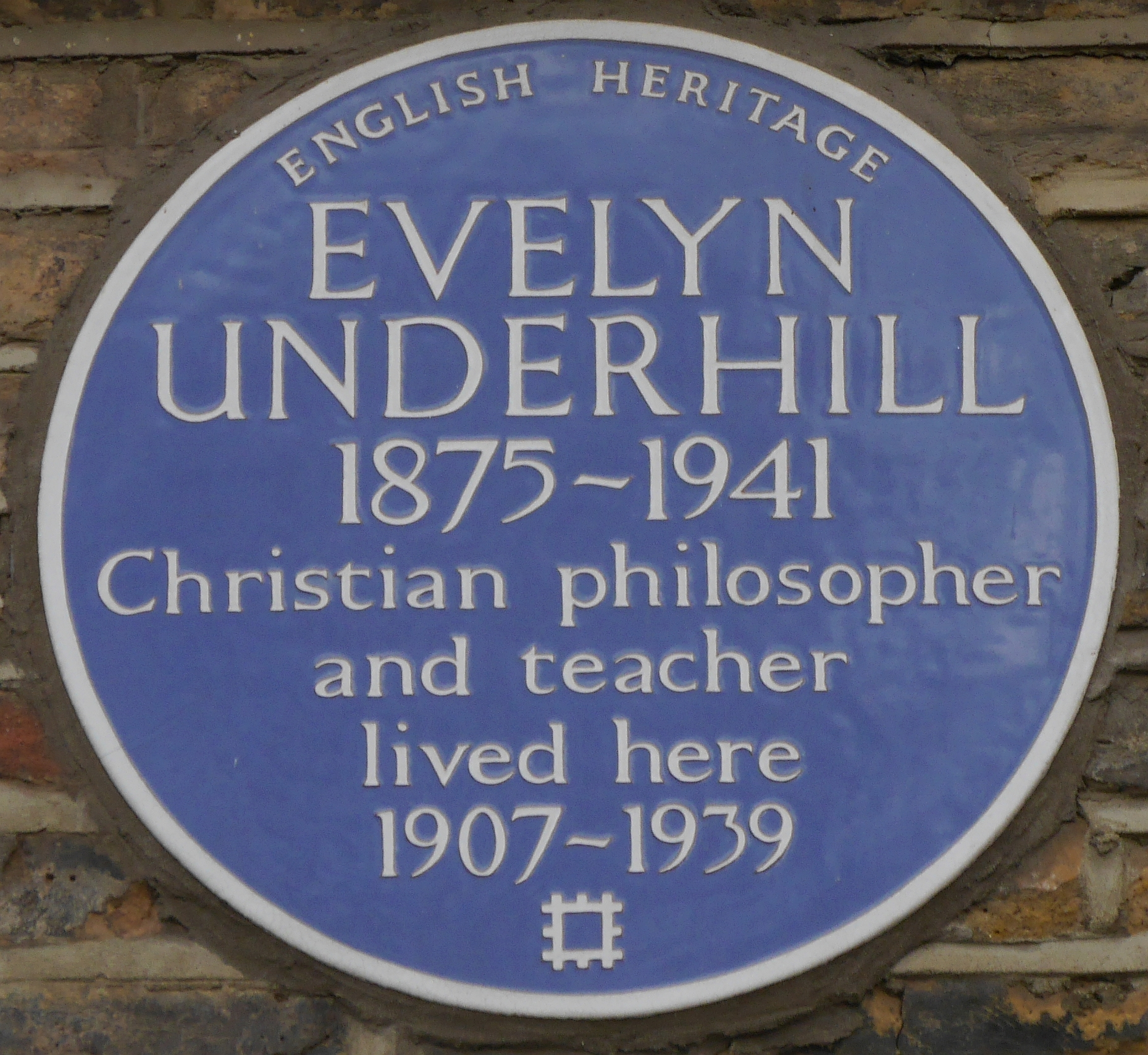
Blue plaque, 50 Campden Hill Square, London

Before undertaking many of her better-known expository works on mysticism, she first published a small book of satirical poems on legal dilemmas, The Bar-Lamb's Ballad Book, which received a favourable welcome. Underhill then wrote three unconventional, though profoundly spiritual novels. Like Charles Williams and, later, Susan Howatch, Underhill used her narratives to explore the sacramental intersection of the physical with the spiritual. She then uses that sacramental framework effectively to illustrate the unfolding of a human drama. Her novels are entitled The Grey World (1904), The Lost Word (1907), and The Column of Dust (1909). In her first novel, The Grey World, described by one reviewer as an extremely interesting psychological study, the hero's mystical journey begins with death, and then moves through reincarnation, beyond the grey world, and into the choice of a simple life devoted to beauty, reflecting Underhill's own serious perspective as a young woman.

It seems so much easier in these days to live morally than to live beautifully. Lots of us manage to exist for years without ever sinning against society, but we sin against loveliness every hour of the day.

The Lost Word and The Column of Dust are also concerned with the problem of living in two worlds and reflect the writer's own spiritual challenges. In the 1909 novel, her heroine encounters a rift in the solid stuff of her universe:

She had seen, abruptly, the insecurity of those defences which protect our illusions and ward off the horrors of truth. She had found a little hole in the wall of appearances; and peeping through, had caught a glimpse of that seething pot of spiritual forces whence, now and then, a bubble rises to the surface of things.

Underhill's novels suggest that perhaps for the mystic, two worlds may be better than one. For her, mystical experience seems inseparable from some kind of enhancement of consciousness or expansion of perceptual and aesthetic horizons—to see things as they are, in their meanness and insignificance when viewed in opposition to the divine reality, but in their luminosity and grandeur when seen bathed in divine radiance. But at this stage the mystic's mind is subject to fear and insecurity, its powers undeveloped. The first novel takes us only to this point. Further stages demand suffering, because mysticism is more than merely vision or cultivating a latent potentiality of the soul in cosy isolation. According to Underhill's view, the subsequent pain and tension, and final loss of the private painful ego-centered life for the sake of regaining one's true self, has little to do with the first beatific vision. Her two later novels are built on the ideal of total self-surrender even to the apparent sacrifice of the vision itself, as necessary for the fullest possible integration of human life. This was for her the equivalent of working out within, the metaphorical intent of the life story of Jesus. One is reunited with the original vision—no longer as mere spectator but as part of it. This dimension of self-loss and resurrection is worked out in The Lost Word, but there is some doubt as to its general inevitability. In The Column of Dust, the heroine's physical death reinforces dramatically the mystical death to which she has already surrendered. Two lives are better than one but only on the condition that a process of painful re-integration intervenes to re-establish unity between Self and Reality.

All her characters derive their origins from the theological meaning and values that they represent. It is through her ingenious handling of this symbolic material that makes her work psychologically interesting and serve as a model for 20th-century writers like Susan Howatch, whose successful novels embody the same psychological value of religious metaphor and the traditions of Christian mysticism. Her first novel received critical acclaim, but her last was generally not well received. Her novels give insight into what we may assume was her decision to avoid what St Augustine described as the temptation of fuga in solitudinem ("the flight into solitude"), but to instead manifesting to a loving, positive acceptance of this world. It was however by this time, that she was already working on her magnum opus.

== Writings on religion ==
=== Mysticism (1911) ===
Underhill's book, Mysticism: A Study of the Nature and Development of Man's Spiritual Consciousness, was published in 1911. The spirit of the book is romantic, engaged, and theoretical rather than historical or scientific. Underhill has little use for theoretical explanations and the traditional religious experience, formal classifications or analysis. She dismisses William James's The Varieties of Religious Experience (1902), and his "four marks of the mystic state" (ineffability, noetic quality, transience, and passivity). James had admitted that his own constitution shut him off almost entirely from the enjoyment of mystical states, thus his treatment was purely objective. Underhill substituted (1) mysticism is practical, not theoretical, (2) mysticism is an entirely spiritual activity, (3) the business and method of mysticism is love, and (4) mysticism entails a definite psychological experience. Her insistence on the psychological approach was that it was the glamorous science of the pre-war period, offering the potential key to the secrets of human advances in intelligence, creativity, and genius, and already psychological findings were being applied in theology (i.e., William Sanday's Christologies Ancient and Modern).

She divided her subject into two parts: the first, an introduction, and the second, a detailed study of the nature and development of human consciousness. In the first section, in order to free the subject of mysticism from confusion and misapprehension, she approached it from the point of view of the psychologist, the symbolist and the theologian. To separate mysticism from its most dubious connection, she included a chapter on mysticism and magic. Mysticism has been associated with the occult, magic, secret rites, and fanaticism, while she knew the mystics throughout history to be the world's spiritual pioneers.

=== Ruysbroeck (1914) ===
A work by Evelyn Underhill on the 14th-century Flemish mystic Jan van Ruusbroec (1293–1381), entitled Ruysbroeck, was published in London in 1914. She had discussed him from several different perspectives during the course of her 1911 book on Mysticism.

=== "The Mysticism of Plotinus" (1919) ===
An essay originally published in The Quarterly Review (1919), and later collected in The Essentials of Mysticism and other essays (London: J. M. Dent 1920) at pp. 116–140. Underhill here addresses Plotinus (204–270) of Alexandria and later of Rome.

=== Worship (1936) ===
In her preface, the author disclaims being "a liturgical expert". Neither is it her purpose to offer criticism of the different approaches to worship as practiced by the various religious bodies. Rather she endeavors to show "the love that has gone to their adornment [and] the shelter they can offer to many different kinds of adoring souls." She begins chapter one by declaring that "Worship, in all its grades and kinds, is the response of the creature to the Eternal: nor need we limit this definition to the human sphere. ...we may think of the whole of the Universe, seen and unseen, conscious and unconscious, as an act of worship."

The chapter headings give an indication of their contents.

- Part I: 1. The Nature of Worship, 2. Ritual and Symbol, 3. Sacrament and Sacrifice, 4. The Character of Christian Worship, 5. Principles of Corporate Worship, 6. Liturgical Elements in Worship, 7. The Holy Eucharist: Its Nature, 8. The Holy Eucharist: Its Significance, 9. The Principles of Personal Worship.
- Part II: 10. Jewish Worship, 11. The Beginnings of Christian Worship, 12. Catholic Worship: Western and Eastern, 13. Worship in the Reformed Churches, 14. Free Church Worship, 15. The Anglican Tradition. Conclusion.

== Influences ==
Underhill's life was greatly affected by her husband's resistance to Christianity, to which she was powerfully drawn. She committed to the Christian faith the first year of her marriage and was drawn to the Catholic Church, but never converted. She fully reconciled her decision to remain in the Anglican Church in 1921 when she became a practicing member of the Church of England, an affiliation she held until the end of her life. Her husband was a writer himself and was supportive of her writing both before and after their marriage in 1907, though he did not share her spiritual affinities. Her fiction was written in the six years of 1903–1909 and represents her four major interests of that general period: philosophy (neoplatonism), theism/mysticism, the Catholic liturgy, and human love/compassion. In her earlier writings Underhill often wrote using the terms "mysticism" and "mystics" but later began to adopt the terms "spirituality" and "saints" because she felt they were less threatening. She was often criticized for believing that the mystical life should be accessible to the average person.

Her fiction was also influenced by the literary creed expounded by her close friend Arthur Machen, mainly his Hieroglyphics of 1902, summarised by his biographer:

There are certain truths about the universe and its constitution – as distinct from the particular things in it that come before our observation – which cannot be grasped by human reason or expressed in precise words: but they can be apprehended by some people at least, in a semi-mystical experience, called ecstasy, and a work of art is great insofar as this experience is caught and expressed in it. Because, however, the truths concerned transcend a language attuned to the description of material objects, the expression can only be through hieroglyphics, and it is of such hieroglyphics that literature consists.

In Underhill's case the quest for psychological realism is subordinate to larger metaphysical considerations which she shared with Arthur Machen. Incorporating the Holy Grail into their fiction (stimulated perhaps by their association with Arthur Waite and his affiliation with the Hermetic Order of the Golden Dawn), for Machen the Holy Grail was perhaps "the" hieroglyph, "the" crystallisation in one sacred emblem of all man's transcendental yearning, "the" gateway to vision and lasting appeasement of his discontents, while for her it was the center of atonement-linked meanings.

Two contemporary philosophical writers dominated Underhill's thinking at the time she wrote "Mysticism": Rudolf Eucken and Henri Bergson. While neither displayed an interest in mysticism, both seemed to their disciples to advance a spiritual explanation of the universe. Also, she describes the fashionable creed of the time as "vitalism" and the term adequately sums up the prevailing worship of life in all its exuberance, variety and limitless possibility which pervaded pre-war culture and society. For her, Eucken and Bergson confirmed the deepest intuitions of the mystics.

Among the mystics, Ruysbroeck was to her the most influential and satisfying of all the medieval mystics, and she found herself very close to him in the years when he was working as an unknown priest in Brussels.

His career which covers the greater part of the fourteenth century, that golden age of Christian Mysticism, seems to exhibit within the circle of a single personality, and carry up to a higher term than ever before, all the best attainments of the Middle Ages in the realm of Eternal life. The central doctrine of the Divine Fatherhood, and of the soul's power to become the Son of God, it is this raised to the nth degree of intensity ... and demonstrated with the exactitude of the mathematician, and the passion of a poet, which Ruysbroeck gives us ... the ninth and tenth chapters of The Sparkling Stone the high water mark of mystical literature. Nowhere else do we find such a combination of soaring vision with the most delicate and intimate psychological analysis. The old Mystic sitting under his tree, seems here to be gazing at and reporting to us the final secrets of that Eternal World... (Cropper, p. 57)

One of her most significant influences and important collaborations was with the Nobel Laureate, Rabindranath Tagore, the Indian mystic, author, and world traveller. They published a major translation of the work of Kabir (100 Poems of Kabir, called Songs of Kabir) together in 1915, to which she wrote the introduction. He introduced her to the spiritual genius of India which she expressed enthusiastically in a letter:

This is the first time I have had the privilege of being with one who is a Master in the things I care so much about but know so little of as yet: & I understand now something of what your writers mean when they insist on the necessity and value of the personal teacher and the fact that he gives something which the learner cannot get in any other way. It has been like hearing the language of which I barely know the alphabet, spoken perfectly. (Letters)

They did not keep up their correspondence in later years. Both suffered debilitating illnesses in the last year of life and died in the summer of 1941, greatly distressed by the outbreak of World War II.

In 1921, Underhill was asked by the University of Oxford to give the first of a new series of lectures on religion, and she was the first woman to do so. She was considered an authority on the subject of mysticism. Additionally, her works were in demand, and she was not lacking in terms of interpersonal relationships. However, she felt that her foundations were insecure and that her zeal for Reality was resting on a basis that was too fragile.

By 1939, she was a member of the Anglican Pacifist Fellowship, writing a number of important tracts expressing her anti-war sentiment.

After converting to Anglicanism, and perhaps overwhelmed by her knowledge of the achievements of the mystics and their perilous heights, her ten-year friendship with Catholic philosopher and writer Baron Friedrich von Hügel turned into one of spiritual direction. Charles Williams wrote in his introduction to her Letters: "The equal (or all but equal) swaying level of devotion and scepticism which is, for some souls, as much the Way as continuous simple faith is to others, was a distress to her. ... She wanted to be sure." She wrote to Von Hügel about the darkness she was struggling with.

Surviving the London Blitz of 1940, her health disintegrated further and she died in the following year. She is buried with her husband in the churchyard extension at St John-at-Hampstead in London.

She helped introduce the authors of medieval and Catholic spirituality to a largely Protestant audience and the lives of eastern mystics to the English-speaking world. As a frequent guest on radio, her 1936 work The Spiritual Life was especially influential as transcribed from a series of broadcasts given as a sequel to those by Dom Bernard Clements on the subject of prayer. Fellow theologian Charles Williams wrote the introduction to her published Letters in 1943, which reveal much about this prodigious woman. Upon her death, The Times reported that on the subject of theology, she was "unmatched by any of the professional teachers of her day."

== Veneration ==
Evelyn Underhill is honoured on 15 June in the liturgical calendars of several Anglican churches, including those of the Anglican Church of Australia, the Anglican Church in Aotearoa, New Zealand and Polynesia, the Episcopal Anglican Church of Brazil, the Church of England, the Episcopal Church in the United States of America, and the Anglican Church in North America.

== Publications ==
=== Poetry ===
- The Bar-Lamb's Ballad Book (1902). Online
- Immanence (1916). Online
- Theophanies (1916). Online

=== Novels ===
- The Grey World (1904). Reprint Kessinger Publishing, 1942: ISBN 0-7661-0158-4. Online
- The Lost Word (1907).
- The Column of Dust (1909). Online

=== Religion (non-fiction) ===
- The Miracles of Our Lady Saint Mary: Brought Out of Divers Tongues and Newly Set Forth in English (1906) Online
- Mysticism: A Study of the Nature and Development of Man's Spiritual Consciousness (1911). Twelfth edition published by E. P. Dutton in 1930. Republished by Dover Publications in 2002 (ISBN 978-0-486-42238-1). See also online editions at Christian Classics Ethereal Library and at Wikisource
- The Path of Eternal Wisdom. A mystical commentary on the Way of the Cross (1912)
- "Introduction" to her edition of the anonymous The Cloud of Unknowing (c. 1370) from the British Library manuscript [here entitled A Book of Contemplation the which is called the Cloud of Unknowing, in the which a Soul is oned with God] (London: John M. Walkins 1912); reprinted as Cloud of Unknowing (1998) [her "Introduction" at 5–37]; 2007: ISBN 1-60506-228-6; see her text at Google books
- The Spiral Way. Being a meditation on the fifteen mysteries of the soul's ascent (1912)
- The Mystic Way. A psychological study of Christian origins (1914). Online
- Practical Mysticism. A Little Book for Normal People (1914); reprint 1942 (ISBN 0-7661-0141-X); reprinted by Vintage Books, New York 2003 [with Abba (1940)]: ISBN 0-375-72570-9; see text at Wikisource.
- Ruysbroeck (London: Bell 1915). Online
- "Introduction" to Songs of Kabir (1915) transl. by Rabindranath Tagore; reprint 1977 Samuel Weiser (ISBN 0-87728-271-4), text at 5–43
- The Essentials of Mysticism and other essays (1920); another collection of her essays with the same title 1995, reprint 1999 (ISBN 1-85168-195-7)
- The Life of the Spirit and the Life of Today (1920). Online
- The Mystics of the Church (1925)
- Concerning the Inner Life (1927); reprint 1999 (ISBN 1-85168-194-9) Online
- Man and the Supernatural. A study in theism (1927)
- The House of the Soul (1929)
- The Light of Christ (1932)
- The Golden Sequence. A fourfold study of the spiritual life (1933)
- The School of Charity. Meditations on the Christian Creed (1934); reprinted by Longmans, London 1954 [with M.of S. (1938)]
- Worship (1936)
- The Spiritual Life (1936); reprint 1999 (ISBN 1-85168-197-3); see also online edition
- The Mystery of Sacrifice. A study on the liturgy (1938); reprinted by Longmans, London 1954 [with S.of C. (1934)]
- Abba. A meditation on the Lord's Prayer (1940); reprint 2003 [with Practical Mysticism (1914)]
- The Letters of Evelyn Underhill (1943), as edited by Charles Williams; reprint Christian Classics 1989: ISBN 0-87061-172-0
- Shrines and Cities of France and Italy (1949), as edited by Lucy Menzies
- Fragments from an inner life. Notebooks of Evelyn Underhill (1993), as edited by Dana Greene
- The Mysticism of Plotinus (2005) Kessinger offprint, 48 pages. Taken from The Essentials of Mysticism (1920)

=== Anthologies ===
- Fruits of the Spirit (1942) edited by R. L. Roberts; reprint 1982, ISBN 0-8192-1314-4
- The letters of Evelyn Underhill (1943) edited with an intro. by Charles Williams
- Collected Papers of Evelyn Underhill (1946) edited by L. Menzies and introduced by L. Barkway
- Lent with Evelyn Underhill (1964) edited by G. P. Mellick Belshaw
- An Anthology of the Love of God. From the writings of Evelyn Underhill (1976) edited by L. Barkway and L. Menzies
- The Ways of the Spirit (1990) edited by G. A. Brame; reprint 1993, ISBN 0-8245-1232-4
- Evelyn Underhill. Modern guide to the ancient quest for the Holy (1988) edited and introduced by D. Greene
- Evelyn Underhill. Essential writings (2003) edited by E. Griffin
- Radiance: A Spiritual Memoir (2004) edited by Bernard Bangley, ISBN 1-55725-355-2
- Then May the Senses Fall: Evelyn Underhill's Forgotten Fiction (2025), edited by William Gillard and Robert Stauffer, ISBN 9781958972953

== See also ==
- List of peace activists
- John of the Cross
