= Practical Mysticism =

Book by Evelyn Underhill

Practical Mysticism is a book by Anglo-Catholic writer and pacifist Evelyn Underhill and first published in 1915. In this book Underhill sets out her belief that spiritual life is part of human nature and as such is available to every human being. Underhill's practical mysticism is secular rather than religious, since "it is a natural human activity."

In the following paragraph, Underhill defines the meaning of the phrase "Practical Mysticism":

Therefore it is to a practical mysticism that the practical man is here invited: to a training of his latent faculties, a bracing and brightening of his languid consciousness, an emancipation from the fetters of appearance, a turning of his attention to new levels of the world. Thus he may become aware of the universe that the spiritual artist is always trying to disclose to the race. This amount of mystical perception---this 'ordinary contemplation', as the specialist call it,---is possible to all men: without it, they are not wholly alive. It is a natural human activity

Underhill's book was written at the outbreak of World War I, at a time of "struggle and endurance, practical sacrifices, difficult and long continuous effort" when, she believed, practical mysticism was the activity needed most.
