= Home in the World =

2021 memoir by Amartya Sen

- Author: Amartya Sen
- Publisher: Allen Lane
- Publication date: 8 July 2021
- ISBN: 978-1-846-14486-8

Home in the World is a memoir by Nobel laureate Amartya Sen, published in 2021. It is a partial autobiography in that it covers the first three decades of his life, mostly ending with 1963, when he returns to India after living abroad for a decade.

Sen writes about his childhood, the time he spent in Dhaka, Mandalay, his connections with Santiniketan, history of his family, intellectual history of India, his student days at the Presidency College, Kolkata, his coming to Cambridge as a student after being diagnosed with and then getting cured from a deadly oral cancer, his student days in Cambridge, his days as a teacher at the Delhi School of Economics, among other things. It is notable that almost two third of the book is about his roots, childhood and the time he spent in India before he arrived in Cambridge at the age of twenty.

Rather than focussing his life as it unfolded, the book often takes the reader into engaging detours when he discusses people who interested him; these include his maternal grandfather Kshiti Mohan Sen, Rabindra Natha Tagore, Aung San Sun Kyi, Ludwig Wittgenstein, Wittgenstein's close associate and Sen's mentor at Cambridge Piero Sraffa, Isaiah Berlin, economists Kenneth Arrow, Paul Samuelson, Mahbub ul Haq, and Maurice Dobb. In fact, the author shies away from describing his personal life in much detail and is remarkably laconic about his own achievements. Even as he writes about Mahbub ul Haq’s creation for the United Nations of a Human Development Index and annual report, he does not write about his own significant contributions to them. The style is simple and engaging, compared to what is employed by Sen in his economic and philosophic works.

The book is divided into five parts and 26 chapters and is dedicated to his wife Emma Rothschild.
