= Dharamdas =

Poet and Disciple of Kabir

Dhani Dharamdas
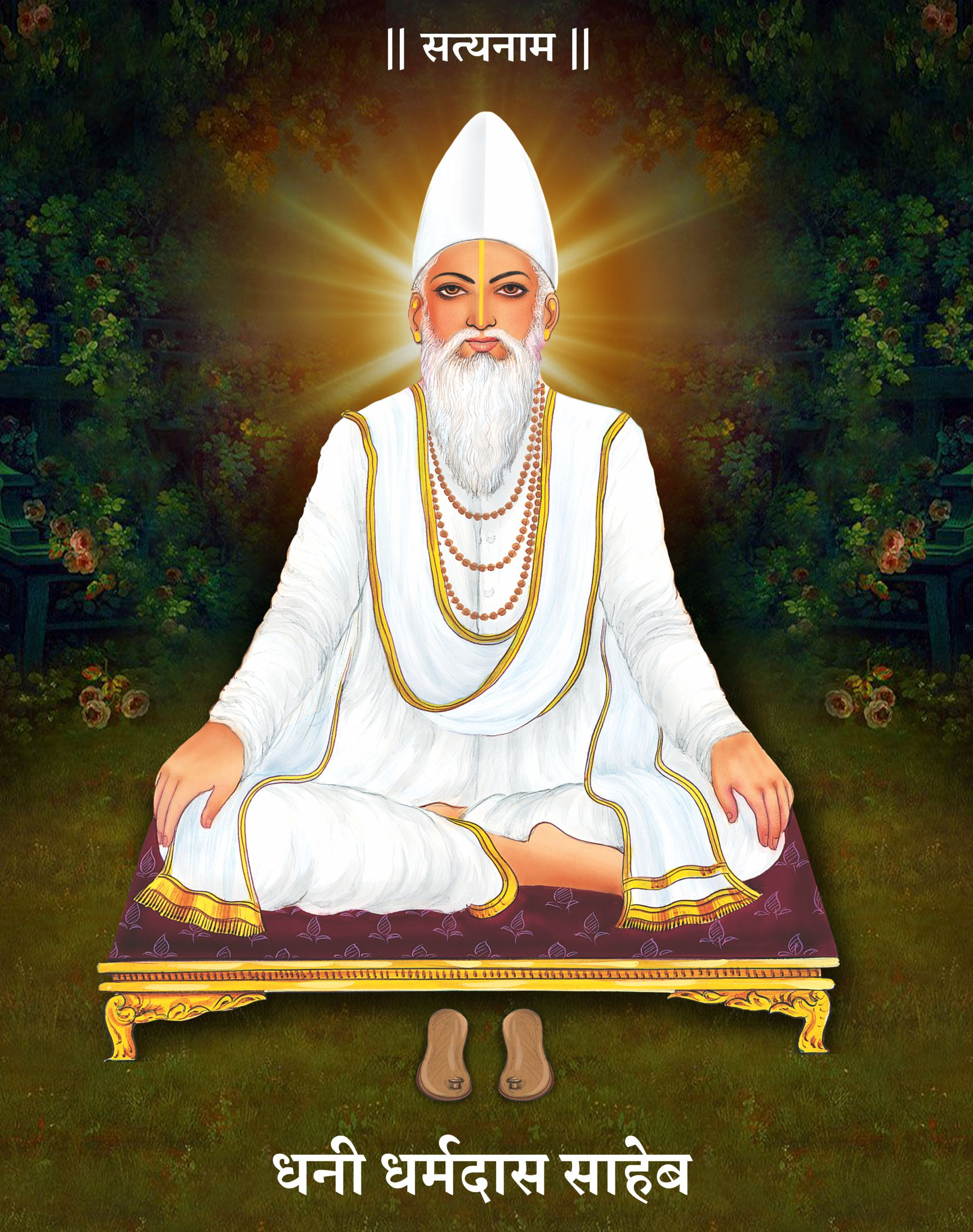
- Dhani Dharamdas Saheb, the chief disciple of Kabir Saheb and the founder of the Kabir Panth.

Personal life
- Born: Bandhavgarh, Rewa State (present-day Madhya Pradesh, India) birth year Vikram Samvat 1452 (c. 1395 CE).
- Parent: Manmahesh (father)

Religious life
- Religion: Kabirpanth

Senior posting
- Teacher: Kabir

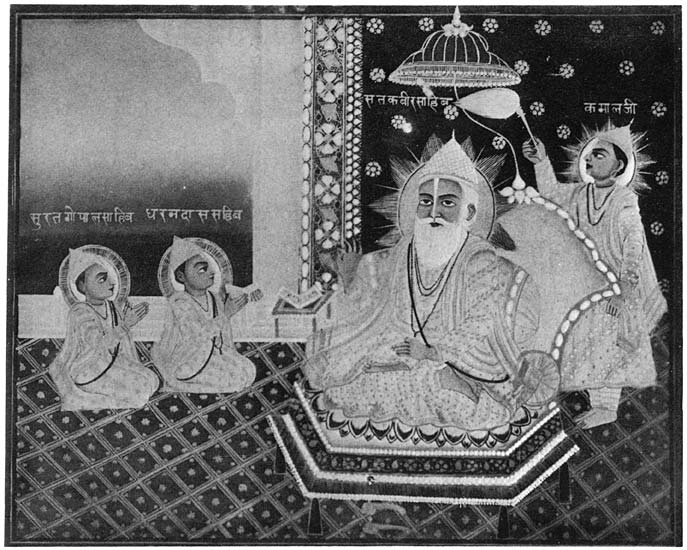
Painting of Kabir (seated near the centre of the frame), his disciple Kamal (fly-whisk attendant; standing to the right), and two of his disciples, namely Dharam Das (seated right) and Suratigopal (seated left)

Dhani Dharamdas was an Indian saint and a Bhojpuri poet, also revered as the 'Aadi Kavi' (first poet) of Chhattisgarh, and a prominent disciple of Kabir saheb . It is said that after becoming Kabir's disciple, he gave away all his rich possessions. Followers of Dharamdas are known as Kabirpanthi.

== Life ==
Dhani Dharamdas was a prominent saint of the Nirguna tradition of Kabir and played a pivotal role in propagating the Kabir Panth. He is revered as the chief disciple of Kabir Saheb and the primary founder of the Kabir Panth. According to Dr. Ram Ratan Bhatnagar, "Dharamdas is the founder of the Kabir Panth.

Dhani Dharamdas was born in Samvat 1452 (Vikram Era) into a prosperous Vaishya family in Bandhavgarh, which was then part of the Rewa state (present-day Umaria district, Madhya Pradesh) to his father, Manmahesh. He was married in Samvat 1480 to Sulakshanawati of Patharhat, who is known as 'Amin Mata' in the Kabir Panth tradition. In Samvat 1520, in Bandhavgarh, he and his wife received initiation (Diksha) from Sadguru Kabir Saheb in the presence of a vast congregation. Pleased by his immense devotion, Kabir Saheb appointed him as his primary successor and blessed the lineage of the Kabir Panth to continue under his guidance for 'Atal Bayalis Vansha' (the eternal forty-two lineages). It is said that after becoming a disciple of Kabir Saheb, he gave away all his rich possessions. Dharamdas made two gurus in his life: the first Guru was Roopdas and the second Guru was Kabir Saheb. He had two sons, the first son was Narayan Das who opposed Kabir's knowledge and the second son was Chudamani (Muktamani).

=== Spiritual journey ===
Since childhood, he was very religious. He used to like attending Satsang, Puja, pilgrimages, etc. Earlier, he used to worship idols.One day he met with Kabir. Both discussed spiritual knowledge. In the first meeting, he did not accept the spiritual knowledge that was given by Kabir. But after he understood the spiritual knowledge from Kabir, he left idols' worship. After giving initiation to Dharamdas, Kabir Saheb took him to the Satlok (Immortal place). After coming from satlok, he wrote Kabir Sagar, Kabir Beejak, and Kabir Sakhi which were narrated by Kabir.

==== Evidence in his speech ====
Aaj mohe darshan diyo ji Kabir ||tek||

Satyalok se chal kar aaye, kaatan jam ki janjeer ||1||

Thaare darshan se mhaare paap katat hain, nirmal hovae ji shareer ||2||

Amrit bhojan mhaare Satguru jeemaen, shabd doodh ki kheer ||3||

Hindu ke tum Dev kahaaye, Musalmaan ke peer ||4||

Dono deen ka jhagda chhid gayaa, tohe na paaye shareer ||5||

Dharmdas ki arj Gosaain, beda lagaaio parle teer ||6||

=== Missionary work ===
After the founding of Kabir Chaura by Kabir's disciple Surat Gopal, whom was the first Kabirpanthi missionary, Dharamdas would slightly later found the Dham Khera (Damakheda) maṭh (also known as māī meaning "mother) located in modern-day Chhattisgarh. It conducted missionary activities in central India and had branches located in Raipur, Bilaspur, and Chindawara.

== Works ==
Within the Kabir Panth tradition, Dharamdas is regarded as one of the principal preservers and transmitters of Kabir's teachings. Several later Kabir Panth traditions attribute to him the compilation or preservation of works such as the Kabir Sagar, Anurag Sagar, and collections of Vani and Sakhi. Modern scholarship, however, considers the textual history of these works to be complex, with multiple recensions and uncertain authorship.

Dharamdas composed in Bhojpuri, a language of Eastern India, as well as in early Hindi dialects associated with central India. His poetry employs simple language, dialogue, and devotional imagery characteristic of the Nirguna Bhakti tradition. His verses emphasize the Satguru, the impermanence of worldly existence, and liberation through divine knowledge.

== Legacy ==
The Dharamdasi sub-tradition is headquartered at the Dharamdas' ashram located in Damkhera village near Raipur. The group bears similarities to the Radhasoamis. A recent spiritual master of the group was Grindhmuni Nam.

== See also ==
- Kabirpanth
- Kabir
- Kabir Dharm Nagar Damakheda
- Sachkhand
