= Kabir Dharm Nagar Damakheda =

Kabir Panth religious centre in Chhattisgarh, India

- कबीर धर्म नगर दामाखेड़ा
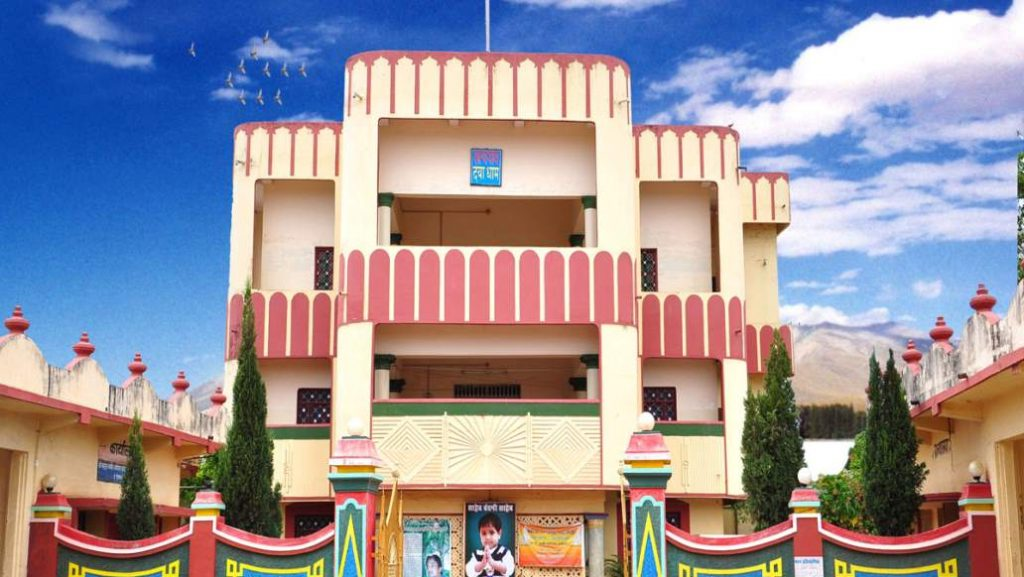
- Kabir Panth religious centre in Chhattisgarh

Religion
- Affiliation: Kabir Panth
- Festival: Magh Purnima Sant Samagam
- Ecclesiastical or organisational status: Active
- Status: Pilgrimage centre

Location
- Location: Damakheda, Baloda Bazar-Bhatapara district, Chhattisgarh, India
- Country: India

Architecture
- Type: Ashram

Website
- kabirdharmdasvanshavali.org

Kabir Dharm Nagar Damakheda is a Kabir Panth religious centre located in the Baloda Bazar-Bhatapara district of Chhattisgarh, India. It is associated with the Dharamdasi tradition of Kabir Panth and is regarded as an important pilgrimage site for followers of the sect in central India.

In February 2026, the Government of Chhattisgarh officially renamed Damakheda as "Kabir Dharm Nagar, Damakheda".

== History ==
Kabir Dharm Nagar Damakheda is linked with the Dharamdasi branch of Kabir Panth, which traces its origins to Dhani Dharamdas, traditionally regarded as one of the principal disciples of Kabir.

According to the Baloda Bazar district administration, the Kabir Panth Ashram at Damakheda was established by Guru Agardas, who is associated with the later development of the Dharamdasi tradition in the region.

== Religious importance ==
Damakheda is known for large religious congregations attended by Kabir Panth followers from different states of India. Annual events organised at the site include saint gatherings, devotional programs and community activities related to the Kabir Panth tradition.

In 2024, Chhattisgarh Chief Minister Vishnu Deo Sai announced that Damakheda would be officially referred to as "Kabir Dharm Nagar Damakheda".

== See also ==
- Kabir
- Kabir Panth
- Dharamdas
