= Michael N. Nagler =

American academic and activist

Michael N. Nagler (born January 20, 1937) is an American academic, nonviolence educator, mentor, meditator, and peace activist.

== Life ==
Nagler is professor emeritus of Classics and Comparative Literature at UC Berkeley, where he founded the Peace and Conflict Studies Program and taught upper-division courses on nonviolence, meditation and a seminar on the meaning of life. Nagler also participated in the Free Speech Movement. He is President of the Metta Center for Nonviolence and author of The Search for a Nonviolent Future, The Nonviolence Handbook, and The Third Harmony: Nonviolence and the New Story of Human Nature (March, 2020), and co-host of Nonviolence Radio and The Nonviolence Report. In 2007 Michael received the Jamnalal Bajaj international award for Promoting Gandhian Values Outside India. He has spoken for the UN, the US Institute of Peace, and many academic and public venues for over thirty years. He has lived at the Blue Mountain Center of Meditation's ashram in Northern California since 1970.

== Awards ==
- Lifetime Achievement Award, Sonoma County Peace & Justice Center (January, 2015)
- Jamnalal Bajaj International Award for Promoting Gandhian Values Outside India (2007)
- Special Recognition Award, Season for Nonviolence (April, 2006)
- Fourth Annual Hsuan Hua Memorial Lecture (Berkeley, 2004)
- Outstanding Contribution to Peace Education (Peace & Justice Studies Assoc., 2003)
- American Book Award (2002) (nominated for Grawemeyer Award, 2004)
- Christian Science Monitor essay contest winner (see bibliography)
- American Council of Learned Societies Research Grant
- National Endowment for the Humanities Summer Stipend
- MacArthur Foundation Research and Writing Program
- MacArthur Foundation research fellowship
- Distinguished Lecturer, University of Presque Isle, ME
- Chico State University Annual Peace Lectureship
- Honorary award, Maharishi International University (1975)
- Loeb Classical Lecture (Harvard University, 1973)

== Books ==
- Nagler, M. N. (1966). Formula and motif in the Homeric epics: prolegomena to an aesthetics of oral poetry. Thesis (Ph. D. in Comparative Literature)--University of California, Jan. 1966. WorldCat citation
- Michael N. Nagler (1974). Spontaneity and Tradition, A Study in the Oral Art of Homer. University of California Press. ISBN 978-0-520-02245-4.
- Michael N. Nagler (2001). the search for a nonviolent future. Berkeley Hills Books. ISBN 978-1-893163-16-4.
- The Upanishads. Translated by Eknath Easwaran. Afterword Michael N. Nagler. Nilgiri Press. 2007. ISBN 978-1-58638-021-2.
- The Third Harmony: Nonviolence and Human Destiny in the 21st Century (available for publication)
- The Nonviolence Handbook: a Guide for Practical Action. San Francisco: Berrett-Koehler Publishers 2014 (Translations: Italian, Arabic, Chinese, Korean)
- Hope or Terror: Gandhi and the Other 9/11 (Berkeley and Minneapolis: Metta and Nonviolent Peaceforce) 2006
- Our Spiritual Crisis: Recovering Human Wisdom in a Time of Violence. Chicago: Open Court 2005
- The Search for a Nonviolent Future: a Promise of Peace for Ourselves, Our Families, and Our World. Makawao, Maui, HI: Inner Ocean Publishing (2004). Original edition: Berkeley, CA: Berkeley Hills Books, 2001 (Winner of American Book Award, 2002; translated into Italian, Croatian, Korean, and several other languages)
- The Steps of Nonviolence. Nyack, NY: Fellowship of Reconciliation, 1999
- The Upanishads (with Eknath Easwaran). Petaluma, CA: Nilgiri Press 1987
- America Without Violence: Why Violence Persists and How You Can Stop It. Island Press, Covelo CA (1982).

Articles and Chapters (Peace Studies):

- “Unlocking a Nonviolent Future,” Matter of Spirit No. 105 (Winter 2015) 1-3.
- “Roadmap:a Movement of Movements,” in Kosmos Journal (electronic) for Fall, Winter 2014. http://www.kosmosjournal.org/article/roadmap-a-movement-of-movements/
- “Gandhi and Global Warming,” in Tara Sethia and Anjana Narayan, Edd., The Living Gandhi: Lessons for our Times (New Delhi: Penguin Books, 2013) 228-240.
- “Gandhi Then and Now,” in Martin Keogh, Ed., Hope Beneath Our Feet: Restoring our Place in the Natural World. (Berkeley, CA: North Atlantic Books, 2010) 62-72.
- “Connecting the Dots — Nonviolently,” in Rachel Macnair and Stephen Zunes, Edd., Consistently Opposing Killing (Westport, CN: Praeger, 2008) pp. 173–178
- “The Road to Nonviolent Coexistence in Palestine/Israel,” (with Tal Palter and Matthew Taylor), in Nonviolent Coexistence, Edd. Kumar Rupesinghe and Gayathri Fernando (Colombo, Sri Lanka: Foundation for Co-Existence) 2007, pp. 275–305
- “The Constructive Programme,” in Richard L. Johnson, Ed., Gandhi’s Experiments with Truth: Essential Writings by and about Mahatma Gandhi (New York: Rowman & Littlefield) 2006, 253-259
- “Spirit Rising,” Yes! A Journal of Positive Futures, (Winter, 2006) 12-17
- “Spinning Wheel Birthday,” The Acorn xii:2 (Spring-Summer, 2004) 36-38. Reprinted as “What would the world be like if we followed Gandhi?”, in The Santa Rosa Press Democrat, Nov. 27, 2004; German translation: in Telepolis, http://www.heise.de/tp/r4/html/result.xhtml?url=/tp/r4/artikel/17/17837/1.html&words=Nagler
- “The Time for Nonviolence Has Come,” Yes! (Summer, 2003); German translation: “Es ist Zeit für die Gewaltfreiheit,” http://www.telepolis.de/deutsch/inhalt/co/18642/1.html (With Marcel Baumann)
- “Building a New Force,” Yes! (Fall, 2002: reprinted in McConnell and van Gelder, Making Peace: Healing a Violent World (Bainbridge Island, WA: Positive Futures Network), 2003
- “Compassion: the Radicalism of This Age,” Yes! (Fall, 1998: reprinted in McConnell and van Gelder, op. cit.)
- “The Challenge of Nonviolence,” afterword to Catherine Ingram, In the Footsteps of Gandhi (Berkeley: Parallax Press, 2003) 255-258 (listed in Working Assets December, 2005 Recommended Reading program)
- “Out of Darkness, a Strange Hope,” Tikkun, January/February, 2002, 23-26
- “The Logic of Nonviolence,” Fellowship 65:7-8 (July–August, 1999) 10
- “What is Peace Culture,” in Ho-Won Jeong, Ed., A New Agenda for Peace Research (Aldershot: Ashgate Publishing, 1999) 233-258
- “Unity in Diversity: From Paradox to Paradigm,” Ahimsa Voices 4:1 (1997) 1-2
- “Is There a Tradition of Nonviolence in Islam?,” in J. Patout Burns, Ed., War and its Discontents: Pacifism and Quietism in the Abrahamic Traditions (Washington, D. C., Georgetown University Press, 1996) 161-166
- “Forget the Past,” Fellowship 60:7/8 (July/August, 1994) 13
- Meditation for Peacemakers Metta Publication (1994)
- Peacemaking Through Nonviolence Metta (1994: testimony for U.S. Commission on the Effectiveness of the U. N.; excerpted in World Without Violence, Ed. Arun Gandhi, New Delhi, 1994: 189-199).
- “Ideas of World Order and the Map of Peace,” in Thompson et al., Edd., Approaches to Peace: An Intellectual Map (Washington, D.C.: U.S. Institute of Peace, 1991) 371-392
- “Nonviolence,” in Lazlo and Yoo, Edd., World Encyclopedia of Peace,” (Oxford: Pergamon, 1986) Vol. I. 72-78
- “Comment” on R. J. Rummel, “Social Field Theory, Libertarianism, and Violence,” International Journal on World Peace 3:4 (1986) 44-46 (with Barry Zellen)
- “Redefining Peace,” Bulletin of the Atomic Scientists (1984) 36-38. Reprinted: Donna U. Gregory, Ed., The Nuclear Predicament (New York: St. Martin's, 1986) 330-334; Don Carlson and Craig Comstock, Edd., Citizen Summitry (New York: St. Martin's, 1986) 238-245
- “Education as a Five-Letter Word.” Teachers College Record, 84:1 (1982), 102-114. Reprinted in Douglas Sloan, Ed., Education for Peace and Disarmament (New York: Columbia Teachers College Press, 1983)
- “Peace as a Paradigm Shift,” Bulletin of the Atomic Scientists. (December, 1981). Translations: “Friede als Paradigmenwechsel,” in Rüdiger Lutz, Ed., Bewusstseins (R)evolution (Weinheim: Beltz, 1983); “La Pace come cambiamento di paradigma,” University of Naples history of physics brochure, 1983
- “Berkeley: the Demonstrations,” Studies on the Left 5:1 (1965) 55-62.

Articles (Classics and Comparative Literature):

- “Penelope’s Male Hand: Gender and Violence in the Odyssey,” Colby Quarterly 29:3 (1993) 241-257
- “Discourse and Conflict in Hesiod: Eris and the Erides,” Ramus 21:1(1992) 79-96
- “Odysseus: The Proem and the Problem,” Classical Antiquity 9:2 (1990) 158-178
- “Ethical Anxiety and Artistic Inconsistency: The Case of Oral Epic,” in M. Griffith and D. J. Mastronarde, Cabinet of the Muses (Atlanta: Scholars Press, 1990) 225-239
- “The Traditional Phrase: Theory of Production,” in John Miles Foley, Ed., Oral Formulaic Theory: a Folklore Casebook (New York: Garland, 1990) 283-312
- “Toward a Semantics of Ancient Conflict: Eris in the Iliad,” Classical World 82:2 (1988) 81-90
- “Priams Kiss: Toward a Peace Concept in Western Culture,” in Ulrich Goebel and Otto M. Nelson, Eds., War and Peace: Perspectives in the Nuclear Age (Lubbock: Texas Tech University Press, 1988) 125-136
- “On Almost Killing Your Friends: Aspects of Violence in Early Epic and Ritual,” in John Miles Foley, Ed. Current Issues in Oral Literature Research: a Memorial for Milman Parry (Columbus, OH: Slavica, 1987) 395-433
- “Homeric Epic and the Social Order,” in K. Myrsiades, Ed., Approaches to Teaching Homer's Iliad and Odyssey (New York: Modern Language Association, 1987) 57-62
- “Foreign Languages and World Community,” Foreign Language Newsletter 34:125 (1984) 3
- “Beowulf in the Context of Myth,” J. Niles, Ed. in Old English Literature in Context (Cambridge, England, 1980) 143-156
- “Entretiens avec Tirésias,” Classical World 74 (1980) 89-108
- “Dread Goddess Endowed with Speech: A Study of Womankind in the Odyssey,” Archaeological News VI: (1977) 77-83
- “Towards a Generative View of the Oral Formula,” TAPhA 98 (1967) 269-311
- “Oral Poetry and the Question of Originality in Literature,” Actes du V^{e} Congres de l'Association Internationale de Littérature Comparée, ed. by N. Banasevic (Belgrade, 1966); German tr. in: J. Latacz (ed.), Homer - Tradition und Neuerung (Darmstadt, 1977)
- “Dread Goddess Revisited,” in Seth L. Schein, Ed., Reading the Odyssey: Selected Interpretive Essays (Princeton University Press: revision of “Dread Goddess Endowed with Speech,” above).

Anthologies

- Vinson Brown, ed. (1983). "Peace as a Paradigm Shift". Prevent doomsday: an anti nuclear anthology : imperative essays on the nuclear nightmare vs. world peace. Branden Books. ISBN 978-0-8283-1875-4.
- Seth L. Schein, ed. (1996). "Dread Goddess Revisited". Reading the Odyssey: selected interpretive essays. Princeton University Press. ISBN 978-0-691-04439-2.
- Senthil Ram; Ralph Summy, eds. (2007). "The Mahatma and the Mudjihadeen: Gandhi's Answer to Terrorism". Nonviolence: An Alternative for Defeating Global Terror(ism). Nova Publishers. ISBN 978-1-60021-812-5.
