= Shabnam Virmani =

Indian film director

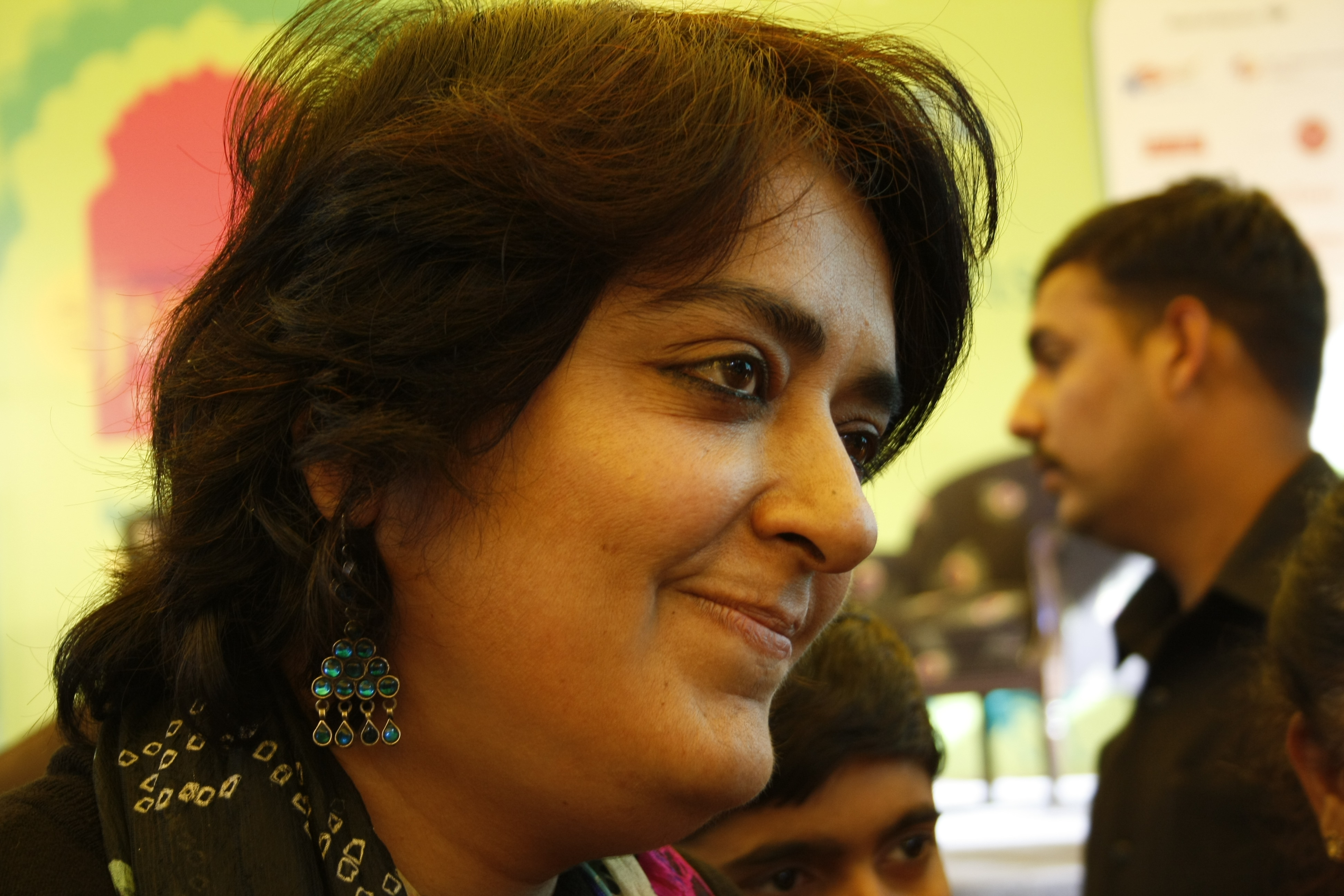
- Education: Times Research Foundation School for Journalism, New Delhi; Cornell University, USA
- Alma mater: Times Research Foundation School for Journalism, Cornell University, US
- Occupation: Documentary film maker
- Known for: Co-founder of the Drishti Media Collective; Artist-in-Residence at the Srishti School of Art, Design & Technology, Bangalore; Director – Kabir Project; Documentary Films; Journalism

Shabnam Virmani is a documentary film maker. She has also been an artist-in-residence at the Srishti School of Art, Design and Technology in Bangalore since 2002. A co-founder of the Drishti Media Arts and Human Rights Collective, Virmani has directed several documentaries, some of which have won awards. She's also a composer and festivities participant.

Kabira Khada Bazaar Mein, a documentary film by Virmani on the poet-saint part, won the Special Jury Prize at the 58th National Awards in June 2011.

The award was granted in acknowledgement of the film's power to expose the nuances of, and remedial suggestions to, the Kabir community.

== Awards and nominations ==
=== Had-Anhad (Bounded-Boundless) ===
Journeys with Ram and Kabir

- 1st Prize (shared), One Billion Eyes Documentary Film Festival, August 2009, Chennai
- Mahindra Indo-American Arts Council Film Festival, 5–9 November, New York City
- World Performing Arts Festival, Nov 2008, Lahore, Pakistan
- Bangalore International Film Festival, Jan 2009, Bangalore, India
- Kala Ghoda Festival, Feb 2009, Mumbai
- Inaugural film, VIBGYOR International Film Festival, Feb 2009, Thrissur, Kerala, India

=== Chalo Hamara Des (Come to My Country) ===
Journeys with Kabir and Friends

- One Billion Eyes Documentary Film Festival, August 2008, Chennai, India
- World Performing Arts Festival, Nov 2008, Lahore, Pakistan
- International Festival of Sacred Arts, Feb 2009 Delhi, India
- VIBGYOR International Film Festival, Feb 2009, Thrissur, Kerala, India

=== Koi Sunta Hai (Someone Listens) ===
Journeys with Kumar and Kabir

- One Billion Eyes Documentary Film Festival, August 2008, Chennai, India
- World Performing Arts Festival, Nov 2008, Lahore, Pakistan
- VIBGYOR International Film Festival, Feb 2009, Thrissur, Kerala, India

=== Kabira Khada Bazaar Mein (In the Market Stands Kabir) ===
Journeys with Kabir and Friends

- Special Jury Prize at the 58th National Awards, India, June 2011.

=== When Women Unite:The Story of an Uprising/Aadavallu Ekamaite ===
- Grand Prize, 6th Tokyo Global Environmental Film Festival, 1997.
- Chingari Video Festival, Conference on South Asian Studies, University of Wisconsin, Madison, USA, 1996
- Margaret Mead International Film Festival, New York City, 1997
- Margaret Mead Travelling Film and Video Festival, 1997–98
- Film South Asia, Kathmandu, Nepal, 1997
- 5th Mumbai International Film Festival, 1998
- Sakshi Film Festival, Bangalore, 1998
- Prakriti Film Festival, Pune, 1999
- New Delhi Video Festival, 1999

=== Tu Zinda Hai!/You Are Alive! ===
- Awarded Best Film in the Society & Development Category, International Video Festival (IVFEST), Thiruvananthapuram, 1995
- Yamagata International Documentary Film Festival, Japan, 1997
- Chingari Video Festival, Conference of South Asian Studies, University of Wisconsin, Madison, USA, 1997
- Film South Asia, Kathmandu, Nepal, 1997
- Prakriti Film Festival, Hyderabad, 1997
- Fribourg International Film Festival, Switzerland, 1998

=== Umati Umang ni Damri/Hopes Soaring High ===
- Mumbai International Film Festival, Video Vista, 1996
- Margaret Mead International Film Festival, New York, 1996
- Margaret Mead Travelling Film Festival, USA, 1996–97

=== Kunjal Paanje Kutch Ji (Sarus Crane of our Kutch) ===
Radio production

- Chameli Devi Jain Award for Women in Journalism, March 2001
