= Kshitimohan Sen =

Indian scholar

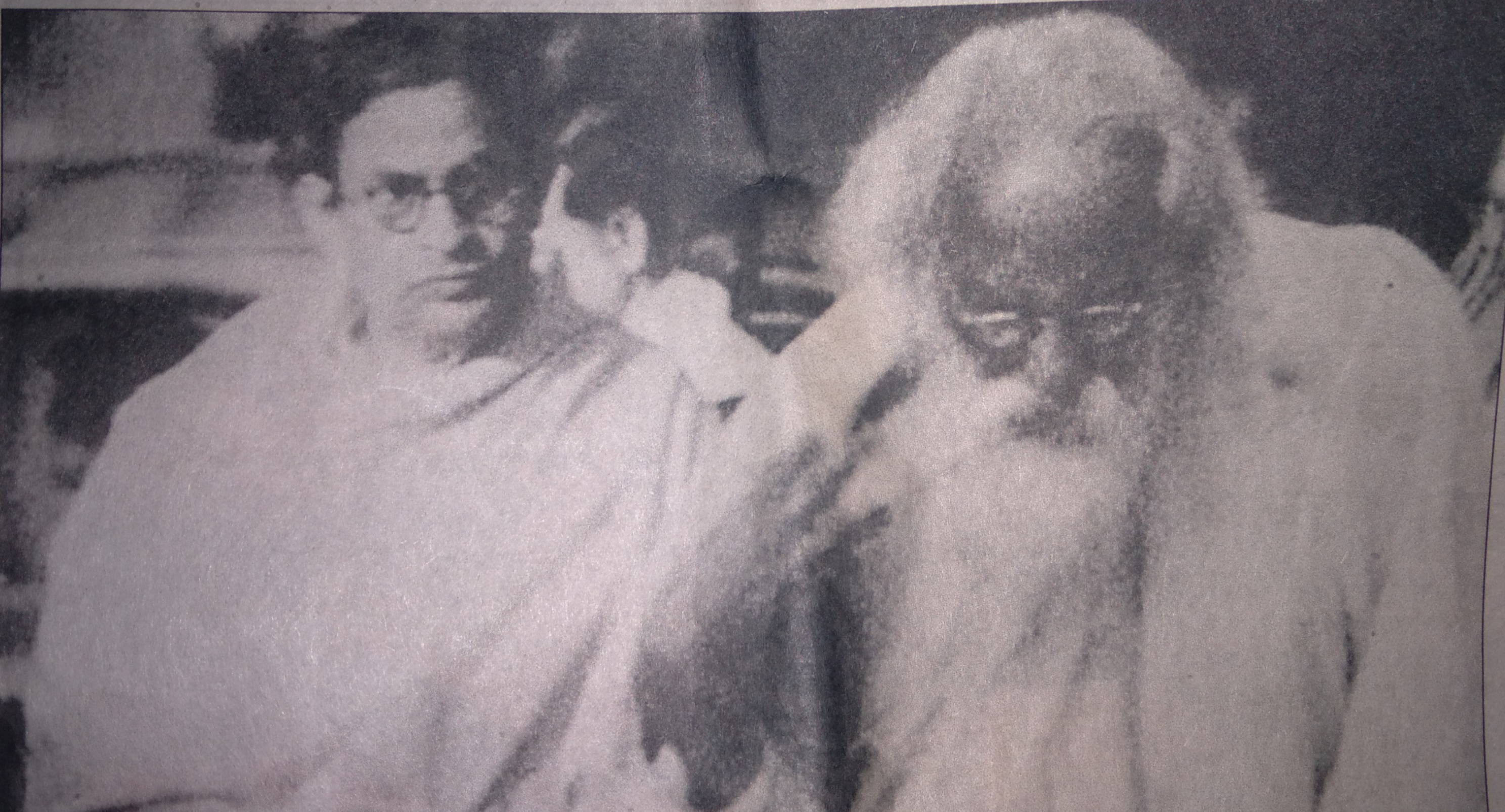
- Kshitimohan Sen with Rabindranath Tagore
- Born: 30 November 1880; Dhaka Bikrampur Now Munshiganj East Bengal (now Bangladesh), British India
- Died: 12 March 1960 (aged 79); Shantiniketan, West Bengal, India
- Occupations: Professor, writer

Kshitimohan Sen (2 December 1880 – 12 March 1960) was an Indian scholar, writer, a Sanskrit professor and an M.A. in Sanskrit from Queen's College, Benares. He was born in a Baidya family hailing from Sonarang in Bengal Presidency (now in Bangladesh). He started his working life at the Department of Education, Chamba State. In 1908, at the call of Rabindranath Tagore, he joined Brahmacharyashram. Later he performed responsibility of Adhyaksha of Vidyabhaban. He was the first Deshikottam (1952) of Vishwa Bharati. He was an acting Upacharyas of Visva-Bharati University (1953–1954). He is the maternal grandfather of Amartya Sen.

Amartya Sen has written at length about Kshitimohan Sen and the latter's relation with Rabindranath Tagore in his memoir Home in the World.

== Books ==
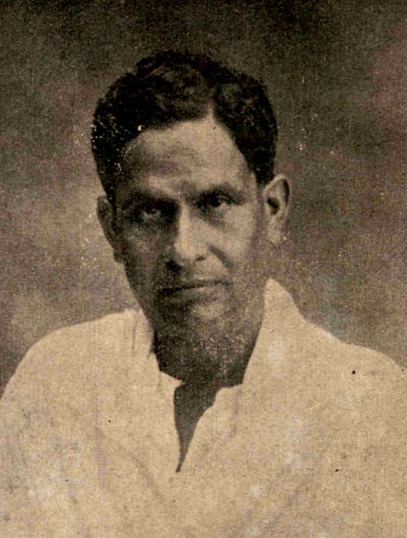

- Kabir (1910–11)
- Bharatiya Madhyayuger Sadhanar Dhara (1930)
- Dadu (1935)
- Bharater Sangskrti (1943)
- Banglar Sadhana (1945)
- Yuga Guru Rammohan (1945)
- Jatibhed (1946)
- Banglar Baul (1947)
- Hindu Sangskrtir Svarup (1947)
- Bharater Hindu-Mussalman Yukta Sadhana (1949)
- Prachin Bharate Nari (1950)
- Chinmay Banga (1957)
- Hinduism (1961)
- Sadhak O Sadhana (2003)
