= Sceptre =

Staff held by a ruler to symbolize authority

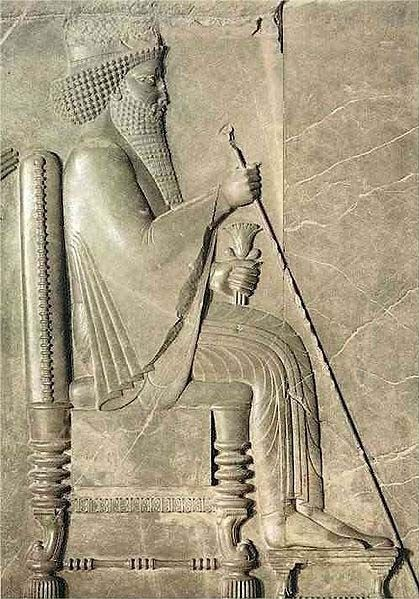
Relief carving of Darius the Great of Persia on his throne, holding a sceptre and lotus

A sceptre (spelled scepter in American English) is a staff or wand held in the hand by a ruling monarch as an item of royal or imperial insignia, signifying sovereign authority.

== Antiquity ==
=== Ancient Egypt, Mesopotamia and Judea ===
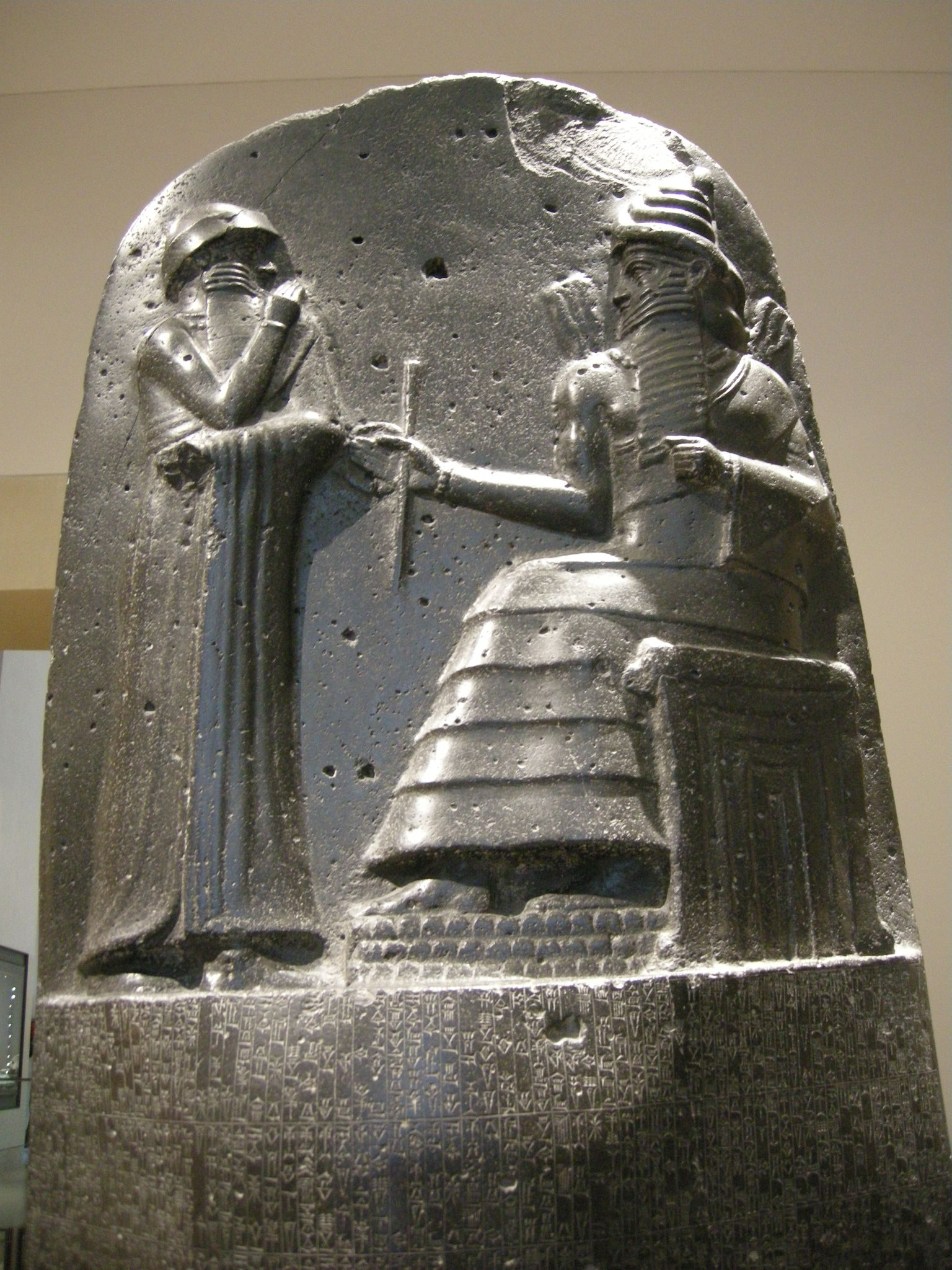
The Code of Hammurabi stela depicts the god Shamash holding a staff.

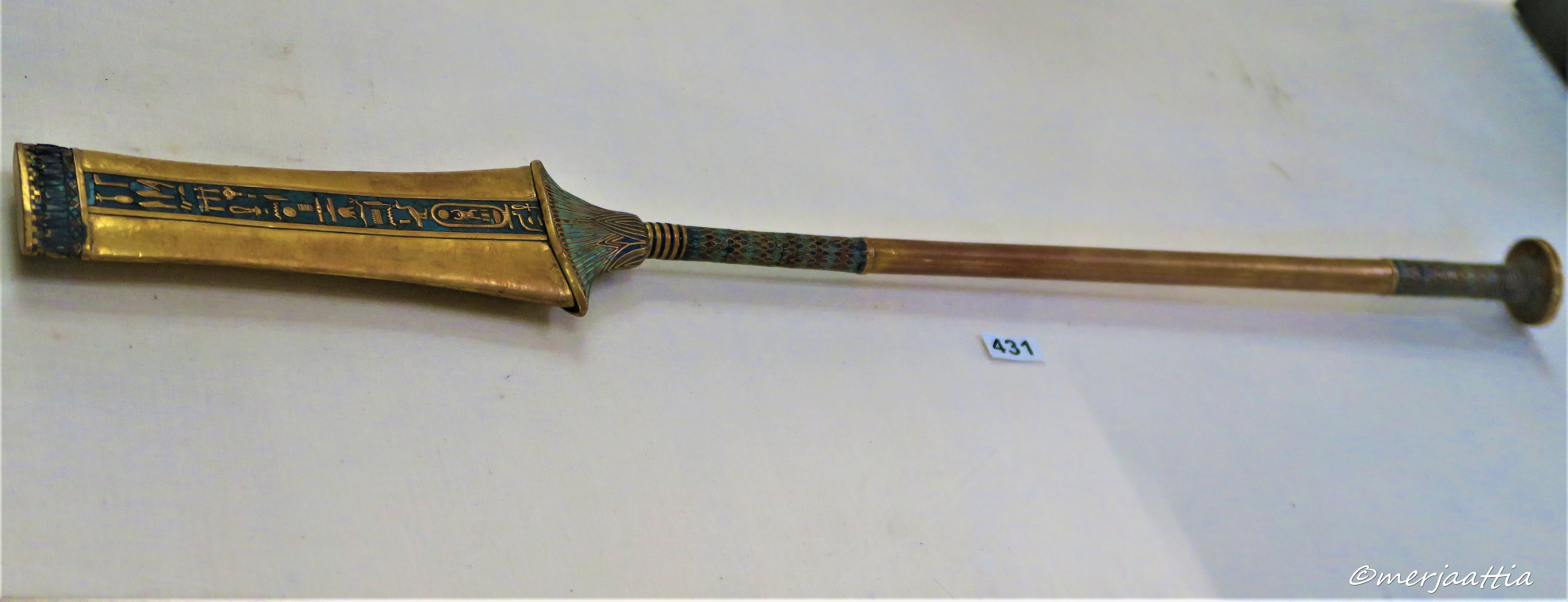
The Gilded Wooden sceptre of Tutankhamun.

The Was and other types of staves were signs of authority in Ancient Egypt. For this reason they are often described as "sceptres", even if they are full-length staffs. One of the earliest royal sceptres was discovered in the 2nd Dynasty tomb of Khasekhemwy in Abydos. Kings were also known to carry a staff, and Pharaoh Anedjib is shown on stone vessels carrying a so-called mks-staff. The staff with the longest history seems to be the heqa-sceptre (the "shepherd's crook").

The sceptre also assumed a central role in the Mesopotamian world, and was in most cases part of the royal insignia of sovereigns and gods. This continued throughout Mesopotamian history, as illustrated in literary and administrative texts and iconography. The Mesopotamian sceptre was mostly called ĝidru in Sumerian and ḫaṭṭum in Akkadian.

The Biblical Book of Genesis refers to the sceptre of Judah.

"The sceptre shall not depart from Judah, nor a lawgiver from between his feet, until Shiloh come; and unto him shall the gathering of the people be."

— Genesis 49:10 KJV

In the First Persian Empire, the Biblical Book of Esther mentions the sceptre of the King of Persia.

"When the king saw Esther the queen standing in the court, she obtained favor in his sight; and the king held out to Esther the golden scepter that was in his hand. So Esther came near, and touched the top of the scepter."

— Esther 5:2

=== Greco-Roman world ===
Among the early Greeks, the sceptre (Ancient Greek: σκῆπτρον, skeptron, "staff, stick, baton") was a long staff, such as Achilles wielded (Iliad, i) or was used by respected elders (Iliad, xviii. 46; Herodotus 1. 196), and came to be used by judges, military leaders, priests, and others in authority. It is represented on painted vases as a long staff tipped with a metal ornament. When the sceptre is borne by Zeus or Hades, it is headed by a bird. It was this symbol of Zeus, the king of the gods and ruler of Olympus, that gave their inviolable status to the kerykes, the heralds, who were thus protected by the precursor of modern diplomatic immunity. When, in the Iliad, Agamemnon sends Odysseus to parley with the leaders of the Achaeans, he lends him his sceptre.

Among the Etruscans, sceptres of great magnificence were used by kings and high priests. Many representations of such sceptres occur on the walls of the painted tombs of Etruria. The British Museum, the Vatican, and the Louvre possess Etruscan sceptres of gold, elaborately and minutely ornamented.

The Roman sceptre probably derived from the Etruscan. Under the Republic, an ivory sceptre (sceptrum eburneum) was a mark of consular rank. It was also used by victorious generals who received the title of imperator, and its use as a symbol of delegated authority to legates apparently was revived in the marshal's baton.

Under the Roman Empire, the sceptrum Augusti was specially used by the emperors, and was often of ivory tipped with a golden eagle. It is frequently shown on medallions of the later empire, which have on the obverse a half-length figure of the emperor, holding in one hand the sceptrum Augusti, and in the other the orb surmounted by a small figure of Victory.

=== India ===
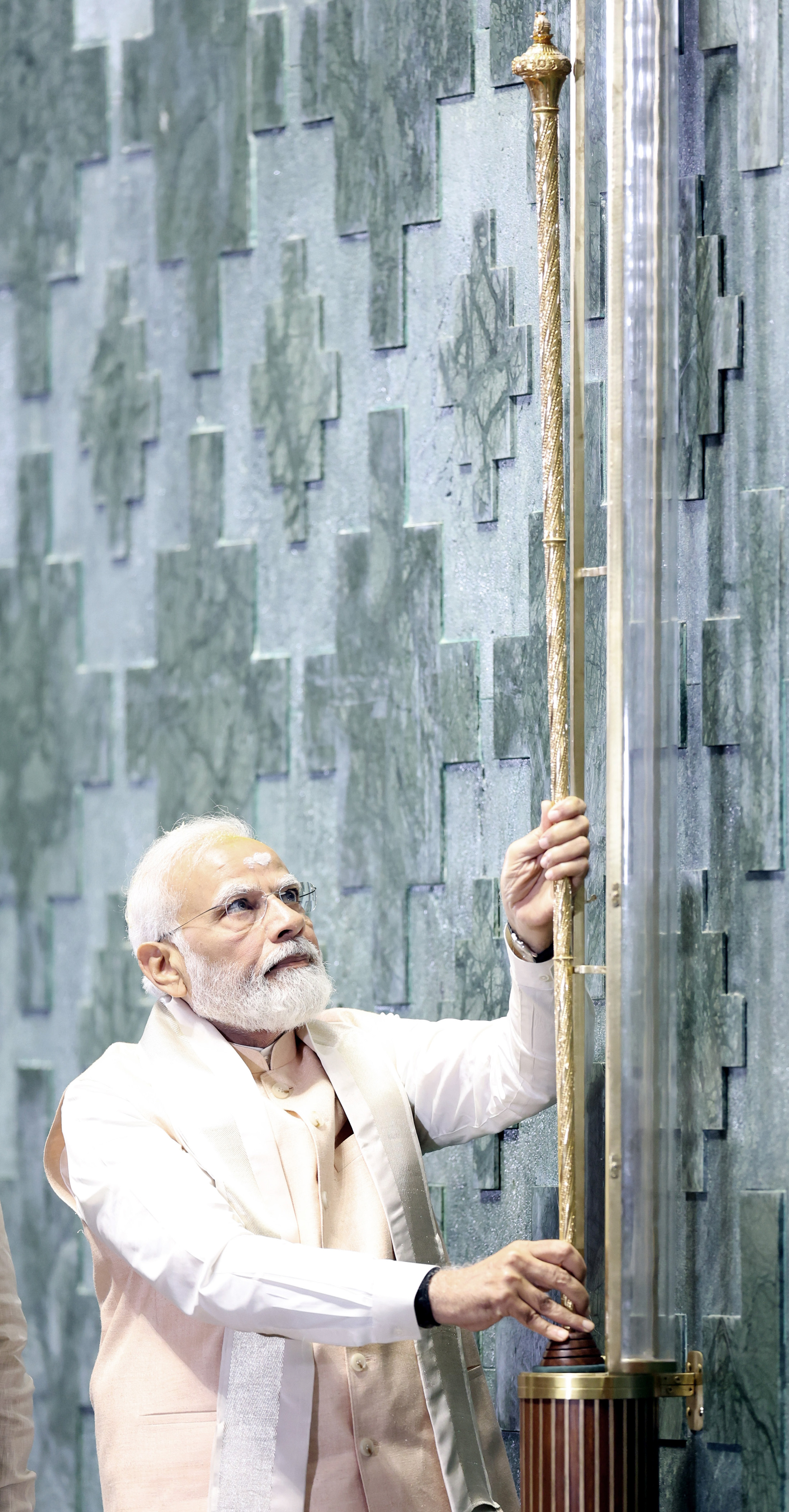
Indian prime minister Narendra Modi installing the Sengol sceptre in the new Indian Parliament

The codes of the just and the cruel sceptre are found in the ancient Tamil work of Tirukkural, dated before 5th century CE. In its chapters 55 (Sengol) and 56 (Kondungol), the text deals with the just and the cruel sceptre, respectively, furthering the thought on the ethical behaviour of the ruler discussed in many of the preceding and the following chapters. The ancient treatise says it was not the king's spear but the just sceptre, known as "Sengol" in Tamil, that bound him to his people—and to the extent that he guarded them, his own good rule would guard him. It was a practice of ancient Indian kingdoms and dynasties, such as the Chola kings, to use a symbolic sceptre during coronations.

One such sceptre, the Sengol, was presented to Jawaharlal Nehru on 14 August 1947 by the Thiruvaduthurai Adheenam symbolising the transfer of power as followed by Ancient Hindu kings. It was displayed in the Allahabad Museum under the then Indian government wrongly marked as 'Golden walking Stick Gifted to Pt Jawahar Lal Nehru'. In 2023, the government of India decided to install this gold-plated sceptre in the newly inaugurated Indian Parliament. The presentation of the Sengol sceptre to the first Indian Prime Minister in 1947 was claimed as a 'symbol of transfer of power from British to India', which has stirred up debates among few historians, who point to the lack of sources that portray the event as an official event.

== Christendom ==
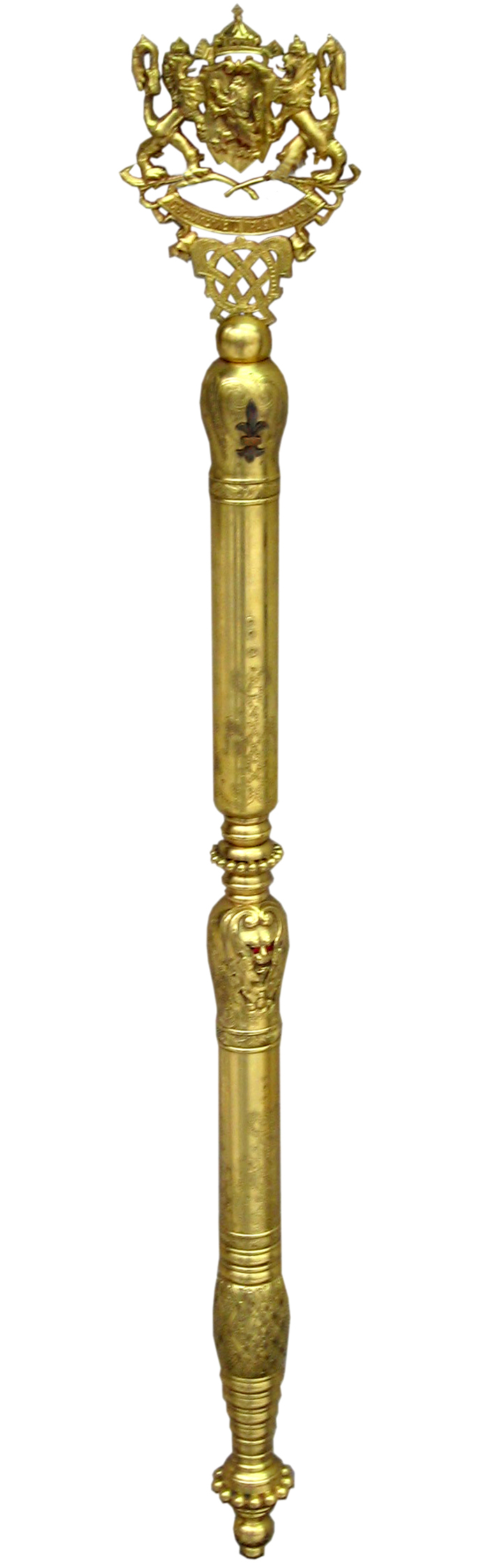
The Royal Sceptre of Boris III of Bulgaria

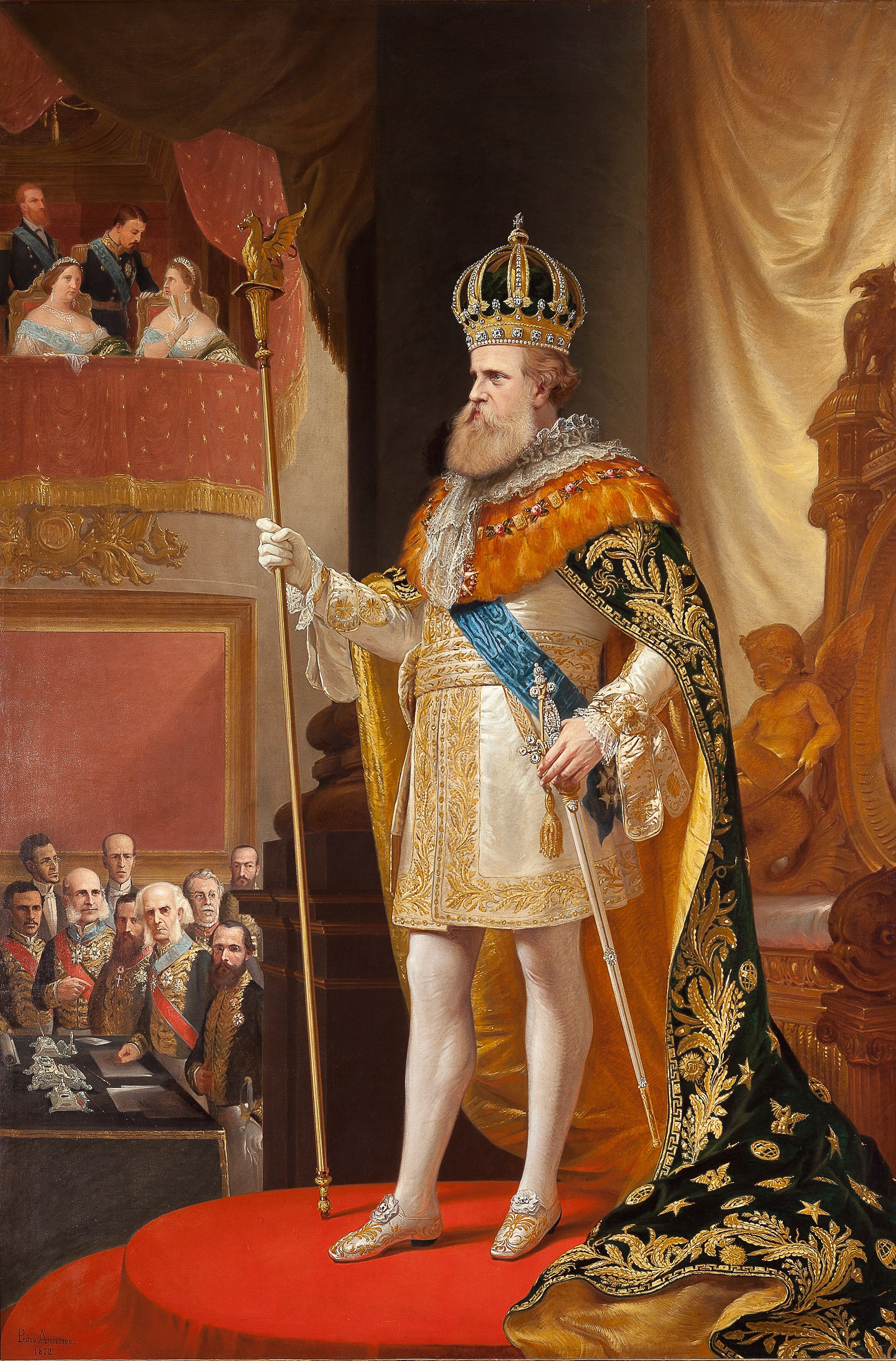
An 1872 portrait of Emperor Pedro II of Brazil, holding the very large Imperial Sceptre and invested with other items of the Brazilian Crown Jewels

With the advent of Christianity, the sceptre was often tipped with a cross instead of with an eagle. However, during the Middle Ages, the finials on the top of the sceptre varied considerably.

In England, from a very early period, two sceptres have been concurrently used, and from the time of Richard I, they have been distinguished as being tipped with a cross and a dove respectively. In France, the royal sceptre was tipped with a fleur de lys, and the other, known as the main de justice, had an open hand of benediction on the top.

Sceptres with small shrines on the top are sometimes represented on royal seals, as on the great seal of Edward III, where the king, enthroned, bears such a sceptre, but it was an unusual form; and one of the sceptres of Scotland, preserved at Edinburgh, has such a shrine at the top, with little images of the Virgin Mary, Saint Andrew, and Saint James the Great in it. This sceptre was, it is believed, made in France around 1536 for James V. Great seals usually represent the sovereign enthroned, holding a sceptre (often the second in dignity) in the right hand, and the orb and cross in the left. Harold Godwinson appears thus in the Bayeux Tapestry.

The earliest English coronation form of the 9th century mentions a sceptre (sceptrum), and a staff (baculum). In the so-called coronation form of Æthelred the Unready, a sceptre (sceptrum), and a rod (virga) appear, as they do also in the case of a coronation order of the 12th century. In a contemporary account of Richard I's coronation, the royal sceptre of gold with a gold cross (sceptrum), and the gold rod with a gold dove on the top (virga), enter the historical record for the first time. About 1450, Sporley, a monk of Westminster, compiled a list of the relics there. These included the articles used at the coronation of Saint Edward the Confessor, and left by him for the coronations of his successors. A golden sceptre, a wooden rod gilt, and an iron rod are named. These survived until the Commonwealth, and are minutely described in an inventory of the regalia drawn up in 1649, when everything was destroyed.

For the coronation of Charles II of England, new sceptres with the Cross and the Dove were made, and though slightly altered, they are still in use today. Two sceptres for the queen consort, one with a cross, and the other with a dove, have been subsequently added.

The flags of Moldova and Montenegro have sceptres on them, clasped by eagles.

== See also ==
- Axis mundi
- Baton
- Black Rod
- Bulawa
- Pernach
- Ceremonial mace
- Crown jewels
- Fool's sceptre
- White Rod
- Hu (ritual baton)
- Margna
