= P. N. Menon =

P. N. Menon may refer to:

- P. N. Menon (diplomat), Indian diplomat
- P. N. Menon (director), Indian film director in Malayalam cinema
