= Sengol =

Golden sceptre in the Parliament of India

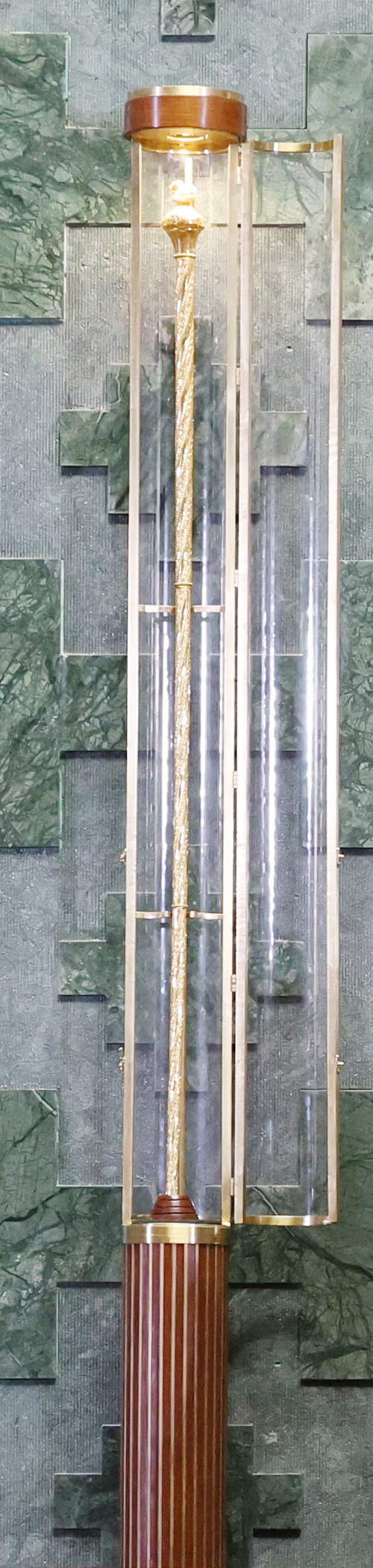
The Sengol in the Lok Sabha

The Sengol (Tamil: செங்கோல்) is a gold-plated, silver sceptre that is installed in Lower House (Lok Sabha) of the Parliament of India. The sceptre is believed to have been handed over to Prime Minister Jawaharlal Nehru, the first Prime Minister of India, by a Tanjorean Adheenam in a ceremony as a symbol of the transfer of power on the evening before the Independence of India in 1947.

The Sengol was housed at Allahabad Museum for decades until it was moved to its present location upon the new Parliament building's inauguration by Prime Minister Narendra Modi in May 2023.

== History ==
As the independence of India drew near, Jawaharlal Nehru and other members of the Indian National Congress (INC or Congress) took part in religious ceremonies and received gifts. On such an occasion on 14 August 1947, emissaries from the Thiruvaduthurai Adheenam Matha, a Shaivite monastery in the erstwhile Tanjore district of Madras Presidency (nowadays Mayiladuthurai district of Tamil Nadu), presented Nehru with the Sengol at his home. According to a report in Time:

From Tanjore in south India came two emissaries of Sri Amblavana Desigar, head of a sannyasi order of Hindu ascetics. Sri Amblavana thought that Nehru, as first Indian head of a really Indian Government ought, like ancient Hindu kings, to receive the symbol of power and authority from Hindu holy men ... One sannyasi carried a sceptre of gold, five feet long, two inches thick. He sprinkled Nehru with holy water from Tanjore and drew a streak in sacred ash across Nehru's forehead. Then he wrapped Nehru in the pithambaram and handed him the golden sceptre. He also gave Nehru some cooked rice which had been offered that very morning to the dancing god Nataraja in south India, then flown by plane to Delhi.

The event had negligible impact on public discourse at the time; contemporaneous news clips recorded the gift of the Sengol as a courtesy. Soon afterwards, the Sengol and other belongings of Nehru were donated to Allahabad Museum in Prayagraj.

Front page clipping from the Telugu newspaper Andhra Patrika dated August 17, 1947, showing a photo of the Sengol being presented to Nehru. (Translation: On the occasion of India's Independence Day, the head of the Thiruvavaduthurai Mutt, His Holiness Sri Ambalavana Pandara Sannadhi, presented a golden sceptre to Shri Jawaharlal Nehru.)

The Sengol lost prominence until it was placed in Loksabha during the inauguration of New Parliament House, New Delhi, in 2023. At the inauguration, Prime Minister Narendra Modi, who was accompanied by Shaivite pontiffs heading the 20 Adheenams in Tamil Nadu, installed the Sengol near the chair of the Speaker of the Lok Sabha.

The Sengol, believed to have been a symbol of transfer of power from the United Kingdom to the newly independent India, appears to have been derived from a year-old article by Swaminathan Gurumurthy published in Thuglak magazine; Gurumurthy attributed it to the recollections of Sri Chandrasekarendra Saraswati, the 68th head of the Kanchi Kamakoti Peetham, as told to a disciple in 1978.

According to the Government, upon being asked by Lord Mountbatten about a symbol to mark the transfer of power, Nehru discussed the issue with his fellow Congress leader C. Rajagopalachari, who informed Nehru of the Chola tradition of the transfer of the sengol and with his agreement, approached the seer of Thiruvaduthurai Adheenam Matha to make one. A delegation of monks flew to Delhi to present this sengol first to Mountbatten and then to Nehru in an official ceremony.

== Design ==
Vummidi Bangaru Chetty, a jeweller from Madras (currently Chennai), crafted the Sengol. The Sengol is a handcrafted, gold-plated sceptre about five feet (1.5 m) long, and has a diameter of about three inches (76 mm) at the top and one inch (25 mm) at the bottom. It encases a wooden staff and is surmounted by a sitting Nandi to symbolise justice and righteousness.

== Reception ==
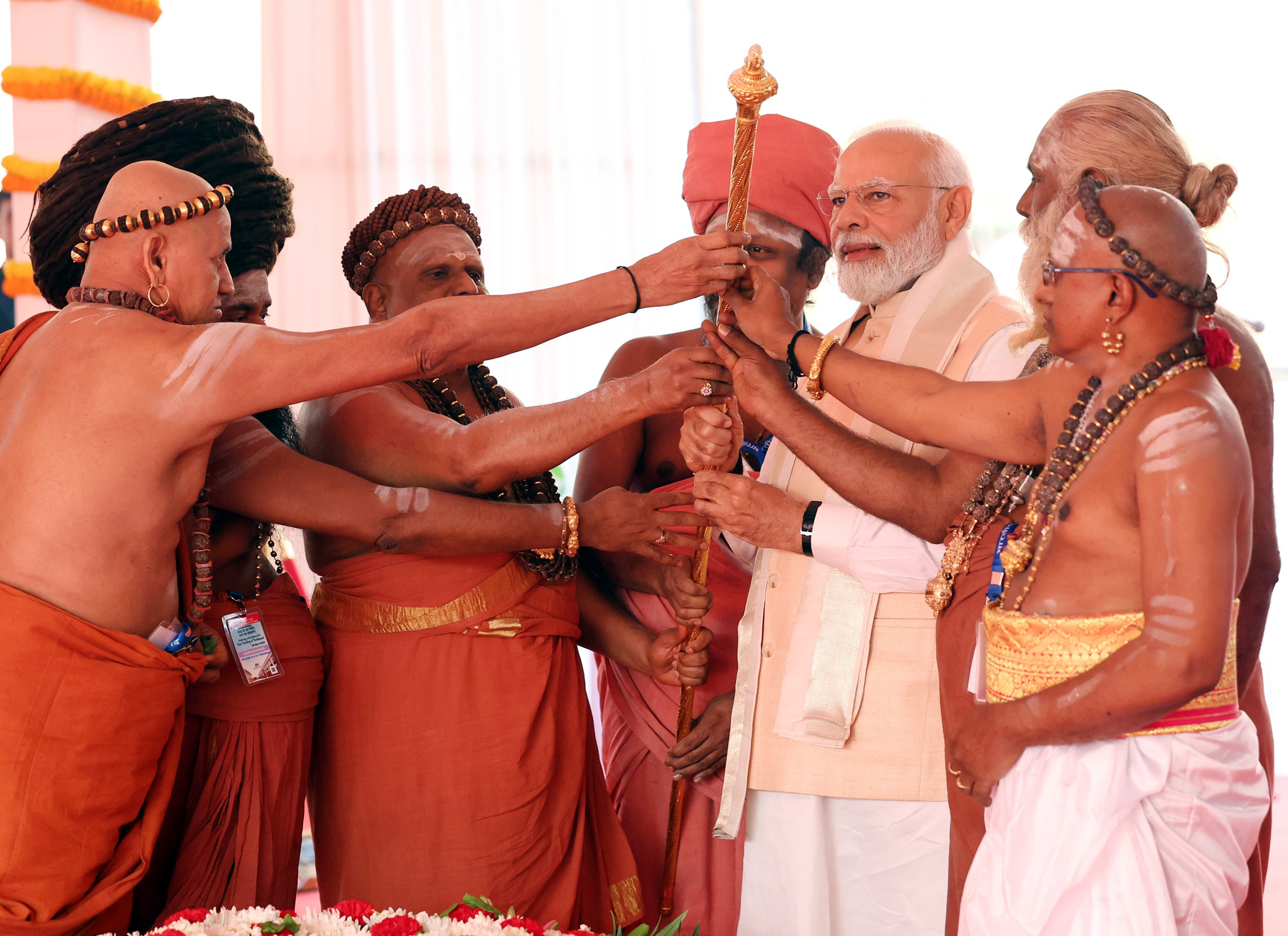
PM Modi receiving the Sengol from Adheenam pontiffs in 2023

Barely a fortnight after Nehru received the Sengol, C. N. Annadurai, a Dravidian nationalist and the future first Chief Minister of Tamil Nadu, wrote a polemical tract on the subject for Dravida Nadu, pondering the socio-political implications of his acceptance. He warned the motive of the Adheenam was to convince the public later they had inaugurated the new government.

Many political analysts have noted the increasing use of Hindu grammar in the domains of the state. In 2023, The New York Times noted that this sceptre emerged as a key object encapsulating the meaning of the new Parliament, that is, "to shed not just the remnants of India's colonial past, but also increasingly to replace the secular governance that followed it". Others found the use of a monarchical relic unsuitable for a parliamentary democracy.

== See also ==
- New Parliament House
- Ceremonial mace
