= Raveesh Kumar =

Indian Civil Servant (IFS Officer)

Raveesh Kumar IFS
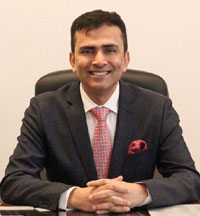

Ambassador of India to the Czech Republic
- Incumbent
- Assumed office 27 June 2024
- Prime Minister: Narendra Modi
- Preceded by: Hemant H. Kotalwar

Ambassador of India to Finland and Estonia
- In office 17 July 2020 – 26 June 2024
- Prime Minister: Narendra Modi
- Preceded by: Vani Rao
- Succeeded by: Hemant H. Kotalwar

Official Spokesperson of the Ministry of External Affairs
- In office 21 July 2017 – 6 April 2020
- Prime Minister: Narendra Modi
- Preceded by: Gopal Bagalay
- Succeeded by: Anurag Srivastava

Personal details
- Born: 26 January 1971 (age 55) Bhagalpur, Bihar, India
- Spouse: Ranjana Raveesh
- Children: 2
- Education: Mount Assisi School; Delhi Public School, Mathura Road; Hansraj College; Delhi University
- Occupation: IFS
- Profession: Diplomat

Raveesh Kumar (born 26 January 1971) is an Indian diplomat in the Indian Foreign Service of 1995 batch. He was appointed as the ambassador of India to the Czech Republic on 11 January 2024 and formally assumed charge on 27 June 2024. Previously, he served as Indian ambassador to Finland also accredited to Estonia, residing in Helsinki. He was the former official spokesperson of the Ministry of External Affairs (MEA) in the Government of India. He was the youngest ever official spokesperson. He was the consul general of India in Frankfurt, Germany, before being appointed as the spokesperson of the MEA.

== Early life and education ==
Raveesh Kumar was born in Nathnagar, Bhagalpur district of Bihar. He attended Mount Assisi School, Bhagalpur till class 10, after which he attended Delhi Public School, Mathura Road till class 12. He holds a bachelor's degree with honours in history from Hansraj College, Delhi University.

== Diplomatic career ==
Kumar joined the Indian Foreign Service in 1995, through the Union Public Service Commission (UPSC) conducted Civil Service Examination. He started his diplomatic career at the Indian mission in Jakarta, Indonesia in 1997. This was followed by posting in Thimpu, Bhutan, as second secretary/first secretary, where he looked after development assistance projects. During his stint in New Delhi from 2004 to 2007, he was the desk officer at the East Asia desk, covering Japan and Republic of Korea. He was then posted to London, United Kingdom, as political counsellor responsible for bilateral political relationships and engagements with the Parliament of the United Kingdom. Subsequently, he moved as deputy chief of mission to Jakarta from September 2010 to August 2013, followed by his posting as Consul General of India in Frankfurt, Germany, from August 2013 to July 2017. Kumar was the official spokesperson of the Ministry of External Affairs and joint secretary (external publicity) from July 2017 till April 2020.

On 11 January 2024, Kumar was appointed as the next ambassador of India to Czech Republic. On, 27 June 2024 he took charge as Indian ambassador to the Czech Republic.

== See also ==
- Navtej Sarna
- Taranjit Singh Sandhu
- Harsh Vardhan Shringla
