= Vidyasankar Sthapathy =

Indian sculptor

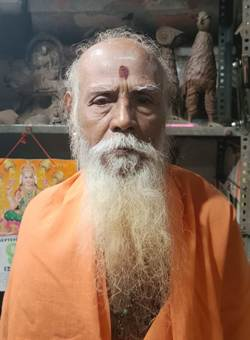
Vidyasankar Sthapathy

Vidyasankar Sthapathy (born 6 June 1938), is a sculptor from Tamil Nadu, India. He was born in Karur, and lives in Kumbakonam in Thanjavur district.

== Lineage ==
He comes from a long lineage of sculptors dating back to several centuries perhaps as far back as the building of Brihadisvara Temple in Thanjavur in the 11th century A.D. He trained in all classical sculptures and iconometrics of traditional sculpture but chose to forge his own path.

== Position held ==
He had served at the Government College of Fine Arts, Kumbakonam as its principal and retired from service. He continues to sculpt.

== Style and Notable works ==
He has experimented with many subjects in many ways. He used sheet metal, lime plaster, bronze, wire, and stone. He was part of the Madras Movement in the 1960s and 1970s which looked into traditions and folk art to anchor their ideas about art. In 1964, he used a two-dimensional sheet meal and brought it out as a three-dimensional sculpture. Only after that, his fellow artists began doing something similar. He happens to be the only craftsman who turned to contemporary sculpture and is one of the pioneers of the Madras Metaphor (the contemporary sculpture movement in Madras). He specializes in sheet metal sculpture. His work speaks volumes about him. After gaining immense knowledge in Sirpa Sastra and the Vedas, he went on to create his own style in his works. He was rooted in tradition and stayed within the grammar of Sirpa Sastra, without breaking the norms, but was modern in his artistic expression. Some of his remarkable works include his depiction of Nataraja, a woman on a swing and his stylised form of Jesus Christ, to name a few. Based on this style he created Rati, Vinayaka, Ravana and others.

== Madras Metaphor ==
The constellation of sculptors include S Dhanapal [1916-2000], P V Janakiram [1925-1995], Vidyasankar Sthapathy, C Dakshinamoorthy, P S Nandhan, S Paramasivam and S Nandagopal. This group had banded together in 1991 to showcase their works in Mumbai. It was reviewed by the well-known art critic, S V Vasudev, under the heading The Madras Metaphor. This title continues to be the identifying hallmark of the group, which has had shows in Calcutta, Mumbai and Chennai in 1991, followed by similar shows under the same name in 1992, 1995, 1998, 2003 and now in 2006.

== Awards received ==
He received many awards which include Madras Ceramics Art Show (1961), Madras Art Club Exhibition (1963), Madras State Lalit Kala Akademi (1964, 1978, 1985), Mysore Dasara Cultural Exhibition (1973), "National Award", New Delhi (1993), "Kalai Chemmal", Department of Arts and Culture, Tamil Nadu (1996), VI All India Veteran Artist, All India Fine Arts Crafts Society, New Delhi (1999), Bombay Arts Society (1976), All India Art Contest, Nagpur (1995), "Gowri Shankar Sthapathy Award", Visvakarma Kalamandram, Chennai (1998) and "Shilpakalarathinam", Thiruvaduthurai Adheenam (2011). He is featured in the book 'The Madras Metaphor' by Oxford University Press.

== See also ==
- Hindu temple architecture
- V. Ganapati Sthapati
- S. M. Ganapathy
- Muthiah Sthapati
