= Vatavaranyeswarar Temple =

Shiva temple in Tamil Nadu, India

Vatavaranyeswarar Temple is a Hindu temple located at Thiruvalangadu in the Mayiladuthurai district of Tamil Nadu, India. The temple is dedicated to Shiva and administered by the Thiruvaduthurai Adheenam.

== History ==
The temple is associated with the legends of Karaikal Ammaiyar who is believed to have attained mukthi at this place. The present temple dates from the Chola period and the last kumbabishekham was performed during the reign of Kulothunga Chola III.
