= Kailash Manav =

Indian social worker

- Born: Kailash Chandra Agarwal; 2 January 1947 (age 79); Bhindar, Rajasthan, India
- Occupation: Social worker
- Known for: Founder of Narayan Seva Sansthan
- Website: www.kailashmanav.com

Kailash Manav (born 2 January 1947) is an Indian social worker and founder of Narayan Seva Sansthan, a non-governmental organisation based in Udaipur, Rajasthan, that works in the field of disability rehabilitation and social welfare.

== Early life and career ==
Kailash Manav was born in Bhindar in present-day Udaipur district of Rajasthan, India. Before entering social work, he worked in the Department of Posts and Telegraphs under the Government of India.

In 1985, he founded Narayan Seva Sansthan in Udaipur. The organisation conducts activities related to corrective surgeries, rehabilitation support, physiotherapy, artificial limb fitment, vocational training, and mobility assistance for persons with disabilities from economically weaker backgrounds.

== Awards and recognition ==
In 2003, Manav received the National Award for the Welfare of Persons with Disabilities from former President of India A. P. J. Abdul Kalam.

In 2008, he was awarded the Padma Shri, India's fourth-highest civilian award, by former President of India Pratibha Patil for his work in social service.

In 2011, he received another national-level recognition related to disability welfare at Balyogi Auditorium, Parliament House, New Delhi.

In 2023–24, he received the Lakshmipati Singhania – IIM Lucknow National Leadership Award for work related to community service and social welfare.
