= Reenat Sandhu =

Indian diplomat

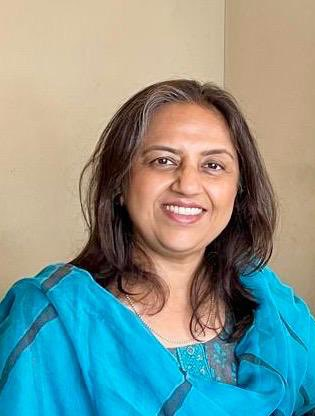

Indian Ambassador to Italy and San Marino
- In office 9 July 2017 – September 2020
- Preceded by: Anil Wadhwa

Additional Secretary (Indo-Pacific, South, Oceania)
- In office September 2020 – 2021

Secretary (West)
- In office 2021–2022

Personal details
- Born: 7 June 1964 (age 62)
- Spouse: Taranjit Singh Sandhu
- Children: 2
- Education: Delhi School of Economics
- Occupation: Diplomat IFS

Reenat Sandhu (born 7 June 1964) is a retired Indian diplomat and former ambassador of India to the Netherlands. She had previously served as Secretary West in the Ministry of External Affairs and as the Indian Ambassador to Italy and San Marino.

== Personal life ==
Sandhu holds a Master of Arts degree in Economics from the Delhi School of Economics. She is married to Taranjit Singh Sandhu who served as Ambassador of India to the United States. They have two children.

== Career ==
Reenat Sandhu joined the Indian Foreign Service in August 1989. She has served at the Indian missions in Moscow, Kyiv, Washington, D.C., Colombo, New York and Geneva. She has also worked at the Ministry of External Affairs in New Delhi and handled Investment and Trade Promotion, Projects, East Europe and Sri Lanka desks.

She was the Deputy Permanent Representative of India to the World Trade Organization in Geneva from 2011 to 2014. From 2014 to 2017, she was the Minister (Commerce) and later the Deputy Chief of Mission at the Indian Embassy in Washington, D.C.

Sandhu was made the first Additional Secretary of the new Oceania vertical in the MEA, including the former Indo-Pacific and South divisions. Following this she became Secretary (West) and served there till February 2022.
