= Gopal Bagalay =

Indian diplomat & Indian High Commissioner to Australia

Gopal Baglay IFS
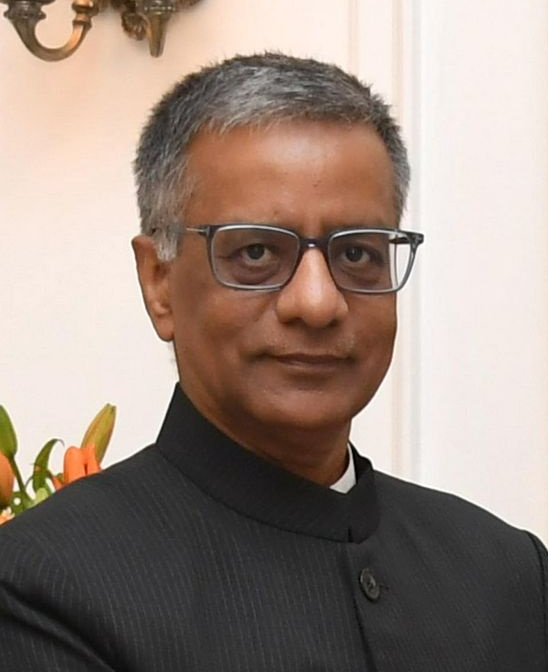

High Commissioner of India to Australia
- In office 1 January 2024 – 31 January 2026
- Appointed by: Droupadi Murmu
- Preceded by: Manpreet Vohra
- Succeeded by: Nagesh Singh

High Commissioner of India to Sri Lanka
- In office May 2020 – December 2023
- Appointed by: Ram Nath Kovind
- Preceded by: Taranjit Singh Sandhu
- Succeeded by: Santosh Jha

Joint Secretary at Prime Minister’s Office
- In office July 2017 – May 2020

Official Spokesperson of the Ministry of External Affairs
- In office February 2020 – July 2020
- Preceded by: Vikas Swarup
- Succeeded by: Raveesh Kumar

Personal details
- Born: 4 January 1966 (age 60) Mathura, Uttar Pradesh, India
- Education: Lucknow University

Gopal Baglay (born 4 January 1966) is a retired Indian diplomat of Indian Foreign Service who served as the Indian High Commissioner to Australia. He has previously served as Indian High Commissioner to Sri Lanka, been the Official Spokesperson of the Ministry of External Affairs, and Joint secretary in Prime Minister's Office.
