= Anurag Srivastava =

Indian Ambassador to Mauritius

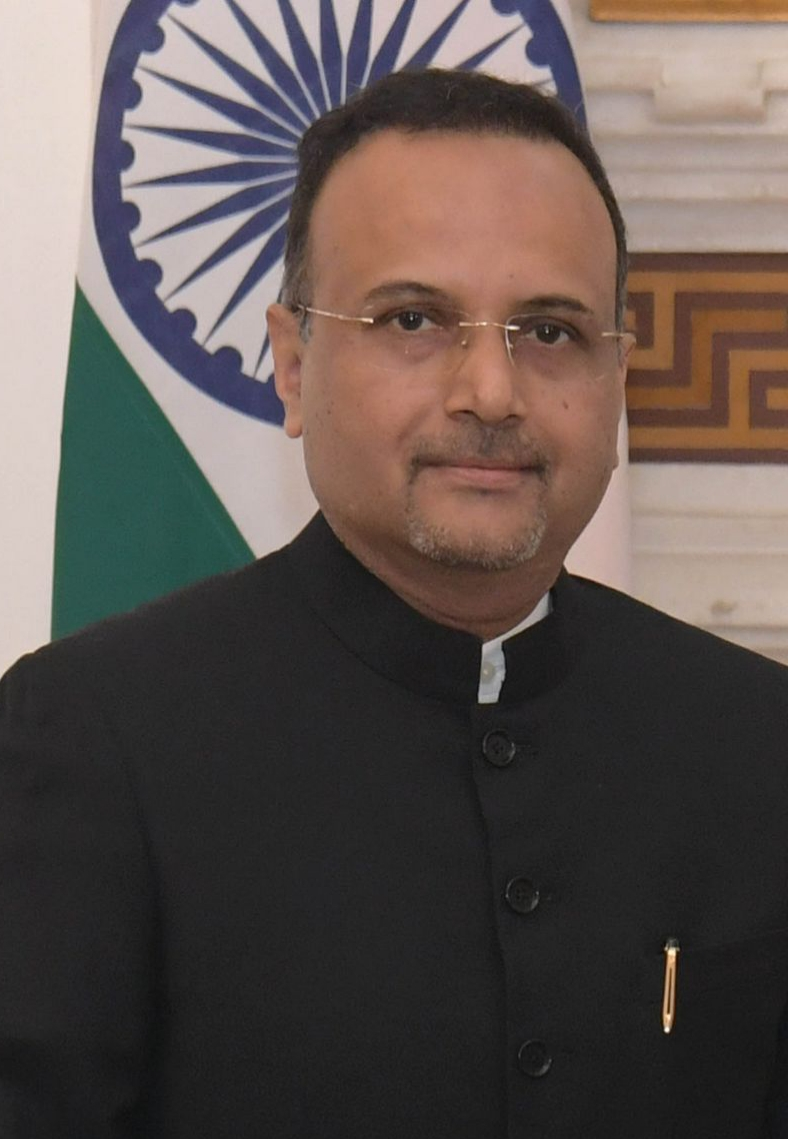

High Commissioner of India to Mauritius
- Incumbent
- Assumed office 16 December 2024
- Preceded by: K Nandini Singla

Official Spokesperson of the Ministry of External Affairs
- In office 7 April 2020 – 20 March 2021
- Prime Minister: Narendra Modi
- Preceded by: Raveesh Kumar
- Succeeded by: Arindam Bagchi

Personal details
- Born: 5 July 1972 (age 54) India
- Education: (B.Tech) NIT Jaipur (MBA) FMS-Delhi University (Diploma)University of Oxford
- Profession: Diplomat

Anurag Srivastava is an Indian diplomat from 1999 batch of the Indian Foreign Service who is currently serving as Indian High Commissioner to Mauritius and previously served as spokesperson of the Ministry of External Affairs, India.

Previously he was the Ambassador of India to Ethiopia and African Union.

== Early life ==
Srivastava holds a bachelor's degree in Engineering from Malaviya National Institute of Technology, Jaipur in 1993 and has an MBA (Master of Business Administration) from the Faculty of Management Studies, Delhi (FMS, Delhi) in '96, and also holds a Postgraduate Diploma in Diplomatic Studies from the University of Oxford, United Kingdom. He joined the Indian Foreign Service in 1999.

== Career ==
Srivastava served at India's Permanent Mission to the United Nations (UN) in Geneva where his works are related to human rights, refugee issues and trade policy. Before he was appointed as Indian Ambassador to Ethiopia, Srivastava was heading the Finance Division of the Ministry of External Affairs (MEA), Government of India, which is tasked to administer its annual budget of about US$2 billion. He was head of the political wing at the Indian high commission in Sri Lanka and was closely involved in India's development assistance projects. Sri Lanka He has also held different positions in MEA at its headquarters in New Delhi, including in the Pakistan-Afghanistan-Iran division and in the External Publicity Division. In September 2016, he was accredited as the Indian ambassador to the Republic of Djibouti.
