= Randhir Jaiswal =

Spokesperson of Ministry of External Affairs of India

Randhir Jaiswal IFS
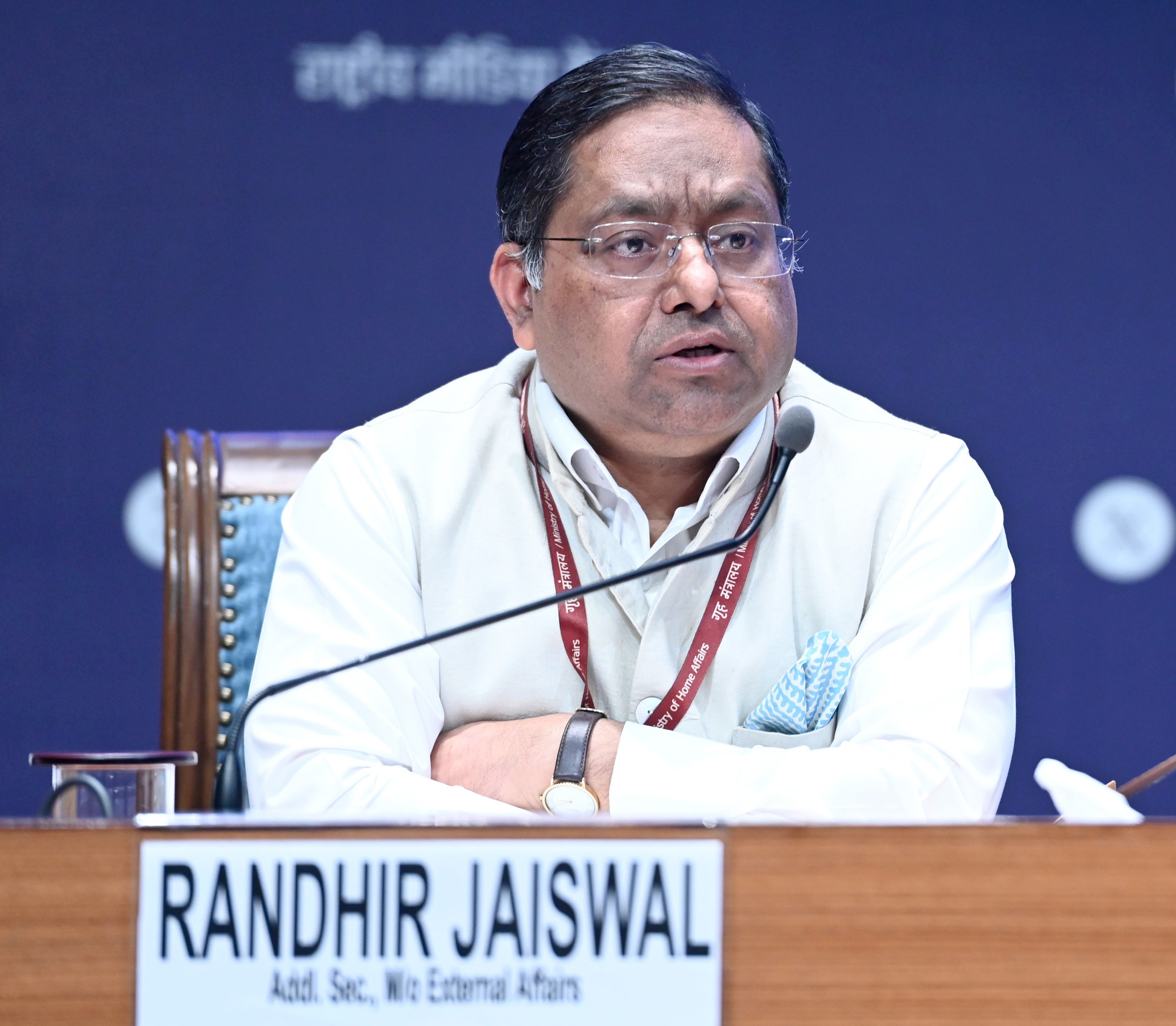
- Jaiswal in june 2026

Official Spokesperson of the Ministry of External Affairs
- Incumbent
- Assumed office 3 January 2024
- Prime Minister: Narendra Modi
- Preceded by: Arindam Bagchi

Personal details
- Born: Vaishali district, Bihar, India
- Education: M.A. (History)
- Alma mater: Delhi University
- Rank: Additional Secretary

Randhir Jaiswal is an Indian diplomat of 1998 batch of Indian Foreign Service and is currently serving as the Official Spokesperson of the Ministry of External Affairs of India.

== Diplomatic Career ==
Randhir Jaiswal is a 1998 batch Indian Foreign Service officer. He has served in various capacities in Indian missions abroad and at the Ministry of External Affairs in New Delhi.

=== Early career ===
Jaiswal was raised in Bihar. He studied at Bishop Westcott Boys' School in Ranchi, and holds a master's degree in history from Delhi University. Jaiswal's early postings included assignments in Portugal, Cuba, South Africa, and at India's Permanent Mission to the United Nations in New York.

=== Consul General of India in New York ===
In July 2020, Jaiswal was appointed as the Consul General of India in New York. During his tenure, he was actively involved in the repatriation of Indian Americans during the COVID-19 pandemic and worked to strengthen the bonds between India and the US.

=== Joint Secretary to the President of India ===
Prior to his posting in New York, Jaiswal served as the Joint Secretary cum Social Secretary to the President of India, Ram Nath Kovind. In this role, he led the foreign affairs office of the Rashtrapati Bhavan and advised the President on India's foreign policy.

Indian Prime Minister Narendra Modi meets Bangladesh’s Chief Adviser Muhammad Yunus in Bangkok, Thailand, on 4 April 2025. Randhir is seated fifth from the right.

=== Official Spokesperson of the Ministry of External Affairs ===
In January 2024, Jaiswal assumed the charge of the Official Spokesperson of the Ministry of External Affairs. In this capacity, he holds routine weekly press conferences and moderates other press briefings and conferences concerning Indian foreign policy.

=== Other Assignments ===
Jaiswal has also served as Deputy Secretary looking after India's relations with the United States of America and as Joint Secretary managing India's relations with West European countries. He has been part of India's delegation at various climate change conferences and was the lead negotiator for the G77 countries at the RIO+20 Conference held in Brazil in 2012.

== Viral BRICS summit video ==
In September 2026, a video of Indian Ministry of External Affairs spokesperson Randhir Jaiswal eating nuts and dried fruits during the BRICS Summit in New Delhi went viral on social media. Jaiswal was seated behind Iranian President Masoud Pezeshkian as Pezeshkian addressed the summit, and footage showed Jaiswal repeatedly taking snacks from a container placed on the table, eating them and licking his fingers before reaching for more. The video prompted criticism, mockery and other mixed reactions from social media users.
