= List of high commissioners of India to Sri Lanka =

Head of mission of India to Sri Lanka

High Commissioner of India to Sri Lanka

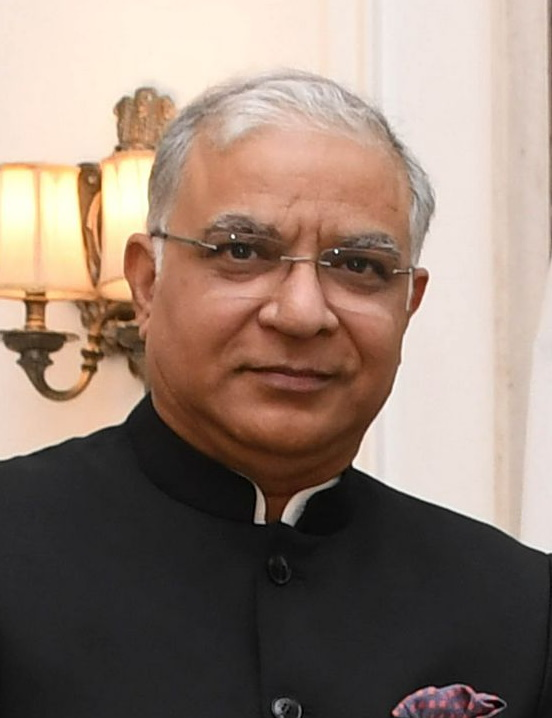
- Incumbent; Santosh Jha since 23 December 2023
- Ministry of External Affairs
- Style: His Excellency
- Reports to: Minister for External Affairs
- Seat: Colombo
- Appointer: President of India
- Inaugural holder: V. V. Giri
- Formation: 1947
- Website: High Commission of India, Colombo

The High Commissioner of India to Sri Lanka, formerly the High Commissioner of India to Ceylon, is the chief diplomatic representative of India to Sri Lanka. The high commission is located in Colombo.

== History ==
India's diplomatic mission to the Dominion of Ceylon was created following India's independence in 1947. Since both nations became part of the Commonwealth of Nations, the diplomatic mission was designated as a high commission, rather than an embassy. V. V. Giri was appointed as the inaugural high commissioner by Governor-General Lord Mountbatten and remained in office until 1951.

Following Ceylon's becoming a republic in 1972, the mission was re-designated to Sri Lanka and the position was renamed to as the High Commissioner of India to Sri Lanka.

== List ==
- Ref:

#	Portrait	Name	Took office	Left office	Appointer (Head of state)	Notes
1		V. V. Giri	1947	1951	Lord Mountbatten	Later President of India (1969–1974)
2		K. P. Kesava Menon	1951	1952	Rajendra Prasad	
3		Chandulal Chunilal Desai	1953	1954	Rajendra Prasad	Later Member of Parliament, Lok Sabha (1967–1973)
4		Birendra Narayan Chakraborty, ICS	1955	1956	Rajendra Prasad	Later Governor of Haryana (1967–1976)
5		Y. D. Gundevia, ICS	1957	1960	Rajendra Prasad	First term; later Foreign Secretary (1963–1965)
6		B. K. Kapur, ICS	1960	1964	Rajendra Prasad	
7		Bhim Sen Sachar	1964	1967	Sarvepalli Radhakrishnan	Formerly Chief Minister of Punjab (1949; 1952–1956); Governor of Orissa (1956–1957) and Andhra Pradesh (1957–1962)
(5)		Y. D. Gundevia, ICS	1967	1969	Sarvepalli Radhakrishnan	Second term; formerly Foreign Secretary
8		Yogendra Krishna Puri, IFS	1969	1972	V. V. Giri	
9		V. C. Coelho, IFS	1973	1975	V. V. Giri	
10		Gurbachan Singh, IFS	1975	1978	Fakhruddin Ali Ahmed	
11		Thomas Abraham, IFS	1978	1982	Neelam Sanjiva Reddy	
12		Surbir Jit Singh Chhatwal, IFS	1982	1985	Zail Singh	
13		Jyotindra Nath Dixit, IFS	1985	1989 (Note: Appointed as the High Commissioner to Pakistan)	Zail Singh	Later Foreign Secretary (1991–1994); and National Security Advisor (2004–2005)
14		Lakhan Lal Mehrotra, IFS	1989	1990	Ramaswamy Venkataraman	
15		Nagendra Nath Jha, IFS	1990	1993	Ramaswamy Venkataraman	Later Lieutenant Governor of Andaman and Nicobar Islands (2001–2004); and Lieutenant Governor of Pondicherry (2004)
16		Nareshwar Dayal, IFS	1993	1997	Shankar Dayal Sharma	
17		Shivshankar Menon, IFS	1997	2000 (Note: Appointed as the Ambassador to China)	K. R. Narayanan	Later Foreign Secretary (2006–2009); and National Security Advisor (2010–2014)
18		Gopalkrishna Gandhi, IAS	2000	2002 (Note: Appointed as the Ambassador to Norway and Iceland)	K. R. Narayanan	Formerly Secretary to the President of India (1997–2000); and later Governor of West Bengal (2004–2009)
19		Nirupem Sen, IFS	2002	2004 (Note: Appointed as the Permanent Representative to the United Nations)	K. R. Narayanan	
20		Nirupama Rao, IFS	2004	2006	A. P. J. Abdul Kalam	Later Foreign Secretary (2009–2011)
21		Alok Prasad, IFS	2006	2009	A. P. J. Abdul Kalam	Later Deputy National Security Advisor (2009–2011)
22		Ashok Kantha, IFS	2009	2013	Pratibha Patil	
23		Yashvardhan Kumar Sinha, IFS	2013	2016 (Note: Appointed as the High Commissioner to the United Kingdom)	Pranab Mukherjee	Later Chief Information Commissioner (2020–2023)
24		Taranjit Singh Sandhu, IFS	2017	2020 (Note: Appointed as the Ambassador to the United States)	Pranab Mukherjee	
25		Gopal Bagalay, IFS	2020	2023 (Note: Appointed as the High Commissioner to Australia)	Ram Nath Kovind	
26		Santosh Jha, IFS	2023	Incumbent	Droupadi Murmu	
