= Official Spokesperson of the Ministry of External Affairs =

Spokesperson of Indian Foreign Ministry

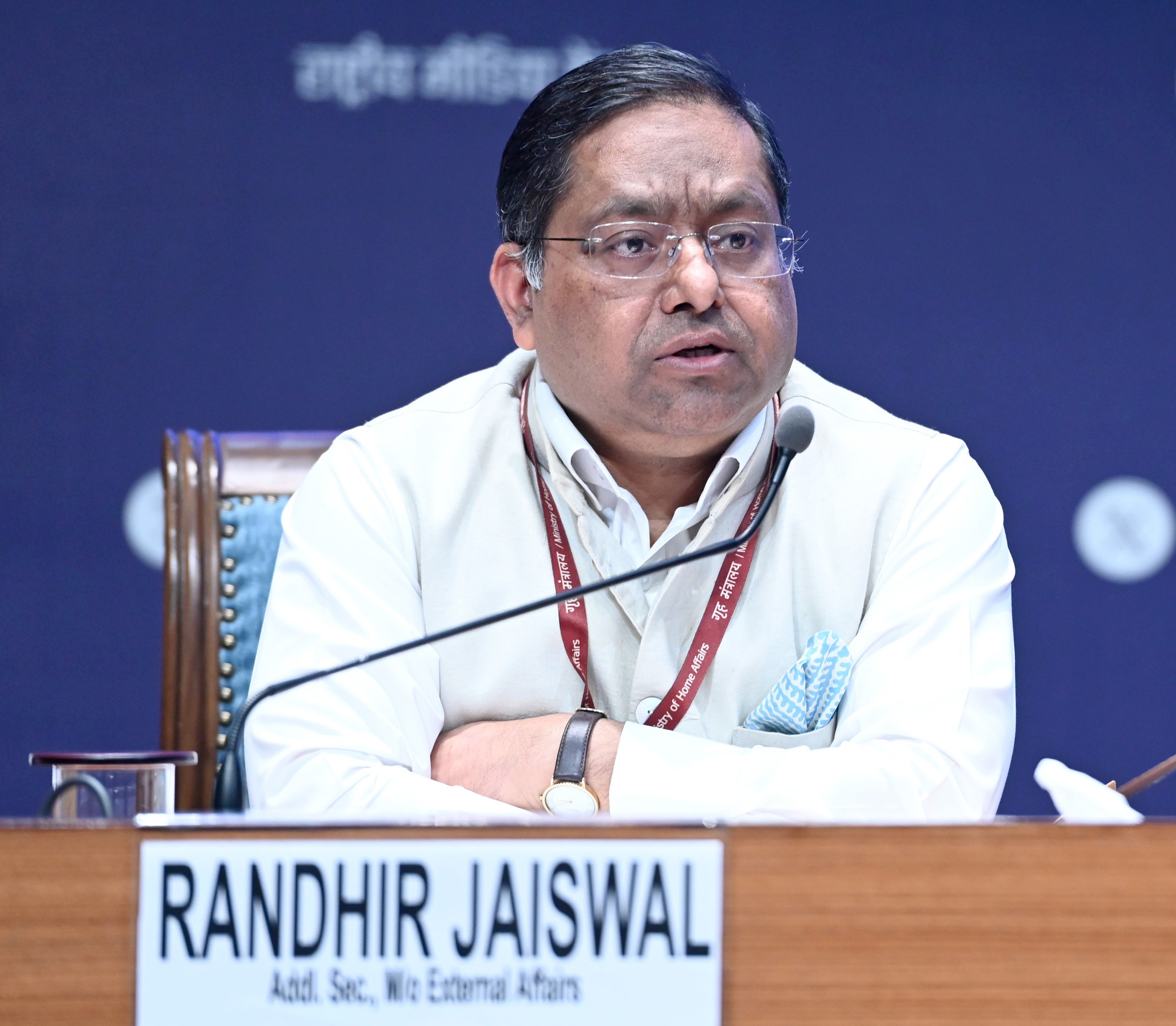
- Incumbent; Randhir Jaiswal since 3 January 2024
- External Publicity Division (XP)
- Type: Joint Secretary
- Abbreviation: JS-XP and Spokesperson
- Seat: Shastri Bhawan, New Delhi
- Appointer: Ministry of External Affairs
- Website: Official website

The Official Spokesperson of the Ministry of External Affairs is an Indian government official whose primary responsibility is to serve as the spokesperson of the Ministry of External Affairs and to deal with other media affairs relating to Indian foreign policy. The spokesperson is usually a Joint Secretary rank officer, and formally heads the External Publicity division in the Ministry.

Currently, Randhir Jaiswal, an officer of the 1998 batch of Indian Foreign Service is the Official Spokesperson of the Ministry of External Affairs.

== Roles and functions ==
The Official Spokesperson and Joint Secretary (External Publicity) is the interface of the Ministry of External Affairs with the media. Its role includes:

- Releasing statements and giving speeches on behalf of the Ministry of External Affairs or of the Government of India informing its official position.
- Issuing Press Releases.
- Responding to Media queries.
- Media briefings.

== List of Official Spokespersons ==
#	Name	Photo	From	To	Ref(s)
33	Randhir Jaiswal	Jaiswal in 2026	3 January 2024	Incumbent	
32	Arindam Bagchi		21 March 2021	2 January 2024	
31	Anurag Srivastava		7 April 2020	20 March 2021	
30	Raveesh Kumar		21 July 2017	6 April 2020	
29	Gopal Baglay		1 March 2017	20 July 2017	
28	Vikas Swarup		18 April 2015	28 February 2017	
27	Syed Akbaruddin		7 December 2011	18 April 2015	
26	Vishnu Prakash		2008	2011	
25	Navtej Sarna		2002	2008	
24	Nirupama Rao		2001	2002	
23	Raminder Jassal		1999	2001	
22	Krishan Chander Singh		1998	1999	
21	Pavan Varma		1997	1998	
20	Talmiz Ahmad		1997	1997	
19	Arif Khan		1994	1997	
18	Shiv Shankar Mukherjee		1992	1994	
17	Aftab Seth		1988	1992	
16	Gopalaswami Parthasarathy		1985	1988	
15	Salman Haider		1983	1985	
14	Mani Shankar Aiyer		1982	1983	
13	J. N. Dixit		1979	1982	
12	S. V. Purushottam		1976	1979	
11	A. N. D. Haksar		1973	1976	
10	Shilendra Kumar Singh		1969	1973	
9	A. B. Bhadkar		1968	1969	
8	Rikhi Jaipal		1967	1968	
7	I. J. Bhadur		1964	1967	
6	M. A. Rahman		1962	1964	
5	P. N. Menon		1959	1962	
4	Ramchundur Goburdhun		1958	1959	
3	P. N. Haksar		1955	1958	
2	R. Ramamirtham		1954	1955	
1	V. R. Bhatt		1949	1954	

== See also ==
- Additional secretary to the Government of India
- Joint secretary to the Government of India
