= Parliament House, New Delhi =

Seat of the Parliament of India

Parliament House
- Saṁsada Bhavana
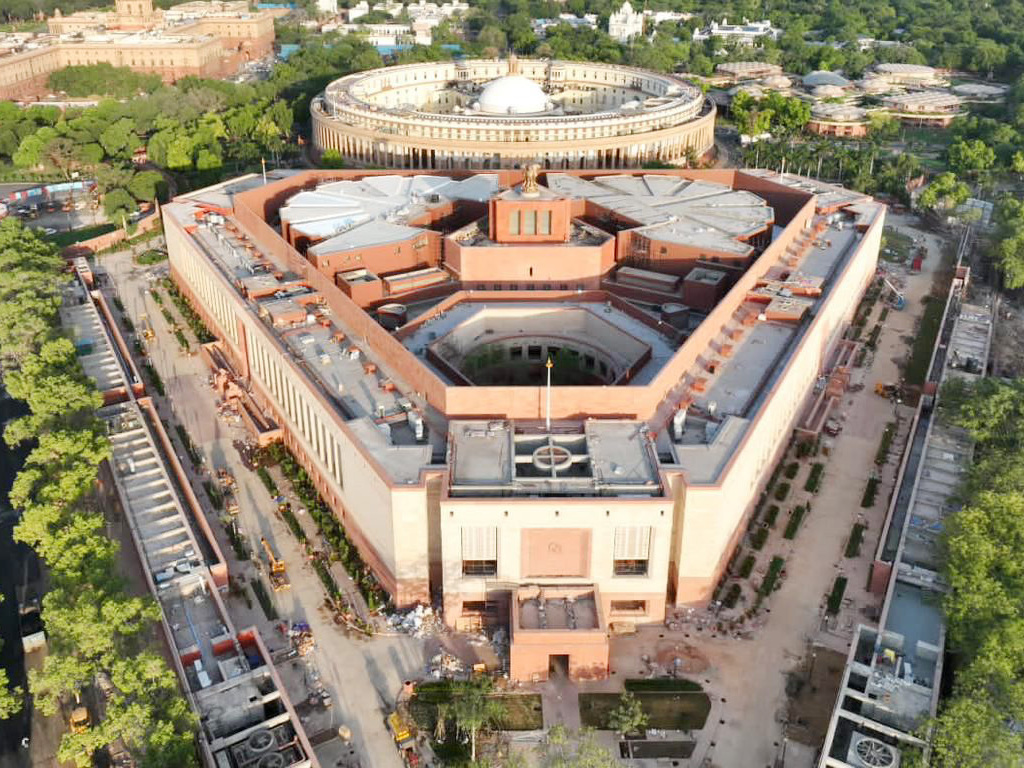
- The Parliament House with the Old Parliament House in the background

General information
- Location: 118, Rafi Marg, New Delhi, India
- Coordinates: 28°37′02″N 77°12′36″E
- Current tenants: Parliament of India
- Groundbreaking: 1 October 2020
- Completed: 20 May 2023
- Opened: 28 May 2023; 3 years ago
- Client: Central Public Works Department
- Owner: Government of India

Height
- Height: 39.6 metres

Technical details
- Floor count: 4
- Grounds: 64,500 m^{2} (694,000 sq ft)

Design and construction
- Architect: Bimal Patel
- Architecture firm: HCP Design, Planning and Management
- Main contractor: Tata Projects

Other information
- Seating capacity: 1,272 (Lok Sabha chamber: 888; Rajya Sabha chamber: 384)
- Public transit: Central Secretariat

Website
- sansad.in

Parliament House (ISO: Saṁsada Bhavana) is the seat of the Parliament of India, located in New Delhi. It houses the Lok Sabha and the Rajya Sabha, which are the lower and upper houses respectively in India's bicameral parliament. It is located on Rafi Marg in Central Vista, the central administrative area in New Delhi, and positioned to the east of the Old Parliament House, amongst the other administrative buildings of the Indian government.

The Old Parliament House was constructed in 1927. Proposals for a new parliament building to replace the old one emerged in the early 2010s due to the ageing of the old building. In 2019, the proposal to construct a new parliament building was unveiled by the Government of India as part of the Central Vista Redevelopment Project. It was inaugurated on 28 May 2023 by Prime Minister Narendra Modi. The new building was first used for official business on 19 September 2023 during a special session of the parliament.

== Background ==
The Old Parliament House is a sandstone building unveiled in January 1927 and was designed by the British architects Edwin Lutyens and Herbert Baker. Calls for a new parliament building to replace the existing complex emerged in the 2010s due to ageing of the old building and space constraints. A committee to suggest alternatives to the current building was set up by the then speaker of the Lok Sabha Meira Kumar in 2012.

== Planning and construction ==
In 2019, the Indian government launched the Central Vista Redevelopment Project, which aimed at redeveloping the area around the Central Vista, the major administrative area in New Delhi. The project included a plan to construct a new parliament building at plot number 118 of the Parliament Estate in Rafi Marg. The new building was designed by architect Bimal Patel for the firm HCP Design, Planning and Management. The construction contract was awarded by the Central Public Works Department to Tata Projects. Tata Projects bid the lowest at ₹8.62 billion (equivalent to ₹11 billion or US$120 million in 2026), ahead of Larsen and Toubro, who had bid ₹8.65 billion (equivalent to ₹11 billion or US$120 million in 2026).

The groundbreaking ceremony for the project was held in October 2020. On 7 December 2020, the Central Vista Redevelopment Project was put on hold by a bench of the Supreme Court of India led by A. M. Khanwilkar until the resolution of pleas received against the project in the court, primarily owing to concerns stemming from noncompliance with land use norms and environmental regulations in the historical British-era precinct. However, the court allowed the foundation laying ceremony to go ahead as planned on 10 December 2020, despite the court expressing displeasure towards the "aggressive" fashion in which the Government of India proceeded with the implementation of the Central Vista Project (including widespread demolition and removal of trees) whilst its legality was the subject of ongoing litigation in the court. The foundation stone was laid by then Prime Minister Narendra Modi on 10 December 2020 in a ceremony that included an interfaith prayer service performed by leaders from various religions. The project was eventually cleared in a majority judgment of the Supreme Court in January 2021, with riders for environmental concerns.

The construction of the building commenced in January 2021. The construction involved sourcing materials from various parts of the country. The red and white sandstone, greenstone, and red granite were procured from Rajasthan, the teak wood from Maharashtra, and the carpets from Uttar Pradesh. On 11 July 2022, a statue of the country's national emblem was unveiled on the top of the new building. The main structure of the building was completed in August 2022. The construction of the entire project was completed on 20 May 2023.

== Design ==
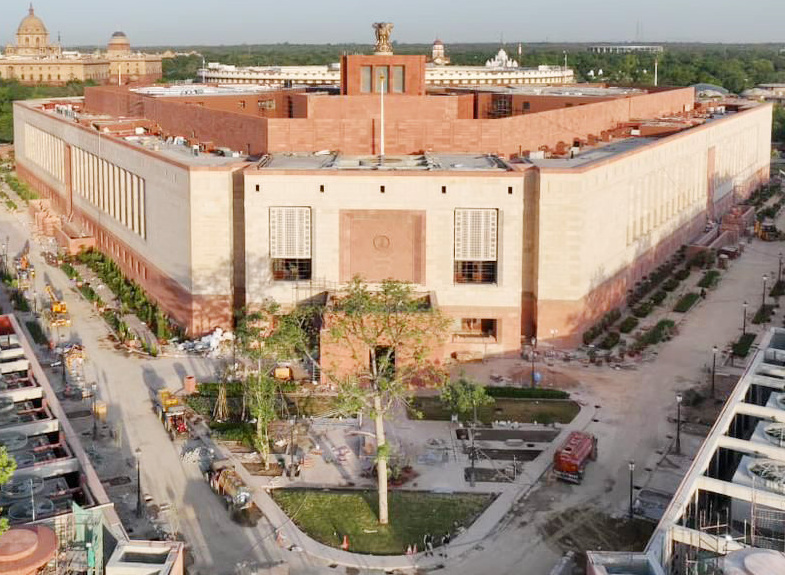
Side view with the sculpture of the Indian emblem mounted on the top

The new building is triangular in shape and is situated besides the old building. Spread across an area of 64,500 m^{2} (694,000 sq ft), the new building has four floors. The building has a built up area of 20,866 m^{2} (224,600 sq ft) with an open-sky area of 2,000 m^{2} (22,000 sq ft), and split into three sections. It is designed to be of the same height as the old building and was built to be earthquake resistant.

The new Parliament House has three gates named, Gyan Dwar (Knowledge gate), Shakti Dwar (Power gate), and Karma Dwar (Karma gate). The building has six entrances named after mythological creatures, those being Gaja (elephant), Ashva (horse), Garuda (eagle like bird), Makara (sea creature), Shardula (composite animal with a lion's body and head of another animal), and Hamsa (swan), whose statues stand guard on both sides of the respective entrances. The Indian flag is hoisted at the Gaja Dwar, and the Makara Dwar opens up to the old parliament building. A large 6.5 m (21 ft) high cast sculpture of the Indian national emblem, weighing 9,500 kg (20,900 lb), is placed on top of the building.

The three sections of the building are based on India's national symbols, those being the banyan tree, the peacock, and the lotus. The complex has separate chambers for the Lok Sabha and the Rajya Sabha, the two houses of India's bicameral legislature. The Lok Sabha chamber is designed on a blue-green theme, and has a seating capacity for 888 members. The Rajya Sabha chamber is designed on a red theme, and has a seating capacity for 384 members. The Lok Sabha chamber can be expanded to house 1,272 members in case of a joint session of the parliament. A sculpture of the Ashoka Chakra is placed above the speaker's seat in both of the chambers. The Sengol, a silver and gold plated 1.5 m (5 ft) long sceptre adorned by the image of a Nandi, is placed besides the seat of the speaker in the Lok Sabha chamber.

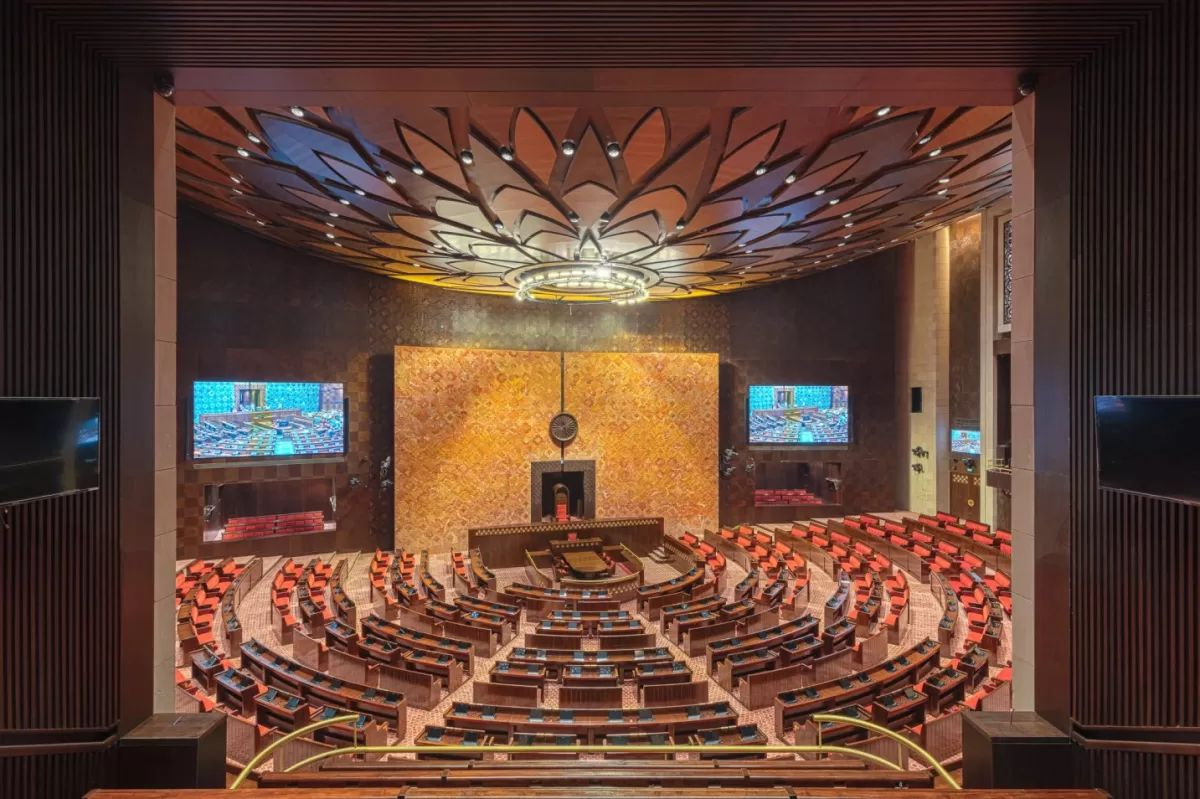
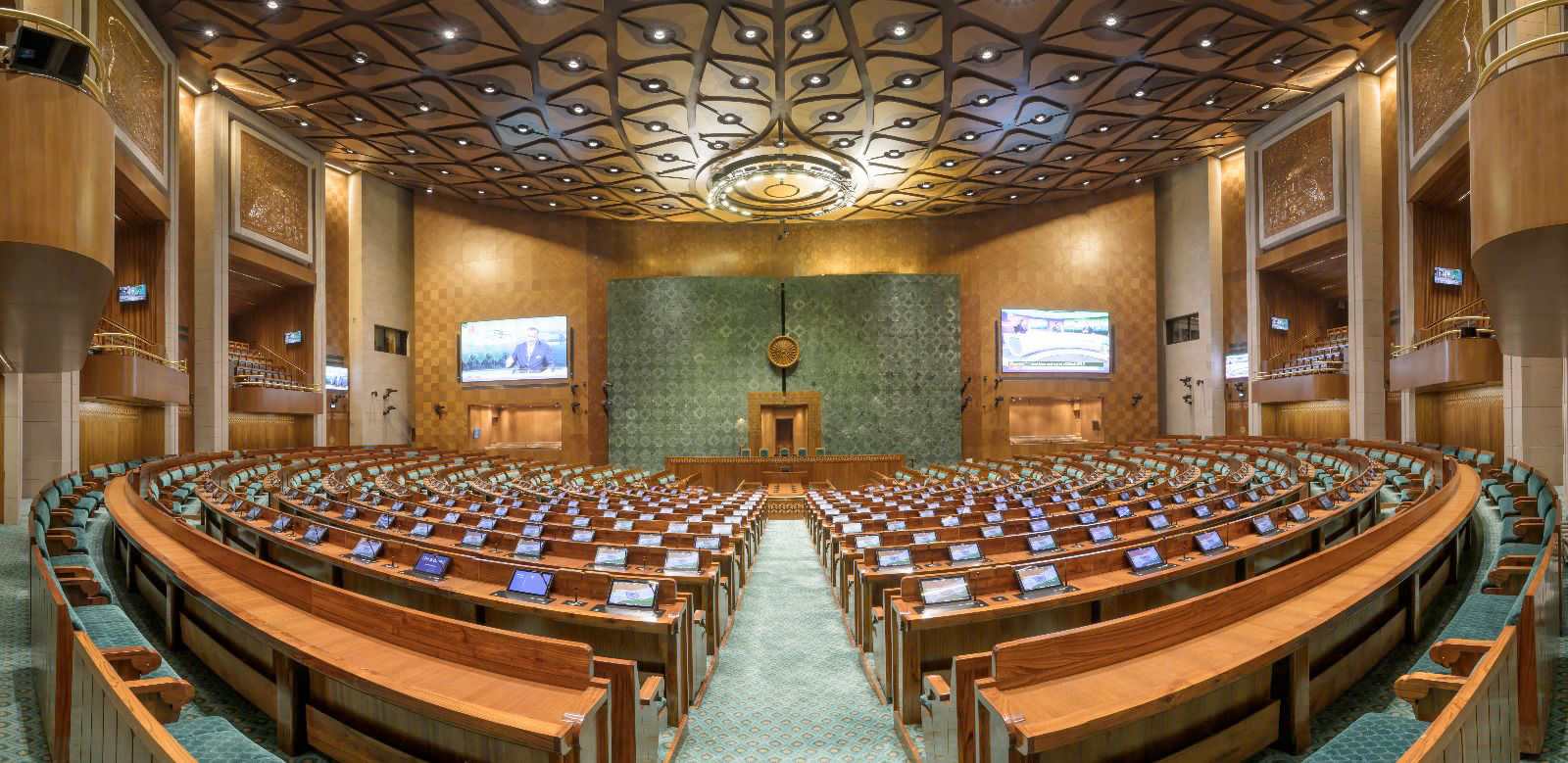
Rajya Sabha (left) and Lok Sabha chambers

The building also hosts a central Grand Constitution Hall, and a banyan tree in the open sky area. There are separate offices for the members, as well as a library and a lounge in the complex. The crafts gallery (Shilp Deergha) was conceptualised with eight themes: Parv (festival), Swabalamban (self-reliance), Prakriti (nature), Ullas (joy), Gyan (wisdom), Samrasta (harmony), Astha (faith), and Yatra (journey). It consists of about 255 crafts sourced from around 400 artisans from across the country. There are statues of Mahatma Gandhi and Chanakya in the premises of the new building. A foucault pendulum, created by the National Council of Science Museums, is suspended from the ceiling of the central foyer and measures 22 m (72 ft) in height 22 meters and weighs 36 kg (79 lb).

== Inauguration ==
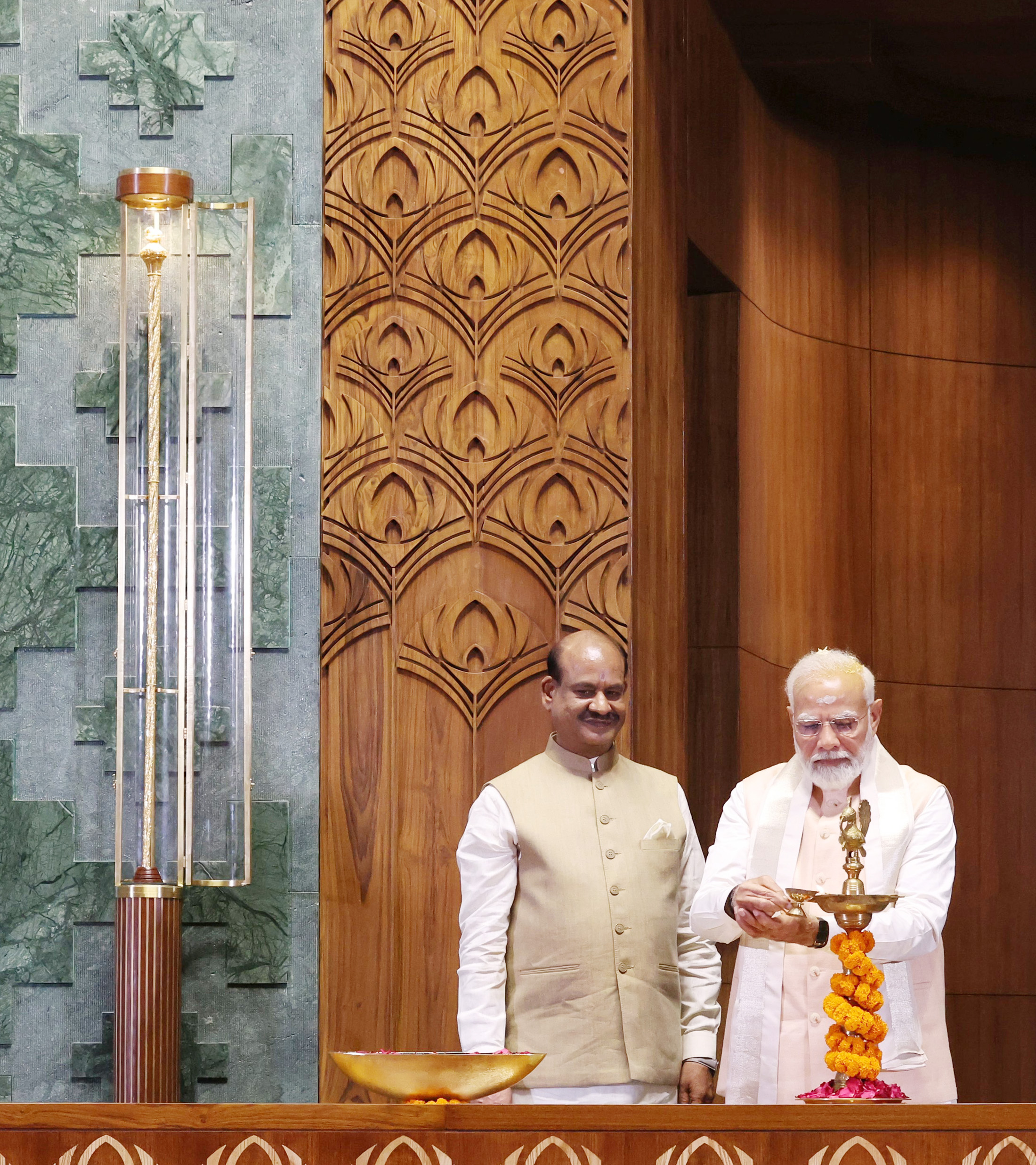
Prime Minister Narendra Modi (right) lighting a Hindu ceremonious lamp during the inauguration of the Parliament House in the presence of Lok Sabha speaker Om Birla (left)

On 28 May 2023, Modi officially opened the new parliament building, and addressed a gathering of lawmakers. As part of the ceremony, the Hindu ritual homa was conducted, followed by a multi-faith prayer. The Sengol was installed following Tamil Hindu traditions, after being handed over by the Adheenams (Shaivite priests) to Modi. The inauguration ceremony was steeped in Hindu religious symbolism, eliciting criticism that the event was not in line with secularism.

=== Boycott by opposition parties ===
Most of the opposition parties boycotted the inauguration event. In a joint statement released by the 19 opposition parties, it was stated that "When the soul of democracy has been sucked out from the Parliament, we find no value in a new building." They expressed concern that the president, the head of state and highest constitutional authority, was sidelined from the event. They also accused the government of passing controversial legislation without adequate debate and criticised the "disqualification, suspension, and muting" of opposition lawmakers. Rahul Gandhi of the Indian National Congress, accused Modi of treating the ceremony like a coronation, and emphasised the need for parliamentary proceedings to remain focused on representing the people rather than showcasing personal grandeur. Congress leader Digvijaya Singh criticised the building's design, claiming it to be a copy of the design of the old Somalian parliament. Despite the boycott and criticism led by the opposition, more than 300 members of parliament attended the inauguration.

=== "Akhand Bharat" mural controversy ===
A mural that resembled the Hindutva irredentist concept of Akhand Bharat (transl. Undivided India) was unveiled during the inauguration. The mural raised concerns among India's neighbours.

On 30 May 2023, Nepal's leader of opposition and former prime minister K. P. Sharma Oli criticised the action stating that "If a country like India that sees itself as an ancient and strong country and as a model of democracy puts Nepali territories in its map and hangs the map in Parliament, it cannot be called fair." Baburam Bhattarai, chairman of the Nepal Socialist Party, stated that the issue "has the potential of further aggravating the trust deficit already vitiating the bilateral relations between most of the immediate neighbours of India."

On 1 June 2023, Mumtaz Zahra Baloch, the spokesperson of Pakistan's ministry of foreign affairs, said that the map was "a manifestation of an expansionist mindset that seeks to subjugate the ideology and culture not only of India’s neighbours but also its religious minorities." On 6 June 2023, Shahriar Alam, Bangladesh's minister of state for foreign affairs stated that his government was in the process of seeking clarification from India regarding the map.

Arindam Bagchi, the spokesperson of India's ministry of external affairs later clarified that the mural depicted the ancient Mauryan empire and propagated a "people-oriented governance." However, on the day of inauguration, India's minister of parliamentary affairs Pralhad Joshi tweeted a photo of the mural with a caption in Kannada, which translates to "Resolve is clear – Akhand Bharat".

== Parliament breach ==
On 13 December 2023, two intruders from the visitor's gallery entered the Lok Sabha chamber and threw smoke bombs. The proceedings of both the houses were adjourned initially before resuming after a while, and the speaker the Lok Sabha Om Birla initiated a probe into the incident. Members of parliament questioned this major security lapse. Four people were arrested including two people inside the building, for the attack. As a result of the incident, visitor rules were changed to include mandatory verifications.
