= Arindam Bagchi =

Senior Indian diplomat

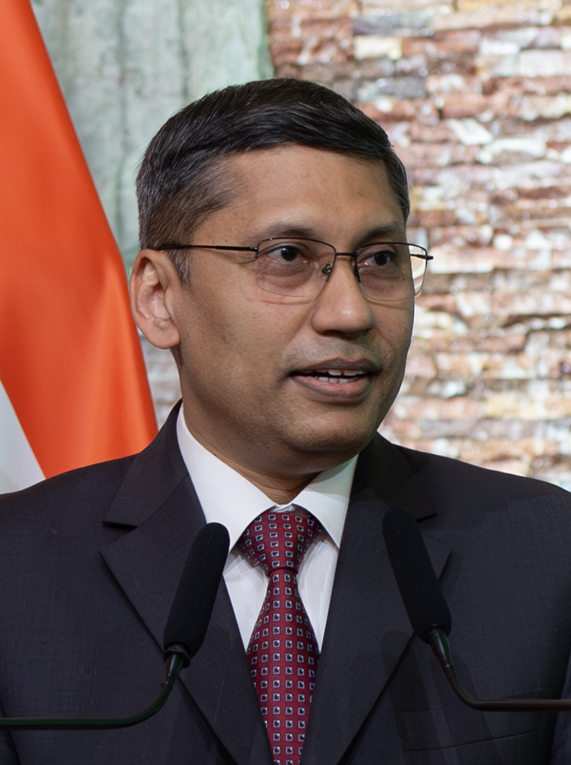

Permanent Representative of India to the UN at Geneva
- Incumbent
- Assumed office 22 January 2024
- Appointed by: Droupadi Murmu
- Preceded by: Indra Mani Pandey

Official Spokesperson of the Ministry of External Affairs
- In office 21 March 2021 – 3 January 2024
- Minister: S. Jaishankar
- Preceded by: Anurag Srivastava
- Succeeded by: Randhir Jaiswal

Ambassador of India to Croatia
- In office November 2018 – June 2020
- Preceded by: Sandeep Kumar
- Succeeded by: Raj Kumar Srivastava

Personal details
- Born: 5 March 1972 (age 54) Kolkata, West Bengal
- Education: B. Sc (Mathematics), MBA
- Alma mater: St. Stephen's College; Delhi University; IIM Ahmedabad

Arindam Bagchi (born 5 March 1972) is an Indian diplomat of Indian Foreign Service. He was appointed the Official Spokesperson of the Ministry of External Affairs in March 2021 and served there till 3 January 2024. On 16 October 2023, he was appointed India's Permanent Representative to the United Nations at Geneva. He has succeeded Indra Mani Pandey and assumed the charge on 5 January 2024.

== Early life ==
Bagchi had been an investment banker for two years before joining the Indian Foreign Service. He has done his graduation in mathematics from the St. Stephen’s College, and post-graduation in management from the Indian Institute of Management Ahmedabad.

== Career ==
He has previously served as Indian ambassador to Croatia from November 2018 to June 2020. His previous assignments include deputy high commissioner to Sri Lanka, and director in the Prime Minister's Office. As the Official Spokesperson of the Ministry, he has handled various critical issues and development like eastern Ladakh border standoff, India's COVID-19 responses and India's G20 presidency.

== See also ==
- Anurag Srivastava
