= Taranjit Singh Sandhu =

Lieutenant Governor of Delhi (born 1963)

Taranjit Singh
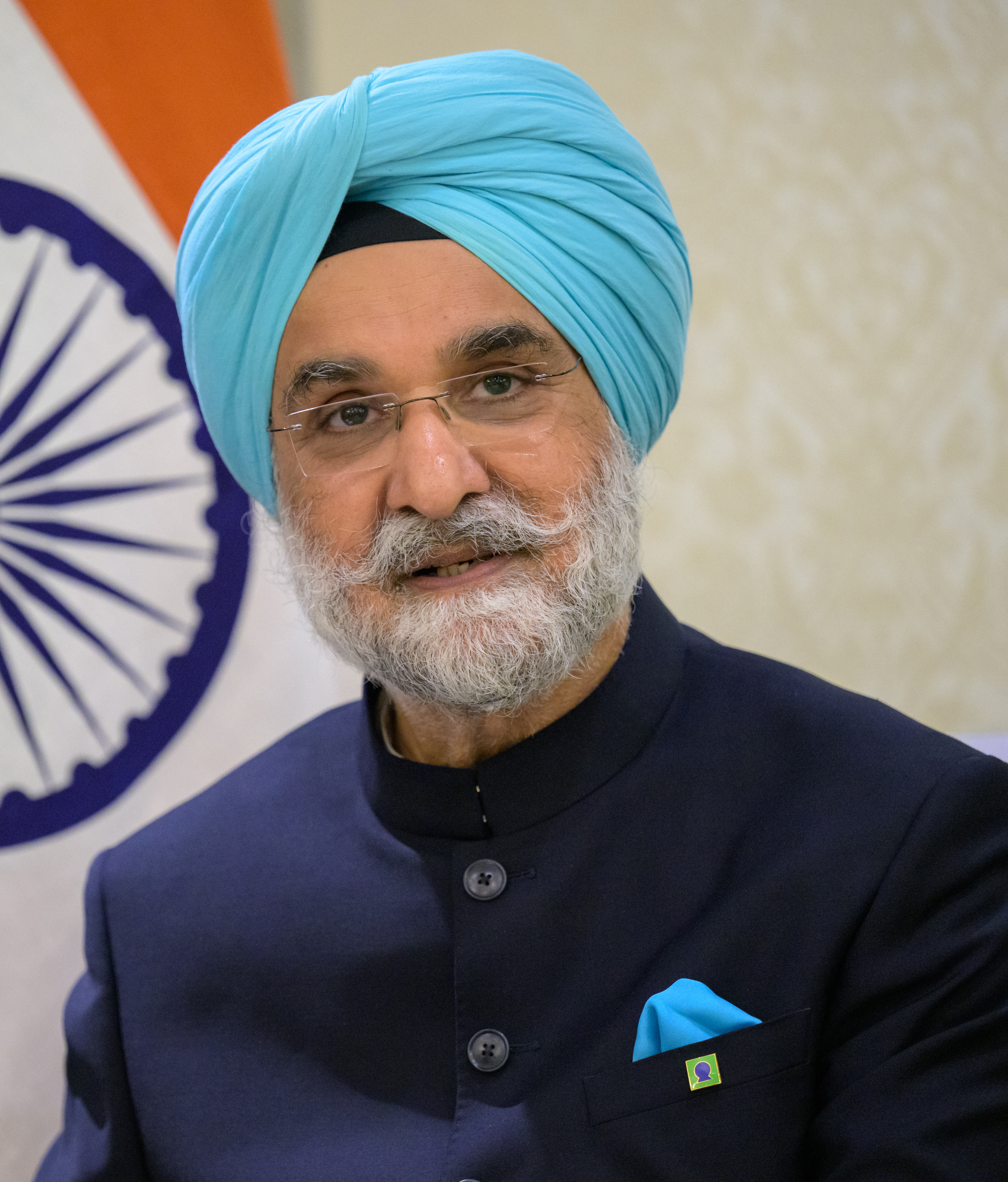
- Sandhu in 2023

Lieutenant Governor of Delhi
- Incumbent
- Assumed office 11 March 2026
- President: Droupadi Murmu
- Prime Minister: Narendra Modi
- Chief Minister: Rekha Gupta
- Preceded by: Vinai Kumar Saxena

28th Ambassador of India to the United States
- In office 6 February 2020 – 31 January 2024
- President: Droupadi Murmu; Ram Nath Kovind
- Prime Minister: Narendra Modi
- Preceded by: Harsh Vardhan Shringla
- Succeeded by: Vinay Mohan Kwatra

High Commissioner of India to Sri Lanka
- In office January 2017 – January 2020
- President: Pranab Mukherjee; Ram Nath Kovind
- Prime Minister: Narendra Modi
- Preceded by: Yashvardhan Kumar Sinha
- Succeeded by: Gopal Bagalay

Personal details
- Born: 23 January 1963 (age 63) Amritsar, Punjab, India
- Party: Bharatiya Janata Party
- Spouse: Reenat Sandhu
- Children: 2
- Education: Delhi University (BA); Jawaharlal Nehru University (MA)
- Occupation: Diplomat

Taranjit Singh Sandhu (born 23 January 1963) is an Indian politician and retired diplomat of Indian Foreign Service who is serving as the 21st Lieutenant Governor of Delhi since 2026. He previously served as High Commissioner of India to Sri Lanka and 28th Ambassador of India to the United States.

== Early life and education ==
Sandhu was born in Amritsar, Punjab. He studied at The Lawrence School, Sanawar. He then earned a BA degree in History from St. Stephen's College, Delhi. He later pursued an MA in International Relations at Jawaharlal Nehru University in Delhi.

== Career ==
=== IFS Training & first posting in Moscow ===
Taranjit Singh Sandhu qualified the UPSC Civil Services Examination and joined the Indian Foreign Service in 1988. After completing the foundation course at Lal Bahadur Shastri National Academy of Administration (LBSNAA) and professional training at the Sushma Swaraj Institute of Foreign Service (SSIFS), he was posted in 1990 to the Embassy of India in Moscow, Soviet Union, as a Third Secretary (political) and later Second Secretary (commercial). During his posting, he also completed Russian language training at Moscow State University in 1992.

=== Establishing relations with Ukraine ===
Following the dissolution of the Soviet Union, in 1992 Sandhu was tasked with helping establish the Embassy of India in Kyiv, Ukraine. He subsequently served there as the Head of the Political and Administration Wings until 1994.

=== Officer of Special Duty in MEA, New Delhi ===
After returning to India, Sandhu served as Officer on Special Duty (Press Relations) in the Ministry of External Affairs from December 1995 to March 1997. In this role, he was responsible for maintaining liaison with foreign media operating in India.

=== First Secretary in Washington D.C. ===
In 1997, he was posted to the Embassy of India in Washington, D.C., United States, where he served as First Secretary (Political) from 1997 to 2000. During this period, he was responsible for handling political affairs and maintaining liaison with the United States Congress.

=== Head of the Political Wing, Colombo ===
From December 2000 to September 2004, Sandhu served at the High Commission of India in Colombo, Sri Lanka, where he headed the Political Wing. In this capacity, he was responsible for overseeing political affairs and monitoring developments in India–Sri Lanka relations.

=== United Nations, New York ===
In July 2005, Sandhu was posted to the Permanent Mission of India to the United Nations in New York City, United States, where he served until February 2009. During this period, he represented India in various multilateral forums and participated in discussions and negotiations on key global issues at the United Nations.

=== Joint Secretary in MEA, New Delhi ===
After completing his assignment in New York, Sandhu returned to India and served as Joint Secretary in the Ministry of External Affairs from March 2009 to August 2011, coordinating India's UN policy, multilateral diplomacy, and engagement with global governance institutions. He later served as Joint Secretary (Administration), heading the Human Resource Division and overseeing personnel management, postings, and administrative matters for the Indian Foreign Service and ministry staff.

=== Consul General of India in Frankfurt ===
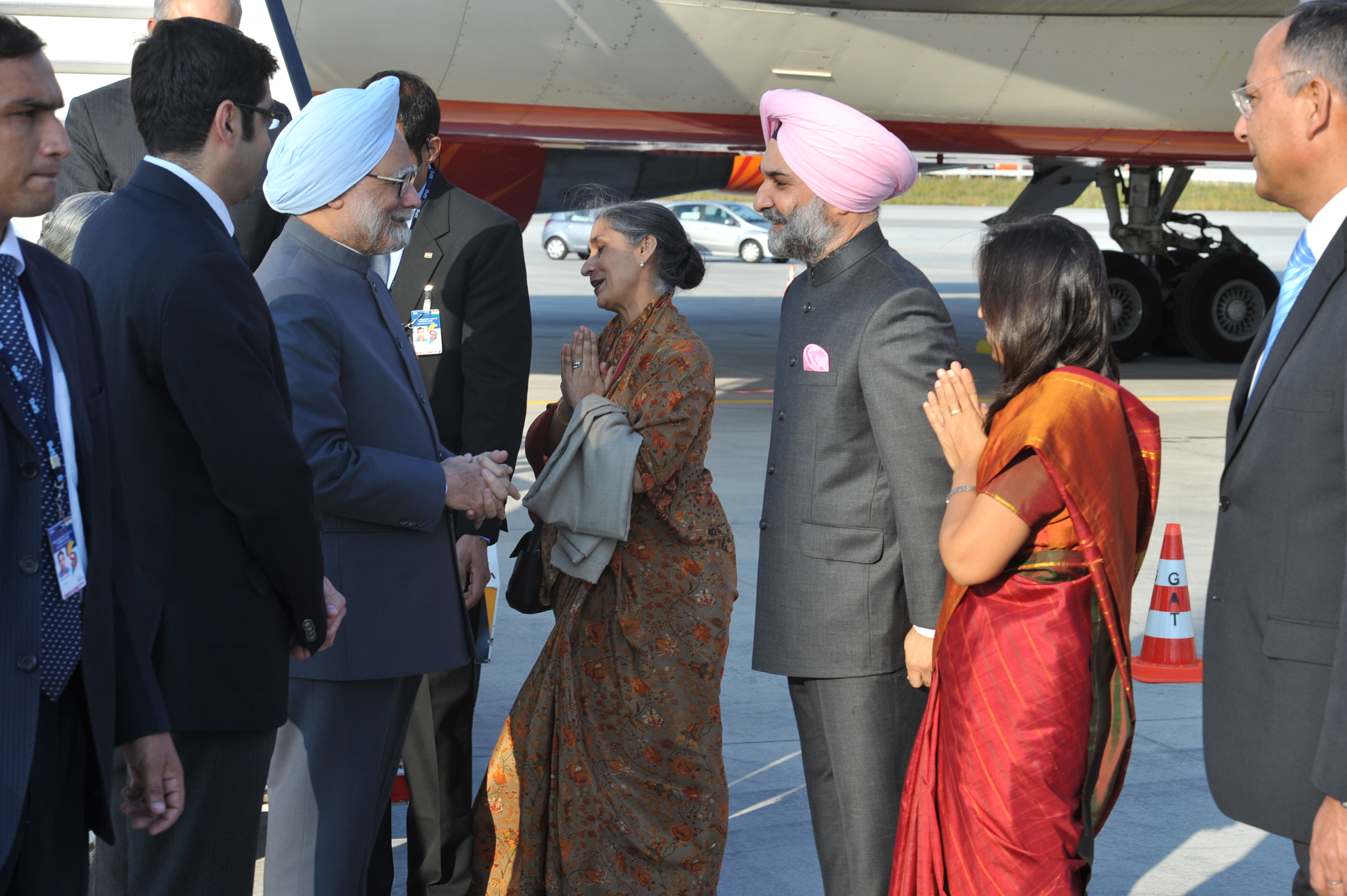
Manmohan Singh being received by the Consul General of India in Frankfurt, Shri Taranjit Singh Sandhu, at the Frankfurt International Airport

From September 2011 to July 2013, Sandhu served as the Consul General of India in Frankfurt, Germany. In this role, he was responsible for strengthening India’s economic, commercial, and cultural engagement with the region, specially given the fact that Frankfurt is the Financial Capital of Germany, while also overseeing consular services for the Indian community and businesses in Germany.

=== Deputy Chief of Mission in Washington D.C. ===
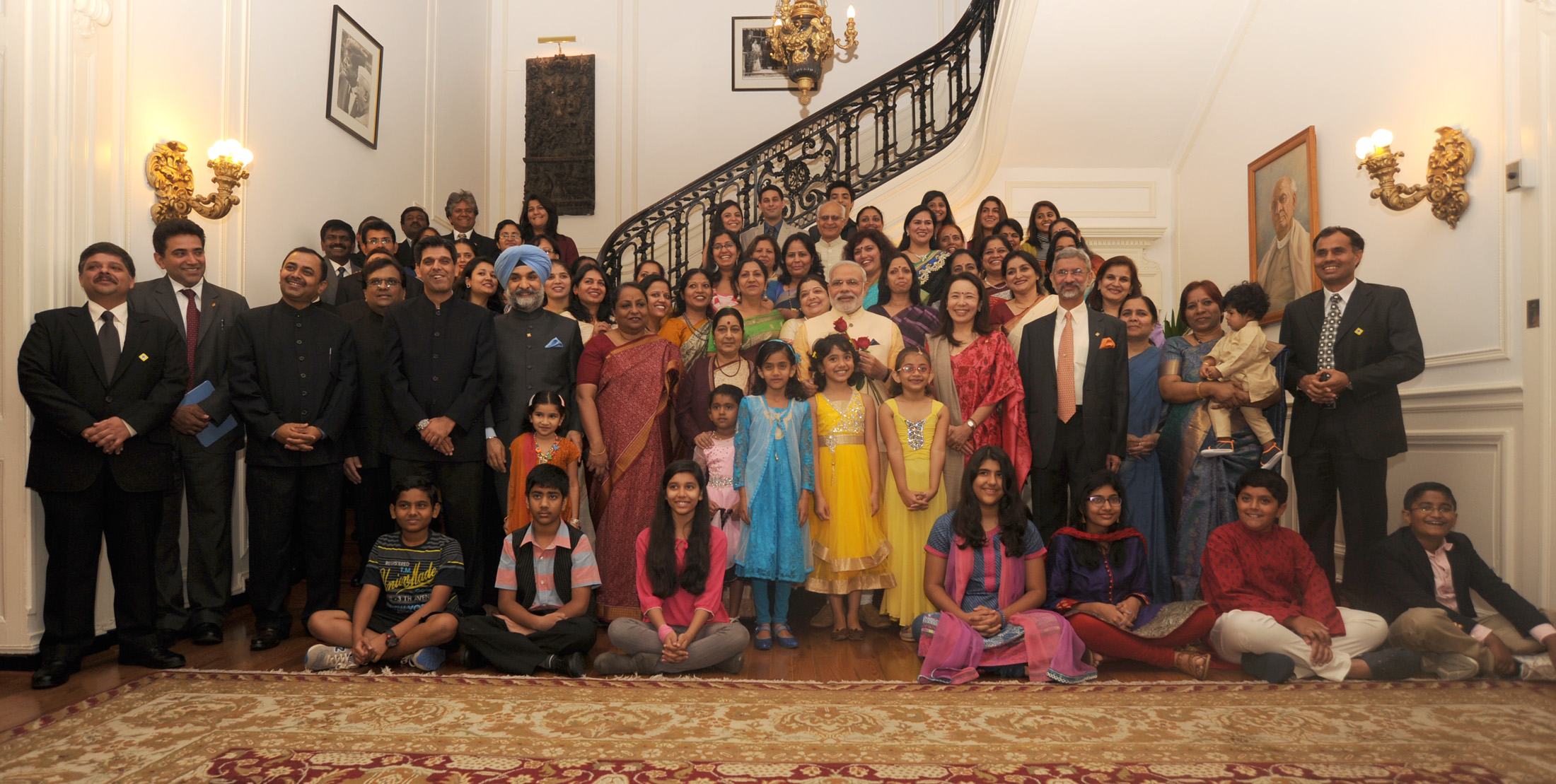
PM Narendra Modi with the Embassy officials including then Ambassadaor of India to USA S. Jaishankar and their families at Indian Embassy in USA, at Washington DC on 30 September 2014. Sandhu is standing to the right of the Foreign Secretary Sujatha Singh who is standing right to the External Affairs Minister Smt. Sushma Swaraj

From July 2013 to January 2017, Sandhu served as the Deputy Chief of Mission at the Embassy of India in Washington, D.C., United States. As the second-senior most diplomat at the mission, he played a key role in advancing the India–United States strategic partnership and coordinating high-level diplomatic engagement between the two countries. During this period, he worked closely with senior officials in both governments and contributed to preparations for high-level visits, including Narendra Modi’s first ever visit to the United States of America and to the United Nations in 2014, during the visit the Modi meet with President Barack Obama. His tenure also involved strengthening political, economic, and strategic cooperation between India and the United States while managing the day-to-day functioning of the embassy.

=== High Commissioner of India to Sri Lanka ===
From January 2017 to January 2020, Sandhu served as the High Commissioner of India in Sri Lanka. In this role, he was responsible for strengthening bilateral relations between India and Sri Lanka, including in areas of trade, security, and regional cooperation. He played a key role in fostering political dialogue between India and Sri Lanka due to the BRI initiative of the Chinese government and supporting developmental and cultural initiatives, while also overseeing the operations of the High Commission and engaging with the Indian diaspora specially Tamils in Sri Lanka.

=== Ambassador of India to the United States ===
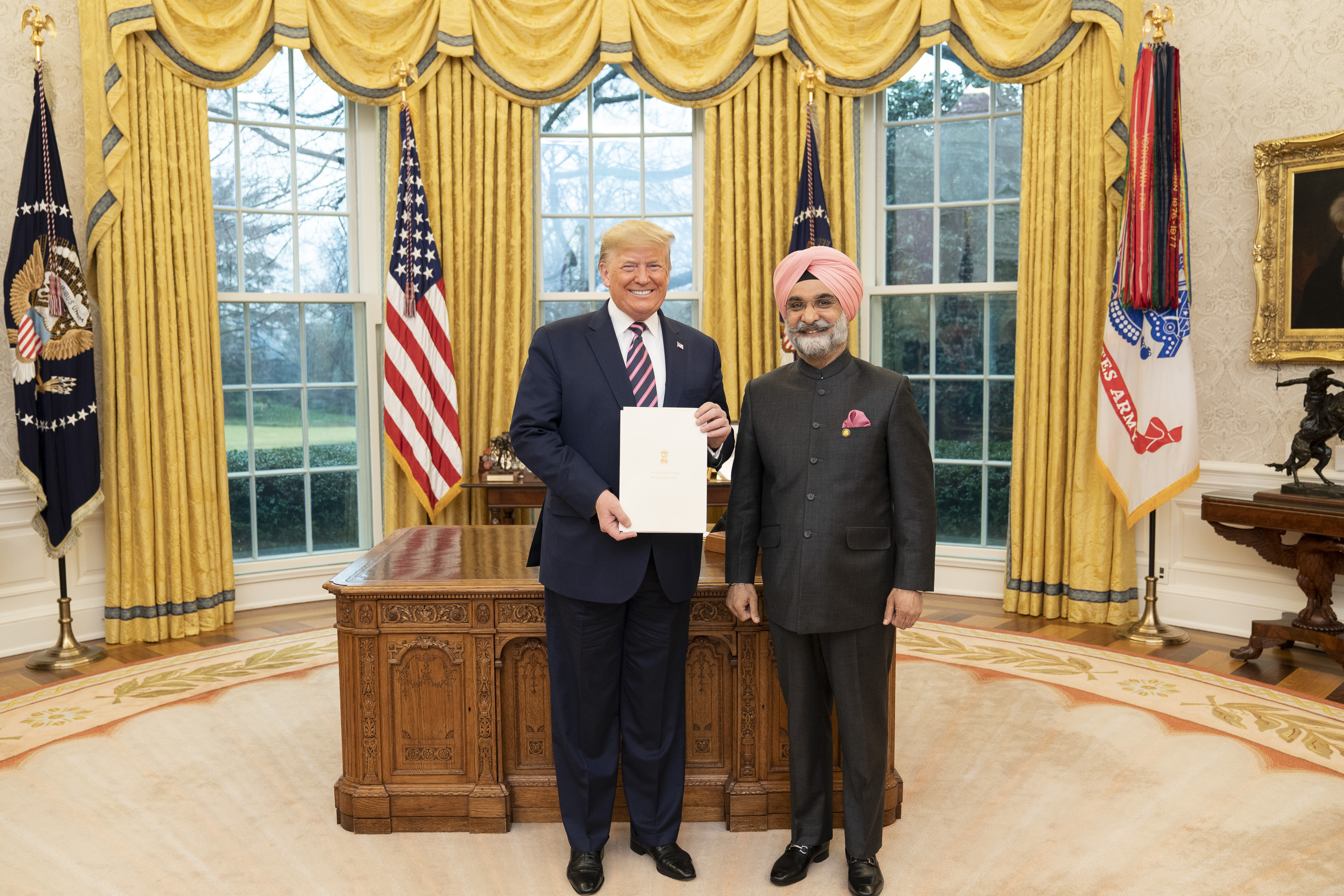
Ambassador Taranjit Singh Sandhu presenting credentials to President Donald Trump in the Oval Office

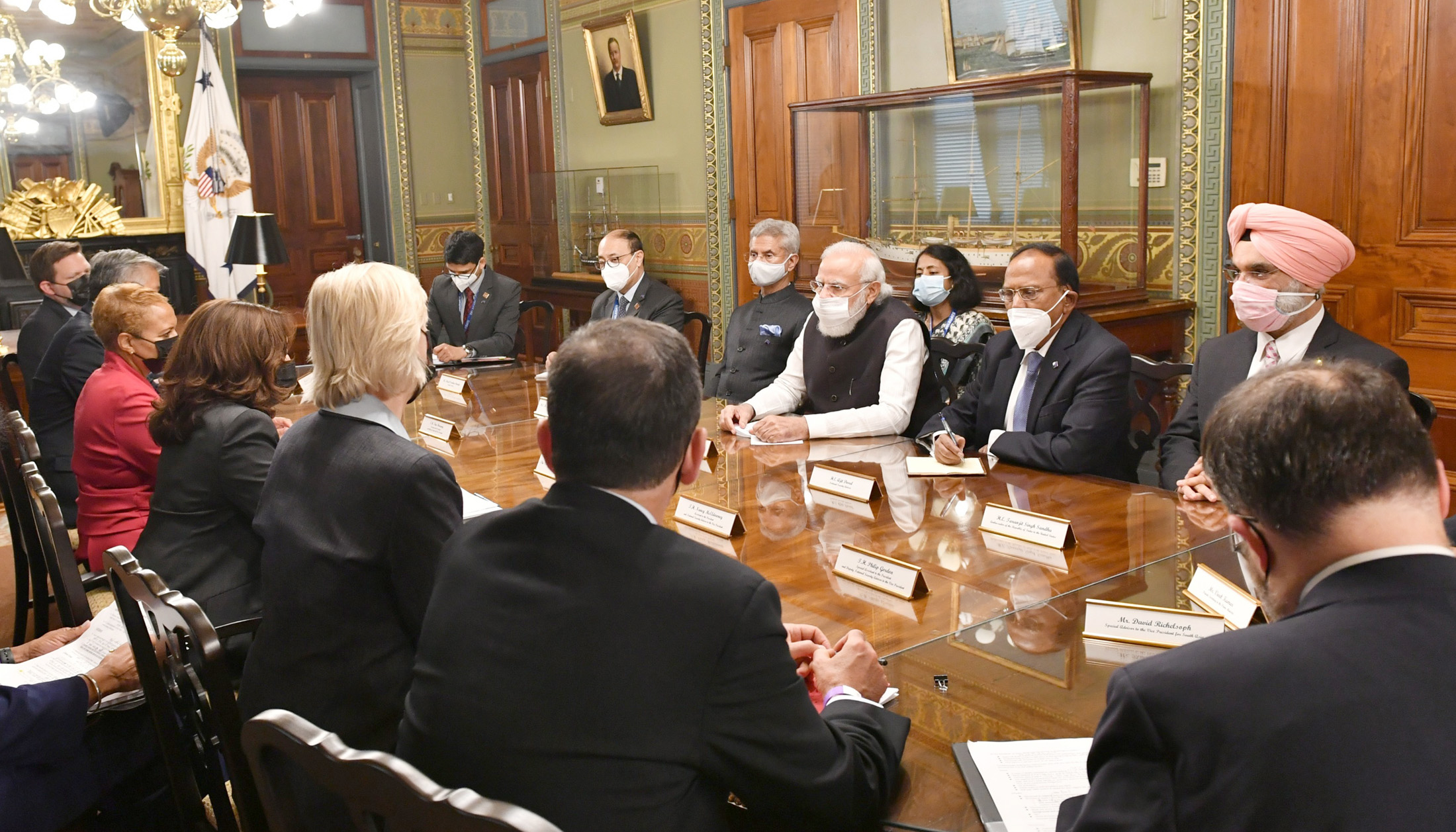
Prime Minister Narendra Modi, External Affairs Minister S. Jaishankar, NSA Ajit Doval, Foreign Secretary Harsh Vardhan Shringla and Ambassador Taranjit Singh Sandhu in a bilateral meeting with US Vice-President Kamala Harris in Washington, D.C. on September 23, 2021

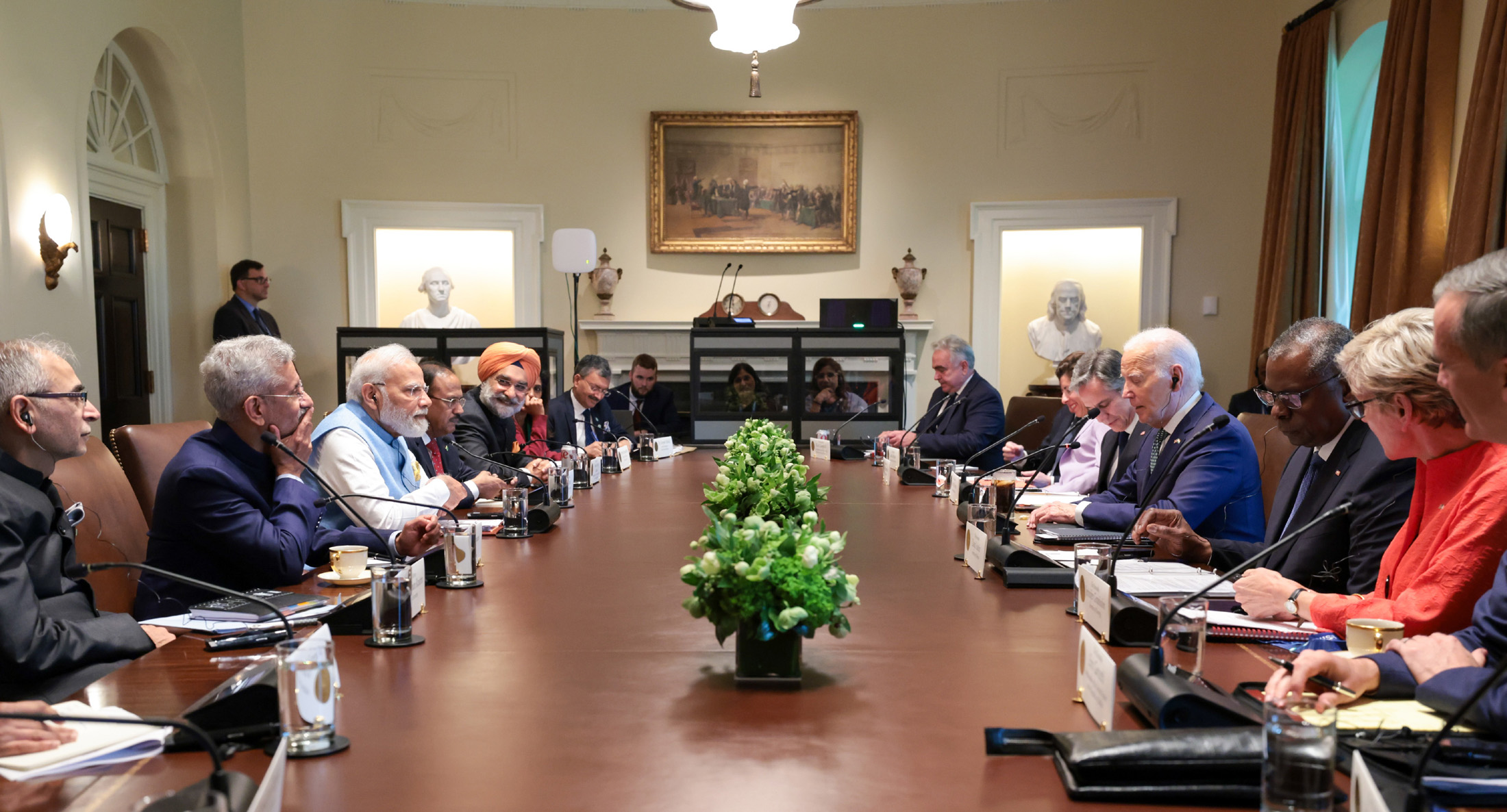
Prime Minister Narendra Modi, NSA Ajit Doval, External Affairs Minister S. Jaishankar, Foreign Secretary Vinay Mohan Kwatra and Ambassador Taranjit Singh Sandhu with US President Joe Biden at the Expanded Bilateral Meeting, White House, Washington, D.C. on June 22, 2023

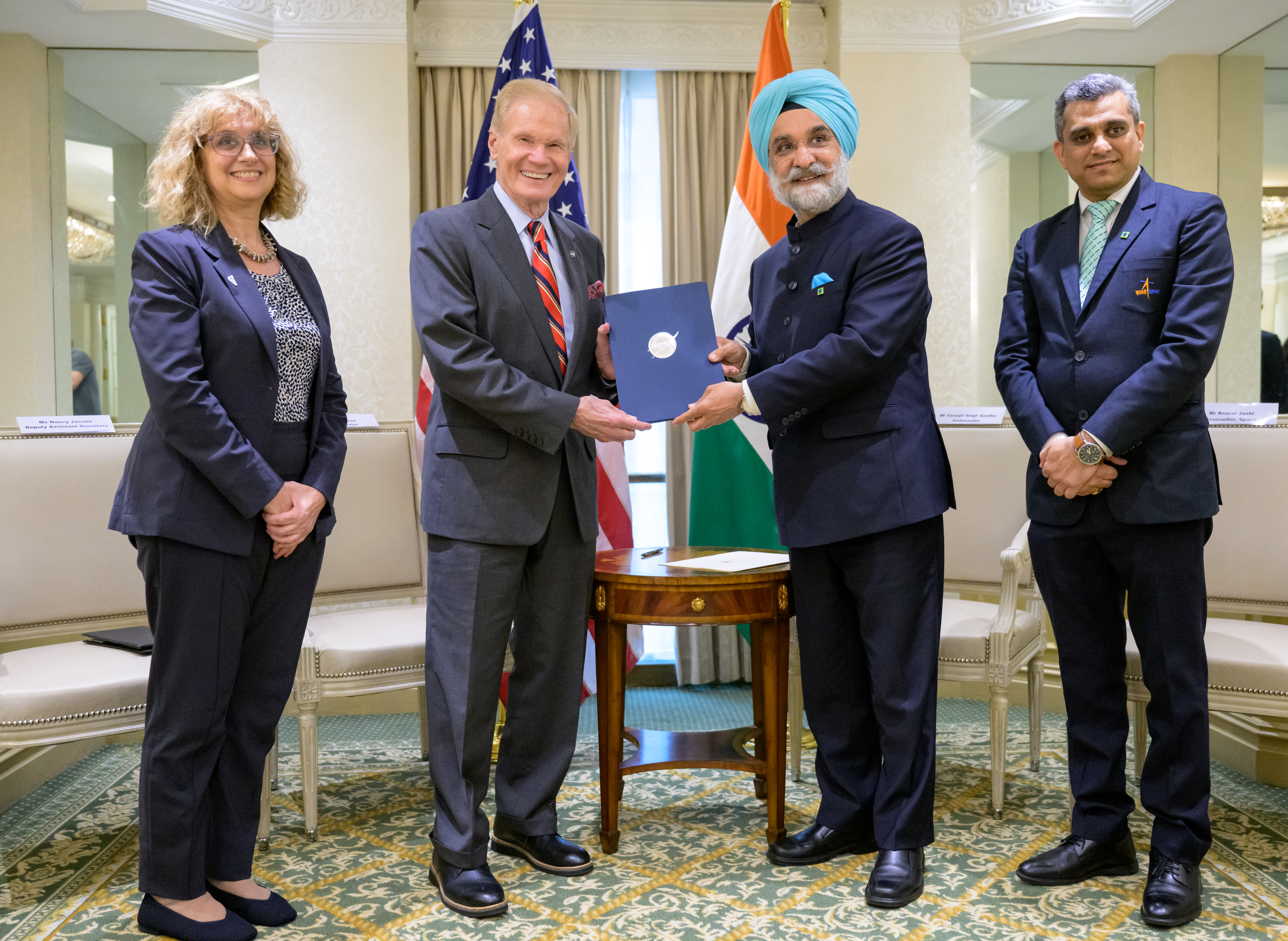
NASA Administrator Bill Nelson and Indian Ambassador Taranjit Sandhu holding the signed Artemis Accords

Sandhu presented his credentials to President Donald Trump in early February 2020 and served as the Ambassador of India to the United States until 31 January 2024. In 2022, he was widely regarded as a potential candidate for the position of Foreign Secretary of India, though Vinay Mohan Kwatra ultimately assumed the role. Subsequently, Sandhu received a two-year extension as Ambassador to the United States.

During his tenure, India signed the Artemis Accords, representing a notable advancement in its engagement with international space governance and lunar initiatives.

Amid the Russia-Ukraine conflict, he oversaw India’s diplomatic stance reflecting the principles of Neutrality and balanced engagement with both the Western countries and Russia, in coordination with Pavan Kapoor, then Ambassador of India to Russia.

In the aftermath of the death of Hardeep Singh Nijjar in Canada, Sandhu navigated criticisms and security concerns raised by elements of the Khalistani activist in the United States. Certain individuals, including Gurpatwant Singh Pannun, who is a terrorist, mentioned in the NIA Most Wanted list, issued threats directed toward the Ambassador and Embassy personnel, which were addressed in accordance with established diplomatic protocols.

One of the notable achievements during his tenure was facilitating the agreement for Joe Biden to approve the participation of Shubhanshu Shukla, an Indian astronaut, in the Axiom 4 mission to the International Space Station. This marked the first planned visit of an Indian astronaut to the ISS, reflecting strengthened bilateral cooperation in space exploration.

== Political career ==
He was the Bharatiya Janata Party candidate for the Lok Sabha constituency of Amritsar in the 2024 Indian general election.

=== Indian Delegation to the US ===
Following the Pahalgam terror attack in Jammu and Kashmir, the Government of India constituted an all-party delegation to engage with international stakeholders and present India’s perspective on the incident. The delegation, led by Shashi Tharoor of the Indian National Congress, included representatives from multiple parties: Bhubaneswar Kalita (Bharatiya Janata Party), Milind Murli Deora (Shiv Sena), Shashank Mani Tripathi (Bharatiya Janata Party), Ganti Harish Madhur (Telugu Desam Party), and former Ambassador of India to the United States Taranjit Singh Sandhu. In his capacity as a senior diplomat, Sandhu played a key role in coordinating the delegation’s engagement in the United States, facilitating high-level discussions with policymakers, articulating India’s response to the terror attack, and advocating measures to counter terror financing and Pakistan-sponsored terrorism, consistent with international diplomatic norms.

=== Lieutenant Governor of Delhi ===
On the evening of 5 March 2026, he was appointed as the Lieutenant Governor of Delhi. This appointment occurred shortly before the 2026 West Bengal Legislative Assembly election, following the resignation of C. V. Ananda Bose from the Governorship of West Bengal. On the same day, the central government concurrently appointed Sandhu and R. N. Ravi to the gubernatorial offices of their respective states, reflecting a strategic administrative realignment of key constitutional positions.

== Personal life ==
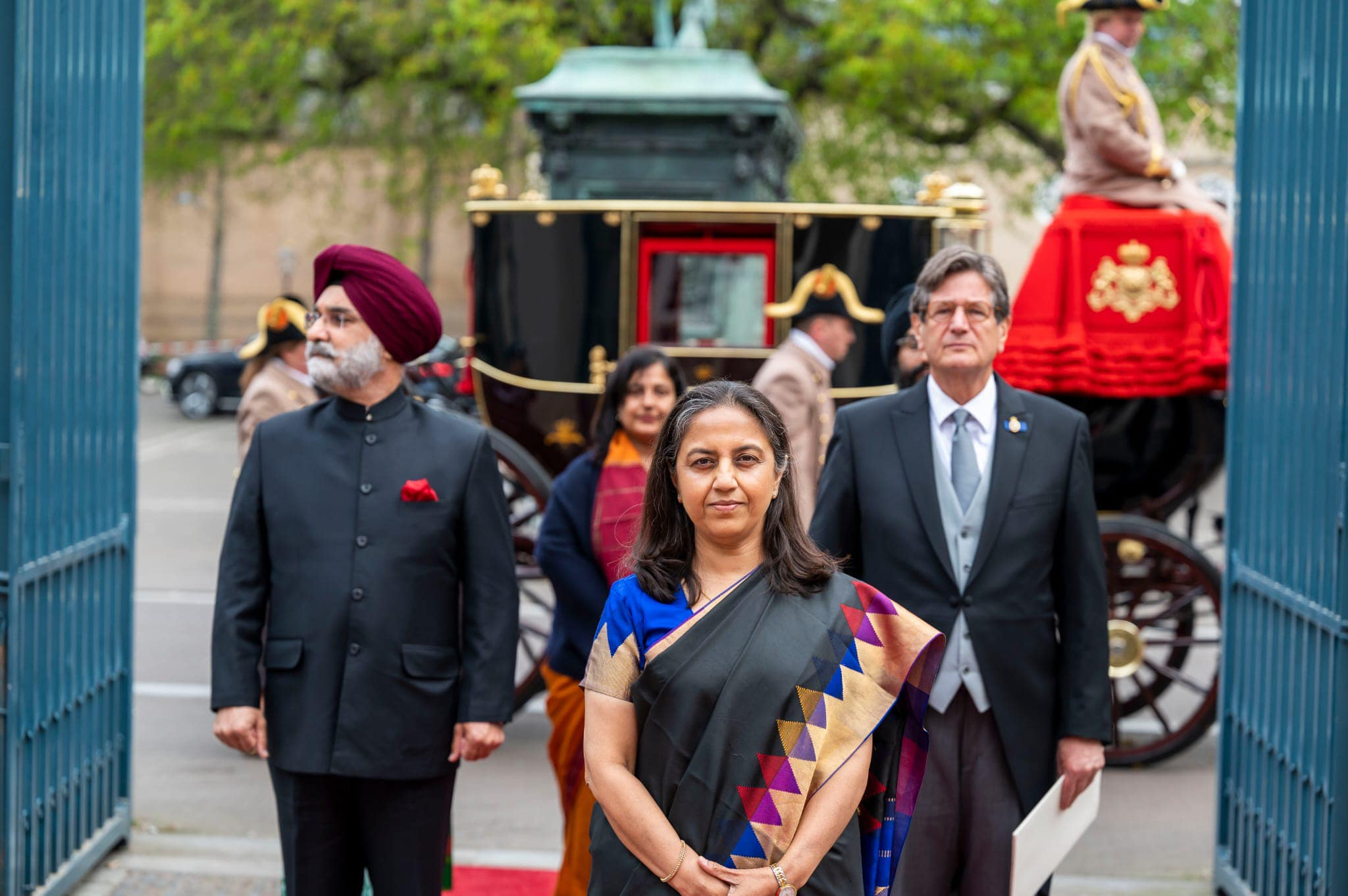
Ambassador Mrs. Reenat Sandhu presented her credentials to HM King Willem-Alexander in a ceremony at Noordeinde Palace, The Hague on 30 March 2022

Ambassador Sandhu is married to Reenat Sandhu, a retired Indian ambassador to Italy and to The Netherlands. They have two children, a son and a daughter. His interests include books, movies and outdoor sports. He speaks Hindi, English, Punjabi.

== See also ==
- Subrahmanyam Jaishankar
- Navtej Sarna
- Vinay Mohan Kwatra
- R. N. Ravi

Diplomatic posts
Preceded by Yashvardhan Kumar Sinha	High Commissioner of India to Sri Lanka; 2017–2020	Succeeded by Gopal Bagalay
Preceded by Harsh Vardhan Shringla	Ambassador of India to the United States; 2020–2024	Succeeded by Vinay Mohan Kwatra
Government offices
Preceded by Vinai Kumar Saxena	Lieutenant Governor of Delhi; 2026–present	Incumbent
