= Pītāmbara =

Yellow garments in Hindu iconography

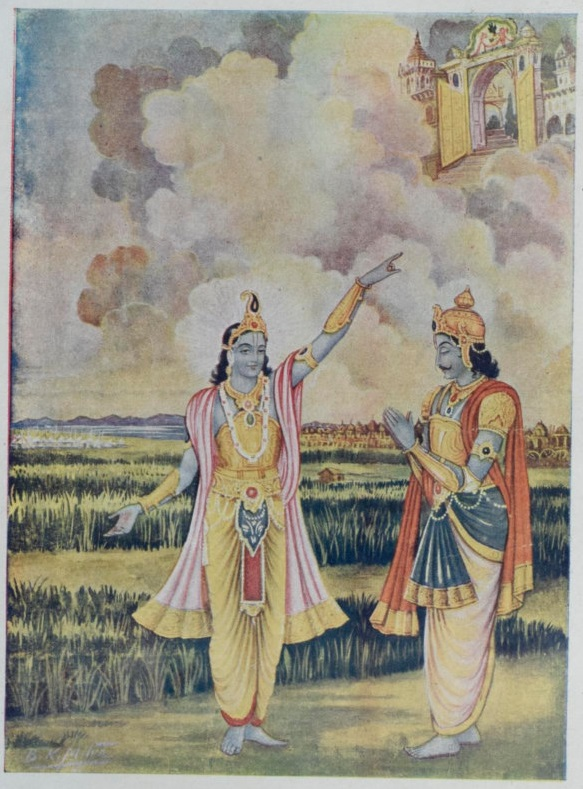
Krishna (left) wearing yellow garments, with Arjuna (right).

Pītāmbara (Sanskrit: पीताम्बर) is a term in Hindu iconography, meaning "yellow garment or shawl", also translated as "clothed in yellow garments", and "name of Vishnu-Krishna". It is primarily depicted on the deity Vishnu and his incarnations, regarded to represent the Vedas.

== Description ==
In Hinduism, the pītāmbara is regarded to represent a yajna or sacrifice, and is referred to as a garment of Purusha and the Vedic metre.

In the Puranas, pītāmbara means "yellow cloth", and is used to describe Vishnu.

In Vaishnavism and Shaivism, the pītāmbara is the "yellow dhoti" or "bright golden-yellow garment" described as the garment of Vishnu or Krishna.

== Sources ==
- Dowson, John: A Classical Dictionary of Hindu Mythology and Religion – Geography, History and Religion; D.K.Printworld Ltd., New Delhi, India, 2005
