= Thiruvaduthurai Adheenam =

One of 18 adheenam, saivite mutt

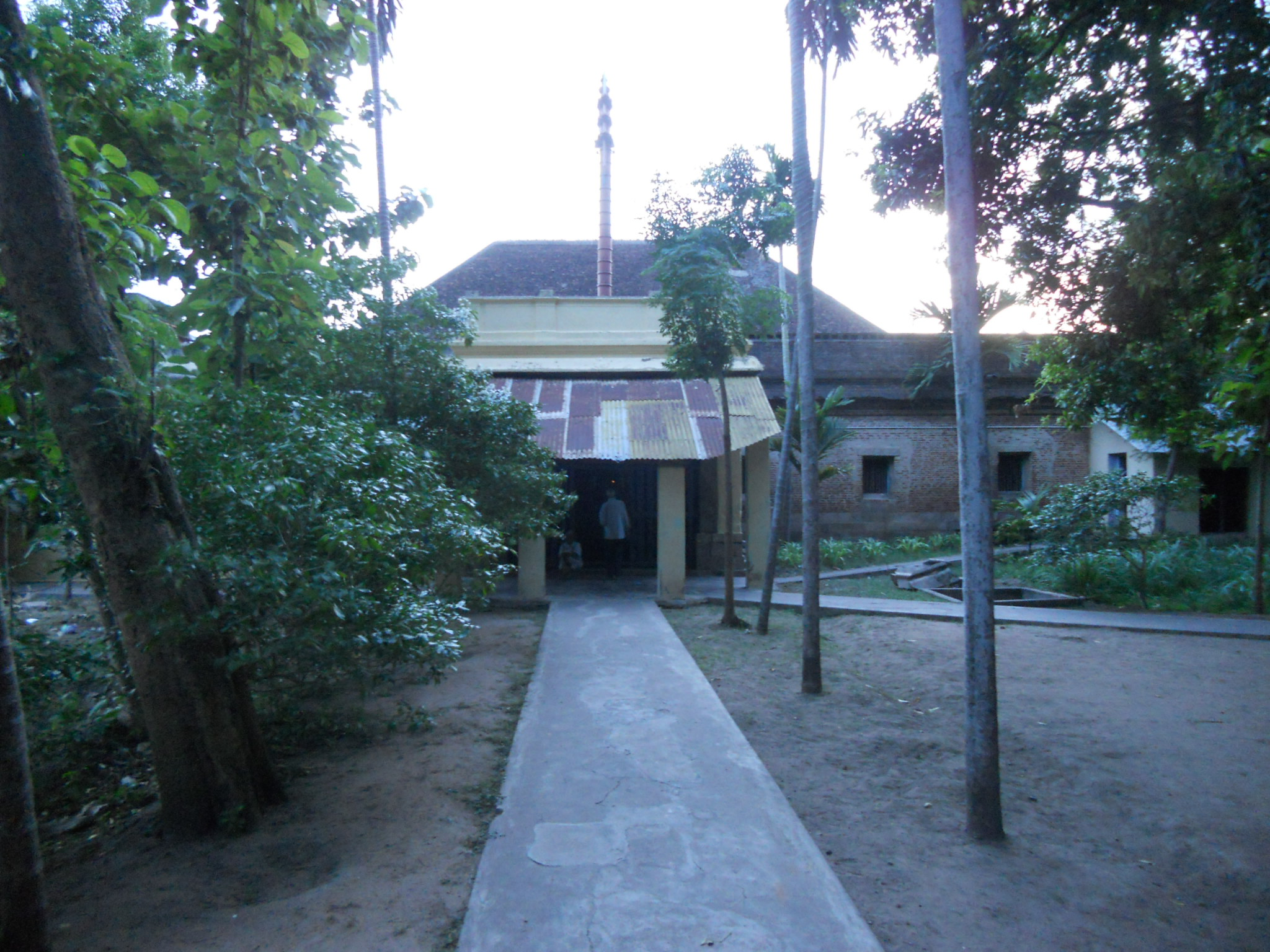
View of the Adheenam

Thiruvavaduthurai Adheenam is a Saivite mutt based in the town of Thiruvavaduthurai in Kuthalam taluk of Mayiladuthurai District, Tamil Nadu, India. The adheenam maintains the Mayuranathaswami temple at Mayiladuthurai. As of 1987, there were a total of 15 Shiva temples under the control of the adheenam.

== Key activities ==
The Adheenam is involved in publishing Saivite literature, specifically Thevaram and Tiruvasakam and its translations. It is also involved in literary scholarship. Some of the prominent Tamil literary personalities like Meenakshi Sundaram Pillai had their tutorship in the Adheenam. His disciple U V Swaminatha Iyer, who published many Tamil classical texts also was associated with the organization. The Adheenam along with Thiruppanandal Adheenam and Dharmapuram Adheenam were founded during the 16th century to spread the ideology of Saiva Sidhantam.

== Notable events ==
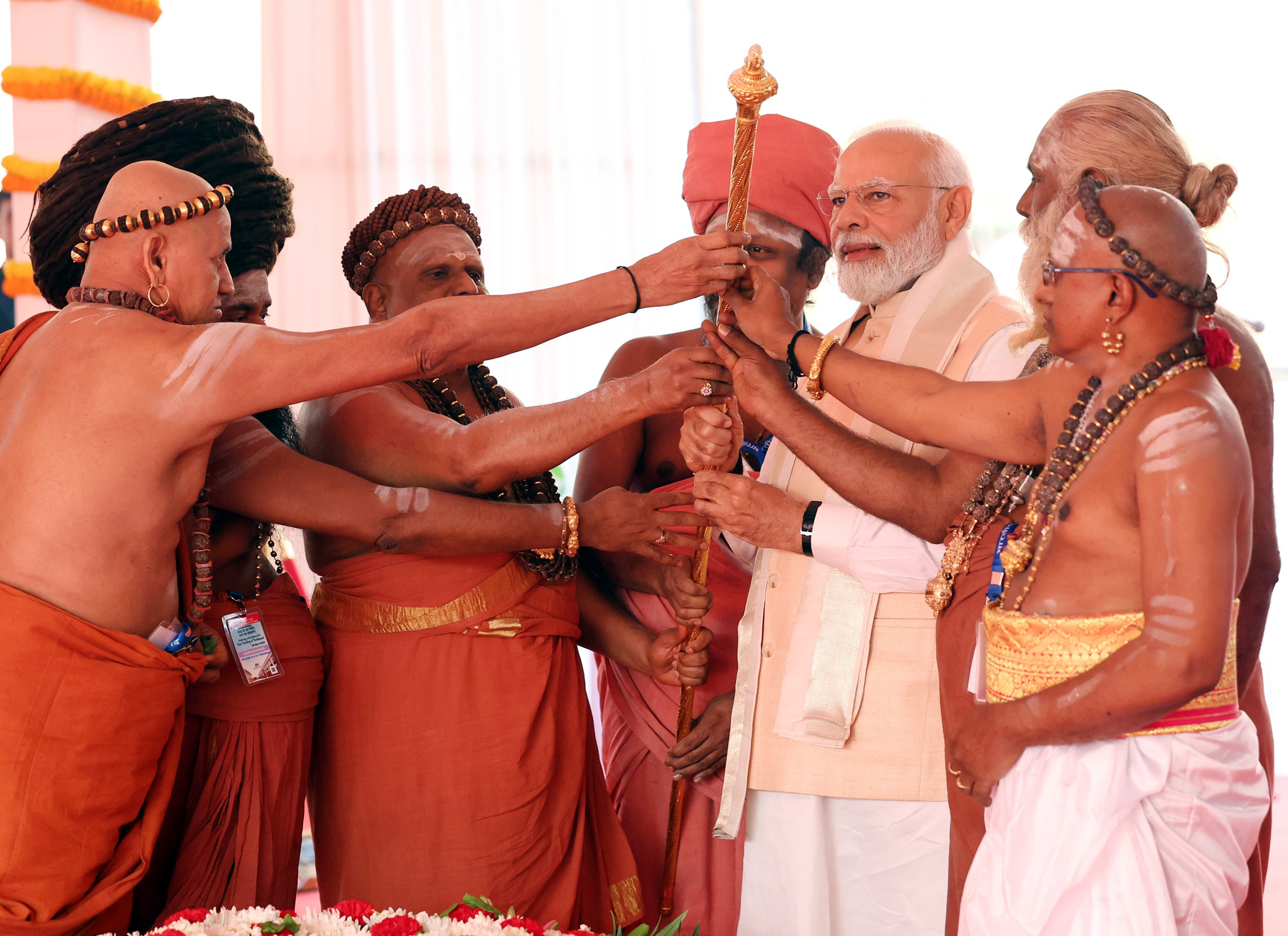
PM Modi receiving 'Sengol' from Adheenam priests in 2023

In connection with India's Independence on August 14, 1947, two emissaries from the Adheenam presented Jawaharlal Nehru, a golden sceptre, referred to as "Sengol", at his home in Delhi in an elaborate ceremony. Sengol, which is derived from Tamil word ‘semmai’, meaning righteousness, had an important place in Tamil culture; as when a new king was crowned, he would be presented with a ‘sengol’ during the coronation by the high priest and be reminded that he had the “aanai” (order or decree) to rule justly and fairly. C. Rajagopalachari, who was also an ardent follower of this Adheenam, is often credited with the idea of the 1947 Sengol ceremony as a mark of the transfer of power from the British to the Indian rulers.

On May 28, 2023, at the beginning of the inauguration of the new parliament, the Adheenam priests performed a traditional puja in which Prime Minister Narendra Modi participated, and Modi bowed down before the sacred Sengol as a mark of respect. Then a group of Adheenam priests presented the Sengol to PM Modi, who installed it near the chair of the Speaker of the Lok Sabha in the new Parliament building.

== See also ==
- Sengol
