= P. N. Menon (diplomat) =

Indian diplomat (1920–1975)

Parappil-Narayana Menon (1920- 22 June 1975), also known as P.N. Menon, was a career diplomat in the Indian Foreign Service. Like his father-in-law, he undertook an overland journey to Lhasa in 1956, on foot and on horseback through the formidable Nathula Pass, to take up his post as India's Consult-General in Tibet.

== Personal life ==
He was married to Malini, the daughter of first Foreign Secretary of India, K.P.S. Menon. His son is Shivshankar Menon, who as of 2011 was the National Security Advisor to the Prime Minister of India.

== Civil service ==
P.N. Menon first joined the Indian Foreign Service in 1947. At one point, he served as Consul-General of India in Lhasa, and later served as intermediary to the young Dalai Lama during the 1959 Tibetan uprising. He died while serving as ambassador to Greece and Yugoslavia in Belgrade.

=== Posts held ===
- War Service Officer, 1947
- Consul-General of India, Lhasa, October 1954-November 1956
- First Secretary, Indian Embassy, Rome, April 1957-May 1958
- Consul-General of India, Damascus, June 1958-February 1959
- Director (External Publicity), MEA, 1959–62
- Consul-General, San Francisco, 1962–65
- Ambassador to Cambodia, 1965–68
- Joint Secretary, Additional Secretary and Secretary, MEA, 1968–72
- Ambassador to Yugoslavia and Greece -1975
