= List of ambassadors of India to Germany =

Ambassador of India to Germany
- Incumbent; Ajit Gupte since October 7th 2024
- Type: Ambassador
- Member of: Indian Foreign Service
- Reports to: Ministry of External Affairs
- Appointer: President of India
- Term length: No fixed tenure
- Formation: 1952
- First holder: Subimal Dutt
- Deputy: Deputy Chief of Mission
- Website: Indian Ambassadors to the Federal Republic of Germany

The Ambassador of India to Germany is the chief diplomatic representative of India to Germany. The embassy is located in Tiergartenstraße 17, 10785 Berlin.

The embassy is headed by the Ambassador, while three other consulates located in Frankfurt, Hamburg and Munich are headed by a Consulate general.

The following people have served as Ambassadors to the Federal Republic of Germany.

== List of Indian Ambassadors to the Federal Republic of Germany ==
Name	Entered office	Left office
Subimal Dutt	1952	1954
A. C. N. Nambiar	1955	1958
Badruddin Tayyabji, ICS	1958	1960
P. Achutha Menon	1960	1964
S K. Banerjee	1964	1967
Khub Chand	1967	1970
Kewal Singh	1970	1972
Y. K. Puri	1973	1975
M. A. Rahman	1975	1980
A. M. Khusro	1980	1982
R. D. Sathe	1982	1984
D. S. Kamtekar	1984	1986
J. C. Ajmani	1987	1988
A. Madhavan	1988	1991
Kishan S. Rana	1992	1995
S.K. Lambah	1995	1998
Ronen Sen	1998	2002
T.C.A. Rangachari	2002	2005
Meera Shankar	2005	2009
Sudhir Vyas	2009	2011
Sujatha Singh	2012	2013
Vijay Keshav Gokhale	2013	2016
Gurjit Singh	2016	2017
Mukta Dutta Tomar	2017	2021
Parvathaneni Harish	2021	2024
Ajit Gupte	2024	

== See also ==
- Embassy of India, Berlin
