= Institute of All Nations for Advanced Studies =

The Institute of All Nations for Advanced Studies, Inc. (IAN) was established by Dr. Rama C. Mohanty and others in 1964. Mohanty, IAN's General Secretary, is a professor of physics at Southern University in Baton Rouge, Louisiana, United States. He moved to found the organization after being deeply affected by the brutal murder of thousands of innocent people, including children and women, as a result of religious and communal rioting in his native India.

Convinced that the promotion of inner peace within each individual is vital to the establishment of meaningful world peace, IAN seeks to become:

- A non-political, non-partisan, non-sectarian society
- A community of scholars and humanitarians dedicated to peace
- An institution devoted to the humanization, re-education of mankind and the development of international law
- An organization of people as well as governments
- A true parliament of humanity, serving as a forum for all men and women of goodwill everywhere

Permanently chartered as a private, nonprofit educational 501(c)(3) tax-exempt corporation in New York, the Institute began under the co-chairmanship of former Supreme Court of the United States Justice Arthur (Joseph) Goldberg, and former United Nations Ambassador Arthur S. Lall's niece, Dr. Anurita Kapur, M.D., a neurosurgeon in New York. Since 1998, IAM has promoted World Peace Day internationally on 1 October to raise mass awareness against violence at home and abroad as well as to honor those working to promote peace.
