= Permanent Mission of India to the United Nations =

Permanent mission of India to the UN

Coordinates: 40°45′3″N 73°58′20″W

Permanent Mission of India to the United Nations, New York
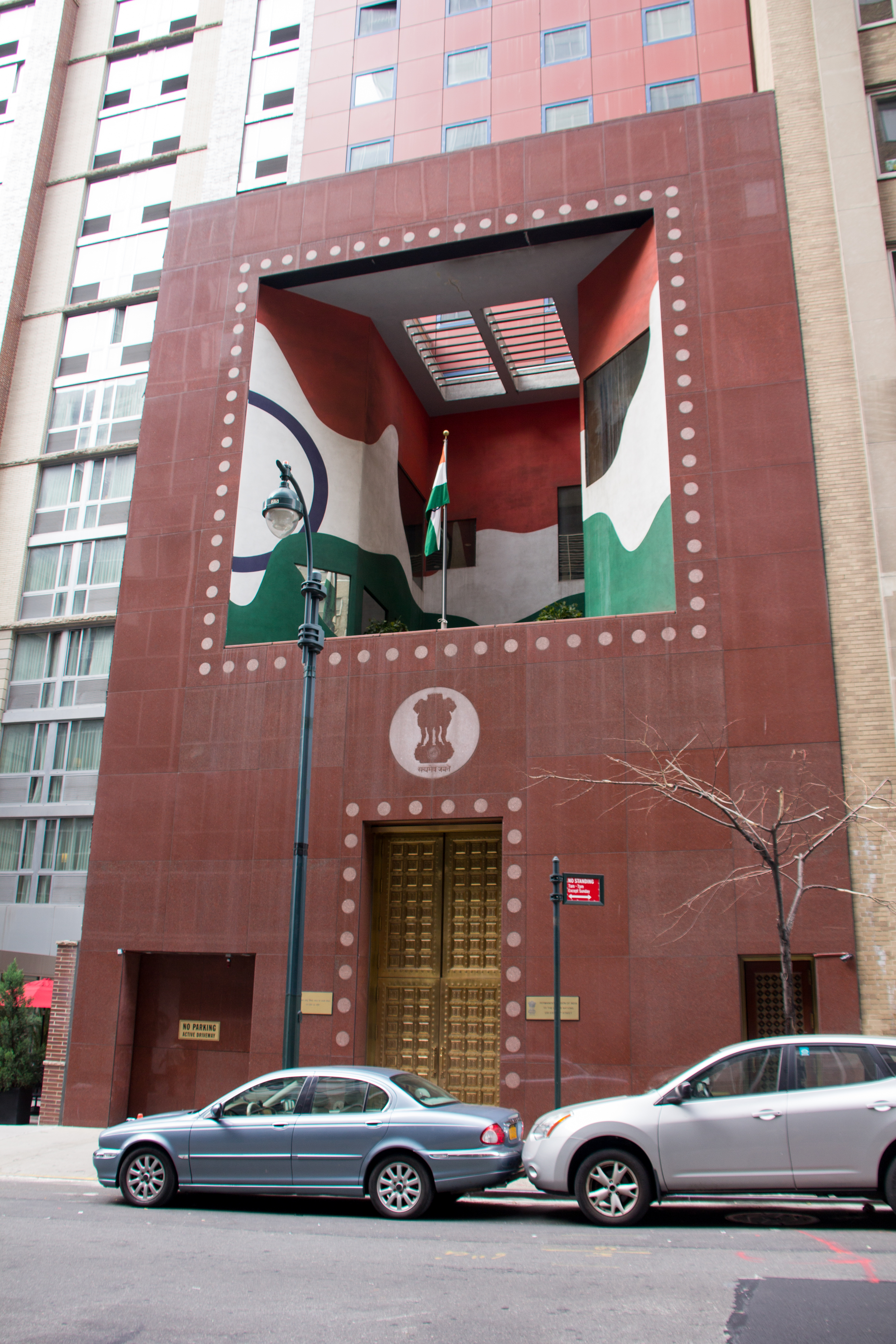
- Location: New York City, United States
- Address: 235 E. 43rd St., New York, 10017
- Opened: 1946; 80 years ago
- Permanent representative: Parvathaneni Harish
- Deputy Permanent Representative: R. Ravindra
- Website: Official website

The Permanent Mission of India to the United Nations is the formal title of the Indian delegation to the United Nations (UN). India was among the founding members of the United Nations and signed the Declaration by United Nations on 1 January 1942. India also participated in the United Nations Conference on International Organization and Diwan Bahadur Sir Arcot Ramasamy Mudaliar signed the United Nations Charter on India's behalf.

== Leadership ==
The Permanent Representative of India to the United Nations is the leader of the Indian Mission to the United Nations. They also represent India in the Security Council of the United Nations. The current Permanent Representative of India to the United Nations is Harish Parvathaneni.

In 2020, when India was elected to become a non-permanent member of United Nations Security Council for the term 2021-2022, the Ministry of External Affairs (MEA) appointed four more foreign service officers to serve in the Permanent Mission in New York to boost diplomatic presence. An officer was appointed as Deputy Permanent Representative specially to look after Security Council issues. In addition, few Counsellors and First Secretaries were posted to the Mission to look after Security Council issues.

Currently, the Ambassador/Permanent Representative leads the Mission. In addition, the mission has a Deputy Permanent Representative who has the rank of Ambassador, a Minister, seven Counsellors, a Legal Advisor, two First Secretaries, three Second Secretaries and a Military Advisor.

== Mission building ==
The Indian Permanent Mission to the United Nations is housed at 235 East 43rd Street, between 2nd and 3rd Avenues, in Turtle Bay, Manhattan, New York City. It is a 27-storied red granite-clad building, built in 1993. It was designed by Indian architect Charles Correa.

== See also ==
- India and the United Nations
- Foreign relations of India
- List of diplomatic missions of India
- List of current permanent representatives to the United Nations
