= India and the United Nations =

Republic of India

United Nations membership
- Represented by: British Raj (1945–1947); Union of India (1947–1950); Republic of India (1950–present)
- Membership: Full member
- Since: 30 October 1945
- UNSC seat: Non-permanent (G4 member)
- Permanent Representative: Parvathaneni Harish

India was among the charter members of the United Nations that signed the Declaration by United Nations at Washington, D.C., on 1 January 1942 (as British India) and also participated in the United Nations Conference on International Organization at San Francisco from 25 April to 26 June 1945. As a founding member of the United Nations, India strongly supports the purposes and principles of the UN and has made significant contributions in implementing the goals of the Charter, and the evolution of the UN's specialised programmes and agencies. In 1947, the United Nations Information Centre (UNIC) in New Delhi became the first United Nations office in independent India.

India has been a non-permanent member of the UN Security Council for eight terms (a total of ongoing 16 years), with the most recent being the 2021–22 term. India is a member of G4, group of nations who back each other in seeking a permanent seat on the Security Council and advocate in favour of the reformation of the UNSC. India is also part of the G-77.

India is a charter member of the United Nations and participates in all of its specialised agencies and organizations. India has contributed troops to United Nations peacekeeping efforts in Korea, Egypt and the Congo in its earlier years and in Somalia, Angola, Haiti, Liberia, Lebanon and Rwanda in recent years, and more recently in the South Sudan conflict.

== History ==
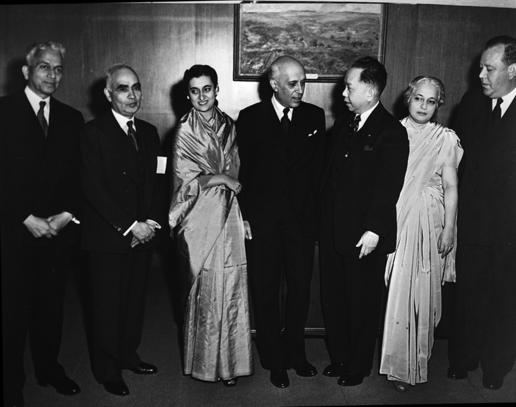
Prime Minister Nehru talks with Carlos P. Romulo, President of the General Assembly, 1949

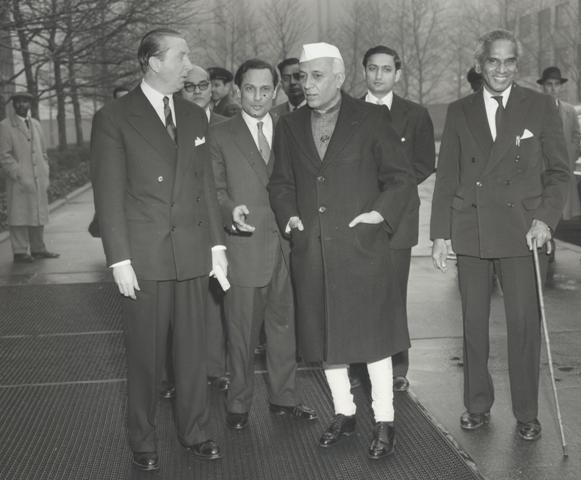
Prime Minister Nehru and V. K. Krishna Menon, chairman of the Indian delegation to the United Nations, 1956

India was one of the original members of the League of Nations. In principle, only sovereign states can become UN members. However, although today all UN members are fully sovereign states, four of the original members (Belarus, India, the Philippines, and Ukraine) were not independent at the time of their admission. India signed the Declaration by United Nations on 1 January 1942 and was represented by Girija Shankar Bajpai who was the Indian Agent-General at the time. Afterwards the Indian delegation led by Sir Arcot Ramaswamy Mudaliar signed the United Nations Charter on behalf of India during the historic United Nations Conference on International Organization held in San Francisco, United States on 26 June 1945. Sir A. Ramaswamy Mudaliar later went on to serve as the first president of the United Nations Economic and Social Council.

India gained full independence in 1947. Independent India viewed its membership at the United Nations as an important guarantee for maintaining international peace and security. India stood at the forefront during the UN's tumultuous years of struggle against colonialism and apartheid. India's status as a founding member of the Non-Aligned Movement and the Group of 77 cemented its position within the UN system as a leading advocate of the concerns and aspirations of developing countries and the creation of a more equitable international economic and political order. India was among the most outspoken critics of apartheid and racial discrimination in South Africa, being the first country to have raised the issue in the UN (in 1946).

== Activities ==
=== UN General Assembly ===
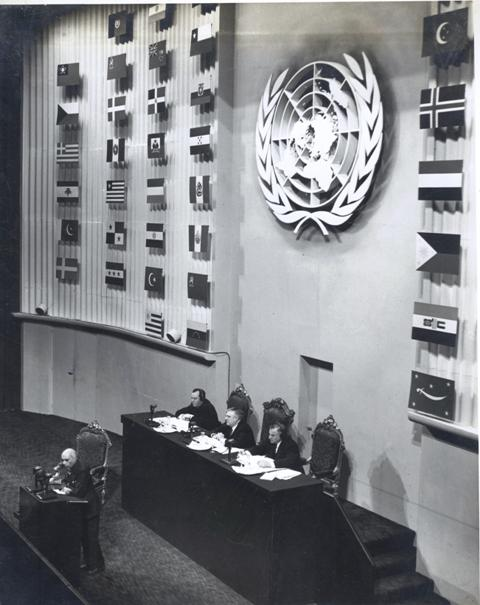
Prime Minister of India Jawaharlal Nehru at the UN General Assembly in 1948.

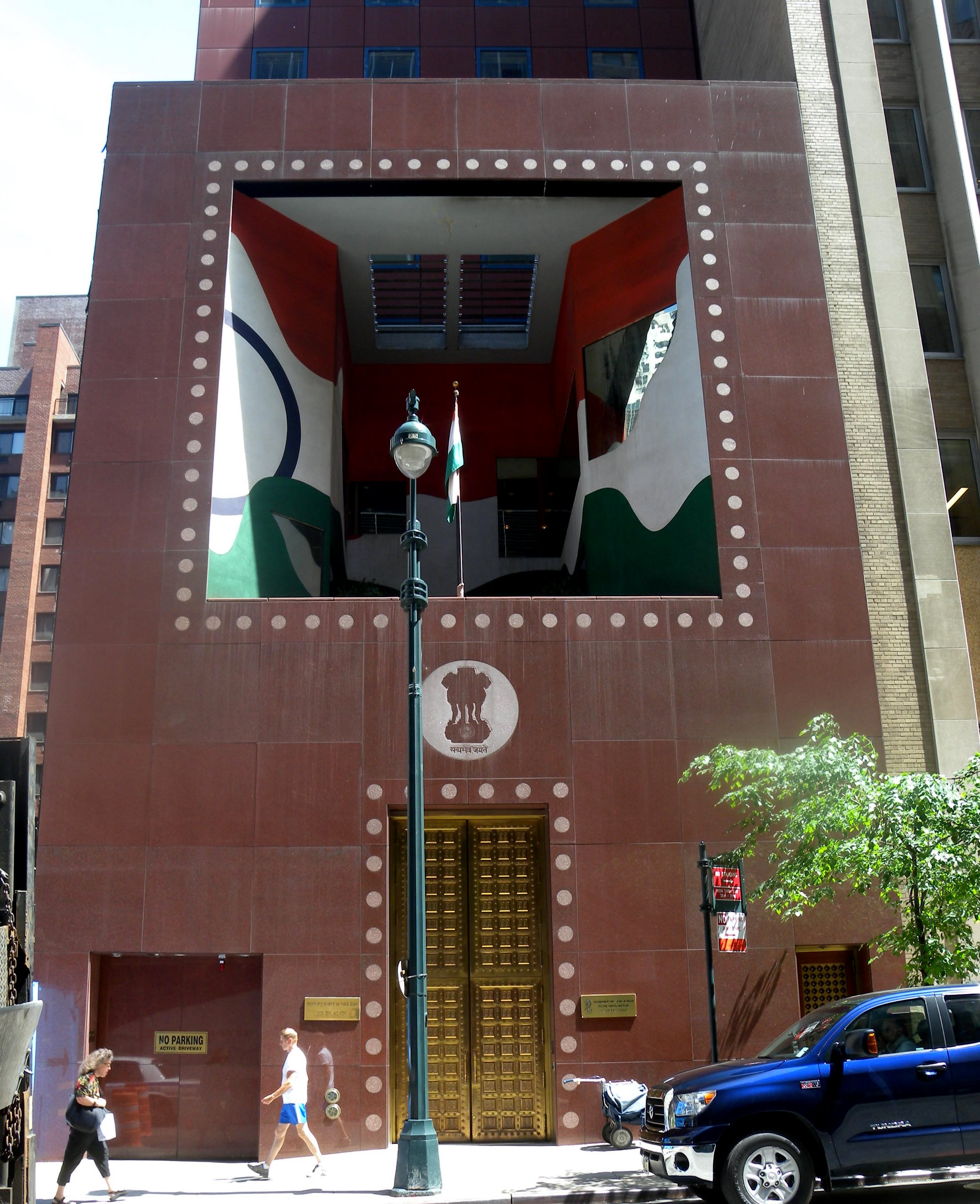
Indian Mission to the UN Headquarters in New York

India was one of the founding members of the United Nations, joining in October 1945, two years before acquiring independence from United Kingdom. By 1946, India had started raising concerns regarding decolonization, apartheid and racial discrimination. From early 1947–48, India took an active part in Drafting of the Universal Declaration of Human Rights. Dr. Hansa Mehta, a Gandhian political activist and social worker who led the Indian delegation, had made important contributions in drafting of the Declaration, especially highlighting the need for reflecting gender equality by changing the language of the Universal Declaration of Human Rights from 'all men are created equal' (Eleanor Roosevelt's preferred phrase) to 'all human beings'.

In 1953, the chief delegate of India at the time, Vijaya Lakshmi Pandit was elected the first woman President of the UN General Assembly. India supported the struggle towards global disarmament and the ending of the arms race, and towards the creation of a more equitable international economic order. India had a mediatory role in resolving the stalemate over prisoners of war in Korea contributing to the signing of the armistice ending the Korean War in 1953. India chaired the five-member Neutral Nations Repatriation Commission while the Indian Custodian Force supervised the process of interviews and repatriation that followed. India then went on to chair the three international commissions for supervision and control for Vietnam, Cambodia, and Laos established by the 1954 Geneva Accords on Indochina. India also had an active role to play in the Suez Crisis in 1956 with the role of Jawaharlal Nehru, both as Prime Minister of India and a leader of the Non-Aligned Movement being significant. Indian historian Inder Malhotra wrote that "Now Nehru—who had tried to be even-handed between the two sides—denounced Anthony Eden and co-sponsors of the aggression vigorous. He had a powerful, if relatively silent, ally in the US president Dwight D. Eisenhower who went to the extent of using America's clout in the IMF to make Eden and Mollet (the then French Prime Minister) behave".

Charter provisions on non-self-governing territories were given a new thrust when the UN adopted the landmark 1960 Declaration on the Granting of Independence to Colonial Countries and Peoples which was co-sponsored by India. The following year, the Special Committee on the Implementation of the Declaration on Decolonization was established to study, investigate and recommend action to bring an end to colonialism, it was chaired by India for the first time. India played a leading role in the formation of a Sub-Committee against Apartheid set up by the General Assembly. When the Convention on Elimination of all forms of Racial Discrimination was adopted in 1965, India was among the earliest signatories, however it does not recognise competence under article 14 and it does not consider itself bound by article 22.

India also played a prominent role in articulating the economic concerns of developing countries in such UN-sponsored conferences as the triennial UN Conference on Trade and Development and the 1992 Conference on the Environment and Development in Rio de Janeiro. It has been an active member of the Group of 77, and later the core group of the G-15 nations. Other issues, such as environmentally sustainable development and the promotion and protection of human rights, have also been an important focus of India's foreign policy in international forums.

=== UN Security Council ===
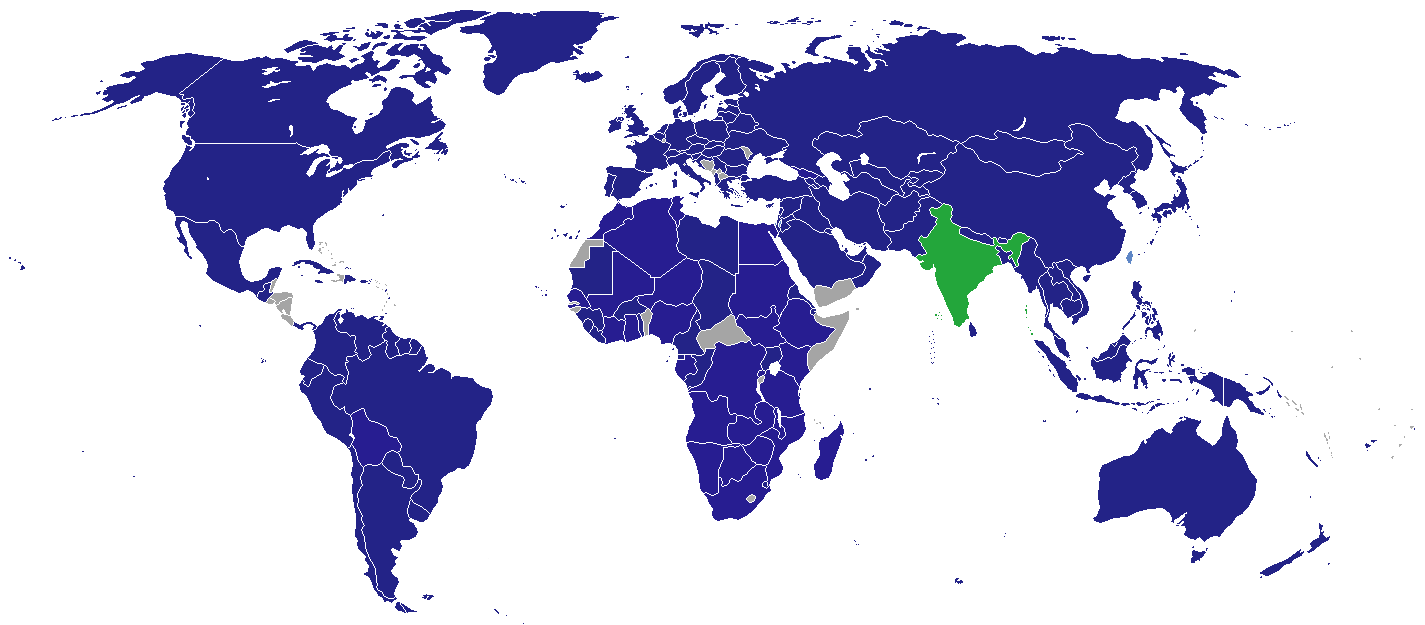
Countries which host an Indian diplomatic mission.

==== Activities during 1947–1962 ====
Despite its anti-status quo stand on many global issues, India's attitude toward the basic structure of the UN was fundamentally conservative. It accepted the organization and distribution of power in the UN, as both a guarantee of Indian sovereignty and as a check on the numerical superiority of the U.S. and its western coalition. India supported the charter provisions for a Security Council veto for the great powers, opposed the U.S. initiative to circumvent the veto through the Uniting for Peace Resolution, dismissed Hammarskjöld's notion of a "UN presence" as interventionist and opposed all efforts to conduct UN directed plebiscites as tests of opinion.

India's procedural conservatism was based both on its commitment to national sovereignty and its desire to protect Indian interests. Its experience with the UN had not always been positive. In the early years after independence, a whole range of issues, which had their origins in the partition of the Indian subcontinent between India and Pakistan, came before the UN. These issues included the disputed princely states of Junagadh, Hyderabad and Kashmir, which were ultimately incorporated into the Indian Union through the use of military force.

The most persistent of these disputes was the Kashmir conflict. Nehru's faith in the UN and adherence to its principles proved costly on some occasions due to the power play inherent in the organization. This was seen by his decision to refer Pakistan's intervention ('invasion') in disputed Kashmir to the UN Security Council in January 1948. The United Kingdom, which was hoping to avoid being seen as unfriendly to a Muslim state after the creation of Israel, used pressure tactics on its allies France, Canada and the US to support the Pakistani viewpoint that Kashmir's accession to India was disputable and had to be put to the test of a plebiscite. Nehru's hope that the UN would unconditionally instruct Pakistan to vacate the one-third portion of Kashmir that the Pakistani tribesmen and army had occupied fell flat in the face of geopolitical manoeuvrings and cross-issue linkage. To this day, Indian strategic commentators and critics of Nehru bemoan his cardinal mistake of taking the Kashmir dispute to a UN that was packed with pro-Pakistani partisan powers. According to columnist Brahma Chellaney, 'Nehru did not appreciate that the UN was an institution of power politics, not an impartial police force'. As if a double reminder were needed that India was small fry in a UN dominated by crafty Great Powers divided into two ideological camps, New Delhi was disappointed to find that Security Council members the US, United Kingdom and France tried to prevent it from forcibly absorbing the Portuguese colony of Goa in 1961. But for the Soviet veto in favour of India, Goa could have become enmeshed in another Kashmir-like stalemate for decades, buffeted by the changing winds of Great Power alignments and preferences that were paralysing and hijacking the UN.

Overall the period from 1947 to 1962 was marked by India's active interest in all UN activities under the leadership of V. K. Krishna Menon who was the Indian Ambassador to the United Nations from 1952 to 1962. Indian leadership and peacekeeping roles in the UN brought it considerable recognition and global standing.

==== The phase from 1962 to 1976 ====
India's defeat in the Sino-Indian War came as a grave shock compared to its global aspirations and recognition. Large-scale hostilities and military reverse dealt a shattering blow to its self-confidence and pride. India was obliged to turn towards the west for military and political support. Following the conflict with China, India became involved in two wars with Pakistan and entered a period of political instability, economic stagnation, food shortages and near-famine conditions. India's role diminished in the UN which came both as a result of its image and a deliberate decision by the post-Nehru political leadership to adopt a low profile at the UN and speak only on vital Indian interests. This change in policy was implemented during the 1965 debate on Kashmir in the Security Council when Indian Foreign Minister Swaran Singh dramatically stormed out of the session in response to the intemperate language of Zulfikar Ali Bhutto, Pakistan's Foreign Minister. In his book "India's Changing Role in the United Nations" Stanley Kochanek shows how 'bilateralism became the guiding principle of Indian foreign policy', relegating the UN to just an 'arena for maintaining such contacts'. Further the Soviet Union's backing became far more important than a slow and indecisive UN Security Council when India obtained its greatest strategic victory by beating China in the 1967 War and breaking up Pakistan into two and carving out independent Bangladesh in 1971.

In 1974, India tested its first nuclear device, the aftermath of which resulted in an atomic embargo by the US and Canada. Soon after the UN's non-proliferation agenda became another irritant that forced New Delhi to view some units of the organization with distaste as fronts for imposing discriminatory regimes instead of promoting universal disarmament. From the very beginning it has refused to lend its support to the Nuclear Non-proliferation Treaty with India's then External Affairs Minister and later President, Pranab Mukherjee in a visit to Tokyo in 2007 commenting that: "If India did not sign the NPT, it is not because of its lack of commitment for non-proliferation, but because we consider NPT as a flawed treaty and it did not recognise the need for universal, non-discriminatory verification and treatment." In short, the 1960s as a whole saw major changes in the global system but a general decline in UN activities.

==== Activities since 1976 ====
From January 2011 to January 2013, India was a non-permanent member of the UN Security Council. According to Rejaul Karim Laskar, a scholar of India's foreign policy, as a non-permanent member from January 2011 to January 2013, India played a crucial role on important international issues with a view to promote international peace and security as well as India's own national security.

==== Activities in the Council after 2020 ====
From January 2021 onwards, India became a non-permanent member of the UN Security Council for the 8th time. India's term lasted through 2021 and 2022. India became the President of the Security Council in the month of August 2021 and held the position once more in the month December 2022. India aimed to focus on issues like maritime security, peacekeeping, counter-terrorism, Africa, etc. India seeks a permanent seat in the Security Council as a member of the G4. India will bid for non-permanent member for term 2028–2029. If elected it will be her 9th term in UNSC.

==== Seeking of Permanent Seat in UNSC ====
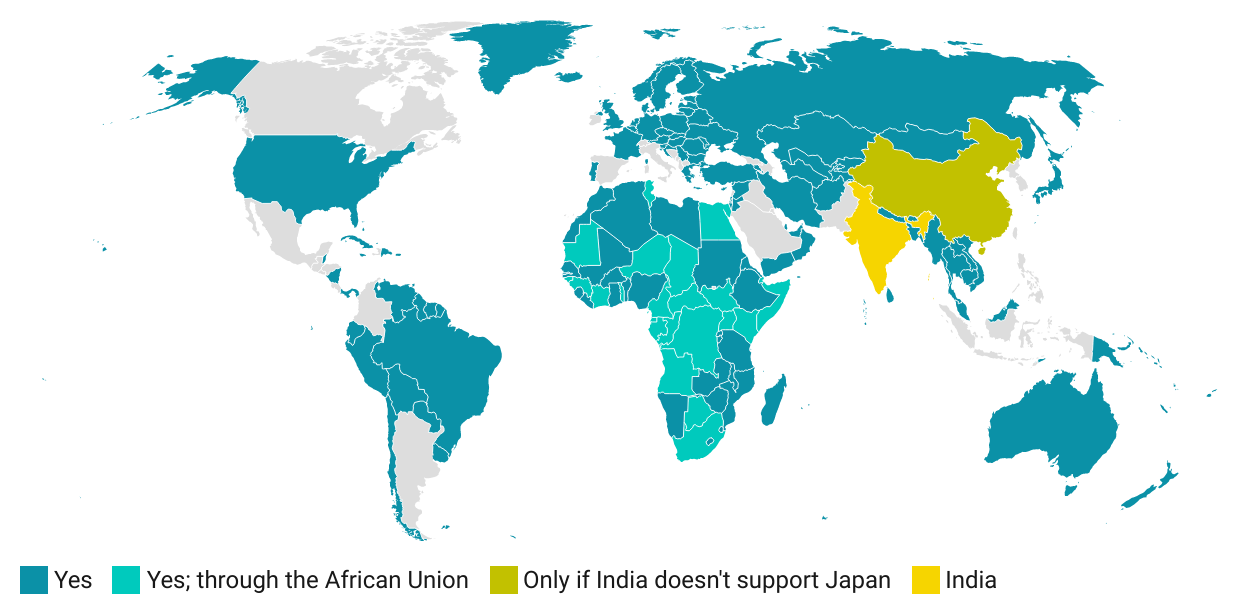
Countries that explicitly and openly support India for a permanent seat in the United Nations Security Council.

India has been elected eight times to the UN Security Council.

India has been seeking a permanent seat on the United Nations Security Council as a member of the G4, an organization composed of Brazil, Germany, Japan, and India, all who are currently seeking permanent representation. The Russian Federation, United States, United Kingdom and France support India and the other G4 countries gaining permanent seats.

The UN Security Council was envisaged as per the UN Charter, as the apex body meant to safeguard international peace and security. However, the realities of 1945, when the council was established, have long been superseded by the geo-political realities of the modern era and a new century; with the need for change being felt across the board.

To cater to these new realities and the pressing need for reforms of all aspects of UNSC, G-4 proposed to have the General Assembly increase the Security Council's membership from 15 to 25 or 26, by adding six permanent and four or five non-permanent members.

The models that only expand non-permanent seats, failed to truly address the current imbalance at the core of the Security Council, which requires the expansion and thereby reform of permanent membership of the UNSC to reflect the current realities of our world.

If this actually happens, it would be the first time permanent Security Council status is extended to a South Asian nation and supporters of the G4 plan suggest that this will lead to greater representation of developing nations rather than the current major powers.

India makes a number of claims to justify its demand. India has the world's largest population and is the world's largest liberal democracy. It is also the world's fifth largest economy and third largest in terms of purchasing power parity as of 2020. India is the largest contributor of troops to United Nations peacekeeping missions with 7,860 personnel deployed with ten UN Peacekeeping Missions as of 2014 after Bangladesh and Pakistan, all three nations being in South Asia. India has contributed more than 180,000 troops, the largest number from any country, participated in more than 43 missions and 156 Indian peacekeepers have made the supreme sacrifice while serving in UN missions. India has also provided and continues to provide eminent Force Commanders for UN Missions.

Although the U.S. and other permanent Council members were not very supportive of expanding the Security Council, in his visit to India, US President Barack Obama has offered his support for India to become a permanent member of the council. However, the reaction from other Council members are not very clear, particularly from China. Thus it is uncertain whether the demands by G4 nations will be implemented anytime soon.

According to a formal statement by Prime Minister of India Narendra Modi at the General Debate of the 75th Session of the United Nations General Assembly :

Today, people of India are concerned whether this reform-process will ever reach its logical conclusion. For how long will India be kept out of the decision-making structures of the United Nations? Reform in the responses, in the processes, and in the very character of the UN is the need of the hour. It is a fact that the faith and respect that the UN enjoys among the 1.3 billion people in India is unparalleled.

— Narendra Modi, 26 September 2020

== Others ==
=== International Court of Justice ===
From 1945 to present, a total of 4 members from India have been appointed as Judges of the International Court of Justice, the primary judicial branch of the United Nations. Moreover, Nagendra Singh was appointed as the President from 1985 to 1988. In addition, 3 members have also served as Judges sitting ad hoc. In 2017 India's Supreme Court Justice Dalveer Bhandari was appointed as a judge in the International Court of Justice for a second term.

=== UN Audit ===
In November 2016, Vinod Rai was appointed as Chairman of UN Panel of External Auditors and Shashi Kant Sharma as Member of the United Nations Board of Auditor General.

=== Joint Inspection Unit ===
Joint Inspection Unit is the only independent external oversight body of the United Nations system mandated to conduct evaluations, inspections and investigations system-wide. Achamkulangare Gopinathan currently serves as chairman, since January 2013. He was re-appointed to this post.

=== Model United Nations ===
Many schools in India have now started taking up Model United Nations to educate their students about global issues.

== Peacekeeping ==
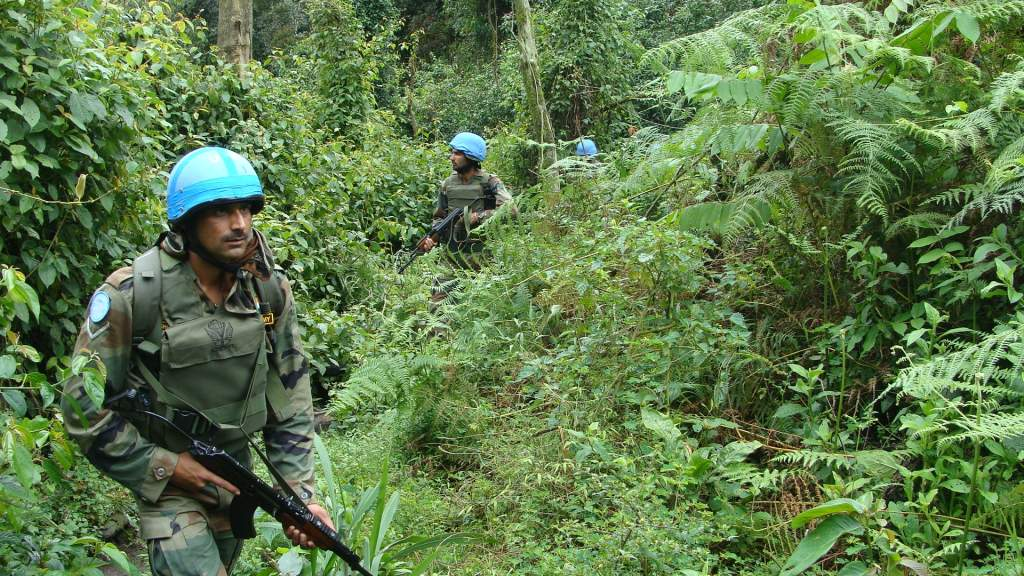
Indian soldiers patrol under UN mission in Congo, Africa

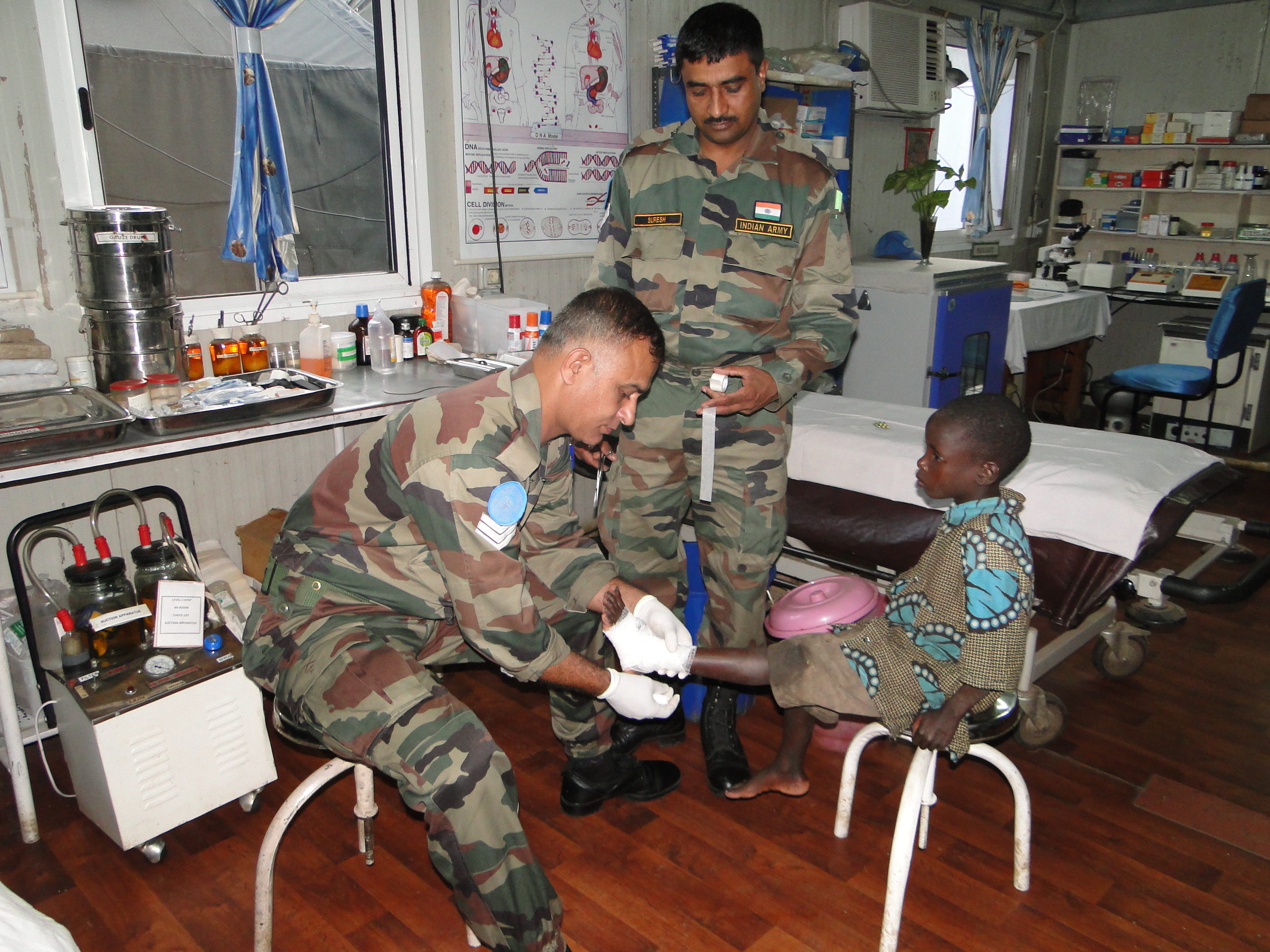
Indian Army doctors attend to a child in Congo

So far India has taken part in 43 Peacekeeping missions with a total contribution exceeding •India has contributed the most personnel to UN 2,53,000 troops and a significant number of police personnel having been deployed. In 2014 India is the third largest troop contributor (TCC) with 7,860 personnel deployed with ten UN Peacekeeping Missions of which 995 are police personnel, including the first female formed Police Unit under the UN. The Indian Army has undertaken numerous UN peacekeeping missions. As of 30 June 2014, 157 Indians have been killed during such operations. The Indian army has also provided paramedical units to facilitate the withdrawal of the sick and wounded.

In service to the United Nations, Satish Nambiar was appointed as 1st Force Commander and Head of Mission of UNPROFOR and Jai Shanker Menon as Head of Mission and Force Commander of United Nations Disengagement Observer Force.

According to UN estimates, India is currently the fourth-largest police-contributing country with 1,009 officers, and the third-largest contributor of female police officers.

As of February 2017, 163 Indians have been killed while serving in UN peacekeeping operations.

As of 16 April 2019, the United Nations had arrears of US$38 million to India for its troop contributions.

In 2023, India contribute 6073 (5946 male and 127 female) personnel in UN peacekeeping mission. Almost double than all five permanent members of UNSC.

== Initiatives ==
=== International Yoga Day ===
On 11 December 2014, the United Nations General Assembly adopted without a vote a resolution commemorating 21 June as the International Yoga Day, recognising the holistic benefits of this timeless practice and its inherent compatibility with the principles and values of the United Nations.

=== Plea for International Equality Day ===
In 2016, with focus on combating inequalities to achieve Sustainable Development Goals, B. R. Ambedkar's birth anniversary was observed at the United Nations for the first time. India has made a plea to declare April 14 as International Equality Day.

== Financial contribution ==
For Fiscal Year 2015–16, India's contribution to the United Nations was ₹2,440,000,000 (US$25 million), which was 55 per cent more compared with the previous fiscal year. India is a contributor to the UN regular budget. Indian contribution to United Nations Democracy Fund was US$250 million until 2009. India contributed US$30,540,402 for 2023 and US$32,895,257 for the 2024 UN budget.

== Representation ==
India has a permanent mission to the UN, which is led by the Permanent Representative (UN Ambassador), currently Parvathaneni Harish, who was appointed in September 2024.

== See also ==
- United Nations Military Observer Group in India and Pakistan
- UNHCR Representation in India
- Foreign relations of India
- G4 nations
- Reform of the United Nations Security Council
