= Ruchira Kamboj =

Indian diplomat (born 1964)

Ruchira Kamboj IFS
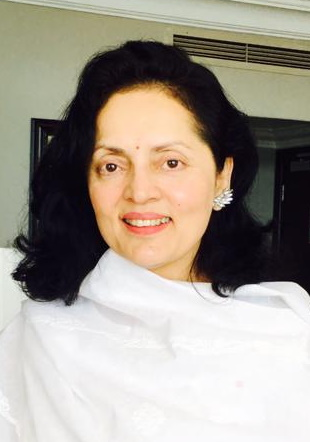

Permanent Representative of India to the United Nations
- In office 1 August 2022 – 31 May 2024
- President: Droupadi Murmu
- Preceded by: T. S. Tirumurti
- Succeeded by: Parvathaneni Harish

Indian Ambassador to Bhutan
- In office February 2019 – June 2022
- Preceded by: Jaideep Sarkar
- Succeeded by: Sudhakar Dalela

High Commissioner of India to South Africa
- In office July 2017 – February 2019
- Preceded by: Ruchi Ghanashyam

Permanent Representative of India to UNESCO
- In office April 2014 – July 2017
- Preceded by: Vinay Sheel Oberoi
- Succeeded by: Vinay Mohan Kwatra

Chief of Protocol
- In office June 2011 – April 2014
- Preceded by: Sunil Kumar Lal
- Succeeded by: Jaideep Mazumdar

President of the United Nations Security Council
- In office December 2022 — January 2023

Personal details
- Born: 3 May 1964 (age 62) Lucknow, Uttar Pradesh, India
- Spouse: Diwakar Kamboj
- Children: 1
- Education: (M.A.) Delhi University
- Alma mater: University of Lucknow, Delhi University
- Occupation: Diplomat

Ruchira Kamboj (née Patni, born 3 May 1964) is a retired Indian diplomat of 1987 batch of Indian Foreign Service who has served as the India's Permanent Representative to the United Nations from August 2022 to May 2024 until her retirement. She has previously served as High Commissioner of India to South Africa, first female Indian Ambassador to Bhutan and Ambassador/Permanent Representative of India to UNESCO, Paris.

On 21 June 2022, Kamboj was appointed as the Ambassador/Permanent Representative–designate of India to the United Nations in New York. Her appointment made her the first female Permanent Representative of India to the United Nations. She assumed charge as PR on 2 August 2022 and served there till 31 May 2024.

She served as the President of the UN Security Council in December 2022, becoming the first woman from India to hold this position.

== Professional career ==
=== Entry into the Indian Foreign Service ===
Ruchira Kamboj joined the Indian Foreign Service in 1987, emerging as the All India women's topper and the topper of the Foreign Service batch.

=== First Posting in Paris ===
She began her diplomatic career in Paris, serving as the Third Secretary at the Indian Embassy from 1989 to 1991. During this period, she studied French at the Institut Catholique and the Alliance française. Upon completing her language studies, she worked as Second Secretary, dealing with political issues.

=== Service in Delhi and Mauritius ===
Under Secretary in Delhi: Returning to Delhi, she served as Under Secretary in the Europe West Division of India's Ministry of External Affairs from 1991 to 1996. She managed India's relations with France, the UK, the BENELUX countries, Italy, Spain, and Portugal. She also handled India's relationship with the Commonwealth of Nations and represented India at the 14th Commonwealth Heads of Government Meeting in Auckland, New Zealand, in October 1995.

Posting in Mauritius: From 1996 to 1999, she was First Secretary (Economic and Commercial) and Head of Chancery at the Indian High Commission in Port Louis, Mauritius. She played a key role in organizing the state visit of Prime Minister Deve Gowda to Mauritius in 1998 and Prime Minister IK Gujral's visit to South Africa in 1997.

=== Key Roles in India ===
Deputy Secretary and Director in Delhi: Upon her return to Delhi, Kamboj served as Deputy Secretary and later Director in charge of Foreign Service Personnel and Cadre in the Ministry of External Affairs from June 1999 to March 2002, marking one of the longest tenures in this critical administrative role.

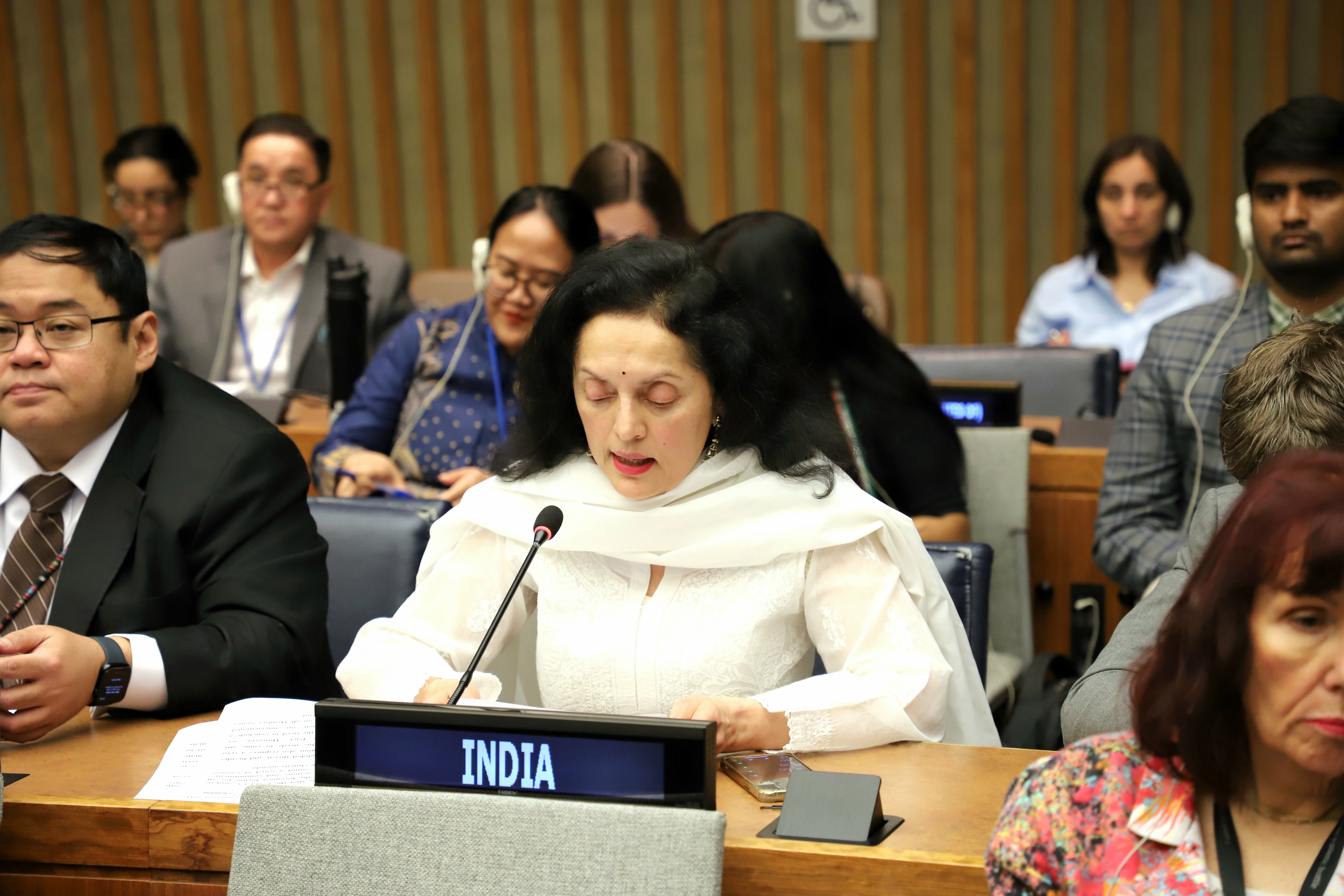
Ruchira was the All India women's topper of the 1987 Civil Services batch and the top performer of the 1987 Foreign Service batch

United Nations, New York

Counsellor at the Permanent Mission: From 2002 to 2005, she was posted as Counsellor at India's Permanent Mission to the United Nations in New York. She handled a range of political issues including UN Peacekeeping and UN Security Council Reform, and was part of the G-4 team working on Security Council expansion.

=== Consul General and Commonwealth Secretariat ===
Consul General in Cape Town: Serving as India's Consul General in Cape Town from 2006 to 2009, she liaised closely with the South African Parliament and managed high-profile visits, including those of the President of India and the President of the Congress Party.

Deputy Head at Commonwealth Secretariat: Kamboj was Deputy Head of the Office of the Secretary General at the Commonwealth Secretariat in London. She attended the 2009 Commonwealth Heads of Government Meeting in Trinidad and Tobago.

=== Chief of Protocol ===
Historic Role: From 2011 to 2014, she served as India's Chief of Protocol, the first and only woman to hold this position. She directed all outgoing visits of high-ranking officials and managed incoming visits of foreign dignitaries, including handling international summits such as the 4th BRICS Summit and the ASEAN India Commemorative Summit.

=== Ambassador to UNESCO, Paris ===
- Notable Contributions and Achievements: Appointed as India's Ambassador to UNESCO in Paris in 2014, Kamboj made significant contributions to India's cultural and heritage diplomacy. During her tenure, three Indian sites were added to UNESCO's World Heritage list in 2016: Nalanda Mahavihara, the Capitol Complex of Chandigarh, and Khangchendzonga National Park, marking an unprecedented achievement for India. Earlier, in 2014, she was instrumental in getting Rani ki Vav and The Great Himalayan National Park inscribed on the World Heritage List.
- Promoting Indian Heritage: In 2015, Kamboj successfully facilitated the inclusion of Varanasi and Jaipur as India's first Creative Cities in the UNESCO list. Her efforts bore fruit again in December 2016, when Yoga was declared as an Intangible Cultural Heritage of Humanity, a milestone for India's cultural heritage on a global platform.
- Historic Inscription: In July 2017, she led the initiative to inscribe Ahmedabad as India's first World Heritage City, garnering the full support of the World Heritage Committee of UNESCO. Under her leadership, India established its first UNESCO Chair on Gender Equality and Women's Empowerment at Amrita Vishwa Vidyapeetham, Kerala.
- Prominent Conferences: In April 2016, Kamboj organized an International Conference on the Zero at UNESCO, showcasing India's significant contributions to mathematics and science. The conference featured eminent mathematicians from around the world, including Fields Medalists Professor Manjul Bhargava and Professor Laurent Lafforgue. To honor India's mathematical heritage, a bust of the ancient Indian mathematician Aryabhata was gifted to UNESCO, now adorning the principal entrance of the organization.

=== India-Africa Forum Summit ===
Special Assignments: In 2015, she was called back to assist in organizing the 3rd India-Africa Forum Summit, which saw participation from the Heads of State and Government of the 54-member African Union.

=== High Commissioner to South Africa and Lesotho ===
- Strengthening Bilateral Relations: From July 2017 to March 2019, Kamboj served as the High Commissioner of India to South Africa, concurrently accredited to the Kingdom of Lesotho. Her tenure was marked by several high-profile visits and initiatives that bolstered India-South Africa relations.
- India-South Africa Business Summit: She organized the first-ever India-South Africa Business Summit in Johannesburg on April 29–30, 2018. The event saw significant participation from business leaders and government officials, including Commerce and Industry Minister Suresh Prabhu, aiming to enhance trade and investment ties between the two nations.
- Commemoration of the Pietermaritzburg Incident: In June 2018, External Affairs Minister Sushma Swaraj attended the 125th anniversary of the Pietermaritzburg incident, a pivotal event in Mahatma Gandhi's life. This commemoration served as a precursor to Gandhi's 150th birth anniversary celebrations and included the installation of a unique two-sided bust of Gandhi and an interactive digital museum at Pietermaritzburg station in Durban.
- Defense Ties and Prime Ministerial Visits: During her tenure, the resolution of the Denel issue reopened defense ties between India and South Africa after a prolonged gap. Additionally, Prime Minister Narendra Modi's visit to Johannesburg in July 2018 for the BRICS summit reaffirmed the strategic importance of the India-South Africa relationship. President Cyril Ramaphosa’s visit to India as the Chief Guest for the 70th Republic Day Parade in January 2019 further underscored the strong bilateral ties.

=== Ambassador to Bhutan ===
Key Initiatives: Appointed as the 18th Ambassador to Bhutan in 2019, she facilitated numerous initiatives, including the introduction of the RuPay Card, the launch of the India-Bhutan Satellite project, and the opening of new trade routes. India's efforts during the COVID-19 pandemic were recognized with Bhutan's highest civilian honor awarded to Prime Minister Narendra Modi in 2021.

== PR / Ambassador of India to the United Nations, New York ==
Ruchira Kamboj formally assumed the position of PR / Ambassador of India to New York 2 August 2022.

During her tenure, she notably represented India in the UN Security Council from August to December 2022, achieving the unique distinction of becoming the first Indian woman to preside over the Security Council in December 2022.

=== Her stint at the UN was marked by several accomplishments ===
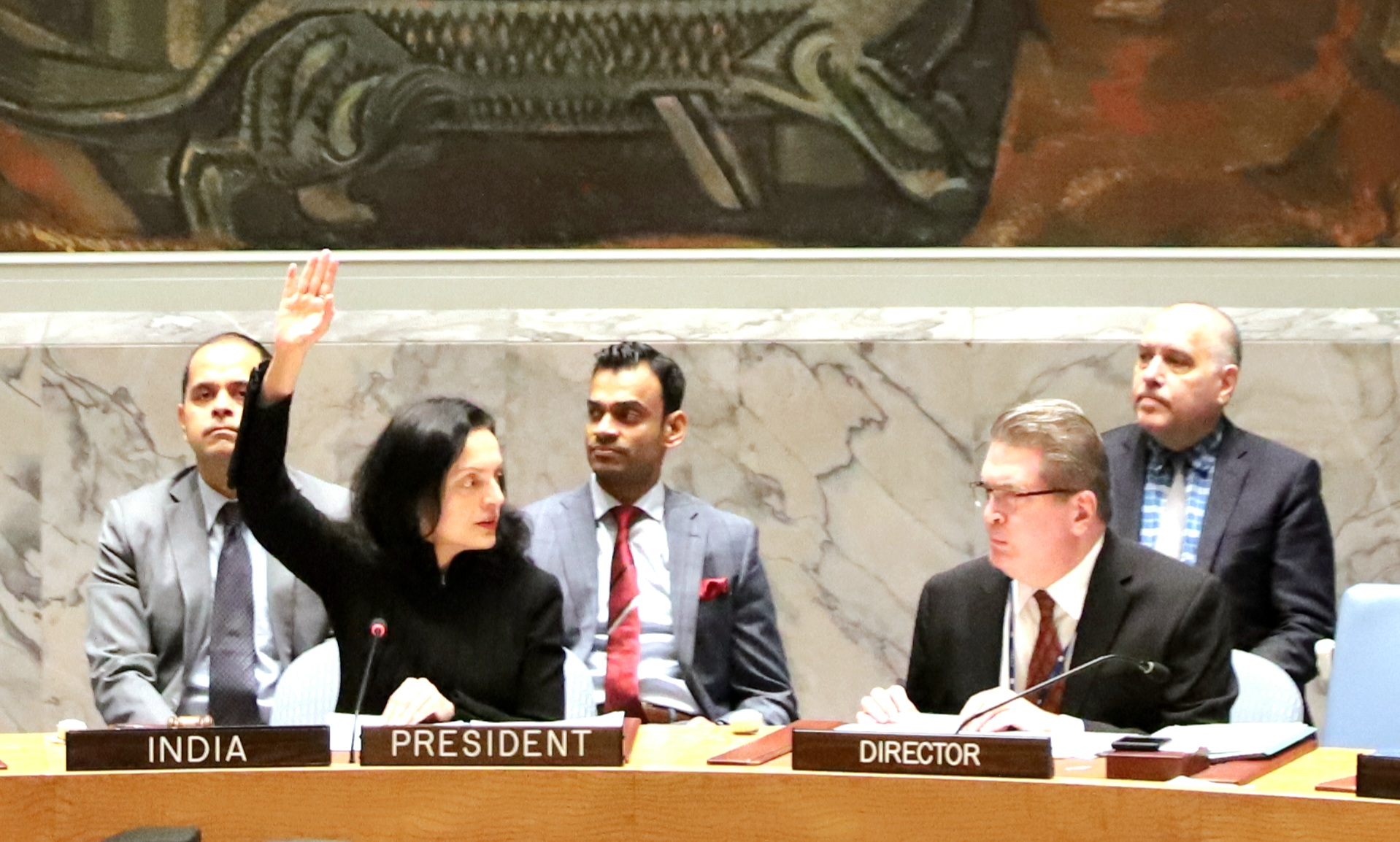
Ruchira Kamboj, as the President of the United Nations Security Council

- In October 2022, she chaired the first meeting of the UN Security Council Counter-Terrorism Committee held outside New York in seven years, culminating in the adoption of the New Delhi Declaration—a major milestone.
- In December 2022, she served as the President of the UN Security Council, where she led two signature meetings in an open format focused on reformed multilateralism and counter-terrorism, aligning with India's foreign policy priorities. A Presidential Statement on counter-terrorism was adopted under her presidency. Additionally, under her stewardship, a bust of Mahatma Gandhi was installed in the prestigious North Lawns of the UN and was inaugurated by Secretary-General António Guterres and Foreign Minister S. Jaishankar.
- A historic moment of her term was the adoption of a Resolution spearheaded by India to establish a peacekeeping memorial wall, receiving support from 190 member states—the highest support ever for any UN resolution.

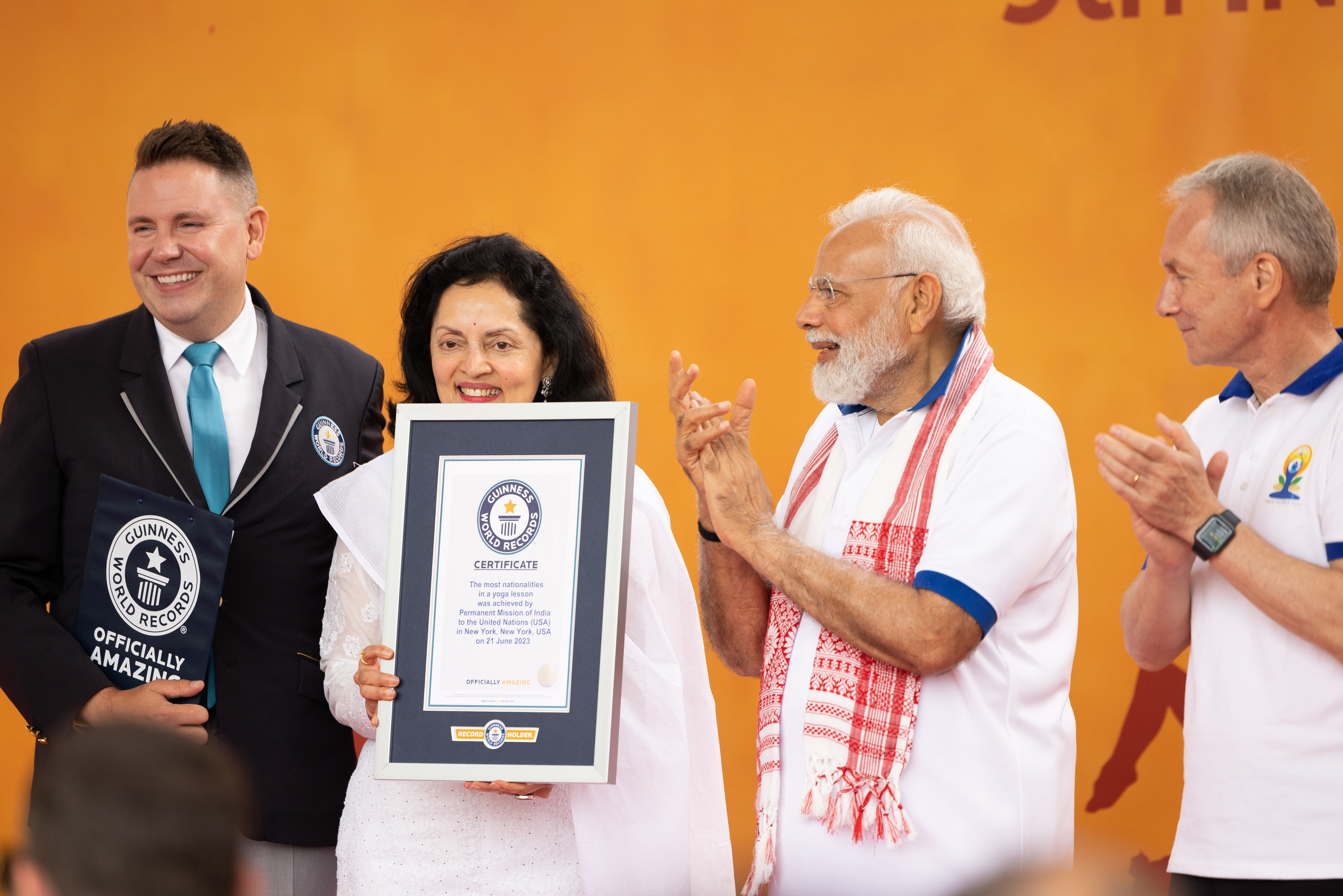
Spearheaded India's initiative in June 2023 to establish a Guinness World Record for a yoga session with maximum nationalities present at UN HQ, New York

- She highlighted International Yoga Day on 21 June 2023, setting a Guinness World Record for the most nationalities participating in a single yoga session, in the presence of Prime Minister Narendra Modi.
- Two international conferences were significant highlights: the Conference on Vasudhaiva Kutumbakam in October 2023 and the first International Conference on Digital Public Infrastructure in April 2024.

== Personal life ==
Her father served as an officer in the Indian Army, while her mother was a professor of Sanskrit at the University of Delhi. Due to her father's military postings, she received her education in various cities, including Delhi, Vadodara, and Jammu. She went on to complete her higher education at Isabella Thoburn College in Lucknow and then earned a postgraduate degree in Political Science and International Relations from Delhi University.

She is married and has a daughter. Ruchira is proficient in three languages: Hindi, English, and French. Her body of work includes numerous op-eds and publications related to her field. Additionally, her expertise has led to invitations to speak at distinguished forums both in India and around the world, including notable appearances at Harvard University and Columbia University
