= B. N. Rau =

Indian civil servant and jurist (1887–1953)

Sir B. N. Rau
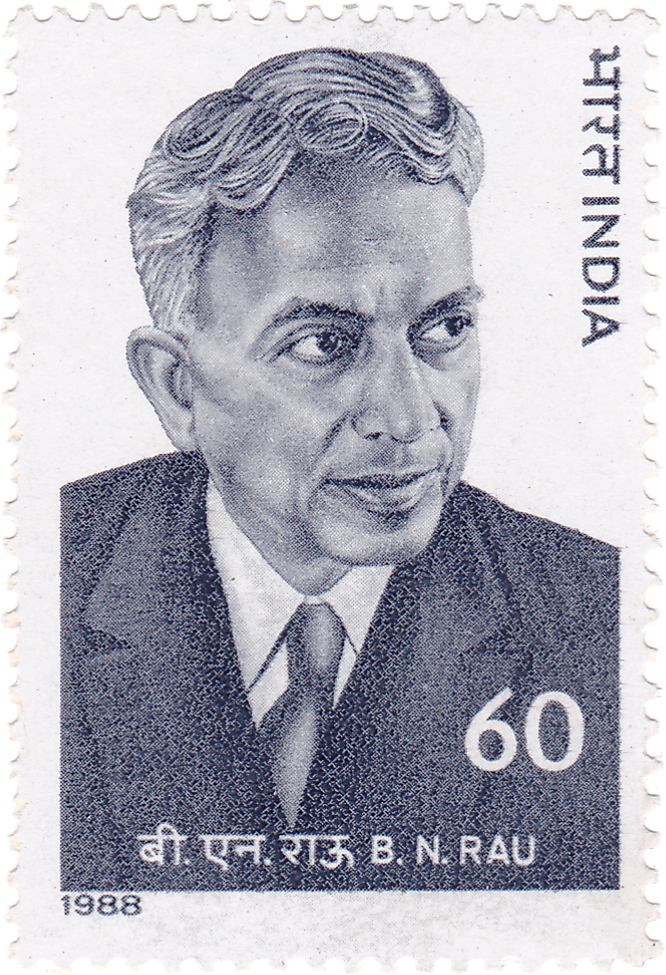
- Rau on 1988 stamp of India

Permanent Representative of India to the United Nations
- In office March 1948 – 1952
- Preceded by: Samar Sen
- Succeeded by: Rajeshwar Dayal

Judge of the International Court of Justice
- In office 1952–1953
- Preceded by: Charles de Visscher
- Succeeded by: Muhammad Zafarullah Khan

President of the United Nations Security Council
- In office June 1950 — July 1950; March 1951 — April 1951

Minister of Jammu & Kashmir
- In office 1944–1945
- Preceded by: Kailash Nath Haksar
- Succeeded by: Ram Chandra Kak

Personal details
- Born: 26 February 1887 Mangalore, British India (now Mangaluru, Karnataka, India)
- Died: 30 November 1953 (aged 66) Zürich, Switzerland
- Occupation: Civil servant; Jurist; Judge of the International Court of Justice; Constitutional scholar
- Known for: Legal advisor to constituent assembly

Sir Benegal Narsing Rau CIE (26 February 1887 – 30 November 1953) was an Indian civil servant, jurist, diplomat and statesman known for his role as the constitutional advisor to the Constituent Assembly of India. He was also India's representative to the United Nations Security Council from 1950 to 1952.

Rau helped draft the constitutions of Burma in 1947 and India in 1950. He was the constitutional advisor of the constituent assembly of India. He was India's representative to the United Nations Security Council from 1950 to 1952, and was serving as its president when it recommended armed assistance to South Korea in June 1950. Later he was a member of the Korean War post Armistice United Nations Command Military Armistice Commission (UNCMAC).

A graduate of the Universities of Madras and Cambridge, Rau entered the Indian civil service in 1910. After revising the entire Indian statutory code (1935–37), he was knighted in 1938 and made judge of the Bengal High Court at Calcutta in 1939. His writings on Indian law include a noted study on constitutional precedents as well as articles on human rights in India. He served briefly (1944–45) as Minister of Jammu and Kashmir state. From February 1952 until his death, he was a judge of the International Court of Justice at The Hague. Before his election to the court, he was regarded as a candidate for secretary-general of the United Nations. Sir B. N. Rau's brothers were Governor of the Reserve Bank of India Benegal Rama Rau and journalist and politician B. Shiva Rao.

== Early life and education ==
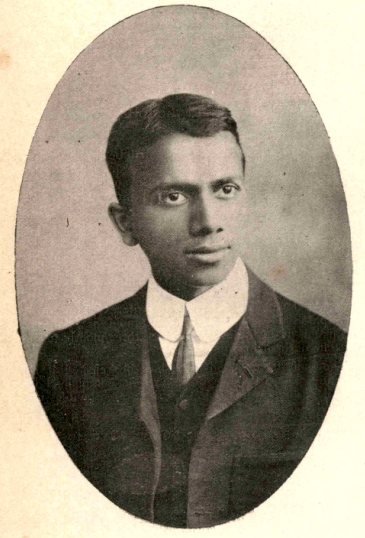
c. 1909

B. N. Rau was born during the late British Raj on 26 February 1887 in a Hindu Konkani-speaking Saraswat Brahmin family. His father Benegal Raghavendra Rau was an eminent doctor. Rau graduated from the Canara High School, Mangalore (Ancient Tulunad Head quarters), topping the list of students of the entire Madras Presidency. He graduated in 1905 with a triple first degree in English, Physics, and Sanskrit, and gained an additional first in Mathematics in 1906. On a scholarship, he proceeded to Trinity College, Cambridge, and took his Tripos in 1909, just missing the Wranglership coming out ninth.

== Bureaucratic and judicial career ==
B. N. Rau returned to British India after successfully passing the Indian Civil Service Examination in 1909, posted to Bengal. Doing well on the executive side, in 1909 he moved to the judiciary thereafter, and served as a judge in several districts in East Bengal. In 1925, he was offered a dual position by the Assam government, as Secretary to the provincial council and Legal Remembrancer to the government. He served in this position for about eight years. In addition to these duties, he occasionally fulfilled additional functions for the Assam government, such as drafting memoranda for financial support for the Simon Commission's tour of India in 1928–29, and presenting their case before the Joint Select Committee of Parliament in London after the third Round Table Conference in 1933. He also worked with Sir John Kerr to prepare a note on how provincial legislatures in India might be designed to work better.

On his return to India in 1935, Rau worked with the Reforms Office of the Government of India, on drafting the Government of India Act, 1935. At the end of this project, Sir Maurice Gwyer, the first Chief Justice of India's Federal Court, suggested that he gain the necessary five years' experience that would qualify him to serve as a judge on the Federal Court as well. He served thereafter as a judge on the Calcutta High Court, but his tenure was interrupted by two additional projects that he was assigned to by the Government of India – he first presided over a court of inquiry concerning wages and working conditions on railways in India, and thereafter with a commission working on reforms concerning Hindu law. He also was reassigned to chair the Indus Waters Commission, which submitted a report on riparian rights on in 1942.

His distinguished work brought him a Companion of the Order of the Indian Empire (CIE) in the 1934 New Year Honours list and a knighthood in 1938. Rau retired from service in 1944, and was then appointed as the Prime Minister of the princely state of Jammu and Kashmir. He resigned from this position in 1945, following differences with the then-Maharaja of Kashmir, writing in his resignation letter that "...I have been conscious for some time that we do not see eye to eye on certain fundamental matters of external and internal policy. And that leads, as it must lead, to disagreement in many a detail. I have never questioned and I do not now question, the position that in all these matters Your Highness' decision must be final. The Prime Minister must either accept it or resign."

Following his resignation as Chief Minister of Kashmir, Rau was asked to serve in a temporary capacity in the Reforms Office of the Government of India, which he did so. He was also offered, and declined, the position of a permanent judge on the Calcutta High Court, preferring to stay in the Reforms office and work on constitutional and federal issues. He was consequently appointed as a Secretary in the Governor-General's office, working on constitutional reforms, until he became the Constitutional Advisor to the Constituent Assembly in 1946.

While the Constituent Assembly was engaged in discussing the draft Constitution, Rau also worked on preparing a brief on the question of whether the United Nations Security Council could intervene in a dispute between the Nizam of Hyderabad and the Indian government, and was part of a delegation that represented India at the United Nations General Assembly, concerning this question as well as issued relating to the peaceful uses of atomic energy.

== Role in drafting the Constitution of India ==
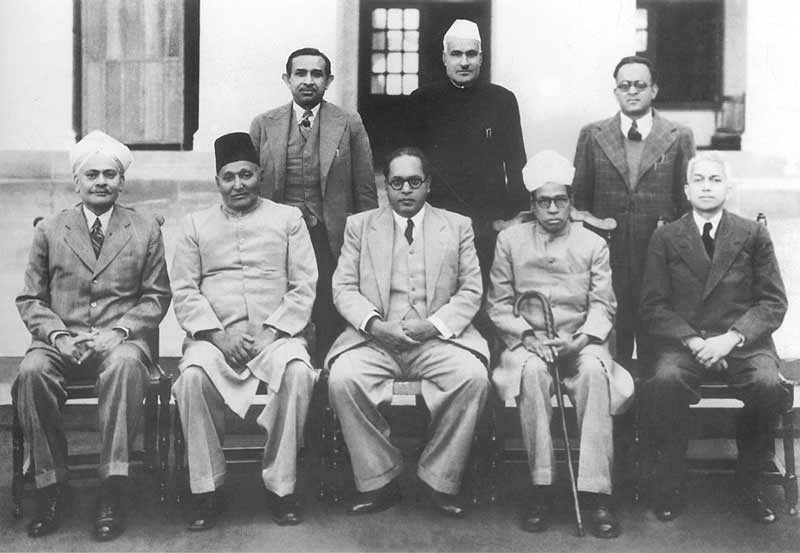
B. N. Rau (sitting extreme right) with Ambedkar and other members of the Drafting Committee of the Indian Constitution on Aug. 29, 1947.

B. N. Rau was appointed as the constitutional adviser to the Constituent Assembly in formulating the Indian Constitution in 1946.

As part of his research in drafting the Constitution of India, in 1946, Rau traveled to the US, Canada, Ireland, and the United Kingdom, where he had personal consultations with judges, scholars, and authorities on constitutional law. Amongst others, he met Justice Felix Frankfurter of the American Supreme Court, who famously advised him against the inclusion of a clause for 'due process' in the Indian Constitution as it would impose an 'undue burden' on the judiciary.

The Constituent Assembly's resolution set up the Drafting Committee on 29 August 1947, under the chairmanship of B. R. Ambedkar, declared that it was being set up to "Scrutinise the Draft of the text of the Constitution prepared by the Constitutional Adviser, give into effect the decisions taken already in the Assembly and include all matters ancillary thereto or which have to be provided in such a Constitution, and to submit to the Assembly for consideration the text of the Draft Constitution as revised by the Committee." The draft prepared by the constitutional advisor was submitted in October 1947. Along with this draft, the proposals offered by the various other committees set up by the Constituent Assembly were considered. The first draft by the Drafting Committee was published in February 1948. The people of India were given eight months to discuss the draft and propose amendments. In the light of the public comments, criticisms, and suggestions, the Drafting Committee prepared a second draft, which was published in October 1948. The final draft of the Constitution was introduced by Ambedkar on 4 November 1948 (first reading). The second reading was clause by clause consideration and took over a year. After three drafts and three readings, the constitution was declared as passed on 26 November 1949. Ambedkar in his concluding speech in constituent assembly on 25 November 1949 stated that:

The credit that is given to me does not really belong to me. It belongs partly to Sir B.N. Rau the Constitutional Advisor to the Constituent Assembly who prepared a rough draft of the Constitution for the consideration of the Drafting Committee.

== Role in drafting the Constitution of Burma ==
Rao also assisted in drafting the early Constitution of Myanmar, or Burma, as it was then known. He met with U Aung San, Burma's Prime Minister, in New Delhi in December 1946, who invited him to assist in drafting Burma's Constitution. Burma's Constitutional Advisor was deputed to New Delhi in April 1947 where they worked together to collect research materials and prepared a first draft that was taken back to Rangoon for modifications by a Drafting Committee. The Constitution was adopted on 24 September 1947. Rau went to Rangoon (now Yangon) to witness the final draft of the Constitution being passed by the legislature.

== Diplomatic career ==
Rau served India as a representing delegate in the United Nations. From 1949 to 1952 he was India's Permanent Representative to the UN, till he was appointed a Judge of the International Court in The Hague. He also served as the President of the United Nations Security Council in June 1950.

=== Court of International Justice ===
Rau was invited by the Ministry of External Affairs to stand for election to the International Court of Justice towards the end of 1951, and began service towards 1952. He served for about a year, before succumbing to ill health while being treated in Zurich in 1953.

== Death and legacy ==
Rau died of intestinal cancer at Zurich on 30 November 1953. The Prime Minister of India Jawaharlal Nehru spoke in Parliament about his death and the house paid tribute by observing a moment of silence. In 1988, on the occasion of his birth centenary, the Govt. of India issued a postage stamp in honor of B.N. Rau.

== Publications ==
- B.N. Rau (1947) Constitutional Precedents (New Delhi: Government of India Press)
- B.N. Rau (1948) The Constitution of the Union of Burma, 23 Wash. L. Rev. & St. B. J. 288
- B. N. Rau (1949) The Parliamentary System of Government in India 24 Wash. L. Rev. & St. B. J. 91
- B.N. Rau (1949) The Indian Constitution (Manchester: Manchester Guardian)
- B.N. Rau (1951) India and the Far East: Burwash Memorial Lectures (Toronto: Victoria University)
- Rau, B. N. (1960). Rao, B. Shiva (ed.). India's Constitution in the Making. Calcutta: Orient Longmans.
