= Chinmaya Gharekhan =

Indian diplomat

Chinmaya R. Gharekhan

Permanent Representative of India to the United Nations
- In office October 1986 – December 1992
- Preceded by: Natarajan Krishnan
- Succeeded by: Mohammad Hamid Ansari

President of the United Nations Economic and Social Council
- In office 1990–1992

President of the United Nations Security Council
- In office October 1991 — November 1991; December 1992 — January 1993

Chinmaya R. Gharekhan (born July 4, 1934) is a former Indian diplomat. He has been longest serving Permanent representative of India to the United Nations and President of United Nations Economic and Social Council.

== Early life ==
Chinmaya Gharekhan was born on July 4, 1934, in Dabhoi, a village in the Indian state of Gujarat. He was one of four children born in a well-off family. His father, Dr. Rajaninath Gharekhan, was a civil surgeon to the former state of Baroda (now Vadodara).

== Career ==
He served as chairman of International Control Commission in Laos from 1973 to 1975, Indian ambassador to Vietnam from 1975 to 1976, Indian ambassador to the United Nations in Geneva from 1977 to 1980, advisor on foreign affairs to the prime minister of India from 1981 to 1986.

He served as India's permanent representative to the United Nations, and was elected to be the president of the United Nations Economic and Social Council in 1990.

In January 1993 was appointed by the UN Secretary General as a special envoy to the Middle East peace process in the capacity of Under-Secretary-General of the United Nations, a position he held until 30 September 1999. From 2005 to 2009 he served as special envoy of India for the Middle East.

He was president of the Indira Gandhi National Centre for the Arts.

Diplomatic posts
Preceded by Edouard Brunner	UN Special Coordinator for the Middle East Peace Process; Jan. 1, 1993 – Sept. 30, 1999	Succeeded by Terje Rød-Larsen
