= Vinay Sheel Oberoi =

Indian Administrative Service Officer

Secretary, Department of Higher Education, Ministry of Human Resource Development, Government of India
- In office June 2015 – February 2017
- Preceded by: Satyanarayan Mohanty
- Succeeded by: Kewal Kumar Sharma

Secretary, Ministry of Women and Child Development, Government of India
- In office 22 July 2014 – June 2015
- Preceded by: Shankar Agarwal
- Succeeded by: V. Somasundaran

Ambassador & Permanent Representative of India to UNESCO
- In office 15 July 2010 – 22 July 2014
- Succeeded by: Ruchira Kamboj

Personal details
- Born: 18 February 1957 (age 69)
- Died: April 11, 2020
- Education: The Doon School; Delhi School of Economics, University of Delhi
- Occupation: Retired Indian Administrative Service officer

Vinay Sheel Oberoi (18 February 1957 – 11 April 2020) was a IAS Officer of the 1979 batch. He belonged to the Assam-Meghalaya Cadre. Oberoi served as the Ambassador & Permanent Representative of India to UNESCO from 2010 to 2014, as well as Secretary to the Government of India, in the Ministry of Women and Child Development, and in the Department of Higher Education, Ministry of Human Resources Development.

== Education ==
Oberoi studied at The Doon School. He had a postgraduate degree in Economics from the Delhi School of Economics. Oberoi was the president of the Delhi School of Economics Students Union from 1977 to 1978.

== Early career ==
Oberoi taught economics at Ramjas College, Delhi University, before joining the Indian Administrative Service (IAS) in 1979. He was one of the youngest officers in his batch.

== Ambassador and Permanent Representative of India to UNESCO ==
In 2010, Oberoi was assigned as the Ambassador and Permanent Representative of India to UNESCO. He coordinated the G77 and China as Chairperson.

== Secretary to the Government of India ==
In 2014, Oberoi returned to New Delhi to serve as Secretary, Women and Child Development from 2014 to 2015.

== Post-retirement ==
On 21 September 2017, Oberoi was appointed as an Independent Director of the Bharat Petroleum Corporation Limited.

In April, it was announced that Oberoi would also be the chairperson of the committee formed to examine the process of CBSE class examinations, with a view to prevent leakages. In 2018, Oberoi joined Jio Institute as an advisor. He was also an advisor to the National Crafts Museum.

In retirement, he was one of the founding members of the Siang Rush festival.
