= Edouard Brunner =

Swiss diplomat

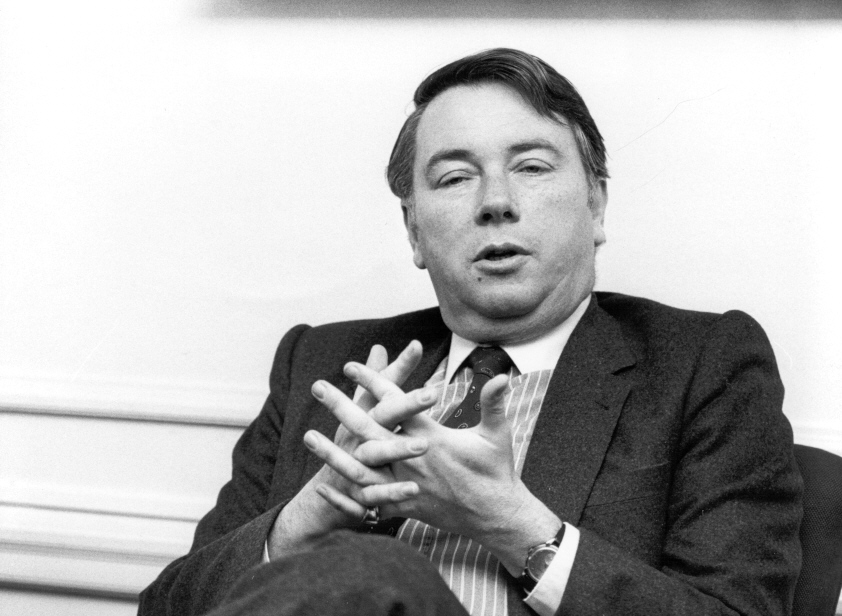
Edouard Brunner (1983)

Edouard Brunner (February 24, 1932 – June 25, 2007) was a Swiss diplomat, ambassador, and United Nations mediator.

== Biography ==
Brunner was born in Istanbul. A product of a diplomatic family, he studied law in Geneva and entered the Swiss Federal Department of Foreign Affairs in 1956. He began his diplomatic career with posts in Bogotá, Washington, D.C., Warsaw, The Hague, and the United Nations in New York City. In the 1960s he married Mirjam Rahola. They had three children, two girls, Caroline and Irene, and one boy, Mark.

In the 1970s, Brunner participated in the Conference on Security and Cooperation in Europe including the 1975 signing of the Helsinki Accords. In 1980, he returned to Bern to head the political division and, in 1984, was Secretary of State for Swiss Federal Council member Pierre Aubert and was second-in-command at the Swiss Foreign Ministry.

In 1984, Brunner was involved in secret talks held in Switzerland aimed at restoring ties between the United Kingdom and Argentina which were severed during the 1982 Falklands War. Brunner caused a stir in 2002 when his memoirs described UK Prime Minister Margaret Thatcher as "vindictive" towards the newly-democratic Argentina during those 1984 talks.

From 1989 to 1993, Brunner served as Switzerland's Ambassador to the United States. And from 1993 to 1997 as ambassador to France, with residence at the Hôtel de Besenval. In 1991, United Nations Secretary-General Javier Pérez de Cuéllar named Brunner to be the U.N.'s envoy to the Middle East. In 1993 and 1994, Brunner led a successful U.N. mission to end the War in Abkhazia. He served as a diplomat for UNESCO from 1995 until his retirement in March 1997.

In 1998, when Swiss banks were being criticized for Holocaust-era conduct, Brunner briefly came out of retirement in order to improve the image of the banking system.

Edouard Brunner died from an illness at his home near Nyon on Lake Geneva.

His widow Mirjam died in 2012, in Switzerland.

Diplomatic posts
Preceded by Gunnar Jarring	UN Sec. Gen. Special Representative to the Middle East; March 22, 1991 – Dec. 31, 1992	Succeeded by Chinmaya Gharekhan
