= Rajeshwar Dayal =

Indian diplomat and writer (1909–1999)

Ambassador of India to France
- In office 1965–1967
- Preceded by: Ali Yavar Jung

Foreign Secretary of India
- In office 19 August 1967 – 6 November 1968
- Preceded by: Chandra Shekhar Jha
- Succeeded by: Triloki Nath Kaul

Permanent Representative of India to the United Nations
- In office 1952 – August 1954
- Preceded by: B. N. Rau
- Succeeded by: Arthur S. Lall

Personal details
- Born: 12 August 1909 Nainital, United Provinces, British India
- Died: 17 September 1999 (aged 90) New Delhi, India
- Occupation: Diplomat; Writer
- Known for: United Nations Operation in the Congo operations
- Awards: Padma Vibhushan

Rajeshwar Dayal (12 August 1909 – 17 September 1999) was an Indian diplomat, writer, Ambassador of India to the former state of Yugoslavia and the Head of the United Nations Operation in the Congo (ONUC).

Dayal was born 12 August 1909 in Nainital. Dayal was one of the earlier officers of the Indian Foreign Service. He served as the Indian ambassador to the now defunct Yugoslavia from 1955 to 1958 and moved to the UN as a member of the United Nations Observation Group in Lebanon (UNOGIL) when the organization was established in 1958. Dayal, who had earlier served as the Indian Ambassador to France, was appointed the Head of the United Nations Operation in the Congo in September 1960 and held the post until May 1961. He also worked as the Representative of the Secretary General of the United Nations. He published several books on socio-political themes, including a book on Panchayati Raj under the title, Panchayati Raj in India. The Government of India awarded him the second highest civilian award of the Padma Vibhushan, (then the highest civilian award) in 1969.

He died on 17 September 1999 in New Delhi, following a stroke. His life has been documented in his autobiography, A Life of Our Times, published in 1998, one year prior to his death.

== See also ==
- United Nations Operation in the Congo

Diplomatic posts
Preceded by	Indian Ambassador in Belgrade; 1955–58	Succeeded by Ali Yavar Jung
Preceded by Andrew W. Cordier	Head of the United Nations Operation in the Congo; 1960–61	Succeeded by Mekki Abbas
Preceded by C. S. Jha	Foreign Secretary of India; 1967 - 1968	Succeeded by Triloki Nath Kaul
