= Gurjit Singh (ambassador) =

Indian diplomat

Indian Ambassador to Germany
- In office January 2016 – March 2017
- Preceded by: Vijay Keshav Gokhale
- Succeeded by: Mukta Dutta Tomar

Indian Ambassador to Indonesia and Timor Leste
- Preceded by: Biren Nanda

Personal details
- Born: March 11, 1958 (age 68)
- Spouse: Neeru Singh
- Children: 2
- Education: Mayo College, Ajmer
- Occupation: IFS
- Profession: Civil Servant

Gurjit Singh is an Indian civil servant of the Indian Foreign Service cadre and a former Indian ambassador to Germany.

== Early life and education ==
Ambassador Singh finished his schooling at Mayo College, Ajmer and obtained his bachelor's degree in Politics at the St. Xaviers College, Kolkata. He is a Post Graduate in International Studies from the School of International Studies, Jawaharlal Nehru University, New Delhi.

== Indian Foreign Service ==
He is a 1980 batch officer of the Indian Foreign Service. He started his career in Diplomacy with a posting in Japan and has since been posted in Sri Lanka, Kenya and Italy.

== Positions held ==
- Ambassador of India to Germany
- Ambassador to Indonesia. Also concurrently Ambassador of India to ASEAN and Timor-Leste.
- Ambassador to Ethiopia and Representative of India to the African Union, UNECA and IGAD.
- Ambassador to Republic of Djibouti.
- Deputy Permanent Representative of India to UNEP and UN-HABITAT.

== Publications ==
He has authored five books:

- The Abalone Factor on India-Japan business relations. This book was awarded the Bimal Sanyal Award for Research by an Indian Foreign Service officer.
- The Injera and the Paratha on India and Ethiopia.
- Masala Bumbu on India-Indonesia relationship.
- A comic book called Travels through Time on India-Indonesia relationship.
- Opportunity Beckons: Adding Momentum to the Indo-German Partnership.

== See also ==
- Indian Ambassadors to the Federal Republic of Germany
