= Natarajan Krishnan =

Indian diplomat (1928–2020)

Permanent Representative of India to the United Nations
- In office April 1981 – September 1986
- Preceded by: Brijesh Mishra
- Succeeded by: Chinmaya Gharekhan

President of the United Nations Security Council
- In office February 1985 – March 1985

Personal details
- Born: 6 October 1928
- Died: 15 September 2020 (aged 91) Bangalore, India

Natarajan Krishnan (6 October 1928 – 15 September 2020) was an Indian diplomat and negotiator who served in many capacities including as Permanent Representative of India to the United Nations in New York from 1981 to 86 and the President of the United Nations Security Council in 1985. He also set up the 1987 Africa Fund as Prime Minister Rajiv Gandhi's Special Envoy and was India's representative on UNESCO's Executive Board.

== Biography and career ==
After graduating with a BA Honors in Economics from Presidency College, Madras, he stood first in the Union Public Service Commission Exam and joined the Indian Foreign Service on 17 July 1951. In a diplomatic career spanning more than three decades, he held several senior diplomatic positions, including: Ambassador and Permanent Representative to the UN, Geneva (1967-70); Ambassador to Yugoslavia and Greece (1976-79); Additional Secretary, Ministry of External Affairs (1979-81); Permanent Representative to the UN, New York (1981-86) and President of the UN Security Council in February 1985; and Chairman of the Coordinating Bureau of the Non-Aligned Countries (1983-86).

After retiring from the Indian Foreign Service in 1986, he was appointed as Special Envoy by Prime Minister Rajiv Gandhi to set up the Africa Fund to assist Southern African front-line states threatened by the apartheid South African government. Later, Mr Krishnan helped to found and became the first Dean of the School of International Studies at Pondicherry University . He was also nominated by the Indian government to represent India on UNESCO's Executive Board in Paris (1989-94). In later years, he was also called upon to serve in various capacities, including: as Special Envoy for special missions; member of the UN Secretary-General's Advisory Board on Disarmament (1995-98); member of the Commonwealth Expert Group on Small States (1997); and member of Commonwealth Election Observer Groups to Tanzania and Seychelles.

=== Role in Iran–Iraq War ===
When the war between Iran and Iraq broke out, the two countries failed to reach to peace deal. Mr Krishnan formulated a peace deal and conducted negotiations, and the two countries agreed to that formulation in October 1984.
