= Asoke Kumar Mukerji =

Indian diplomat and writer (born 1955)

Asoke Kumar Mukerji IFS (Retd.)

Permanent Representative of India to the United Nations
- In office April 2013 – December 2015
- Preceded by: Hardeep Singh Puri
- Succeeded by: Syed Akbaruddin

Special Secretary (Political issues) in Ministry of External Affairs at New Delhi
- In office February 2012 – March 2013

Additional Secretary (Foreign policy planning & review and International Organizations) in Ministry of External Affairs at New Delhi
- In office 2010–2012

Deputy High Commissioner of India to the United Kingdom
- In office 2007–2010
- Preceded by: Ranjan Mathai
- Succeeded by: Rajesh N Prasad

Personal details
- Born: December 1955 (age 70) Kolkata, India
- Occupation: Diplomat (IFS)

Asoke Kumar Mukerji (born December 1955) is a former Indian diplomat. He currently teaches diplomacy at the Diplo Foundation. He was a Permanent Representative of India to the United Nations from April 2013 to December 2015. In 2018, he was awarded a honorary Doctorate of Civil Law by the University of East Anglia (UK).

== Early life and education ==
Mukerji was educated at North Point School, Darjeeling and St. Stephen's College, Delhi.

== Diplomatic career ==
Mukerji qualified for the Indian Foreign Service, which he joined in July 1978.

His early diplomatic career took him to Belgrade and Washington DC. He became Consul General of India in Soviet Central Asia in June 1990, and helped transform India's relations with the five newly independent countries of Uzbekistan, Kazakhstan, Kyrgyzstan, Tajikistan and Turkmenistan during the momentous period of transition following the dissolution of the Soviet Union. From March 1992 to December 1992, he was India's first Charge d'affaires in Uzbekistan, Tajikistan and Turkmenistan.

Mukerji worked as a trade negotiator in the newly formed World Trade Organization between 1995 and 1998. He was among the first Indian officials tasked with representing India in trade disputes involving India brought before the WTO Dispute Settlement Mechanism. The WTO Dispute Settlement Body in its meeting on 21 October 1998 recognized his "knowledge of the WTO issues was unsurpassed" while approving his inclusion in the Indicative List of Panelists for Dispute Settlement. Mukerji's article "Developing Countries and the WTO: Issues of Implementation" published in 2000 has been widely used in the context of the Doha Development Round of trade negotiations.

He is credited with the formation of the first private-public partnership Indian Community Welfare Committee in the United Arab Emirates during his assignment as Consul General of India in Dubai (1998-2001). This platform, under the patronage of the Government of India, brought together stakeholders from the private sector, public undertakings, and individual civil society representatives, including women social workers, to deal with issues facing Indian nationals in distress.

Mukerji was India's Deputy Ambassador to the Russian Federation between 2001 and 2005. He was responsible for the implementation of projects inducting modern defence systems into the three wings of India's armed forces during his assignment, including the T-90 main battle tank, and the Su-30MKI fighter aircraft.

As India's Ambassador to Kazakhstan (2005-2007), Mukerji negotiated the acquisition of India's first Caspian Sea oilfield stake (Satpayev) in 2005 by the Indian Government-owned Oil and Natural Gas Corporation.

Between 2007 and 2010, Mukerji was India's Deputy High Commissioner to the United Kingdom in London, which is India's oldest and largest diplomatic mission.

Mukerji was responsible for India's foreign policy planning and review, participation in international organizations, border management, and cyber issues as Additional Secretary in the Ministry of External Affairs from 2010 to 2012. He headed the Government of India's multi-agency counter terrorism working groups with foreign countries, including with the five permanent members of the UN Security Council, and co-chaired the India-EU Security Dialogue. He led Indian delegations for dialogues on cyber issues with the United States, United Kingdom, Russia and Japan between 2011 and 2012.

He was Chairman of the South Asian Association for Regional Cooperation (SAARC) Steering Committee that established the South Asia Forum, tasked with implementing a South Asian Economic Union by the SAARC Summit in Maldives in 2011. He has worked closely with Indian and international think-tanks on foreign policy issues related to major transitions in India's immediate neighbourhood.

== At the United Nations ==
Mukerji spearheaded India's campaign in the United Nations General Assembly mandated Inter-Governmental Negotiations for expanding and reforming the United Nations Security Council, catalyzing the consensus United Nations General Assembly Decision 69/560 of 14 September 2015 adopting a text-based negotiation process after 23 years of discussions.

During United Nations negotiations on Agenda 2030, Mukerji advocated strongly for the greater use of technology, especially information and communication technology, to accelerate development. The outcome of the United Nations process on Financing for Development reflected the acceptance of this proposal by the establishment of a Technology Facilitation Mechanism.

The Review of the World Summit on the Information Society (WSIS) by the United Nations General Assembly endorsed accelerating the use of ICTs for development, including bridging the digital divides.

During a review in the United Nations on the future role of UN peacekeeping, Mukerji raised greater awareness of the need to recognize the value and role of troops sent by UN member states for peacekeeping operations. He projected the interests of India as a major troop-contributing country to United Nations peacekeeping operations.

In July 2014, the United Nations agreed, after protracted negotiations which had dragged on for almost ten years, to increase the monthly reimbursements to troops deployed on United Nations peacekeeping operations through a survey mechanism of troop contributing countries. Consequently, the rate reimbursed for each soldier deployed for UN peacekeeping rose from US$1028 per month to US$1332 per month, and would rise up to US$1410 per month by 2017.

India became the first UN troop contributing country to create a Virtual Wall in honor of her fallen UN peacekeepers, which was launched by Mukerji at the United Nations on 29 May 2015.

The proposal by India for the establishment of a Memorial Wall at the United Nations Headquarters to honor the more than 3,300 soldiers who have laid down their lives during UN peacekeeping operations was recommended by the Special Committee on Peacekeeping Operations in its report A/69/19 (Para 19), and adopted by the UN General Assembly in June 2015.

Participating in the Leaders' Summit on Peacekeeping on 28 September 2015, Prime Minister Modi called for this memorial wall to be created quickly, affirming India's readiness to contribute, including financially, towards this objective.

Mukerji crafted a successful campaign in the United Nations General Assembly to have a Resolution adopted by consensus to declare 21 June of every year as the International Day of Yoga, implementing a proposal made by Prime Minister Narendra Modi of India to the United Nations General Assembly on 27 September 2014. The Resolution moved by India attracted a record number of 177 co-sponsoring countries, and was tabled, negotiated and adopted between 27 September 2014 and 11 December 2014, making it one of the fastest initiatives of its kind to be implemented in the United Nations General Assembly. The United Nations commemoration of the First International day of Yoga was held outdoors on 21 June 2015 with the active participation of the UN Secretary General Ban ki-Moon, and beamed live for the thousands of yoga practitioners gathered at the iconic Times Square in the heart of Manhattan, symbolically linking the activities of the United Nations with the wider world.

In 2018, the United Nations office in India published a video oral history of Mukerji's assignment at the United Nations in New York.

== Public Speaking ==
During his diplomatic career, Mukerji has been a public speaker at the Universities of Cambridge, Oxford, Harvard, Columbia, Princeton, Rochester, Dartmouth College, at the London Conference on Cyberspace , the New Delhi Conference on Cyberspace (2017), and at the public commemoration of the 70th Anniversary in June 2015 of the signing of the UN Charter in San Francisco.

Cyberspace

He is an active participant in the evolving international discussion on cyberspace. In 2017, he chaired a National Security Council Secretariat-appointed committee to recommend how cyber norms for India's digital platforms can be formulated. In 2020, he spoke on India and the global governance of cyberspace, which was followed up by his call for an international convention on cyberspace. The EU's Cyber Direct platform carried his suggestions on India-EU cooperation in cyber diplomacy in June 2021. In 2025, he delivered the keynote address at the Geneva Dialogue on "Who shapes power in the digital age".

Indo-Pacific

Following the launch of the Indo-Pacific strategic framework by the United States in 2017, Mukerji has contributed ideas on India's role in the western Indo-Pacific, India-Japan collaboration in the Indo-Pacific, and prospects for the Quad in the Indo-Pacific. In January 2023, he was invited by the UK Parliament Foreign Affairs Committee to give oral evidence on the UK's "tilt to the Indo-Pacific". This was followed in October 2025 by the invitation from the UK Parliament's National Security Strategy's Joint Committee to give oral evidence on the Indo-Pacific and the UK's new national security strategy.

Central Asia

Mukerji is actively involved in writing and speaking on Central Asia. His monograph on "India and Central Asia" was published by the Nehru Memorial Museum and Library in 2017. He has focused on issues of connectivity between India and Central Asia as a major challenge for mutually benefical cooperation between the two sides.

United Nations

With his involvement in issues relating to multilateralism and the United Nations, Mukerji has called for reforming the United Nations by implementing Article 109 of the UN Charter. In 2017, he spoke of the role of the United Nations in the contemporary world. In 2018, he analysed the impact of multilateralism on India, elaborating on this in 2019 in the context of India's role for over a century as a founding member of multilateral institutions. Due to sharpening challenges to multilateral institutions, Mukerji has looked at the need to reform the United Nations, and the World Trade Organization.

Mukerji is a member of the International Institute of Strategic Studies, London. He writes for international and Indian peer-reviewed journals on international affairs.

== Works ==
Asoke Kumar Mukerji has published eight books.

- Stamped in Memory: a Postal History of Dubai 1909-1999
- India through the eyes of Russian Artists
- India House, London
- Mahatma Gandhi in London
- Valour and Sacrifice: the First Indian Soldiers in Europe 1914-1916
- Indian War Memorials of the First World War
- India and the United Nations: A Photo Journey 1945-2015
- Gallipoli Revisited (co-authored with Rana Chhina). Published by Indian Council of World Affairs, New Delhi, 2022. ISBN 9789384695156

== See also ==
- Asian Indians in the New York City metropolitan region
