= Mukta Dutta Tomar =

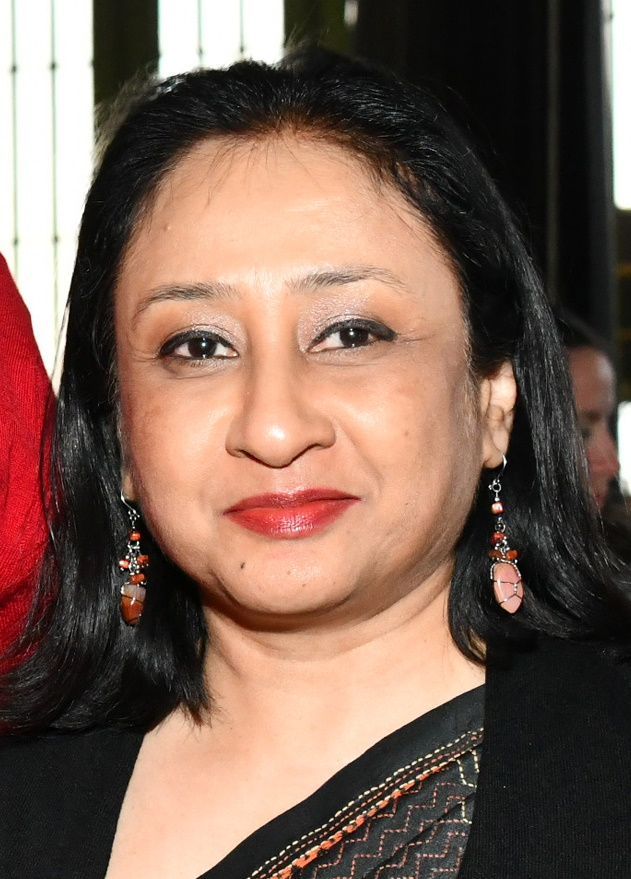
- Mukta Dutta Tomar in (2019)

Indian Ambassador to Germany
- In office April 2017 – June 2021
- Preceded by: Gurjit Singh
- Succeeded by: Parvathaneni Harish

Consul General of India, Chicago
- In office August 2010 – July 2013
- Preceded by: Ashok Kumar Attri
- Succeeded by: Ausaf Sayeed

Personal details
- Born: 4 June 1961 (age 65)
- Spouse: Ashok Tomar
- Education: University of Calcutta
- Occupation: IFS
- Profession: Civil Servant

Mukta Dutta Tomar (born 4 June 1961) is a retired Indian civil servant who belongs to the Indian Foreign Service cadre. She served as Indian Ambassador to Germany from year 2017 till 2021.

== Personal life ==
Mukta Dutta Tomar graduated from the University of Calcutta. She is married to Ashok Tomar, who is an Indian Foreign Service officer of the 1978 batch.

== Career ==
She joined the Indian Foreign Service in 1984. She has served in Indian missions at Madrid, Kathmandu, Paris and Yangon. She has served at the Permanent Mission of India to the United Nations at New York. She was India's Deputy High Commissioner to Bangladesh. She also functioned as the Consul General of India in Chicago from August 2010 to July 2013.

Mukta Dutta Tomar has also served as the Ministry of External Affairs in New Delhi in various Divisions such as the Americas Division and as Additional Secretary (Administration). She has also served as the Head of the Consular, Passport & Visa Division as well as the Investment, Technology Promotion & Economic Division.
