= Nirupam Sen (diplomat) =

Indian diplomat (1947–2017)

His Excellency Nirupam Sen IFS (Retd.)

Permanent Representative of India to the United Nations
- In office September 2004 – March 2009
- Preceded by: Vijay K. Nambiar
- Succeeded by: Hardeep Singh Puri

Personal details
- Born: c. 1947 Kolkata, West Bengal, India
- Died: 2 July 2017 (aged 69–70) New Delhi, India
- Occupation: Diplomat (IFS)

Nirupam Sen (1947 — 2 July 2017) was from the 1969 batch of the Indian Foreign Service. His last posting prior to retirement was as Permanent Representative of India to the United Nations. After retirement, he was appointed as Special Senior Adviser to the President of the UN General Assembly.

== Career ==
Sen presented his credentials as Permanent Representative of India to the United Nations on 17 September 2004. Prior to this appointment, Sen had been India's High Commissioner to Sri Lanka. He has previously headed Indian missions in Sofia and Oslo in Bulgaria and Norway. His predecessor as Permanent Representative of India to the United Nations was Vijay K. Nambiar and his successor was Hardeep Singh Puri.

== Death ==
Sen died in New Delhi on 2 July 2017 at the age of 70.
