= Ajit Gupte =

Ambassador of India to Germany

Ambassador of India to Germany
- Incumbent
- Assumed office 7 October 2024
- Appointed by: Appointments Committee of the Cabinet
- Preceded by: Parvathaneni Harish

Ambassador of India to Egypt
- In office 2021–2024
- Appointed by: Appointments Committee of the Cabinet
- Preceded by: Rahul Kulshreshth
- Succeeded by: Suresh K Reddy

Ambassador of India to the Denmark
- In office 2017–2021
- Appointed by: Appointments Committee of the Cabinet
- Preceded by: Rajeev Shahare
- Succeeded by: Pooja Kapur

Personal details
- Born: Ajit Gupte; 9 January 1967 (age 59) India
- Education: (B.Com) Sydenham College of Commerce and Economics; University of Mumbai
- Occupation: Diplomat

Ajit Vinayak Gupte (born 9 January 1967) is an Indian diplomat from the 1991 batch of the Indian Foreign Service who is currently serving as the Ambassador of India to Germany since October 2024. He previously served as an Ambassador of India to Egypt and Denmark.

== Diplomatic career ==
Gupte joined Indian Foreign Service in 1991 where he studied Chinese mandarin as a part of his assignment in the service. He served in various capacities with China serving as under secretary from 1995 to 1998, again during his postings in Hong Kong from 1998 to 2000 and then in Beijing from 2000 to 2004. He also served in Dhaka, Bangladesh as its first secretary or counsellor from 2004 to 2008. He then served as the deputy Director General of Indian Council For Cultural Relations from 2008 to 2010. Over the years he has held numerous incharges like serving in the Embassy of India, Berlin and serving it's Chargé d'affaires for nine months.

He was then appointed as Ambassador of India to Denmark in June 2017 where he served until 2021.

In 2021, Gupte was appointed as Ambassador of India to Egypt where he served until October 2024.

His tenure was marked by successful high level visits of leaders of both the countries where the Egyptian President Abdel Fattah El-Sisi visited India in Republic Day in January 2023 and visit of Indian Prime Minister Narendra Modi to Egypt in mid of 2023.

In October 2024, Gupte was appointed as the Ambassador of India to Germany.
