= Permanent Representative of India to the United Nations =

Permanent representatives to the UN

- Emblem of India

- Flag of India

- Incumbent; Parvathaneni Harish since 1 September 2024
- Style: His/Her Excellency
- Appointer: President of India
- Formation: 1947
- Website: www.pminewyork.org

The permanent representative of India to the United Nations is India's foremost diplomatic representative to the United Nations. The permanent representative (UN ambassador) is the head of the Permanent Mission of India to the United Nations in New York City.

The permanent representative of India to the UN is Parvathaneni Harish, who took charge of the post from September 1, 2024.

== List ==
This is a list of Indian permanent representative to the United Nations.

Name	Portrait	Entered office	Left office	Notes
Feroz Khan Noon		1945	1946	
Samar Sen		1946	1948	Permanent liaison officer to the UN
B. N. Rau	Postage stamp issued in honour of B. N. Rau.	March 1948	1952	Also representative to the United Nations Security Council (1950 to 1952); Judge of the International Court of Justice (1952–1953); President of the United Nations Security Council (June 1950 and March 1951)
Rajeshwar Dayal		1952	August 1954	
Arthur S. Lall		September 1954	December 1959	
Chandra Shekhar Jha		January 1959	1962	
B. N. Chakrvarthy		August 1962	July 1965	
G. Parthasarathy		August 1965	December 1968	Also served as the President of the United Nations Security Council (September 1967)
Samar Sen		January 1969	July 1974	Also served as the President of the United Nations Security Council (December 1972)
Rikhi Jaipal		July 1974	May 1979	Also served as the President of the United Nations Security Council (October 1977)
Brajesh Mishra		June 1979	March 1981	Served as the Principal Secretary to the Prime Minister of India (1998–2004); 1st National Security Advisor of India (1998–2004)
Natarajan Krishnan		April 1981	September 1986	Also served as the President of the United Nations Security Council (February 1985)
Chinmaya Rajaninath Gharekhan		October 1986	December 1992	Also served as the President of the United Nations Security Council (October 1991, December 1992); Also served as the President of the United Nations Economic and Social Council (1990)
Mohammad Hamid Ansari		January 1993	January 1995	Later also served as Vice President of India from 2007 to 2017
Prakash Shah		February 1995	July 1997	
Kamalesh Sharma		August 1997	May 2002	Served as the 5th Secretary-General of the Commonwealth of Nations (2008–2016)
Vijay K. Nambiar		May 2002	May 2004	Served as the Special Advisor to the Secretary General of the United Nations (2006); Chef de Cabinet of the United Nations (2007–2012)
Nirupam Sen		September 2004	March 2009	
Hardeep Singh Puri		May 2009	February 2013	Currently serving as Minister in the Ministry of Petroleum and Natural Gas and Ministry of Housing and Urban Affairs; formerly served as Minister of State (Independent charge) in the Ministry of Civil Aviation (2019–2021) and as Minister of state in the Ministry of Commerce and Industry (2019–2021)
Asoke Kumar Mukerji		April 2013	December 2015	
Syed Akbaruddin		January 2016	April 2020	
T. S. Tirumurti		May 2020	June 2022	Also served as the President of the United Nations Security Council (August 2021)
Ruchira Kamboj		August 2022	31 May 2024	Also served as the President of the United Nations Security Council (December 2022); First female appointed as the Permanent Representative of India to the United Nations
Parvathaneni Harish		September 2024	Incumbent	

== See also ==
- India and the United Nations
- Official Spokesperson of the Ministry of External Affairs (India)
- List of current permanent representatives to the United Nations
- Foreign relations of India
- Diplomatic missions of India
