= T. S. Tirumurti =

Former Indian diplomat

His Excellency T. S. Tirumurti
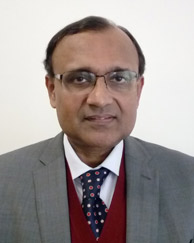
- Tirumurti in 2018

Permanent Representative of India to the United Nations
- In office 19 May 2020 – 30 June 2022
- President: Ram Nath Kovind
- Preceded by: Syed Akbaruddin
- Succeeded by: Ruchira Kamboj

Secretary (Economic Relations) in the Ministry of External Affairs
- In office 5 February 2018 – 30 April 2020
- Preceded by: Vijay Keshav Gokhale
- Succeeded by: Rahul Chhabra

High Commissioner of India to Malaysia
- In office 20 December 2013 – 4 February 2018
- Preceded by: Vijay Keshav Gokhale
- Succeeded by: Mridul Kumar

1st Representative of India to the State of Palestine
- In office 1 January 1996 – 1 January 1998
- Preceded by: Position established
- Succeeded by: P. Harish

President of the United Nations Security Council
- In office August 2021 — September 2021

Personal details
- Born: 7 March 1962 (age 64) Coimbatore, Tamil Nadu, India
- Spouse: Gowri Tirumurti
- Relatives: Ramanathan Krishnan (Father in-law)
- Education: (BCom) Vivekananda College; University of Madras (LLB) Faculty of Law, University of Delhi
- Occupation: Diplomat
- Profession: Civil Servant

T. S. Tirumurti (born 7 March 1962) is a retired Indian diplomat from the 1985 batch of the Indian Foreign Service. He served as the Secretary to Government of India in the Ministry of External Affairs of India and later as Permanent Representative of India to the United Nations in New York. It was then India became a non-permanent member of the UN Security Council for the 8th time. He was also the President of the UN Security Council for August 2021.

After his retirement from the Indian Foreign Service, Tirumurti has been appointed as Distinguished Professor in Indian Institute of Technology Madras in Chennai. He is also a member of the Board of Governors of the Dhirubhai Ambani Institute of Information and Communication Technology, Gandhinagar.

== Personal life ==
Tirumurti was born in Coimbatore. He completed his schooling at the Vidya Mandir, Chennai. He secured his Bachelor of Commerce degree from Ramakrishna Mission Vivekananda College, Chennai of the University of Madras. The teachings of Swami Vivekananda, Sri Ramakrishna and the Holy Mother have since guided him in his life. He subsequently completed his LL.B. (Bachelor of Laws) from Campus Law Centre, Faculty of Law, University of Delhi in 1985. He is the grandson of Dr. T. S. Tirumurti who was the Principal of Stanley Medical College, Chennai and Vice-Chancellor of Andhra University.

He is married to Gowri Tirumurti and they have two children - a daughter and a son. Tirumurti's wife Gowri is the daughter of the retired tennis player Ramanathan Krishnan. Gowri was the Indian National Juniors Champion in 1982 and competed in French Open Juniors. She is currently a Partner in an Intellectual Property Law firm, Delhi. Their son Vishwajit and daughter Bhavani are also tennis players.

== Career ==
Ambassador T. S. Tirumurti joined the Indian Foreign Service in 1985. He served in Indian diplomatic missions in Cairo, Geneva, Gaza, Washington, D.C., Jakarta and Kuala Lumpur. He has served at the Ministry of External Affairs, Government of India in New Delhi as Under Secretary (Bhutan), Director (Foreign Secretary's Office), Joint Secretary (Bangladesh, Sri Lanka, Myanmar and Maldives) as well as Joint Secretary (United Nations Economic and Social Division).

Tirumurti was the first Representative of India to the Palestinian National Authority. He was the Deputy Chief of Mission in Jakarta and the Indian High Commissioner to Malaysia. He served as Secretary of Economic Relations in the Ministry of External Affairs, India, handling the Economic Relations portfolio (which included, inter alia, the Gulf and the Arab World, Africa, and India's Development Partnership).

=== United Nations ===
On 19 May 2020, he took over as the Permanent Representative of India to the United Nations succeeding Syed Akbaruddin.

While he was Permanent Representative to the United Nations, India was elected to the UN Security Council in July 2020. India entered the UN Security Council for a two-year term on 1 January 2021. India was also elected to the UN Commission on the Status of Women (CSW) for 2021-2025 and the Advisory Committee on Administrative and Budgetary Questions (ACABQ) for the term 2021–2023.

He served as the Chair of the UN Security Council's Taliban Sanctions Committee (also called as 1988 sanctions committee), Libya Sanctions Committee (also called as 1970 Sanctions committee) in 2021-2022 and the Chair of the Counter-Terrorism Committee in 2022.

In accordance with the monthly rotation policy, he was President of the UN Security Council for August 2021. An important resolution passed under his presidency was the UN Security Council Resolution (UNSCR) 2593 on Afghanistan (passed on 31 August), which took into account "collective concerns" in particular on terrorism, where it has noted the "commitment of the Taliban not to allow the use of the Afghan soil for terrorism, including from terrorists and terrorist groups designated under resolution 1267." It was important since it was the first resolution to be passed after the Taliban announced its government in Afghanistan.

In December, after several decades, for the first time India voted against the United Nations Security Council's draft resolution on Climate Change and Security. Tirumurti underlined that UNSC was not the forum for discussion on climate, and called the resolution a motivated attempt to evade responsibility from the appropriate forum. India felt strongly that climate change should be dealt within UNFCCC where all countries of the world participate in the decision making on climate change.

After Russia invaded Ukraine in 2022, Tirumurti explained India's abstentions from the UN Security Council vote after Russia militarily intervened in Ukraine. Out of the Council's 15 members, 11 voted in favor, 1 (Russia itself) voted against, and 3 (China, India, and the United Arab Emirates) abstained; the resolution thus failed due to Russia's use of its veto power.

Again in May 2022, Tirumurti was in the news when he replied to a tweet by the Ambassador of the Netherlands to the UK and Northern Ireland who stated that India should not have abstained from voting in the UN General Assembly's session on Ukraine. In the tweet, the Dutch envoy, Karel van Oosterom, said to Mr Tirumurti "You should not have abstained in the GA. Respect the UN Charter." He replied saying "Kindly don't patronize us Ambassador, we know what to do".

=== Environment and Climate Change ===
Tirumurti has been a negotiator for climate change for several years, right from his stint in Geneva with the Permanent Mission of India to the UN (1993) and later as Joint Secretary and Head of Division of UN on economic and social matters at Headquarters. Along with the Ambassador Burhan Gafoor of Singapore, he is credited with coining the term “Nationally Determined Contribution” at the Warsaw Conference of Parties of Climate Change in 2013. He has handled various environment-related issues, including biodiversity, desertification etc. He was also in charge of the International Solar Alliance as Secretary in the Ministry and helped organize its first meeting in New Delhi in 2018. Along with 9 other countries cutting across regions, Tirumurti drafted and read out an important statement on “Global Net Zero” at the UN during World Environment Day in June 2022.

== Publications ==
Tirumurti has authored the following books-

- Kissing the Heavens: The Kailash - Manasarovar Yatra (1999)
- Clive Avenue (2002)
- Chennaivaasi (2012)
