= Syed Akbaruddin =

Indian diplomat (born 1960)

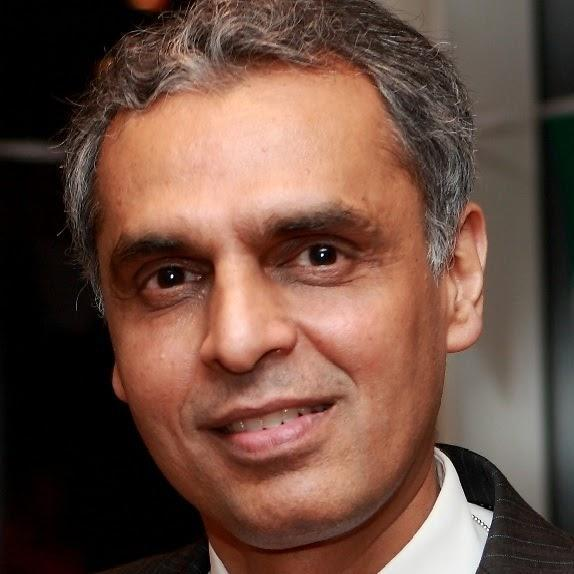

Permanent Representative of India to the United Nations
- In office 1 January 2016 – 19 May 2020
- President: Pranab Mukherjee; Ram Nath Kovind
- Preceded by: Asoke Kumar Mukerji
- Succeeded by: T. S. Tirumurti

Official Spokesperson of the Ministry of External Affairs
- In office 7 December 2011 – 18 April 2015 Serving with Vishnu Prakash (7 Dec 2011 – 7 Jan 2012)
- Preceded by: Vishnu Prakash
- Succeeded by: Vikas Swarup

Personal details
- Born: 27 April 1960 (age 66) Hyderabad, Telangana, India
- Spouse: Padma Akbaruddin
- Children: 2
- Occupation: Civil Servant (IFS)

Syed Akbaruddin (born 27 April 1960) is a retired Indian diplomat from 1985 batch of the Indian Foreign Service and served as India's permanent representative at the United Nations at New York from January 2016 to April 2020. He had previously served as official spokesperson of India's Ministry of External Affairs from January 2012 to April 2015 and was Indian representative at IAEA from 2006 to 2011. He is currently serving as the dean of Kautilya School of Public Policy.

== Career ==
Akbaruddin is a 1985 batch Indian Foreign Service officer. In his distinguished career spanning over 34 years, Akbaruddin has served in different capacities in India and abroad, starting his first foreign assignment in Cairo where he also learned Arabic. He also served twice in Saudi Arabia; in Riyadh from 1988 to 1992 and in Jeddah from 2000 to 2004 as consul-general of India and he is rightly considered an expert on the West Asia issues in India. At the International Atomic Energy Agency in Vienna, he was on deputation for four years and returned to India in 2011. He was the director at the Foreign Secretary's Office of the Ministry from 2004 to 2005.

Akbaruddin was the official spokesperson of the Ministry of External Affairs of India from January 2012 to April 2015 and was succeeded by Vikas Swarup. He headed the External Publicity and Public Diplomacy division of the Ministry in the capacity of Joint Secretary to Government of India. He was also the chief coordinator for the India-Africa Summit in October 2015. He was later Additional Secretary in the Ministry from April 2015 to September 2015. In November 2015, Akbaruddin was appointed as India's permanent representative to the United Nations, succeeding Asoke Kumar Mukerji.

== PR to the UN ==
Akbaruddin presented his credentials to UN Secretary-General Ban Ki-moon on 25 January 2016. He has been praised inside his country and abroad for his exceptional skills at multilateral forums, protecting India's interest and setting new standards of multilateral diplomacy. His work at the United Nations against terrorism, climate change and towards international peace has been unparalleled to any of his predecessors. He has been credited for blacklisting of Jaish-e-Mohammed chief Masood Azhar as a global terrorist by the UN Security Council. On the climate front, Akbaruddin has presented India as leader and not a follower at the United Nations, by setting examples such as the inauguration of a 50-kilowatt 'Gandhi Solar Park' by Prime Minister Narendra Modi was a first of its kind effort by India at the UN. India's strong commitment to UN SDGs has been acknowledged by the top UN officials also that UN Development Programme Administrator Achim Steiner says that he is simply in awe of how India is proceeding on its fascinating journey towards meeting its SDGs.

== Personal life ==
Syed Akbaruddin was born in Hyderabad, Andhra Pradesh (Now Telangana State) on 27 April 1960 to Professor Syed Bashiruddin, formerly the head of the Department of Journalism and Communication at Osmania University, who headed the department for many years and served as Indian ambassador to Qatar, vice-chancellor of Dr B R Ambedkar Open University and director of the research wing of the Film and Television Institute of India in Pune, and Prof. (Dr.) Zeba Bashiruddin, who was a Professor in the English department at Sri Sathya Sai University, Prasanthi Nilayam campus. She had also authored 2 books on Sathya Sai Baba.

Syed Akbaruddin studied at Hyderabad Public School. He holds a Master's Degree in Politics and International Relations.

== See also ==
- Natwar Singh
- Vijay Keshav Gokhale
- Harsh Vardhan Shringla
- Indians in New York

Diplomatic posts
Preceded by Asoke K Mukerji	Spokesperson, Ministry of External Affairs; 2011–2015	Succeeded by Vikas Swarup
Preceded by Asoke K Mukerji	Permanent Representative of India to the United Nations; 2016-2020	Succeeded by T. S. Tirumurti
