= Khub Chand =

Indian diplomat

Ambassador of India to Germany
- In office 1967 - 1970
- Preceded by: S K. Banerjee
- Succeeded by: Kewal Singh Choudhary

Ambassador of India to Sweden
- In office Aug. 1962 to Jan 1966
- Preceded by: Kewal Singh Choudhary
- Succeeded by: B.K.Kapur

High Commissioner of India to Ghana
- In office 1960-1962

Ambassador of India to Italy
- In office 1957 - 1960
- Preceded by: John Thivy

Personal details
- Born: December 16, 1911
- Died: June 12, 2003 (aged 91)
- Education: Oriel College, Oxford

Khub Chand was an Indian diplomat.

== Early life and education ==
He was born on December 16, 1911.

He was educated at Delhi University, and later went on to attend Oriel College, Oxford.

== Career ==
Between 1957 and 1960 he was the ambassador to Italy. In 196, he was made the Indian envoy to Ghana, concurrently serving in Nigeria as well.

Between 1962 and 1966, he was the Indian envoy to Sweden, concurrently serving as the envoy to Finland as well.
