= Vijay K. Nambiar =

Indian diplomat

Chef de Cabinet of the United Nations
- In office 1 January 2007 – February 2012
- Preceded by: Mark Malloch Brown
- Succeeded by: Susana Malcorra

Special Advisor to the Secretary General of the United Nations
- In office 4 January 2006 – 31 December 2006

Permanent Representative of India to the United Nations
- In office May 2002 – June 2004
- Preceded by: Kamalesh Sharma
- Succeeded by: Nirupam Sen

Ambassador of India to Pakistan
- In office August 2000 – December 2001

Personal details
- Born: August 1943 (age 83) Poona, British India
- Relatives: Satish Nambiar (brother)
- Education: University of Bombay

Chenicheri Vijay Nambiar (born August 1943) is a retired Indian diplomat and served as the UN Secretary General's Special Advisor on Myanmar. He was Chef de Cabinet (Chief of Staff) under UN Secretary-General Ban Ki-moon from 1 January 2007 to February 2012. He held the rank of Under-Secretary-General and was a member of the Secretary-General's Senior Management Team. Mr. Nambiar previously served as Deputy National Security Advisor to the Government of India and Head of the National Security Council Secretariat. He previously served as India’s Permanent Representative to the United Nations in New York (May 2002-June 2004). Earlier as Ambassador of India, he served successively in Pakistan (2000-2001), China (1996-2000), Malaysia (1993-1996), and Afghanistan (1990-1992). He was earlier Ambassador of India in Algeria (1985-1988).

During the course of his professional career in the Indian Foreign Service, he had served in numerous bilateral and multilateral appointments in Beijing, Belgrade and New York during the 1970s and 1980s. He was Joint Secretary (Director General) handling East Asia in 1988 during the period of the historic visit of Indian Prime Minister Rajiv Gandhi to China. He also dealt with multilateral affairs at the headquarters in New Delhi during the early 1980s. He was involved at the delegation level in numerous UN and non-aligned summit and ministerial conferences since 1979.

== Early life and career ==
Vijay Nambiar was born in August 1943. He is a member of the Chenicheri family, and is originally from Kannur, Kerala, India. He is also the younger brother of Lt.Gen. Satish Nambiar.

Mr. Nambiar joined the Indian Foreign Service in 1967 and spent his early years in the diplomatic service specializing in the Chinese language serving in Hong Kong and Beijing. He also served during the mid-1970s in Belgrade, Yugoslavia.

Mr. Nambiar was born in Poona, India, in August 1943. He holds a post-graduate degree in political science from Bombay University and was awarded the Chancellor’s Gold Medal of the University in 1965.

He is married and has two daughters.
