= Samar Sen (diplomat) =

Indian diplomat (1914–2003)

1st and 8th Permanent Representative of India to the United Nations
- In office January 1969 – June 1974
- Preceded by: Gopalaswami Parthasarathy
- Succeeded by: Rikhi Jaipal
- In office 1946–1948
- Preceded by: Position established
- Succeeded by: B. N. Rau

2nd High Commissioner of India to Bangladesh
- In office June 1974 – November 1976
- Preceded by: Subimal Dutt
- Succeeded by: K. P. S. Menon

President of the United Nations Security Council
- In office 1972–1973
- Preceded by: Jeanne Martin Cissé
- Succeeded by: Chaidir Anwar Sani

Chairperson of the Group of 77
- In office 1970–1971

7th High Commissioner of India to Pakistan
- In office 1968–1969
- Preceded by: Kewal Singh Choudhary
- Succeeded by: B. K. Acharya

7th High Commissioner of India to Australia
- In office 1960–1963

Personal details
- Born: 10 August 1914 Dacca, Bengal Presidency, British India (now Dhaka, Bangladesh)
- Died: 16 February 2003 (aged 88) London, United Kingdom
- Spouse: Sheila Malhotra
- Children: Jupiter Sen, Julius Sen, Ariana Grimes, Sevaly Sen
- Education: University of Oxford

Samar Sen (10 August 1914 – 16 February 2003) was an Indian diplomat who served as the 1st permanent representative of India to the United Nations, Geneva, 8th in New York and the 2nd high commissioner of India to Bangladesh from June 1974 to November 1976.

Born in Dacca, British India (in modern-day Dhaka, Bangladesh), Sen obtained his education from the University of Calcutta, the University of London, Oxford, and Lincoln's Inn. He was a civil services officer who served as a president of the United Nations Security Council from 1972 to 73.

== Career ==
Sen served in the government of India at various posts, including under secretary, and deputy secretary. From 1946 to 48, he represented India at the United Nations as a liaison officer. He also served as chairperson of the International Commission of Control and Supervision besides serving as ambassador to Algeria and Lebanon, and high commissioner to Australia, New Zealand, and Pakistan. In the Government of India, he also served as joint secretary in the Ministry of External Affairs from 1957 to 1959.

During his foreign services, he served as president of the United Nations Administrative Tribunal and chairperson of the G77.

== Personal life ==
Sen married Sheila Lal Malhotra, daughter of Sardari Lal Malhotra (owner of Marina Hotel in Delhi's Connaught Place) and Vera Swan. Sen and Malhotra had four children - sound editor and sound designer Jupiter Sen, economist Julius Sen, Ariana Grimes (née Sen) and economist Sevaly Sen.

Sheila's sister Tina Angela Lal married British athletics coach Peter Coe with whom she had four children including Sebastian Coe.

== Assassination attempt ==
Following the assassination of Sheikh Mujibur Rahman on 15 August 1975, the new Bangladeshi President Khondaker Mostaq Ahmad wanted to form a confederation with Pakistan. On 18 August 1975, Samar Sen, then Indian High Commissioner to Bangladesh, was reported to read out to Mostaq Ahmad the contents of a slip of paper in his possession, which stated: "If the name of the People's Republic of Bangladesh is changed and a confederation is made with any country, then under the valid treaty, the Indian Army will take appropriate action. But if you refrain from changing the name and the idea of a so-called confederation, India will consider whatever happens from 15 August onwards as Bangladesh’s internal matter." On hearing this, Mostaq Ahmad became dejected and announced against the formation of a confederation with Pakistan.

However, this led to Sen being the target of an assassination attempt on 26 November 1975. The attackers had posed as his visitors in civilian clothes. He received several injuries and suffered a broken shoulder bone, but the bullet was removed after a surgery in Dhaka hospital. During retaliation his security guards killed four of the six attackers. An Indian Air Force plane was sent but he chose to remain in Dhaka and continued as India's High Commissioner there for the next year until he was appointed as high commissioner to Pakistan.

== Sources ==
- "Welcome to Permanent Mission of India to the UN, New York". Welcome to Permanent Mission of India to the UN, New York. 15 July 2015.
- "High Commission of India, Canberra, Australia : Previous High Commissioners". hcicanberra.gov.in.
- "Welcome to High Commission of India Dhaka, Bangladesh". Welcome to High Commission of India, Bangladesh (in Bengali).
- "Welcome to Permanent Mission of India in Geneva". Welcome to Permanent Mission of India in Geneva.
- "Presidents (1970-1979) : Security Council (SC) : United Nations (UN)". United Nations. 18 October 2012. Archived from the original on 18 October 2012.
- Alikhan, Anvar (2 January 2017). "Sebastian Malhotra Coe: The little-known Punjabi connection of an English Olympic legend". Scroll.in.
- "Welcome to High Commission of India Islamabad Pakistan". Welcome to High Commission of India, Islamabad, Pakistan. 28 December 2020.
