= Satish Nambiar =

Recipient of Vir Chakra

Satish Nambiar VrC
- Born: Chenicheri Satish Nambiar; 30 August 1936 (age 90); Bombay, Bombay Presidency, British India
- Spouse: Indira
- Relatives: Brother - Vijay Nambiar; Daughter – Rekha; Son – Rajesh
- Military career
- Allegiance: India
- Branch: Indian Army
- Service years: 1956–1994
- Rank: Lieutenant General
- Service number: IC-10018
- Unit: Maratha Light Infantry
- Conflicts: Indo-Pakistan War of 1965; Indo-Pakistan War of 1971; Yugoslav Wars
- Awards: Padma Bhushan; PVSM; AVSM; Vir Chakra
- Other work: Distinguished Fellow of IDSA

Lieutenant General Chenicheri Satish Nambiar VrC is a retired Indian general. He was the first Force Commander and Head of Mission of UNPROFOR, the United Nations Protection Force in the former Yugoslavia during 1992–1993. He is the elder brother of former UN Under-Secretary-General Vijay Nambiar.

== Early life ==
Lt Gen Nambiar was born in Bombay (now Mumbai) on 30 August 1936, to Kunhananthan Nambiar and Chenicheri Devikutty in a Nambiar Nair family. He was educated mostly in Poona (present-day Pune) and Bombay, and is an alumnus of St. Xavier's College, Bombay. He was an Under Officer with the National Cadet Corps, and joined the 20th regular course of the Indian Military Academy.

== Military career ==
During 1977-1979, Nambiar was a part of the Indian Army Training team in Iraq. During 1983-1987, he worked as a Military Adviser at the High Commission of India, London.

He also worked as the Director General of Military Operations in India. He was the first Force Commander and Head of Mission of the United Nations forces in Yugoslavia. He retired as the Deputy Chief of the Army Staff (India) in 1994.

== After retirement ==
After his retirement, Nambiar worked as a researcher and author on topics related to war, defence strategy and international relations. He served on the United Nations High Level Panel on "Threats, Challenges and Change", which provided basis for the UN Secretary General's report to the 2005 World Summit. Since 2011, he is a distinguished fellow of the Institute for Defence Studies and Analyses, New Delhi.

== Awards ==
- Vir Chakra, for Operation Cactus-Lilly (1971)
- Padma Bhushan, 2009

=== Military Decorations ===

Param Vishisht Seva Medal	Ati Vishisht Seva Medal		Vir Chakra	General Service Medal
Samar Seva Medal	Poorvi Star	Paschimi Star	Raksha Medal	
Sangram Medal	Sainya Seva Medal	High Altitude Service Medal	Videsh Seva Medal	
25th Anniversary of Independence Medal	30 Years Long Service Medal	20 Years Long Service Medal	9 Years Long Service Medal	

== Bibliography ==
- Satish Nambiar; Chandar S. Sundaram; Rana Chhina (2009). For the Honour of India: A History of Indian Peacekeeping. Centre for Armed Forces Historical Research, United Service Institution of India. ISBN 978-81-902097-8-6.
- UN High-level Panel on Threats, Challenges, and Change (2004). A More Secure World: Our Shared Responsibility : Report of the High-level Panel on Threats, Challenges, and Change. United Nations Publications. ISBN 978-92-1-100958-3.

Military offices
Preceded by First Appointee	Commander UNPROFOR; 1992–1993	Succeeded by Lieutenant General Lars-Eric Wahlgren (Sweden)
