= Kailash Narain Haksar =

Indian politician

Colonel Sir Kailash Narain Haksar CIE (20 February 1878 – 1953, Calcutta), also spelled Kailas Narayan Haksar, was Minister of the princely state of Jammu and Kashmir from 1942 to 1944, and a former minister in Gwalior State.

He was the son of Har Narain Haksar and grandson of Rai Bahadur Dharam Narain Haksar CIE. He was appointed a Companion of the Order of the Indian Empire in 1911 and knighted in 1933.
