= Arthur S. Lall =

Indian diplomat (1911–1998)

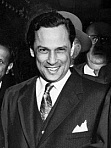

4th Permanent Representative of India to the United Nations
- In office September 1954 – December 1958
- Prime Minister: Jawaharlal Nehru
- Preceded by: Rajeshwar Dayal
- Succeeded by: Chandra Shekhar Jha

Personal details
- Born: 1911 Lahore, British India
- Died: 13 September 1998 (aged 86–87) New York, US
- Education: University of Oxford

Arthur Samuel Lall (1911 – 13 September 1998) was an Indian diplomat, writer, and anti-nuclear activist who served as a consul general of India and the 4th permanent representative of India to the United Nations from September 1954 to December 1958. He also represented the country at the Eighteen Nation Committee on Disarmament in 1962.

Best known for his role to involve the newly independent India in the International affairs, he also wrote several books on politics such as The UN and the Middle East crisis, 1967 and The Emergence of Modern India besides writing novels and poems.

== Biography ==
Lal was born in Lahore, British India into a Christian family. After the Indian subcontinent partitioned into two sovereign states, his family moved from Lahore, Pakistan to India. His brother John S. Lall was appointed dewan of the Kingdom of Sikkim. Lal obtained his education from the University of the Punjab, Lahore and the University of Oxford.

Prior to his diplomatic career, he was a government official in New Delhi and the first trade commissioner of India in London. An opponent of the nuclear weapons and testing, he saw India's first nuclear test in May 1974.

He was actively involved in the Strategic Arms Limitation Talks between the United States and the Soviet Union during his diplomatic career. After retiring from the service, he moved to Manhattan where he taught international relations at the School of International and Public Affairs, Columbia University.

=== Writing career ===
As a writer, he wrote several books, including poetry and novels. In 1967 he wrote two books such as the Modern International Negotiations: Principles and Practices and How China Negotiates. He wrote his last book The Emergence of Modern India in 1981. Besides writing on politics and the international relations, he also wrote fiction. He wrote a novel in 1956 titled The House at Adampur and Seasons of Jupiter in 1958.
