= Embassy of India, Berlin =

Embassy of India in Berlin
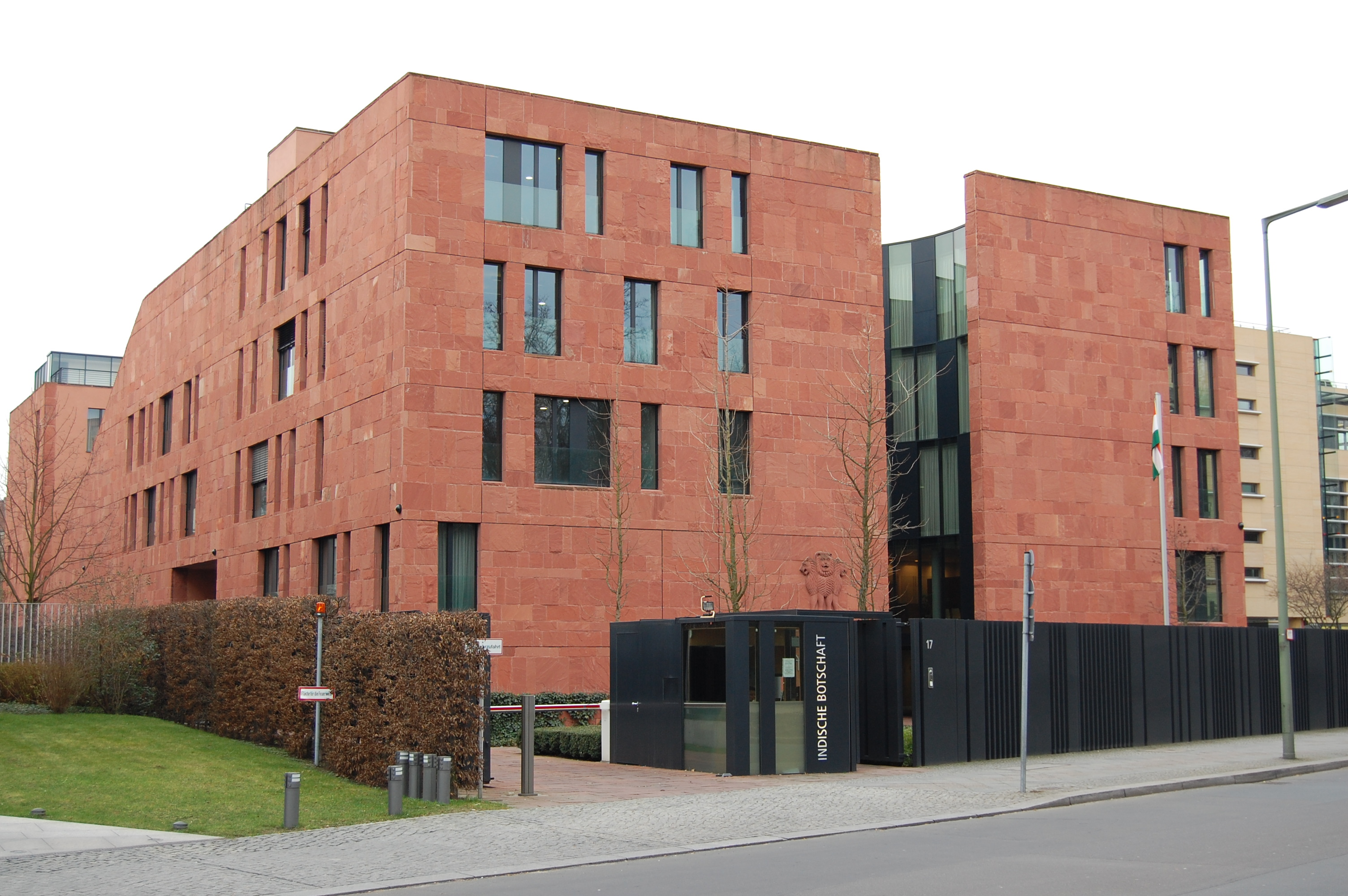
- Location: Mitte, Berlin
- Address: Tiergartenstraße 17, 10785 Berlin
- Coordinates: 52.509444°N 13.362111°E
- Ambassador: Ajit Gupte
- Website: indianembassyberlin.gov.in

The Embassy of India, Berlin (German: Indische Botschaft in Berlin) is the diplomatic representation of the Republic of India in the Federal Republic of Germany. The embassy building has been located in Tiergartenstraße in Berlin's embassy district since 2001. The first exchange of ambassadors between West Germany and India took place in 1952, after India was one of the first countries to recognize the then new Federal Republic of Germany in 1949. On March 7, 1951, both countries concluded a treaty to exchange ambassadors. Between 1972 and 1990 there was also an Indian embassy in the GDR (East Germany).

== History ==
Until the German government decided to move from Bonn to Berlin, India's embassy in Germany was based in Bonn.

Diplomatic relations also existed with the GDR between 1972 and 1990. The Embassy of India in the GDR was located at Clara-Zetkin-Straße 89 (since 1995 Dorotheenstraße again) in East Berlin.

Between 1999 and 2001, the new headquarters of the Indian embassy in Germany was built in the embassy quarter of Berlin's Tiergarten quarter (Berlin-Mitte borough). The building plans were drawn up by the Berlin architects Léon-Wohlhage-Wernik. The finished building is characterized by its unusual colour scheme - the façade is made of Indian red sandstone.

On January 18, 2001, the Indian Embassy was officially opened in the presence of the then Foreign Ministers of Germany and India - Joschka Fischer and Jaswant Singh. The first Indian ambassador to move into the new building was Ronen Sen.

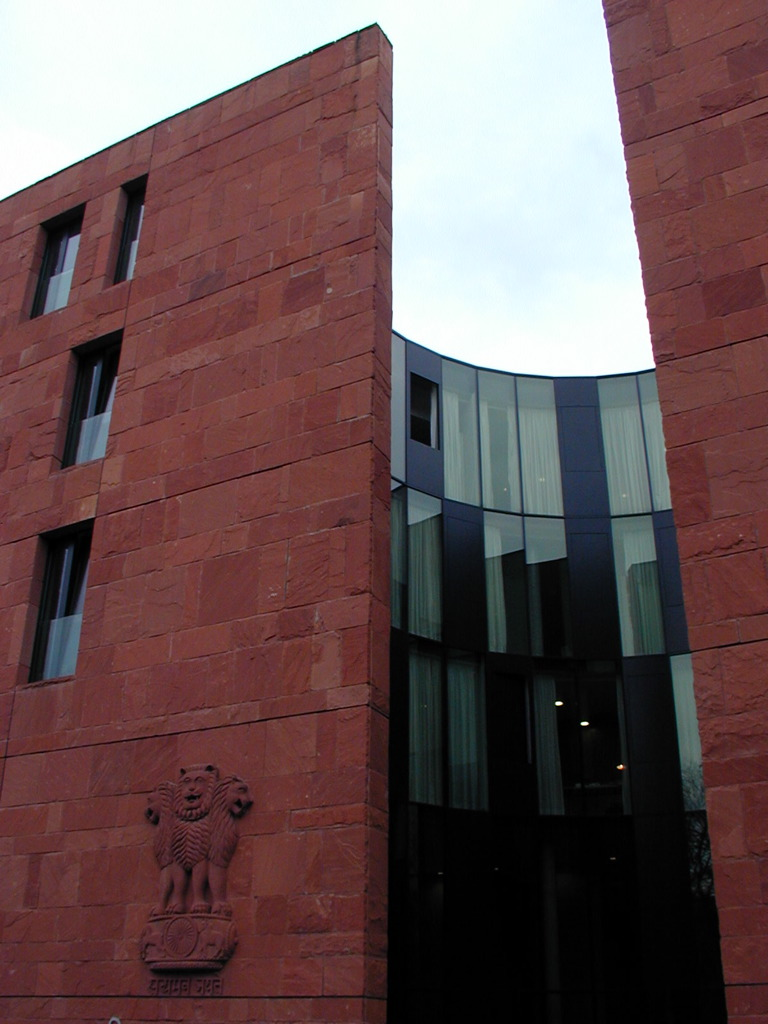
View of the entrance

== See also ==
- List of diplomatic missions of India
- Germany–India relations

== Literature ==
- Nils Ballhausen: Ein Stück Indien – Botschaft der Republik Indien mit Konsulats- und Wohngebäude. In: Bauwelt, Nr. 14/2001, p. 18–23.
