= Harish Parvathaneni =

Permanent Representative of India to UN in New York

Harish Parvathaneni IFS

24th Permanent Representative of India to the United Nations
- Incumbent
- Assumed office 1 September 2024
- Prime Minister: Narendra Modi
- Preceded by: Ruchira Kamboj

Ambassador of India to Germany
- In office 2021–2024
- Preceded by: Mukta Dutta Tomar
- Succeeded by: Ajit Gupte

Ambassador of India to Vietnam
- In office 2016–2019
- Preceded by: Preeti Saran
- Succeeded by: Pranay Kumar Verma

Ambassador of India to Palestine
- In office 1998–2000

Personal details
- Born: 7 April 1968 (age 58) India
- Children: 2
- Education: Osmania University (M.Tech); IIM Calcutta
- Occupation: diplomat

Harish Parvathaneni is an Indian diplomat from the 1990 batch of Indian Foreign Service who is serving as Permanent Representative of India to United Nations in New York since 1 September 2024. He previously served as an Ambassador of India to Germany from 2021 until 2024 and Ambassador of India to Vietnam from 2016 to 2019.

== Education ==
Harish graduated as a gold medalist in mechanical engineering at Osmania University College of Engineering in Hyderabad and previously studied at the Indian Institute of Management in Kolkata. He also studied Arabic at the American University of Cairo and passed the exam with distinction.

== Early career ==
Harish joined the Indian Foreign Service (IFS) in 1990. He worked in Indian Embassy in Cairo (Egypt) and Riyadh (Saudi Arabia), and was India's representative to the Palestinian Authority. He also worked for the Ministry of External Affairs's East Asia and External Publicity divisions.

Harish served as joint secretary and officer on special duty to India's Vice President Mohammad Hamid Ansari for a period of five years, beginning in 2007. He served as India's Consul General in Houston from July 2012 till March 2016. Thereafter, Harish was India's ambassador to Vietnam (2016–2019) and during his tenure the bilateral relationship was upgraded to a Comprehensive Strategic Partnership. Most recently, Harish served as India's ambassador to Germany. During his tenure, both countries initiated a Green and Sustainable Development Partnership covering the government, business and industry.
