= Bhaswati Mukherjee =

Indian diplomat

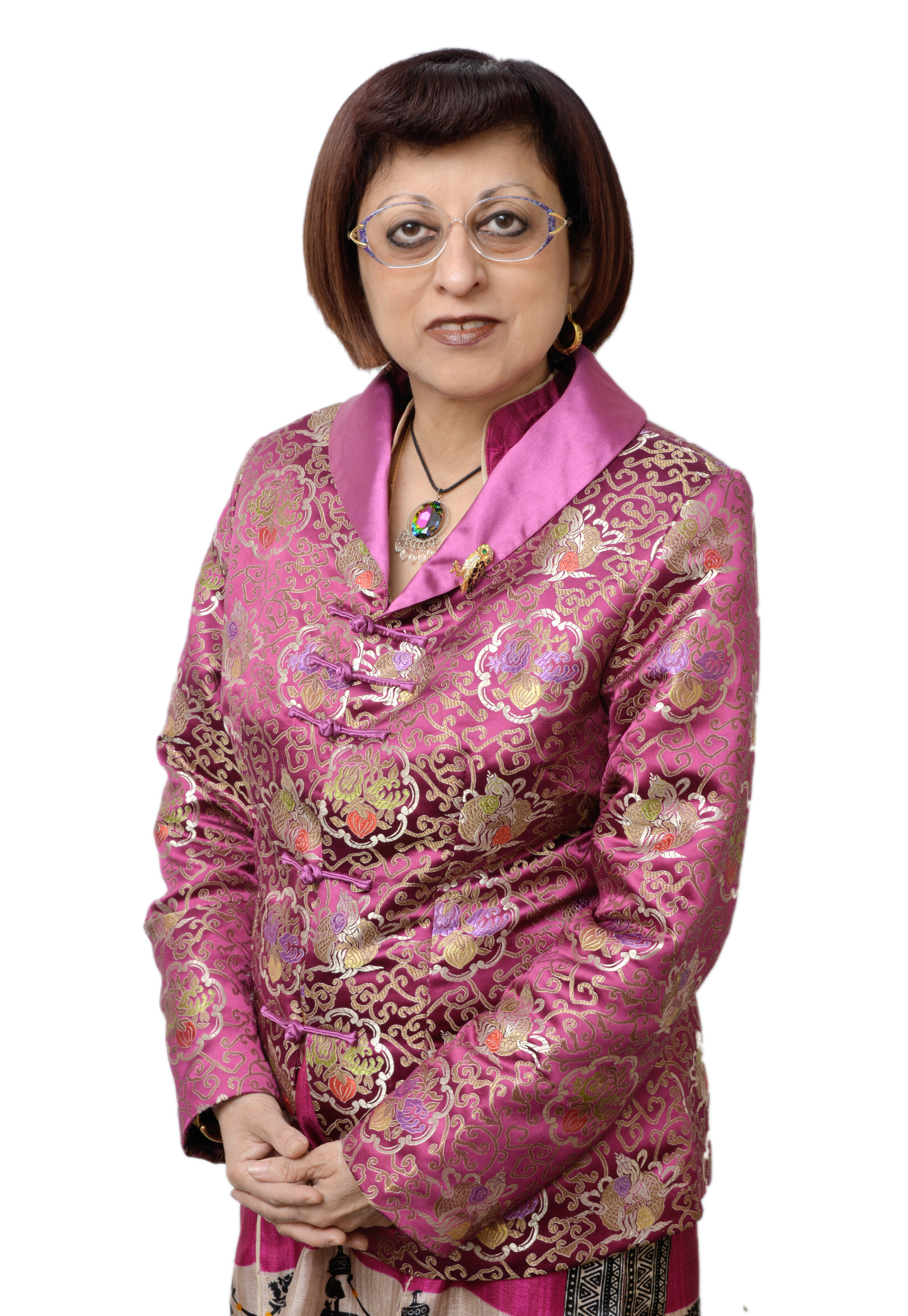
Bhaswati Mukherjee

Bhaswati Mukherjee (/bʰɑːsvət̪iː/) is a retired Indian diplomat. She is an active commentator on international affairs.

== Early life ==
Mukherjee earned a bachelor's degree in history from Miranda College and a master's degree in history from Delhi University. She earned a degree in French language and civilization from the University of the Sorbonne in Paris.

== Career ==
Mukherjee joined the Indian Foreign Service in 1976. While she headed the Indian Foreign Ministry’s department specialising in European Union affairs (1998 to 2004), she piloted institutional initiatives such as annual Indo-EU summits. She writes and speaks about developments in the European Union. In 2018, she published India and EU - An Insider's view.

She was Ambassador of India to the Netherlands from 2010 to 2013. Mukherjee was the Permanent Delegate of India to UNESCO from 2004 to 2010. She continues to comment on cultural heritage and education.

From 1986 to 1989 she worked at India’s Permanent Mission to the United Nations and 6 years as Chief of Staff to the United Nations Human Rights Commissioner (1991 to 1997).

She has successfully published several books, namely, 'India and EU: An Insider's view', 'Bengal and its parititon: An untold story', and the most recent, 'The indentured and their route'.

She works towards bringing light to the plight of the forgotten children of India viz., the indentured labours. In 2023, she also became the first female to be appointed as the President of India Habitat Centre in almost 3 decades.

Mukherjee lectures at the Foreign Service Institute and in different Universities in India and overseas - on issues ranging from foreign policy, disarmament and strategic affairs.
