= Embassy of India, Kathmandu =

Diplomatic mission of India to Nepal

- Address: Kapurdhara Marg 336, Kathmandu 44600, Nepal
- Coordinates: 27.7214932°N 85.3156914°E
- Ambassador: Naveen Srivastava
- Jurisdiction: Nepal
- Website: Official website

The Embassy of India in Kathmandu is the diplomatic mission of the Republic of India to the Federal Democratic Republic of Nepal.

== Ambassador ==
List of Ambassadors to Nepal
Sr. No.	Name of the Ambassador	Date of joining	Date of relinquishment
1	Surijit Singh Majithia	1947	1949
2	C. P. Narayan Singh	1949	1952
3	B.K Gokhale	1952	1954
4	Bhagwan Sahay	1954	1959
5	Harishwar Dayal	1 February 1960	19 May 1964
6	Shriman Narayan	20 November 1964	17 December 1967
7	Raj Bahadur	5 January 1968	22 January 1971
8	L. P. Singh	22 January 1971	5 September 1973
9	M. K. Rasgotra	8 December 1973	17 October 1976
10	N. B. Menon	28 November 1976	31 March 1979
11	N. P. Jain	30 June 1979	28 July 1982
12	H. C. Sarin	30 January 1983	31 January 1986
13	A. R. Deo	24 February 1986	31 December 1989
14	S. K. Sinha	20 February 1990	2 January 1991
15	Bimal Prasad	20 January 1991	31 January 1995
16	K. V. Rajan	15 March 1995	13 June 2000
17	Deb Mukherji	14 June 2000	30 November 2001
18	I. P. Singh	1 December 2001	17 August 2002
19	Shyam Saran	31 October 2002	25 July 2004
20	S. S. Mukherjee	6 October 2004	23 April 2008
21	Rakesh Sood	25 April 2008	11 August 2011
22	Jayant Prasad	25 August 2011	25 August 2013
23	Ranjit Rae	2 September 2013	28 February 2017
24	Manjeev Singh Puri	25 March 2017	31 December 2019
25	Vinay Mohan Kwatra	1 March 2020	16 April 2022
26	Naveen Srivastava	25 June 2022	Incumbent

== Swami Vivekananda Cultural Centre ==
The embassy operates the Indian Council for Cultural Relations's Swami Vivekananda Cultural Centre in Kathmandu. It was established in 2008 to promote cultural ties between India and Nepal.

== B. P. Koirala India - Nepal Foundation ==
The B. P. Koirala India - Nepal Foundation (BPKF) is affiliated with the Indian Embassy in Kathmandu. It was established in 1991 in the memory of B. P. Koirala to promote cultural exchanges between India and Nepal. The office of the foundation is located inside the Embassy of India.

== Nepal Bharat Library ==
Nepal Bharat Library or more generally called the Indian Library is run by the Indian Embassy in Kathmandu, Nepal. The library was called Nepal-Bharat Sanskritik Kendra until 2005. The library was established in 1951 after India set up the diplomatic relations with Nepal on 13 June 1947 with the aim of enhancing and strengthening cultural relations and information exchange between India and Nepal. It is the first foreign library in Nepal.

== See also ==
- Nepal–India relations
- Foreign relations of India
- Foreign relations of Nepal
- List of diplomatic missions in Nepal
- List of diplomatic missions of India
