= Pradeep Rawat =

Pradeep Rawat may refer to:

- Pradeep Kumar Rawat (born 1966), Indian diplomat
- Pradeep Rawat (politician) (born 1956), Indian politician
- Pradeep Rawat (actor) (1952–2026), Indian actor
