= Vikram Doraiswami =

Indian diplomat (born 1969)

His Excellency Vikram Doraiswami IFS
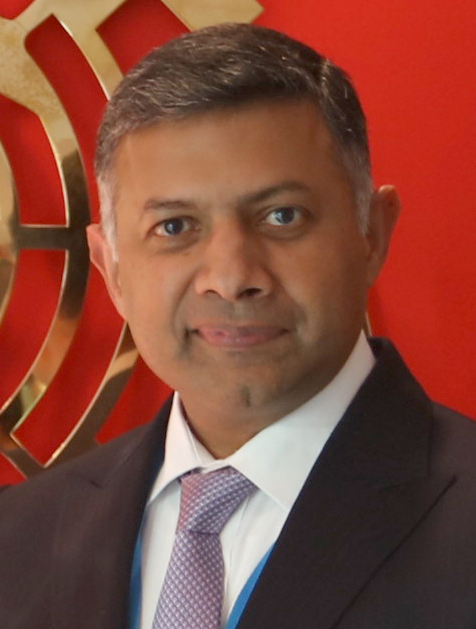

Ambassador of India to China
- Incumbent
- Assumed office 19 March 2026
- President: Droupadi Murmu
- Prime Minister: Narendra Modi
- Preceded by: Pradeep Kumar Rawat

High Commissioner of India to the United Kingdom
- In office 22 September 2022 – 18 March 2026
- President: Droupadi Murmu
- Prime Minister: Narendra Modi
- Preceded by: Gaitri Issar Kumar
- Succeeded by: Periasamy Kumaran

High Commissioner of India to Bangladesh
- In office October 2020 – September 2022
- President: Ram Nath Kovind
- Prime Minister: Narendra Modi
- Preceded by: Riva Ganguly Das
- Succeeded by: Pranay Kumar Verma

Ambassador of India to the Republic of Korea
- In office April 2015 – July 2018
- President: Pranab Mukherjee
- Prime Minister: Narendra Modi
- Preceded by: Vishnu Prakash
- Succeeded by: Sripriya Ranganathan

Ambassador of India to Uzbekistan
- In office October 2014 – March 2015
- President: Pranab Mukherjee
- Prime Minister: Narendra Modi
- Preceded by: A. Gitesh Sarma
- Succeeded by: Vinod Kumar

Personal details
- Born: 11 July 1969 (age 57)
- Spouse: Sangeeta Doraiswami
- Children: 1
- Education: University of Delhi (M.A.)
- Occupation: Indian Foreign Service
- Profession: Diplomat
- Rank: Secretary

Vikram Kumar Doraiswami (born 11 July 1969) is an Indian diplomat of Indian Foreign Service (IFS) who is currently serving as the Ambassador of India to China. Prior to this appointment, he was the High Commissioner of India to the United Kingdom, the High Commissioner of India to Bangladesh and as the Indian Ambassador to Republic of Korea and Uzbekistan.

== Early life and education ==
Doraiswami was born to a Tamil family. His father was an Indian Air Force officer who fought in the Bangladesh Liberation war, a country to which Doraiswami eventually became High Commissioner. He studied in schools all over India before eventually acquiring undergrad and graduate degrees in History at St. Stephen's College, University of Delhi. He worked for a year as a journalist at Business Today magazine while sitting for the Civil Services exam.

== Diplomatic career ==
He joined the Indian Foreign Service as part of the 1992 batch. After his training completed from the LBSNAA and FSI, he was posted to the Commission of India in Hong Kong in May 1994 as Third Secretary. He studied Mandarin by taking an elective diploma at the New Asia Yale-in-Asia Language School of the Chinese University of Hong Kong. In September 1996, he was assigned to the Embassy of India in Beijing, where he served for almost four years.

After returning to the Ministry of External Affairs in New Delhi in 2000, Mr. Doraiswami was appointed Deputy Chief of Protocol (Ceremonials). He served in this role for two years before being seconded to the Prime Minister’s Office in 2002, where he later held the position of Private Secretary to the Prime Minister of India Atal Bihari Vajpayee and later Manmohan Singh.

In 2006, Mr. Doraiswami was posted to the Permanent Mission of India to the United Nations in New York as Political Counsellor. In October 2009, he was appointed Consul General of India in Johannesburg, South Africa. In July 2011, he returned to the MEA in New Delhi as Head of the Division for the SAARC, a position he held until early October 2012. During this time, he also served as Coordinator for the Fourth BRICS Summit in New Delhi in March 2012. From October 2012 to October 2014, he was Joint Secretary of the Americas Division of the MEA.

=== Ambassador of India to Uzbekistan ===
He was appointed Ambassador of India to Uzbekistan in October 2014.

=== Ambassador of India to South Korea ===
On 13 April 2015, he was appointed as the Ambassador of India to South Korea in Seoul.

=== High Commissioner of India to Bangladesh ===
He has served as High Commissioner of India to Bangladesh. During his tenure, the Prime Minister of Bangladesh made a state visit to India from 5–8 September 2022, Sheikh Hasina and Prime Minister of India Narendra Modi signed a MoU on water sharing of the Kushiyara River, marking the first water-sharing agreement between the two countries since the Ganges Water Sharing Treaty of 1996. The two leaders also agreed to initiate negotiations for a CEPA to strengthen bilateral trade. The visit further emphasized improving transport and connectivity between India and Bangladesh, including railway enhancements and the development of sub-regional and trilateral highway projects involving India-Myanmar-Thailand connectivity.

=== High Commissioner of India to the United Kingdom ===
In December 2022, Vikram Doraiswami presented his credentials as High Commissioner of India to the United Kingdom to Charles III at Buckingham Palace, becoming the first Indian envoy to be received by the King following the death of Elizabeth II.

Following the Pahalgam Terror attack in 2025, an interview by Doraiswami with Yalda Hakim on Sky News gained widespread attention, during which he discussed issues related to How Pakistan Armed Forces is sponsoring terrorism against India and in the world.

During his tenure, Doraiswami also contributed to advancing bilateral trade and economic relations between India and the United Kingdom. These efforts culminated in the conclusion of a India–United Kingdom Comprehensive Economic and Trade Agreement between the two countries aimed at strengthening economic and commercial cooperation.

=== Ambassador of India to China ===
On 19 March 2026, Doraiswami was appointed as the next ambassador to the People's Republic of China.

== Personal life ==
He is married to Sangeeta Doraiswami and they have one son. Vikram Doraiswami's interests include reading, sports, fitness, travel and Jazz. He speaks Chinese, some French and Korean.
