= Vinay Mohan Kwatra =

Indian diplomat (born 1962)

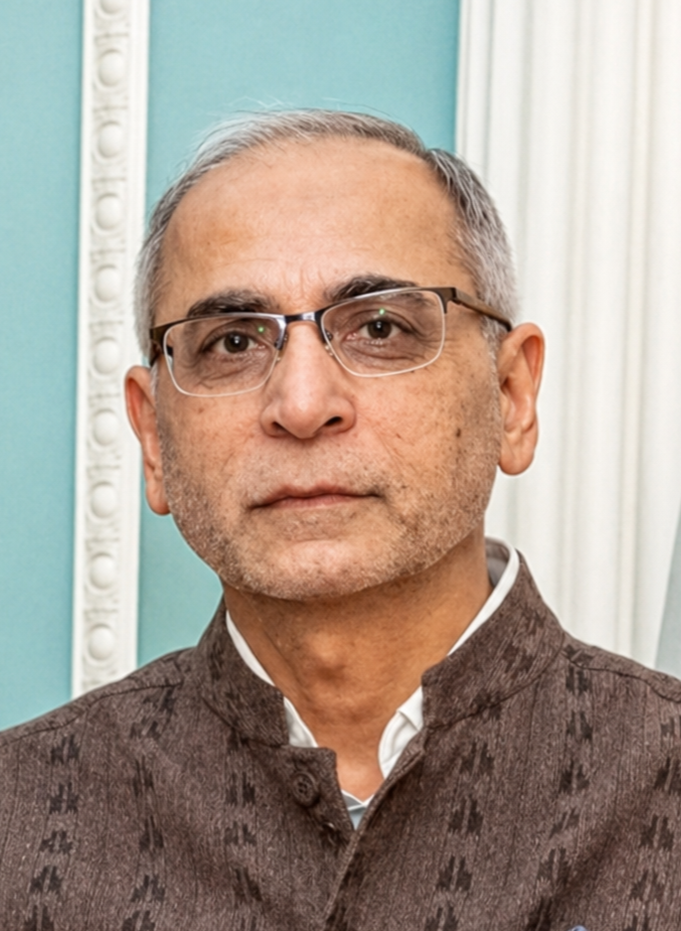
- Kwatra in August 2024

29th Ambassador of India to the United States
- Incumbent
- Assumed office 12 August 2024
- President: Droupadi Murmu
- Preceded by: Taranjit Singh Sandhu

34th Foreign Secretary of India
- In office 1 May 2022 – 14 July 2024
- Prime Minister: Narendra Modi
- Minister: S. Jaishankar
- Preceded by: Harsh Vardhan Shringla
- Succeeded by: Vikram Misri

25th Ambassador of India to Nepal
- In office March 2020 – April 2022
- Preceded by: Manjeev Singh Puri
- Succeeded by: Naveen Srivastava

24th Ambassador of India to France
- In office July 2017 – February 2020
- Preceded by: Dr. Mohan Kumar
- Succeeded by: Jawed Ashraf

Personal details
- Born: 15 December 1962 (age 63) India
- Spouse: Pooja Kwatra
- Children: 2 sons
- Education: M.Sc
- Alma mater: G. B. Pant University of Agriculture and Technology; Graduate Institute of International and Development Studies
- Occupation: Indian Foreign Service
- Profession: Diplomat
- Rank: Secretary

Vinay Mohan Kwatra (born 15 December 1962) is an Indian diplomat of Indian Foreign Service (IFS) who served as the 34th Foreign Secretary of India, from May 2022 until July 2024 and is currently serving as Ambassador of India to the United States. Previously, he has served as the Ambassador of India to France and Nepal.

== Early life and education ==
Vinay Mohan Kwatra was born on 15 December 1962. He holds the degree of B.Sc. and M.Sc. in Agriculture and Animal Husbandry from G. B. Pant University of Agriculture and Technology. He has also obtained a diploma in International Relations from the Graduate Institute of International and Development Studies.

== Diplomatic Career ==
=== Training and Posting in Switzerland ===
After clearing the UPSC CSE examination, Kwatra joined the Indian Foreign Service (IFS) in 1988. Between 1988 and 1990, he completed the foundation course at LBSNAA and underwent professional diplomatic training at FSI. He was subsequently posted as Third Secretary to the Permanent Mission of India in Geneva, Switzerland where he also completed his French language training. Upon his promotion to Second Secretary, he handled responsibilities related to specialized United Nations agencies and the Human Rights Commission until 1993.

=== MEA Headquarters and Overseas Assignments (1993–2003) ===
Vinay subsequently served as a Desk Officer at MEA Headquarters in New Delhi, where he coordinated with the United Nations. He later held assignments as Second Secretary, First Secretary and later as Counsellor in diplomatic missions in Tashkent, Uzbekistan, Durban, South Africa and Karachi, Pakistan between 1993 and 2003.

=== Deputy Chief of Mission in China ===
From 2003 to 2006, he served as Counsellor and was later appointed as the Deputy Chief of Mission at the Embassy of India in Beijing, China.

=== SAARC Secretariat in Nepal ===
From 2006 to 2010, he served at the SAARC Secretariat in Kathmandu, Nepal as Director and later as a Joint Secretary.

=== Counsellor in United States ===
From May 2010 to July 2013, he led the Commercial Wing at the Embassy of India in Washington, D.C. as a Counsellor, where he was responsible for advancing India’s trade and economic engagement with the United States of America.

=== Ministry of External Affairs, New Delhi ===
From July 2013 to October 2015, Vinay headed the Policy Planning & Research Division of the Ministry of External Affairs of India and subsequently served as the head of the Americas Division in the MEA, overseeing India’s relations with the United States and Canada.

=== Joint Secretary in Prime Minister's Office ===
Ambassador Kwatra served as Joint Secretary in the Prime Minister's Office to the Prime Minister Narendra Modi from 2015 to 2017. During this period, he later got empanelled to the rank of Additional Secretary.

=== Ambassador of India to France & Monaco ===
Kwatra was appointed as the Ambassador of India to France & Monaco and the Permanent Representative of India to UNESCO, serving from August 2017 to February 2020. During this period, he focused on streamlining the visa process for Indian students studying in France and expediting the arrival of the first batch of Rafale jets. He later got empanelled to the rank of Secretary.

=== Ambassador of India to Nepal ===
In January 2020, Kwatra was appointed as the Ambassador of India to Nepal. During this time period, Covid-19 happened in which on behalf of the Government of India, 23 tonnes of medicines were formally handed over to Bhanu Bhakta Dhakal, Minister for Health and Population of Nepal. The consignment, presented as a gift from the people of India to the people of Nepal, comprised 8.25 lakh doses of essential medicines, including 3.2 lakh doses of Paracetamol and 2.5 lakh doses of Hydroxychloroquine, more than 30,000 kits of RT-PCR and Covaxin under the Vaccine Maitri initiative.

=== Foreign Secretary of India ===
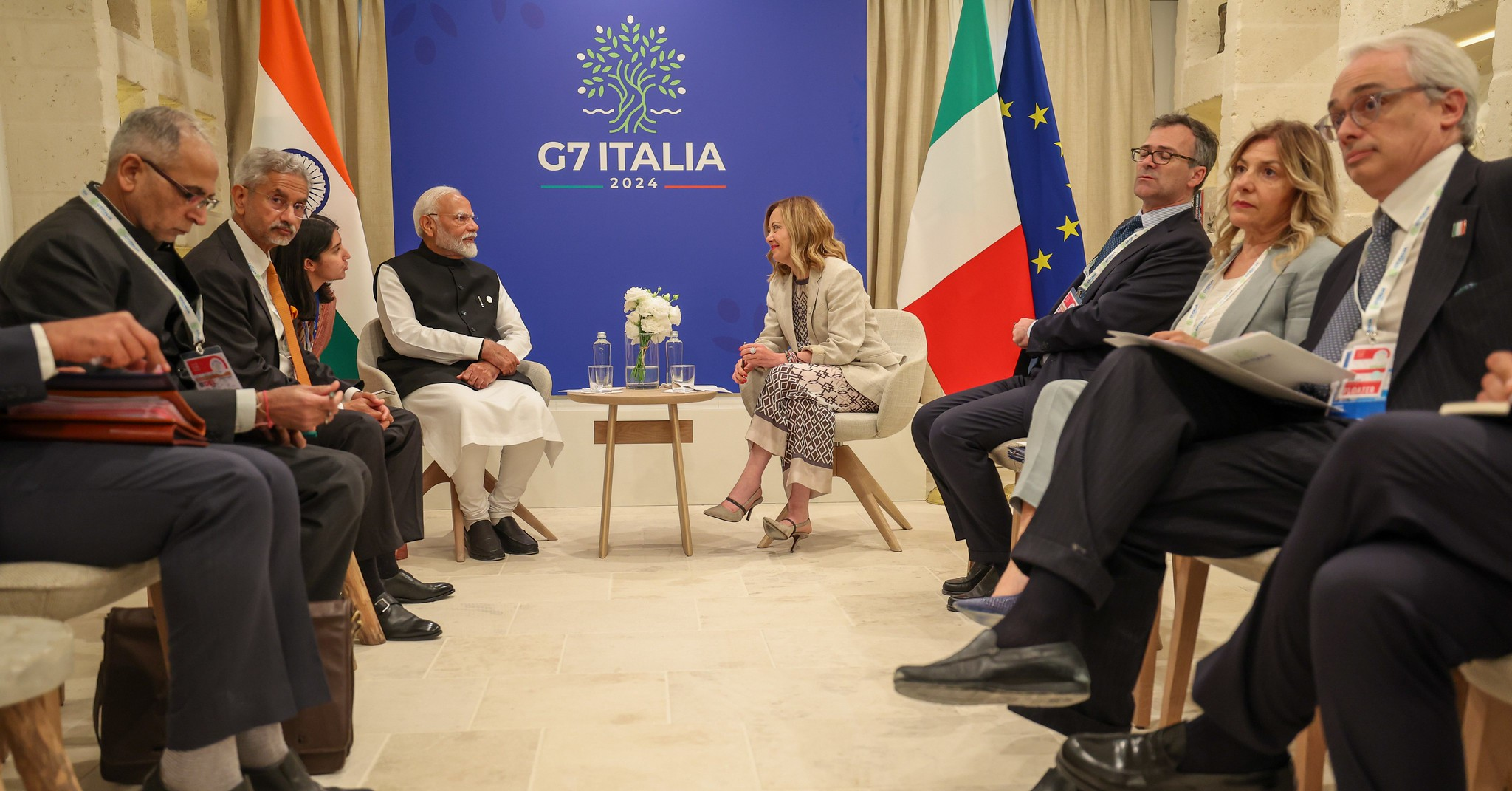
Prime Minister Shri Narendra Modi along with External Affairs Minister S. Jaishankar and Foreign Secretary Vinay Mohan Kwatra met H.E. Ms. Giorgia Meloni, Prime Minister of Italy on the sidelines of the 50th G7 summit in Apulia, Italy on 14 June 2024

On 4 April 2022, it was announced that Mr. Kwatra would succeed Harsh Vardhan Shringla as the Foreign Secretary of India following Shringla’s superannuation on 30 April 2022, just a few months before his own retirement. He is among the relatively few Indian Foreign Service officers who joined the service at a comparatively later age of 26 and rose to the position of Foreign Secretary, reflecting an distinguished career in diplomacy. During his engagements, Foreign Secretary Kwatra discussed regional strategic developments and India’s security concerns in light of border tensions with China since 2020, with a focus on their broader implications for regional stability.

=== Ambassador to the United States ===
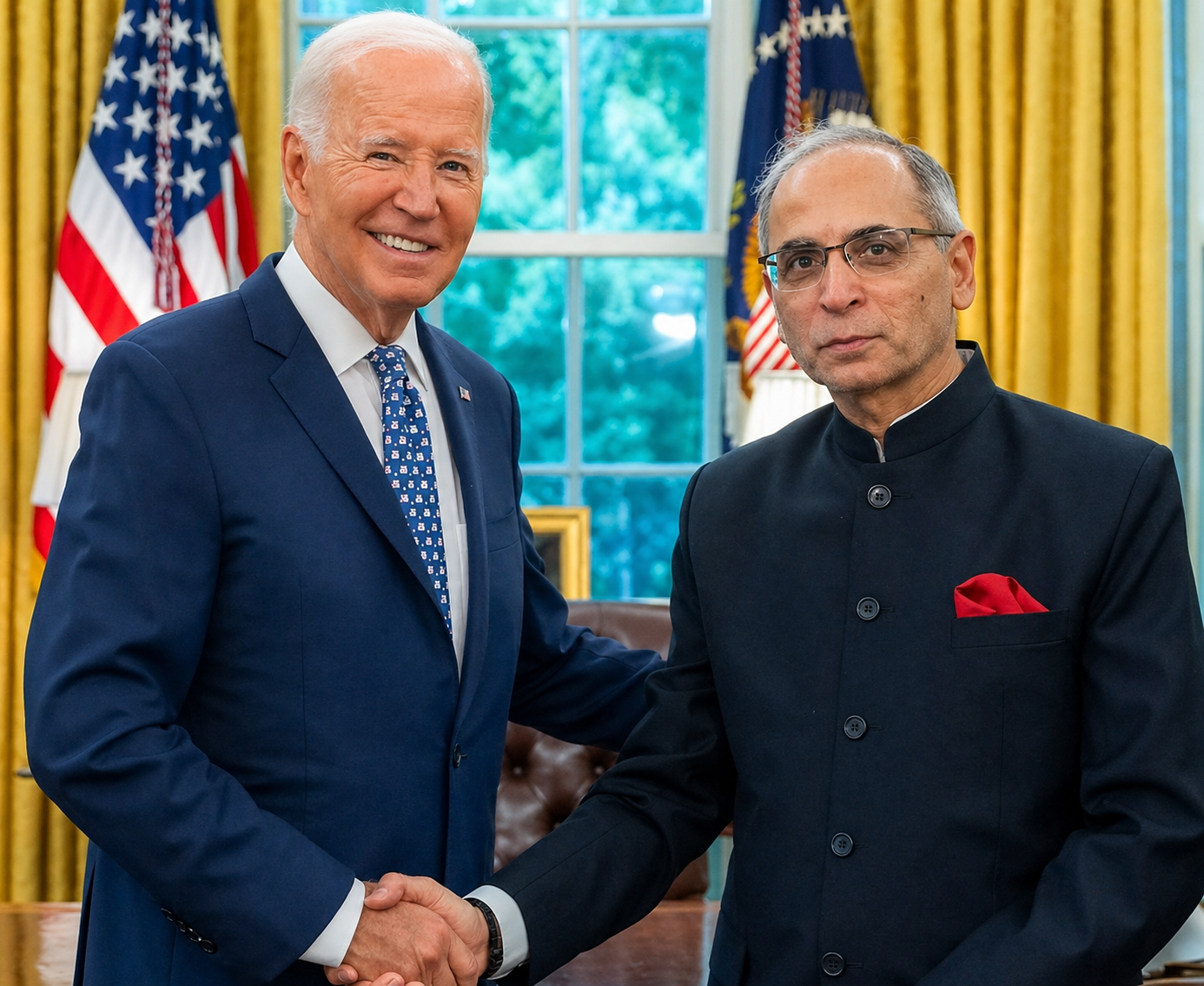
Ambassador Vinay Kwatra was honoured to present his credentials to the President of the US, Joe Biden as Ambassador of India to the United States on September 18. 2024

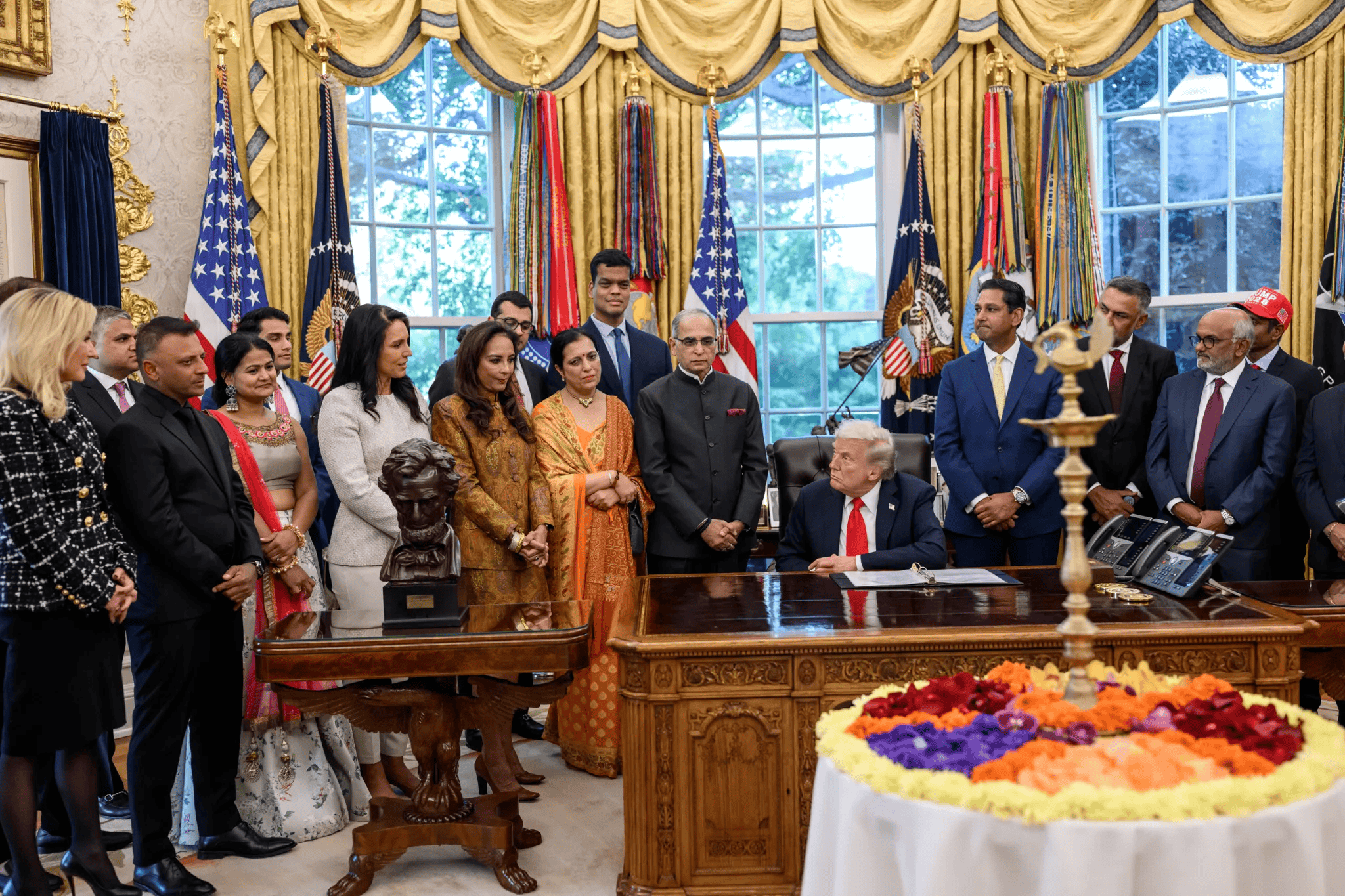
President Donald Trump celebrated Diwali with the Indian Diplomats and officials of the US Government in the White House

On 12 August 2024, Kwatra succeeded Taranjit Singh Sandhu as the Ambassador of India to the United States of America. During his tenure, Donald Trump assumed office as the 47th President of the United States. The Ambassador, together with officials of the Embassy, focused on strengthening bilateral relations between India and the United States. Subsequently, following the 2025 Pahalgam terrorist attack, India carried out Operation Sindoor against Pakistan. Although hostilities later ceased, the cessation was not formally confirmed by the Government of India, amid reports of pressure from the United States, particularly President Trump. In an interview with CNN, he referred to the perpetrators of the attack and Pakistan-sponsored terrorism in strongly critical terms, describing them as "lowlifes" and "subhuman monsters", which drew widespread attention.

Thereafter, the United States imposed a 25% tariff along with an additional 25% penalty tariff on India, citing its purchase of Russian oil. New regulatory measures concerning H-1B visas were also introduced, adversely affecting Indian professionals working in the United States.

While PM Modi maintained a firm position, in January 2026 President Trump reduced the tariff on India to 18%, making it lower than those applied to Pakistan and China. Throughout these developments, Ambassador Kwatra played a significant role in maintaining engagement and restoring confidence in India–US relations. Ultimately, India and the United States came close to finalizing a comprehensive trade agreement.

== Personal life ==
He is married to Pooja Kwatra. The couple has two sons. Kwatra speaks French, Hindi and English.

== See also ==
- Indian Foreign Service
- Harsh Vardhan Shringla
- Taranjit Singh Sandhu
- Syed Akbaruddin

Diplomatic posts
| Preceded by Dr. Mohan Kumar | Ambassador of India to France; 2017–2020 | Succeeded by Jawed Ashraf |
| Preceded by Manjeev Singh Puri | Ambassador of India to Nepal; 2020–2022 | Succeeded by Naveen Srivastava |
| Preceded by Harsh Vardhan Shringla | Foreign Secretary of India; 2022-2024 | Succeeded by Vikram Misri |
| Preceded by Taranjit Singh Sandhu | Ambassador of India to the United States; 2024-Present | Incumbent |
