= A. Gitesh Sarma =

Indian diplomat

Anumula Gitesh Sarma

Secretary (West), Ministry of External Affairs, India
- In office November 2018 – April 2021
- Preceded by: Ruchi Ghanashyam

Personal details
- Born: March 25, 1961 (age 65)
- Spouse: Ratnamala Sarma
- Children: 1 daughter
- Education: M.A Hons (Political Science)
- Alma mater: Delhi University
- Occupation: Diplomat IFS
- Website: mea.gov.in

A. Gitesh Sarma or Anumula Gitesh Sarma (born in 1961) is an Indian diplomat. He has worked for the Indian Foreign Service since 1986. He completed his schooling from St. Xavier's School, Hazaribagh and received a BA and an MA (in political science) from Delhi University.

First he joined the India Audits & Accounts Department, Government of India in 1984 and subsequently the Indian Foreign Service in 1986.

He has worked in the Ministry of External Affairs as Under Secretary (Europe East) and Director (Central Asia ). He has also served as the Officer on Special Duty (IT Enabled Services) in the Information Technology Department of the state of Andhra Pradesh, Hyderabad, India and as Joint Secretary (External Relations) in the Department of Atomic Energy, Government of India.

His foreign assignments include Indian Missions in Moscow, Minsk, Odesa (Ukraine), Hong Kong, Islamabad and London.

Ambassador Sarma served as the Ambassador of India to Uzbekistan from 2011 to 2014 and the High Commissioner to Fiji from 2014 to 2015. He has also served as Joint Secretary and Additional Secretary prior to his appointment as Secretary (West) in the Ministry of External Affairs in November 2018.

He is married to Ratnamala Sarma and has a daughter.
