= Pradeep Kumar Rawat =

Indian diplomat

Pradeep Kumar Rawat IFS
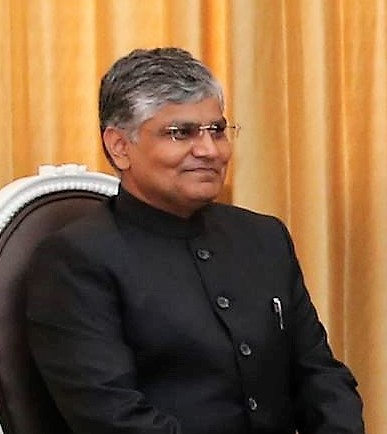

27th Ambassador of India to China
- In office 14 March 2022 – 31 March 2026
- Preceded by: Vikram Misri
- Succeeded by: Vikram Doraiswami

Ambassador of India to the Netherlands
- In office January 2021 – December 2021
- Preceded by: Venu Rajamony

Ambassador of India to Indonesia and Timor-Leste
- In office September 2017 – December 2020
- Succeeded by: Manoj Bharti

Director General of the India Taipei Association
- In office October 2009 – August 2013
- Preceded by: T.P. Seetharam
- Succeeded by: Manish Chauhan

Personal details
- Born: 1966 (age 59–60)

Pradeep Kumar Rawat (born 1966) is a retired Indian diplomat.

Rawat joined the Indian Foreign Service in 1990 and served in Hong Kong and Beijing between 1992 and 1997, then in Beijing again from 2003 to 2007. At the end of his tour in Beijing he was deputy chief of mission. He later served at the Indian mission in Mauritius.

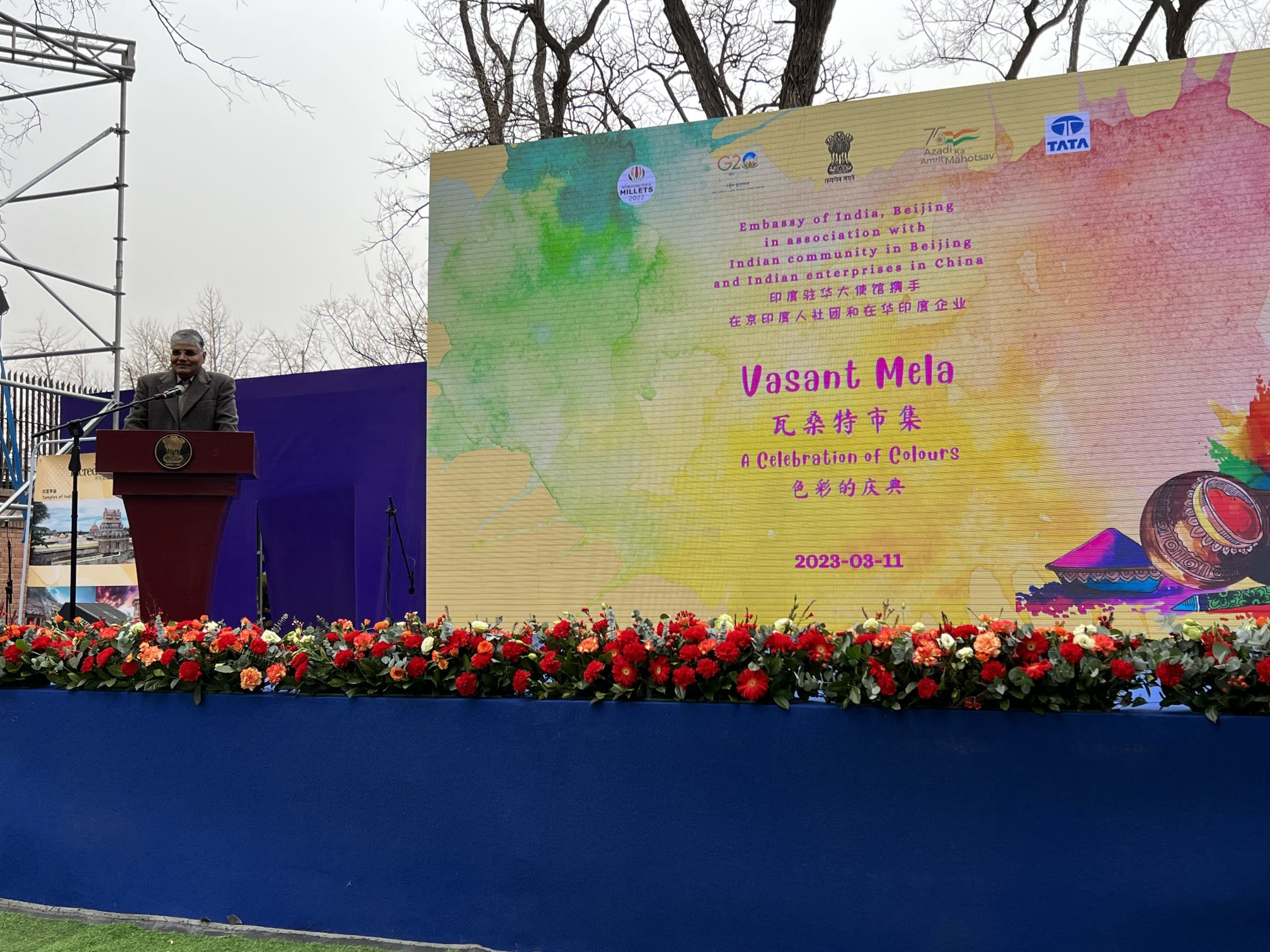
Rawat at the celebration of Vasant Mela at the Embassy of India, Beijing (2023)

In 2007 he became the head of the Ministry of External Affairs' East Asia division. From 2009 to 2013 he served as the director general of the India Taipei Association, India's diplomatic mission in Taiwan. From 2014 to 2017 he served as joint secretary for East Asia, and he was involved in negotiations about the 2017 Doklam standoff.

From September 2017 to December 2020, he was the ambassador of India to Indonesia and Timor-Leste. In 2021 he began serving as ambassador of India to the Netherlands. He also serves as Permanent Representative of India to the Organisation for the Prohibition of Chemical Weapons and handles India's relations with international bodies in The Hague such as the International Court of Justice.

In December 2021, it was announced that Rawat would become the ambassador of India to China, replacing Vikram Misri. His appointment was seen as a positive sign for China–India relations. On 14 March 2022, he arrived in China to take up the office and on 24 April 2023, he presented his credentials to President of China Xi Jinping.

== Personal life ==
Rawat is married and has two daughters. He speaks Mandarin Chinese fluently.
