= Gautam Mukhopadhaya =

Indian diplomat (born 1956)

His Excellency Gautam Mukhopadhaya, IFS (Retid.)

Ambassador of India to Myanmar
- In office 14 June 2013 – 31 May 2016
- Preceded by: V S Seshadri
- Succeeded by: Vikram Misri

Ambassador of India to Afghanistan
- In office March 2009 – December 2013
- Preceded by: Manpreet Vohra
- Succeeded by: Vinay Kumar

Indian Ambassador to Syria
- In office 2006–2008

Personal details
- Born: 25 May 1956 (age 70) India
- Education: (B.A.) St Stephen's College, Delhi; Delhi University (M.A.) Delhi School of Economics; Delhi University
- Profession: retired diplomat

Gautam Mukhopadhaya is a retired Indian diplomat of the Indian Foreign Service who has served as the Indian Ambassador to Syria, Afghanistan, and Myanmar. He has also worked in the United Nations Headquarters in New York as a Consultant on Social Development and has been a visiting scholar at the Carnegie Endowment for International Peace.

== Early life and education ==
He was born on 24 May 1956, and studied at the all-boys' boarding school, The Doon School in Dehradun. He completed his B.A. degree from St Stephen's College, Delhi and M.A. in sociology from Delhi School of Economics of Delhi University in India.

== Career ==
He joined the Foreign Service in 1980, and has served in various capacities in Indian Embassies in Mexico, France, Cuba, Afghanistan and Syria, the UN Mission in New York City, and the Ministry of External Affairs and Ministry of Defence, in India. He has also worked in the UN Headquarters in New York as a Consultant on Social Development. He re-opened the Indian Embassy in Kabul in November 2001 after the new regime took over in Afghanistan. His father, B.Mukhopadhaya, was a very famous doctor of his times in Bihar.

He has served in various capacities in the media and culture wings of the Ministry of External Affairs. He also coordinated the year-long ‘Festival of India’, the ‘l’annee de l’inde’ in France (1985–86). As India's representative to the Third Committee of the UN in New York (1996–1999), he dealt with issues relating to social development, human rights and advancement of women. He was also invited to join the UN Secretariat as a Consultant on social development for the preparatory process of the Copenhagen Social Summit plus Five UN General Assembly Special Session (2000) for which he wrote reports on the ‘Social impact of Globalization’. He also then spent 6 months (October 2009-March 2010) at the Carnegie Endowment for International Peace, Washington, as a visiting scholar.

Mr. Mukhopadhaya's career in the Indian Foreign Service has been notable for the range of his professional experience. These include media, culture, human rights, social development, defence and security, and conventional political and diplomatic assignments.
