= Manjeev Singh Puri =

Former Ambassador (born 1959)

His Excellency, IFS Manjeev Singh Puri
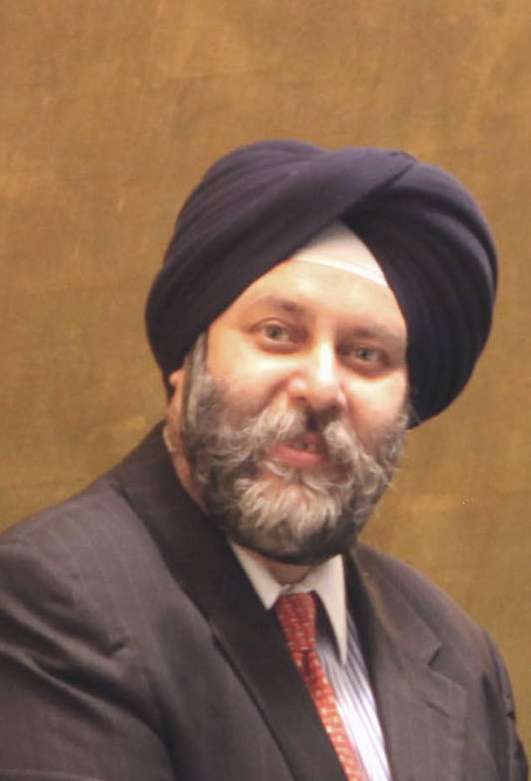

Indian Ambassador to Nepal
- In office March 2017 – January 2020
- Preceded by: Ranjit Rae
- Succeeded by: Vinay Mohan Kwatra

Ambassador of India to Belgium, Luxembourg and EU
- In office January 2014 – March 2017
- Preceded by: Dinkar Khullar
- Succeeded by: Gaitri Issar Kumar

Ambassador/Deputy Permanent Representative of India to the UN PMI
- In office March 2009 – December 2013

Personal details
- Born: 1959 (age 66–67) Punjab, India
- Spouse: Namrita
- Children: One daughter and one son
- Education: (B.A.) St Stephen's College, Delhi; Delhi University (M.B.A) Jamnalal Bajaj Institute of Management Studies; University of Mumbai
- Occupation: IFS
- Profession: Civil Servant
- Website: www.indianembassy.org

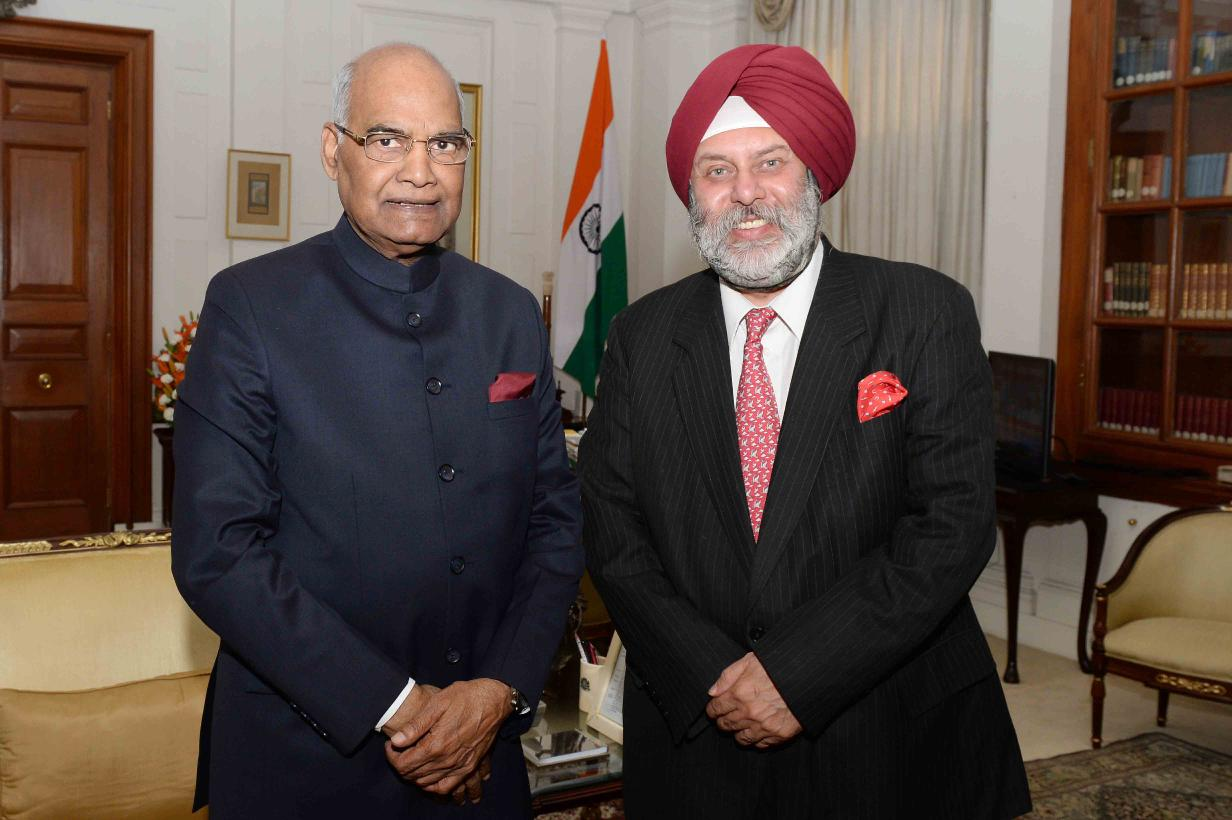
The Ambassador of India to Nepal, Shri Manjeev Singh Puri calling on the President of India, Shri Ram Nath Kovind, at Rastrapati Bhavan

Manjeev Singh Puri (Punjabi: ਮੰਜੀਵ ਸਿੰਘ ਪੁਰੀ) is a retired Indian diplomat of the Indian Foreign Service who has served as an Indian Ambassador to Nepal, Luxembourg, Belgium and European Union.

== Education ==
He has an MBA from Jamnalal Bajaj Institute of Management Studies of Mumbai University and got his B.A. (Honours) in Economics degree from St. Stephen's College, Delhi of Delhi University.

== Diplomatic career ==
Manjeev Singh Puri joined the Indian Foreign Service in the year 1982 and in the course of his diplomatic career spanning over 36 years, he has served in different capacity in Indian Missions abroad and in the India's Foreign Ministry including a number of multilateral organizations such as the United Nations, European Union etc.

In Delhi, he has served as Joint Secretary (UN- Economic & Social) and Deputy Chief of Protocol in the India's Foreign Ministry. Prior to becoming India's Ambassador to Nepal, he has served as Ambassador of India in Brussels from 2014-2017 and as Ambassador and Deputy Permanent Representative of India to the UN in New York from 2009 to 2013.

== Personal life ==
He serves on the advisory board of The Energy and Resources Institute. He is married to Ms. Namrita and has one daughter and one son.

== See also ==
- Harsh Vardhan Shringla
- Vijay Gokhale
- Navtej Sarna
- Taranjit Singh Sandhu
- Pankaj Saran
- Riva Ganguly Das
- S. Jaishankar
