= Gaitri Issar Kumar =

Indian diplomat and current High Commissioner of India to the United Kingdom

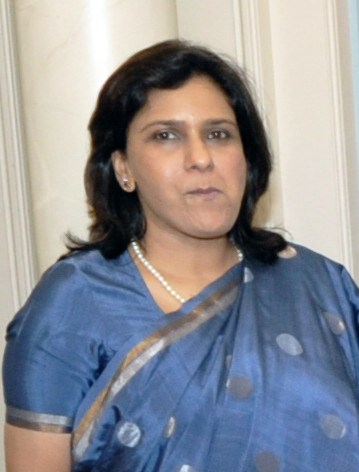

High Commissioner of India to the United Kingdom
- In office 23 June 2020 – 30 June 2022
- Preceded by: Ruchi Ghanashyam
- Succeeded by: Vikram Doraiswami

Ambassador of India to Belgium and the EU
- In office 17 April 2017 – June 2020
- Preceded by: Manjeev Singh Puri
- Succeeded by: Santosh Jha

Personal details
- Born: 20 June 1962 (age 64) Bangalore, Karnataka, India
- Occupation: Indian Foreign Service

Gaitri Issar Kumar (born 20 June 1962) is a retired Indian Foreign Service officer from the 1986 batch. Her last posting was as the High Commissioner of India to the United Kingdom. Prior to that, she served as Ambassador to Belgium, the European Union and Luxembourg. She also had stints as the Deputy Chief of Mission at the Indian Embassy in Paris, and Counselor in the Permanent Mission of India in Geneva as well as at the Ministry of External Affairs in Delhi.

== Early life and education ==
Kumar was born on 20 June 1962 in Bangalore to a Punjabi family. She completed her early education at Sophia High School and her graduation from Bangalore University where she studied history, economics and political science.

== Professional career ==
She joined the Indian Foreign Service as part of the 1986 batch of officers . After serving in several roles, including as the social secretary to the President of India in 2012, Kumar was appointed Ambassador to Belgium and the European Union on 14 June 2017. After the retirement of her predecessor Ruchi Ghanashyam, Kumar became the High Commissioner in London in June 2020. As High Commissioner, Kumar prioritized deepening Indo-UK ties and trade post-Brexit.
