= Ruchi Ghanashyam =

Indian diplomat (born 1960)

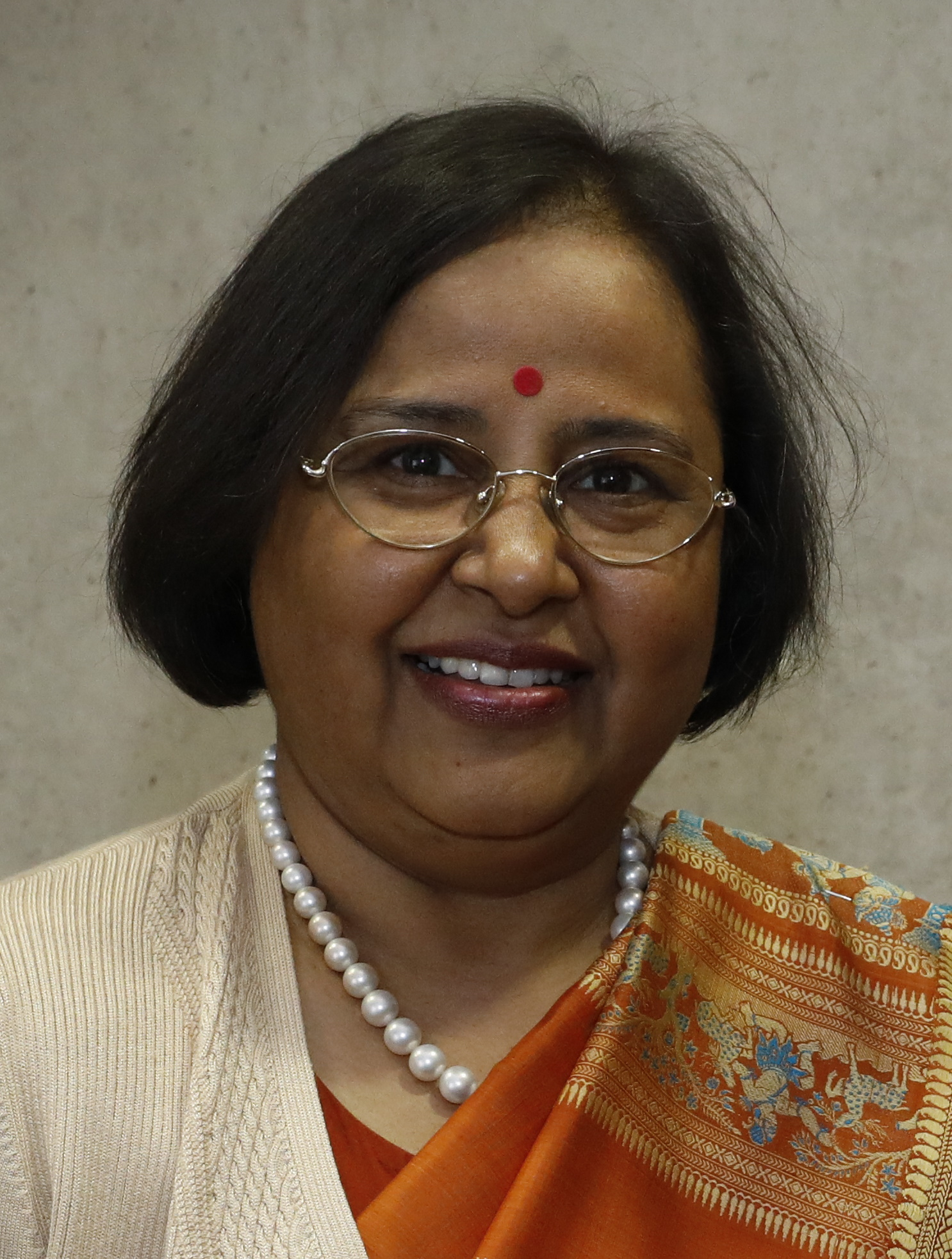

High Commissioner of India to the United Kingdom
- In office November 2018 – June 2020
- Preceded by: Yashvardhan Kumar Sinha
- Succeeded by: Gaitri Issar Kumar

Secretary (West), Ministry of External Affairs, India
- In office 17 April 2017 – November 2018
- Preceded by: Sujata Mehta
- Succeeded by: A. Gitesh Sarma

Indian High Commissioner to South Africa
- In office 28 October 2013 – 13 April 2017
- Preceded by: Virendra Gupta
- Succeeded by: Ruchira Kamboj

Indian High Commissioner to Ghana with concurrent accreditation to Burkina Faso, Togo and Sierra Leone
- In office 2008–2011
- Preceded by: Rajesh Nandan Prasad
- Succeeded by: Rajinder Bhagat

Minister, Permanent Mission of India to the United Nations, New York
- In office May 2004 – March 2008

Personal details
- Born: 4 April 1960 (age 66)
- Spouse: Ajjampur Rangaiah Ghanashyam
- Education: Bhopal University
- Occupation: Indian Foreign Service

Ruchi Ghanashyam (born 4 April 1960) is a retired Indian diplomat who belongs to the Indian Foreign Service.

== Personal life ==
Ruchi Ghanashyam holds a Master of Arts degree in psychology from Bhopal University. She is married to Ajjampur Rangaiah Ghanashyam, who also belonged to the Indian Foreign Service. They have two sons.

== Career ==
She joined the Indian Foreign Service in August 1982. She was the Third Secretary at the Indian Embassy in Damascus where she learnt Arabic. She has served in Indian missions in Brussels, Kathmandu, Damascus, Islamabad Pretoria and Accra. Ruchi has served at the Ministry of External Affairs in New Delhi as Director (Pakistan) from August 2000 to March 2004. Prior to this, she was the Counsellor (Political, Press & Information) at the Indian High Commission in Pakistan. As an Undersecretary at the Ministry of External Affairs in New Delhi, she handled the Audio-Visual Publicity for the Ministry.

Ghanashyam was the first Indian woman diplomat to be posted in Islamabad when the harassment of Indian diplomats was routine.

== See also ==
- A. Gitesh Sarma
- Vijay Gokhale
- Harsh V Shringla
- Taranjit Singh Sandhu
- Syed Akbaruddin
