= Venu Rajamony =

Indian diplomat

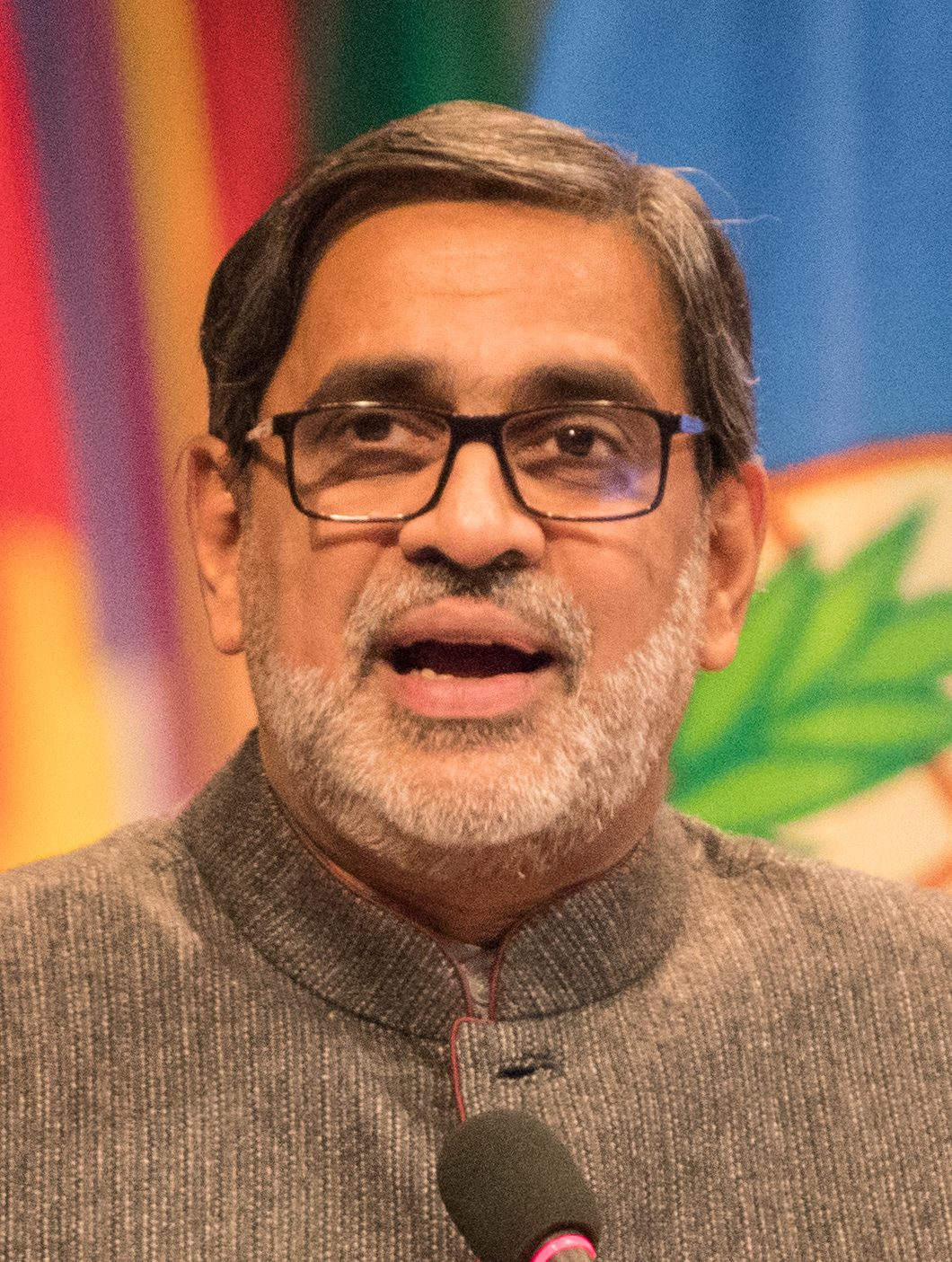

Officer on Special Duty (External Cooperation) to the State Government of Kerala
- In office 17 September 2021 – 16 September 2023

Ambassador of India to the Netherlands
- In office 8 May 2017 – 2020
- Preceded by: J.S. Mukul
- Succeeded by: Pradeep Kumar Rawat

Press Secretary, President of India
- In office 2012–2017
- President: Pranab Mukherjee

Consul General of India to Dubai
- In office 2007–2010
- Preceded by: Y.K. Sinha
- Succeeded by: Sanjay Verma

Personal details
- Born: 12 November 1960 (age 65)
- Education: Mahatma Gandhi University, Kerala; Jawaharlal Nehru University
- Occupation: Diplomat IFS
- Website: www.venurajamony.com

Venu Rajamony (born 12 November 1960) is an Indian diplomat and professor affiliated with the Indian Foreign Service. He serves as Chairman of the Future Kerala Mission and Principal Advisor at Jain University. He teaches Diplomatic Practice at the Jindal Global Law School of the O.P. Jindal Global University, Sonipat, Haryana. On September 17, 2021, he assumed the role of Officer on Special Duty for External Cooperation in the Government of Kerala, holding the rank of Chief Secretary with an office at Kerala House, New Delhi. He declined to continue his service with the State Government on completion of two years for reasons unknown. He held the position of Ambassador of India to the Netherlands from 2017 to 2020. He also served as the Permanent Representative of India to the Organization for the Prohibition of Chemical Weapons (OPCW) in The Hague, overseeing India’s relations with the International Court of Justice (ICJ) and the Permanent Court of Arbitration (PCA).

He was Press Secretary to the President of India during the tenure of President Pranab Mukherjee from 2012 to 2017.

== Early life and education ==
Venu Rajamony was born in Thiruvananthapuram, Kerala into a Tamil Brahmin family with a background in public life. His father K.S. Rajamony belongs to Mavelikara and was a senior advocate who practised law in Thiruvananthapuram and Kochi for over four decades. He was amongst the founders of the Kerala People's Arts Club and later served as a member of the Kerala Public Men’s Corruption Commission (subsequently the Kerala Lokayukta). His mother Seetha belongs to Thiruvanantapuram and was an active member of the Rotary and Inner wheel Club of the city. His paternal grandfather, S. Kulathu Iyer served for several years as Municipal Chairman of Mavelikara and was state President of the Kerala Brahmana Sabha. His maternal grandfather, S. Nilakanta Iyer was a leading lawyer of Thiruvanantapuram and a legislator in the assembly of the Travancore Kochi state.

He subsequently pursued a pre-degree course at Maharajas College, Ernakulam (1976–1978) and graduated from there in 1981 with a BA in Politics. He was elected as Chairman of the Maharaja's College Students' Union during 1980–81 under the panel of Kerala Students Union.

Moving to New Delhi to pursue a Master's degree in International Studies from Jawaharlal Nehru University (JNU), he served as Vice President of the Students' Union there during 1981 and 1982. Later, he earned an LLB degree from Ernakulam Law College, Mahatma Gandhi University (1983–1986).

Fluent in the Chinese language, Rajamony is also proficient in Malayalam, Tamil, Hindi, and French. Rajamony also holds a Certificate in Chinese Language from the University of Hong Kong.

He is married to Saroj Thapa, an education professional, and they have two children, Vasanth and Karthik.

== Early career ==
He began his career as a journalist with the Indian Express, Kochi, in 1983. He cleared the Indian Foreign Service exam in 1986 at University College, Thiruvananthapuram.

== Dipomatic career ==
While serving as Consul General of India in Dubai from 2007 to 2010, Rajamony initiated several measures for the welfare of the two million-strong Indian community there and to enhance trade and investment between the UAE and India.

During his tenure in the Netherlands, Rajamony represented India before the ICJ in The Hague in the case of "Advisory Opinion concerning the Legal Consequences of the Separation of the Chagos Archipelago from Mauritius." He was part of the Indian delegation before the ICJ in the Jadhav case (India Vs. Pakistan) and served as Co-Agent of India in the Enrica Lexie incident case (Italy Vs. India) before the PCA. Additionally, he led the Indian delegation to various sessions of the Conference of States Parties and Executive Council of the OPCW.

== Post-diplomatic career ==
In September 2021, Rajamony was appointed Officer on Special Duty (OSD) for External Cooperation in the Government of Kerala, with the rank of Chief Secretary. In this role, he coordinated with the Ministry of External Affairs, foreign missions in India, and Indian diplomatic missions abroad, particularly on issues concerning the Kerala diaspora. His responsibilities included exploring opportunities for external cooperation in areas such as trade, investment, education, skill development, and culture, and assisting the state government in its interactions with foreign officials and visiting business delegations. He resigned from the position in September 2023 following differences with the state government.

He is a Professor of Diplomatic Practice at Jindal Global Law School, O.P. Jindal Global University, Sonipat, Haryana.

In addition to his role at Jindal Global Law School, in December 2024, Rajamony was appointed K.P.S. Menon Chair Professor for Diplomatic Studies at the School of International Relations and Politics, Mahatma Gandhi University, Kottayam.

In April 2025, Rajamony was appointed Chairman of the Future Kerala Mission, an initiative launched by Kochi Jain University aimed at promoting industry-linked education, entrepreneurship, employment generation, and socially responsible development in Kerala. He also serves as Principal Advisor to the university.

He is also the President of the Maharaja’s College Old Students Association.

== Literary career ==
- India-China-US Triangle: A Soft Balance of Power in the Making, monograph published during his fellowship at the Centre for Strategic and International Studies (CSIS) in Washington, DC, from 2001 to 2002
- India and the UAE: In Celebration of a Legendary Friendship, Lustre Publications, 2008, ISBN 978-1860632808
- India and The Netherlands – Past, Present and Future, Bombay Ink, 2019, ISBN 978-9090321011
- What We Can Learn From The Dutch – Rebuilding Kerala Post 2018 Floods, DC Books, 2019, ISBN 978-9352825929
- Select Paintings of Rashtrapati Bhavan (Portfolio), Lalit Kala Akademi, 2016, ISBN 978-8187507659
- Company Paintings in Rashtrapati Bhavan (Portfolio), Lalit Kala Akademi, 2016, ISBN 978-8187507642
- Paintings in the Ashoka Hall of Rashtrapati Bhavan (Portfolio), Lalit Kala Akademi, 2016, ISBN 978-8187507635
