= Vikram Misri =

Foreign Secretary of India (born 1964)

Vikram Misri IFS
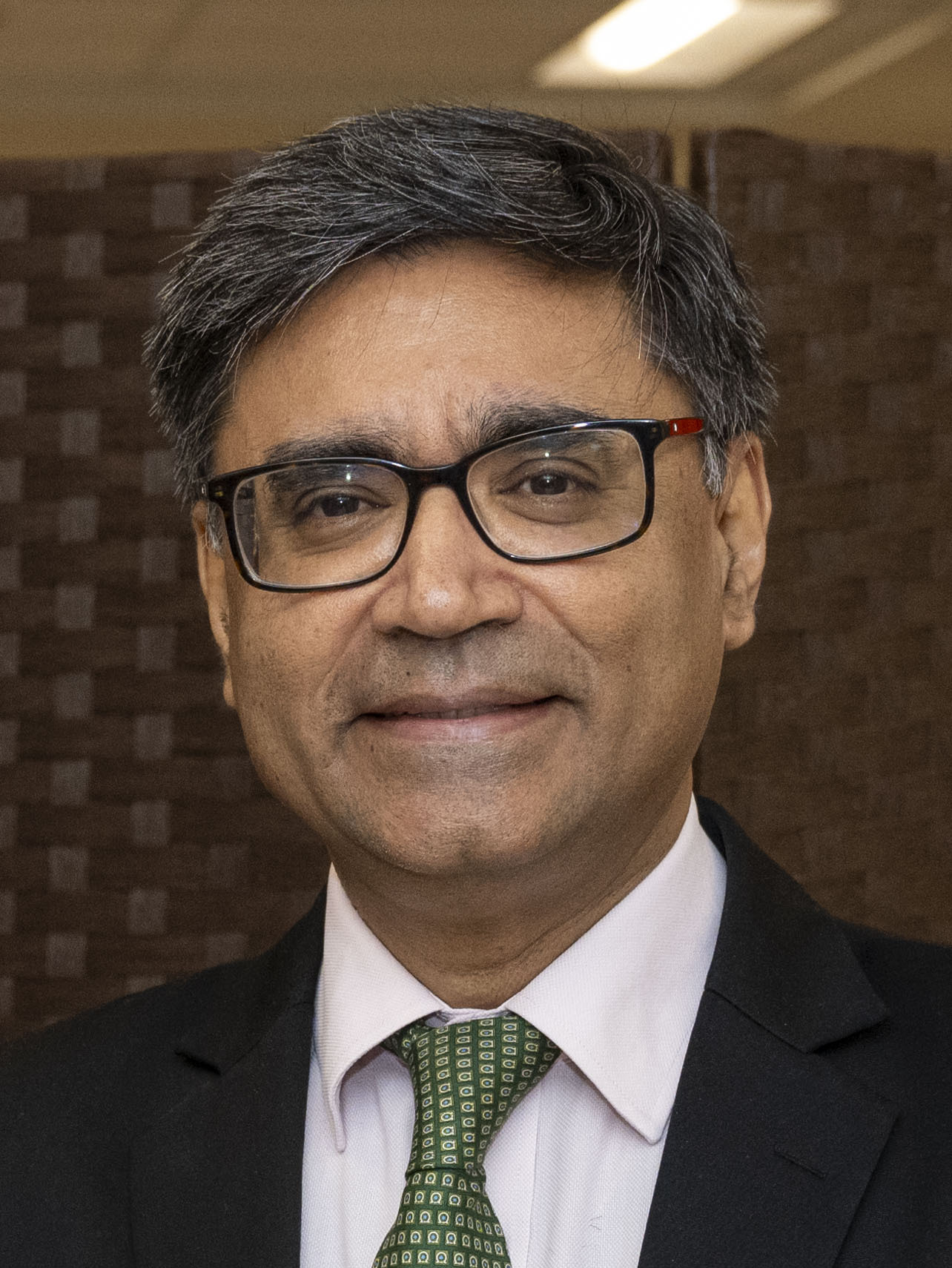
- Misri in 2024

35th Foreign Secretary of India
- Incumbent
- Assumed office 15 July 2024
- President: Droupadi Murmu
- Prime Minister: Narendra Modi
- Minister: S. Jaishankar
- Preceded by: Vinay Mohan Kwatra

Deputy National Security Advisor of India
- In office 1 January 2022 – 14 July 2024
- President: Ram Nath Kovind; Droupadi Murmu
- Prime Minister: Narendra Modi
- Preceded by: Pankaj Saran
- Succeeded by: Pavan Kapoor

26th Ambassador of India to China
- In office 8 January 2019 – 11 December 2021
- President: Ram Nath Kovind
- Prime Minister: Narendra Modi
- Preceded by: Gautam Bambawale
- Succeeded by: Pradeep Kumar Rawat

Ambassador of India to Myanmar
- In office 2016 – 2018
- President: Pranab Mukherjee; Ram Nath Kovind
- Prime Minister: Narendra Modi
- Preceded by: Gautam Mukhopadhaya
- Succeeded by: Saurabh Kumar

Ambassador of India to Spain
- In office 2014 – 2016
- President: Pranab Mukherjee
- Prime Minister: Narendra Modi
- Preceded by: Sunil Lal
- Succeeded by: Venkatachalam Mahalingam

Personal details
- Born: 7 November 1964 (age 61) Srinagar, Jammu and Kashmir, India
- Spouse: Dolly Misri
- Children: 2
- Education: Delhi University (B.A.); Hindu College; XLRI Jamshedpur (MBA)
- Occupation: Indian Foreign Service
- Profession: Diplomat
- Rank: Secretary

Vikram Misri (born 7 November 1964) is an Indian diplomat of the Indian Foreign Service, currently serving as the 35th Foreign Secretary of India since July 2024. Previously, he served as the Deputy National Security Advisor of India from January 2022 until July 2024, and as the ambassador of India to China from January 2019 to December 2021.

Previously, he has served as the private secretary to three Prime Ministers: Inder Kumar Gujral, Manmohan Singh and Narendra Modi, and also as the Indian ambassador to Spain and Myanmar.

== Early life and education ==
Misri was born in Srinagar, Jammu and Kashmir in a Kashmiri Pandit family.

Misri attended Burn Hall School and DAV School in Srinagar. He then studied at Carmel Convent School in Udhampur and at Scindia School in Gwalior. Later, he completed his undergraduate degree in history from the Hindu College, Delhi. He also completed an MBA degree at the XLRI – Xavier School of Management, Jamshedpur.

== Career ==
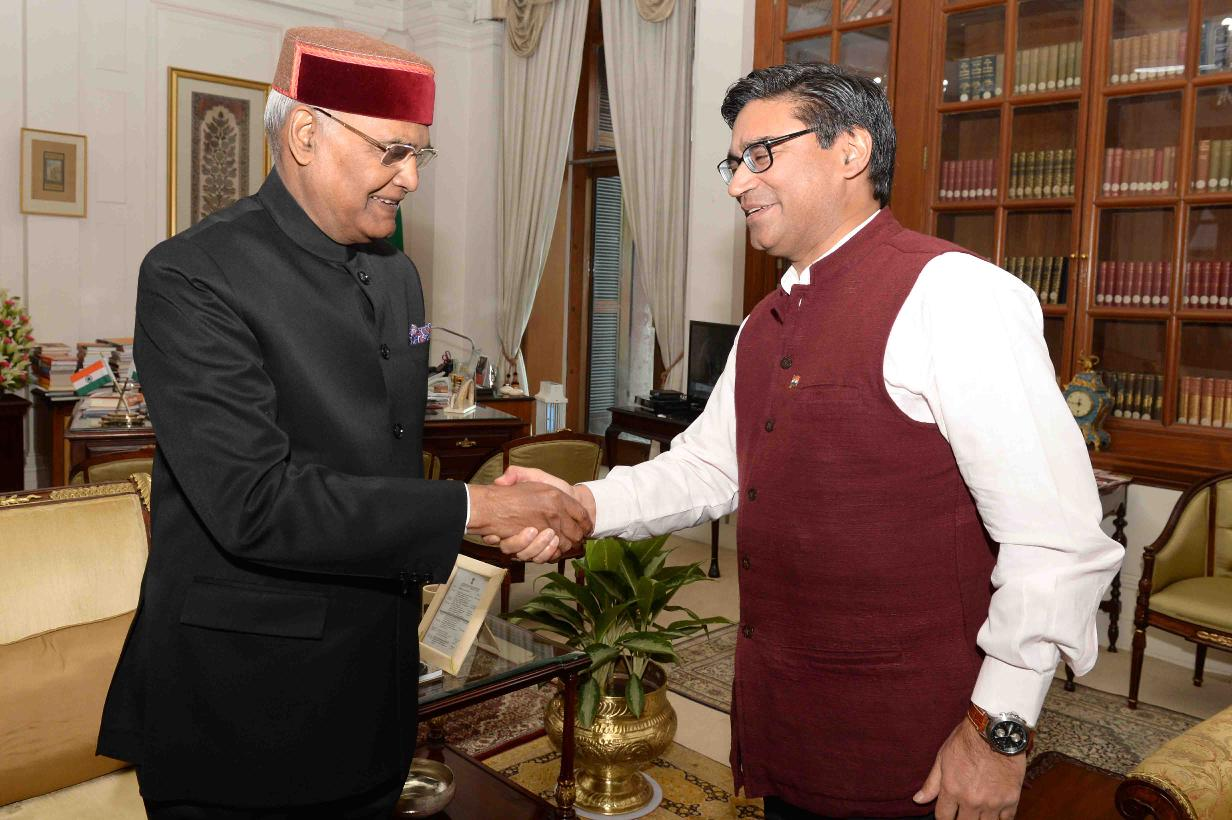
Vikram Misri calling on the President of India, Ram Nath Kovind, at Rashtrapati Bhavan on 15 January 2018

After completing his education, Misri worked for three years in advertising. He did stints with Lintas India in Mumbai and Contract Advertising in Delhi, and advertising film making.

He joined the Indian Foreign Service in 1989. From January 1991 to September 1993, he was posted in Brussels as Third Secretary and Second Secretary; from September 1993 to October 1996 in Tunis as Second Secretary and First Secretary.

After returning to New Delhi, he served as an Under Secretary and Private Secretary in the Office of the External Affairs Minister of India Inder Kumar Gujral since November 1996 to April 1997 and then during his Prime Ministership during April 1997 to March 1998. From April 1998 to August 2000, he served as the Deputy Secretary for the Pakistan Desk in the MEA.

From August 2000 to September 2003, he served in Islamabad as First Secretary, then Counsellor, and also as Chargé d'affaires; from September 2003 to October 2006 in Washington D.C. as Political Counsellor in the Embassy of India, Washington, D.C..

From November 2006 to September 2008, he served as Director of the Office of the External Affairs Minister Pranab Mukherjee.

From September 2008 to September 2011, he served as Deputy High Commissioner of India in Sri Lanka. From September 2011 to February 2012, he was Consul General of India in Munich.

From March 2012 to October 2012, he served as the Joint Secretary in the Prime Minister’s Office, New Delhi and was appointed as the private secretary to Prime Minister Manmohan Singh. He continued to serve in that capacity when Singh was succeeded by Narendra Modi.

=== Ambassador of India to Spain and Myanmar ===
He was appointed Ambassador of India to Spain in 2014 and Ambassador of India to Myanmar in 2016.

=== Ambassador of India to China ===
In 2019, he was appointed the ambassador to China. He was the ambassador during the 2020–2021 China–India skirmishes and held a series of meetings with senior Chinese officials, including Liu Jianchao to discuss the tensions.

=== Deputy National Security Advisor ===
He was appointed as the Deputy National Security Advisor of India (Dy. NSA) from 1 January 2022 in the National Security Council Secretariat.

=== Foreign Secretary ===
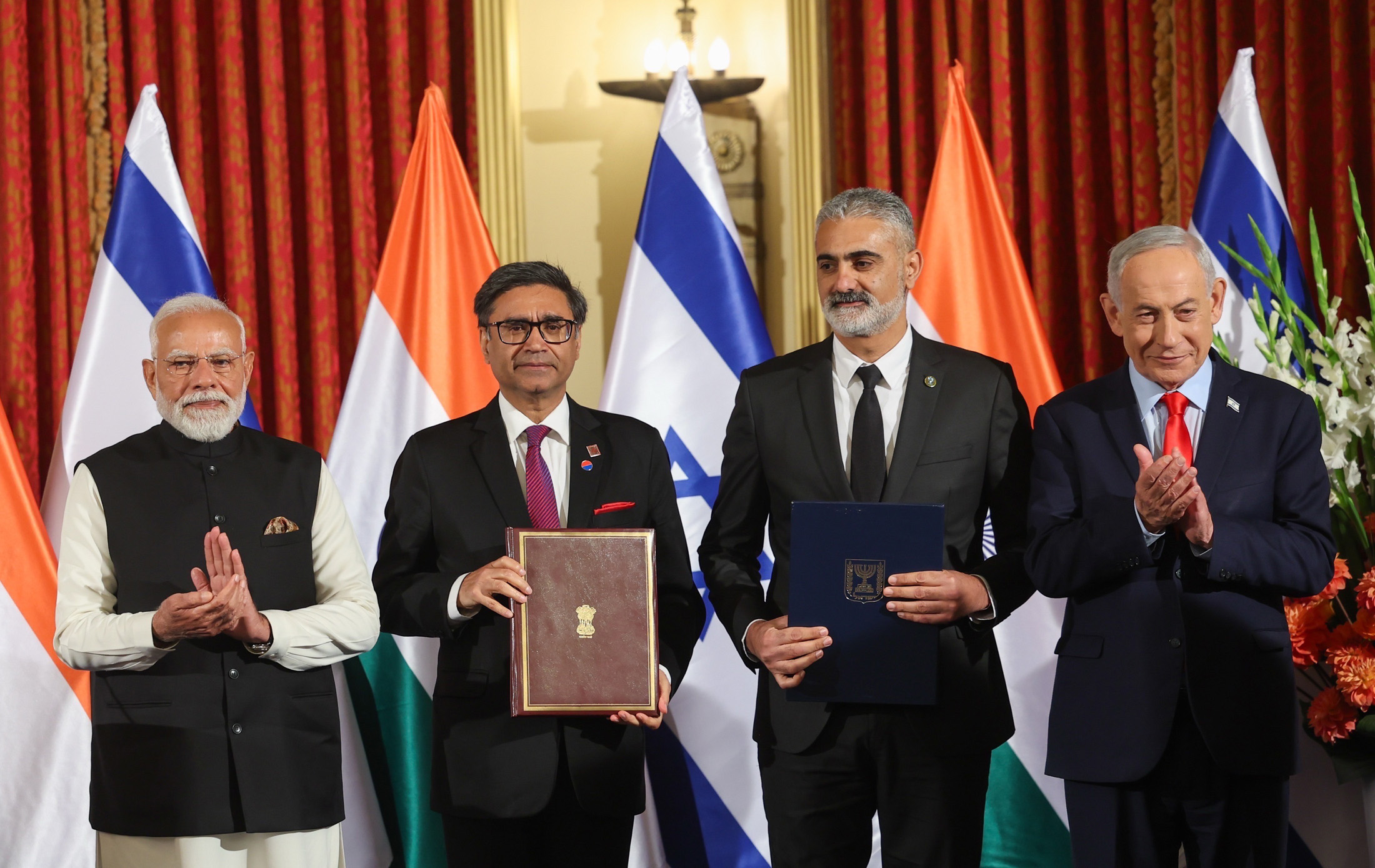
Foreign Secretary Vikram Misri with PM Modi and PM Netanyahu in Israel, February 26, 2026

On 28 June 2024, it was announced that Mr. Misri would succeed Vinay Mohan Kwatra to assume the post of Foreign Secretary of India. On 15 July 2024, he became the 35th Foreign Secretary of India.

== Personal life ==
Misri is married to Dolly and has two children. He is fluent in English, Hindi, and Kashmiri and has a working knowledge of French. He is a fellow of ASPEN Institute USA's India leadership initiative, now known as the Kamalnayan Bajaj Fellowship.

Diplomatic posts
Preceded by Gautam Bambawale	Ambassador of India to China; 2019 - 2021	Succeeded by Pradeep Kumar Rawat
Preceded by Vinay Mohan Kwatra	Foreign Secretary; 2024 - Present	Incumbent
