= Sujata Mehta (diplomat) =

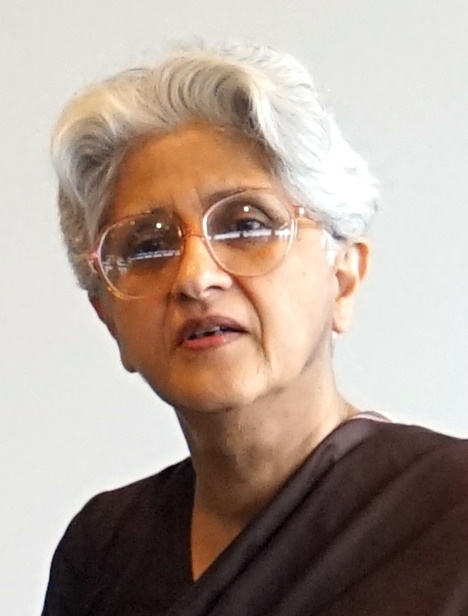

Member, Union Public Service Commission
- In office 21 February 2017 – 30 March 2023

Secretary (West), Ministry of External Affairs
- In office 11 January 2016 – 21 February 2017
- Preceded by: Navtej Sarna
- Succeeded by: Ruchi Ghanashyam

Indian Ambassador to Spain
- In office November 2007 – August 2011
- Preceded by: Suryakanthi Tripathi
- Succeeded by: Sunil Kumar Lal

Personal details
- Born: 30 March 1957 (age 68) New Delhi
- Occupation: Diplomat

Sujata Mehta is a former Indian Foreign Service officer and former member of the Union Public Service Commission.

== Personal life ==
Sujata Singh was born on 30 March 1957. She holds a Master of Philosophy in Political Science and joined the Indian Foreign Service in 1980.

== Career ==
An Indian Foreign Service officer of the 1980 cadre, Mehta served as the Third Secretary at the Embassy of India in Moscow from August 1982 to February 1984. She has also served at Indian missions in Dhaka, India's permanent mission at the United Nations and as the Indian Ambassador to Spain. She was also deputed at the United Nations. Sujata Mehta served as Ambassador and Permanent Representative of India to the United Nations Conference on Disarmament, Geneva. She also served in various capacities at the Ministry of External Affairs and the Prime Minister's Office.

Sujata Mehta was appointed as a member of the Union Public Service Commission about a month prior to her superannuation. She left the Indian Foreign Service and was sworn in on 21 February 2017 and served their till 30 March 2023.
