= Rakesh Sood =

Indian diplomat, columnist and writer (born 1953)

- Born: 5 February 1953 (age 73)
- Occupations: Civil Servant (IFS); Distinguished Fellow at the Observer Research Foundation
- Known for: Former Indian Ambassador to Afghanistan and Nepal

Rakesh Sood (born 5 February 1953) is a former Indian diplomat of the Indian Foreign Service cadre, columnist, and writer. He was appointed as Prime Minister Manmohan Singh's special envoy for disarmament and non-proliferation in September, 2013. He did his secondary schooling at Ramjas Higher Secondary School -5, New Delhi. He studied physics at St. Stephen's College, Delhi and went on to join the Indian Foreign Service in July 1976.

He has served as India's Ambassador to Afghanistan and Nepal, Ambassador and Permanent Representative to the Conference on Disarmament in Geneva. He has also served as Deputy Chief of Mission in the Embassy of India in Washington DC.

Among his other assignments abroad, Ambassador Sood has been First Secretary and Counsellor in India's High Commission in Islamabad and First Secretary in the Permanent Mission of India to the United Nations Offices in Geneva, apart from serving in India's diplomatic missions in Brussels and Dakar. Rakesh also served as Indian Ambassador to France with concurrent accreditation to Monaco.

At the Ministry of External Affairs, Mr. Sood was Joint Secretary heading the Disarmament and International Security Affairs Division.
