= Dalip Mehta =

Indian diplomat

Dalip Mehta is a retired Indian diplomat. He was India's Ambassador to Bhutan and the Central Asian Republics of Uzbekistan, Tajikistan and Turkmenistan. He was also the Secretary of Ministry of Foreign Affairs, Government of India and Dean of Foreign Service Institute, India from 1998 till 2002. Dalip Mehta is a Trustee of Foundation for Universal Responsibility of His Holiness the Dalai Lama and a Director of the India-Bhutan Foundation.

== Education ==
Mehta went to The Doon School for his primary education and then to University of Cambridge.
