= Yashvardhan Kumar Sinha =

Indian diplomat

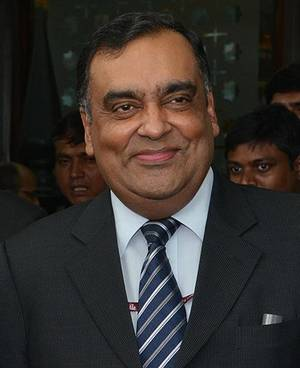

Chief Information Commissioner of India
- In office 7 November 2020 – 3 October 2023
- Preceded by: Bimal Julka
- Succeeded by: Heeralal Samariya

High Commissioner of India to the United Kingdom
- In office 7 December 2016 – October 2018
- Preceded by: Navtej Sarna
- Succeeded by: Ruchi Ghanashyam

High Commissioner of India to Sri Lanka
- In office June 2013 – December 2016
- Preceded by: Ashok Kantha
- Succeeded by: Taranjit Singh Sandhu

Indian Ambassador to Venezuela
- In office January 2007 – August 2009

Consul General of India, Dubai
- In office August 2003 – December 2006

Personal details
- Born: 4 October 1958 (age 67)
- Spouse: Girija Sinha
- Children: 2 sons
- Education: St. Michael's High School, Patna; St. Stephen's College, Delhi & University of Delhi
- Occupation: Diplomat IFS

Yashvardhan Kumar Sinha (born 4 October 1958) is a retired Indian diplomat who belongs to the Indian Foreign Service. He is the former High Commissioner of India to the United Kingdom. He was sworn in as Central Information Commissioner on 1 January 2019. He was elevated to the post of Chief Information Commissioner on 7 November 2020 and served till 3 October 2023.

== Personal life ==
Yashvardhan Kumar Sinha hails from Bihar. Born in a Kayastha family of Patna, he was schooled at Chesham and at the St. Michael's High School, Patna. He holds a B.A. (Honours) degree in History from St. Stephen's College, Delhi and a Master of Arts degree in History from the University of Delhi. He also has an advanced diploma in Arabic from the American University in Cairo. He is married to Girija Sinha and they have two sons. He is the son of Lieutenant General Srinivas Kumar Sinha, PVSM, who was former Vice Chief of the Army Staff of the Indian Army, former Governor of Jammu and Kashmir and Assam, and former Ambassador of India to Nepal.

== Career ==
Sinha is an Indian Foreign Service officer of the 1981 batch. After retiring from foreign service, he was first appointed as Central Information Commissioner on 1 January 2019 and was subsequently sworn in as the Chief Information Commissioner of India on 7 November 2020 and served the office till 3 October 2023.

== Awards ==
Sinha is a recipient of the Distinguished Xaverian Award conferred by the St. Xavier's High School Patna Alumni Association in 2018. He was also awarded the Bharat Nirman Award in February 2020 by Bharat Nirman, an NGO. He was conferred the HRPC Dr Bhim Rao Ambedkar International Human Rights Award in December 2025.
