= List of ambassadors of India to China =

Ambassador of India to China

- Flag of India

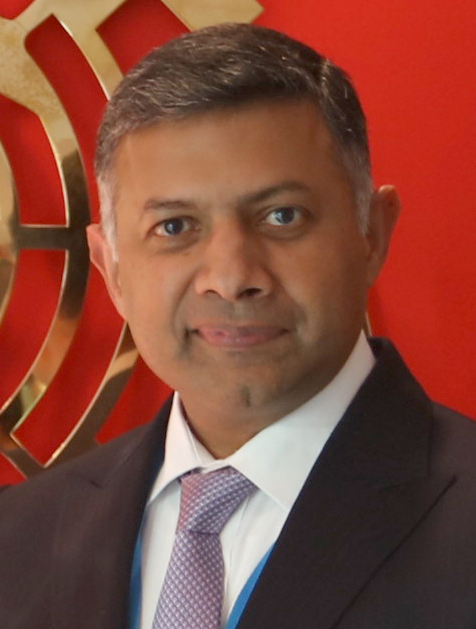
- Incumbent; Vikram Doraiswami since 2026
- Seat: Beijing, China
- Inaugural holder: K. M. Panikkar
- Formation: 1950

The ambassador of India to China is the chief diplomatic representative of the Republic of India to the People's Republic of China.

== Ambassadors ==
People's Republic of China (1950–present)
Name	Photo	Title	Date from	Date until
K. M. Panikkar		Ambassador	20 May 1950	12 September 1952
N. Raghavan		Ambassador	13 September 1952	5 November 1955
Ratan Kumar Nehru		Ambassador	6 November 1955	27 July 1958
G. Parthasarathi		Ambassador	27 July 1958	19 July 1961
P. K. Banerjee		Chargés d'affaires en pied	20 July 1961	1 April 1964
R. D. Sathe		Chargés d'affaires en pied	30 May 1966	3 February 1969
Brajesh Mishra		Chargés d'affaires en pied	19 April 1969	11 August 1973
L. L. Mehrotra		Chargés d'affaires en pied	12 August 1973	19 June 1976
K. R. Narayanan		Ambassador	7 July 1976	11 November 1978
R. D. Sathe		Ambassador	12 December 1978	15 November 1979
Katyayani Shankar Bajpai		Ambassador	13 July 1980	6 July 1982
A. P. Venkateswaran		Ambassador	27 September 1982	January 1985
K. P. S. Menon Jr.		Ambassador	26 March 1985	12 February 1987
C. V. Ranganathan		Ambassador	28 May 1987	31 May 1991
Salman Haidar		Ambassador	22 August 1991	27 November 1992
Chandrashekhar Dasgupta		Ambassador	8 January 1993	10 June 1996
Vijay K. Nambiar		Ambassador	9 September 1996	28 June 2000
Shivshankar Menon		Ambassador	3 August 2000	7 July 2003
Nalin Surie		Ambassador	23 August 2003	19 October 2006
Nirupama Rao		Ambassador	27 October 2006	15 July 2009
Subrahmanyam Jaishankar		Ambassador	12 August 2009	14 December 2013
Ashok Kantha		Ambassador	6 January 2014	20 January 2016
Vijay Gokhale		Ambassador	20 January 2016	21 October 2017
Gautam Bambawale		Ambassador	19 November 2017	30 November 2018
Vikram Misri		Ambassador	8 January 2019	27 December 2021
Acquino Vimal		Chargés d'affaires en pied	28 December 2021	13 March 2024
Pradeep Kumar Rawat		Ambassador	14 March 2022	18 March 2026
Vikram Doraiswami		Ambassador	19 March 2026	Incumbent

== See also ==
- Embassy of India, Beijing
