= Sushma Swaraj Institute of Foreign Service =

Government institute for civil servants in India

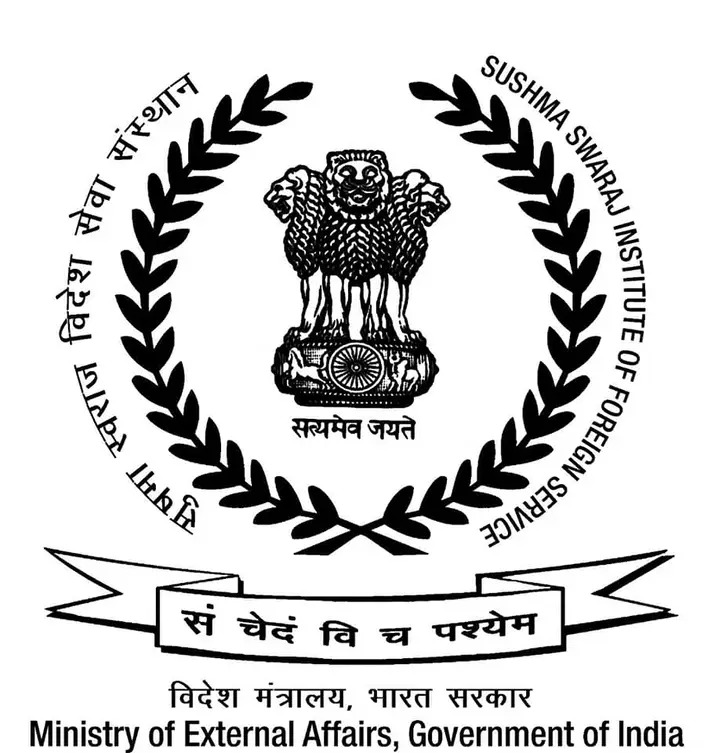
- Seal of SSIFS
- Other name: SSIFS
- Former name: Foreign Service Institute(FSI)
- Type: Civil Service training institute
- Established: 1986 (40 years ago)
- Parent institution: Ministry of External Affairs
- Affiliations: Government of India
- Budget: ₹25.30 crore (US$2.6 million) (2025–26)
- Dean: Raj Kumar Srivastava, IFS
- Location: New Delhi, NCR, Delhi, 110067, India
- Campus: 6 acres (2.4 ha); Metropolis
- Colours
- Website: ssifs.mea.gov.in

The Sushma Swaraj Institute of Foreign Service (SSIFS) is a civil service training institute in New Delhi, where Indian Foreign Service officers are trained. The institute functions under the Ministry of External Affairs, Government of India.

== About ==
The institute is headed by the Dean of the Foreign Service Institute, who is an officer of the Indian Foreign Service of the rank of Secretary or Joint Secretary to the Government of India. Other officers deputed to the institute are - two Joint Secretaries, a Deputy Secretary and an Under Secretary; but this composition may change from time to time. The institute, within its premises, also has a hostel and a few flats for the Officer Trainees of the Indian Foreign Service and other officials on deputation to the institute respectively.

"The Sushma Swaraj Institute of Foreign Service" was established by the Government of India in 1986 primarily to cater to the professional training needs of the trainees of the Indian Foreign Service and use to run from two rooms in Akbar Bhawan. The training programme of the Indian diplomats goes on for about a year, during which they are taught various aspects of India's foreign policy, international relations, Indian history and culture, Indian and the world economic scenario, communication and interpersonal skills, and the like, before they take up posting within the Ministry of External Affairs and sent abroad later.

The SSIFS's activities were later diversified to include courses of interest to all levels of officers of the Indian Ministry of External Affairs and also to other officers of the civil services of India. The institute also conducts courses for Diplomats of other countries. This course is known as Professional Course For Foreign Diplomats (PCFD). The SSIFS moved to its new building in 2007 in the old JNU campus on Baba Ganganath Marg in New Delhi, near Munirka, between JNU & IIT Delhi.

The institute was renamed as Sushma Swaraj Institute of Foreign Service on 14 February 2020 in honour of former Minister of External Affairs of India Sushma Swaraj on her 68th birth anniversary.

== Facilities ==
The Institution Block functions as the main training center and includes administrative offices, lecture halls, two conference halls (the second inaugurated in 2018), a computer lab, a library, and an auditorium. Most training activities are held in the conference halls. The auditorium, with a seating capacity of about 180, hosts major official and cultural events. The library contains approximately 15,000 books, and the computer lab has 30 computer terminals.

The residential complex consists of five blocks. One block houses the Dean, while Block B includes two residences for Joint Secretaries. Block C has eight flats for other SSIFS officers. Block D contains 30 family accommodation flats for IFS Officer Trainees, and Block E has 11 flats for SSIFS staff and essential services. The hostel accommodates 40 IFS Officer Trainees and includes five guest rooms. The campus also provides a health club and sports facilities such as a swimming pool, two tennis courts, and two badminton courts.

== Deans of the Foreign Service Institute ==
The following people have served as Dean of the Institute:

Name	From	To
A. N. D. Haksar	1988	1990
Kiran Doshi	1991	1992
S. M. S. Chadha	1992	1995
Lalit Mansingh	1995	1996
Dilip Lahiri	January 1997	November 1997
M. Venkataraman	November 1997	November 1998
Bhaskar Mitra (Acting)	November 1998	December 1998
Dalip Mehta	December 1998	June 2002
Santosh Kumar	August 2002	October 2004
Atish Sinha	December 2004	November 2006
Surendra Kumar	December 2006	February 2008
Ajay Choudhry	March 2008	March 2013
Ms. Nengcha Lhouvum Mukhopadhyay	April 2013	December 2015
Amarendra Khatua	January 2016	September 2016
J. S. Mukul	September 2017	September 2021
Arun Kumar Chatterjee (additional charge)	September 2021	2023
Gaddam Dharmendra	2023	July 2024
Sanjiv Ranjan	July 2024	September 2024
Raj Kumar Srivastava	September 2024	Incumbent

== See also ==
- Indian Foreign Service
- Indian Council of World Affairs
