= Indian Foreign Service =

Diplomatic service

- Service overview
- Motto: Vasudhaiva Kutumbakam "The World is One Family"
- Abbreviation: IFS
- Date of establishment: 9 October 1946; 80 years ago
- Headquarters: South Block, New Delhi
- Country: India
- Staff college: Sushma Swaraj Institute of Foreign Service, New Delhi
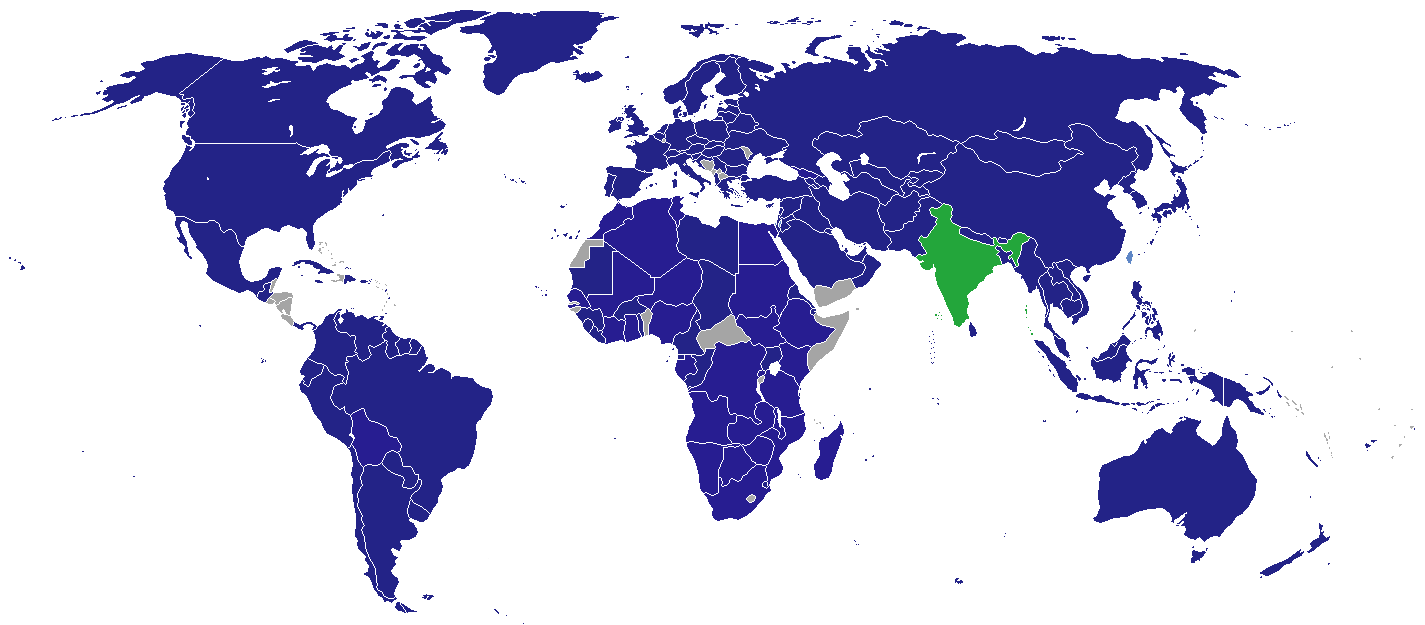
- Field of operation: Diplomatic missions of India
- Cadre controlling authority: Ministry of External Affairs
- Minister responsible: S. Jaishankar, Minister of External Affairs
- Legal personality: Governmental: Civil service
- Preceding service: Indian Civil Service
- Cadre strength: 3,556 members (2025) (Group A - 1177; Group B - 2379)

Service Chief
- Foreign Secretary: Vikram Misri, IFS

The Indian Foreign Service (IFS) is a diplomatic service and a central civil service of the Government of the Republic of India under the Ministry of External Affairs. The Foreign Secretary is the head of the service. Vikram Misri is the 35th and the current Foreign Secretary.

The service, consisting of civil servants is entrusted with handling the foreign relations of India and providing consular services, and to mark India's presence in international organizations. It is the body of career diplomats serving in more than 160 Indian diplomatic missions and international organizations around the world. In addition, they serve at the President's Secretariat, the Prime Minister's Office and at the headquarters of MEA in New Delhi. They also head Regional Passport Offices throughout the country and hold positions in several ministries on deputation.

Indian Foreign Service officers have been 8 times Presidents of the UN Security Council (Note: B. N. Rau (June 1950 and March 1951), G. Parthasarathy (September 1967), Samar Sen (December 1972), Rikhi Jaipal (October 1977), Natarajan Krishnan (February 1985), Chinmaya R. Gharekhan (October 1991 and December 1992), Hardeep Singh Puri (August 2011 and November 2012), T. S. Tirumurti (August 2021), Ruchira Kamboj (December 2022).), several Under-Secretary-General of the United Nations (Note: Chinmaya Gharekhan (UN USG, 1993), Atul Khare (UN USG)), 3 National Security Advisors (Note: Brajesh Mishra, Jyotindra Nath Dixit and Shivshankar Menon), and have been elected to offices of President, Vice President, Governors of States, Speaker of Lok Sabha, and Cabinet ministers.

== History ==
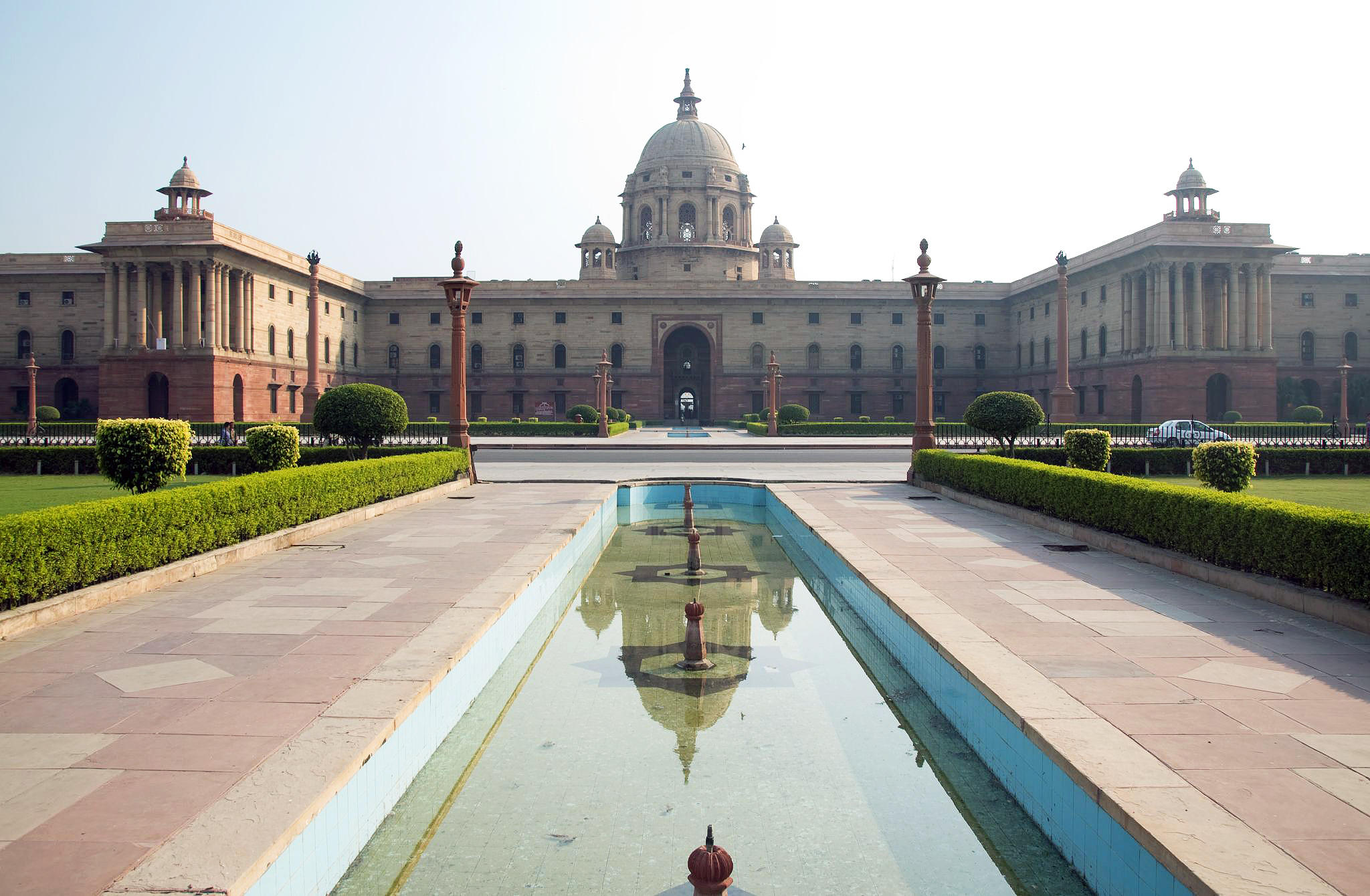
South Block The HQ of Ministry of External Affairs, Prime Minister's Office and Defence Ministry in New Delhi

On 13 September 1783, the board of directors of the East India Company passed a resolution at Fort William, Calcutta (now Kolkata), to create a department, which could help "relieve the pressure" on the Warren Hastings administration in conducting its "secret and political business." Although established by the Company, the Indian Foreign Department conducted business with foreign European powers. From the very beginning, a distinction was maintained between the foreign and political functions of the Foreign Department; relations with all "Asiatic powers" (including native princely states) were treated as political, while relations with European powers were treated as foreign.

In 1843, the Governor-General of India, Edward Law, 1st Earl of Ellenborough carried out administrative reforms, organizing the Secretariat of the Government into four departments: Foreign, Home, Finance, and Military. Each was headed by a secretary-level officer. The Foreign Department Secretary was entrusted with the "conduct of all correspondence belonging to the external and internal diplomatic relations of the government."

The Government of India Act 1935 attempted to delineate more clearly functions of the foreign and political wings of the Foreign Department, it was soon realized that it was administratively imperative to completely bifurcate the department. Consequently, the External Affairs Department was set up separately under the direct charge of the Governor-General.

The idea of establishing a separate diplomatic service to handle the external activities of the Government of India originated from a note dated 30 September 1944, recorded by Lieutenant-General T. J. Hutton, the Secretary of the Planning and Development Department. When this note was referred to the Department of External Affairs for comments, Olaf Caroe, the Foreign Secretary, recorded his comments in an exhaustive note detailing the scope, composition and functions of the proposed service. Caroe pointed out that as India emerged as autonomous, it was imperative to build up a system of representation abroad that would be in complete harmony with the objectives of the future government.

On 9 October 1946, the Indian government established the Indian Foreign Service for India's diplomatic, consular and commercial representation overseas. With independence, there was a near-complete transition of the Foreign and Political Department into what then became the new Ministry of External Affairs.

Indian Foreign Service Day is celebrated on 9 October every year since 2011 to honor the establishment of the Indian Foreign Service, the idea of which was proposed by diplomat Abhay K.

== Recruitment ==
Diplomatic Passport (left) and Official Passport (right). As opposed to ordinary deep blue passports, diplomatic passport is maroon-coloured with "Diplomatic Passport" engraved on it. Officials representing India other than IFS officers are usually given white-coloured Official Passports.

The officers of the Indian Foreign Service are recruited through Civil Services Examination by Union Public Service Commission for Group A and also through Staff Selection Commission for Group B.

In 1948, the first group of Indian Foreign Service officers were recruited based on the Civil Services Examination conducted by the Union Public Service Commission This exam is still used to select new foreign service officers. Previous to 1948, some were appointed directly by the Prime Minister and included former native rulers of India who had integrated their provinces into India.

Fresh recruits to the Indian Foreign Service are trained at Sushma Swaraj Foreign Service Institute (SSIFS) after a brief foundation course at the Lal Bahadur Shastri National Academy of Administration (LBSNAA). In recent years, the number of candidates selected to the Indian Foreign Service has averaged between 25 and 30 annually.

== Training ==
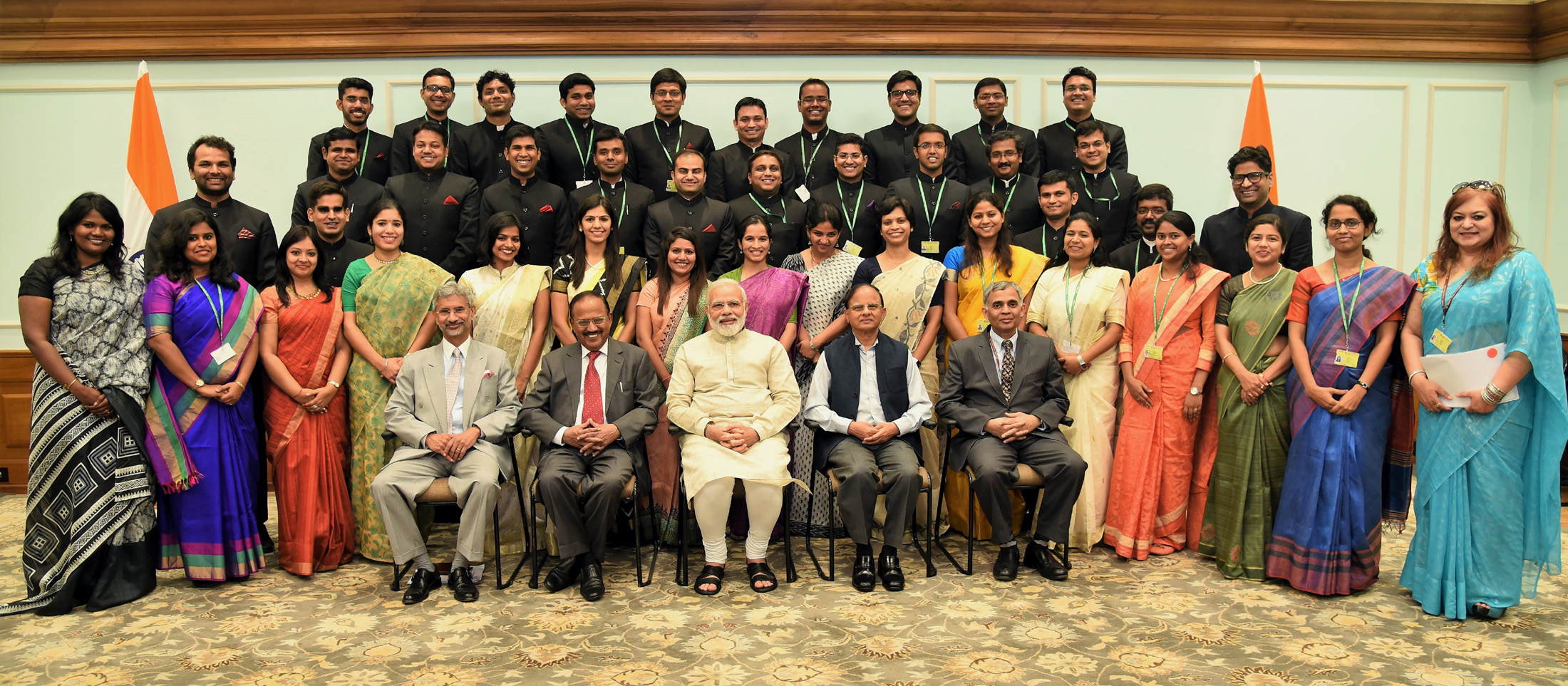
The Prime Minister, Shri Narendra Modi in a group photograph with the Indian Foreign Service (IFS) Officer Trainees, in New Delhi on May 02, 2017

On acceptance into the Foreign Service, new entrants undergo rigorous training, considered one of the most challenging and longest among Government of India services, typically lasting over one year. During the probationary period, these entrants are referred to as Officer Trainees. Training begins at the LBSNAA in Mussoorie, where members of other elite Indian civil services undergo a three-month Foundation Course, usually commencing in August each year.

Following the Foundation Course, probationers proceed to the SSIFS in New Delhi for intensive instruction in subjects essential to diplomacy, including international relations theory, military diplomacy, trade, India's foreign policy, history, international law, diplomatic practice, hospitality, protocol, and administration. After a brief desk attachment in the Ministry of External Affairs at the rank of Assistant Secretary, officers are posted to an Indian diplomatic mission abroad where their CFL is the native language.

Officer Trainees also undertake Armed Forces Attachments, each lasting at least one week, with various government bodies and defense establishments—such as the Indian Army (either in Jammu and Kashmir, or Ladakh, or Sikkim, or Arunachal Pradesh), Indian Navy (either in Mumbai or Visakhapatnam), Indian Air Force stations, and CAPF units.

In the middle phase of the program, participants are nominated for a State Attachment with a group of 5–7 officers in any state of India, for a duration of one week, to receive hands-on training in administrative functions. Additionally, participants are nominated for a Mission Attachment abroad, for one week, in an Indian Mission, to gain foundational exposure to the functioning of an embassy.

Language	Stations (Posted as Third Secretary)
Russian	Moscow (Russia)
French	Paris (France) , Brussels (Belgium) , Geneva (Switzerland)
Spanish	Madrid (Spain) , Mexico City, Buenos Aires (Argentina)
Chinese	Beijing (China)
Arabic	Cairo (Egypt) , Abu Dhabi (United Arab Emirates)
German	Berlin (Germany) , Vienna (Austria)
Japanese	Tokyo (Japan)
Hebrew	Tel Aviv (Israel)
Persian	Tehran (Iran)
Vietnamese	Hanoi (Vietnam)
Sinhalese	Colombo (Sri Lanka)
Nepali	Kathmandu (Nepal)
Dzongkha	Thimphu (Bhutan)
Turkish	Ankara (Turkey)
Pashto	Kabul (Afghanistan)
Korean	Seoul (South Korea)
Portuguese	Lisbon (Portugal) , Brasília (Brazil)
Bahasa	Jakarta (Indonesia) , Kuala Lumpur (Malaysia)

Additionally, they engage in 2–3 week Bharat Darshan tours, covering significant regions of India, including Kolkata, Darjeeling, Northeast India, Andaman and Nicobar Islands, Chennai, Thiruvananthapuram, Bangalore, Hyderabad, Puri, Mumbai, Rajasthan, Amritsar, Shimla, Kashmir and Ladakh.

The entire training program spans approximately 10-11 months and concludes with calls on VVIPs (President, Vice President, Prime Minister, External Affairs Minister, National Security Advisor and the Foreign Secretary) in the last week of the programme.

Upon completion of the training program, officers are assigned a compulsory foreign language (CFL) based on their rank in the UPSC CSE exam. Priority is given to UN languages, including Russian, French, Chinese, Spanish, and Arabic, as well as other languages such as German, Japanese, Hebrew, Persian, among others detailed below. UN languages, along with German and Japanese, are available every year, while other languages may be allocated depending on vacancies or typically after 2–3 years. There, they undergo language training and are expected to achieve proficiency, culminating in an examination conducted by the Ministry of Defence.

Successful completion of the language examination confirms the officer in service and leads to promotion to the rank of Second Secretary at the respective Indian embassy in the CFL country. Subsequent promotions and postings are generally based on performance rather than CFL and may include important diplomatic assignments in locations such as in the P-5 countries which are United States, Russia, China, United Kingdom and France, then comes the neighborhood countries of India (except China, which is already mentioned in P-5) like Pakistan, Afghanistan, Sri Lanka, Bangladesh, Bhutan, Nepal and Myanmar and then G4 nations which are Germany, Japan, and Brazil.

The following table categorizes some international cities according to the MEA classification system, ranging from A* (highest) to C*(NF) (lowest). Each category lists representative cities as per MEA guidelines.

A*	A	B	C	C* (Hard C)	C*(NF)
Washington DC, New York, Geneva, Tokyo	London, Paris, Madrid, Rome, Berlin, Dubai, Seoul	Moscow, Beijing, Tel Aviv, Shanghai, Warsaw, Buenos Aires, Colombo	Tehran, Cairo, Riyadh, Kyiv, Minsk	Islamabad, Dhaka, Beirut, Ulaanbaatar, Pyongyang	Kabul, Baghdad, Damascus

== Functions ==
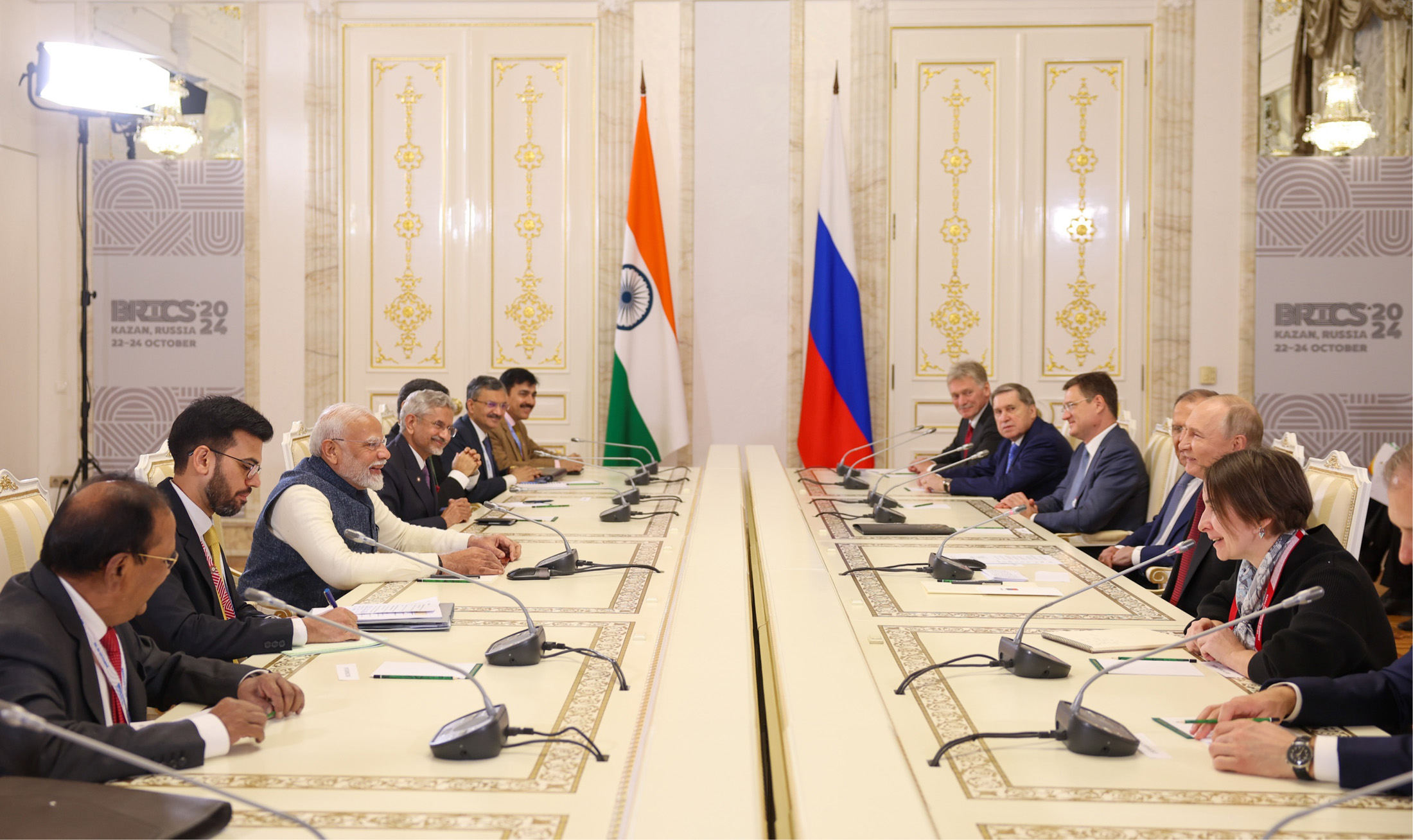
PM Narendra Modi and Indian Diplomats in a bilateral meeting with the President of Russian Federation, H.E. Vladimir Putin at Kazan, in Russia on October 22, 2024

As a career diplomat, the Foreign Service Officer is required to project India's interests, both at home and abroad on a wide variety of issues. These include bilateral political and economic cooperation, trade and investment promotion, cultural interaction, press and media liaison as well as a whole host of multilateral issues.

- Serving as India's Representative: Foreign Service Officers work in Indian Embassies, High Commissions, Consulates, and Permanent Missions to multilateral organizations like the UN, where they act as the official representatives of India.
- Protecting India's Interests: They are tasked with safeguarding and advancing India's national interests in the country where they are posted.
- Fostering Friendly Relations: Diplomats promote and cultivate friendly relations between India and the host country, including its people, as well as with Non-Resident Indians (NRI) and People of Indian Origin (PIO) communities.
- Accurate Reporting: Foreign Service Officers provide precise and timely reports on developments in the host country that may impact India's policies.
- Negotiating Agreements: They engage in negotiations with the authorities of the host country to establish agreements on a range of issues.
- Promoting Trade: They promote trade, business partnerships and investment promotion between India and the host country.
- Consular Services: Diplomats extend consular services to both foreign nationals in need and Indian citizens residing abroad, ensuring they receive necessary assistance and support.

== Career Progression ==
After successfully passing the UPSC CSE examination, a selected Indian Foreign Service Officer Trainee (OT) is initially appointed as an Assistant Secretary in any of the MEA, where the officer is required to execute assigned tasks within any division of the MEA. Upon completion of an initial training period of approximately two months, the officer is posted abroad as a Third Secretary at an Indian Embassy or Indian High Commission for language training. Typically, after 1 to 2 years, the officer is promoted to the rank of Second Secretary at the respective diplomatic mission, subject to successful completion of language training.

After a period of 3 to 4 years of service abroad, the officer is recalled to the MEA and appointed as an Under Secretary, where they serve in any bench of the respective division of the MEA.

Following 8 to 9 years of service, the officer is promoted to Deputy Secretary and may be posted either in the MEA under any division or abroad as a First Secretary.

After 12 to 13 years of service, the officer attains the rank of Director and may also be posted abroad as a Counsellor.

After 16 to 18 years of service, the Appointments Committee of the Cabinet (ACC) may empanel the officer at the rank of Joint Secretary, making them eligible for postings as either Deputy Chief of Mission or Deputy High Commissioner or Minister abroad. In some cases, they may also be eligible for postings as Ambassador/High Commissioner in some select countries. At this rank, officers serving in the MEA typically become the head of a division.

After 26 to 27 years of service, promotion to the rank of Additional Secretary is possible, enabling appointments as Ambassador or High Commissioner to neighbouring countries of India or the G4 countries. Officers at this rank may also become head of important divisions in the MEA, such as the Americas division. The primary eligibility criterion for this promotion is that the officer must have a minimum of two years of service remaining before retirement.

After 29 to 30 years of service, officers may be promoted by the Appointments Committee to the rank of Secretary, at which point they either serve as Ambassador or High Commissioner to P-5 countries or head the Secretary (East, West, South, ER, CPV) divisions in the MEA. The primary eligibility criterion for this promotion is that the officer must have a minimum of two years of service remaining before retirement, same as Additional Secretary.

The rank of Foreign Secretary is conferred only under specific conditions:

- The officer is the senior-most in the foreign service.
- The officer has completed over thirty years of service.
- The officer has undertaken exceptional and crucial work during their career.
- The officer has served as Ambassador or High Commissioner to at least one P-5 country.
- The officer has served one or more times in neighboring countries, including as an Ambassador or High Commissioner.
- The officer possesses the utmost level of integrity.

The decision of appointment to the post of Foreign Secretary is entirely at the discretion of the Appointments Committee of the Cabinet. In certain cases, the age of the officer is immaterial; for instance, S. Jaishankar, who joined the service at the age of 22, became Foreign Secretary, with only three days remaining before his retirement. Vinay Mohan Kwatra joined the service, even at the age of 26 and subsequently became Foreign Secretary. Conversely, many officers who joined at a young age, such as 23 or 24, did not attain this position, for not fulfilling the above conditions.

While higher studies, such as a Master's degree or Ph.D., are encouraged by the MEA to provide officers with a broader perspective, such qualifications do not influence promotion. For example, Harsh Vardhan Shringla holds only a B.A. degree and nevertheless became Foreign Secretary.

=== Rank Structure ===
In Indian missions abroad, the highest-ranking officials are the Heads of Missions, who holds the rank of ambassadors, high commissioners, and permanent representatives. They lead the various embassies, high commissions, and intergovernmental organisations worldwide. Heads of Posts are Consuls General who heads Consulate Generals in missions abroad. In MEA headquarters, the highest-ranking official among the secretaries is the Foreign Secretary.

Also in some cases, the senior most IFS officers also held the office of National Security Advisor (NSA) and also the Principal Secretary who have the rank even above the Cabinet Secretary and the Foreign Secretary.

The following is the structure of the Indian Foreign Service:

Ranks, designations, and positions held by Indian Foreign Service (IFS) officers in their career
Grade/Scale (Level on Pay Matrix)	Posting at Embassies / High Commissions / Permanent Missions	Posting at Consulates	Posting at the Ministry of External Affairs	Position on order of precedence in India	Pay Scale (Basic Pay)
Administrative Head (Pay level 17)	—	—	Foreign Secretary	23* (Note: Foreign Secretary is the senior-most career diplomat and the administrative head of the Ministry of External Affairs (India), and is equivalent to Secretary to the Government of India.)	₹225,000 (US$2,400)
Apex scale (Pay level 17)	Ambassador / High Commissioner / Permanent Representative to the United Nations or other international organisations	—	Secretary	23	₹225,000 (US$2,400)
Higher Administrative Grade (Pay level 15)	Ambassador / High Commissioner / Permanent Representative to the United Nations or other international organisations	—	Additional Secretary	25	₹182,200 (US$1,900)—₹224,100 (US$2,400)
Senior Administrative Grade (Pay level 14)	Ambassador/ High Commissioner/ Minister / Deputy Chief of Mission	Consul General	Joint Secretary	26	₹144,200 (US$1,500)—₹218,200 (US$2,300)
Selection Grade (Pay level 13)	Counsellor	Deputy Consul General	Director		₹123,100 (US$1,300)—₹215,900 (US$2,300)
Junior Administrative Grade (Pay level 12)	First Secretary	Consul	Deputy Secretary		₹78,800 (US$840)—₹209,200 (US$2,200)
Senior Time Scale (Pay level 11)	Second Secretary	Consul	Under Secretary		₹67,700 (US$720)—₹208,700 (US$2,200)
Junior Time Scale (Pay level 10)	Third Secretary	Vice Consul	Assistant Secretary		₹56,100 (US$600)—₹177,500 (US$1,900)

Note: Apart from the basic pay, IFS officers posted in missions abroad are entitled to a Foreign Allowance, which is determined and revised periodically by the MEA. Based on various sources, it is estimated that the starting gross monthly remuneration (Basic Pay + Foreign Allowance + other admissible allowances) of an IFS officer posted abroad begins at a minimum of $4,000 per month at the rank of Third Secretary, and progressively increases to a minimum of $9,500 per month at the rank of Ambassador.

When IFS officers are posted in India, their monthly pay is mostly the same as that of an IAS officer of the same rank in the Ministry of External Affairs, although certain allowances may differ.

Note: Even at the Joint Secretary rank, some IFS officers may be appointed as Ambassador or High Commissioner to foreign countries (except the P-5 countries), provided there is a vacancy. In some instances, even at the rank of Director, an IFS officer may be appointed as an Ambassador.

Note: Any IFS officer may express a preference for their posting, either abroad or within the MEA. Generally, officers are assigned to their preferred postings whenever possible. However, if there are limited or no vacancies available for the desired posting, the final decision regarding the assignment rests with the Foreign Service Board (FSB). This provides an advantage over the All India Services officers like the IAS and IPS, where postings are determined at the discretion of the service authorities and are not necessarily aligned with the officers’ preferences.

=== Deputation ===
An Indian Foreign Service (IFS) officer is eligible for deputation to various central government organizations, including the President's Secretariat, Prime Minister's Office, National Defence College, National Security Council Secretariat, any ministry of the Government of India, Department of Space, Department of Atomic Energy, Lok Sabha Secretariat, Cabinet Secretariat and other organizations in accordance with the central government deputation rules.

IFS officers can also be inducted into the Research & Analysis Wing (R&AW), the Intelligence Bureau (IB), the National Investigation Agency (NIA) and other intelligence agencies either on a temporary basis or permanently as intelligence officers.

IFS officers may also be posted to Regional Passport Offices in any state of India as the Passport Officer. Additionally, there are several branch secretariats of the Ministry of External Affairs (MEA) in cities such as Kolkata, Mumbai, Chennai, Guwahati, and Hyderabad where IFS officers can be assigned. Certain institutes, including the SSIFS and the ICWA, also offer deputation opportunities for IFS officers.

Unlike the Indian Administrative Service (IAS), IFS officers do not usually serve in state deputation; however, there are rare instances where officers have been posted to state governments, although significant barriers exist in this regard.

== Major concerns and reforms ==
=== Understaffed ===
India has one of the most understaffed diplomatic forces of any major country in the world. Based on 2014 calculations there are about 2,700 "diplomatic rank" officers in overseas missions and at headquarters. A minority of the diplomatic officers are Foreign Service (A) officers, the senior cadre of Indian diplomacy, which is primarily drawn from direct recruitment through the Civil Services Examination. Although sanctioned strength was 912, the actual strength of Group A was 770 officers in 2014. In addition there were in 2014, 252 Grade-I officers of Indian Foreign Service (B) General Cadre who after promotion are inducted into Indian Foreign Service (A). The lower grades of the Indian Foreign Service(B) General Cadre included 635 attachés. The breakdown of other cadres and personnel included 540 secretarial staff, 33 from the Interpreters Cadre, 24 from the Legal and Treaties Cadre, and 310 personnel from other Ministries.

Shashi Tharoor, then chairman of Committee on External Affairs in 16th Lok Sabha had presented the 12th report for expanding and building the numbers, quality and capacity of India's diplomats.

In March 2023, Parliamentary Committee on External Affairs criticized the service for being severely short-staffed and under-budgeted. In its Demand for Grants (2023–24) report, the committee highlighted that the cadre strength of Indian Foreign Service Officers is only 1,011 which is just 22.5 percent of the total strength. Out of IFS 'A' cadre, 667 are posted at diplomatic missions across the world and 334 are manning the headquarters in Delhi, which at present has 57 divisions.

=== Declining prestige and quality ===
Since its inception and especially in the early decades of the service, the Indian Foreign Service had a reputation for attracting the country's most talented civil service aspirants. The quality of candidates based on exam rank has significantly declined and the quality of candidates has created concerns about harm to prestige in expanding the size of the service.

In the 1960s and 1970s, exam toppers generally in the top 20 opted for the Indian Foreign Service over the Indian Administrative Service and Indian Police Service, the other elite civil services. By late 1980s, the dip was appreciable and Indian Foreign Service spots did not fill until reaching much deeper down the list. The Indian Foreign Service continues in recent years to have difficulty in attracting the most promising candidates. For the 2017 Civil Services Exam, only 5 of the top 100 candidates chose the Indian Foreign Service with the last ranking person from the General Category in the 152nd position. For candidates with reservation status, a candidate from the Scheduled Castes and Scheduled Tribes in the 640th position closed the list for Indian Foreign Service. The Indian Foreign Service has become less attractive due to higher pay in corporate jobs, other elite civil services like the All India Services promising more power, and fading glamour as foreign travel became common place.

A parliamentary committee reviewing Indian Foreign Service reform in 2016 feared a negative feedback loop with the "deterioration" in candidate quality as both a "both a symptom and a reason for the erosion of prestige in the Indian Foreign Service". However, the committee was hard pressed to address the issue because it was also concerned about increasing the "quantity" of Indian diplomats. T. P. Sreenivasan, a retired Foreign Service officer, argued in 2015 that "elitism should be preserved" for the Indian Foreign Service to perform effectively. He further lamented the Indian Foreign Service "is already a shadow of its former self" which dissuaded aspirants and the service needed to have its "attractiveness enhanced".

== Indian Foreign Service, Branch B ==
The Indian Foreign Service (Branch B), or IFS (B), has one cadre: the General cadre. Recruitments are made through separate competitive exams, named Combined Graduate Level Examination (CGLE), conducted by the Staff Selection Commission (SSC). For distinction, the IFS is mostly referred to as IFS (Group A) by the media and general public. Until 2009, the General cadre and Stenographers' cadre personnel were absorbed into IFS after serving a prescribed number of years. Officers from cadre who had joined IFS reached up to the post of ambassador. In 2009, the path to promotion to IFS was closed for the Stenographers cadre.

General cadre
Grade	Designation		Classification	Character	Pay Matrix
Grade	Headquarters	Abroad	Classification	Character	Pay Matrix
Grade I	Under secretary	First secretary Second secretary	Group A	Non-ministerial	Level 11
Integrated Grade II & III	Section officer attaché	Vice-consul; Registrar	Group B	Ministerial	Level 8
Grade IV	Assistant	Assistant	Group B	Ministerial	Level 7
Grade V	Upper division clerk	Upper division clerk	Group C	Ministerial	Level 4
Grade VI	Lower division clerk	Lower division clerk	Group C	Ministerial	Level 2
Cypher sub-cadre
Grade I	Cypher assistant	Cypher assistant	Group B	Ministerial	Level 7

Stenographers' cadre
Grade	Designation	Classification	Character	Pay Matrix
	Principal staff officer	Group A	Ministerial	Level 13
	Senior principal private secretary	Group A	Ministerial	Level 12
Grade A	Principal private secretary	Group A	Ministerial	Level 11
Grade B	Private secretary	Group B	Ministerial	Level 8
Grade C	Personal assistant	Group B	Ministerial	Level 7
Grade D	Stenographer	Group C	Ministerial	Level 4

In 2012, a counsellor at the high commission of India in Fiji, originally from the Stenographer's cadre, who had not joined the IFS was appointed as ambassador to North Korea. A senior MEA official said, they had no choice since no one from the IFS had wanted the posting in Pyongyang. Three IFS (B) general cadre associations protested by writing to the Prime Minister's Office and the MEA, requesting to review the appointment. According to a senior MEA official, this was not the first time such appointments had occurred, mentioning past instances from the Interpreters' cadre and Cypher sub-cadre, and also recalled a previous appointment from the Stenographers' cadre as an ambassador in North Korea.

== Notable Indian Foreign Service Officers ==
- Ajay Bisaria
- Asaf Ali, former Governor of Odisha
- Abhay K
- Abid Hasan, a former officer of Indian National Army
- Arundhati Ghose
- Ausaf Sayeed
- Benegal Rama Rau, 4th Governor of Reserve Bank of India
- Brajesh Mishra, 1st National Security Advisor
- Binay Ranjan Sen, Director General of FAO (1956–67)
- C. B. Muthamma
- Chokila Iyer, 23rd Foreign Secretary of India
- Dnyaneshwar Mulay, former member of National Human Rights Commission
- Gaitri Issar Kumar, Former High Commissioner to the United Kingdom
- Gautam Bambawale, former ambassador to China and Pakistan
- Gopalaswami Parthasarathy, former Vice-chancellor of Jawaharlal Nehru University
- Hamid Ansari, former Vice President of India (2007–17)
- Hardeep Singh Puri, current cabinet minister (2014–present)
- Harsh Vardhan Shringla, former Foreign Secretary of India
- J N Dixit, 2nd National Security Advisor & former Foreign Secretary
- Jitender Pal Singh, Ambassador of India to Israel
- Kamlesh Sharma, former Commonwealth Secretary-General
- Kanwal Sibal, former Foreign Secretary
- Kewal Singh, former Foreign Secretary
- K. M. Panikkar
- K.P.S. Menon
- K. R. Narayanan, 10th President of India and 9th Vice President of India
- K. Raghunath, former Foreign Secretary
- Lakshmi Kant Jha, 8th Governor of Reserve Bank of India
- Lalit Mansingh
- Maharaja Krishna Rasgotra
- Mani Shankar Aiyar
- Meira Kumar, 15th Speaker of the Lok Sabha (2009–14)
- Nalin Surie
- Natarajan Krishnan, President of the UNSC
- Natwar Singh, former Minister of External Affairs
- Nirupama Rao, former Foreign Secretary
- Pankaj Saran, former Deputy National Security Advisor
- Parvathaneni Harish, Permanent Representative of India to the United Nations
- Pavan Kapoor, currently serving as one of the Deputy National Security Advisor of India
- Periasamy Kumaran, current High Commissioner of India to the United Kingdom
- Pranay Kumar Verma, current Ambassador of India to Belgium and the European Union
- Rahul Shrivastava, current Indian High Commissioner to Namibia
- Randhir Jaiswal, current Official Spokesperson of the Ministry of External Affairs
- Ranjan Mathai, former Foreign Secretary
- Raveesh Kumar
- Riva Ganguly Das, former High Commissioner to Bangladesh
- Romesh Bhandari, former Foreign Secretary, Lieutenant Governor of Delhi and the Andaman and Nicobar Islands, and Governor of Tripura, Goa and Uttar Pradesh
- Ronen Sen, former Ambassador to USA, UK, Russia, Germany and South Korea
- Ruchi Ghanashyam, Former High Commissioner to the United Kingdom
- Ruchira Kamboj, 1st women Permanent Representatives of India to the UN
- Salman Haider, former Foreign Secretary
- Sanjeev Singla, current Ambassador of India to France
- Shashank
- Shivshankar Menon, 4th National Security Advisor
- Shyam Saran, 26th Foreign Secretary of India
- Sibi George, current Secretary (West) of the MEA
- Subimal Dutt, 3rd Foreign Secretary of India
- Subrahmanyam Jaishankar, Minister of External Affairs (2019–present)
- Sujata Mehta, former member of the Union Public Service Commission
- Sujatha Singh, 30th Foreign Secretary
- Syed Akbaruddin, former India's Permanent Representative to the UN
- Taranjit Singh Sandhu, current Lieutenant Governor of Delhi and former Indian Ambassador to the United States
- T. N. Kaul
- T. S. Tirumurti
- Venu Rajamony
- Vijay K. Nambiar, Chef de Cabinet of the United Nations (2007–12)
- Vijay Keshav Gokhale, 32nd Foreign Secretary of India
- Vikram Doraiswami, current Ambassador of India to China
- Vikram Misri, Deputy National Security Advisor (1 January 2022 - 14 July 2024) & 35th Foreign Secretary of India
- Vikas Swarup, eminent writer
- Vinay Kumar, current Ambassador of India to Russia
- Vinay Mohan Kwatra, current ambassador of India to the United States and 34th Foreign Secretary
- Yashvardhan Kumar Sinha, former Chief Information Commissioner of India

== See also ==
- Indian Foreign Policy
- Ministry of External Affairs
- External Affairs Minister
- Foreign Secretary of India
- List of ambassadors and high commissioners of India
- List of ambassadors and high commissioners to India
