= List of high commissioners of India to Bangladesh =

High Commissioner of India to Bangladesh
- Logo of Indian High Commission

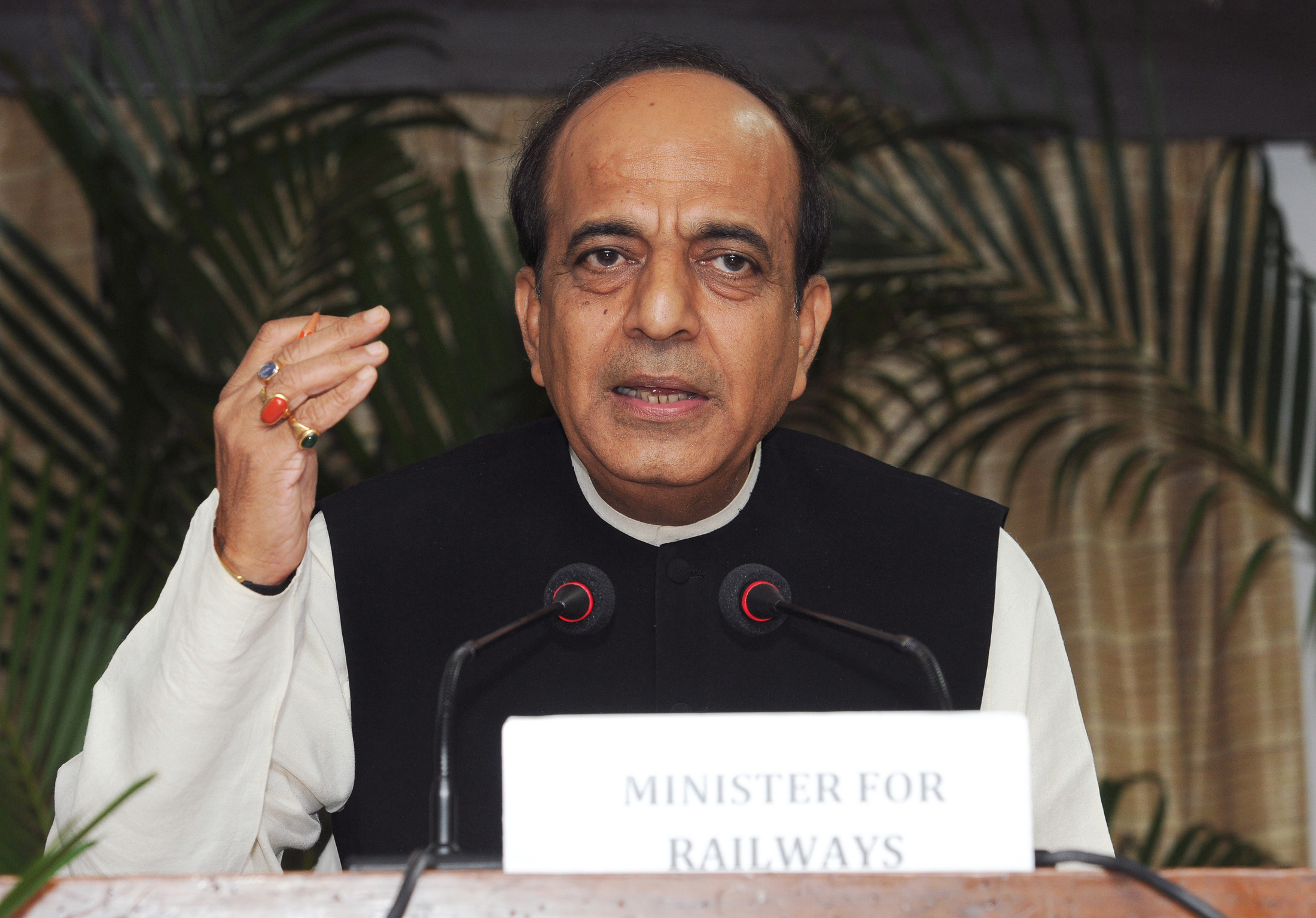
- Incumbent; Dinesh Trivedi since 25 June 2026
- Ministry of External Affairs
- Style: His Excellency
- Residence: Baridhara, Dhaka
- Seat: High Commission of India, Dhaka
- Nominator: Droupadi Murmu
- Appointer: Ministry of External Affairs
- Term length: No fixed tenure
- Inaugural holder: Subimal Dutt
- Formation: 1971
- Deputy: Mr. Pawan Badhe, IFS
- Website: Embassy of India, Dhaka; High Commissioner of India, Dhaka

The high commissioner of India to the People's Republic of Bangladesh is the chief diplomatic representative of India to Bangladesh. The high commission is located in the Diplomatic enclave of Baridhara, Dhaka.

The high commission is headed by the High commissioner, while four other Assistant High Commissions of India are located in four major cities of the country, which are headed by an Assistant High Commissioner.

== List of Indian high commissioners to Bangladesh ==
The following IFS officers have served as High Commissioners of India to Bangladesh.

Name	Took office	Left office	Notes
Subimal Dutt	February 1972	June 1974	3rd Foreign Secretary of India
Samar Sen	July 1974	November 1976	
K. P. S. Menon Jr.	January 1977	September 1979	
Muchkund Dubey	October 1979	October 1982	
I. P. Khosla	November 1982	August 1985	
Indrajit Singh Chadha	October 1985	February 1989	
Krishnan Srinivasan	February 1989	March 1992	former Commonwealth Deputy Secretary-General of Political Affair; 19th Foreign Secretary of India
K. Raghunath	April 1992	March 1995	
Deb Mukherjee	April 1995	July 2000	
M. L. Tripathi	July 2000	October 2003	
Veena Sikri	December 2003	November 2006	
P. R. Chakraborty	January 2007	December 2009	
Rajeet Mitter	December 2009	October 2011	
Pankaj Saran	March 2012	December 2015	current Deputy National Security Adviser (since 2018)
Harsh Vardhan Shringla	January 2016	January 2019	Former Ambassador of India to the United States; 33rd Foreign Secretary of India
Riva Ganguly Das	1 March 2019	12 August 2020	
Vikram Doraiswami	12 August 2020	20 September 2022	High Commissioner of India to the United Kingdom (September 2022 – March 2026); Ambassador of India to China (March 2026 – Incumbent)
Pranay Kumar Verma	21 September 2022	9 April 2026	Ambassador to Belgium & European Union
Dinesh Trivedi	25 June 2026		Member of Parliament, Lok Sabha (2009–2019); MoS of Ministry of Health and Family Welfare (2009–2012); Mininster of Railways (2011-2012); Member of Parliament, Rajya Sabha (1990–1996; 2002–2008; 2020–2021)

=== Assistant High Commissioners ===
Alongside that there are 4 Assistant High Commissioners, appointed in four cities: Chittagong, Khulna, Rajshahi, and Sylhet.

City	Current Assistant High Commissioner	Location	Website
Chittagong	Dr. Rajeev Ranjan	2111, Zakir Hossain Road, Khulshi	AHCI Chittagong
Rajshahi	Manoj Kumar	House no. 284/2, Housing Estate, Sapura	AHCI Rajshahi
Khulna	Inder Jit Sagar	House no. 65, Shamshur Rahman Road, Khulna	AHCI Khulna
Sylhet	Chander Shekhar	House no. 40, Road no. 2, Block-E, Shah Jalal Upa Sahar	AHCI Sylhet

== See also ==
- High Commission of India, Dhaka
- Ambassadors of Bangladesh
