= List of ambassadors of India to Japan =

Ambassador of India to Japan
- Emblem of India

- Flag of India

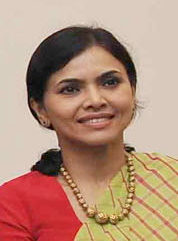
- Incumbent; Nagma Mallick since October 2025
- Style: Her Excellency
- Nominator: Droupadi Murmu
- Inaugural holder: K. K. Chettur
- Formation: 7 May 1952
- Website: Embassy of India, Tokyo, Japan

The Indian Ambassador to Japan is the chief diplomatic representative of India to Japan.

== List of Indian Ambassadors to Japan ==
The chiefs of the Indian diplomatic mission to Japan are:

=== Head of the Indian Liaison Mission in Tokyo and Political Representative of India with the Supreme Commander Allied Powers in Japan ===
S. No.	Name	Date charge assumed	Date charge relinquished	Duration in post
1	Benegal Rama Rau	1947	1948	1 year
2	Birendra Narayan Chakraborty	1948	1949	1 year
3	Krishna Krishna Chettur	8 March 1950	28 April 1952	2 years, 1 month and 20 days

=== Ambassador of India to Japan ===
S. No.	Name	Date charge assumed	Date charge relinquished	Duration in post
1	Krishna Krishna Chettur	7 May 1952	August 1952	3 months
2	M. A. Rauf	16 October 1952	May 1954	1 year, 7 months
3	Binay Ranjan Sen	17 February 1955	September 1956	1 year, 7 months
4	Chandra Shekhar Jha	4 May 1957	7 January 1959	1 year, 8 months and 3 days
5	Chandeshwar Prasad Narayan Singh	19 February 1959	1 February 1960	11 months and 13 days
6	Lalji Mehrotra	19 July 1960	21 December 1964	4 years, 5 months and 2 days
7	Badruddin Tyabji	21 March 1965	4 July 1967	2 years, 3 months and 13 days
8	S. K. Banerji	11 November 1967	2 July 1970	2 years, 7 months and 21 days
9	V. H. Coelho	5 July 1970	26 November 1972	2 years, 4 months and 21 days
10	S. T. Than	27 December 1972	30 June 1975	2 years, 6 months and 3 days
11	Eric Gonsalves	11 September 1975	17 June 1978	2 years, 9 months and 6 days
12	Avtar Singh	25 June 1978	31 October 1979	1 year, 4 months and 6 days
13	V. K. Ahuja	29 December 1979	8 November 1980	10 months and 10 days
14	K. P. S. Menon Jr.	31 August 1981	19 January 1985	3 years, 4 months and 19 days
15	Anantanarayanan Madhavan	13 April 1985	7 May 1988	3 years and 24 days
16	Arjun G. Asrani	8 June 1988	31 July 1992	4 years, 1 month and 23 days
17	Prakash Shah	28 October 1992	31 January 1995	2 years, 3 months and 3 days
18	Kuldip Sahdev	2 March 1995	31 March 1997	2 years and 29 days
19	Siddharth Singh	4 May 1997	14 September 2000	3 years, 4 months and 10 days
20	Aftab Seth	28 September 2000	30 September 2003	3 years and 2 days
21	Mani Lal Tripathi	16 November 2003	30 April 2006	2 years, 5 months and 14 days
22	Hemant Krishan Singh	1 June 2006	31 December 2010	4 years, 6 months and 30 days
23	Alok Prasad	9 February 2011	30 June 2012	1 year, 4 months and 21 days
24	Deepa Gopalan Wadhwa	8 August 2012	30 November 2015	3 years, 3 months and 22 days
25	Sujan R. Chinoy	3 December 2015	30 November 2018	2 years, 11 months and 27 days
26	Sanjay Kumar Verma	5 May 2019	31 October 2022	3 years, 5 months and 26 days
27	Sibi George	1 November 2022	9 September 2025	2 years, 10 months and 8 days

== See also ==
- India–Japan relations
