= Permanent Representative of India to the United Nations in Geneva =

Permanent Representative of India to the UN and other International Organizations in Geneva
- Emblem of India

- Flag of India

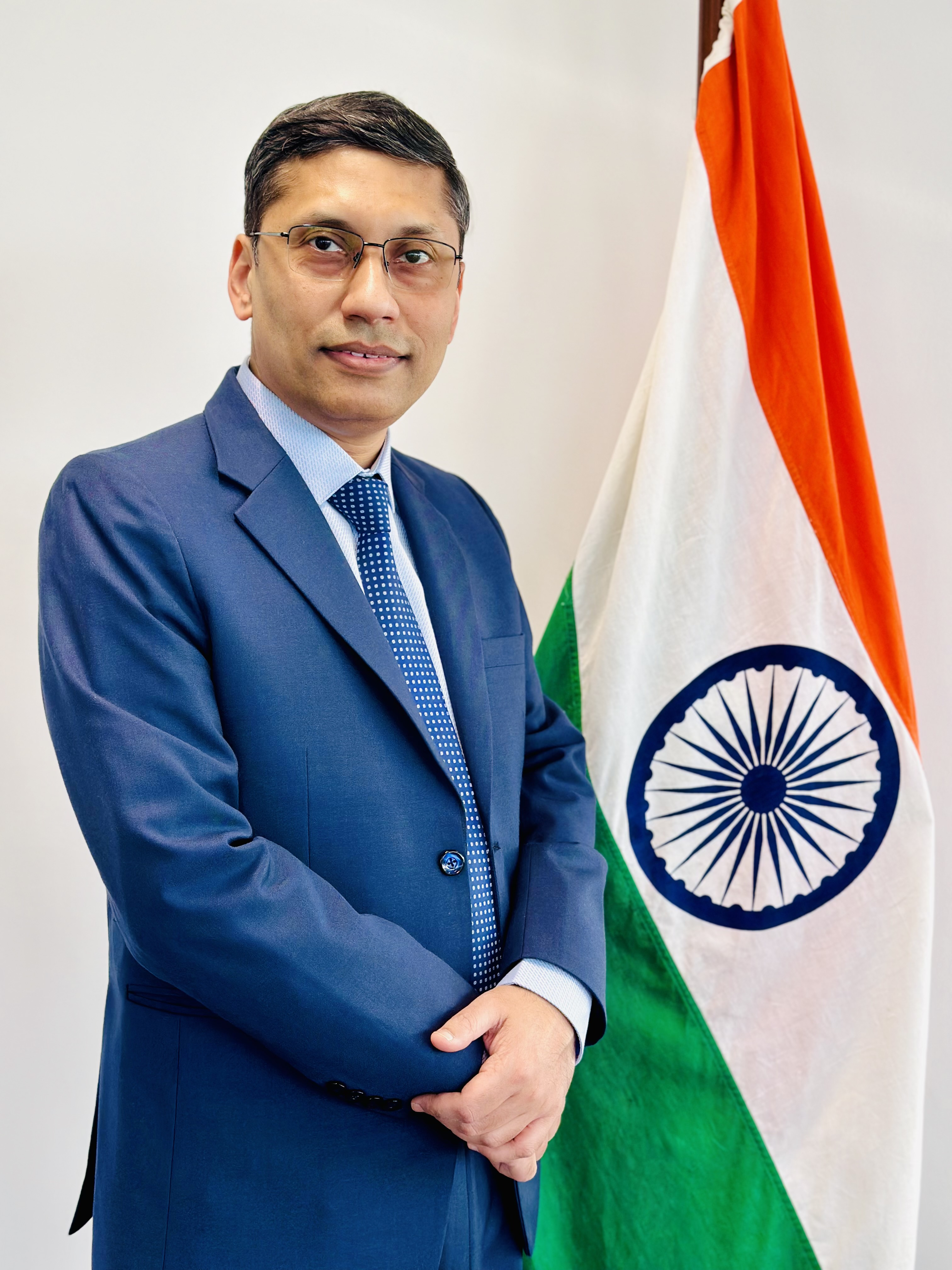
- Incumbent; Arindam Bagchi since 20 January 2024
- Ministry of External Affairs; Permanent Mission of India in Geneva
- Style: His or Her Excellency (formal); Mr. or Madam Ambassador (informal)
- Member of: Indian Foreign Service
- Reports to: Ministry of External Affairs
- Appointer: President of India
- Deputy: Deputy Permanent Representative of India to the UN and other International Organizations in Geneva
- Website: pmindiaun.gov.in

The Ambassador and Permanent Representative of India to the UN and other International Organizations in Geneva is the head of the Permanent Mission of India in Geneva which represents India at the United Nations Office at Geneva and other international organizations in Geneva, Switzerland.

== List ==
This is a list of Indian permanent representative to the United Nations Office at Geneva.

S. No.	Name	Entered office	Left office
1	Samar Sen	June 1953	October 1955
2	Kottakaran Vadagarakaran Padmanabhan	1955	1958
3	Amrik Singh Mehta	Feb 1959	?
4	K. P. Lukose	April 1964	March 1967
5	Natarajan Krishnan	April 1967	August 1971
6	Purnendu Kumar Banerjee	August 1971	August 1973
7	Brajesh Chandra Mishra	September 1973	December 1976
8	Chinmaya Rajaninath Gharekhan	March 1977	May 1980
9	Ayilam Panchapakesa Venkateswaran	May 1980	August 1982
10	Muchkund Dubey	November 1982	September 1985
11	Alfred S. Gonsalves	October 1985	August 1986
12	Jaskaran Singh Teja	August 1986	August 1988
13	Kamalesh Sharma	September 1988	May 1990
14	Indrajit Singh Chadha	May 1990	July 1991
15	Prakash Shah	August 1991	October 1992
16	Satish Chandra	October 1992	July 1995
17	Arundhati Ghose	July 1995	November 1997
18	Savitri Kunadi	January 1998	February 2002
19	Hardeep Singh Puri	March 2002	October 2005
20	Swashpawan Singh	December 2005	December 2008
21	Achamkulangare Gopinathan	January 2009	December 2011
22	Dilip Sinha	March 2012	November 2014
23	Ajit Kumar	March 2015	2017
24	Rajiv K Chander	April 2017	August 2020
25	Indra Mani Pandey	September 2020	December 2023
26	Arindam Bagchi	20 January 2024	Incumbent

== See also ==
- Permanent Representative of India to the United Nations
- India and the United Nations
- Official Spokesperson of the Ministry of External Affairs (India)
- List of current permanent representatives to the United Nations
- Foreign relations of India
- Diplomatic missions of India
