= Veena Sikri =

Indian diplomat and former High Commissioner of India to Bangladesh

Her Excellency Veena Sikri IFS

Ambassador of India to Malaysia
- In office 2000–2003
- Preceded by: P. S. Sahai
- Succeeded by: R. L. Narayan

High Commissioner of India to Bangladesh
- In office 2003–2006
- Preceded by: M. L. Tripathi
- Succeeded by: Pinak Ranjan Chakravarty

Personal details
- Born: 27 October 1948 (age 77)
- Occupation: Indian Foreign Service

Veena Sikri is a retired Indian diplomat, academic, and former High Commissioner of India to Bangladesh, a role that she is the only woman to have performed. She is a professor at Jamia Millia Islamia, a university in New Delhi.

== Early life ==
Sikri graduated from St. Mary's School, Pune in 1963. She completed her bachelor's degree in statistics from the University of Pune in 1967. She completed her masters of economics from Delhi University in 1970.

== Career ==
Sikri joined the Indian Foreign Service in 1971. From 1977 to 1981, she was stationed at the Permanent Mission of India to the United Nations.

From 1989 to 1992, Sikri was the Director General of the Indian Council for Cultural Relations.

Sikri was the Consul General of India in Hong Kong from 1996 to 2000.

From 2000 to 2003, Sikri was the High Commissioner of India to Malaysia. She was appointed the High Commissioner of India to Bangladesh in 2003. She resigned from the Indian Foreign Service on 26 September 2006 after her junior Shiv Shankar Menon was appointed Foreign Secretary of India by Prime Minister Manmohan Singh. Her husband Rajiv Sikri. also an officer of the same batch as her, resigned from the Indian Foreign Service for the same reason earlier.

From 2008 to 2011, Sikri was a visiting researcher at the Institute of Southeast Asian Studies based in Singapore. She is the Vice Chairperson of the India chapter of the South Asia Foundation. She co-edited Contemporarising Tagore and the World with Muchkund Dubey and Imtiaz Ahmed.

Sikri is the chairperson of the Bangladesh Studies program at the Academy of International Studies of Jamia Millia Islamia and endowed by the Ford Foundation. She is the convenor of South Asia Women Network. In 2014, she credited Prime Minister Sheikh Hasina for removing terrorism from Bangladesh and called for out of the box thinking for removing problems between India and Bangladesh.

In January 2024, Sikri said Bangladesh Nationalist Party boycotting the general election would not harm the legitimacy of the election. She appreciated the Indian government maintaining a neutral position during the 2024 Quota reform movement in Bangladesh.

== Personal life ==
Sikri's husband, Rajiv Sikri, was also a diplomat of India.
