= Jyotindra Nath Dixit =

Indian diplomat and former National security advisor (1936–2005)

2nd National Security Advisor of India
- In office 23 May 2004 – 3 January 2005
- Prime Minister: Manmohan Singh
- Preceded by: Brajesh Mishra
- Succeeded by: M. K. Narayanan

18th Foreign Secretary of India
- In office 1 December 1991 – 31 January 1994
- Prime Minister: P. V. Narasimha Rao
- Preceded by: Muchukund Dubey
- Succeeded by: Krishnan Srinivasan

Personal details
- Born: 8 January 1936 Madras, Madras Presidency, father Munshi Paramu Pillai
- Died: 3 January 2005 (aged 68) New Delhi, India
- Spouse: Vijaya Lakshmi Sundaram
- Children: 5
- Parent(s): Munshi Paramu Pillai (father); Retnamayi Devi (mother)
- Education: Zakir Hussain College; Delhi University; Jawaharlal Nehru University
- Occupation: Diplomat

Jyotindra Nath Dixit (8 January 1936 – 3 January 2005) was an Indian diplomat of Indian Foreign Service , who served as the National Security Advisor of India to the Prime Minister Manmohan Singh and is mostly remembered for his role as a negotiator in disputes with Pakistan and China. He also served as Foreign Secretary (1991–1994), the highest bureaucratic post in the Ministry of External Affairs.

== Early life and education ==
Born in Madras (present-day Chennai, India) to Malayali Nair parents, famous Malayali writer Munshi Paramu Pillai and Retnamayi Devi. He got his surname, Dixit, from his stepfather Sitaram Dixit, a freedom fighter and journalist.

He did his schooling in Central India, Rajasthan and Delhi. thereafter he did BA Honours Degree in Philosophy, Economics and Political Science the Zakir Husain College Delhi University(1952 Batch), then he did his Master's in international law and international relations from Delhi University, and pursued studies for Doctoral Degree at the Indian School of International Studies, now part of Jawaharlal Nehru University.

== Career ==
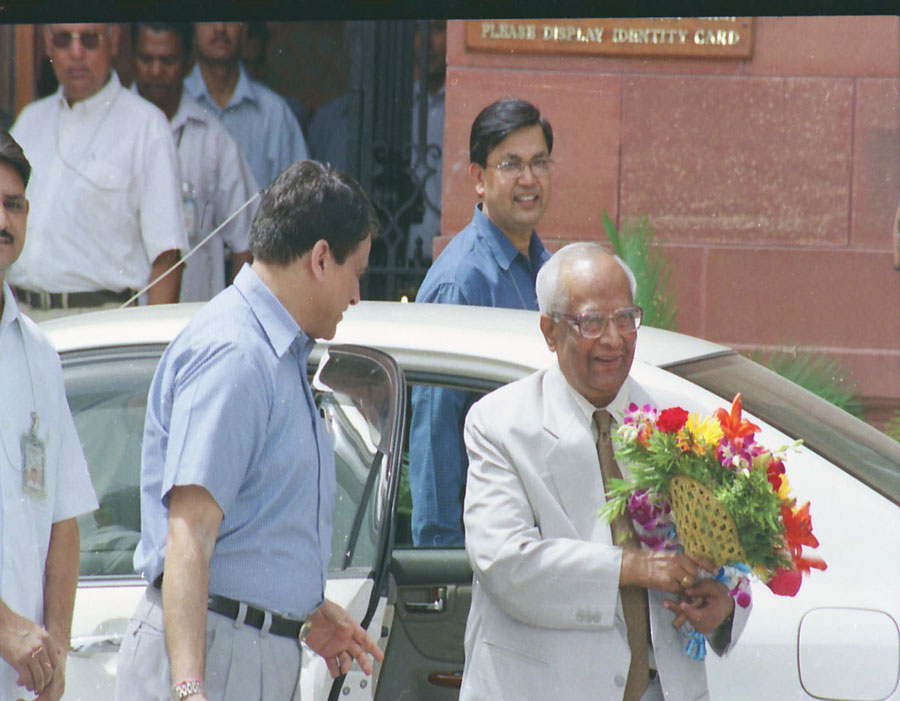
Dixit on his arrival at South Block to take charge as 'National Security Adviser' in New Delhi on 27 May 2004

Dixit joined the Indian Foreign Service in 1958, and served in Vienna, Austria. He became India's Deputy High Commissioner to Bangladesh (1971–74) after its liberation. Subsequently, he served as Deputy Chief of Mission at the Embassies in Tokyo and Washington, followed by Ambassador in Chile, Mexico (1960-1961 3rd Secretary), Japan, Australia, Afghanistan (1980–85); High Commissioner Sri Lanka (1985–89) and Pakistan (1989–91). He was Chief administrator of Indian aid in Bhutan.

He later served as the Indian Foreign Secretary from 1991 and ultimately retired from Government service in 1994. He was also a representative of India to the United Nations, UNIDO, UNESCO, ILO and Non-Aligned Movement (NAM). He was a member of the first National Security Advisory Board. He was also the author of several books. He was the High Commissioner in Colombo in 1987 when India signed an accord with Sri Lanka government and deployed of the Indian Peace Keeping Force (IPKF) to the Tamil area in the island nation at the height of ethnic crisis.

He succeeded to the post of the National Security Advisor in 2004. His columns on international and regional affairs, appeared regularly in various publications including Outlook and Indian Express. He remained a visiting lecturer at many educational institutions.

== Personal life and death ==
Dixit died in harness as the National Security Advisor on 3 January 2005, in New Delhi, after suffering a heart attack. He was married to Vijaya Lakshmi Dixit (née Sundaram) and had five children- Ashok Dixit married to Manda Dixit, (Late) Rahul Dixit married to Rupa Dixit, Aabha Dixit married to V.B (Anand) Dhavle, Dipa Dixit married to Rajiv Shakdher and (Late) Dhruv Dixit. Five grandchildren: Abhishek Dhavle, Jaidev Dhavle (twins of Aabha and Anand), Sumiran Dixit and Sagiri Dixit (children of Rahul and Rupa), Sangamitra Dixit (Daughter of Ashok and Manda) and Vasudhaa Shakdher (Daughter of Dipa and Rajiv). Vijaya Lakshmi Dixit died in 1999 in New Delhi. Mr J.N Dixit married a second time. He was the first National Security Advisor who died in office.

== Awards and honours ==
India's second highest civilian award, the Padma Vibhushan, was posthumously conferred on J N Dixit in 2005.

== Works ==
- Self in Autumn, 1982 (collection of poems)
- Anatomy of a Flawed Inheritance: A Survey of Indo–Pak Relations 1970–94, Konark Publishers, 1995
- My South Block Years, UBS publishers
- Assignment Colombo, Konark Publishers, 1997.
- Across Borders: Fifty Years of India's Foreign Policy, PICUS Publishers. 1998.
- Liberation and Beyond: Indo-Bangladesh Relations 1971–99, Konark Publishers. 1999.
- An Afghom: Diary-Zahir Shah to Taliban, Konark Publishers, 2000.
- Indian Foreign Policies and its Neighbours, Gyan Books, New Delhi, 2001. ISBN 81-212-0726-6.
- India’s Foreign Policy—challenge Of Terrorism Fashioning Interstate Equations, by Gyan Books, 2003. ISBN 81-212-0785-1
- External Affairs. Roli Books, 2003. ISBN 81-7436-264-9.
- Indian Foreign Service: History And Challenge. Konark Publishers, 2005. ISBN 81-220-0694-9.

== See also ==
- National Security Council
- Navtej Sarna
- Taranjit Singh Sandhu
- Harsh Vardhan Shringla

Diplomatic posts
Preceded by S. J. S. Chhatwal	High Commissioner of India to Sri Lanka; 1985–1989	Succeeded by L. L. Mehrotra
Preceded by Shilendra Kumar Singh	High Commissioner of India to Pakistan; 1989–1991	Succeeded by Satinder Kumar Lambah
Preceded by Muchkund Dubey	Foreign Secretary of India; 1989–1991	Succeeded by Krishnan Srinivasan
Political offices
Preceded by Brajesh Mishra	National Security Advisor; 2004–2005	Succeeded by M K Narayanan
