= List of ambassadors of India to Myanmar =

Ambassador of India to Myanmar
- Emblem of India

- Flag of India
- Incumbent; Abhay Thakur since April 2024
- Style: His Excellency
- Type: Ambassador
- Member of: Indian Foreign Service
- Reports to: Ministry of External Affairs
- Seat: Embassy of India, Yangon
- Appointer: President of India
- Term length: No fixed tenure
- Website: Indian Ambassador to Myanmar

The ambassador of India to the Myanmar is the chief diplomatic representative of India to Myanmar. The embassy is located at 545-547 Merchant St, Kyauktada Township, Yangon.

The embassy is headed by the Ambassador, while two consulates located in Mandalay and Sittwe are headed by a Consulate general. And the India Liaison Office in Nay Pyi Taw is headed by Liaison Officer.

== List of Indian ambassadors ==
The following people have served as Ambassadors to the Myanmar.

S. No.	Name	Entered office	Left office
1	M. A. Rauf	8 November 1946	1952
2	K. K. Chettur	September 1952	30 August 1954
3	R. R. Saksena	19 December 1954	1955
4	Lalji Mehrotra	17 September 1956	1958
5	R. S. Mani	4 November 1960	30 September 1963
6	R. D. Katari	1 June 1964	25 November 1969
7	Baleshwar Prasad	9 February 1970	31 January 1971
8	Ralegnao Khathing	10 January 1972	9 January 1975
9	N. P. Alexander	26 February 1975	27 March 1978
10	A. N. Bose	27 June 1978	17 July 1980
11	G. G. Swell	11 November 1980	30 July 1984
12	I. P. Singh	12 August 1985	28 August 1989
13	P. M. S. Malik	25 August 1990	24 September 1992
14	G. Parthasarathy	12 November 1992	27 May 1995
15	L. T. Pudaite	22 September 1995	21 December 1996
16	Shyam Saran	20 April 1997	4 July 2001
17	Vivek Katju	8 August 2001	12 February 2002
18	R. K. Bhatia	28 June 2002	24 August 2005
19	Bhaskar K. Mitra	1 September 2005	30 September 2008
20	Aloke Sen	6 October 2008	30 June 2010
21	V. S. Seshadri	5 July 2010	28 February 2013
22	G. Mukhopadhaya	14 June 2013	31 May 2016
23	Vikram Misri	31 August 2016	19 December 2018
24	Saurabh Kumar	30 January 2019	29 December 2021
25	Vinay Kumar	24 February 2022	12 April 2024
26	Abhay Thakur	29 April 2024	Incumbent
