= Anil Wadhwa =

Indian civil servant

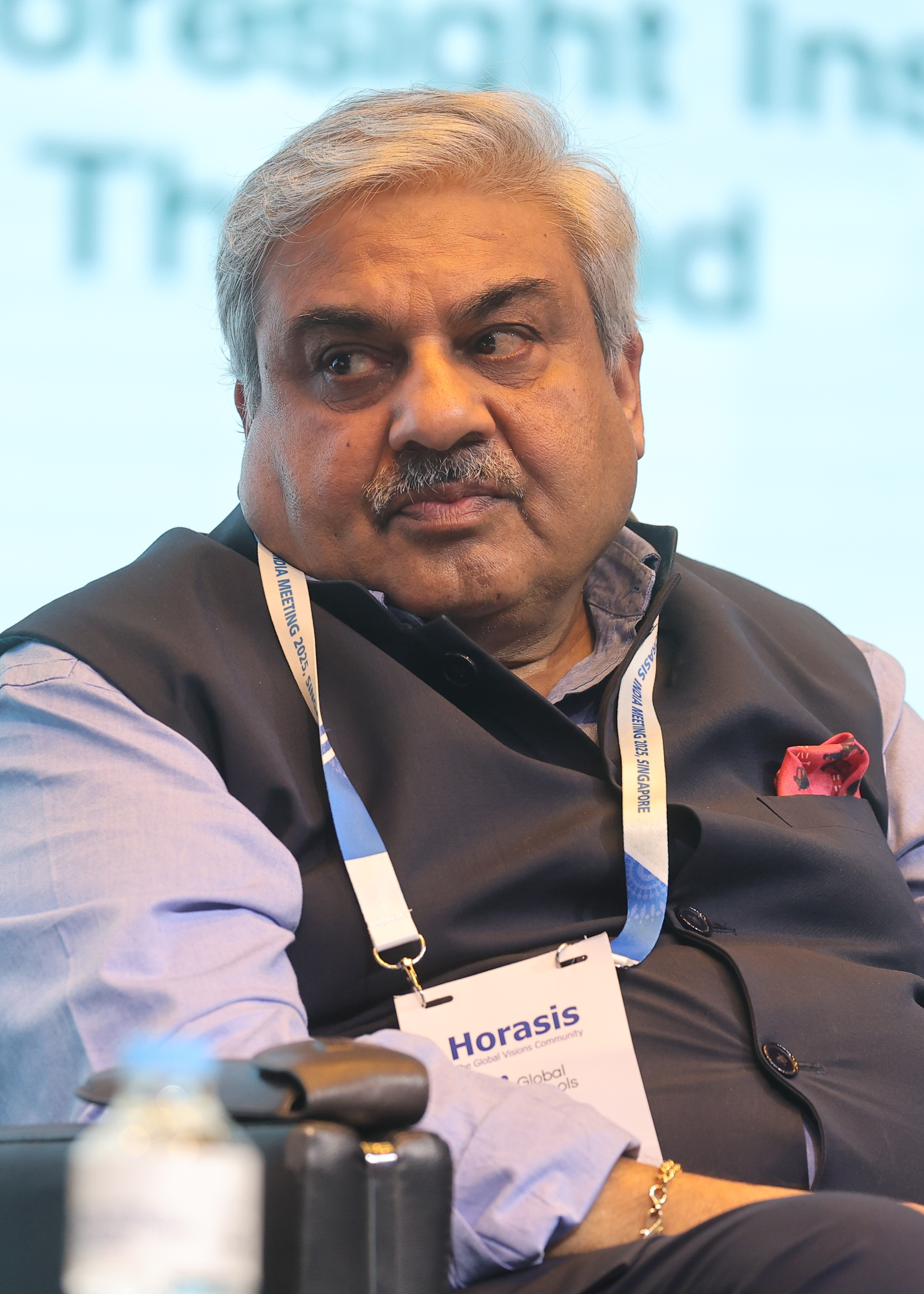
- Wadhwa in 2025

Indian Ambassador to Italy and San Marino
- In office March 2016 – May 2017
- Preceded by: Basant Kumar Gupta
- Succeeded by: Reenat Sandhu

Secretary (East), Ministry of External Affairs, India
- In office February 2014 – February 2016
- Succeeded by: Preeti Saran

Indian Ambassador to Poland and Lithuania
- In office March 2004 – August 2007
- Preceded by: R. L. Narayan
- Succeeded by: C.M. Bhandari

Indian Ambassador to Oman
- In office August 2007 – September 2011
- Preceded by: Ashok Kumar Attri
- Succeeded by: J. S. Mukul

Indian Ambassador to Thailand
- In office November 2011 – January 2014
- Preceded by: Pinak Ranjan Chakravarty
- Succeeded by: Harsh Vardhan Shringla

Personal details
- Born: 26 May 1957 (age 69)
- Spouse: Deepa Gopalan Wadhwa
- Education: St Stephen's College, Delhi; Delhi University
- Occupation: IFS
- Profession: Civil Servant

Anil Wadhwa (born 26 May 1957) is a retired Indian diplomat of Indian Foreign Service who has served as the Indian Ambassador to Italy, Poland, Oman and Thailand. He is currently a Senior Fellow and Cluster Leader at the Vivekananda International Foundation in New Delhi.

== Personal life ==
Wadhwa holds a Master of Arts with a specialisation in Chinese History as well as Medieval Indian history and Architecture from the University of Delhi. He is married to Deepa Gopalan Wadhwa, who also belongs to the Indian Foreign Service. They have two sons.

== Career ==
Anil Wadhwa was a member of the Indian Foreign Service from 1 July 1979 to 31 May 2017. He has served at the Indian missions in Hong Kong, Beijing, Geneva, Warsaw, Muscat, Bangkok and Rome.

He has served as the Director/Joint Secretary at the Technical Secretariat of the Organisation for the Prohibition of Chemical Weapons, The Hague from July 1993 to July 2000.

He was also a United Nations Disarmament Fellow at Geneva from July to November 1989. During Wadhwa's tenure as the Indian Ambassador to Italy and San Marino, he served as the Indian Permanent representative to three Rome-based agencies of the United Nations: Food and Agriculture Organization, International Fund for Agricultural Development and World Food Programme.

Wadhwa has coordinated the evacuation of Indian nationals from Iraq, Yemen and Libya while serving as the Secretary (East) in the Ministry of External Affairs, India. He was also associated with the Operation Raahat.

== See also ==
- A. Gitesh Sarma
- Harsh V Shringla
- Vijay Gokhale
