= Riva Ganguly Das =

Indian diplomat (born 1961)

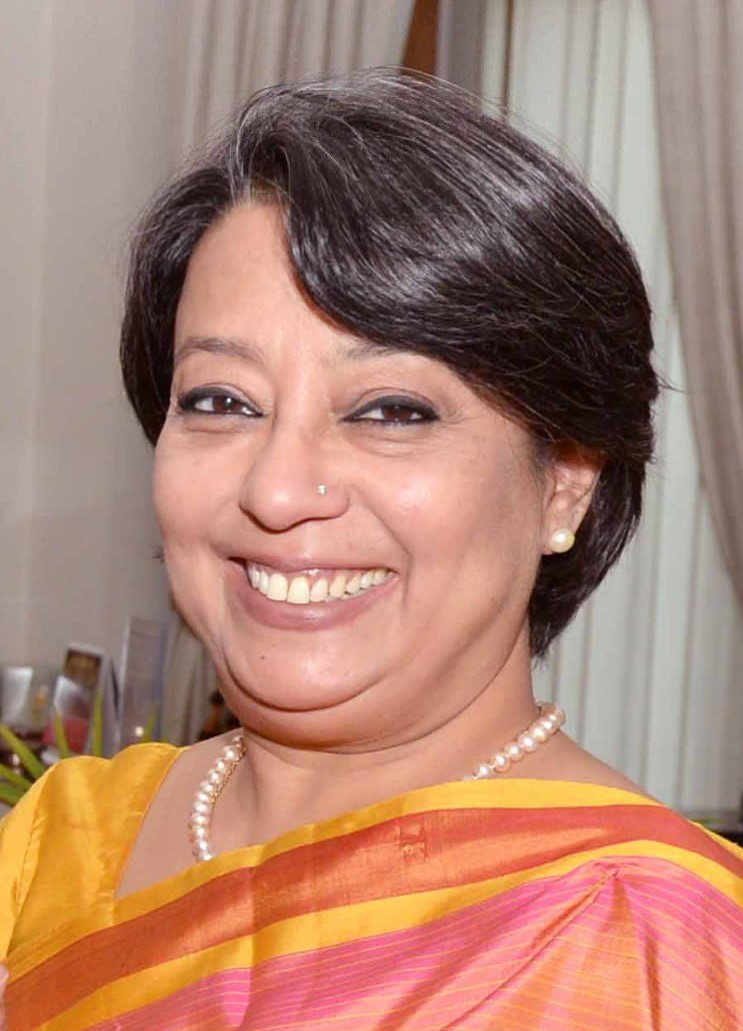

Secretary (East) Ministry of External Affairs
- In office 13 August 2020 – 31 December 2021

High Commissioner of India to Bangladesh
- In office 1 March 2019 – 12 August 2020
- Preceded by: Harsh Vardhan Shringla
- Succeeded by: Vikram Doraiswami

Director General, Indian Council for Cultural Relations
- In office 25 July 2017 – 1 March 2019
- Preceded by: Amarendra Khatua
- Succeeded by: Akhilesh Mishra

Consul General of India, New York City
- In office March 2016 – July 2017
- Preceded by: Dnyaneshwar Mulay
- Succeeded by: Sandeep Chakravorty

Indian Ambassador to Romania, Albania and Moldova
- In office March 2015 – March 2016
- Succeeded by: Dr. A V S Ramesh Chandra

Personal details
- Born: 24 December 1961 (age 64)
- Children: 2
- Education: University of Delhi
- Occupation: IFS
- Profession: civil servant

Riva Ganguly Das (born 24 December 1961) is a retired Indian civil servant who belongs to the Indian Foreign Service cadre. She is the former High Commissioner of India to Bangladesh and former director general of the Indian Council for Cultural Relations, an autonomous organisation of the Government of India.

== Personal life ==
Riva Ganguly Das spent her childhood in New Delhi. She obtained a postgraduate degree in Political Science from the University of Delhi in 1984. She later taught Political Science at the University of Delhi. She married in 1988 and has two children: a daughter and a son.

== Career ==
She joined the Indian Foreign Service in 1986. Her first posting abroad was in Spain, where she learnt Spanish at Madrid. Thereafter, she worked at the Ministry of External Affairs, Government of India in New Delhi handling External Publicity, Nepal and the Passport & Visa matters. She also headed the Cultural Wing of the Indian High Commission in Dhaka. Subsequently, she served as the Director of the United Nations Economic and Social Affairs (UNES) Division at the Ministry of External Affairs, Government of India in New Delhi. In this capacity, she was a part of negotiations relating to environmental issues, particularly climate change.

Riva Ganguly Das was the Deputy chief of mission at the Indian Embassy in The Hague and the Alternate Permanent Representative of India to the Organisation for the Prohibition of Chemical Weapons, The Hague. She also functioned as the Regional Passport Officer in Jaipur. From 2008 to 2012, she was the Consul General of India in Shanghai.

Later, she was the Head of the Public Diplomacy Division at the Ministry of External Affairs, Government of India, New Delhi. She also headed the Latin America & Caribbean Division at the Ministry of External Affairs, Government of India, New Delhi. In March 2015, Riva Ganguly Das was appointed the Indian Ambassador to Romania. In October 2015, she was concurrently accredited as the Indian Ambassador to Albania and Moldova, with residence in Bucharest (Romania). From March 2016 to July 2017, she served as the Consul General of India in New York City.

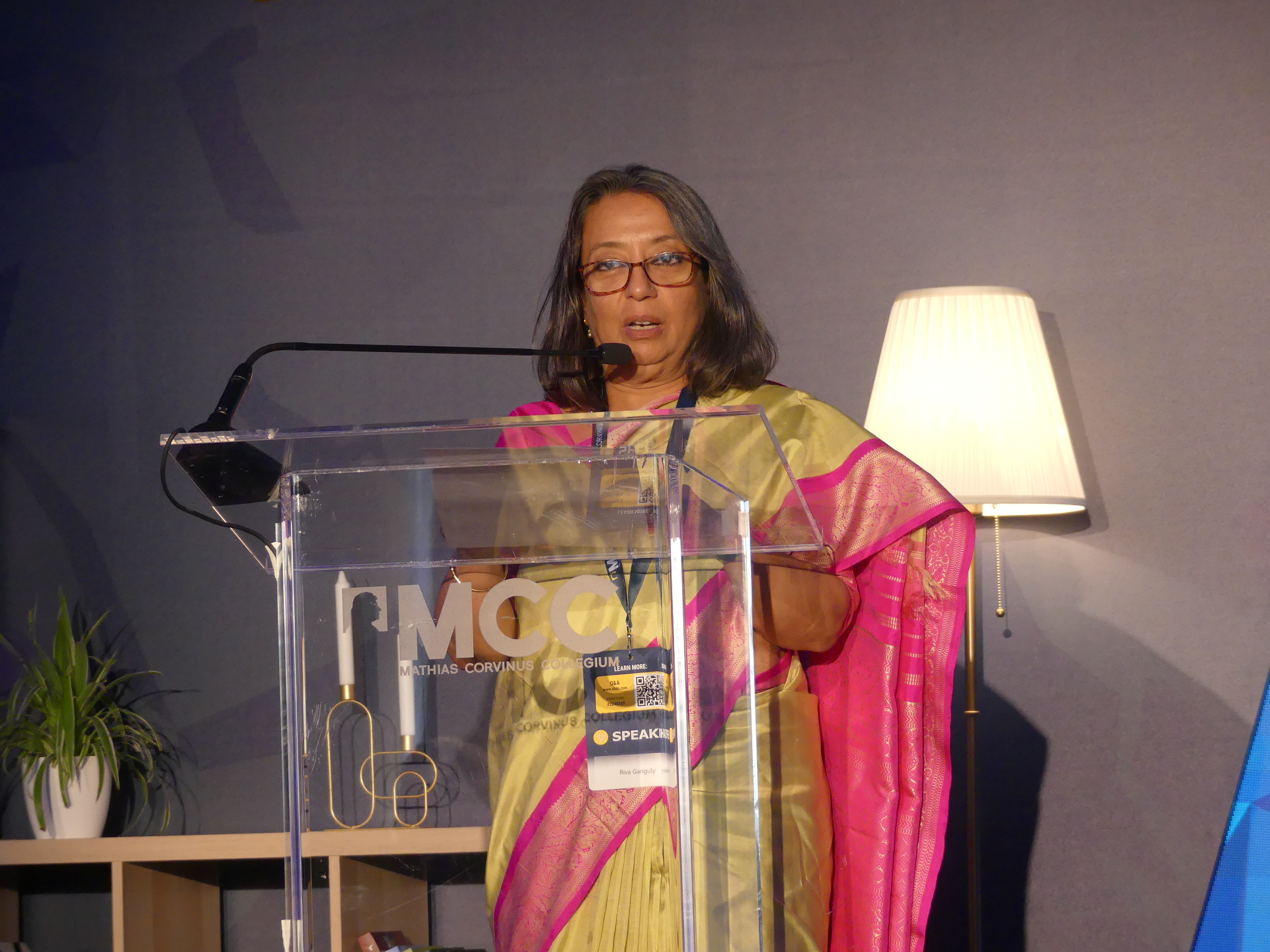
Ganguly Das speaking at the Mathias Corvinus Collegium in June 2023

In March 2019, she was appointed as the High commissioners of India to Bangladesh. In August 2020, She was appointed as the Secretary (East) of MEA and served their till December 2021.

== See also ==
- Harsh V Shringla
- Pankaj Saran
