= K. P. S. Menon =

Indian diplomat (1898 – 1982)

K. P. S. Menon CIE

1st Foreign Secretary of India
- In office 1948–1952
- Monarchs: George VI (until 26 January 1950)
- Preceded by: Sir Hugh Weightman
- Succeeded by: R. K. Nehru
- Preceded by: Sir Olaf Caroe
- Preceded by: Lt-Gen Thomas Jacomb Hutton

Personal details
- Born: Kumara Padmanabha Sivasankara Menon; 18 October 1898 Kottayam, Travancore, British India (now Kerala, India )
- Died: 22 November 1982 (aged 84) Ottapalam, Kerala, India
- Spouse: Saraswathi
- Relations: Kesava Pillai of Kandamath
- Children: K. P. S. Menon Jr.
- Occupation: Diplomat

Kumara Padmanabha Sivasankara Menon Sr. CIE ICS (18 October 1898 – 22 November 1982), usually known as K. P. S. Menon, was a diplomat and diarist, a career member of the Indian Civil Service. He was appointed independent India's first Foreign Secretary, serving from 1948 to 1952.

He was Dewan (Prime Minister) of Bharatpur State, Ambassador of India to the Soviet Union from 1952 to 1961, and Ambassador to the Republic of China before 1948. In 1948, preceding events of the Korean War, the United Nations appointed him the Chairman of the UN Commission on Korea (UNCOK). Menon was the Agent of Government Of India in Sri Lanka , 1929-32 and Agent -General of China ,1943- 47. He was also an ambassador to Hangary and Poland during the period 1952-61.

Menon's overland trip from Delhi to Chongqing (Chungking) across the Himalayas, the Karakorams and the Pamirs during the Second World War was recorded in his book Delhi-Chungking: A Travel Diary (1947). He was a signatory on behalf of India at the formation of the United Nations. He was a member of the Royal Central Asian Society.

== Early life ==
K. P. S. Menon was born in Kottayam, Travancore, British India (present-day Kerala, India) in 1898. His father Kumara Menon was a lawyer from Ottapalam. His mother Janaki Amma came from an aristocratic family near Vellayani, Travancore, niece of Kesava Pillai of Kandamath and cousin of Neyyattinkara N. K. Padmanabha Pillai. Upon her marriage to Kumara Menon, she moved to Kottayam to set up house with Kumara Menon who himself had moved away from his family in Ottapalam. The children were also given titles from their father's side . He attended Madras Christian College and then University of Oxford, where he was a contemporary of the future Prime Minister Anthony Eden and served as co-officers of the Asiatic Society. He served as the president of the Oxford Majlis Asian Society. He was admitted to the Middle Temple on 30 November 1918, but withdrew without being Called to the Bar on 15 March 1928.

== Public service career ==
In 1922, Menon secured the first rank in the combined Civil Services Examination and joined the ICS. He served as Sub-Collector of Tirupattur, Vellore District, then as District Magistrate in Trichy, Agent of the Government of India at Fort Sandeman, now Zhob, in Baluchistan, in the North West Frontier Province and Ceylon, then as Resident of India in Hyderabad State. In 1934, he was sent as Crown Representative to investigate the state of Indians in Zanzibar, Kenya and Uganda. As Dewan of Bharatpur State, he was appointed a Companion of the Order of the Indian Empire in the New Year Honours of 1943. After independence, he was India's first Foreign Secretary from 1948 to 1952, then Ambassador of India to the Soviet Union, Hungary and Poland from 1952 to 1961, being the last foreigner to see the alive Stalin in person (on 17 February 1953). On retirement, he was a member and later Chairperson of the Union Public Service Commission.

Menon married Saraswathi, the daughter of C. Sankaran Nair. His son, K. P. S. Menon Jr., served as envoy to China and his grandson Shivshankar Menon was Ambassador to China, Foreign Secretary and later the National Security Advisor.

Menon was awarded the Padma Bhushan in 1958 and the Lenin Peace Prize.

== Works ==
Menon's published writings include:

- Many Worlds: An Autobiography
- Many Worlds Revisited - updated autobiography
- Delhi-Chungking: A Travel Diary (1947)
- Russian Panorama
- The Friendship of Great Peoples (1962)
- The Flying Troika (1963)
- The Resurgence of India: Reformation Or Revolution? Sardar Vallabhbhai Patel Memorial Lectures (1963)
- India & the Cold War (1966)
- Journey Round the World (1966)
- Biography of Sir Chettur Sankaran Nair
- Lenin through Indian Eyes (1970)
- Russia Revisited (1971)
- The Lamp and the Lampstand
- Twilight in China (1972)
- The Indo-Soviet Treaty: Setting & Sequel (1972)
- A Diplomat Speaks (1974)
- Yesterday and Today (1975) - a collection of articles, illustrated by Abu Abraham
- Changing Patterns of Diplomacy- Dr. Saiyidain Memorial Lectures (1977)
- Memories and Musings (1979)
- One Thousand Full Moons (Published posthumously in 1987)

Diplomatic posts
New title	Foreign Secretary of India; 1948 - 1952	Succeeded by Ratan Kumar Nehru
Preceded by Sarvepalli Radhakrishnan	Ambassador of India to the Soviet Union; 1952 - 1961	Succeeded by Subimal Dutt
