= High Commission of India, Dhaka =

Diplomatic mission of the India to Bangladesh

High Commission of India in Dhaka
- Address: Plot No: 1-3, Park Road, Baridhara, Dhaka 1212
- Opened: 1972
- Jurisdiction: Bangladesh
- High Commissioner: Dinesh Trivedi
- Website: Embassy of India, Dhaka

The High Commission of India in Dhaka is the diplomatic mission of the Republic of India to Bangladesh. It is headed by the High Commissioner of India to Bangladesh. The current High Commissioner is Dinesh Trivedi.

== History ==
India formally recognized Bangladesh as an independent state on 6 December 1971, becoming one of the first countries to establish diplomatic relations with the newly independent country. The High Commission of India in Dhaka was established in 1972 and has since served as India's principal diplomatic mission in Bangladesh.

Since its establishment, the mission has played a central role in managing India–Bangladesh relations, including cooperation in trade, connectivity, border management, water-sharing, energy, defense, and development partnership.

In June 2015, Prime Minister Narendra Modi virtually inaugurated the newly built chancery complex during his state visit to Bangladesh. The chancery complex was formally inaugurated by External Affairs Minister Sushma Swaraj on 23 October 2017.

== Premises ==
The High Commission is located at Plot No. 1–3, Park Road, in the Baridhara Diplomatic Enclave of Dhaka. The mission houses the chancery, consular, economic, political, cultural, and development partnership wings.

== Functions ==
The High Commission represents the Government of India in Bangladesh and is responsible for diplomatic engagement, consular services, visa processing, protection of Indian nationals, and promotion of bilateral trade, investment, and cultural ties.

The mission also coordinates India's development assistance to Bangladesh, including grant projects, Lines of Credit, scholarships, and technical cooperation programmes.

== Assistant High Commissions ==
In addition to its mission in Dhaka, India maintains four Assistant High Commissions in Bangladesh, located in Chattogram, Khulna, Rajshahi, and Sylhet.

These missions extend consular outreach and facilitate regional diplomatic engagement in their respective jurisdictions.

=== Locations ===
- Chattogram – Assistant High Commission of India
- Khulna – Assistant High Commission of India
- Rajshahi – Assistant High Commission of India
- Sylhet – Assistant High Commission of India

== Cultural diplomacy ==
The High Commission promotes cultural relations between India and Bangladesh through the Indira Gandhi Cultural Centre, Dhaka, which functions under the Indian Council for Cultural Relations (ICCR).

ICCR has been active in Bangladesh since 2010. A new Indian Cultural Centre building at the High Commission premises was inaugurated by External Affairs Minister S. Jaishankar on 4 March 2021.

The centre organises events related to Indian classical music, dance, yoga, Hindi language instruction, film screenings, and academic exchanges.

== List of High Commissioners ==
The High Commissioner of India to Bangladesh is the head of the mission. The inaugural High Commissioner was Subimal Dutt, while the incumbent is Pranay Kumar Verma, who assumed office in July 2022. He is decided to be succeeded by Dinesh Trivedi.

In April 2026, Dinesh Trivedi was appointed as the High Commissioner to Bangladesh, succeeding Ambassador Pranay Kumar Verma. His appointment to Dhaka came at a time when both India and Bangladesh are looking at repairing the bilateral ties that came under strain during the tenure of interim government of Muhammad Yunus. He was appointed as India's envoy, breaking a decades-long tradition of appointing career diplomats in this role, due to his deep roots in West Bengal and familiarity with cross-border issues, which are viewed as key assets for stabilizing relations during a delicate political period in Dhaka.

== Anti India movement ==
Following the resignation of former prime minister Sheikh Hasina the anti India protest grew rapidly in Bangladesh. Sheikh Hasina was fled to India right after the resignation. She was accused for mass killing during July Uprising. According to Prisoner exchange agreement with India and Bangladesh, Bangladesh Government formally asked to handover her. Despite the government effort of Bangladesh, the Indian government did not gave any reply. Within the timeframe, sentiments against India and Indian's aggression in Bangladeshi internal affairs grew rapidly which caused to various Bangladeshi political group launch an attacking Indian diplomatic mission in Bangladesh.

== See also ==
- Bangladesh–India relations
- List of diplomatic missions in Bangladesh
- High Commission of Bangladesh, New Delhi
