= Balodyan =

Balodyan is a residential hostel project for nomadic and orphan children. This initiative was started in Jun 2009 in Lat village in Kolhapur District, Maharashtra, India. Currently it houses 31 children and it plans to expand for 100 children.

This project is governed by Vidyarthi Vikas Prabodhini, a registered organization (Reg.No.MH/25713/KOP) working for improvement in rural education system in Kolhapur district of Maharashtra, India since last 5 years. Organization provides basic needs like computers, benches, library, laboratory and sports equipment, audio-visual devices and educational adoption program for economically challenged students in rural schools.

Ambassador Dnyaneshwar Mulay, Diplomat, Author, Columnist is the source of inspiration, guidance for project Balodyan.
