= Kanishka Singh =

Indian politician

Political aide to Rahul Gandhi

Personal details
- Born: 1978 (age 47–48) New Delhi
- Party: Indian National Congress

Kanishka Singh (born 1978) is an Indian politician. He is a political aide to the Congress MP and former President, Rahul Gandhi.

== Early life ==
He was born to S. K. Singh, an IFS officer, former foreign secretary and ex-governor of Rajasthan and Manju. He is a computer engineer and went to St. Stephen's College, Delhi. He did his MBA from Wharton. His elder brother Shashank Singh, is a Harvard MBA and works in Mumbai.

== Career ==
Kanishka Singh started his career as an investment banker on Wall Street working with merchant banking firm Lazard Freres & Co in New York, before he decided to join up with Rahul Gandhi. He also worked with the World Bank.

== Political career ==
He entered politics in 2003 being part of the team that was behind Delhi chief minister Sheila Dikshit's electoral campaign.

After writing an article for Outlook magazine, proved to be a turning point in his career. He has been a constant companion of Rahul Gandhi, ever since he won the Amethi seat in 2004. Among his contributions, a customised Request Management System software for speedy processing of appeals and grievances from Amethi. For Sonia Gandhi's election, He was in charge of door-to-door campaigning in the Saraini Assembly segment. With his vital role alongside Rahul Gandhi, Kanishka Singh has also been named in the list of the most powerful Indians in 2012 where he has been ranked at no. 31.
