= K. K. Chettur =

Indian civil servant and diplomat (1901–1956)

Krishna Krishna Chettur

1st Ambassador of India to Japan
- In office 7 May 1952 – August 1952
- Prime Minister: Jawaharlal Nehru
- Preceded by: Himself (Note: As Head of the Indian Liaison Mission in Tokyo and Political Representative of India with the Supreme Commander Allied Powers in Japan.)
- Succeeded by: M. A. Rauf

Head of the Indian Liaison Mission in Tokyo and Political Representative of India with the Supreme Commander Allied Powers in Japan
- In office 8 March 1950 – 28 April 1952
- Prime Minister: Jawaharlal Nehru
- Preceded by: Birendra Narayan Chakraborty
- Succeeded by: Himself (Note: Following the enforcement of the Treaty of San Francisco on 28 April 1952 and end to the Allied occupation of Japan, this post was succeeded as the title of ambassador coinciding with the formal establishment of diplomatic relations between India and Japan. K. K. Chettur continued as head of the mission.)

2nd Ambassador of India to Burma
- In office September 1952 – 30 August 1954
- Prime Minister: Jawaharlal Nehru
- Preceded by: Muhammad Abdul Rauf
- Succeeded by: Radhey Raman Saksena

Ambassador of India to Belgium and Luxembourg
- In office 30 August 1954 – 29 April 1956
- Prime Minister: Jawaharlal Nehru
- Preceded by: P. A. Menon
- Succeeded by: B. N. Kaul

Personal details
- Born: 10 March 1901
- Died: 29 April 1956 (aged 55) Brussels, Belgium
- Relatives: C. Sankaran Nair (uncle)

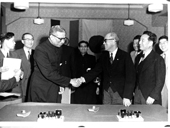
K.K. Chettur, Indian Ambassador to Japan shaking hands with Katsuo Okazaki, Japanese Foreign Minister, after signing the Indo-Japanese Treaty of Peace in Tokyo

Krishna Krishna Chettur ICS (10 March 1901 – 29 April 1956) was an Indian civil servant and diplomat who served as India's first ambassador to Japan.

== Career ==
After university, during which he took an MA, Chettur entered the Indian Civil Service on 5 March 1925, serving in the Indian Audit Department. From October 1930 to April 1933, he was posted as a currency officer in Rangoon (now Yangon), the capital of British Burma (now Myanmar) and then a province of British India. From 1933 until May 1937, he served in the same role in Calcutta (now Kolkata) before being posted to the Finance Department of the Government of India as an under-secretary. He was promoted to deputy secretary (ex-officio) in April 1940 and to deputy secretary in the Commerce Department in August 1944. Following India's independence in August 1947, he rose to the officiating rank of a Secretary in the Commerce Department.

From 8 March 1950, Chettur was posted to Tokyo as the Head of the Indian Liaison Mission and Political Representative of India with the Supreme Commander Allied Powers (SCAP), in which capacity he held the personal rank of a Minister. He was promoted to the rank of Ambassador on 24 November 1951. On 28 April 1952, following India's official peace treaty with Japan, he was appointed India's first Ambassador to Japan, with effect from 7 May 1952, and served in that role until 25 July 1952, when he was appointed Ambassador to Burma. In September 1954, he was appointed as Ambassador to Belgium, formally retiring from government service on his 55th birthday, but continuing to serve as Ambassador to Belgium. Just over a month later, while playing golf, he succumbed to a sudden heart attack in Brussels on 29 April 1956.

== Personal life ==
Chettur was born into a distinguished political family. His uncle was Sir C. Sankaran Nair, a judge of the Madras High Court and the President of the Indian National Congress in 1897, who subsequently served as Advocate-General of the Madras Presidency from 1906 to 1908. Among his cousins was the Indian Army general Kunhiraman Palat Candeth.

Chettur's daughter Jaya Jaitly is a noted socialist politician and activist who founded the Samata Party; his granddaughter Aditi is married to cricketer Ajay Jadeja.
