= Shilendra Kumar Singh =

Indian diplomat (1932–2009)

S. K. Singh
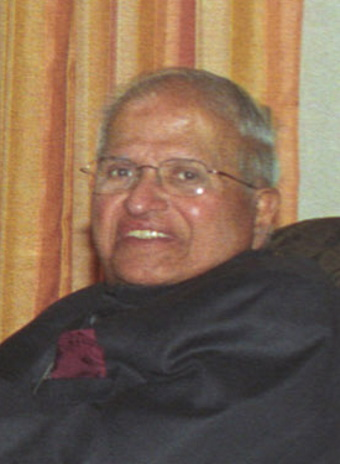
- S. Singh

17th Governor of Rajasthan
- In office 6 September 2007 – 1 December 2009
- Chief Minister: Vasundhara Raje; Ashok Gehlot
- Preceded by: Akhlaqur Rahman Kidwai
- Succeeded by: Prabha Rau

12th Governor of Arunachal Pradesh
- In office 15 April 2007 – 3 September 2007
- Chief Minister: Dorjee Khandu
- Preceded by: K. Sankaranarayanan (Acting)
- Succeeded by: K. Sankaranarayanan (Acting)
- In office 16 December 2004 – 23 January 2007
- Chief Minister: Gegong Apang
- Preceded by: V. C. Pande
- Succeeded by: M. M. Jacob (Acting)

16th Foreign Secretary of India
- In office 16 February 1989 – 19 April 1990
- Prime Minister: Rajiv Gandhi; Vishwanath Pratap Singh
- Minister: P. V. Narasimha Rao; Vishwanath Pratap Singh; Inder Kumar Gujral
- Preceded by: K. P. S. Menon Jr.
- Succeeded by: Muchkund Dubey

Personal details
- Born: Shilendra Kumar Singh; 24 January 1932
- Died: 1 December 2009 (aged 77) Delhi, India
- Spouse: Manju Singh
- Children: Shashank, Kanishka

Shilendra Kumar Singh or S.K. Singh (24 January 1932 – 1 December 2009) was an Indian diplomat. He was Governor of Arunachal Pradesh from December 2004 to September 2007 and Governor of Rajasthan from September 2007 until he died in office in December 2009.

Singh was Indian Foreign Secretary from 1989 to 1990. Prior to becoming Governor of Arunachal Pradesh, he was secretary-general of a think tank in Delhi, the University of Pennsylvania Institute for the Advanced Study of India. He was appointed Governor of Rajasthan on 19 August 2007, left his position as Governor of Arunachal Pradesh on 4 September 2007, and was sworn in as Governor of Rajasthan on 6 September.

== Early life and education ==
He was the son of a nationalist zamindar of the erstwhile United Provinces, and a former Dewan of Alwar. A topper throughout school and college, he was an alumnus of St John's College, Agra which is affiliated to Agra University where he received a bachelor's degree in history, Sanskrit and Hindi. He attended the Agra University and received a master's degree in history and an LLB Degree. Thereafter he read Persian and International Law at Trinity College, Cambridge.

He was married to Manju Singh. His younger son Kanishka Singh is a political aide to Rahul Gandhi and his elder son, Shashank Singh, has an MBA from Harvard University, and currently works as an investment banker in Mumbai.

== Career ==
=== Gubernatorial tenure ===
While in Arunachal Pradesh, Singh was an extremely vocal advocate articulating that Arunachal Pradesh is a non-negotiable part of sovereign India. He also crusaded for the Inner Line Permit and restricted area permit required for travel to Arunachal Pradesh to be abolished. In addition, he worked hard for ensuring connectivity of Arunachal Pradesh with the rest of India by building an airport in the state, constructing a railway line and improving the road network.

=== Career as a diplomat ===
In February 1989, Singh was appointed Foreign Secretary of India. He held the personal rank of Grade-I Ambassador, the highest in the Indian Foreign Service. Prior to becoming Foreign Secretary, he was India's longest serving Ambassador to Pakistan from 1985 until 1989. He also served as Ambassador to Austria from 1982 to 1985, Additional Foreign Secretary from 1979 to 1982, Ambassador to Afghanistan from 1977 to 1979 and Ambassador concurrently to Jordan, Lebanon and Cyprus from 1974 to 1977. He was the longest-serving Official Spokesman of the Government of India from 1969 to 1974. In 1968–69 he served in the Ministry of Commerce as Director Foreign Trade.

Singh began his career in the Indian Foreign Service in 1954. From 1956 to 1959, he was Third Secretary in Iran and concurrently attended the Tehran University to study the Persian language. From 1959 to 1962 he was assigned to various desks in the Foreign Office in Delhi. From 1962 to 1968 he was a member of the Permanent Mission of India to the United Nations in New York.

Singh was President of the Group of 77 and also served as India's Governor on the Board of Governors of the International Atomic Energy Agency in Vienna. Singh has been a member of 19 Indian delegations to the UN General Assembly and the United Nations Commission on Human Rights. Singh has monitored for the Commonwealth and the United Nations, general elections in South Africa, Kenya, Algeria, Lesotho, Malawi and Sierra Leone and the presidential election in Sri Lanka. Singh is rated among the most distinguished in his generation of Indian diplomats.

Singh has taught history at Agra University. He was a Visiting Professor and Member of the Academic Council of Jawaharlal Nehru University, Delhi.

=== Commentator ===
Singh was a frequent writer and commentator on international relations, geopolitics and current developments.

== Death ==
He died at Sir Ganga Ram Hospital in Delhi on 1 December 2009, aged 77, after a brief illness.

Diplomatic posts
Preceded by K. D. Sharma	High Commissioner of India to Pakistan; 1985-1989	Succeeded by J. N. Dixit
Preceded by K. P. S. Menon Jr.	Foreign Secretary of India; 1989-1990	Succeeded by Muchukund Dubey
Government offices
Preceded by V. C. Pande	Governor of Arunachal Pradesh; 2004–2007	Succeeded by K. Sankaranarayanan
