= Harsh Vardhan Shringla =

Indian diplomat (born 1962)

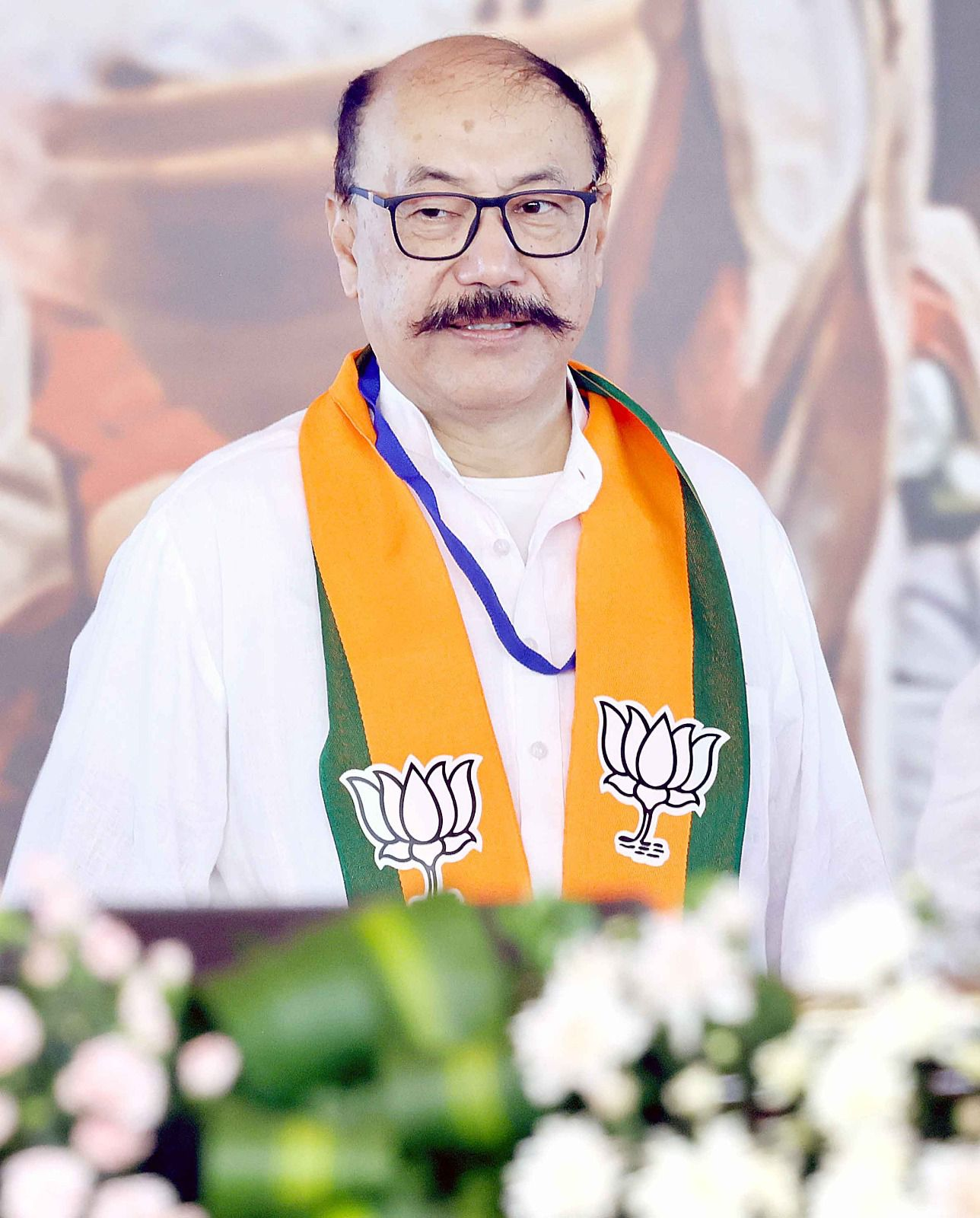
- MP (Rajya Sabha)

Member of Parliament, Rajya Sabha
- Incumbent
- Assumed office 21 July 2025
- Nominated by: Droupadi Murmu
- Preceded by: Sonal Mansingh
- Constituency: Nominated (Diplomacy)

33rd Foreign Secretary of India
- In office 29 January 2020 – 30 April 2022
- Prime Minister: Narendra Modi
- Minister: S. Jaishankar
- Preceded by: Vijay Keshav Gokhale
- Succeeded by: Vinay Mohan Kwatra

Ambassador of India to the United States
- In office 9 January 2019 – 11 January 2020
- Preceded by: Navtej Sarna
- Succeeded by: Taranjit Singh Sandhu

High Commissioner of India to Bangladesh
- In office January 2016 – January 2019
- Preceded by: Pankaj Saran
- Succeeded by: Riva Ganguly Das

Ambassador of India to Thailand
- In office January 2014 – January 2016
- Preceded by: Anil Wadhwa
- Succeeded by: Bhagwant Singh Bishnoi

Personal details
- Born: Harsh Vardhan Shringla; 1 May 1962 (age 64) Bombay, Maharashtra, India
- Children: Ashok Vardhan Shringla
- Relatives: Chokila Iyer (aunt)
- Education: Mayo College (HSC); St. Stephen's College (BA); Delhi University
- Profession: Politician

Harsh Vardhan Shringla is a retired Indian Foreign Service officer and currently serving as the Member of the Rajya Sabha, having been nominated by the President of India since 2025. He was the Chief Coordinator for India's G20 Presidency in 2023, has served as Foreign Secretary of India from 2020 to 2022, India's Ambassador to the United States, the High Commissioner to Bangladesh and the Ambassador to Thailand.

== Educational background ==
Born in Bombay, Shringla was schooled at Mayo College, Ajmer and received a B.A. from St. Stephen's College, Delhi. He worked in private industry in India prior to joining the Indian Foreign Service (IFS) in 1984. He has published papers on conflict prevention, economic diplomacy, the Indian diaspora, and India-Bangladesh relations.

== Diplomatic career ==
Shringla spent 38 years in the Indian Foreign Service and held a variety of positions both in New Delhi, at the headquarters of the MEA, and abroad at Indian diplomatic missions. He was posted in France (as part of India's Mission to UNESCO), the Permanent Mission of India to the United Nations in New York City, Vietnam (at the consulate-general and embassy in Hanoi and Ho Chi Minh City, respectively), Israel, and South Africa (at the consulate-general in Durban).

=== Ambassador of India to Thailand ===
Shringla received his first ambassadorial assignment to the Kingdom of Thailand and served for two years from January 2014 to January 2016.

=== High Commissioner of India to Bangladesh ===
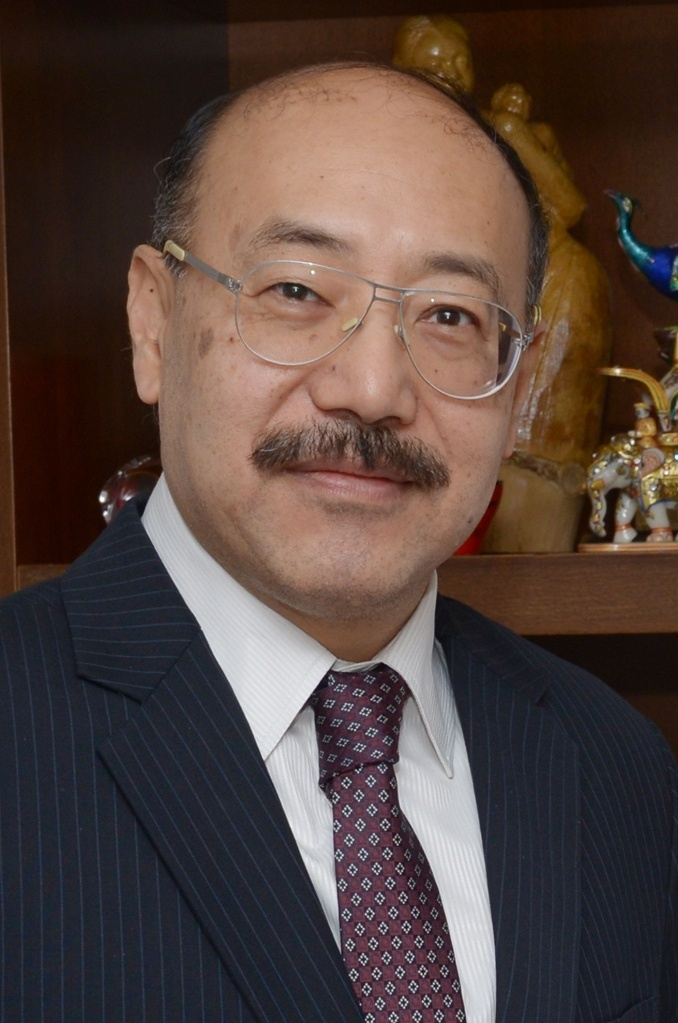
Shringla as the Indian High Commissioner to Bangladesh in Dhaka in 2016.

Shringla served as High Commissioner of India to Bangladesh from January 2016 to January 2019. During this period, Prime Minister Sheikh Hasina of Bangladesh visited India in April 2017, a visit that Shringla helped coordinate. Prime Minister Narendra Modi described her visit as the heralding of a "Sonali Adhyay" or a "Golden Era" in the bilateral ties. He is also credited for his role as the co-chair of the India-Bangladesh Joint Boundary Working Group, which finalized India's Land Boundary Agreement with Bangladesh.

=== Ambassador of India to the United States ===
In 2019, Shringla was appointed the Indian Ambassador to the United States. Within two days of his arrival in Washington, D.C., he presented his credentials to U.S. President Donald Trump on 11 January 2019 in a ceremony at The White House.

He traveled to 21 U.S. states during his one-year tenure, making an effort to reach out to students, Americans of Indian-origin, working professionals, and state governments.

During his time in the U.S., the Howdy Modi event took place in Houston, Texas on 22 September 2019, where Prime Minister Narendra Modi and U.S. President Donald Trump jointly addressed a gathering of over 50,000 people, with a plurality of the attendees being of Indian-origin. The event was the largest rally ever hosted by a foreign leader in the United States, and the first one to be jointly held with a U.S. president. Shringla, as India's Ambassador, was heavily involved in the planning of the event.

== Foreign Secretary of India ==
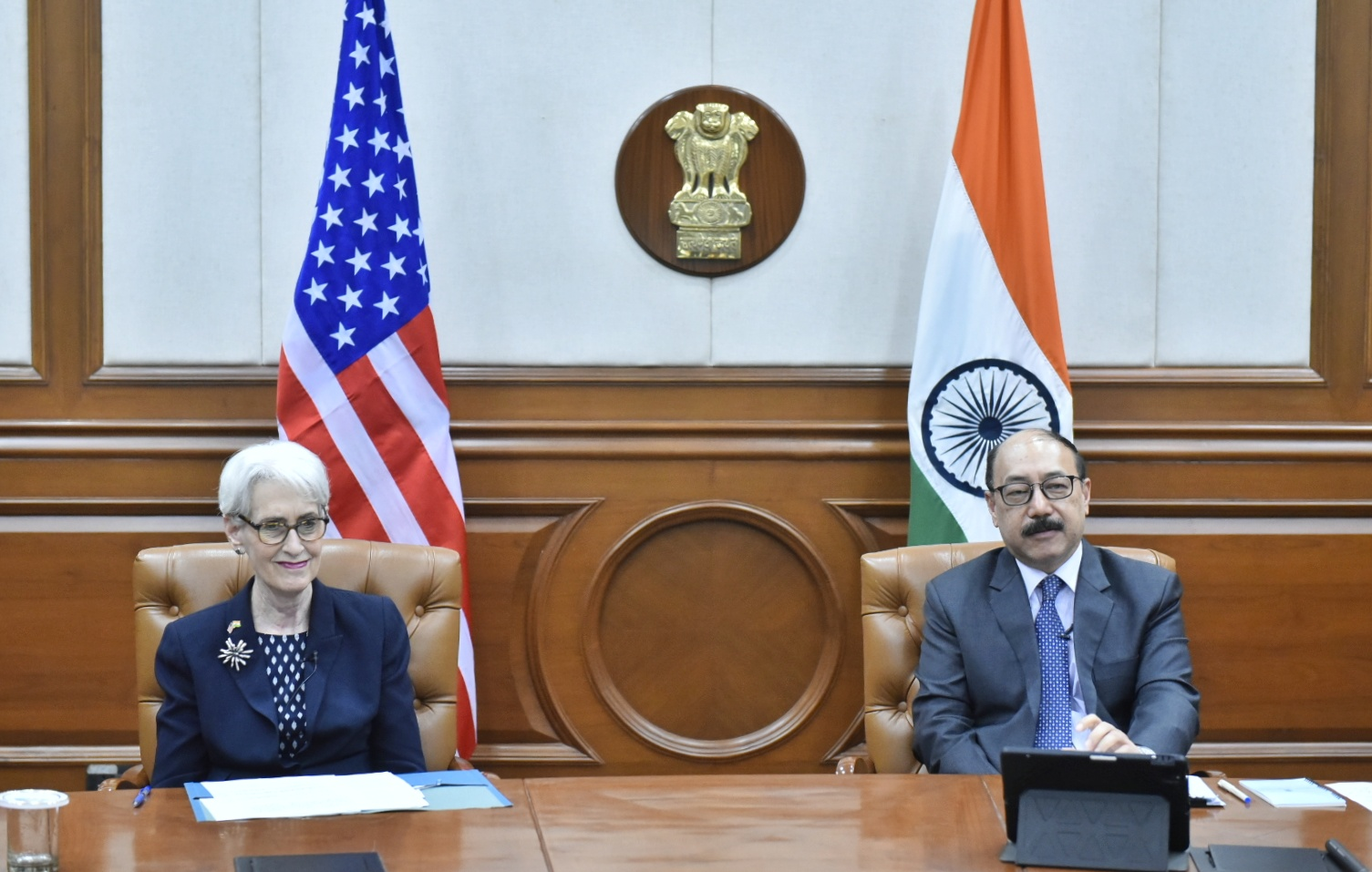
Deputy Secretary Sherman Participates in the India Ideas Summit with Foreign Secretary Shringla

On 29 January 2020, Shringla assumed the charge of Foreign Secretary of India as the 33rd Foreign Secretary. While addressing media ahead of taking charge, Shringla acknowledged the responsibilities and challenges that came with it and added that he would work under the leadership of Prime Minister and Foreign Affairs Minister of India for a more secure and prosperous India.

As Foreign Secretary of India, he visited Myanmar in December 2021 and emphasised India's interest in seeing Myanmar's return to democracy at the earliest; release of detainees and prisoners; resolution of issues through dialogue and complete cessation of all violence in relation to the 2021 Myanmar coup d'état.

During his tenure as Foreign Secretary, he dealt with some of the most pressing foreign policy issues namely, fallout of the COVID pandemic, India-China border issues at Ladakh, U.S. withdrawal from Afghanistan and military takeover in Myanmar.

On 1 April 2022 he was succeeded by Vinay Mohan Kwatra as the 34th Foreign Secretary of India. After his superannuation from the Indian Foreign Service, Shringla was appointed Chief G20 Coordinator for India's G20 Presidency in 2023.

== Publications ==
Shringla has written on a number of topics such as international economy, climate change, preventive diplomacy and India-US bilateral relations, including The United Nations and Conflict Prevention: Balance Between Sovereignty and Action (Indian Journal of International Law) and Project Granite at the New International Airport in Israel (CUTS International, 2011).

Shringla has also contributed articles in newspapers and magazines on a diverse range of topics including an Op-ed piece in The New York Times, India Is Building a More Prosperous Kashmir giving the context and objectives of India's decision to abrogate the temporary Article 370 in Jammu and Kashmir.

== Personal life ==
Shringla was born to Tshering Tenduf La, a Sikkimese father and Hari Devi Basnet, a Hindu Gorkha mother. Both his parents were from Darjeeling, West Bengal. His father was also part of the Indian civil service. He speaks Nepali, English, French, Vietnamese, Hebrew and other Indian languages like Bengali, Hindi and Sikkimese. He has one son, Ashok Vardhan Shringla.

== Awards and honors ==
- He was awarded the JTM Gibson Award for Outstanding Alumni by Mayo College, Ajmer in 2017.
- The ICFAI University, Sikkim bestowed on him a D. Litt Honoris Causa Honorary Doctorate degree on 9 September 2019.

== See also ==
- Vijay Gokhale
- List of Mayoites
- Dr. S Jaishankar

Diplomatic posts
Preceded by Anil Wadhwa	Indian Ambassador to Thailand; 2014–2016	Succeeded by Bhagwant Singh Bishnoi
Preceded by Pankaj Saran	Indian High Commissioner to Bangladesh; 2016–2019	Succeeded by Riva Ganguly Das
Preceded by Navtej Sarna	Indian Ambassador to the United States; 2019–2020	Succeeded by Taranjit Singh Sandhu
Preceded by Vijay Gokhale	Foreign Secretary of India; 2020–2022	Succeeded by Vinay Mohan Kwatra
