= Satish Chandra (diplomat) =

Indian diplomat

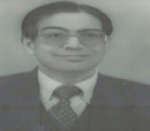

14th Indian Ambassador to Pakistan
- In office August 1995 – December 1998
- Prime Minister: P. V. Narasimha Rao
- Succeeded by: G. Parthasarathy

Former Deputy NSA

Personal details
- Occupation: Diplomat

Satish Chandra is a 1965 batch retired Indian Foreign Service officer. He is currently the Vice chairperson of the New Delhi-based think tank Vivekananda International Foundation.

Chandra has served as India's Permanent representative to United Nations Office at Geneva. His prior assignments include chairperson, Joint Intelligence Committee. He has served as the Deputy NSA under NSA Brajesh Mishra, and as a diplomat to Indian missions in Pakistan, Bangladesh, and the United States of America.

During Chandra's tenure as Indian High Commissioner to Pakistan, India conducted the Pokhran-II nuclear tests in May 1998; Pakistan conducted the Chagai-I and Chagai-II tests later the same month.

== See also ==
- Arvind Gupta
- Ajit Doval
- Vivekananda International Foundation
