= Ratan Kumar Nehru =

Indian civil servant and diplomat (1902–1981)

R. K. Nehru
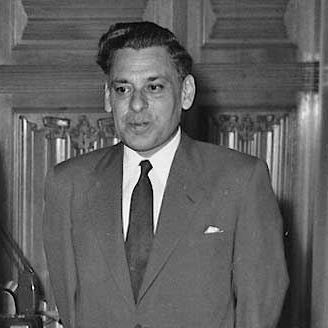
- Nehru in 1959

Minister (Legation) of India to Sweden
- In office January 1949 – September 1951
- Preceded by: Office established
- Succeeded by: M. J. Desai

Foreign Secretary
- In office 1952–1955
- Preceded by: K. P. S. Menon
- Succeeded by: Subimal Dutt

Ambassador of India to China
- In office 1955–1958
- Preceded by: Nedyam Raghavan
- Succeeded by: G. Parthasarathy

Ambassador of India to United Arab Republic
- In office 1958–1960

Secretary-General of the Ministry of External Affairs
- In office 1960–1963
- Preceded by: N. R. Pillai
- Succeeded by: Position abolished

Personal details
- Born: 10 October 1902
- Died: 2 April 1981 (aged 78)
- Spouse: Rajan Nehru
- Children: Dr. Ajay Nehru and Vivek Nehru

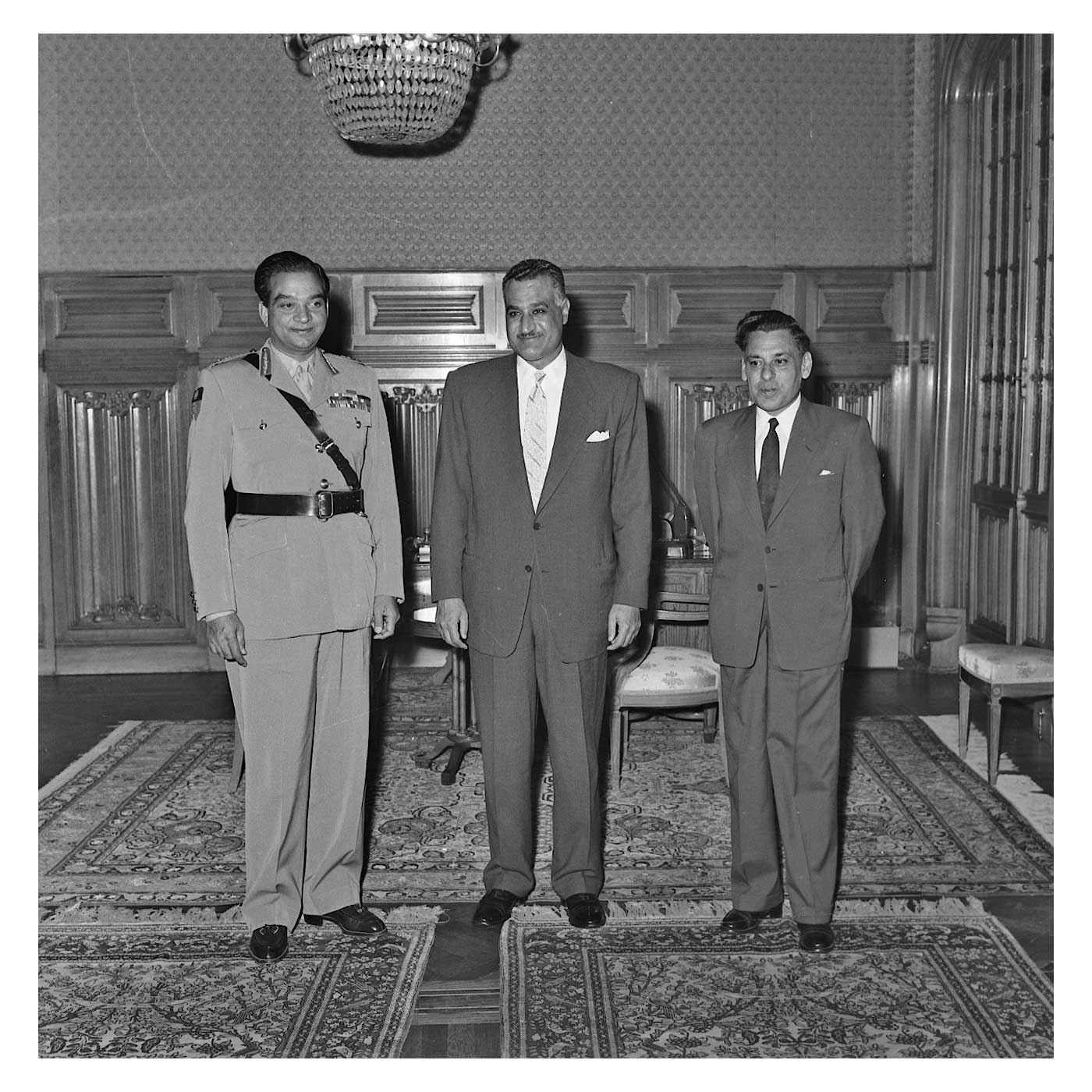
R. K. Nehru (right) with Egyptian leader Gamal Abdel Nasser (center) and Rajpramukh Man Singh II of Rajasthan (left)

Ratan Kumar Nehru, or R.K. Nehru, (10 October 1902 – 2 April 1981) was an Indian civil servant and diplomat. He served as the Foreign Secretary, 1952–1955, and later as India's ambassador to China and United Arab Republic (Egypt). During 1960–1963, he was appointed the Secretary-General of the Ministry of External Affairs, a period in which India faced an invasion from China. He retired in 1963, after which the position of Secretary-General was abolished, and the Foreign Secretary role became the head of the Ministry.

He was son of Mohanlal Nehru, grandson of Nandlal Nehru, older brother of Motilal Nehru. Ratan was married to Rajan Nehru (1909–1994), the daughter of Sir Kailas Narain Haskar (1878–1953), a prominent figure from Gwalior State. Couple had two sons, Dr. Ajay Nehru, a distinguished nuclear scientist, and Air Commodore Vivek Nehru, Air Attaché to several countries. .

== Bibliography ==
- Benner, Jeffrey (2019). The Indian Foreign Policy Bureaucracy. Routledge. ISBN 978-1-00-030241-7.

Diplomatic posts
Preceded by K. P. S. Menon	Foreign Secretary of India; 1952 - 1955	Succeeded by Subimal Dutt
