= Rajeet Mitter =

Indian diplomat and former High Commissioner of India to Bangladesh

His Excellency Rajeet Mitter IFS

High Commissioner of India to Botswana
- In office September 1998 – June 2001
- Preceded by: Cherry George
- Succeeded by: L. T. Munna

High Commissioner of India to Bangladesh
- In office December 2009 – October 2011
- Preceded by: Pinak Ranjan Chakravarty
- Succeeded by: Pankaj Saran

Personal details
- Occupation: Indian Foreign Service

Pinak Ranjan Chakravarty is a retired Indian diplomat and former High Commissioner of India to Bangladesh.

== Career ==
Mitter served as the High Commissioner of India to Botswana from September 1998 to June 2001.

In October 2009, Mitter was appointed the High Commissioner of India to Bangladesh. He had been serving as the ambassador of India to the Philippines. He succeeded Pinak Ranjan Chakravarty as High Commissioner. He worked with the government of Bangladesh to resolve the India–Bangladesh enclaves issue. He signed the treaty to exchange the enclaves on behalf of the government of India while Bangladesh was represented by Tariq Ahmad Karim.

Mitter pushed for low transit fees from Bangladesh and warned the government charging high fees would be detrimental to the interests of Bangladesh.

Mitter met former Prime Minister Khaleda Zia before returning to India in October 2011. He led an Indian research team looking at a proposed corridor between Bangladesh, China, India, and Myanmar.

Mitter is a member of the Association of Indian Diplomats. He has proposed the creation of Bangladesh, China, India, Myanmar Film Festival.
