= Indrajit Singh Chadha =

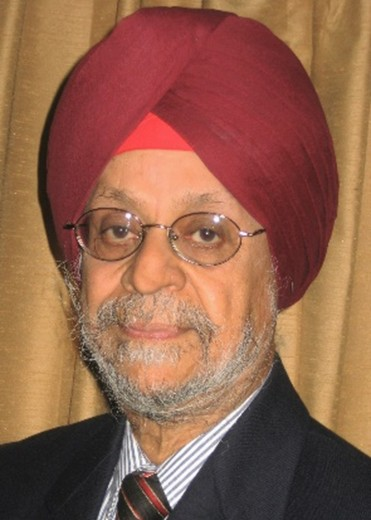

Indrajit Singh Chadha is a retired Indian diplomat belonging to the 1956 batch of the Indian Foreign Service who served as the Permanent Representative of India to the United Nations in Geneva from May 1990 to July 1991.

== Early life and education ==
Indrajit Singh Chadha was born in Rawalpindi, Punjab, British India (present-day Pakistan) on 9 July 1933. His father, the late Sardar Harnam Singh Chadha, was a Gold Medallist from Delhi University, India. He is married to Amrit, daughter of the late Sardar Waryam Singh, who was Inspector-General of Police of undivided Punjab, India, during 1958-59. He has three daughters: Priti Bhatia, Ph.D., Ritu Chadha, Ph.D., and Kamal Chadha.

He obtained an M.Sc. in Physics from Nagpur University in 1954. He also attended Oxford University in 1957–58 as part of training for the Indian Foreign Service, where he took courses in Arabic, Economics, European History, and International Law.

== Career ==
Chadha began his professional career in 1954 as Lecturer, at College of Science (now called Institute of Science), Nagpur University, where he taught Physics for two years before joining the Indian Foreign Service in 1956.

He was closely associated with the United Nations and other organizations in the UN system in various capacities throughout his entire career. His association with the world body began in 1965 with a posting as First Secretary in the Permanent Mission of India to UN in New York, where he was in charge of economic work; and he retired twenty-six years later as India's Ambassador to the United Nations and other International Organizations in Geneva in 1991.

During his tenure in New York, he served as Rapporteur of the Ad-Hoc Committee for United Nations Industrial Development Organization (UNIDO), United Nations Development Programme (UNDP) Governing Council, and the Second Committee (dealing with economic issues) of the United Nations General Assembly.

In 1968 he was appointed as Chargé d'affaires, Embassy of India, Amman. Before he could complete his three-year tenure, he was recalled to India, as a protest against Jordan's stand at the Islamic Summit held in Rabat, Morocco, in 1969, in response to the arson attack on the Al-Aqsa Mosque in Jerusalem. Despite an official invitation, the Indian delegation was not allowed to take a seat at the conference due to Pakistan's opposition. In protest India decided to recall its envoys from the host country, Morocco and Jordan who supported Pakistan's stand.

After spending about a year and a half on temporary duty in the Economic Division of the Ministry of External Affairs, New Delhi, he was posted as Deputy Chief of Mission in the Embassy of India at Brussels, where he dealt with two inter-governmental organizations: the EEC (European Economic Community - the fore-runner of the European Union) and the Customs Co-operation Council.

In 1972 he was transferred to Geneva as India's Representative to General Agreement on Tariffs and Trade (the fore-runner of the World Trade Organization) and UNCTAD (the United Nations Conference on Trade and Development). During his four-year tenure in Geneva, he assumed leading responsibilities in the work of both organizations.

At the General Agreement on Tariffs and Trade, he was the Chairman of the Committee on Trade and Development, which was established to deal with the special problems of developing countries. After the launch of the Tokyo round of Multilateral Trade Negotiations, he chaired the Negotiating Group on Quantitative Restrictions. He also chaired the Committee on Trade with Poland following Poland's application for membership in the General Agreement on Tariffs and Trade. He was a member of the Textiles Surveillance Body, a quasi-judicial body to deal with issues arising out of the implementation of the Long-Term Agreement (LTA) governing international trade in textiles.

He was the Chairman of the Co-ordinating Committee of the Group of 77 (Group of developing Countries established in the framework of UNCTAD) on issues of special concern to developing countries in the Tokyo Round of Multilateral Trade Negotiations.

In 1975 Chadha was elected Chairman of the UNCTAD Committee on Commodities, which considered the proposals for an ambitious “Integrated Programme for Commodities” and the establishment of a “Common Fund for Commodities” with the objective of improving the export earnings of developing countries. The conclusions of the Committee prepared the groundwork for the further consideration of these proposals at UNCTAD IV in Nairobi in 1976.

At Nairobi he was chosen to represent the Group of 77 in the negotiations for drafting the conclusions of the Conference on the issue of Commodities. Despite strong reservations of the developed countries, he managed to arrive at a consensus on a resolution incorporating the proposal for an “Integrated Programme for Commodities” and proposing the convening of a Conference to negotiate the establishment of a Common Fund.

Soon after the conclusion of UNCTAD IV, he joined the UNCTAD Secretariat as Adviser to the Secretary-General on the Integrated Programme for Commodities with the rank of Senior Director. His first task was to assist in the negotiations for the establishment of the Common Fund. The successful conclusion of the negotiations and the eventual establishment of the Common Fund earned him the epithet "The Creator of the Common Fund". He made an unsuccessful bid for election as the Managing Director of the Fund; and served as a member of its Advisory Committee after its establishment in Amsterdam during its formative years from 1991 to 1995.

After the conclusion of the negotiations on the Common Fund, he was charged with the responsibility of drafting the Rules and Regulations for the operations of the Fund. Towards the end of his assignment with UNCTAD Secretariat, he functioned as Officer-in-charge of the Commodities Division for a few months.

Upon his return to Indian headquarters in 1982, he assumed charge of the Economic Division of the Ministry of External Affairs, dealing with Multilateral Economic Relations. During his tenure at headquarters he was involved with the work of various inter-governmental bodies.

He was the Secretary General of the Meeting of Foreign Ministers of Bangladesh, Bhutan, India, Maldives, Nepal, Pakistan, and Sri Lanka held in New Delhi in 1983. This was the first Meeting of the seven countries at the political level within the framework of an informal Grouping then known as South Asian Regional Co-operation (SARC). The Meeting agreed on the institutional framework for the eventual establishment of South Asian Association for Regional Cooperation (SAARC).

During 1984–85 he was the Chairman of the U.N. Committee on Economic Cooperation among Developing Countries.

In 1985 he chaired the Negotiating Group at the fourth session of United Nations Industrial Development Organization in Vienna.

In 1985 he was appointed High Commissioner of India to Bangladesh. He was the first Indian Envoy to Bangladesh of the rank of Additional Secretary, and was elevated to the rank of Secretary before he completed his tenure in Dhaka. His appointment was reflective of India's desire to strengthen relations with neighbors. His choice was also in recognition of the role he had played in preparing the groundwork for the establishment of SAARC, as Secretary-General of the first meeting of the Foreign Ministers of the Member countries held in New Delhi. He arrived in Dhaka a few months before the first SAARC Summit where he was witness to the historic decision to establish SAARC.

In 1990 he returned to Geneva as Ambassador to United Nations and other International Organizations before his retirement in 1991. During this period he was Chairman of the Co-ordinating Committee of the Group of 77 to prepare for UNCTAD VIII scheduled to be held in Cartagena (Colombia) in 1992. He also chaired the working group to prepare for negotiating the Comprehensive Test Ban Treaty in the Committee of the Conference on Disarmament.

After his retirement, he had a brief stint as Advisor, Joint Business Councils jointly administered by Federation of Indian Chambers of Commerce & Industry and ASSOCHAM (Associated Chambers of Commerce and Industry of India) in 1994.

He relocated to Chandigarh in 1994 where he served as a Member of the Panjab University Senate for twelve years from 2008 to 2020. During his tenure as Senator, he led a crusade for drastic reform of the governance structure of the University, which had remained virtually unchanged since its establishment in 1882 under the British regime; and helped in preparing a comprehensive blueprint for the reforms.

== Articles ==
Chadha is a published author of several research papers and articles. Included below is a selection of his works:

- "The Integrated Programme for Commodities: A reply to the criticism at a hearing”. Intereconomics – Review of European Economic Policy (1966 - 1988), 1977, vol. 12, issue 9/10, 227-230.
- “The Common Fund for Commodities”. Trade and Development: An UNCTAD Review, No. 2, Autumn 1980, pages 97–109.
- “The North-South Negotiating Process in the Field of Commodities”. Commodities, Finance and Trade, Issues in North-South Negotiations, 1980, pages 3–39. Frances Pinter (Publications) Ltd. London.
- "The Integrated Programme for Commodities – an Assessment of Progress and Prospects," IDS Sussex Bulletin, January 1980, Vol. 11, no. 1, pp. 24–30.
- “ITPA and the Common Fund”. International Tea Journal, Rotterdam, Number 2, November 1981, pp. 9–10.
