= I.I.M.U.N. =

Youth organization with headquarters in India

India’s International Movement to Unite Nations (I.I.M.U.N.)
- India's International Movement To Unite Nations
- Abbreviation: I.I.M.U.N.
- Formation: 2011; 15 years ago
- Founded: 2011
- Founder: Rishabh Shah
- Type: Youth organization
- Headquarters: Mumbai
- Location: India
- Official language: English, Hindi
- Founder: Rishabh Shah
- Website: www.iimun.in
- Formerly called: India's International Model United Nations

I.I.M.U.N. (India's International Movement to Unite Nations) is a youth organisation, founded in 2011, that hosts academic simulations of United Nations sessions for students aged 13 to 22. It organizes events where participants role-play as diplomats and deliberate on local, national, and international issues in committee sessions. At its conferences, students represent bodies such as the United Nations Security Council and the United Nations Environment Programme, discussing topics like reforms to the Security Council.

I.I.M.U.N. has conducted conferences across India and internationally, and became the first organisation to hold a Model UN conference at the United Nations Headquarters. In addition to its educational activities, I.I.M.U.N. has organised large-scale public events, including a peace march supporting India’s bid for permanent membership in the Security Council, and the “Find a Bed” initiative during the COVID-19 pandemic to help patients locate hospital and quarantine facilities.

== History ==
In 2016, I.I.M.U.N. held several conference across India and internationally. Its first Dehradun chapter took place at Ecole Globale International Girls’ School, with over 400 students from twenty educational institutions participating. Committees simulated a range of bodies, including the World Trade Organization, the United Nations Security Council, and the Indian Cabinet. That same year, I.I.M.U.N. held its first international conference at the United Nations headquarters in New York City, followed by a large-scale conference in Mumbai that drew 7,500 students.

In September 2016, a chapter was held at the Kolhapur Institute of Technology (KIT), with approximately 200 student-delegates debating topics such as reforms to the Security Council. That same month, I.I.M.U.N. also organized a four-day conference at the Taj Mahal Palace Hotel in Mumbai, where 500 students from over 100 cities simulated the UN General Assembly and debated issues including terrorism and India’s bid for permanent membership in the Security Council. Speakers included lawyer and politician Ram Jethmalani, former Maharashtra Chief Minister Prithviraj Chavan, film director Rohit Shetty, and Prakash Shah, India’s former Permanent Representative to the United Nations.

== Public outreach ==
In April 2016, I.I.M.U.N. announced a peace march in Mumbai involving approximately 65,000 participants to advocate for India’s permanent membership in the United Nations Security Council. On the same day, over 10,000 students attended a Model United Nations conference organized by I.I.M.U.N. at Sardar Vallabhbhai Patel Stadium in Mumbai. I.I.M.U.N. describes itself as a non-political network of students aged 16 to 24, and organized the event to build youth support for India's role in international affairs.

In 2021, during India’s second wave of the COVID-19 pandemic, I.I.M.U.N. launched the “Find a Bed” initiative to help patients with mild symptoms or those who were asymptomatic locate available hospital and quarantine facilities. Developed over 72 hours by 194 student volunteers, the initiative created a multilingual website that listed more than 19,000 centers, including hospitals and hotels converted into quarantine spaces, across 446 Indian cities. According to I.I.M.U.N., more than 20,000 of its members volunteered to support the initiative. Prominent Bollywood actors, including Karan Johar, Shraddha Kapoor, and Boman Irani, supported the initiative by sharing information on bed availability through their platforms. The initiative also had a Bollywood cause ambassador.
