= Pinak Ranjan Chakravarty =

Indian diplomat and former High Commissioner of India to Bangladesh

His Excellency Pinak Ranjan Chakravarty IFS

High Commissioner of India to Bangladesh
- In office January 2007 – December 2009
- Preceded by: Veena Sikri
- Succeeded by: Rajeet Mitter

Ambassador of India to Thailand
- In office 2010–2011
- Preceded by: Latha Reddy
- Succeeded by: Anil Wadhwa

Personal details
- Occupation: Indian Foreign Service

Pinak Ranjan Chakravarty is a retired Indian diplomat and former High Commissioner of India to Bangladesh.

== Career ==
Chakravarty joined the Indian Foreign Service in 1977. He had served in diplomatic missions in London, Jeddah, and Cairo. From 1994 to 1995, he was Consul-General of India in Karachi, Pakistan.

Chakravarty was the Director of the 1995 SAARC Summit Secretariat. From 1995 to 1999, Chakravarty was a Counsellor at the Indian Embassy in Israel. He was the Deputy High Commissioner of India in Dhaka from 1999 to 2002.

From 2002 to 2006, Chakravarty was the chief of protocol at the Ministry of External Affairs. He was appointed Ambassador of India to the Philippines but quickly shifted to the High Commissioner of India to Bangladesh in 2007. He called for a redrawing of Bangladesh-India border to solve old issues such as enclaves. He served till 2010 when he was appointed the Ambassador of India to Thailand.

Chakravarty was appointed Special Secretary (Public Diplomacy) in 2011 and later he was made the Secretary of Economic Relations at the Ministry of External Affairs. He retired from government service in 2011.

Chakravarty cofounded thinktank DeepStrat, based in New Delhi. He is a visiting fellow of the Observer Research Foundation. He wrote Transformation- Emergence of Bangladesh and Evolution of India-Bangladesh Ties about Bangladesh-India relations. In 2018, he wrote that popular anger against perceived corruption of Awami League meant India had to be ready to talk with Khaleda Zia and the Bangladesh Nationalist Party.

On 28 March 2024, Chakravarty claimed the United States Ambassador to Bangladesh, Peter D. Haas, left the country following a strong warning from New Delhi to Washington DC about attempting regime change in Bangladesh. He believes India should support the ruling Awami League while viewing Bangladesh Nationalist Party as anti-Hindu and anti-India. Matthew Miller, spokesman for the US State Department, denied his comments about Haas hiding during the general elections in Bangladesh.
