= Preeti Saran =

Indian civil servant (born 1958)

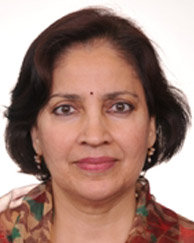

Secretary (East), Ministry of External Affairs, India
- In office March 2016 – 30 September 2018
- Preceded by: Anil Wadhwa
- Succeeded by: Vijay Thakur Singh

Indian Ambassador to Vietnam
- In office September 2013 – March 2016
- Succeeded by: P. Harish

Consul General of India, Toronto
- In office November 2008 – August 2013

Personal details
- Born: 5 September 1958 (age 68)
- Spouse: Pankaj Saran
- Children: 2 sons
- Education: Lady Shri Ram College for Women, University of Delhi
- Occupation: IFS
- Profession: Civil Servant

Preeti Saran (born 5 September 1958) is an Indian civil servant of the Indian Foreign Service cadre 1982 batch. In December 2018, Saran was elected unopposed to the United Nations Committee on Economic, Social and Cultural Rights for a term from 1 January 2019 to 31 December 2022 which was extended for up to December 2026.

== Personal life ==
Preeti Saran holds a B.A. (Honours) degree and Master of Arts degree in English from the Lady Shri Ram College for Women, University of Delhi. She is married to Pankaj Saran, who also belonged to the Indian Foreign Service and has served as Deputy National Security Adviser of India. They have two sons.

== Career ==
She joined the Indian Foreign Service in August 1982. She has served in Indian missions at Moscow, Dhaka, Cairo, Geneva, Toronto and Vietnam. Saran was the Consul General of India at Toronto and the Indian Ambassador to Vietnam. She served as the Secretary (East) in the Ministry of External Affairs, India from March 2016 to 30 September 2018.

From 1 January 2019 to 31 December 2022, Saran will be a member of the United Nations Committee on Economic, Social and Cultural Rights for a term from 1 January 2019 to 31 December 2022 which was extended till December 2026. She also acts as a mentor to Center for Strategic and Foreign Relations at Vision India Foundation.
