= Dnyaneshwar Mulay =

Indian diplomat (born 1958)

Dr Dnyaneshwar Manohar Mulay
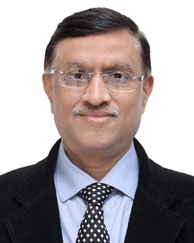

Member of the National Human Rights Commission
- In office April 2019 – April 2024

Secretary of Consular, Passport, Visa and Overseas Indian Affairs
- In office January 2016 – April 2019

Consul General of India, New York
- In office April 2013 – January 2016
- Preceded by: Prabhu Dayal
- Succeeded by: Riva Ganguly Das

High Commissioner of India, Male, Maldives
- In office April 2009 – March 2013

Foreign Service Advisor, Cabinet Secretariat, Government of India, New Delhi
- In office May 2006 – March 2009

Minister (Economic and Political), Embassy of India, Damascus, Syria
- In office August 2003 – May 2006

Deputy High Commissioner, High Commission of India, Mauritius
- In office July 2002 – July 2003

Director, Ministry of Finance (Department of Economic Affairs), New Delhi
- In office September 1998 – June 2002

First Secretary/Counselor, Economic/Commercial, Embassy of India Tokyo
- In office August 1995 – September 1998

First Secretary Economic/Commercial, Embassy of India, Moscow
- In office June 1992 – August 1995

Under Secretary, Ministry of Commerce, New Delhi
- In office January 1989 – May 1992

Third/Second Secretary, Embassy of India, Tokyo, Japan
- In office September 1984 – December 1988

Personal details
- Born: 5 November 1958 (age 67) Abdul Lat, Kolhapur district, Bombay State (present–day Maharashtra), India
- Spouse: Sadhna Shanker
- Children: A daughter and 2 sons
- Education: University of Mumbai; Shivaji University; Vidya Niketan School
- Occupation: Diplomat, Author, Columnist

Dnyaneshwar Mulay (Marathi: Jñānēśvar Muḷē) was born on 5 November 1958 in the Kolhapur district of Maharashtra, India, and is an Indian diplomat and author. He joined the Indian Foreign Service in 1983 and has since served in several capacities, including Consul General in New York and High Commissioner in Male, Maldives, retiring in February 2019 after 35 years of service. In April 2019 Mulay was appointed by the President of India as a member of the National Human Rights Commission, where he served until April 2024. He is currently serving as an advisor to the National Skill Development Corporation.

Mulay is a successful writer, having written over 15 books which have been translated into Arabic, Dhivehi, Urdu, Kannada and Hindi. His best-known work is Maati, Pankh ani Akash, which has been prescribed for the arts curriculum at North Maharashtra University, Jalgaon.

He has also inspired a number of socio-educational projects including Balodyan, an orphanage in his native village Lat, and the Dnyaneshwar Mulay Education Society, which seeks to promote global education.

== Early life and education ==
Dnyaneshwar Mulay was born in 1958 into a Marathi family in the village of Lat, in the Kolhapur district of Maharashtra. His father Manohar Krishna Mulay was a farmer and tailor and his mother Akkatai Mulay was a homemaker.

He completed his primary education in Lat, but at the age of ten left the village to join Rajarshi Shahu Chatrapati Vidyaniketan in Kolhapur, a school founded by the Zilla Parishad to nurture talent from rural areas. Subsequently he became the first student from a rural area to win the Jagannath Shankarsheth Award by securing the highest marks in Sanskrit at the 1975 Staff Selection Commission (SSC) exam.

Mulay received his BA in English literature from the Shahaji Chattrapati College in Kolhapur, winning the prestigious Dhananjay Keer Award for coming first. Wanting to join the civil service but realising there was a dearth of study resources and guidance in Kolhapur he relocated to Mumbai. In Mumbai he joined the State Institute for Administrative Careers, which provided him with the basic facilities for his studies. He later undertook a master's degree in labour studies at the Late Narayan Meghaji Lokhande Maharashtra Institute of Labour Studies (LNML MILS) in Mumbai. He also studied personnel management at Mumbai University, and won the Peter Alvarez Medal for coming first. He also came first in the 1982 Maharashtra Public Service Commission (MPSC) examination, and passed the Union Public Service Commission (UPSC) examination before being selected into the Indian Foreign Service.

In January 2017 the D.Y Patil University of Mumbai honoured him with a Doctor of Literature (honoris causa) for his "exemplary contribution to society".

== Early career ==
Dnyaneshwar Mulay worked as the Deputy Collector of Pune before joining the Indian Foreign Service in 1983. His first posting was as Third Secretary of the Indian Embassy to Japan in Tokyo, and subsequently as Second Secretary there. During his tenure in Japan, Mulay managed the 1988 cultural extravaganza Festival of India, which was held in more than twenty Japanese cities over a period of one year. During his stint as Second Secretary in Japan he also looked after economic relations, paving the way for many Japanese investments in India including those of Toyota Motors, NTT-Itochu, Honda Motors, and YKK.

After Japan, Mulay served in various capacities in the Indian embassies in Russia, Mauritius, and Syria. He was instrumental in handling the business relations between India and Russia, particularly the transition from state controlled "rupee – rouble" trade to direct trade. He also founded the Indian Business Association in Moscow, and was the founding president for two years. In Mauritius he streamlined and expedited Indian assistance for the Cyber Tower project and the Rajiv Gandhi Science Centre. In Syria he facilitated the Sahitya Akademy's Memorandum of Understanding (MOU) with the Arab Writers Association, its first outside India.

== High Commissioner of India to Male, Maldives ==
In April 2009 Mulay assumed office as the Indian High Commissioner in Male in Maldives. He served in this capacity until March 2013, successfully leading the Male High Commission through the difficult transfer of power in Maldives in February 2012, including the two-week-long refuge of President Mohamed Nasheed in the High Commission building.

He was also instrumental in strengthening the military relationship between India and Maldives, achieving cooperation between India, Maldives, and Sri Lanka in the maritime arena, and it was on his initiative that the Indian Cultural Centre in Maldives was established.

== Consul General of India, New York, US ==
Mulay began service as the Indian Consul General in New York on 23 April 2013, and during his tenure he facilitated various outreach initiatives to both the Indian diaspora and mainstream American society. In 2014 he introduced a popular monthly lecture series called Media India, and a similar lecture series called India: State by State that focussed on the Indian states was also well received. He also helped establish a film and literature club in order to introduce Indian movies and literature to the American population, appearing himself on Comedy Central's The Daily Show with Jon Stewart in an episode based on India's elections.

In response to the Swachh Bharat Abhiyan project to eliminate open defecation and improve solid waste management announced by Indian Prime Minister Narendra Modi in 2014, Mulay initiated a Swachh Consulate campaign in New York, setting a model for similar holistic cleansing campaigns by other Indian missions abroad. Mulay also launched the Consulate at Your Doorstep outreach program with the aim of deepening understanding of India-US relations by US decision-makers, as well as addressing the concerns of the community on passports, visas, and other matters.

== Academic, literary, and popular writing ==
Over the years, Dnyaneshwar Mulay has written for a number of academic and mainstream publications, in a number of languages.

He contributed a regular column to Loksatta entitled "Badalate Vishwa – Badalata Bharat - बदलते विश्व –" बदलता भारत" in Marathi language, and "Vishwachi Maze Ghar - विश्वची माझे घर" in Sakal, addressing various aspects of current global and national challenges and opportunities. From 2004 to 2006 he wrote a column entitled "Nokarshaiche Rang - नोकरशाहीचे रंग" (meaning "Colours of Bureaucratic Ink" in Marathi) for the Sadhana Weekly. The column threw light on the working of the bureaucracy in democratic India and was later published by Sadhana Weekly in book form. From January 2012 he wrote another column entitled "Phoolonke Rangase - फुलोंके रंगसे", and in 2015 he wrote the column "Manhattan Postcard" for the Sakal Times, which also appeared in the Daily Lokmat in 2016.

Mulay has written features and human-interest stories in English, Japanese, and Marathi which have been published in journals and periodicals such as Sakal, Lokmat, Maharashtra Times, Antarnad, Sadhana, and others. Portions of his writing have been included in text books in Karnataka and Japan. He also contributes to the literary pages of Hindu newspapers in English and to the daily Dainik Bhaskar in Hindi.

From 2008 to 2012 he was a member of various advisory boards of Sahitya Akademi, India's National Academy of Letters.

== Marathi language publications ==
- Jonaki जोनाकी (1984) – collection of poetry in Marathi, translated into Hindi in 1995
- Maati, Pankh aani Aakash 'माती पंख आणि आकाश' (1998) – autobiographical novel, translated into Kannada, Hindi, and English. Winner of the Kaushik Award from Satara for best literary work of the year and, in July 2021, best book in translation
- Door Rahila Gaon दूर राहिला गाव (2000) – epic poem of over 250 stanzas in rhyme
- Manoos Ani Mukkam माणूस आणि मुक्काम (2004) – book of essays on Delhi, Japan, Mauritius, and Damascus
- Rastach Vegala Dharala रस्ताच वेगळा धरला (2005) – collection of poetry in Marathi
- Russia Navya Dishanche Amantran रशिया – नव्या दिशांचे आमंत्रण (2006) – book about Russia after 1985, based on the author's first-hand experiences there during 1992–95
- Swatahteel Awakash स्वताहातील अवकाश (2006) – collection of Marathi poetry
- MumbaiShri Radha श्री राधा (2008) – translation of the poetry of Ramakant Rath into Marathi
- Nokarshahiche Rang नोकरशाईचे रंग (2009) – autobiographical book
- Gyanbachi Mekh ग्यानबाची मेख (2009) – collection of essays on a wide range of subjects
- Akash Mandap Prithivi Aasan आकाश मंडप पृथिवी आसन (2010) – collection of essays
- Sakal .. ji hot naahee सकाळ .. जी होत नाही ( 2018 ) – poems on the Middle East

== Hindi and Urdu language publications ==
- Ritu Ug Rahi Hai ऋतू उग राही है (1999) – collection of poems in Hindi
- Andar Ek Asmaan अन्दर एक आसमान (2002) – collection of poems in Urdu
- Man Ke Khalihanomein मन की खलिहानोमें (2005) – collection of poems in Hindi
- Subah hai ki hoti nahin सुबाह है की होती नहीं (2008) – collection of poems in Hindi and Urdu on the Middle East situation
- Shanti ki Afwayen शांती कि अफ़वाये (2017) – collection of Hindi poems

== English language publications ==
- "A comparative study of Post-World War-II Japanese and post-independence Marathi Poetry" (2002) – diagnostic review of the similarities and contrasts in the poetry of Japan and India, done whilst a Fellow of the Ministry of Human Resource Development, India
- Ahlan wa- Sahlan: A Syrian Journey (2006) – book on Syria, written jointly with Sadhna Shanker and published in English, Arabic and Hindi
- And The Gypsy Learned to Fly (2018) – autobiography
- Silent Chaos (2018) – collection of poems on Middle East

== Works based on Dnyaneshwar Mulay's life ==
- Gypsy (2015) – documentary film produced and directed by Dhananjay Bhawalekar highlighting the life and work of Dnyaneshwar Mulay, received the Special Jury Award at the Delhi Short Film Documentary Festival
- Dr. Dnyaneshwar Mulay: Passport Man of India (2016) – book by Deepa Deshmukh
- Passport Man of India (2022) – documentary directed by Dhananjay Bhawalekar highlighting Mulay's contributions to improving passport accessibility

== Awards and Achievements ==
In 2025 he received the Nilimarani Sahitya Samman for his contribution to Indian literature.

== Personal life ==
Dr Dnyaneshwar Mulay lives in Delhi with his wife Sadhna Shanker, who is an Indian Revenue Service officer. He has three children: Utsav, Agney, and Pujya.

== See also ==
- Indian literature
- Indian Foreign Service
- Indo-Maldivian relations
