= Pankaj Saran =

Indian diplomat (born 1958)

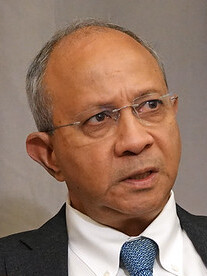

Deputy National Security Advisor of India
- In office 29 May 2018 – 31 December 2021 Serving with Rajinder Khanna, R. N. Ravi (till July 2019), Dattatray Padsalgikar
- Preceded by: Arvind Gupta
- Succeeded by: Vikram Misri

Indian Ambassador to Russia
- In office January 2016 – 2018
- Preceded by: P. S. Raghavan
- Succeeded by: D. B. Venkatesh Varma

Indian High Commissioner to Bangladesh
- In office March 2012 – December 2015
- Preceded by: Rajeet Mitter
- Succeeded by: Harsh Vardhan Shringla

Personal details
- Born: 22 November 1958 (age 67)
- Spouse: Preeti Saran
- Children: 2 sons
- Education: (B.A.); Hindu College, Delhi (M.A.) Delhi School of Economics; Delhi University
- Profession: Civil servant retired IFS Diplomat

Pankaj Saran (born 22 November 1958) is a retired Indian diplomat of the Indian Foreign Service who served as the Deputy National Security Adviser of India. He previously served as an Indian Ambassador to Russian Federation and Indian High Commissioner to Bangladesh.

== Personal life ==
Saran holds a B.A. (Honours) degree and Master of Arts degree in economics from the Hindu College and Delhi School of Economics respectively. His interests include tennis, golf, bridge and reading. He is married to Preeti Saran, who also belongs to the Indian Foreign Service. They have two sons.

== Career history ==
Pankaj Saran joined the Indian Foreign Service in August 1982. He has served at Indian missions in Moscow, Washington, D.C., Cairo and Dhaka. He was the Joint Secretary in the Prime Minister's Office, New Delhi from 2007 to 2012.

Saran was the Indian High Commissioner to Bangladesh in 2015 when the historic India-Bangladesh Land Boundary Agreement was ratified by the Parliament of India.

On 29 May 2018, Pankaj Saran was appointed by the Appointments Committee of the Cabinet as the Deputy National Security Advisor of India and served their till 31 December 2021.

Diplomatic posts
Preceded by Rajeet Mitter	High Commissioner of India to Bangladesh; 2012 - 2015	Succeeded by Harsh Vardhan Shringla
Preceded by P. S. Raghavan	Ambassador of India to Russia; 2016 - 2018	Succeeded by D. Bala Venkatesh Varma
