= Vivekananda International Foundation =

Indian public policy think-tank

- Abbreviation: VIF
- Formation: 2009
- Founder: Ajit Doval
- Type: Public policy think tank
- Headquarters: 3, San Martin Marg, Chanakyapuri, New Delhi – 110021
- Location: New Delhi, India
- Chairperson: Swaminathan Gurumurthy
- Vice Chaiperson: Satish Chandra
- Director: Arvind Gupta
- Parent organization: Vivekananda Kendra
- Website: www.vifindia.org

The Vivekananda International Foundation (VIF) is an Indian public policy think-tank set up by Vivekananda Kendra, a Sangh Parivar organisation. It is considered closely associated with the ruling Bharatiya Janata Party of India, even though the organisation denies any formal links. Swaminathan Gurumurthy, associated with another Sangh Parivar organisation Swadeshi Jagran Manch currently serves as its chairperson.

== Origins and history ==
The Vivekananda International Foundation (VIF) describes itself as an "independent, non-partisan institution that promotes quality research and in-depth studies." The Foundation was established in December 2009, by Vivekananda Kendra, a Sangh Parivar organisation, at a site in Delhi allotted to the latter by the P. V. Narasimha Rao government in 1993. Ajit Doval, who retired as the director of the Intelligence Bureau in 2005, became its founder Director. Swaminathan Gurumurthy, associated with another Sangh Parivar organisation Swadeshi Jagran Manch, was a force behind its creation. The Foundation made news in 2011–2012 when it was described as being instrumental in bringing together Anna Hazare, Arvind Kejriwal and Kiran Bedi, along with Baba Ramdev, to form the 'Team Anna'. The anti-corruption protests of the team which helped discredit the Indian National Congress government were run from the VIF.

In 2014, its director Ajit Doval was appointed by the Prime Minister Narendra Modi as India's National Security Advisor. The Prime Minister's Principal Secretary Nripendra Misra and the Additional Principal Secretary P. K. Mishra were also recruited from the Foundation's staff. The Prime Minister Modi is said to have been following the Foundation for some time and is impressed with its work.

The Foundation states that it has no formal organisational links with the RSS or the Bharatiya Janata Party. However, commentators have found Hindu nationalist ideas in several of its publications. The news magazine Tehelka has claimed that the Foundation supplied the intellectual inputs for the Narendra Modi campaign, defended him against charges in the Ishrat Jahan case, and spearheaded the Anna Hazare anti-corruption movement to undercut the United Progressive Alliance government.

== Output ==
The Foundation's primary output ranges from short articles and reports published online to monographs and occasional papers and a quarterly journal called National Security. In addition, the Foundation also holds regular seminars and a monthly discourse on contemporary subjects titled Vimarsh. The think tank has also worked with other think tanks on joint reports. A monthly magazine Vivek is brought out too.

== VIF Key members ==
VIF is currently headed by former Deputy NSA of India Arvind Gupta. S. Gurumurthy is the chairman, and former Deputy NSA and former head of National Security Council, Satish Chandra is the vice-chairman of the think tank.

Notable current and former members
Name	Position in Indian Government under PM Modi	Former Position	Reference
Ajit Doval	National Security Adviser of India	Director of Intelligence Bureau, IPS	
Nripendra Misra	Principal Secretary to PM Narendra Modi	Chairman of Telecom Regulatory Authority of India, IAS	
Anil Baijal	Lieutenant Governor of Delhi	Urban Development secretary, IAS	
Bibek Debroy	1)Member of NITI Aayog 2)Chairman of Economic Advisory Council to the Prime Minister	Professor at Centre for Policy Research, New Delhi	
V K Saraswat	Member of NITI Aayog	Director General of the DRDO	
K G Suresh	Director General, Indian Institute of Mass Communication	Senior Consulting Editor at Doordarshan	
P K Mishra	Additional Principal Secretary to PM Narendra Modi	Agriculture Secretary, IAS	
Arvind Gupta	Former Deputy National Security Adviser of India (2014–2017)	Secretary National Security Council Secretariat, IFS	
A. Surya Prakash	Chairperson of Prasar Bharati	Chief of Bureau of Indian Express	
C D Sahay	-	Chief of Research and Analysis Wing, IPS	
S G Inamdar	–	Vice Chief of Air Staff	
Srinivasapuram Krishnaswamy	–	Chief of Air Staff	
Kanwal Sibal	–	Foreign Secretary, IFS	
Balmiki Prasad Singh	–	Home Secretary, IAS	
Prabhat Kumar	–	Cabinet secretary, IAS	
Satish Chandra	–	Head, NSC Secretariat & Former Deputy National Security Advisor	
Tilak Devasher	Member, NSAB, National Security Council		
Lt Gen R K Sawhney (retd.)		Deputy Chief of Army Staff, and Director General Military Intelligence	

Many retired officers from Defence Forces/ Bureaucracy form the think resource. The members regularly meet to discuss upon subject, ranging from prevailing political, strategical and other administrative issues with an aim of resource development and promote nationalism.

== See also ==
- List of think tanks in India
- Observer Research Foundation
