= Indian Journal of International Law =

- Discipline: Law
- Language: English

Publication details
- History: 1960–present
- Publisher: Springer Science+Business Media on behalf of the Indian Society of International Law. (India)
- Frequency: Quarterly

Standard abbreviations
- ISO 4: Indian J. Int. Law

Links
- Journal homepage

The Indian Journal of International Law is a quarterly law review published by Springer Science+Business Media on behalf of the Indian Society of International Law. It was established in 1960 and the editor-in-chief is B. S. Chimni (Jawaharlal Nehru University).
