= Muchkund Dubey =

Indian diplomat (1933–2024)

Foreign Secretary of India
- In office 20 April 1990 – 30 November 1991
- Preceded by: Shilendra Kumar Singh
- Succeeded by: J.N. Dixit

High Commissioner of India to Bangladesh
- In office 1979–1982

Personal details
- Born: 1933 Deoghar, Bihar and Orissa Province, British India
- Died: 26 June 2024 (aged 90) Delhi, India

Muchkund Dubey (1933 – 26 June 2024) was an Indian diplomat and Foreign Secretary, the administrative head of the Indian Foreign Service, Government of India.

== Life and career ==
Dubey served as President of the Council for Social Development (CSI), and Chairman of the Asian Development Research Institute, Patna. He was also a Professor in International Relations at the Jawaharlal Nehru University, Delhi and a Professor Emeritus at the Foreign Service Institute.

Dubey died on 26 June 2024, at the age of 90.

== Works ==
- Dubey, Muchkund (1994). Communal revivalism in India: a study of external implications. New Delhi: Har-Anand Publications. ISBN 9788124101971.
- Dubey, Muchkund (1995). Indian society today: challenges of equality, integration, and empowerment. New Delhi: Har-Anand Publications. ISBN 9788124103296.
- Dubey, Muchkund (1998). Subhas Chandra Bose: the man and his vision. New Delhi: Har-Anand Publications. ISBN 9788124105825.
- Dubey, Muchkund; Balakrishnan, Rajiv (2008). Social development in independent India: paths tread and the road ahead. Delhi, India: Pearson Longman. ISBN 9788131772638.
- Dubey, Muchkund; Jabbi, M. K. (2009). A Social charter for India: citizens' perspective of basic rights. Delhi, India: Pearson Longman. ISBN 9788131726679.
- Dubey, Muchkund (2013). India's foreign policy: coping with the changing world. Delhi: Pearson. ISBN 9788131730577.
- Dubey, Muchkund; Hussain, Akmal (2014). Democracy, sustainable development, and peace: new perspectives on South Asia. New Delhi: Oxford University Press. ISBN 9780198092346.

Diplomatic posts
Preceded by K. P. S. Menon Jr.	High Commissioner of India to Bangladesh; 1979–1982	Succeeded by I. P. Khosla
Preceded by Shilendra Kumar Singh	Foreign Secretary of India; 1990–1991	Succeeded by J. N. Dixit
