= Gopalaswami Parthasarathy =

Indian diplomat

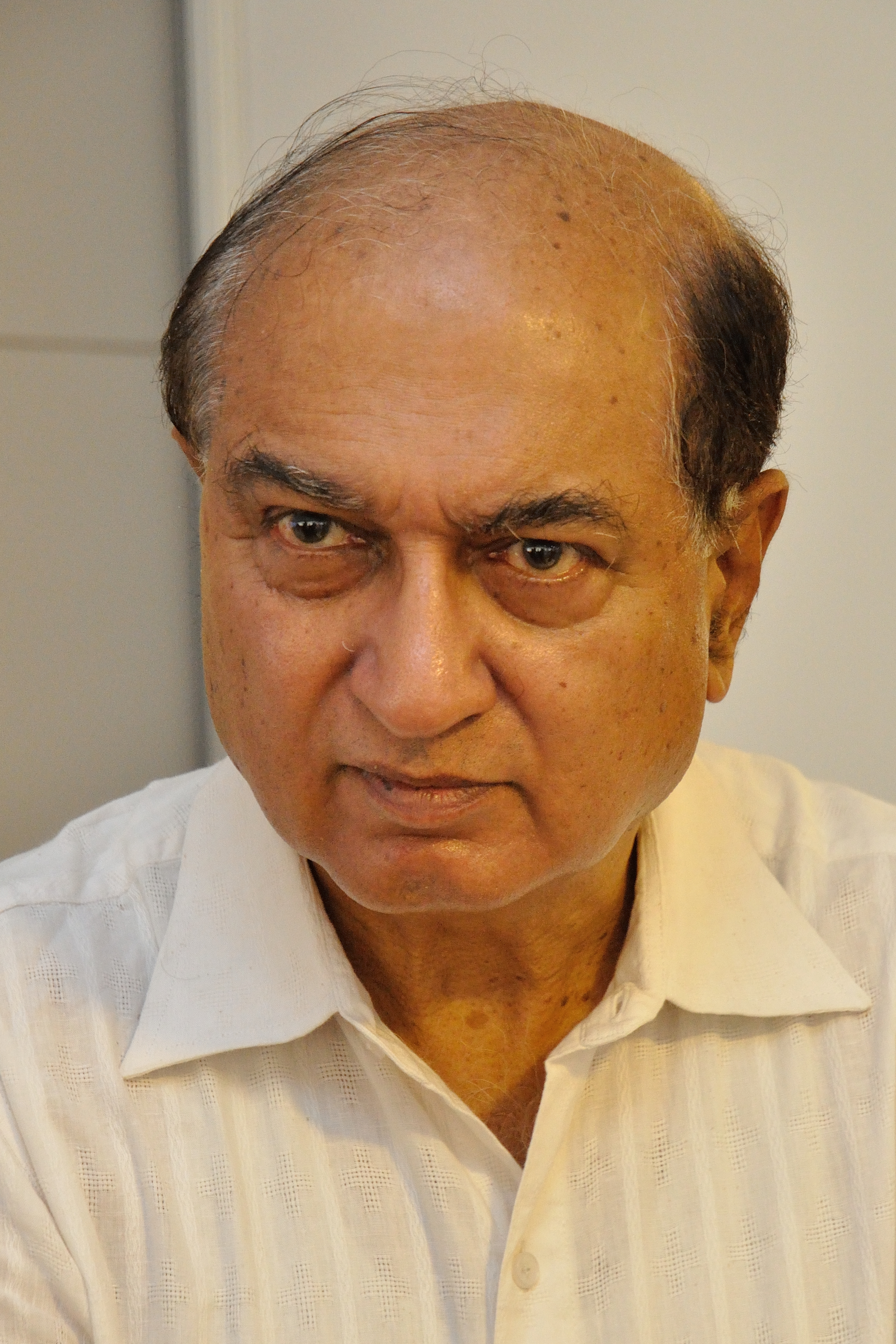
- Capt. G Parthasarathy

Indian Ambassador to Myanmar
- In office November 1992 – September 1995
- President: Shankar Dayal Sharma
- Preceded by: P.M.S Malik
- Succeeded by: L.T Pudaite

Indian High Commissioner to Australia
- In office 1995–1999
- Preceded by: A.M. Khaleli
- Succeeded by: C.P. Ravindranathan

High Commission of India to Pakistan
- In office February 1999 – May 2000
- President: K. R. Narayanan
- Preceded by: Satish Chandra
- Succeeded by: Vijay K. Nambiar

Personal details
- Born: 13 May 1940 (age 86)
- Education: College of Engineering, Guindy
- Occupation: Indian Army officer; Diplomat; Author

Captain Gopalaswami Parthasarathy, popularly known as G. Parthasarathy (born 13 May 1940) is a former commissioned officer in the Indian Army (1963-1968), a diplomat and author. He has served as the High Commissioner of India to Cyprus (1990–92), Ambassador of India to Myanmar, 1992–95, High Commissioner of India to Australia (1995–99) and the High Commissioner of India to Pakistan (1999-2000). Later he was the spokesperson of the Ministry of External Affairs and the Prime Minister's Office.

== Early life and background ==
He graduated with a B.E. Degree in Electrical Engineering from the College of Engineering, Guindy, Madras, (now Chennai) in 1962.

=== As a diplomat ===
In 1968, he joined the Indian Foreign Service, and his first diplomatic assignment was as the Third Secretary in the Embassy of India in Moscow from August 1970. For years he was known in the corridors of South Block (Secretariat Building) as "Chotta GP" ('chotta' is Hindi for small) to distinguish him from his namesake G Parthasarathy one of India's tallest diplomats, who served as India's High Commissioner to Pakistan between 1963 and 1965.

=== Other fields of work ===
He currently writes an influential column in The Pioneer, Business Line and Rediff.com, mostly on foreign affairs. In July 2018, he was appointed as the Chancellor of Central University of Jammu.

He co-authored a book with ex-Pakistan Foreign Secretary, Humayun Khan. The book, Diplomatic Divide, debates the issues that divide India and Pakistan.
