= Arvind Gupta (administrator) =

Indian civil servant (born 1953)

Director of Vivekananda International Foundation
- Incumbent
- Assumed office 24 September 2017

Deputy National Security Advisor of India
- In office 5 August 2014 – 5 August 2017
- Preceded by: Position Established
- Succeeded by: Pankaj Saran

Personal details
- Born: 10 July 1953 (age 72) Nurpur, Himachal Pradesh, India
- Occupation: Diplomat (IFS)

Arvind Gupta is a career civil servant of the Indian Foreign Service cadre and former Indian Deputy National Security Advisor (NSA) serving from 2014 to 2017. He was the ex officio Secretary, National Security Council Secretariat. He served as the Director General of the Institute for Defence Studies and Analyses from January 2012 till his appointment to the post of Deputy NSA.

He is currently serving as the director of the Vivekananda International Foundation, a public policy think tank situated in Delhi.

== Career ==
Dr. Gupta belongs to the 1979 batch of the Indian Foreign Service. Over the course of his career, he has served in various capacities at Indian diplomatic missions in Moscow, London and Ankara. He joined the National Security Council Secretariat shortly after it was set up in 1998 and served there till 2007. Prior to taking charge as Director General, he held the Lal Bahadur Shastri Chair on National Security in the IDSA from 2008 to 2012.

He was a member of the informal group constituted by the Prime Minister of India to revive the action plan on nuclear disarmament presented by Rajiv Gandhi at the Third Special Session on Disarmament of the UN General Assembly in June 1998. He has also worked in the Ministry of External Affairs on different assignments.

== Books and publications ==
- Arvind Gupta, India`s Nuclear Energy Programme: Challenges, Prospects and Public Concerns, 2014, Pentagon Press, ISBN 8182747813, 300 pages
- Arvind Gupta, Ideology and Soviet foreign policy : Lenin to Gorbachev, 1993, Venus Publ. House, ISBN 9788172380076, 251 pages
- Arvind Gupta, Mukul Chaturvedi, eds, Select documents on security and diplomacy, 2003, Manas Publications, ISBN 9788170491682, 391 pages
- Arvind Gupta, Mukul Chaturvedi, and Akshay Joshi, eds., Security and diplomacy : essential documents 2004, Manas Publications, ISBN 9788170492023, 548 pages
- Arvind Gupta, ed, India In A Changing Global Nuclear Order, 2010, Academic Foundation, ISBN 9788171887705, 312 pages
- Arvind Gupta, Amitav Mallik, and Ajey Lele, eds, Space Security: Need for Global Convergence 2012, Pentagon Press, ISBN 9788182746053
