= Prakash Shah =

Indian diplomat

Permanent Representative of India to the United Nations
- In office February 1995 – July 1997
- Preceded by: Mohammad Hamid Ansari
- Succeeded by: Kamalesh Sharma

Prakash Shah is an Indian diplomat. He has been Permanent Representative of India to the United Nations from February 1995 to July 1997. In August 1998, he was also appointed by Kofi Annan as special envoy to Baghdad during the arms conflict in Iraq. From 1977 to 1980, he also served as Joint Secretary to Prime Minister of India; Morarji Desai, Charan Singh and Indira Gandhi.

Currently, he is also on the Board of Advisors of India's International Movement to Unite Nations (I.I.M.U.N.) and also servers as the Chairperson of the Academic Advisory Council of I.I.M.U.N.
