= Subimal Dutt =

Indian diplomat and ICS officer (1903-1992)

Subimal Dutt OBE

3rd Foreign Secretary of India
- In office 11 October 1955 – 17 January 1961
- Preceded by: Ratan Kumar Nehru
- Succeeded by: M. J. Desai

Ambassador of India to Germany
- In office 1952–1954
- Preceded by: Office established
- Succeeded by: A. C. N. Nambiar

Personal details
- Born: 5 December 1903 Chittagong, Bengal Presidency, British India (now Chattogram, Bangladesh)
- Died: March 2, 1992 (aged 88) Calcutta (now Kolkata), West Bengal, India
- Education: University of Calcutta; SOAS University of London

Subimal Dutt (5 December 1903 - 2 March 1992) was an Indian diplomat and ICS officer. He served as India's Commonwealth Secretary and later as Foreign Secretary under Jawaharlal Nehru and was also India's ambassador to the Soviet Union, Federal Republic of Germany and Bangladesh.

== Early life and career ==
Subimal Dutt hailed from the village Kanungopara near Chittagong in erstwhile Bengal Presidency. He was educated at the University of Calcutta and the SOAS University of London and joined the ICS in 1928. He served in various capacities in Bengal districts. In 1938 he was transferred to Delhi to the Imperial Council of Agricultural Affairs to become an Additional Under-Secretary in the Department of Education, Health and Lands thereafter. In 1941, he was appointed the Government of India's Agent in Malaya. After his return in December 1941 he held various posts with the Government of Bengal, from April 1944 until 22 July 1947 as Secretary of the Department of Agriculture. He was appointed an Officer of the Order of the British Empire (OBE) in the 1946 Birthday Honours.

== Diplomatic career ==
In August 1947 he was appointed Commonwealth Secretary in the Ministry of External Affairs. From 1952-54, he was India's first ambassador to West Germany. He returned as Commonwealth Secretary in the Ministry of External Affairs (1954–55) and from 12 October 1955 to 11 April 1961 was the longest serving Foreign Secretary of India. As Commonwealth Secretary, along with V.K. Krishna Menon, Dutt was India's representative on the Political Committee at the Bandung Conference. As Foreign Secretary in the years leading up to the Sino-Indian War of 1962, Dutt was closely involved in policy formulation regarding Tibet and China. He was also involved in shaping India's response to the Suez and Hungarian crises which happened while he was the foreign secretary. He was appointed Indian Ambassador to the Soviet Union in June 1961, succeeding K.P.S. Menon. After his retirement from the Foreign Service in November 1962 he became Secretary to the President for two years. In 1964 he was appointed the first Vigilance Commissioner of West Bengal, from 1968 to January 1972 he held the post of the Central Vigilance Commissioner. Indira Gandhi in January 1972 on short term asked him to become India's first High Commissioner to Bangladesh in 1972. Dutt retired in April 1974 protesting against the visit of Pakistani Prime Minister Zulfikar Ali Bhutto to Bangladesh.

== Post-retirement ==
Between 1964 and 1968, Dutt served as the Vigilance Commissioner of West Bengal where, appalled at how corruption had become endemic in public life, he coined the term 'speed money' noting that it had become a way of life. He chaired the Industrial Licensing Policy Inquiry Committee, known as the Dutt Committee, whose report in 1969 led to the enactment of the Monopolies and Restrictive Trade Practices Act in India. Between 1968 and February 1972, he held the post of Central Vigilance Commissioner. He also authored With Nehru in the Foreign Office in 1977.

== Death ==
Subimal Dutt died on 2 March 1992 in Calcutta following a long illness. He was 88.

== Literature ==
1. Amit Das Gupta, Serving India. A political biography of Subimal Dutt (1903-1992), India's longest serving Foreign Secretary (New Delhi: Manohar, 2017).

2. Amit R. Das Gupta, "Foreign Secretary Subimal Dutt and the prehistory of the Sino-Indian border war", in: Das Gupta, Amit R., und Lüthi, Lorenz M., The Sino-Indian War in 1962: New Perspectives (New Delhi: Routledge, 2017): 48-67.

Diplomatic posts
Preceded by Ratan Kumar Nehru	Foreign Secretary of India; 1955 - 1961	Succeeded by M. J. Desai
