= M. L. Tripathi =

M. L. Tripathi, whose full name was Mani Lal Tripathi, was an Indian diplomat and ambassador. He was the High Commissioner of India to Mauritius and Bangladesh, as well as the ambassador to Romania and Japan.

== Career ==
Tripathi joined the Indian Foreign Service in 1970.

From September 1985 to August 1988, Tripathi served as the deputy high commissioner of India to Canada. He served as the consul general of India in Pakistan. In 1997, he was appointed the High Commissioner of India to Mauritius. He served in Mauritius till July 2000 and was replaced by Vijay Kumar.

In July 2000, Tripathi became High Commissioner of India to Bangladesh. In November 2002, the Ministry of Foreign Affairs of Bangladesh summoned him and protested the allegations of the deputy prime minister of India L. K. Advani about Bangladesh hosting terrorists. After the meeting, the Indian High Commission released a statement claiming it had evidence of the presence of the United Liberation Front of Asom and its leaders, Anup Chatia and Sanjiv Barua, in Bangladesh. It demanded they be handed over to India. He served as the High Commissioner till 2003. He was considered for the post of High Commissioner of India to Pakistan. His appointment was opposed by Brajesh Mishra, principal secretary to Prime Minister Atal Bihari Vajpayee, who preferred Shiv Shankar Menon.

Tripathi served as India's ambassador to Japan until 2006.

== Personal life ==
Tripathi was married to Shashi Tripathi.

== Death ==
Tripathi died on 1 December 2012.
