= K. P. S. Menon Jr. =

Indian diplomat (1929–2019)

15th Foreign Secretary of India
- In office January 1987 - February 1989
- Preceded by: A. P. Venkateswaran
- Succeeded by: Shilendra Kumar Singh

Ambassador of India to China
- In office 26 March 1985-12 February 1987
- Preceded by: Katyayani Shankar Bajpai
- Succeeded by: C. V. Ranganathan

Personal details
- Died: September 28, 2019 Thiruvananthapuram

Kizhake Palat Sankara Menon was an Indian diplomat.

== Early life and background ==
He was the son of K. P. S. Menon Sr. Menon studied at The Doon School, and St. Stephen's College in Delhi and later at the Oxford University.

== Career ==
He joined the Indian Foreign Service in 1951. He served as the Indian ambassador to China, and later as the Foreign Secretary.

Menon died in Thiruvananthapuram at the age of 90 and was cremated.

Diplomatic posts
Preceded by A. P. Venkateswaran	Ambassador of India to China; 1985 - 1987	Succeeded by C. V. Ranganathan
Preceded by A. P. Venkateswaran	Foreign Secretary of India; 1987 - 1989	Succeeded by Shilendra Kumar Singh
