= List of ambassadors and high commissioners of India =

Ambassadors and High Commissioners of India
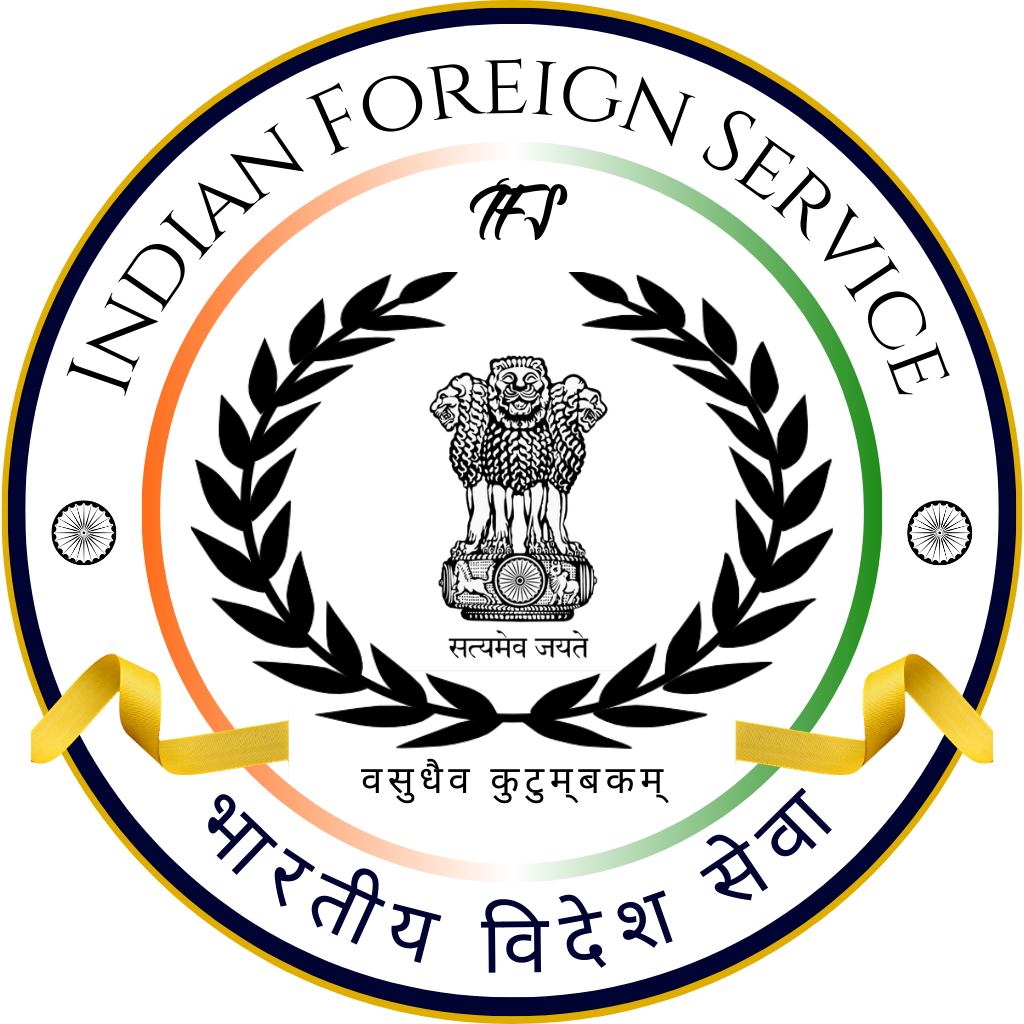
- Seal of the Indian Foreign Service

- Ministry of External Affairs of India

Agency overview
- Motto: Vasudhaiva Kutumbakam "The World is One Family"

This is a list of currently serving ambassadors, high commissioners and permanent representatives of India. High commissioners lead India's diplomatic missions in member states of the Commonwealth of Nations and ambassadors lead diplomatic missions in other states. The head of a diplomatic mission to an international organization is called a permanent representative. All ambassadors, high commissioners and permanent representatives of India are appointed by the Ministry of External Affairs and are almost always career diplomats and members of the Indian Foreign Service.

== Current ambassadors and high commissioners ==
=== Africa ===
Host country	List	Ambassador/High Commissioner	Appointed	Websites	Refs
Algeria	List	Dr. Swati Vijay Kulkarni	April 2024	EOI, Algiers	
Angola	List	Dr. Vidhu P Nair	February 2024	EOI, Angola	
Botswana		Bharath Kumar Kuthati	July 2023	HCI, Gaborone	
Burkina Faso		Om Prakash Meena	January 2025	EOI, Ouagadougou	
Cameroon		Vijay Khanduja	May 2024	HCI, Yaounde	
DR Congo Accredited to: Gabon; Central African Republic		V. Venkataraman	September 2024	EOI, Kinshasa	
Congo, Republic of		Madan Lal Raigar	September 2024	EOI, Brazzavile	
Cote D'Ivoire Accredited to: Liberia		Lakshmanan Ramesh Babu	June 2026	EOI, Abidjaan	
Djibouti		M. Keivom	August 2024	EOI, Djibouti	
Egypt Accredited to: Arab League	List	Suresh K. Reddy	May 2025	EOI, Cairo	
Equatorial Guinea		Prashant Kumar Das	July 2023	EOI, Malabo	
Eswatini		N Ram Prasad	August 2023	HCI, Mbabane	
Eritrea		Raj Kamal	January 2026	HCI, Asmara	
Ethiopia Accredited to: African Union		Anil Kumar Rai	February 2024	EOI, Addis Ababa	
Ghana		Surinder Bhagat	April 2026	HCI, Accra	
Guinea		Sandeep Sood	January 2026	EOI, Conakry	
Kenya	List	Adarsh Swaika	July 2025	HCI, Nairobi	
Liberia		Manoj Bihari Verma	January 2025	EOI, Monrovia	
Libya		Hifzur Rahman	November 2025	EOI, Tripoli	
Madagascar	List	Vacant	November 2022	EOI, Antanarivo	
Malawi		Amararam Gujar	July 2025	HCI, Lilongwe	
Mali		Dr.N.Nandakumar	November 2019	EOI, Bamako	
Mauritania		Neeraj Agrawal	January 2026	EOI, Nouackchott	
Mauritius		Anurag Srivastava	December 2024	HCI, Port Louis	
Morocco	List	Sanjay Rana	September 2024	EOI, Rabat	
Mozambique		Robert Shetkintong	November 2023	HCI, Maputo	
Namibia		Rahul Shrivastava	November 2024	HCI, Windhoek	
Niger		Sita Ram Meena	May 2024	EOI, Niamey	
Nigeria (Note: Along with Chad) Accredited to: Benin; ECOWAS		Abhishek Singh	October 2025	HCI, Abuja	
Senegal		Dinkar Asthana	August 2022	EOI, Dakar	
Seychelles		Rohit Rathish	September 2025	HCI, Victoria-Mahe	
South Africa Accredited to: Lesotho	List	Prabhat Kumar	August 2, 2023	HCI, Pretoria	
Sudan	List	Vacant		EOI, Khartoum	
Tanzania	List	Bishwadip Dey	June 2024	HCI, Dar Es Salaam	
Tunisia		Devyani Uttam Khobragade	November 6, 2026	EOI, Tunis	
Zambia		Alok Ranjan Jha	December 2024	HCI, Lusaka	
Zimbabwe		Bramha Kumar	April 2024	EOI, Harare	

=== Asia ===
Host country	List	Ambassador/High Commissioner	Appointed	Websites	Refs
Afghanistan		Karan Yadav, chargé d'affaires	October 2025		
Bahrain		Vinod K Jacob	August 2023	EOI, Bahrain	
Bangladesh	List	Dinesh Trivedi	Apr 2026	HCI, Dhaka	
Bhutan	List	Sandeep Arya	August 2025	EOI, Thimpu	
Brunei Darussalam		Ramu Abbagani	July 2025	HCI, Brunei	
Cambodia		Vanlalvawna Bawitlung	January 2025	EOI, Phonm Penh	
China	List	Vikram Doraiswami	March 2026	EOI, Beijing	
Indonesia	List	Sandeep Chakravorty	August 2023	EOI, Jakarta	
Iran	List	Rudra Gaurav Shreshth	May 2023	EOI, Tehran	
Iraq		Soumen Bagchi	November 2024	EOI, Baghdad	
Israel	List	Jitender Pal Singh	January 2025	EOI, Tel Aviv	
Japan	List	Nagma Mohamed Mallick	September 2025	EOI, Tokyo	
Jordan		Manish Chauhan	May 2024	EOI, Amman	
North Korea		Aliawati Longkumer	June 2025		
South Korea	List	Gourangalal Das	September 2025	EOI, Seoul	
Kazakhstan		Manish Chauhan	June 2023	EOI, Astana	
Kuwait		Paramita Tripathi	October 2022	EOI, Kuwait	
Kyrgyzstan		Birender Singh Yadav	December 2024	EOI, Bishkek	
Lebanon		Md. Noor Rahman Sheikh	June 2023	EOI, Beirut	
Malaysia	List	B. Nagabhushana Reddy	August 2021	HCI, Kuala Lumpur	
Maldives		G. Balasubramanian	December 2024	HCI, Male	
Mongolia		Atul Malhari Gotsurve	March 2024	EOI, Ulaanbaatar	
Myanmar	List	Abhay Thakur	April 2024	EOI, Yangon	
Nepal		Naveen Srivastava	June 2022	EOI, Kathmandu	
Oman		Prashant Pise	May 2026	EOI, Muscat	
Pakistan	List	Geetika Srivastava, chargé d'affaires	August 2023	HCI, Islamabad	
Philippines Accredited to: Palau; Federated States of Micronesia		Harsh Kumar Jain	April 2024	EOI, Manila	
Qatar	List	Vipul	August 2023	EOI, Doha	
Saudi Arabia		Vipul	June 2026	EOI, Riyadh	
Singapore	List	Shilpak Ambule	June 2023	HCI, Singapore	
Sri Lanka	List	Santosh Jha	December 2023	HCI, Colombo	
Tajikistan		Rajesh Uike	March 2024	EOI, Dushanbe	
Thailand		Puneet Agrawal	May 2025	EOI, Bangkok	
Turkmenistan		Bandaru Wilsonbabu	October 2025	EOI, Ashgabat	
United Arab Emirates	List	Dr. Deepak Mittal	October 2025	EOI, Abu Dhabi	
Uzbekistan		Smita Pant	December 2023	EOI, Tashkent	
Vietnam	List	Tshering W. Sherpa	September 2025	EOI, Hanoi	
Yemen		Suhel Ajaz Khan	June 2024		

=== Europe ===
Host country	List	Ambassador/High Commissioner	Appointed	Websites	Refs
Albania		Ravindra Prasad Jaiswal	January 2025	EOI, Tirana	
Armenia		Nilakshi Saha Sinha	March 2023	EOI, Yerevan	
Austria		Shambu S. Kumaran	April 2024	EOI, Vienna	
Azerbaijan		Abhay Kumar		EOI, Baku	
Belarus		Ashok Kumar	December 2024	EOI, Minsk	
Belgium Accredited to: European Union; Luxembourg		Pranay Kumar Verma	April 2026	EOI, Brussels	
Bulgaria		Arun Kumar Sahu	December 2024	EOI, Sofia	
Croatia		Arun Goel	September 2024	EOI, Zagreb	
Cyprus		Mr Manish	May 2024	HCI, Nicosia	
Czech Republic	List	Raveesh Kumar	September 2024	EOI, Prague	
Denmark	List	Manish Prabhat	April 2024	EOI, Copenhegen	
Estonia		Ashish Kumar Sinha	April 2025	EOI, Tallinn	
Finland	List	Hemant H. Kotalwar	June 2024	EOI, Helsinki	
France Accredited to: Monaco	List	Sanjeev Singla	July 2025	EOI, Paris	
Germany	List	Ajit Gupte	October 2024	EOI, Berlin	
Greece	List	Rudrendra Tandon	March 2023	EOI, Athens	
Hungary Accredited to: Bosnia and Herzegovina		Anshuman Gaur	October 2025	EOI, Budapest	
Iceland		R Ravindra	July 2025	EOI, Reykjavik	
Ireland	List	Manish Gupta	October 2025	EOI, Dublin	
Italy		Vani Rao	April 2024	EOI, Rome	
Latvia		Namrata S Kumar	January 2025	EOI, Riga	
Lithuania		Devesh Uttam	July 2023	EOI, Vilnius	
Malta		Rachita Bhandari	March 2026	HCI, Malta	
Netherlands		Mr Kumar Tuhin	June 2024	EOI, Hague	
Norway		Gloria Gangte	September 2025	EOI, Oslo	
Poland		Neeta Bhushan	February 2026	EOI, Warsaw	
Portugal		Puneet Roy Kundal	August 2024	EOI, Lisbon	
Romania Accredited to: Moldova	List	Manoj Kumar Mohapatra	July 2025	EOI, Bucharest	
Russia	List	Vinay Kumar	March 2024	EOI, Moscow	
Serbia		Abhishek Shukla	September 2025	EOI, Belgrade	
Slovak Republic		Vishvas Vidu Sapkal	June 20, 2026	EOI, Bratislava	
Slovenia		Amit Narang	March 2025	EOI, Ljubljana	
Spain Accredited to: Andorra		Jayant N. Khobragade	September 2025	EOI, Madrid	
Sweden Accredited To: Latvia		Anurag Bhushan	June 2025	EOI, Stockholm	
Switzerland Accredited To: Liechtenstein	List	Mridul Kumar	June 2023	EOI, Berne	
Turkey		Shri Muktesh K. Pardeshi	November 2024	EOI, Ankara	
Ukraine		Ravi Shankar	May 2024	EOI, Kyiv	
United Kingdom	List	Periasamy Kumaran	March 2026	HCI, London	

=== North America ===
Host country	List	Ambassador/High Commissioner	Appointed	Websites	Refs
Canada		Dinesh K. Patnaik	August 2025	HCI, Ottawa	
Cuba		T. Armstrong Changsan	March 2024	EOI, Havana	
Guatemala Accredited to: Honduras; El Salvador		Raj Kumar Singh	September 2025	EOI, Guatemala	
Jamaica Accredited to: The Bahamas; Turks and Caicos Islands; Cayman Islands; British Virgin Islands		Mayank Joshi	June 2024	HCI, Kingston	
Mexico		Dr. Pankaj Sharma	February 2022	EOI, Mexico City	
Trinidad and Tobago		Pradeep Rajpurohit	October 2023	HCI, Port of Spain	
United States	List	Vinay Mohan Kwatra	August 2024	EOI, Washington, D.C.	

=== South America ===
Host country	List	Ambassador/High Commissioner	Appointed	Websites	Refs
Argentina		Ajaneesh Kumar	August 2025	EOI, Buenos Aires	
Bolivia		Rohitkumar R. Vadhwana	March 2025	EOI, La Paz	
Brazil	List	Dinesh Bhatia	June 2025	EOI, Brasilia	
Chile		Abhilasha Joshi	June 2024	EOI, Santiago	
Colombia		Vinod J. Bahade	May 2026	EOI, Bogota	
Guyana		Vacant	September 2023	HCI, Georgetown	
Paraguay		Piyush Singh	August 2025	EOI, Asuncion	
Peru	List	Vishvas Vidu Sapkal	June 2023	EOI, Lima	
Suriname Accredited to: Barbados; Saint Lucia; Saint Vincent and the Grenadines		Subhash Prasad Gupta	2024 07	EOI, Paramaribo	
Uruguay		Dr. Binoy George	2026 06		
Venezuela		Ashok Babu	2023 11	EOI, Caracas	

=== Oceania ===
Host country	List	Ambassador/High Commissioner	Appointed	Websites	Refs
Australia Accredited to: Nauru	List	Nagesh Singh	December 2025	HCI, Canberra	
Fiji Accredited to: Nauru; Tuvalu; Cook Islands		Suneet Mehta	December 2024	HCI, Suva	
New Zealand Accredited to: Niue; Samoa; Cook Islands; Vanuatu		Muanpuii Saiawi	April 2026	HCI, Wellington	
Papua New Guinea Accredited to: Solomon Islands		Rajeev Kumar	April 2026	HCI, Port Moresby	

=== Honorary consuls ===
Host country	High Commissioner / Ambassador	Refs
Antigua & Barbuda	Amit Telang	
Aruba		
Barbados		
Belize	Shamim Aktar	
Benin		
Chad	Abhay Thakur	
Comoros	Abhay Kumar	28 May 2019 (Note: additional charge with Madagascar)
Costa Rica	Upendra Singh Rawat	3 December 2019-12-03 (Note: additional charge with Nicaragua and Panama)
Dominican Republic		
Estonia	Radha Venkataraman	17 May 2019
Ecuador	Sanjiv Ranjan (Note: additional charge with Colombia)	2019 09 02
El Salvador		
Gabon	Nina Tshering La	(Note: additional charge along with Democratic Republic of the Congo)
Gambia	G. V. Srinivas	2019 10 24 (Note: additional charge with Guinea and Cape Verde)
Georgia	Kishan Dan Dewal (Note: additional charge with Armenia)	2019 10 11
Guinea (with Cape Verde)	G. V. Srinivas	2019 09 23 (Note: additional charge on 2019 10 22)
Haiti		
Honduras		
Liberia	Y. K. Sailas Thangal	
Lithuania		
Luxembourg		
Mauritania		
Montenegro	Jaideep Mazumdar	
Netherlands Antilles		
Nicaragua (with Panama)	Upendra Singh Rawat	2019 10 18 (Note: additional charge of Panama since 19 July 2019)
North Macedonia		
Réunion		
Saint Kitts and Nevis	Amit Telang	
Saint Vincent and the Grenadines	Junior Bacchus	
Saint Lucia		
Sierra Leone		
Togo	M. S. Padmaja	2019 11 13

== Permanent representatives to international organizations ==
Host organization	Location	Permanent Representatives and Deputy Representatives	Took office	Ref.
Conference on Disarmament	Geneva	Shamim Aktar	11 November 2018	
Caribbean Community	Georgetown, Guyana	Amit Telang	December 2023	
European Union^{[EU]}	Brussels	Pranay Verma	26 May 2026	
United Nations	New York City	Parvathaneni Harish (Permanent Representative of India to the United Nations)	September 1, 2024	
United Nations	Geneva	Arindam Bagchi	January 2024 (Permanent Representative of India to the United Nations in Geneva)	
UNESCO	Paris	Vishal V. Sharma	October 2020	
World Trade Organisation	Geneva	Brajendra Navneet	29 June, 2021	
ASEAN	Jakarta	Jayant N. Khobragade	20 January 2021	
African Union^{[AU]}	Addis Ababa	Robert Shetkintong	March 2020	
IAEA	Vienna	Malina Paul	Jan 2022	

- ^{AU} – Since March 2005, Indian Ambassador appointed to Ethiopia, with office in Addis Ababa, is also concurrently accredited as the Permanent Representative of India to the African Union.
- ^{EU} – Indian Ambassador appointed to the Kingdom of Belgium, with office in Brussels, is also concurrently accredited as the Permanent Representative of India to the European Union.

== See also ==
- Foreign relations of India
- List of ambassadors and high commissioners to India
- List of ambassadors of India
- List of diplomatic missions of India
- List of diplomatic missions in India
- Visa policy of India
- Visa requirements for Indian citizens
