= Lists of ambassadors of India =

List of ambassadors of India may refer to:

- List of ambassadors of India to Algeria
- List of ambassadors of India to Angola
- List of ambassadors of India to Bhutan
- List of ambassadors of India to Brazil
- List of ambassadors of India to China
- List of ambassadors of India to the Czech Republic
- List of ambassadors of India to Egypt
- List of ambassadors of India to Finland
- List of ambassadors of India to France
- List of ambassadors of India to Germany
- List of ambassadors of India to Greece
- List of ambassadors of India to Iran
- List of ambassadors of India to Israel
- List of ambassadors of India to Japan
- List of ambassadors of India to Madagascar
- List of ambassadors of India to Peru
- List of ambassadors of India to Romania
- List of ambassadors of India to Russia
- List of ambassadors of India to Sudan
- List of ambassadors of India to Switzerland
- List of ambassadors of India to the United Arab Emirates
- List of ambassadors of India to the United States

== See also ==
- List of ambassadors and high commissioners to India
- Indian embassy (disambiguation)
