= Lists of high commissioners of India =

List of high commissioners of India may refer to:

- List of high commissioners of India to Australia
- List of high commissioners of India to Bangladesh
- List of high commissioners of India to Kenya
- List of high commissioners of India to Malaysia
- List of high commissioners of India to Pakistan
- List of high commissioners of India to Sri Lanka
- List of high commissioners of India to Tanzania
- List of high commissioners of India to the United Kingdom

== See also ==
- List of ambassadors and high commissioners to India
- Indian embassy (disambiguation)
