= Muktesh Pardeshi =

Indian diplomat

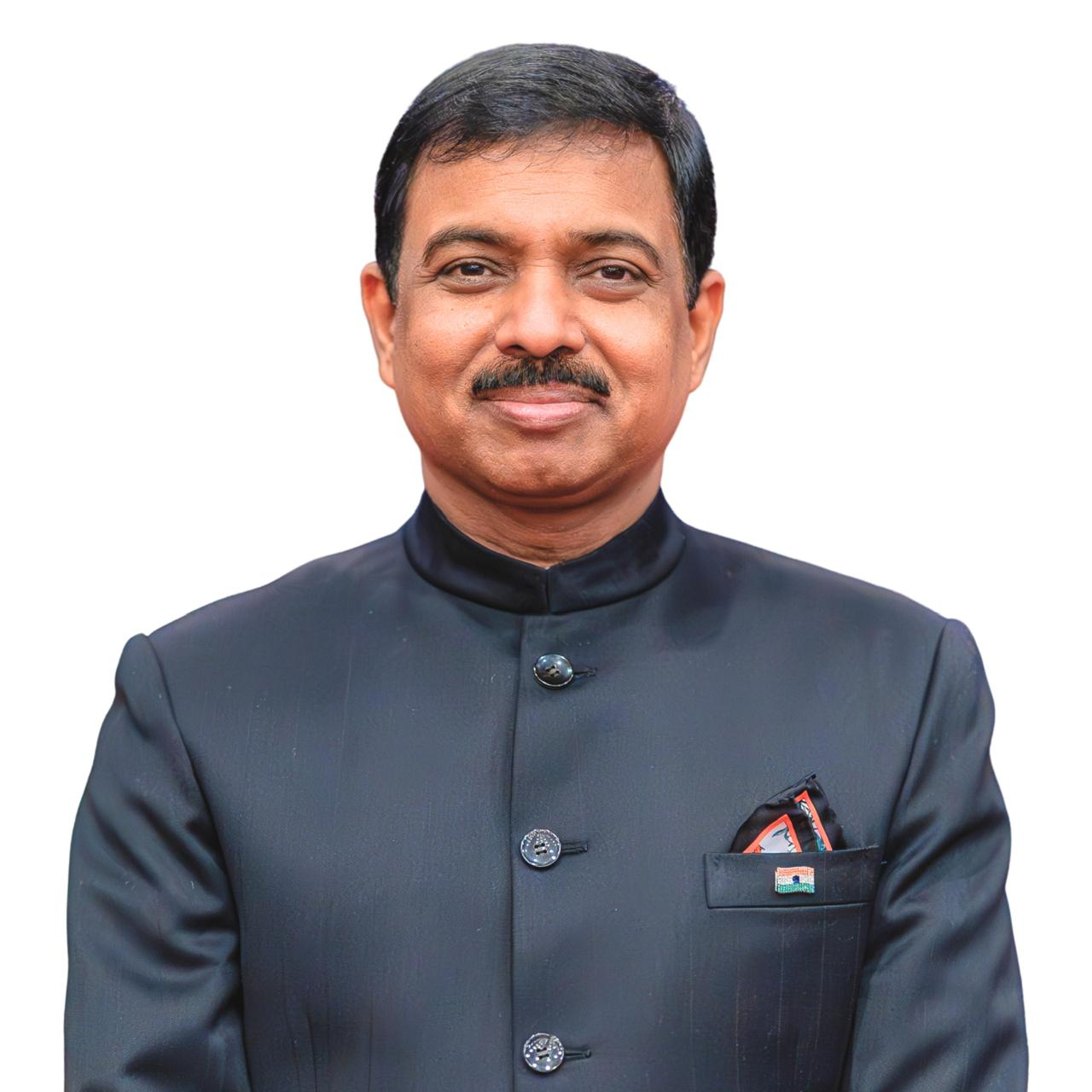

Ambassador of India to Türkiye
- Incumbent
- Assumed office November 2024
- President: Droupadi Murmu
- Prime Minister: Narendra Modi
- Preceded by: Virander Paul

Secretary (CPV & OIA), Ministry of External Affairs
- In office October 2023 – November 2024
- President: Droupadi Murmu
- Prime Minister: Narendra Modi
- Preceded by: Ausaf Sayeed
- Succeeded by: Arun Kumar Chatterjee

High Commissioner of India to New Zealand
- In office July 2019 – July 2022
- President: Ram Nath Kovind
- Prime Minister: Narendra Modi
- Preceded by: Sanjiv Kohli
- Succeeded by: Neeta Bhushan

Ambassador of India to Mexico
- In office April 2016 – June 2019
- President: Pranab Mukherjee
- Prime Minister: Narendra Modi
- Preceded by: Sujan Chinoy
- Succeeded by: Manpreet Vohra

Personal details
- Born: 1966 (age 59–60)
- Spouse: Rakhi Pardeshi
- Children: 2
- Education: University of Delhi
- Occupation: Diplomat

Military service
- Years of service: 1991 - Present
- Rank: Secretary

Muktesh Pardeshi is an Indian diplomat and civil servant of the Indian Foreign Service (IFS).

He has served in various diplomatic and administrative positions within the Government of India, representing India in bilateral and multilateral engagements.

Pardeshi is the current Ambassador of India to Turkey.

Pardeshi previously served as Secretary (CPV & OIA), Ambassador of India to Mexico, High Commissioner of India to New Zealand and Joint Secretary and Chief Passport Officer in the Ministry of External Affairs (India).

== Early life and education ==
Muktesh Kumar Pardeshi was born in Bihar, India. He completed his graduation from Hindu College, Delhi. and Master of Arts from Delhi School of Economics, University of Delhi, and a Diploma in Spanish from the National Autonomous University of Mexico.

== Diplomatic career ==
Pardeshi joined the Indian Foreign Service in 1991. During his diplomatic career, he has held several positions in the Ministry of External Affairs and at Indian diplomatic missions abroad.

During his tenure, Pardeshi has contributed to India's foreign policy initiatives, diplomatic relations, and international cooperation efforts.

Muktesh Pardeshi served as the Ambassador of India to Mexico from April 2016 to June 2019. Bilateral trade between the two countries crossed US$10 billion for the first time and India also became one of Mexico's top 10 trading partners in 2018.

He has served as High Commissioner of India to New Zealand from 2019 to 2022, with concurrent accreditation to Samoa, Niue, Vanuatu, and the Cook Islands.

In 2022 Pardeshi appointed as Special Secretary operations India's G20 Presidency Secretariat.

In 2023 he served as Secretary (CPV & OIA) in the Ministry of External Affairs (India).

Pardeshi has contributed his services to India as Joint Secretary and Chief Passport Officer in the Ministry of External Affairs. He handled matters relating to India's relations with Gulf and West Asia and North Africa (WANA) countries.

Pardeshi was appointed as Ambassador of India to Republic of Turkey in November 2024.

=== Notable contributions ===
In June 2024, Pardeshi has represented India at a high-level conference in Amman, Hashemite Kingdom of Jordan on urgent humanitarian response for Gaza.

== Awards & recognition ==
- Web Ratna (Platinum) Award 2014
- National Award on e- Governance (Gold)
- Lifetime achievement award from Hindu College, Delhi
