= Manpreet Vohra =

Retired Indian diplomat

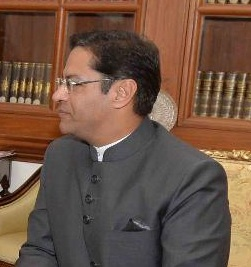

Indian High Commissioner to Australia
- In office 25 April 2021 – 31 December 2023
- Preceded by: A. Gitesh Sarma
- Succeeded by: Gopal Baglay

Ambassador of India to Mexico
- In office 7 July 2019 – 21 March 2021
- Preceded by: Muktesh Pardeshi

Ambassador of India to Afghanistan
- Succeeded by: Vinay Kumar

Personal details
- Born: 28 December 1963 (age 62)
- Education: Panjab University

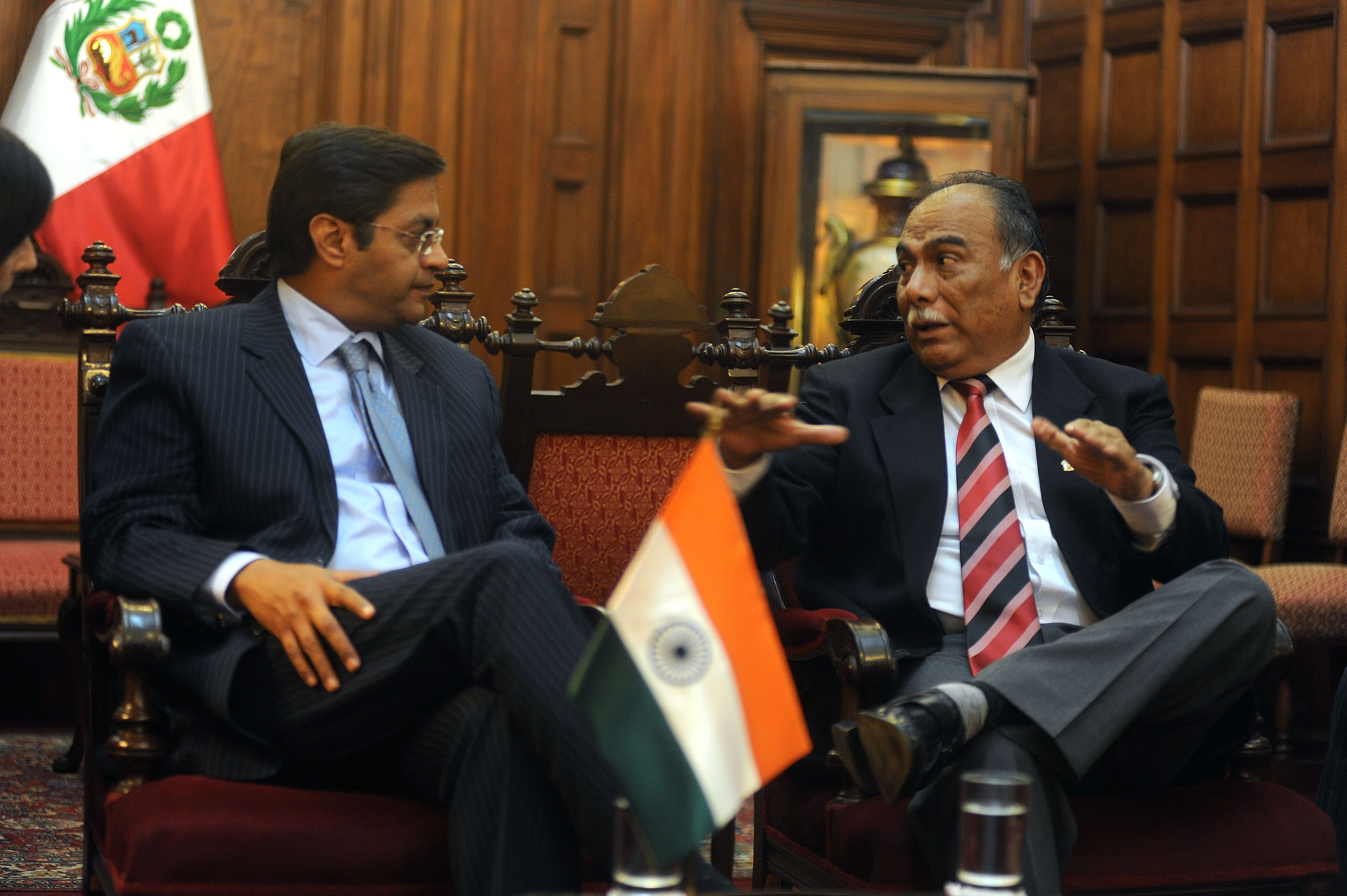
Manpreet Vohra (left) with Rogelio Canches Guzmán

Manpreet Vohra (born 28 December 1963) is a retired Indian diplomat of the Indian Foreign Service who served as the Indian High Commissioner to Australia from 2021 to 2023 and previously served as the Indian Ambassador to Mexico and Indian Ambassador to Afghanistan.

== Early life and education ==
He graduated with a BA in economics, and later obtained a Post-Graduate Diploma in International Trade, both from Panjab University.

== Career ==
He joined the Indian Foreign Service in 1988. After serving in various capacities at the Indian diplomatic missions in Hong Kong, China, Mongolia and United Kingdom, he was appointed as the Deputy High Commissioner to Kenya in 2005. In 2007, he was appointed the Deputy High Commissioner to Pakistan, where he served till 2009.

Between 2009 and 2011, he served in the project office to establish the South Asian University.

He served as the Indian Ambassador to Peru and Bolivia between 2011 and 2015. In 2015, he was appointed the Indian envoy to Afghanistan.

Between 2019 and 2021, he served as the Indian ambassador to Mexico, concurrently serving as the High Commissioner to Belize.

In 2021, he was appointed the Indian High Commissioner to Australia and served there till December 2023. He was succeeded by Gopal Baglay.

== Personal life ==
He is married to Naseem Vohra. They have two children, a daughter and a son.
