= Indian embassy =

Indian embassy may refer to:

- List of diplomatic missions of India
- List of diplomatic missions in India

== See also ==
- List of ambassadors and high commissioners of India
- List of ambassadors and high commissioners to India
- List of ambassadors of India
