= List of Ambassadors of India to Vietnam =

Head of mission of India to South Africa

Ambassador of India to Vietnam
- Emblem of India

- Flag of India
- Incumbent; Tshering W. Sherpa since September 2025
- Style: His Excellency
- Type: Ambassador
- Member of: Indian Foreign Service
- Reports to: Ministry of External Affairs
- Seat: Embassy of India, Hanoi
- Appointer: President of India
- Term length: No fixed tenure
- Website: Indian Ambassador to Vietnam

The ambassador of India to Vietnam is the chief diplomatic representative of India to Vietnam, housed in the Indian Embassy located at 58-60 Tran Hung Dao Street, Cua Nam Ward, Hanoi, Vietnam.

The embassy is headed by the Ambassador, while a Consulate located in Ho Chi Minh City is headed by a Consul.

== List of Indian ambassadors ==
The following people have served as Ambassadors to Vietnam.

S. No.	Name	Entered office	Left office
1	Sisir Gupta	December 1972	July 1975
2	C. R. Gharekhan	August 1975	January 1977
3	M. R. Sivaramakrishnan	February 1977	October 1979
4	G. Raj	November 1979	October 1981
5	Kuldip Sahdev	November 1981	January 1985
6	Pushkar Johari	January 1985	May 1988
7	A. B. Patwardhan	June 1988	December 1988
8	J. C. Sharma	March 1989	August 1992
9	S. L. Malik	August 1992	December 1996
10	Aftab Seth	January 1997	September 2000
11	Saurabh Kumar	October 2000	August 2003
12	N. Ravi	January 2004	January 2006
13	Lal T. Muana	December 2006	June 2010
14	Ranjit Rae	June 2010	August 2013
15	Preeti Saran	September 2013	February 2016
16	Parvathaneni Harish	April 2016	June 2019
17	Pranay Verma	July 2019	September 2022
18	Sandeep Arya	October 2022	September 2025
19	Tshering W. Sherpa	September 2025	Incumbent

== See also ==
- India–Vietnam relations
