= K. D. Sharma =

Indian politician

Indian ambassador to Pakistan
- In office 1982–1985
- Preceded by: K S Bajpai
- Succeeded by: S K Singh

Personal details
- Born: 6 September 1931 Pratapgarh, Uttar Pradesh
- Died: 15 April 2010 (aged 78)
- Occupation: Diplomat Civil servant IFS

Krishna Dayal Sharma (6 September 1931 – 15 April 2010) was an Indian ambassador to Pakistan. He also served as the Indian High Commissioner in Mauritius, Tanzania and Australia. His final ambassadorial role was as head of mission in Madrid, Spain, from 1985-to 89.

== Positions held ==
- 1970-1971 Head, West Asia & North Africa Division, Ministry of External Affairs.
- From August 1971 to August 1974 he was High Commissioner to Mauritius
- From September 1974 to July 1978 he was High Commissioner to Dar es Salaam. Tanzania
- From June 1980 to June 1982 he was High Commissioner to Canberra, Australia
- 1982-July 1985 Indian High Commissioner to Islamabad, Pakistan.
- July 1985 Ambassador to Madrid.
