= India–Peru relations =

- India: Peru

Diplomatic mission
- Embassy of India, Lima: Embassy of Peru, New Delhi

Envoy
- Ambassador Sandeep Chakravorty: Ambassador Javier Manuel Paulinich

India–Peru relations are the diplomatic and bilateral relations that exist between the Republic of India and the Republic of Peru. Both countries are members of the World Trade Organization and the United Nations.

== History ==
India and Peru established diplomatic relations on 26 March 1963, and the Indian embassy in Chile was jointly accredited to Peru. India opened its resident diplomatic mission in Lima in September 1969, and the first resident Ambassador to Peru assumed office in November 1973. Peru maintains an embassy in New Delhi, which is also accredited to Bangladesh, Iran, Maldives, Nepal and Sri Lanka. Economic relations between the two countries began to grow significantly in the 1990s, fueled by India's technological and economic growth and Peru's desire to increase its presence in Asia. Peru is a member of the Asia-Pacific Economic Cooperation (APEC). Indian interest in Peru increased as the latter witnessed fast economic growth and rapid industrialization, becoming one of the fastest growing countries in Latin America.

There have been several high level diplomatic visits between the nations. Peruvian President Alan Garcia was the chief guest at India's Republic Day celebrations in 1987. President Alberto Fujimori visited India in May 1997. Indian President K. R. Narayanan visited Peru in 1998.

The Congress of Peru reactivated the Peru-India Parliamentary Friendship League on 30 April 2003. The Parliament of India established an India-Peru Parliamentary Friendship Group in December 2007.

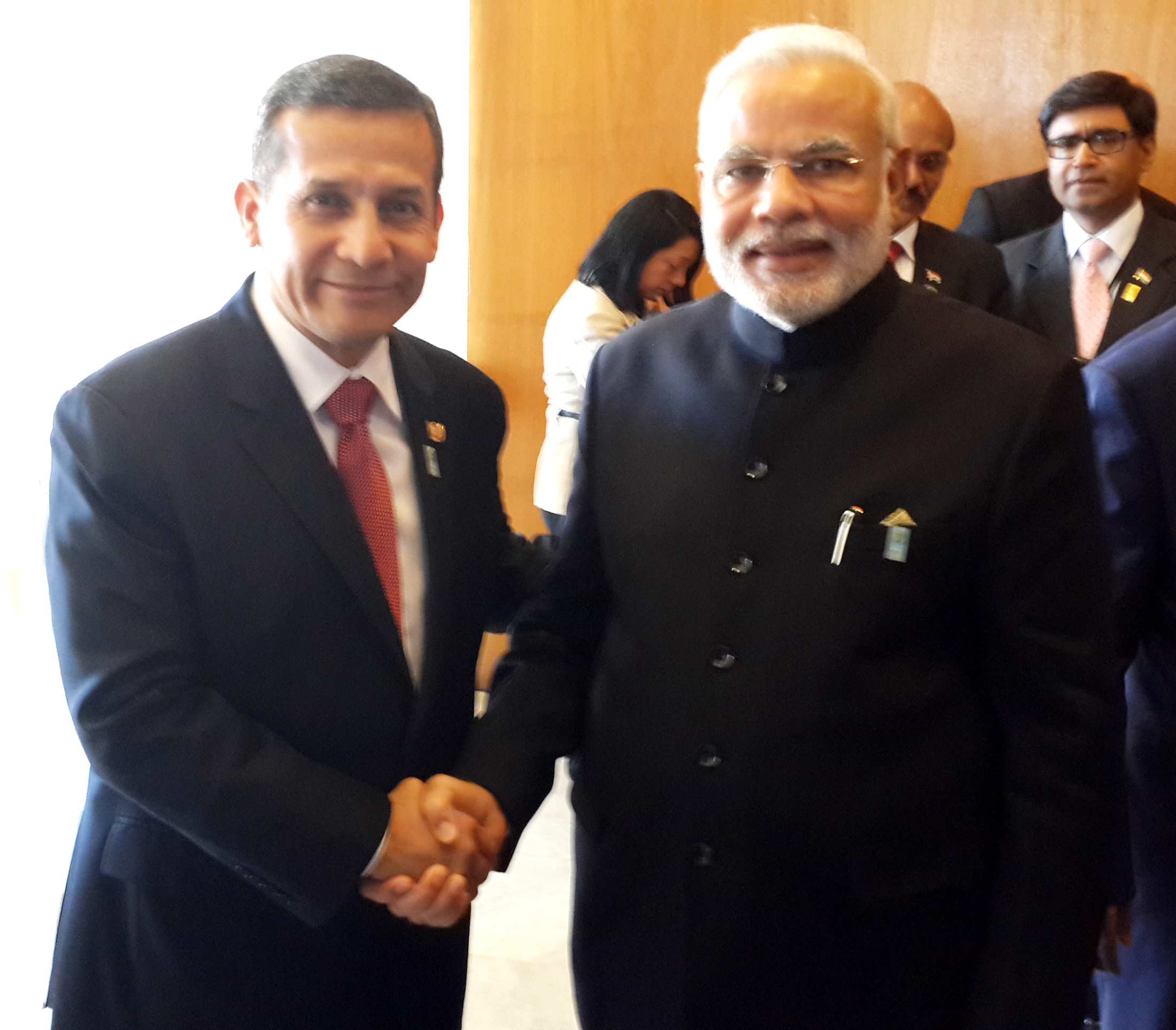
The Prime Minister, Shri Narendra Modi meeting the President of the Republic of Peru, Mr. Ollanta Humala, on the sidelines of the Sixth BRICS Summit, at Brasilia, in Brazil on July 16, 2014.

In October 2013, the two countries signed agreements on co-operation in education, culture and the establishment of a Joint Commission to promote bilateral relations.

Peru supports India's candidature for a permanent seat in the United Nations Security Council, and also supports India in the Kashmir dispute. The Peruvian Government "has traditionally shown understanding of the Indian position on Kashmir and has been sympathetic and appreciative of India's responsible restraint even in the face of grave provocation. Peru supports India's Position that such conflicts should be resolved bilaterally through dialogue and not be internationalized."

The two countries celebrated their 55 years of bilateral ties between them by the Vice President of India, Venkaiah Naidu visiting the country in May 2018. Peru is also interested in having a free trade agreement with the country with the third round of discussions planned for August 2018 where expansion of trade in pharmaceuticals and IT sector is being focused upon.

== Economic relations ==
=== Trade ===
Bilateral trade between India and Peru witnessed rapid growth in the late 2000s and early 2010s rising from US$250 million in 2007 to $3.126 billion by 2018–19. In 2012, bilateral trade between the two countries crossed the billion dollar mark for the first time, making Peru the seventh Latin American trade partner of India to achieve the milestone, after Brazil, Venezuela, Mexico, Chile, Colombia, and Argentina.

Bilateral trade between India and Peru recorded its highest increase of 76.95% in 2017–18, to US$3.137 billion, over the previous fiscal. In 2018-19 Indian exports to Peru stood at $721 million, while imports from Peru were $2.405 billion. The main commodities exported from India to Peru are towers of iron and steel, pipes for the oil and gas industry, automobiles, motorcycles and three-wheelers, iron and steel products, polyester and cotton yarns, and pharmaceuticals. The main commodities exported from Peru to India are copper, gold, phosphates of calcium, zinc and lead minerals, fish flour, synthetic cables, and grapes.

The two countries are currently negotiating a bilateral free trade agreement.

=== Investment ===
Several Indian companies have investments in Peru's mining sector including iron ore, manganese, phosphate and gold. IFFCO owns a major stake in large phosphate mine in northern Peru, Zuari Agro has a 30% stake (worth about $36 million) in a rock phosphate reserve in the same region. Reliance acquired an oil block in the country. Several Indian IT firms also operate in Peru. Tata Consultancy Services operates in Lima, and Tech Mahindra began operating in the country after it acquired Israeli company LeadCom.

Redbus acquired majority stake in Peruvian company Busportal.pe. All major Indian pharmaceutical companies have a representative office or local subsidiary in Peru.

Peruvian beverage manufacturer AJE Group opened an Indian subsidiary, AJE India Pvt. Ltd., in Maharashtra to manufacture soft beverages. The subsidiary began operation in December 2010, and invested $15 million in India by 2016. Machinery firm Resemen S.A.C. established a subsidiary in New Delhi called Reliant Drilling Ltd., after it was awarded a contract from Hindustan Zinc Ltd. Other Peruvian mining services firms such as Opermin and AAC Mining Executors Ltd. have also established operations in India. Lubricants manufacturer Vistony opened a plant near Rewari, Haryana.

== Defence relations ==
India and Peru signed an agreement on defence cooperation and prevention of proliferation of weapons of mass destruction in October 2013. The agreement will allow Peru to send its military personnel to India for training. India offered Peruvian defence officials slots at the Defence Services Staff College in Wellington, Kochi. The defence agreement also includes the sale of spare parts to the Peruvian military.

Peru sent a naval officer to attend the 53rd NDC Course in New Delhi in 2013.

== Indian foreign aid ==
India donated $500,000 towards disaster relief efforts in the aftermath of an earthquake in Peru on 15 August 2007. It has also provided funding for an afforestation program at a park named after Mahatma Gandhi in Lima.

Citizens of Peru are eligible for scholarships under the Indian Technical and Economic Cooperation Programme and the Indian Council for Cultural Relations. Many Peruvian diplomats have attended PCFD courses at the Foreign Service Institute in India.

== Cultural relations ==
India and Peru signed an agreement on cultural co-operation in 1987. The Indo-Peruvian Friendship Association (Hindi: Bharat-Maitreyi Samiti) was established in India in June 2007. It is a civil organization aimed at promoting friendship between the two countries, to exhibit Peruvian culture and the Spanish language in India, as well as to encourage cultural exchanges of professors and students of both countries.

Mundo Latino is a Latin American cultural center and a center of excellence affiliated to the Embassy of Peru in New Delhi. The center offers Spanish-language and salsa dancing courses in the Delhi NCR. It also teaches English and Hindi as foreign language courses.

== Indians in Peru ==
As of December 2016, 500 Indian citizens reside in Peru. The community is primarily involved in business and trade. A few work with the Missionaries of Charity and other Christian organizations in Lima, Chimbote, and Puno.

Organizations such as Hare Krishna, Sai Baba and Brahma Kumaris are also present in Peru.

== Peruvians in India ==
As of 2013, an estimated 200 Peruvians reside in India, most of whom are women. The community is primarily employed as professors, engineers, and students. They can be found in the Delhi NCR, Haryana, Maharashtra, Uttar Pradesh, Karnataka, and Rajasthan.

== See also ==
- List of ambassadors of Peru to India
- List of ambassadors of India to Peru
