= Kumar Tuhin =

Indian diplomat

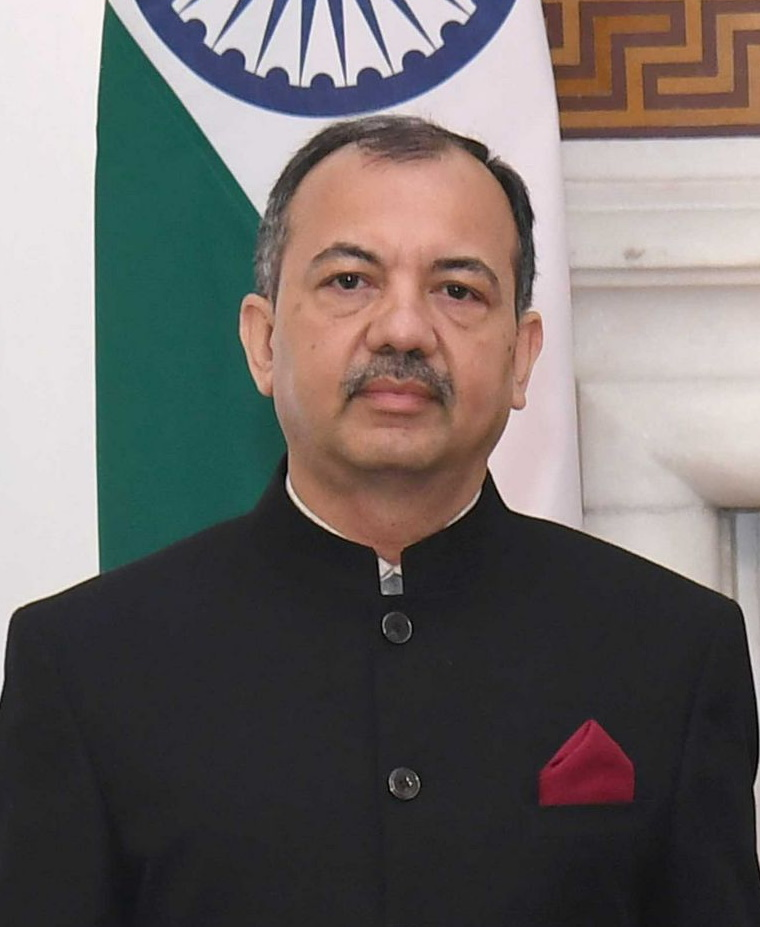

Ambassador of India to Netherlands
- Incumbent
- Assumed office 6 November 2024
- Preceded by: Reenat Sandhu

Director General of the Indian Council for Cultural Relations
- In office 20 December 2021 – 21 November 2024
- Preceded by: Dinesh K. Patnaik
- Succeeded by: Nandini K Singla

Ambassador of India to Hungary
- In office November 2018 – November 2021
- Preceded by: Rahul Chhabra
- Succeeded by: Partha Sathpaty

High Commissioner of India to Namibia
- In office July 2015 – October 2018
- Preceded by: S P Mann
- Succeeded by: Prashant Agrawal

Personal details
- Born: 8 June 1967 (age 59) Chapra, Bihar, India
- Spouse: Deepa
- Education: Netarhat Residential School; St. Xavier's College, Ranchi; Indian Railways Institute of Mechanical and Electrical Engineering
- Profession: Diplomat
- Website: https://www.kumartuhin.com

Kumar Tuhin (born 8 June 1967) is an Indian diplomat from the 1991 batch of the Indian Foreign Service who currently serves as Indian Ambassador to Netherlands. Before, this he served as Director General of the Indian Council for Cultural Relations (ICCR) and also served as an Indian Ambassador to Hungary and as Indian High Commissioner to Namibia. Before joining the Indian Foreign Service he worked in the Indian Railway Service of Mechanical Engineers.

== Education ==
Kumar Tuhin was born on 8 June 1967 in Bihar and received his early education at Braj Kishore Kinder Garten, Chhapra during 1976–1977. He was then admitted at Netarhat Residential School in 1978. From 1983 to 1985, he completed his high schooling at St. Xavier's College, Ranchi. He joined IIT Kanpur in 1985 to study Mechanical Engineering. He then studied at Indian Railways Institute of Mechanical and Electrical Engineering, where he was placed on the Roll of Honour for the year 1985. After graduating in 1990 he worked in the Indian Railway Service of Mechanical Engineers for few years.

== Career ==
After training at the Foreign Service Institute in New Delhi, he was allotted Chinese as his foreign language. He served in the Consulate General of India, Hong Kong (it was then called Commission of India, Hong Kong as it was still a UK territory) from 1993 to 1995, during which he obtained his advanced diploma from the Chinese University of Hong Kong. Thereafter, he served as Second Secretary /First Secretary at the Embassy of India, Beijing from 1995 to 1999.

He subsequently served at the Permanent Mission of India to the UN Offices in Geneva from 1999 to 2002 looking after, among others, specialized agencies of the United Nations. He served in the Indian Embassy in Hanoi from 2005 to 2009, and as Deputy Consul General at the Consulate General of India in San Francisco from 2009 to 2012. The Indian Consulate General in San Francisco then had a very large consular jurisdictional area, covering states up to Hawaii, Alaska and New Mexico.

=== High Commissioner to Namibia ===
Kumar Tuhin was appointed as the High Commissioner of India to Namibia on 23 June 2015. He completed his assignment in October 2018. During his tenure in Namibia, Mr. Tuhin laid the foundations for the establishment of a Centre of Excellence in Information Technology (CEIT) at the Namibia University of Science and Technology. During the visit of President of India to Namibia in 2016, Tuhin was the signatory from the Indian side of the MoU on cooperation between the Namibia Institute for Public Administration and Management, (NIPAM) and the Indian Institute of Management Ahmedabad. In Sep 2018, Mr. Tuhin was the signatory from the Indian side of the agreement between the NIPAM and the Lal Bahadur Shastri National Academy of Administration. India-Namibia economic relations received specific boost during his tenure.

=== Ambassador to Hungary ===
Tuhin was appointed as the Ambassador of India to Hungary on 26 September 2018. For his work in Hungary, Mr. Tuhin has indicated economic sectors as priority areas. During his stint in Hungary, political exchanges between India and Hungary strengthened with the visits of External Affairs Minister Dr. S. Jaishankar to Hungary from 25 to 27 August 2019 (which was Minister Jaishankar's first visit to Hungary after assuming office), of Minister of Jal Shakti Gajendra Singh Shekhawat to Hungary from 14 to 17 October 2019 and of Hungarian Foreign Minister Péter Szijjártó to India from 14 to 17 January 2020. The parent Indian company of Kischemicals in Sajóbábony decided in Nov 2020 to increase their investment by Euro 32 million. The 6th Indian Film Festival in Hungary was organized during Dec 2020-Jan 2021. The Indian Tourism Office participated in Utazas Travel Expo from February 27- March 1, 2020 and a number of Indian companies participated in Sirha Budapest 2020. In recognition of his contribution, the Department of Indian Studies of the Eötvös Loránd University (ELTE University), Budapest honoured Tuhin with "Amicus Facultatis" award on 10 May 2021. Tuhin completed his tenure in Hungary in Nov 2021 and returned to India to assume charge as the Director General of the Indian Council for Cultural Relations, an autonomous organization under the Ministry of External Affairs of India.

=== Ambassador to Bosnia and Herzegovina ===
On 14 May 2019, Kumar Tuhin was concurrently accredited as the Ambassador of India to Bosnia and Herzegovina. He presented his credentials to Mr. Želјko Komšić, Chairman of the Presidency of Bosnia and Herzegovina.

=== Operation Ganga in Hungary ===
Immediately after the start of the Russian invasion of Ukraine on 24 Feb 2022, the Govt of India launched Operation Ganga to evacuate stranded Indian students in Ukraine. Given Tuhin's previous experience in Hungary, he was deputed to lead the Operation Ganga in Hungary and he took charge in Budapest on 25 Feb 2022 itself. Over a span of two weeks, he successfully coordinated the complex task of evacuating more than 6000 Indian students from Ukraine through 32 special flights operating out of Budapest airport. Given the small border between Hungary and Ukraine, initially it was estimated that about 800-900 Indian students would cross through the Hungarian border, but because of border crossing difficulties at Ukraine-Romania and Ukraine -Poland borders, the number of students crossing through the Hungarian border surged manifold and almost one third of the total 22500 students were evacuated through Operation Ganga in Hungary.

== Other details ==
In the Ministry of External Affairs (India), he has served in various capacities including as Joint Secretary to the Government of India in-charge of Development Partnership Administration from 2012 to 2015. His responsibilities included the capacity building programmes of the government of India, including the flagship Indian Technical and Economic Cooperation (ITEC) scheme as well as setting up of Centres of Excellence in IT and Vocational Training Centres as also implementation of grant projects in some regions of the world.

Mr. Tuhin has attended a leadership programme at the Near East South Asia Center for Strategic Studies at the National Defence University in USA.

He speaks Hindi, English, Chinese and French.

== Publication ==
Tuhin has published an article entitled “India's development cooperation through capacity building” in the book “India's Approach to Development Cooperation” published by Routledge, 2016.
