= Dinesh K. Patnaik =

High Commissioner of India to Canada

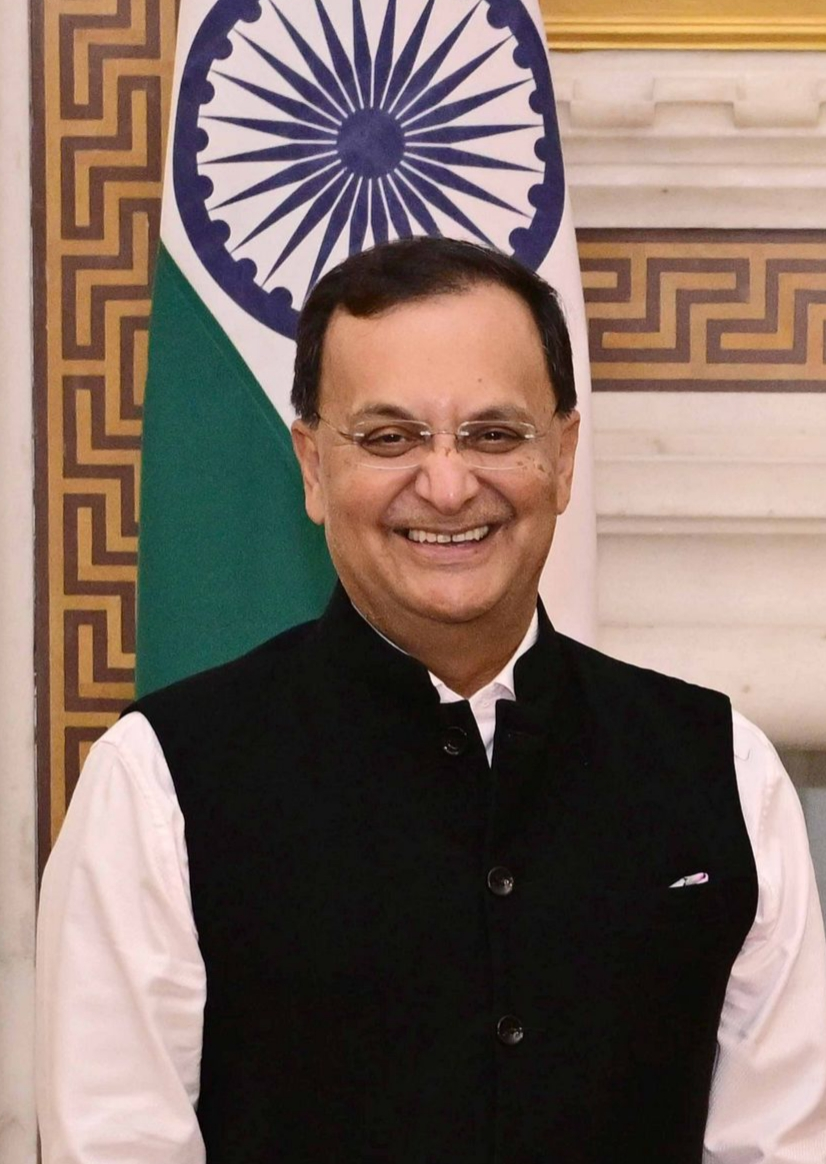

High Commissioner of India to Canada
- Incumbent
- Assumed office 28 August 2025
- Preceded by: Sanjay Kumar Verma

Director General, Indian Council for Cultural Relations
- In office 04 February 2020 – 19 December 2021
- Succeeded by: Kumar Tuhin

Additional Secretary (CPV&OIA) in MEA
- In office 15 July 2019 – 02 February 2020
- Appointed by: Appointments Committee of the Cabinet

Ambassador of India to Morocco
- In office 22 September 2015 – 22 August 2016
- Preceded by: Krishan Kumar
- Succeeded by: Dr Kheya Bhattacharya

Ambassador of India to Cambodia
- In office 10 September 2012 – 01 August 2015
- Succeeded by: Naveen Srivastava

Personal details
- Born: 3 January 1967 (age 59) India
- Spouse: Poonam Patnaik
- Children: 2
- Education: Delhi University; IIM Calcutta; University of Vienna
- Profession: Diplomat

Dinesh K. Patnaik (3 January 1967) is an Indian diplomat from 1990 batch of the Indian Foreign Service who is currently serving as the High Commissioner of India to Canada since August 2025. He previously served as the Indian Ambassador to Spain, Morocco and Cambodia.

== Education ==
Dinesh Patnaik studied at Delhi University where he completed his Master of Science in Physics and his MBA from IIM Calcutta and his Master in Advanced Studies from the University of Vienna.

== Civil Service Career ==
Patnaik served as India's Ambassador to Cambodia from September 2012 to August 2015, then to Morocco between September 2015 and August 2016. He then worked as Deputy High Commissioner of India in the United Kingdom between November 2018 and July 2019. He was additional secretary for the Ministry of External Affairs' Indian Ocean Region (IOR) division; Consular, Passport and Visa (CPV) division; and Overseas Indian Affairs (OIA) division from November 2018 to February 2020, when he was appointed as the Director General of the Indian Council for Cultural Relations (ICCR). He became Ambassador of India to Spain in December 2021.

Patnaik spoke at the Jaipur Literature Festival in at the British Library in London in 2021.

== Personal life ==
Patnaik and his wife Poonam have two daughters.
