= Saurabh Kumar (ambassador) =

Indian diplomat (born 1966)

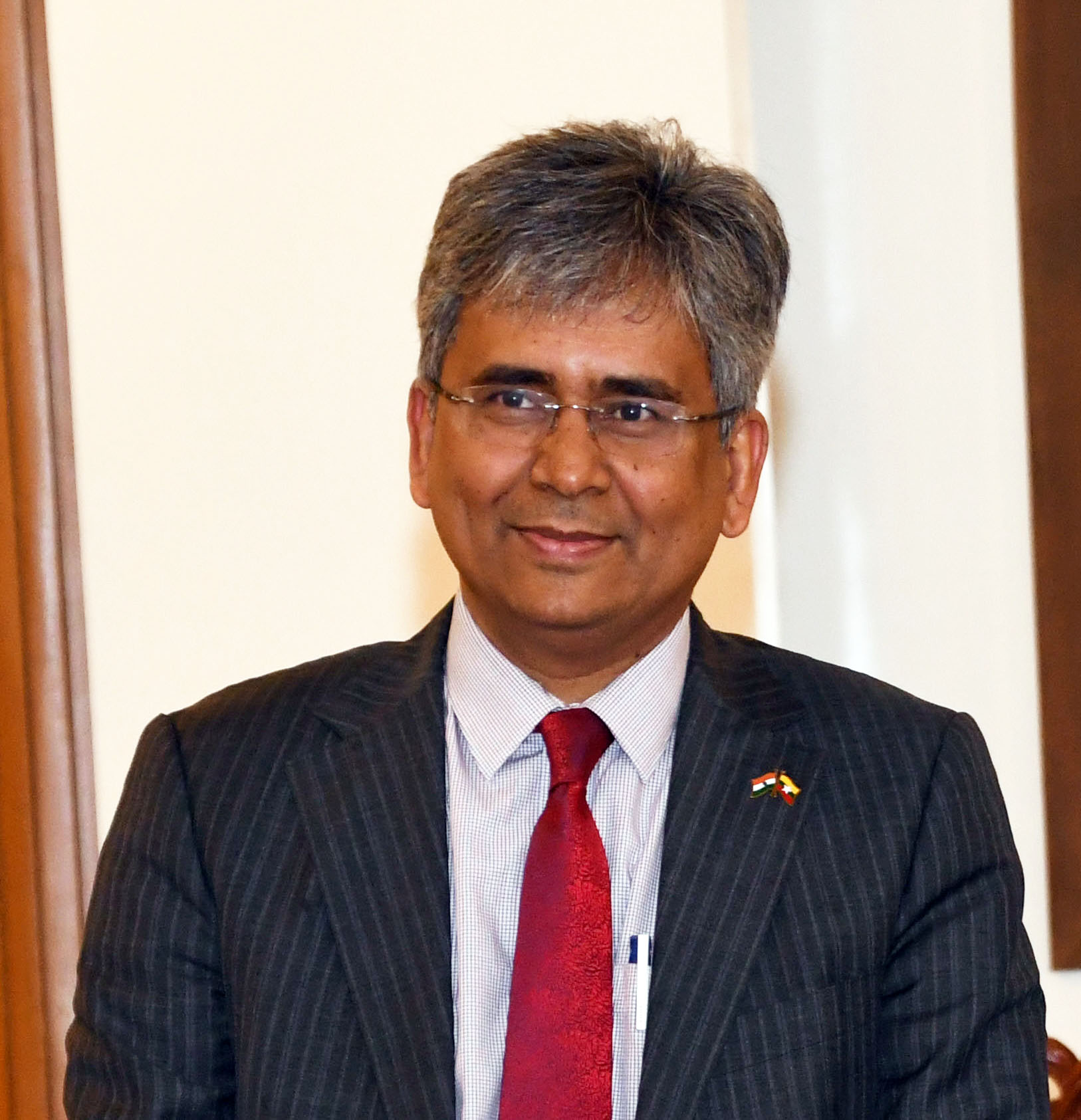

Indian Ambassador to European Union
- Incumbent
- Assumed office 1 March 2024
- Prime Minister: Narendra Modi
- Preceded by: Santosh Jha
- Succeeded by: Pranay Kumar Verma

Secretary (East) Ministry of External Affairs
- In office 18 November 2021 – 29 February 2024
- Preceded by: Riva Ganguly Das
- Succeeded by: Jaideep Mazumdar

Ambassador of India to Myanmar
- In office 21 January 2019 – 17 November 2021
- Preceded by: Vikram Misri
- Succeeded by: Vinay Kumar

Ambassador of India to the Islamic Republic of Iran
- In office 25 August 2015 – 24 December 2018
- Preceded by: D. P. Srivastava
- Succeeded by: Gaddam Dharmendra

Personal details
- Born: 1 January 1966 (age 60) Lucknow
- Education: IIT Kanpur; IIT Delhi
- Occupation: Civil servant IFS
- Profession: diplomat

Saurabh Kumar (born 1 January 1966) is an Indian diplomat currently serving as Ambassador of India to European Union, Belgium and Luxembourg. Before this assignment he was Secretary (East) in the Ministry of External Affairs, Government of India. He also served as Ambassador of India to Myanmar and to the Islamic Republic of Iran.

== Early life and education ==
Saurabh Kumar was born on 1 January 1966 in Lucknow, India. He completed his schooling from La Martinière College, Lucknow. An engineer by training, he obtained his B.Tech. from the Indian Institute of Technology Kanpur and M.Tech. from Indian Institute of Technology Delhi.

== Career ==
Upon completing his education, he joined the Indian Foreign Service in 1989. His first post was to the Commission of India in Hong Kong in 1991.

Between 1993 and 1998 he served as an Under Secretary in the Ministry of External Affairs in New Delhi looking after China and Pakistan. He subsequently returned as Director of the China Desk in 2004 following stints as First Secretary in Indonesia (1998-2001) and Fiji (2001-2004). He became Deputy Chief of Mission to the Embassy of India in Beijing, China in 2007 and later became the Deputy Chief of Mission/chargé d'affaires to the Embassy of India in Rome, Italy between 2008 and 2012.

In 2012 he returned to New Delhi as Joint Secretary dealing with counter terrorism, policy planning, and research and subsequently joined the National Security Council Secretariat.

In 2015 he was appointed Ambassador of India to the Islamic Republic of Iran, a position he held until he assumed his role of Ambassador of India to Myanmar in early 2019 and served the office till 17 November 2021. Thereafter, he served as Secretary (East) Ministry of External Affairs from December 2021 to February 2024. Currently, he is serving as ambassador of India to European Union.

== Personal life ==
He is married to Smriti Srivastav and has two daughters, Sugandha and Sanjana. He is fluent in English, Hindi, and has knowledge of Mandarin Chinese.
