= India–Romania relations =

- India: Romania

Diplomatic mission
- Embassy of Romania, New Delhi: Embassy of India, Bucharest

Envoy
- Ambassador Daniela-Mariana Sezonov Tane: Ambassador Rahul Shrivastava

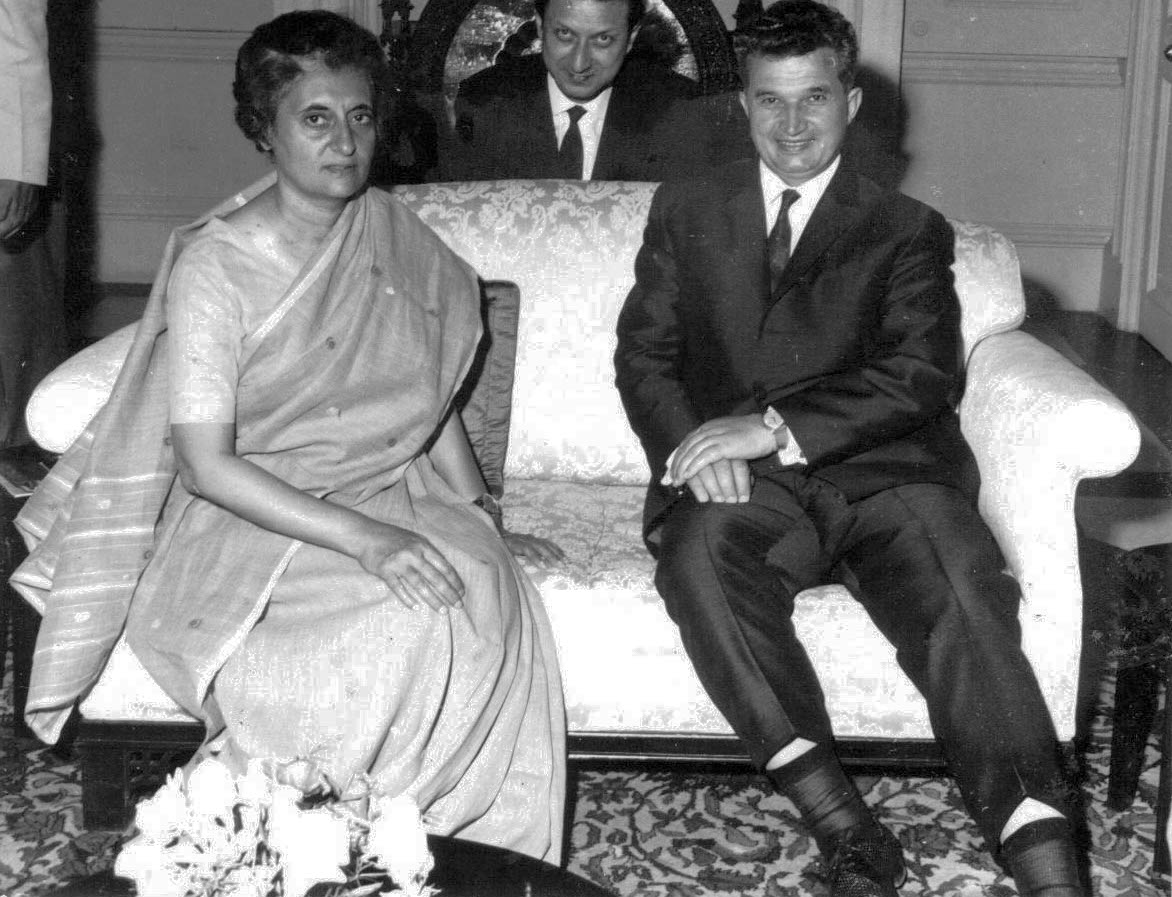
Indira Gandhi meeting Nicolae Ceaușescu in New Delhi; 1969.

India and Romania maintain international and cordial relations.

== Early history ==
Romania and India were briefly connected by Alexander the Great's empire in 326 BC.

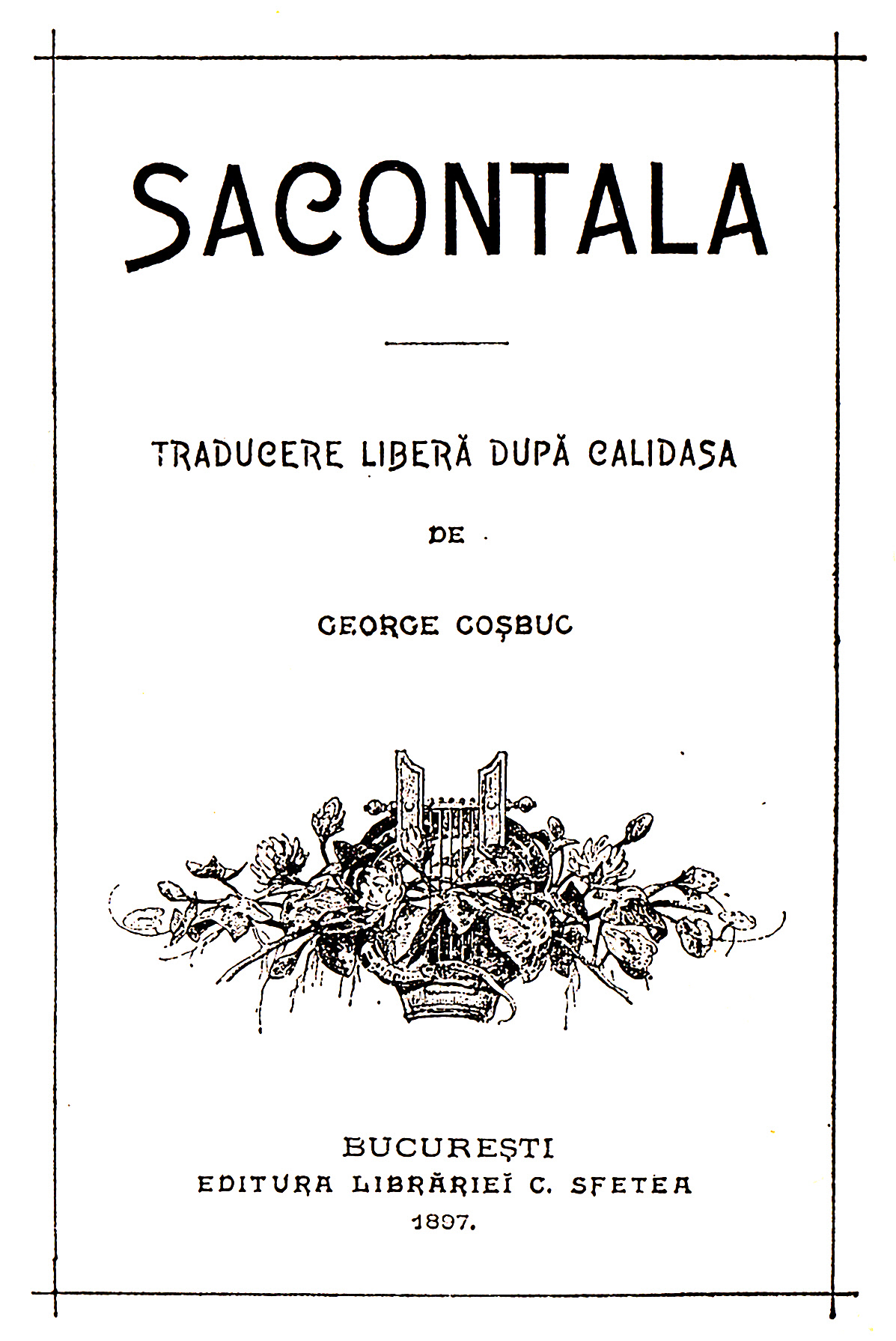
George Coșbuc's adaptation of Abhijñānaśākuntalam, published in 1897

Direct contact between India and Romania dates back a few centuries.

== Modern history ==
Diplomatic relations between India and Romania were established on 14 December 1948 at the legacy level, and were upgraded to embassy level in 1957. Romania opened an embassy in New Delhi in 1955, and India opened an embassy in Bucharest in 1957. The Romanian Prime Minister visited India in March 1958. Today, Romania also has honorary consulates in Chennai and Kolkata, and India has an honorary consulate in Timișoara.

In 2024, India released commemorative postal stamps to celebrate its relations with Romania.

== Economic relations ==
The Indian and Romanian governments discussed the terms of a proposed a refinery project in Assam in mid-1958.

Bilateral trade between the two countries was US$727.27 million in 2011–12. India exported $269.54 million to, and imported $457.73 million, worth of goods from Romania. Bilateral trade totaled $713 million in 2013.

Several Indian firms such as Ranbaxy, Gujarat Heavy Chemicals (GHCL), WIPRO, Genpact and Raymonds have a presence in Romania.

== Indians in Romania ==
As of July 2013, around 950 Indian citizens resided in Romania.

== See also ==
- Foreign relations of India
- Foreign relations of Romania
- Ambassador of India to Romania
- Romani people in Romania
