= Chandrashekhar Dasgupta =

Indian politician (1940–2023)

- Born: 2 May 1940; Calcutta, Bengal Presidency, British India
- Died: 2 March 2023 (aged 82)
- Occupations: Diplomat; Civil servant
- Known for: Indian Foreign Service
- Awards: Padma Bhushan

Chandrashekhar Dasgupta (2 May 1940 – 2 March 2023) was an Indian civil servant, diplomat and writer who served as Indian ambassador to the European Union, Bangladesh, Belgium, Luxembourg and China.

== Early life ==
Dasgupta was born on 2 May 1940, He graduated with honours in Economics from the Delhi University.

== Career ==
Dasgupta entered Indian Foreign Service in 1962 and worked as a diplomat till his superannuation in 2000. During this period, he served as the Indian ambassador to China (1993–1996) and Belgium and Luxemburg and the European Union (1996–2000). Prior to his postings as an ambassador, he was the high commissioner to Singapore (1981–84) and Tanzania (1984–86) and held the vice-chair of the preparatory committees of United Nations Framework Convention on Climate Change (UNFCCC) and the United Nations Conference on Environment and Development (UNCED), popularly known as the Earth Summit, held in Rio de Janeiro in 1992.

Dasgupta, a distinguished fellow of The Energy and Resources Institute (TERI), delivered several keynote addresses on Climate and Climate policies. He was a member of the United Nations Committee on Economic, Social and Cultural Rights and was a former chairperson of the China Task Force. He served as the co-chairman of the EU-India Round Table and presented one of the key reports at the 12th EU-India Round Table held at Paris in July 2008. He sat in the International Covenant on Economic, Social and Cultural Rights from January 2007 to December 2010 and was a member of the Prime Minister's Council on Climate Change.

== Death ==
Dasgupta died on 2 March 2023, at the age of 82.

== Works ==
- C. Dasgupta (19 March 2002). War and Diplomacy in Kashmir,1947-48. SAGE Publications India. ISBN 978-0-7619-9588-3.

While on his assignment with the European Union in Brussels, Dasgupta made frequent visits to London to consult the British archives at the India Office Library. The information from the archives forms the core of the material in War and Diplomacy in Kashmir, 1947-48, which covers the onset of the Kashmir conflict in October 1947 and the conduct of Indo-Pakistani War of 1947 along with the diplomatic developments in which Britain played a central role. Most of the book is about British strategies which showed a decided tilt towards Pakistan in the Kashmir dispute, earning the British the epithet Perfidious Albion in the Indian public discourse.

The book was received in India with much acclaim, and was republished in 2014 as a "SAGE classic". Dasgupta's conclusions were broadly confirmed by Rakesh Ankit in 2013, based on the newer Dominion Office material made available in 2008–2009.

== Awards ==
The Government of India awarded him the third highest civilian honour of the Padma Bhushan, in 2008, for his contributions to Indian civil service.

Diplomatic posts
Preceded by (-)	High Commissioner of India to Singapore; 1981–1984	Succeeded by (-)
Preceded by P. M. S. Malik	High Commissioner of India to Tanzania; 1984–1986	Succeeded by H. D. Bhalla
Preceded by Salman Haidar	Ambassador of India to China; 1993–1996	Succeeded by Vijay K. Nambiar
Preceded by A. N. Ram	Ambassador of India to Belgium, Luxembourg and the European Union; 1996–2000	Succeeded by P. K. Singh
