= List of ambassadors of India to Morocco =

Head of mission of India to Morocco

Ambassador of India to Morocco
- Emblem of India

- Flag of India
- Incumbent; Sanjay Rana since 27 December 2024
- Style: His Excellency
- Type: Ambassador
- Member of: Indian Foreign Service
- Reports to: Ministry of External Affairs
- Seat: Embassy of India, Rabat
- Appointer: President of India
- Term length: No fixed tenure
- Website: indianembassyrabat.gov.in

The ambassador of India to Morocco is the chief diplomatic representative of India to Morocco, housed in the Indian Embassy located at 88, Rue Ouled Tidrarine (corner of Rue Laroussaine), Souissi, Rabat, Kingdom of Morocco.

The embassy is headed by the Ambassador.

== List of Indian Ambassadors ==
The following people have served as Ambassadors to Morocco.

S. No.	Name	Entered office	Left office
1	R. G. Rajwade, Cd'A	16 September 1957	24 November 1958
2	R. Goburdhun	1 December 1958	13 March 1962
3	B. K. Acharya	2 May 1962	11 July 1964
4	Y. K. Puri	14 August 1964	9 October 1967
5	M. Rasgotra	13 October 1967	7 March 1969
6	Gurbachan Singh	30 March 1969	27 September 1970
7	V. M. M. Nair	23 October 1970	15 December 1974
8	P. K. Guha	17 December 1974	11 October 1977
9	U. C. Soni	17 November 1977	31 March 1981
10	O. N. Sheopuri	11 June 1981	31 March 1983
11	S. N. Puri	16 June 1983	23 October 1985
12	R. K. Anand	17 April 1989	31 January 1991
13	Shiv Kumar	21 April 21 1991	31 December 1993
14	G. S. Iyer	18 February 1994	14 December 1998
15	I. S. Rathore	22 December 1998	30 November 2001
16	R. Rajagopalan	30 December 2001	29 February 2004
17	Prabhu Dayal	12 July 2004	24 August 2008
18	Brij B. Tyagi	27 December 2008	23 March 2012
19	Krishan Kumar	28 June 2012	13 September 2015
20	Dinesh K. Patnaik	22 September 2015	22 August 2016
21	Kheya Bhattacharya	15 November 2016	28 February 2019
22	Shambhu S. Kumaran	19 June 2019	29 July 2020
23	Rajesh Vaishnaw	12 April 2021	20 December 2024
24	Sanjay Rana	27 December 2024	Incumbent
