= Rahul Shrivastava =

High Commissioner of India to Namibia

His Excellency Rahul Shrivastava IFS
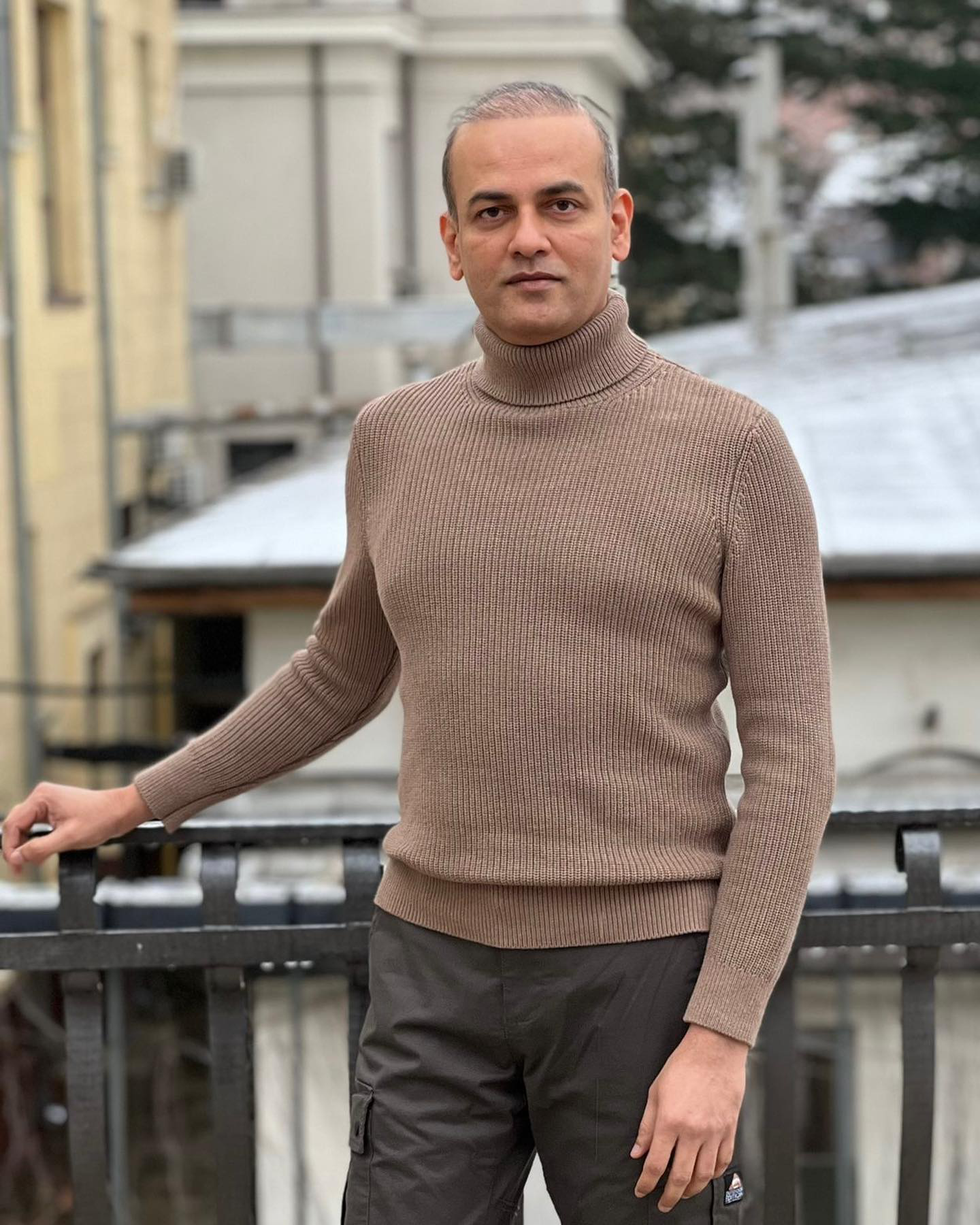
- Rahul Shrivastava in 2022

High Commissioner of India to Namibia
- Incumbent
- Assumed office November 2024
- President: Droupadi Murmu
- Prime Minister: Narendra Modi
- Preceded by: Mandarapu Subbarayudu

Ambassador of India to Romania
- In office July 2020 – October 2024
- President: Ram Nath Kovind; Droupadi Murmu
- Prime Minister: Narendra Modi
- Preceded by: Thanglura Darlong
- Succeeded by: Manika Jain

Ambassador of India to Venezuela
- In office July 2015 – March 2018
- President: Pranab Mukherjee; Ram Nath Kovind
- Prime Minister: Narendra Modi

Personal details
- Born: Rahul Shrivastava; 30 January 1975 (age 51) Chhattisgarh, India
- Spouse: Elena Shrivastava
- Children: 2
- Education: Ravenshaw University (B.Sc); NIT Rourkela (MCA); Annamalai University (M.A.)
- Occupation: Civil servant; diplomat; author
- Rank: Joint Secretary

Rahul Shrivastava is an Indian diplomat from the 1999 batch of the Indian Foreign Service who is currently serving as the High Commissioner of India to Namibia. He previously served as the Ambassador of India to Romania, Albania, Moldova and Venezuela.

== Early life and education ==
Shrivastava was born on 30 January 1975 in the state of Chhattisgarh, India. He spent his early years in Odisha. He did his schooling from St. Mary's Convent School, Biramitrapur and St. Mary's School, Barbil. Shrivastava holds a B.Sc in Chemistry from Ravenshaw University. He later completed his MCA from NIT Rourkela (formerly known as REC Rourkela) in 1999. He subsequently cleared the UPSC CSE exam in 1998, securing an All India Rank of 24. Shrivastava also holds a Master's degree in International Relations from Annamalai University.

== Diplomatic career ==
Shrivastava joined the Indian Foreign Service (IFS) in 1999. After completing the foundation course at the LBSNAA and the professional course at the FSI in 2000, he was posted to Moscow, Russia as a Third Secretary at the Embassy of India, Moscow. During his tenure, he studied the Russian language at Moscow State University.

In 2004, he was promoted to the position of Second Secretary and Representative of India in Nur-Sultan, Kazakhstan. From 2006 to 2007, he served as First Secretary and Chargé d'Affaires at the Embassy of India in Almaty, Kazakhstan.

In 2007, Shrivastava returned to the Ministry of External Affairs, India (MEA) in New Delhi, where he served as Under-Secretary and Deputy Secretary in the Eurasia Division. He was the Desk Officer dealing with Russia. He also handled BRICS and RIC (Russia-India-China) cooperation.

From 2009 to 2013, he served as First Secretary and then as Counsellor at the High Commission of India in London, United Kingdom. His task at High Commission of India included dealing with the Commonwealth of Nations.

After his tenure in London, he was reassigned to Moscow, where he worked in the Political Wing and then in the Press, Information and Culture Wing at the Embassy of India, Moscow.

From 2018 to 2020 he served as the Joint Secretary in the MEA. He was posted in Sushma Swaraj Institute of Foreign Service where his work primarily involved training of foreign diplomats at the Institute.

=== Ambassador to Venezuela ===
In July 2015, Shrivastava was appointed as the Ambassador of India to Venezuela, becoming the youngest Ambassador of India at the age of 40.

=== Ambassador to Romania, Moldova & Albania ===
In July 2020, Shrivastava was appointed as the Ambassador of India to Romania, Moldova and Albania.

During the Russia-Ukraine conflict of 2022, under Operation Ganga, over 8000 Indians were evacuated through Romania.

=== High Commissioner to Namibia ===
In November 2024, Shrivastava was appointed as the High Commissioner of India to Namibia. During his tenure, India conducted a historic state visit to Namibia on 9 July 2025, when Prime Minister Narendra Modi arrived in Windhoek as the final stop of his five‑nation tour. The visit strengthened bilateral ties through talks with Namibian leadership on sectors such as diamonds, critical minerals, and uranium, engagement with the Indian diaspora, and reaffirmation of the countries’ longstanding relationship.

== Personal life ==
Rahul Shrivastava is married to Elena. They have two children. He is the author of eight books.

== See also ==
- India–Russia relations
- Indian Foreign Service
- List of diplomatic missions of India
- List of ambassadors and high commissioners of India
