= Cambodia–India relations =

- India: Cambodia

Diplomatic mission
- Embassy of India, Phnom Penh: Royal Embassy of Cambodia, New Delhi

Envoy
- Ambassador B. Vanlalvawna: Ambassador Ung Sean

Cambodia–India relations (Khmer: ទំនាក់ទំនងកម្ពុជា-ឥណ្ឌា) (Hindi: केमबोडिया-भारत सम्बन्ध), also known as Cambodian-Indian relations or Indo-Cambodian relations, are the bilateral relations between the Kingdom of Cambodia and the Republic of India. Cambodia has an embassy in New Delhi, and India has an embassy in Phnom Penh.

== History ==
Relations between Cambodia and India date back to ancient times. Ancient India profoundly influenced Cambodia, through a process called Indianisation, which was a voluntary and peaceful adoption of Indian culture, religion, and customs. Indianisation occurred in Cambodia as early as in the Funan period, but became more pronounced during the Khmer Empire, who actively adopted Indian ideas. A significant portion of Khmer kings adopted Sanskrit names and titles, and used Sanskrit as the official administrative and court language, while the common people spoke Old Khmer, which was also heavily influenced by Sanskrit. Shaivism, introduced by Indian merchants and priests, was present since the Funan period but became the dominant religion for over a millennium, deeply influencing politics and the culture of Khmer Empire. Khmer kings built a large numbers of temples dedicated to deity Shiva. Khmer kings actively invited Indian Brahmins and specialised priests for daily rituals, and statecraft, introducing Indian mathematics, astronomy and science, which were necessary for the precise alignment of temples, geometrically, and cosmically. Later, King Suryavarman II adopted Vaishnavism, and oversaw the construction of Angkor Wat, the largest religious monument in the world. The Khmer script, used to write the Khmer language, is a direct descendent of the Pallava script from present-day South India. Khmer language has also borrowed a significant of words from Sanskrit, many of which are used in daily conversations.

The Khmers maintained extensive and cordial diplomatic relations with Indian dynasties such as the Cholas. There was a Chola-Khmer alliance against Srivijaya and Tambralinga. Khmer kings also adopted Indian ideas of kingship, with titles such as chakravartin (universal ruler) and devaraja (god-king).

The study "Indian Genetic Heritage in Southeast Asian Populations" (PLOS Genetics, 2022) reveals that present-day Cambodians, particularly the Khmer, possess around 9–12% South Asian (Indian) genetic ancestry, primarily from groups such as Irula, Mala, and Bengali. This admixture likely occurred between 770 and 3300 years ago, aligning with the Angkorian period, when Indianized states like Funan flourished in Cambodia. Genetic methods such as ADMIXTURE, qpAdm, and SOURCEFIND confirm this ancestry and indicate that the spread of Indian culture in Cambodia involved actual migration and intermarriage, not just trade or cultural diffusion. Other evidences are from the 3rd to 5th century BCE, the fossils of humans from that period show 45-50% ancestry from East Indians like Bihar and Bengal.

The findings also support legends like that of Kaudinya, the Indian Brahmin who co-founded Funan, and highlight multiple waves of Indian migration shaping Cambodia's genetic landscape. Ancient DNA analysis of a Protohistoric Cambodian individual (1st-3rd centuries CE) revealed a significant South Asian genetic admixture (42-49%), primarily linked to Southern Indian populations, indicating much earlier genetic exchange than previously thought. This contrasts with the lower South Asian ancestry seen in present-day Cambodians (9-15%), and suggests that South Asians admixed with local populations around the time of the early Funan state, potentially influencing the region's cultural development.

Both nations are part of the Non-Aligned Movement. India established formal diplomatic relations with the People's Republic of Kampuchea and opened its embassy in Phnom Penh in 1981 when Cambodia was internationally isolated. India had provided various personnel to conduct the country's UNTAC-sponsored elections in 1993. The Government of India agreed to preserve Angkor Wat temple when the Government of Cambodia appealed, between 1986 and 1993 and spent around 4 million dollars during this conservation.

While Cambodia has historically aligned itself more with the People's Republic of China, India's greatest geopolitical rival, Theravāda Buddhism is the country's state religion, practiced by around 95% of the population, and its intrinsic Indian culture has considerably impacted the society and culture.

== State visits ==
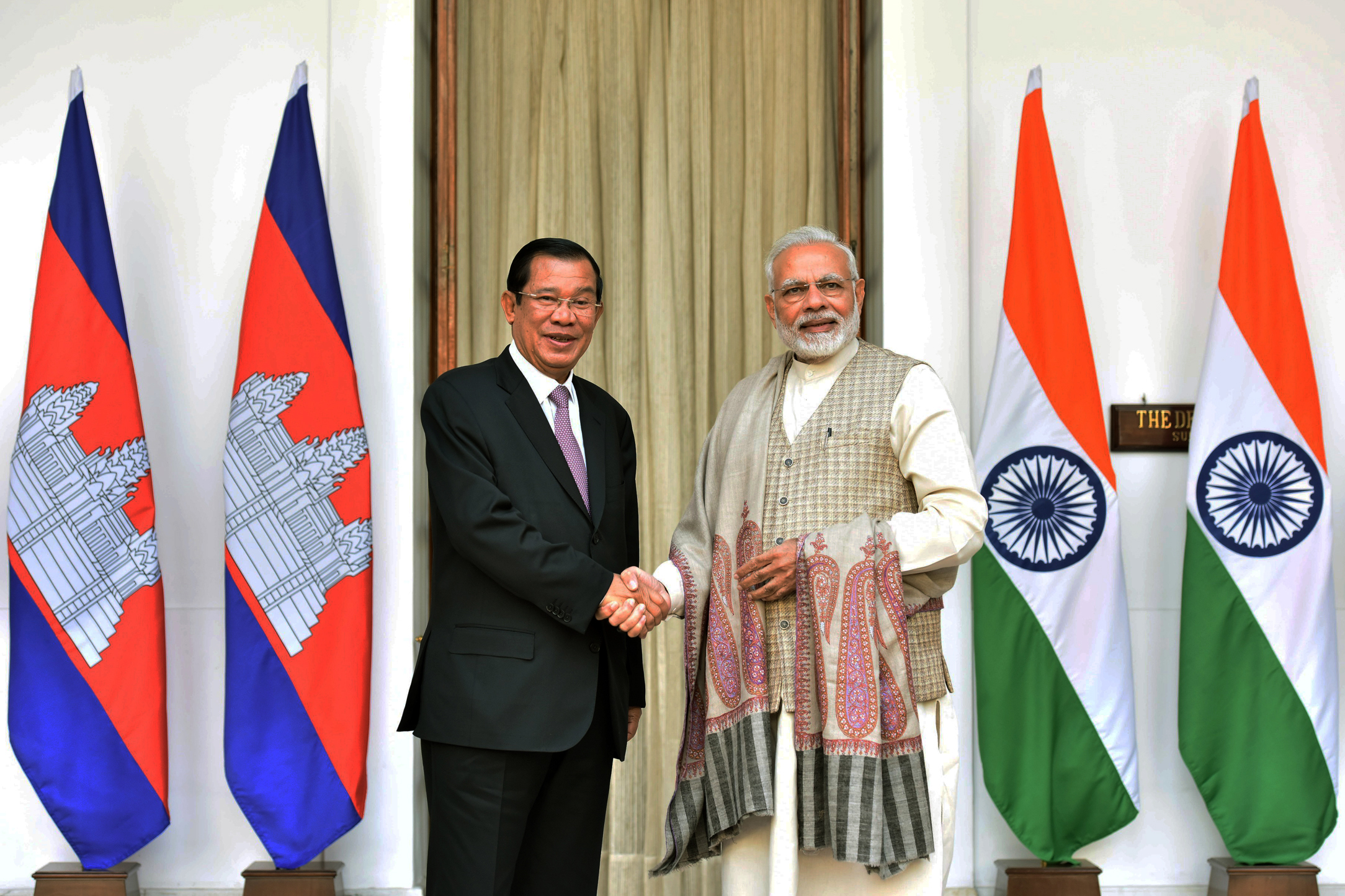
Cambodian prime minister Hun Sen meets with Indian prime minister Narendra Modi in New Delhi, 27 January 2018.

During her official state visit to Cambodia in 2010, Pratibha Patil, the President of India at that time, asked the local Indian community to serve as a link between the two nations. She encouraged the diaspora to use their skills, knowledge, and resources for the development of their country of origin. She went on to say, "While human resource development and capacity building have been the primary focus of our bilateral relations, India is extremely happy to cooperate with Cambodia in infrastructural projects, as well as in projects related to conservation and preservation of historical monuments."

Prime Minister Samdech Hun Sen visited India in January 2018. The two countries signed four key agreement to enhance bilateral cooperation during the visit. The agreements include an MoU on the prevention of human trafficking, a mutual legal assistance treaty in criminal matters, a cultural exchange programme, and a $36.92 million line of credit from India to help develop the Stung Sva Hab water resource development project. India and Cambodia also agreed on facilitating exchanges between senior-level defence personnel and capacity-building projects, and also jointly endorsed the UN Convention on the Law of the Sea (UNCLOS).

== Indian diaspora in Cambodia ==
The first Indians in modern times to settle in Cambodia arrived in the 1960s and 1970s. Primarily coming from the northern province of Punjab, they worked as jewellers, moneylenders and traders around Central Market, but they left the country once the Khmer Rouge arrived. The Indians returned to Cambodia when Pol Pot's regime collapsed.

There is an Indian diaspora in Cambodia and they have established an Indian Association, Cambodia.
