= Pranay Kumar Verma =

Indian diplomat and former High Commissioner of India to Bangladesh

His Excellency Pranay Kumar Verma IFS
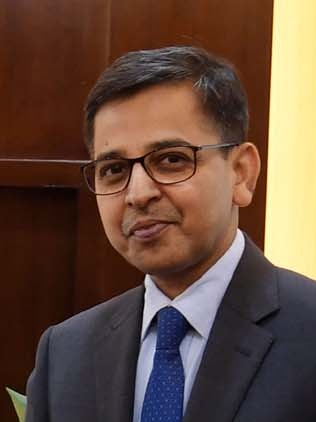
- Pranay in 2024

Ambassador of India to Belgium and the European Union
- Incumbent
- Assumed office 10 April 2026
- Preceded by: Saurabh Kumar

High Commissioner of India to Bangladesh
- In office 22 October 2022 – 9 April 2026
- Preceded by: Vikram Doraiswami
- Succeeded by: Dinesh Trivedi

Ambassador of India to Vietnam
- In office 25 July 2019 – 29 July 2022
- Preceded by: Parvathaneni Harish
- Succeeded by: Sandeep Arya

Personal details
- Occupation: Indian Foreign Service

Pranay Kumar Verma is the Ambassador of India to Belgium and the European Union. He is the former High Commissioner of India to Bangladesh and Ambassador of India to Vietnam.

== Early life ==
Verma received his Bachelor's degree in Mechanical engineering. He briefly worked at Tata Steel. Verma later received his Master's degree in Chinese language from the Middlebury Institute of International Studies at Monterey.

== Diplomatic Career ==
Verma joined the Indian Foreign Service in 1994.

On 25 July 2019, Verma was appointed the Ambassador of India to Vietnam. He was the previous Director General (DG) of the East Asia Division at the Ministry of External Affairs. In April 2026, he appointed as Ambassador of India to European Union, Belgium and Luxembourg.

=== High Commissioner to Bangladesh ===
Verma was appointed High Commissioner of India to Bangladesh on 29 July 2022. He replaced Vikram Doraiswami. He presented his credentials to President Mohammad Abdul Hamid on 28 October 2022.

During his tenure, the July Uprising occurred in Bangladesh, resulting in the overthrow of the government of Sheikh Hasina. Subsequently, under the interim advisory of Muhammad Yunus, India-Bangladesh relations experienced some strain. Following the 2026 Bangladeshi general election, when Tarique Rahman assumed office as Prime Minister of Bangladesh, efforts were undertaken by Verma, his team, and delegations from India, including S. Jaishankar and Vikram Misri, to restore and strengthen bilateral relations with Bangladesh.

=== Ambassador of India to the Kingdom of Belgium and the European Union ===
On April 10, 2026, Verma was appointed as the Ambassador of India to the Kingdom of Belgium and the European Union.
