= List of ambassadors of Peru to India =

Ambassador of Peru to the Republic of India
- Great Seal of Peru
- Ministry of Foreign Affairs
- Style: His or Her Excellency
- Appointer: The president of Peru
- Inaugural holder: Julio Eduardo Sarmiento Calmet
- Formation: 1963
- Website: Embassy of Peru in India

The extraordinary and plenipotentiary ambassador of Peru to the Republic of India is the official representative of the Republic of Peru to the Republic of India.

The ambassador in New Delhi is generally accredited to neighbouring countries, such as Afghanistan (suspended since 2021), Bangladesh, Iran, the Maldives, Nepal and Sri Lanka.

Both countries established diplomatic relations on 26 March 1963, which have continued since.

== List of representatives ==
Name	Portrait	Term begin	Term end	President	Notes
Julio Eduardo Sarmiento Calmet		May 6, 1963	December 31, 1972	Nicolás Lindley López	First representative of Peru to India.
Alberto Homero MacLean Urzúa		1975	1977	Juan Velasco Alvarado	As ambassador; concurrent to Iran and Sri Lanka.
Jorge Ramirez Del Rio		1982	January 27, 1984	Fernando Belaúnde	Ramirez presented his credentials to President Neelam Sanjiva Reddy on March 26, 1982. He went into a coma on January 24, 1984, dying three days later.
Alejandro San Martín		c. 1992	1996	Alberto Fujimori	As ambassador.
Carlos Higueras Ramos		1996	1999	Alberto Fujimori	Higueras presented his credentials to President Shankar Dayal Sharma on November 18, 1996.
Luis Rodomiro Hernández Ortiz		2000	2002	Alberto Fujimori	As ambassador.
Benjamín Alejandro Ruiz Sobero		2002	2006	Alejandro Toledo	As ambassador.
Javier Manuel Paulinich Velarde		2009	2015	Alan García	As ambassador; concurrent in Sri Lanka, Iran, Bangladesh, Nepal and the Maldives.
Jorge Juan Castañeda Méndez		October 12, 2016	2019	Pedro Pablo Kuczynski	Castañeda presented his credentials to President Shri Pranab Mukherjee on November 30, 2016.
Carlos Rafael Polo Castañeda		May 1, 2019	2022	Martín Vizcarra	As ambassador.
Javier Manuel Paulinich Velarde		December 25, 2022	2026	Dina Boluarte	As ambassador.

== See also ==
- List of ambassadors of India to Peru
