= List of high commissioners of India to New Zealand =

Head of mission of India to New Zealand

High Commissioner of India to New Zealand
- Emblem of India

- Flag of India
- Incumbent; Muanpuii Saiawi since 1 April 2026
- Style: His Excellency
- Type: High Commissioner
- Member of: Indian Foreign Service
- Reports to: Ministry of External Affairs
- Seat: High Commission of India, Wellington
- Appointer: President of India
- Term length: No fixed tenure
- Website: Indian High Commissioner to New Zealand

The high commissioner of India to New Zealand is the chief diplomatic representative of India to New Zealand, housed in the Indian High Commission located at 72 Pipitea Street, Thorndon, Wellington – 6011.

The high commission is headed by the High Commissioner, while a Consulate General located in Auckland is headed by a Consul General.

== List of Indian heads of mission ==
The following people have served as heads of mission to New Zealand.

=== Trade Commissioner ===
S. No.	Name	Entered office	Left office
1	B. K. Sanyal	1950	1952

=== High Commissioner ===
1951, the Government of India decided to give concurrent responsibility to High Commissioner in Canberra. B. K. Sanyal was redesignated as First Secretary (Commercial) and headed the High Commission as Cd'A, with non-resident High Commissioner serving from Canberra. Between 1952 and 1963 High Commissioners of India based in Canberra were concurrently accredited to New Zealand.

Non Resident High Commissioner
S. No.	Name	Entered office	Left office
1	K. S. Duleepsinghji	1952	1954
2	Gen. (Rtd) K. M. Cariappa	1954	1956
3	K. R. P. Singh	1956	1958
4	P. Achutha Menon	1958	1961
5	Samar Sen	1961	1963

Resident High Commissioner
S. No.	Name	Entered office	Left office
1	V. K. Ahuja	August 1963	December 1964
2	S. N. Chopra	April 1966	August 1969
3	P. S. Naskar	September 1969	April 1973
4	L. N. Ray	May 1973	December 1976
5	B. Devarao	December 1976	December 1979
6	A. K. Budhiraja	May 1980	April 1983
7	Adm. (Rtd.) O. S. Dawson	August 1985	August 1987
8	C. R. Balachandra	May 1988	November 1991
9	S. J. Singh	November 1991	August 1993
10	K. M. Meena	August 1994	May 1998
11	S. Kipgen	May 1998	April 2002
12	Bal Anand	May 2002	November 2003
13	Harish K. Dogra	September 2004	April 2006
14	K. P. Ernest	April 2006	April 2009
15	Adm. (Retd) S. Mehta	December 2009	December 2011
16	Avanindra K. Pandey	July 2012	August 2013
17	Ravi Thapar	December 2013	June 2015
18	Sanjiv Kohli	March 2016	May 2019
19	Muktesh K. Pardeshi	July 2019	July 2022
20	Neeta Bhushan	September 2022	March 2026
21	Muanpuii Saiawi	1 April 2026	Incumbent

== See also ==
- India–New Zealand relations
