= List of ambassadors of India to South Korea =

Head of mission of India to South Korea

Ambassador of India to South Korea
- Emblem of India

- Flag of India
- Incumbent; Gourangalal Das since September 2025
- Style: His Excellency
- Type: Ambassador
- Member of: Indian Foreign Service
- Reports to: Ministry of External Affairs
- Seat: Embassy of India, Seoul
- Appointer: President of India
- Term length: No fixed tenure
- Website: Indian Ambassador to South Korea

The ambassador of India to South Korea is the chief diplomatic representative of India to South Korea, housed in the Indian Embassy located at 101, Hannam Dong, Dokseodang-ro, Yongsan-gu, Seoul 04419, Republic of Korea.

The embassy is headed by the Ambassador.

== List of Indian Ambassadors ==
The following people have served as Ambassadors to South Korea.

S. No.	Name	Entered office	Left office
1	Syed Muzaffar Aga	December 1974	October 1977
2	V. V. Paranjpe	January 1978	June 1982
3	Arundhati Ghose	November 1982	September 1985
4	S. T. Devare	September 1985	Jun 1989
5	L. T. Pudaite	August 1989	July 1992
6	B. M. Oza	July 1992	August 1994
7	Shashank	November 1994	January 1999
8	Santosh Kumar	January 1999	August 2002
9	P. S. Ray	December 2002	September 2005
10	N. Parthasarathi	September 2005	September 2008
11	Skand R. Tayal	September 2008	November 2011
12	Vishnu Prakash	January 2012	March 2015
13	Vikram K. Doraiswami	April 2015	July 2018
14	Sripriya Ranganathan	August 2018	August 2022
15	Amit Kumar	September 2022	September 2025
16	Gourangalal Das	September 2025	
