= List of ambassadors of India to Iran =

Ambassador of India to Iran
- Emblem of India

- Flag of India
- Incumbent; Rudra Gaurav Shresth since 13 May 2023
- Type: Ambassador
- Member of: Indian Foreign Service
- Reports to: Ministry of External Affairs
- Appointer: President of India
- Term length: No fixed tenure
- Inaugural holder: Syed Ali Zaheer
- Website: Indian Ambassador to Iran

The ambassador of India to Iran is the chief diplomatic representative of India to Iran, housed in the Indian Embassy located at No. 8, Mohaseniyan St, Dolat Avenue, Tehran.

The embassy is headed by the Ambassador, while the consulates located in Bandar Abbas and Zahedan are headed by a Consul.

The following people have served as Ambassadors to Iran.

== List of Indian Ambassadors ==
S. No.	Name	Entered office	Left office
1	Seyed Ali Zaheer	26 January 1948	30 November 1950
2	Tara Chand	8 December 1951	21 September 1956
3	B. F. H. B. Tyabji	30 October 1956	29 August 1958
4	T. N. Kaul	11 September 1958	30 April 1961
5	M. R. A. Baig	4 May 1961	30 November 1964
6	A. M. Engineer	6 December 1964	6 December 1966
7	K. V. Padmanabhan	5 April 1967	5 April 1969
8	M. A. Rahman	16 April 1969	30 December 1971
9	R. D. Sathe	4 April 1972	13 July 1976
10	K. R. P. Singh	3 September 1976	22 April 1978
11	V. K. Ahuja	11 June 1978	20 November 1979
12	A. M. Khaleeli	27 April 1980	16 August 1984
13	A. B. Gokhale	25 August 1984	8 March 1987
14	R. C. Arora	5 May 1987	4 August 1990
15	M. H. Ansari	13 October 1990	3 January 1993
16	S. K. Arora	25 January 1993	4 July 1994
17	Siddharth Singh	25 July 1994	13 April 1997
18	R. S. Rathore	5 May 1997	14 September 2000
19	Paripuran Singh Haer	11 October 2000	30 August 2003
20	K. C. Singh	29 September 2003	27 November 2005
21	Manbir Singh	30 November 2005	2 March 2009
22	Sanjay Singh	12 March 2009	10 March 2011
23	D. P. Srivastava	28 August 2011	31 July 2015
24	Saurabh Kumar	25 August 2015	7 January 2019
25	Gaddam Dharmendra	23 February 2019	5 May 2023
26	Rudra Gaurav Shresth	13 May 2023	Incumbent
