= List of high commissioners of India to South Africa =

Head of mission of India to South Africa

High Commissioner of India to South Africa
- Emblem of India

- Flag of India
- Incumbent; Prabhat Kumar since 2 August 2023
- Style: His Excellency
- Type: High Commissioner
- Member of: Indian Foreign Service
- Reports to: Ministry of External Affairs
- Seat: High Commission of India, Pretoria
- Appointer: President of India
- Term length: No fixed tenure
- Website: Indian High Commissioner to South Africa

The high commissioner of India to South Africa is the chief diplomatic representative of India to South Africa, housed in the Indian High Commission located at 852, Francis Baard Street, Arcadia 0083, Pretoria, South Africa. The high commissioner is concurrently accredited to Lesotho.

The high commission is headed by the High Commissioner. while the Consulates General located in Cape Town, Durban and Johannesburg are headed by a Consul General.

== List of Indian heads of mission ==
=== To Union of South Africa ===
==== Agents of the Government of India ====
S. No.	Name	Entered office	Left office
1	V. S. Srinivasa Sastri	1927	1929
2	Kurma Venkata Reddi Naidu	1929	1932
3	Kunwar Maharaj Singh	1932	1935
4	Sir Syed Raza Ali	1935	1938
5	Sir Benegal Rama Rau	1938	1941

==== High Commissioners of India ====
S. No.	Name	Entered office	Left office
1	Sir Benegal Rama Rau	1941	1941
2	Sir Shafa'at Ahmad Khan	1941	1945
3	Ramrao Deshmukh	1945	23 May 1946

Interim Government of India severed diplomatic ties with apartheid Government of the Union of South Africa in 1946. India was the first country to do so.

=== To Republic of South Africa ===
India re-established diplomatic relation in 1993 and appointed high commissioner in 1994.

The following people have served as High Commissioners to South Africa.

S. No.	Name	Entered office	Left office
1	Madhav Keshav Mangalmurti	18 July 1994	May 1996
2	Gopalkrishna Gandhi	1 July 1996	7 November 1997
3	Lakshmi Chand Jain	8 December 1997	14 October 1998
4	Harsh Kumar Bhasin	23 November 1998	14 November 2000
5	Shiv Shankar Mukherjee	25 November 2000	23 September 2004
6	Santosh Kumar	2 November 2004	28 May 2005
7	Satyabrata Pal	19 July 2005	20 October 2006
8	Rajiv Kumar Bhatia	22 December 2006	30 November 2009
9	Virendra Gupta	8 June 2010	31 August 2014
10	Ruchi Ghanashyam	28 October 2014	13 April 2017
11	Ruchira Kamboj	25 July 2017	15 March 2019
12	Jaideep Sarkar	19 May 2019	31 March 2023
13	Prabhat Kumar	2 April 2023	Incumbent

== See also ==
- India–South Africa relations
