= India–Madagascar relations =

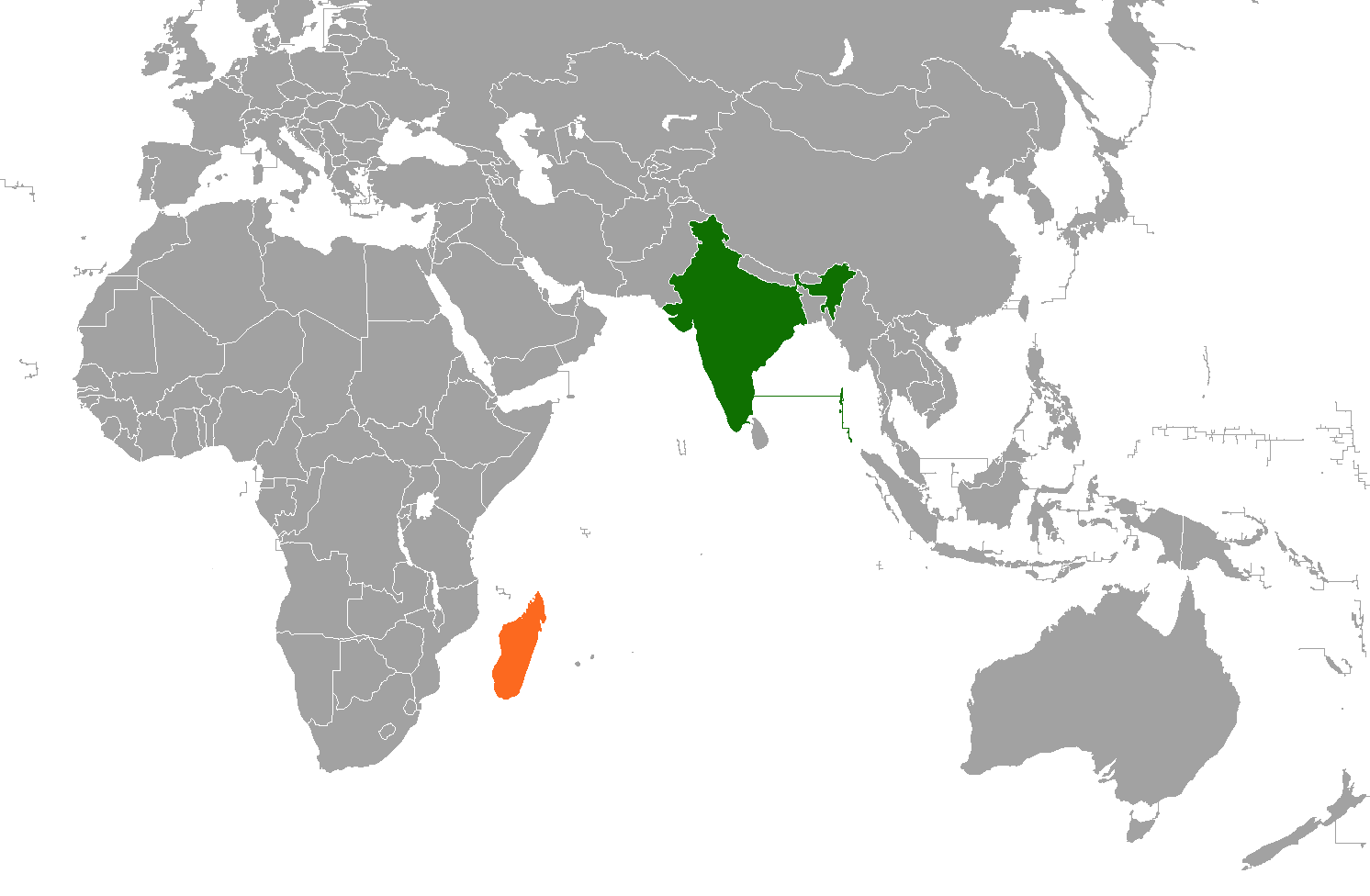
- India: Madagascar

India–Madagascar relations refers to the current and historical relationship between India and Madagascar. India has an embassy in Antananarivo and Madagascar has an embassy in New Delhi.

== History ==
Relations between Madagascar and western India began in the 18th century and regular trade dates to at least the late 19th century. Interstate relations began in 1954 when independent India established a consulate in French-controlled Madagascar. When Madagascar became independent in 1960, the consulate was upgraded to embassy status.

In February 2011, relations were considered cordial, with several high-level officials having had exchanging visits over the course of relations. Approximately 20,000 people of Indian origin lived in Madagascar, including 2,500 Indian citizens. During the Ambassadorship of Abhay Kumar, who took charge as the 21st Ambassador of India to Madagascar in March 2019, Madagascar became part of Indian Ocean Region Division of the Ministry of External Affairs of India reflecting increasing importance of Madagascar in Indo-Pacific region.

On 28 January 2020, the Indian Navy launched ‘Operation Vanilla' to help flood-struck Madagascar. Indian Navy's Airavat has been reached at Madagascar on January 30. Indian Navy's large amphibious ship will provide all necessary assistance to disaster-hit Madagascar. Indian Ambassador to Madagascar Abhay Kumar handed over the relief material to country's Prime Minister Christian Ntsay as part of New Delhi's efforts to support the people of the flood-hit African country. The relief material, which includes food items, clothing, and other essential consumer goods, arrived at the port of Antsiranana on Indian Naval Ship Airavat. Ntsay accepted the relief material from the Indian Ambassador Abhay Kumar in the presence of Commander Sunil Sankar, officers and men of INS Airvat at a brief function held at Antsiranana Port. Speaking on the occasion, Ambassador Kumar said that India stands with Madagascar in this hour of need. "We are two neighbours connected by the ocean. Our quick action to divert INS Airvat to support flood relief operations in Madagascar speaks louder than our words. India has always stood with its neighbours, whether land or maritime and will always continue to do so. We are often the first country to extend help whenever a neighbour faces a natural disaster."

Speaking in turn, Ntsay expressed his deep gratitude for the aid and remarked, "This moment is witness to excellent relations between India and Madagascar, it is a historic relationship and we are very proud of witnessing today this solidarity, generosity and brotherhood between the two countries." The ceremony was attended by senior civil and military dignitaries in addition to the Prime Minister and his delegation.

== High level visits ==
President Didier Ratsiraka visited India in 1980 and 1983.

President Hery Rajaonarimampianina visited India in October 2015 to attend the India Africa Forum–III Summit.

In March 2018, Ram Nath Kovind became the first Indian President to visit Madagascar. Kovind was conferred the Grand Cross of the Second Class, Madagascar's highest honour for non-citizens, by Prime Minister of Madagascar Olivier Solonandrasan.

== Trade and finance ==
In November 2008, Exim Bank gave Madagascar a $25 million subsidised loan for agricultural improvements. As of 2011, 61 Malagasy people had received training as part of the Indian Technical and Economic Cooperation Programme. In March 2018, to facilitate its financial assistance programme, India decided to offer Madagascar an aid of US$80.7 million for agricultural mechanisation, food security and healthcare services.

== Military ==
India Navy operates a Coastal Surveillance Radar (CSR) station in Madagascar.

== Geological history ==
In 2013, scientists discovered that Madagascar and India were part of Gondwanaland about 85 million years ago. The sliver of land joining them is called Mauritia. Madagascar was connected to the south-western part of India. However, it was later theorized that in the same timeframe, as India was on its way north east (into the Asian plate), Indian and Malagasy plates separated and thus leading to the state today. Due to this geological history, they share vegetation and both have dense evergreen forests.

Their geographical borders do show signs of earlier history with the Gulf of Khambhat (in Gujarat, India) aligning with the modern day city of Antsiranana (in Diana, Madagascar) considering the analogy of land on Earth as a giant puzzle piece.

== See also ==
- Foreign relations of India
- Foreign relations of Madagascar
