= List of ambassadors of India to Denmark =

Ambassador of India to the Kingdom of Denmark
- Incumbent; Manish Prabhat since 2 April 2024
- Type: Ambassador
- Member of: Indian Foreign Service
- Reports to: Ministry of External Affairs
- Seat: Embassy of India, Copenhagen
- Appointer: President of India
- Term length: No fixed tenure
- Website: Indian Ambassador to the Kingdom of Denmark

The Ambassador of India to the Kingdom of Denmark is the chief diplomatic representative of India to Denmark. The embassy is located in Vangehusvej 15, 2100 Copenhagen.

The embassy is headed by the Ambassador.

== List of Indian Ambassadors ==
The following persons have served as the Ambassador of India to the Kingdom of Denmark.

#	Name	Term start	Term end
Before 1962 the Indian Minister/Ambassador in Stockholm was concurrently accredited to Nordic countries.
1	K. M. Kannampilly	8 October 1962	6 July 1965
2	Avatar Singh	18 March 1966	25 April 1967
3	A. H. Safrani	18 May 1967	11 April 1969
4	M. R. Thadani	14 April 1969	20 January 1971
5	J. C. Kakar	22 January 1971	31 January 1973
6	K. Rukmani Menon	17 February 1973	8 February 1976
7	G. G. Bewoor	9 February 1976	28 February 1978
8	Prem Shunker	1 June 1978	1 October 1982
9	Manorama Bhalla	4 October 1982	29 June 1986
10	R. C. Shukla	31 July 1986	23 August 1989
11	Roma Majumdar	25 August 1989	24 August 1991
12	K. M. Lal	23 March 1992	29 February 1996
13	Neelam Deo	18 March 1996	16 March 1999
14	Shashank	26 March 1999	3 June 2001
15	H. K. Dua	10 July 2001	7 June 2003
16	Harsh K. Bhasin	14 June 2003	13 June 2005
17	Partha Sarathi Ray	26 October 2005	29 February 2008
18	Yogesh Kumar Gupta	10 March 2008	31 August 2010
19	Ashok Kumar Attri	4 October 2010	30 June 2013
20	Nirai Srivastava	3 August 2013	31 October 2015
21	Rajeev Shahare	23 January 2016	31 August 2017
22	Ajit Gupte	2 September 2017	10 March 2021
23	Pooja Kapur	19 March 2021	31 March 2024
24	Manish Prabhat	2 April 2024	Incumbent

== See also ==
- Denmark–India relations
