= Vishal V. Sharma =

Indian politician

Vishal V. Sharma is an Indian political figure. Sharma has been nominated as India's ambassador/permanent representative to UNESCO.

Sharma has previously worked as an officer on special duty for Narendra Modi in Gujarat, India.

== Education ==
Sharma has a Bachelor of Science in physics and a certificate in Executive Programme in Business Management from IIM Calcutta.
