= List of ambassadors of India to Madagascar =

Ambassador of India to Madagascar
- Incumbent; Bandaru Wilsonbabu since October 2022
- Nominator: Droupadi Murmu
- Inaugural holder: J.A. Shah
- Formation: 1960
- Website: Embassy of India, Antananarivo, Madagascar

This is a list of Indian Ambassadors to Madagascar. Indian Embassy opened in Madagascar in 1960. Earlier India had opened a Consulate General in 1954 which was upgraded into an embassy in 1960 after Madagascar became an independent country in 1960. Currently the Indian Ambassador in Antananarivo is also accredited to Comoros.

== List of Indian Ambassadors to Madagascar ==
Name	Image	Entered office	Left office	Notes
J.A. Shah		Jan 1961	Nov 1961	
S.G. Ramchandran		1962	1965	
C.J. Stracey		1965	1968	
A.R. Sethi		1968	1969	
N. Kesavan		1970	1972	
K.R. Krishnaswami		1973	1976	
A.W.B. Waz		1977	1980	
S.N. Puri		1980	1983	
I.S. Rathode		1983	1986	
K.R.Sinha		1987	1990	
A.K.Basu		1990	1994	
P.V. Joshi		1994	1996	
Prabhakara Jha		1996	1999	
A. Beuria		1999	2001	
Sibabrata Tripathi		2002	2005	
Diljit Singh Pannun		2005	2007	
Azad Singh Toor		2008	2012	
Manju Seth		2013	2014	
C.B. Thapliyal		2014	2016	
Subir Dutta		2016	2018	
Abhay Kumar		2019	2022	IFS officer, Noted Indian Poet
Bandaru Wilsonbabu		2022	Incumbent	

== See also ==
- Embassy of India, Madagascar
- India–Madagascar_relations
- Indians in Madagascar
