= List of ambassadors of India to Algeria =

Ambassador of India to Algeria
- Incumbent; Gaurav Ahluwalia since August 2021
- Seat: Algiers, Algeria
- Inaugural holder: S. Sen
- Formation: 1962

Ambassador is in charge of the Embassy of India, Algiers. Swati Vijay Kulkarni is the current Ambassador of India to Algeria.

The following people have served as Ambassadors of India to Algeria.

== Ambassador of India to Algeria ==
Former Ambassadors
| Sr. No | Name of the Ambassador | Tenure |
|---|---|---|
| 1 | Samar Sen | August, 1962 to November, 1964 |
| 2 | R. Goburdhun | December, 1964 to July, 1967 |
| 3 | Mohammad Yunus | August, 1967 to August, 1971 |
| 4 | Bimalendu Kumar Sanyal | September, 1971 to December, 1972 |
| 5 | Syed Shahabuddin | May, 1973 to July, 1975 |
| 6 | K.K.S. Rana | October, 1975 to November, 1979 |
| 7 | Krishan Mohan Lal | April, 1980 to July, 1982 |
| 8 | K. V. Rajan | September, 1982 to September, 1985 |
| 9 | V. K. Nambiar | December, 1985 to March, 1988 |
| 10 | C. P. Ravindranathan | July, 1988 to May, 1991 |
| 11 | T.C.A. Rangachari | September, 1991 to May, 1994 |
| 12 | Jayant Prasad | June, 1995 to August, 1998 |
| 13 | Mahesh Kumar Sachdev | January, 1999 to September, 2001 |
| 14 | R. N. Prasad | October, 2002 to August, 2005 |
| 15 | Dr. Ashok Amrohi | August, 2005 to October, 2009 |
| 16 | Kuldeep Singh Bhardwaj | May, 2010 to May, 2016 |
| 17 | Satbir Singh | October, 2016 to August, 2020 |
| 18 | Gaurav Ahluwalia | 2020 - 2024 |
| 19 | Swati Vijay Kulkarni | 13 September 2024 |

== See also ==
- Embassy of India, Algiers
