= List of high commissioners of India to Tanzania =

Indian High Commissioner to Tanzania
- Incumbent; Debnath Shaw since July 2012
- Type: High Commissioner
- Formation: November 1961
- First holder: M. A. Vellodi

This is a list of Indian High Commissioners to Tanzania. India has a relatively large diplomatic network, reflecting its links in the world and particularly in neighboring regions: Central Asia, the Middle East, East Africa, Southeast Asia and the Indian subcontinent. There are also far-flung missions in the Caribbean and the Pacific, locations of historical Indian diaspora communities.

As a Commonwealth country, Indian diplomatic missions in the capital cities of other Commonwealth member states are known as High Commissions. In other cities of Commonwealth countries. India calls some of its consulates "Assistant High Commissions".

== Indian High Commissioners to Tanganyika (1961 to 1964) ==
- M. A. Vellodi - November 1961–September 1962 - High Commissioner to Tanganyika.
- R. D. Sathe - December 1962–December 1964 - High Commissioner to Tanganyika to 1964.

== Indian High Commissioners to Tanzania (since 1964) ==
- N. V. Rao - July 1965–November 1967 - High Commissioner to Tanzania.
- V.C.Vijayaraghavan - January 1968–November 1970
- Jagat Singh Mehta - December 1970–April 1974
- K. D. Sharma - September 1974–July 1978
- Alfred S. Gonsalves - August 1978–October 1981
- P. M. S. Malik - November 1981–July 1983
- Chandrashekhar Dasgupta - February 1984–July 1986
- H. D. Bhalla - August 1986 - January 1990
- Sharad K. Bhatnagar - February 1990–December 1993
- O. P. Gupta - August 1994–January 1998
- Virendra Gupta - May 1998–July 2001
- Dinesh Kumar Jain - August 2001–November 2004
- Debashish Chakravarti - December 2004–2007
- Kocheril Velayudhan Bhagirath - August 2007–December 2011
- Debnath Shaw - July 2012–
