= List of ambassadors of India to Finland =

Ambassador of India to Finland
- Incumbent; Hemant H. Kotalwar since 5 July 2024
- Type: Ambassador
- Member of: Indian Foreign Service
- Reports to: Ministry of External Affairs
- Appointer: President of India
- Term length: No fixed tenure
- First holder: Cyril John Stracey
- Website: Indian Ambassador to Finland

The Ambassador of India to the Republic of Finland is the chief diplomatic representative of India to Finland. The embassy is located in 32 Kulosaarentie, 00570, Helsinki. The embassy is headed by the Ambassador.

The following people have served as Ambassadors to the Republic of Finland.

== List of Indian ambassadors ==
S. No.	Name	Entered office	Left office
1	Cyril John Stracey	25 October 1968	1 September 1973
2	Mihir Kumar Roy	14 September 1973	11 January 1975
3	Shardul Bikram Shah	31 January 1975	11 January 1977
4	Shiam Sunder Nath	26 August 1977	1 October 1980
5	Madanjeet Singh	17 October 1980	1982
6	Avadhuth Raoji Kakodkar	7 May 1982	19 July 1985
7	Kalarickal Praanchu Fabian	28 May 1985	9 June 1989
8	Thangkima Cherpoot	16 June 1989	9 November 1992
9	Prithvi Raj Sood	4 December 1992	1 November 1995
10	Kamlesh Kumar	20 September 1996	15 October 1998
11	C.R. Balachandra	25 February 1999	28 February 2001
12	Om Prakash Gupta	26 September 2001	12 August 2005
13	Pradeep Singh	21 August 2005	28 February 2009
14	Om Prakash	7 March 2009	30 September 2010
15	Aladlyan Manickam	8 October 2010	31 August 2014
16	Ashok Kumar Sharma	5 September 2014	30 June 2017
17	Vani Rao	25 July 2017	15 July 2020
18	Raveesh Kumar	17 July 2020	27 June 2024
19	Hemant H. Kotalwar	5 July 2024	Incumbent
