= List of high commissioners of India to Kenya =

Indian High Commissioner to Kenya
- Incumbent; Dr. Adarsh Swaika since October 2025
- Ministry of External Affairs (India)
- Type: High Commissioner
- Reports to: Ministry of External Affairs (India)
- Nominator: Ram Nath Kovind
- Term length: 3 to 4 years.
- First holder: Apa Saheb Pant
- Website: https://hcinairobi.gov.in/eoinrb_pages/MTU2

The high commissioner of the Republic of India to Kenya is India's foremost diplomatic representative in the Republic of Kenya, and in charge of India's diplomatic mission in Kenya.

As a Commonwealth country, Indian diplomatic missions in the capital cities of other Commonwealth member states are known as High Commissions. In other cities of Commonwealth countries, India calls some of its consulates "Assistant High Commissions".

== List of high commissioners of India to the Republic of Kenya ==
The current high commissioner is Dr. Adarsh Swaika.

High commissioners of India to the Republic of Kenya
| Sr. No | Name | Tenure |
|---|---|---|
| 1. | Apa Pant | 1948–1954 |
| 2. | M.G.Menon | 1954–1956 |
| 3. | Prem Kishan | 1956–1958 |
| 4. | I. J.Bahadur Singh | 1958–1960 |
| 5. | K.P.F.Khilnani | 1961–1963 |
| 6. | R.K.Tandon | 1963–1965 |
| 7. | Prem Bhatia | 1965–1969 |
| 8. | Avtar Singh | 1969–1970 |
| 9. | Gurbachan Singh | 1970–1972 |
| 10. | K.C.Nair | 1972–1974 |
| 11. | Air Chief Marshal Arjan Singh | 1974–1977 |
| 12. | A. N. D. Haksar | 1977–1980 |
| 13. | V.K. Grover | 1980–1983 |
| 14. | K.K.S.Rana | 1984–1986 |
| 15. | Manorama Bhalla | 1986–1989 |
| 16. | P.P.D'Souza | 1989–1992 |
| 17. | Kiran Doshi | 1992–1995 |
| 18. | T.P.Srinivasan | 1995–1997 |
| 19. | R.K.Bhatia | 1998–2002 |
| 20. | Y.M.Tiwari | 2002–2003 |
| 21. | Surendra Kumar | 2003–2006 |
| 22. | P.S. Randhawa | 2006–2010 |
| 23. | Sibabrata Tripathi | 2010–2014 |
| 24. | Yogeshwar Varma | 2014–2015 |
| 25. | Suchitra Durai | 2015–2018 |
| 26. | Rahul Chhabra | November 2018 – June 2020 |
| 27. | Dr. Virander Kumar Paul | September 2020 — August 2022 |
| 28. | Smt. Namgya C. Khampa | September 2022 — June 2025 |
| 29. | Dr. Adarsh Swaika | October 2025— |
