= List of ambassadors of India to Peru =

Ambassador of India to Peru
- Ministry of Foreign Affairs
- Nominator: President of India
- Website: Embassy of India, Lima

The Indian Ambassador to Peru is the chief diplomatic representative of India to Peru, housed in the Indian Embassy in Lima. Diplomatic relations date back to 1963, and in September 1969 India opened an embassy in Peru.

== List of Indian ambassadors to Peru ==
Name	Photo	Entered office	Left office	Notes
Perala Ratnam		May 1963	November 1964	Residence in Santiago.
Bhagwan Khemchand Massand		May 1965	December 1967	Residence in Santiago.
B. Kanhaiya Lal Mehta		August 1968	December 1970	Residence in Santiago.
Pascal Alan Nazareth		September 1969	November 1973	Chargé d'affaires
Ascharj Ram Sethi		November 1973	December 1975	First resident ambassador in Peru.
Manorama Bhalla		July 1976	December 1978	
Sarv Kumar Kathpalia		June 1979	October 1982	
Sushil Dubey		April 1983	July 1986	
Savitri Kunadi		October 1986	June 1989	
Dilip Lahiri		August 1989	October 1992	
Thangkima Cherpoot		January 1993	October 1995	
Nirupama Rao		December 1995	May 1998	
Butshikan Singh		December 1998	September 2002	
Riewad V. Warjri		September 2002	February 2007	
Appunni Ramesh		February 2007	August 2011	
Manpreet Vohra		August 1, 2011	April 4, 2015	
Sandeep Chakravorty		July 20, 2015	August 2, 2017	
Mandarapu Subbarayudu		April 26, 2018	March 6, 2023	
Shri Vishvas Vidu Sapkal		July 13, 2023	October 10, 2025	

== See also ==
- India–Peru relations
- List of ambassadors of Peru to India
