= List of ambassadors and high commissioners to India =

The following is the list of ambassadors and high commissioners to India. High commissioners represent member states of the Commonwealth of Nations and ambassadors represent other states. Some diplomats are accredited to more than one country.

Sending Country	Citation	Name of Ambassador	Year Joined In
Afghanistan	List	Farid Mamundzay	2021
Albania	Citation	Dikshu C. Kukreja (Honorary Consul)	
Algeria	Citation	Mr Abdenor Khelifi	2025
Andorra			
Angola	Citation	Mr. Clemente Camenha	
Antigua and Barbuda	Citation	Mr. Vijay Tewani (Honorary Consul)	2021
Argentina		Mariano Agustín Caucino	2024
Armenia	Citation	Mr. Vahagn AFYAN	2024
Australia	List	Philip Green	2023
Austria	Citation	Robert Zischg	2026
Azerbaijan	Citation	Elchin Huseynli	
Bahamas		Lowell Mortimer	
Bahrain	Citation	Abdulrahman Mohammed Al Gaoud	2018
Bangladesh	List	M. Riaz Hamidullah	2025
Barbados		N/A	
Belarus	Citation	Mikhail Kasko	2024
Belgium	Citation	Didier Vanderhasselt	2018
Belize	Citation	Mr. Umesh Modi (Honorary Consul)	
Benin	Citation	Mr Erick Jean-Marie Zinsou	2025
Bhutan	Citation	Major General Vetsop Namgyel	2009
Bolivia	Citation	Ms. Arlette Gabriela Bustamante Garcia	
Bosnia and Herzegovina	Citation	Haris Hrle	2023
Botswana	Citation	Gilbert Shimane Mangole	2019
Brazil	Citation	Kenneth Félix Haczynski da Nóbrega	2022
Brunei	List	Alaihuddin Taha	2021
Bulgaria	Citation	Dr. Nikolay Yankov	2023
Burkina Faso	Citation	Dr Desire Boniface	2023
Burundi	Citation	Maj. Gen. Aloys Bizindavyi	2023
Cambodia	Citation	Ms Rath Many	2025
Cameroon	Citation	Sylvie-Michele Mpon Tiek Mambo	
Canada	List	Christopher Cooter	2025
Cape Verde		Dr. Sanjay K. Dewan (Honorary Consul)	
Central African Republic		N/A	
Chad	Citation	Mrs Ildjima Badda Mallot	2025
Chile	Citation	Mr. Juan Angulo M.	2019
China	List	Xu Feihong	2024
Colombia	Citation	Victor Hugo Echeverri Jaramillo	
Comoros	Citation	Mr. Kanahiya Lal Ganju (Honorary Consul)	
DRC			
Republic of the Congo			
Costa Rica			
Croatia			
Cuba	Citation	Mr Juan Carlos Marsan Aguilera	2025
Cyprus			
Czech Republic			
Denmark			
Djibouti			
Dominica			
Dominican Republic			
Ecuador			
Egypt		Kamel Zayed Galal	
El Salvador			
Equatorial Guinea	Citation	Mr. Manuel Mbela Bama	2016
Eritrea			
Estonia			
Eswatini			
Ethiopia			
Fiji			
Finland	Citation	Kimmo Lähdevirta	2023
France	Citation	Thierry Mathou	2023
Gabon			
Gambia			
Georgia	Citation	Vakhtang Jaoshvili	2024
Germany	List	Jasper Wieck	2026
Ghana			
Greece	Citation	Aliki Koutsomitopoulou	2023
Grenada			
Guatemala			
Guinea			
Guinea-Bissau			
Guyana			
Haiti			
Honduras			
Hungary			
Iceland	Citation	Benedikt Höskuldsson	2024
Indonesia	Citation	Ina Hagniningtyas Krishnamurthi	
Iran			
Iraq			
Ireland	Citation	Kevin Kelly	2022
Israel	Citation	Reuven Azar	2024
Italy	Citation	Antonio Bartoli	2024
Ivory Coast			
Jamaica			
Japan	Citation	Keiichi Ono	2024
Jordan			
Kazakhstan			
Kenya			
Kiribati			
Kuwait			
Kyrgyzstan			
Laos			
Latvia			
Lebanon			
Lesotho			
Liberia			
Libya			
Liechtenstein			
Lithuania			
Luxembourg			
Madagascar			
Malawi			
Malaysia	List	Dato' Muzafar Shah Mustafa	2023
Maldives	Citation	Ms Aishath Azeema	2025
Mali			
Malta			
Marshall Islands			
Mauritania			
Mauritius			
Mexico			
Micronesia			
Moldova			
Monaco			
Mongolia			
Montenegro			
Morocco			
Mozambique			
Myanmar			
Namibia			
Nauru			
Nepal	Citation	Dr. Shankar P. Sharma	2025
Netherlands	Citation	Ms Marisa Gerards	2023
New Zealand	List	Patrick Rata	2024
Nicaragua			
Niger	Citation	Mr Zada Seidou	2025
Nigeria	Citation	Geoffrey Onyeama	
North Korea			
North Macedonia		Mr. Slobodan Uzunov	2022
Norway	Citation	May-Elin Stener	2023
Oman	Citation	Issa Saleh Abdullah Alshibani	
Pakistan	Citation	Saad Ahmad Warraich	2022
Palau			
Palestine		Abdullah Abu Shawesh	2024
Panama			
Papua New Guinea			
Paraguay			
Peru	List	Javier Manuel Paulinich Velarde	2022
Philippines	Citation	Ignacio	
Poland	Citation	Mr. Piotr Antoni Świtalski	2025
Portugal	Citation	João Ribeiro de Almeida	
Qatar	Citation	Mohammed Hassan Jabir Al-Jabir	2023
Romania			
Russia	List	Denis Alipov	2022
Rwanda			
Saint Kitts and Nevis			
Saint Lucia			
Saint Vincent and the Grenadines			
Samoa			
San Marino			
São Tomé and Príncipe			
Saudi Arabia	Citation	Saud bin Mohammed Al-Saty	
Senegal			
Serbia	Citation	Siniša Pavić	
Seychelles			
Sierra Leone			
Singapore	Citation	Mr Simon Wong	
Slovakia			
Slovenia			
Solomon Islands			
Somalia	Citation	Dr Abdullahi Mohammed Odowa	2025
South Africa	Citation	Prof Anil Sooklal	
South Korea		Mr. Lee Seong-ho	
South Sudan			
Spain	Citation	Juan Antonio March Pujol	
Sri Lanka	List	Ms. Mahishini Colonne	2025
Sudan			
Suriname			
Sweden			
Switzerland	List	Maya Tissafi	2024
Syria			
Tajikistan			
Tanzania			
Thailand	List	Chavanart Thangsumphant	2025
Timor-Leste			
Togo			
Tonga			
Trinidad and Tobago		Chandradath Singh	2026
Tunisia			
Turkey			
Turkmenistan			
Tuvalu			
Uganda			
Ukraine	Citation	Dr. Oleksandr Polishchuk	2023
UAE	Citation	Dr. Abdulnasser Alshaali	2022
United Kingdom	List	Lindy Cameron	2024
USA	List	Sergio Gor	2025
Uruguay			
Uzbekistan			
Vanuatu			
Venezuela			
Vietnam			
Yemen			
Zambia			
Zimbabwe			
EU			

== See also ==
- Foreign relations of India
- List of ambassadors and high commissioners of India
- List of diplomatic missions of India
- List of diplomatic missions in India
- Visa policy of India
- Visa requirements for Indian citizens
