= List of ambassadors of India to Sudan =

Ambassador of India to Sudan
- Incumbent; Vacant
- Type: Ambassador
- Member of: Indian Foreign Service
- Reports to: Ministry of External Affairs
- Appointer: President of India
- Term length: No fixed tenure
- Website: Indian Ambassador to Sudan

The Ambassador of India to the Republic of the Sudan is the chief diplomatic representative of India to Sudan. The embassy is located in Plot No. 2, Al Amarat Street No. 01, Block 12 DH, Eastern Extension P.O. Box 707, Khartoum. Due to ongoing conflict in Sudan it is temporarily relocated to Somarain Building, First Floor, Near Zain Office J6CF+86F, Port Sudan. The embassy is headed by the Ambassador.

The following people have served as Ambassadors to the Republic of the Sudan.

== List of Indian ambassadors ==
S. No.	Name	Entered office	Left office
1	Midhat Kamil Kidwai (Liaison Officer/Cd’A)	March 1955	July 1957
2	Chalakuzhy Paulose Mathen	July 1957	April 1958
3	R.G. Rajwade	March 1959	September 1960
4	Shaukatullah Shah Ansari	December 1962	November 1966
5	Ganga Dhar	December 1966	May 1967
6	P.L. Bhandari	May 1967	May 1969
7	Kantilal L. Dalal	August 1969	December 1972
8	Indu Prakash Singh	May 1973	December 1975
9	Khwaja Mubarak Shah	June 1976	September 1978
10	Surendra Mohan Singh Chaddha	October 1978	December 1981
11	L.N. Rangarajan	December 1981	October 1984
12	Nareshwar Dayal	December 1984	December 1985
13	Thangkima Cherpoot	March 1986	May 1989
14	Virendra Pal Singh	January 1990	January 1992
15	Rajendra K Rai	November 1992	February 1995
16	G.P. Isser	April 1995	December 1997
17	Lal Thla Muana	September 1998	December 2001
18	Ashok Kumar	December 2002	August 2005
19	Deepak Vohra	October 2005	March 2010
20	Avanindra Kumar Pandey	May 2010	June 2012
21	Sanjay Kumar Verma	February 2013	August 2015
22	Amrit Lugun	August 2015	November 2017
23	Ravindra Prasad Jaiswal	January 2018	December 2021
24	B.S. Mubarak	January 2022	August 2023
