= List of high commissioners of India to Malaysia =

High Commissioner of India to Malaysia
- Incumbent; B. N. Reddy since September 2021
- Ministry of External Affairs (India)
- Type: High Commissioner
- Member of: Indian Foreign Service
- Reports to: Ministry of External Affairs
- Appointer: President of India
- Term length: No fixed tenure
- Website: Indian High Commissioners to Malaysia

The high commissioner of India to Malaysia is the head of the High Commission of India to Malaysia. The High Commission is located at Level 1, Wisma HRIH Lotus, 442, Jalan Pahang, Setapak, 53000 Kuala Lumpur.

As a Commonwealth country, Indian diplomatic missions in the capital cities of other Commonwealth member states are known as High Commissions. In other cities of Commonwealth countries. India calls some of its consulates "Assistant High Commissions".

The high commission is headed by the high commissioner. The following people have served as high commissioners to Malaysia.

== List of Indian high commissioners ==
S. No.	Name	Tenure
1	S. K. Banerji	November 1959
2	Y. K. Puri	October 1960
3	M. K. Kidwai	1964
4	M. A. Rahman	1967–1969
5	K. C. Nair	1969–1972
6	A. K. Dar	May 1972–July 1973
7	S. J. S. Chhatwal	October 1975–August 1979
8	Prakash Shah	May 1980–June 1983
9	Ranjit Sethi	August 1983–August 1986
10	P. M. S Malik	October 1986–August 1990
11	R. S. Rathore	August 1990–December 1992
12	V. K. Nambair	January 1993–June 1996
13	P. S. Sahai	October 1996–August 2000
14	Veena Sikri	September 2000–December 2003
15	R. L. Narayan	January 2004–February 2007
16	Ashok K. Kantha	April 2007–November 2009
17	Vijay Gokhale	January 2010–October 2013
18	T. S. Tirumurti	December 2013–February 2018
19	Mridul Kumar	February 2018–July 2021
20	B. N. Reddy	September 2021–

== See also ==
- India–Malaysia relations
