= List of ambassadors of India to Brazil =

Ambassador of India to Brazil
- Type: Ambassador
- Member of: Indian Foreign Service
- Reports to: Ministry of External Affairs
- Appointer: President of India
- Term length: No fixed tenure
- Website: Indian Ambassador to Brazil

The Ambassador of India to the Federative Republic of Brazil is the chief diplomatic representative of India to Brazil. The embassy is located in SES 805 Lote 24, Asa Sul, Brasília, Federal District; CEP: 70452–901.

The embassy is headed by the Ambassador, while a consulate located in São Paulo is headed by a Consulate general.

The following people have served as Ambassadors to Brazil.

== List of Indian Ambassadors ==
Name	Entered office	Left office
M. R. Masani	May 1948	May 1949
Joginder Sen	May 1952	March 1956
L. R. S. Singh	April 1956	July 1958
M. K. Kriplani ICS	October 1958	December 1961
V. H. Coelho	February 1963	January 1965
B. K. Acharya	July 1966	December 1968
S. V. Patel	April 1969	December 1970
Prithi Singh	June 1971	November 1974
Narendra Singh	November 1974	February 1977
H. S. Vahali	May 1977	September 1980
S. S. Nath	October 1980	June 1985
Air Chief Marshall Dilbagh Singh	August 1985	August 1987
A. R. Kakodar	September 1987	May 1991
P. K. Budhwar	June 1991	November 1992
G. S. Bedi	December 1992	May 1996
Ishrat Aziz	June 1996	September 1998
M. P. M. Menon	January 1999	April 2002
Amitava Tripathi	June 2002	October 2005
H. S. Puri	January 2006	June 2008
B. S. Prakash	August 2008	October 2012
Ashok Tomar	March 2013	August 2014
Sunil Lal	September 2014	October 2017
Ashok Das	March 2018	September 2020
Suresh Reddy	13 September 2020	26 July 2022

== See also ==
- Brazil–India relations
