= List of ambassadors of India to Romania =

Ambassador of India to Romania
- Emblem of India
- Incumbent; Dr. Manoj Kumar Mohapatra, IFS; Ambassador of India to Romania, Albania and Moldova since July 2025
- Style: His or Her Excellency
- Seat: Bucharest, Romania
- Nominator: Ram Nath Kovind
- Formation: 1968
- Website: https://www.eoibucharest.gov.in/

The Ambassador of India to Romania is the Republic of India's foremost diplomatic representative and head of India's diplomatic mission in Romania. The Ambassador resides in Bucharest and is concurrently accredited as a non-resident Ambassador to both Albania and Moldova.

== List of Indian ambassadors to Romania ==
Name	Start of Term	End of Term
Dr. Manoj Kumar Mohapatra	2025	Incumbent
Manika Jain	2024	2025
Rahul Shrivastava	2020	2024
Thanglura Darlong	2018	2020
Dr. A.V.S Ramesh Chandra	2016	2018
Riva Ganguly Das	2015	2016
Manimekalai Murugesan	2011	2015
Debashish Chakravarti	2007	2011
Ram Mohan	2005	2007
Ajai Malhotra	2003	2005
Jawahar Lal	2001	2003
Rajiv Dogra	1997	2001
Manilal Tripathi	1994	1997
Julio Francis Ribeiro	1989	1993

The current ambassador is Rahul Shrivastava who succeeded Thanglura Darlong in July, 2020.

== See also ==
- India–Romania relations
