= List of ambassadors of India to Angola =

Ambassador of India to Angola
- Incumbent; Pratibha Parkar since August 2021
- Seat: Luanda, Angola
- Inaugural holder: Sushil Dubey

Ambassador is in charge of the Embassy of India, Luanda. Vidhu P Nair is the current Ambassador of India to Angola.

The following people have served as Ambassadors of India to Angola.

== Ambassador of India to Angola ==
Indian Ambassador to Angola (since 1986)
S.No.	Name	Tenure
1	Sushil Dubey	10 Nov 1986 - 23 May 1988
2.	Vaman Sardesai	6 July 1988 - 13 Aug 1991
3.	B.R Chulliani	13 Sept 1991 – 29 Mar 1994
4.	S.K. Mandal	30 Nov 1995 – 26 Aug 1997
5.	U.C. Baro	22 Oct 1997 – 30 Nov 2000
6.	R.M. Aggrawal	7Mar 2002 – 7 July 2005
7.	Mohammed Afzal	29 Jul 2005 – 27 Jul 2007
8.	A.R. Ghanashyam	6 Oct 2007 – 16 Sept 2010
9.	Debraj Pradhan	20 Oct 2011 – 5 Feb 2014
10.	Sushil kumar Singhal	5 Sept 2015 – 8 May 2018
11.	Srikumar Menon	10 May 2018 – 30 Nov 2019
12.	Pratibha Parkar	28 July 2020 - 15 Aug 2023

== See also ==
- Embassy of India, Luanda
