= Meera Shankar =

Indian diplomat

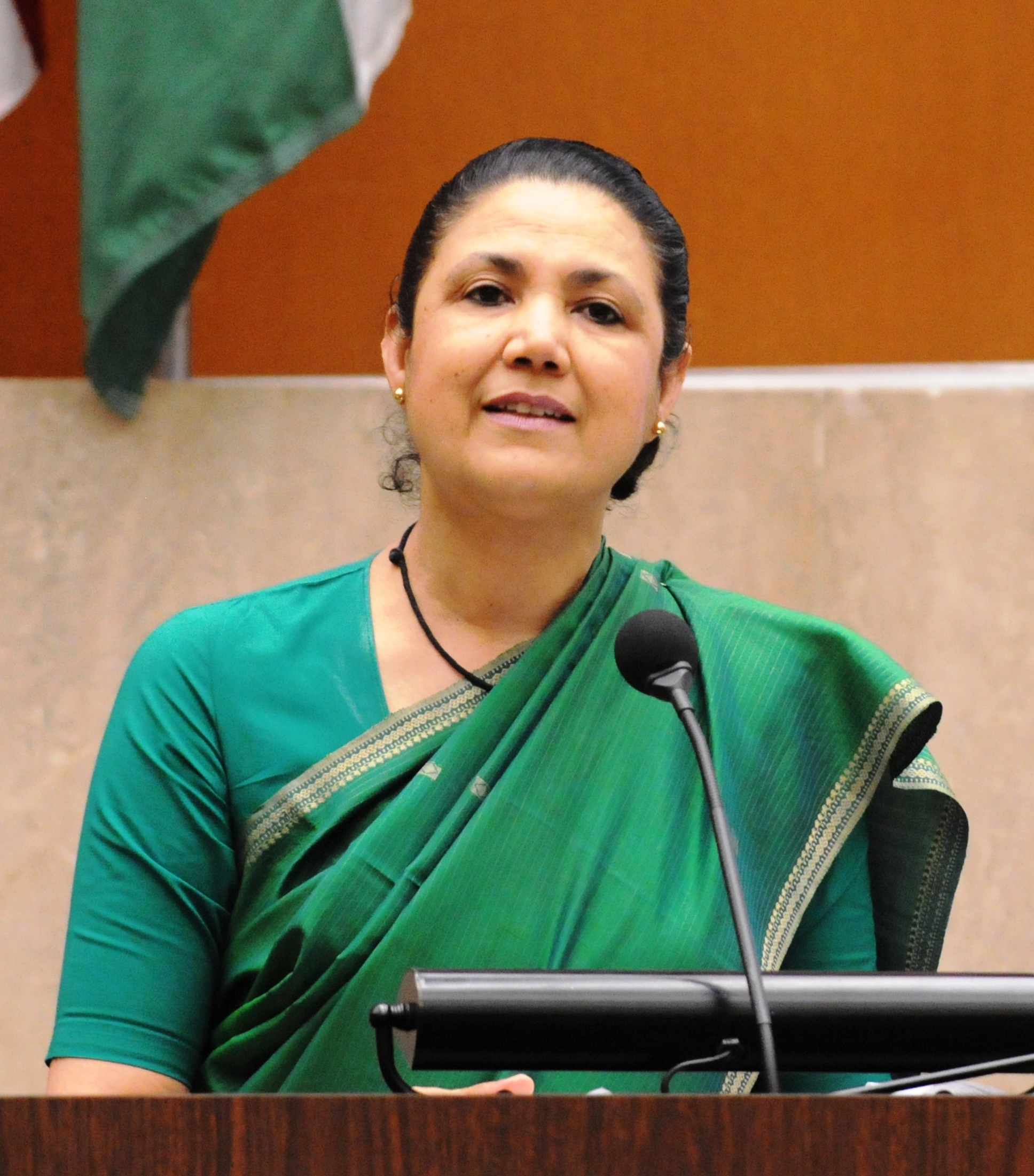
- Meera Shankar at the U.S.-India People to People Conference in 2010
- Born: Meera Yadav; 9 October 1950 (age 74)

Ambassador of India to the United States
- In office 2009–2011
- Preceded by: Ronen Sen
- Succeeded by: Nirupama Rao

Meera Shankar (née Yadav) served as India's Ambassador to the United States of America from 26 April 2009 to 2011. She was India's second female ambassador to the United States of America, Vijaya Lakshmi Nehru Pandit being the first. She was succeeded by Nirupama Rao on 1 August 2011.

Shankar, an officer of the 1973 batch, was posted in Washington, D.C., from 1991 to 1995. She succeeded Ambassador Ronen Sen.

== Early life and career ==
Meera Shankar studied at St. Mary's Convent in Nainital and then graduated from St. Bede's College, Shimla and joined the Indian Foreign Service in 1973.

Shankar served as Director in the Prime Minister’s Office from 1985 to 1991, and in the Ministry of Commerce and Industry from 1991 to 1995. While serving in the Ministry of External Affairs, she headed two important divisions dealing with the South Asian Association of Regional Cooperation (SAARC) and relations with Nepal and Bhutan.

Prior to 2009, she served as India's Ambassador in Berlin, Germany.

Shankar was the first serving diplomat to be posted in Washington in more than two decades after G.Shankar Bajpai. In 2003, she achieved the rank of Additional Secretary, she held the responsibility for the United Nations and International Security.

== Other activities ==
Shankar sits on the Board of Trustees of the Alfred Herrhausen Gesellschaft of Deutsche Bank. In 2012 she became the first woman on the board of directors of the Indian conglomerate ITC.

== Personal life ==
Shankar is married to Ajay Shankar, IAS officer of the 1973 batch. They have a daughter, Priya.

== Controversies ==
Shankar was in the news after she went through a pat-down check at Jackson–Evers airport in December 2010, joining the list of Indian VIPs who underwent frisking or quizzing at US airports. The incident led to diplomatic protests from India.

== See also ==
- List of ambassadors to the United States
- Embassy of India in Washington, D.C.
- Harsh Vardhan Shringla
- Navtej Sarna

Political offices
Preceded by Ronen Sen	Indian Ambassador to the United States; 2009-2011	Succeeded by Nirupama Rao
