= Aparna Basu =

Indian historian (1931–2018)

- Born: 31 October 1931
- Died: 3 December 2018 (aged 87)

Academic background
- Education: University of Cambridge
- Thesis: The growth of education and political development in India, 1898–1920 (1974)

Aparna Basu (31 October 1931 – 3 December 2018) was an Indian historian, author, social worker and advocate for women's rights. She was a professor of Modern Indian history and head of the History department at Delhi University. In her later career, she served as President of the All India Women's Conference (AIWC) and chairperson of the National Gandhi Museum in New Delhi.

== Early life and education ==
Basu was born in Ahmedabad, Gujarat, India to Saudamini (née Nilkanth) and Gaganvihari Lallubhai Mehta. Her father was a member of the first Planning Commission of India and later became India's Ambassador to the United States. Her mother, Saudamini, was a social worker who was president of AIWC Calcutta and president of Harijan Sevak Sangh. Basu had her school education in Calcutta. She received a B.A. Honors degree from Elphinstone College, Bombay University. She went on to earn a second B.A., an M.A., and a Ph.D. in history from Newnham College, University of Cambridge. She also earned an M.A. from George Washington University, Washington D.C.

== Career ==
Basu worked at the MIT Center for International Studies, Lady Shri Ram College, Delhi University, Elphinstone College, and Jadavpur University in Calcutta. She joined the history department of Delhi University as a reader in 1970, and later became professor of modern history and retired as head of the department. Basu was a founding member of the Indian Association of Women's Studies and of the International Federation for Research in Women's History. She served multiple roles in the All India Women's Conference (AIWC), including president (2002–2004). During her time at AIWC, spoke on child labor issues in India and women's rights. From 2013 until the time of her death in 2018, she served as Chairperson, National Gandhi Museum, New Delhi. She also served as chair of the All India Association for the Eradication of Illiteracy of Women, which runs centers in several parts of India for imparting functional literacy to women.

Basu was known for her work on the history of education and women's history in India.

== Selected publications ==
- Basu, Aparna (1974). The growth of education and political development in India, 1898–1920. Delhi: Oxford University Press. ISBN 0-19-560352-4. OCLC 1176565.
- Basu, Aparna (1982). Essays in the history of Indian education. OCLC 9643874.
- Bharati, Ray; Basu, Aparna (1999). From independence towards freedom : Indian women since 1947. New Delhi: Oxford University Press. ISBN 0-19-564575-8. OCLC 41368549.
- Basu, Aparna (2003). Women's struggle : a history of the All India Women's Conference, 1927–2002. Bharati Ray (2nd ed.). New Delhi: Manohar. ISBN 81-7304-476-7. OCLC 52899325.
- Basu, Aparna (2003). Mridula Sarabhai : rebel with a cause. Delhi: Oxford University Press. ISBN 0-19-566794-8. OCLC 54003876.
