= Jitender Pal Singh =

Indian diplomat and Ambassador of India to Israel

His Excellency Jitender Pal Singh IFS
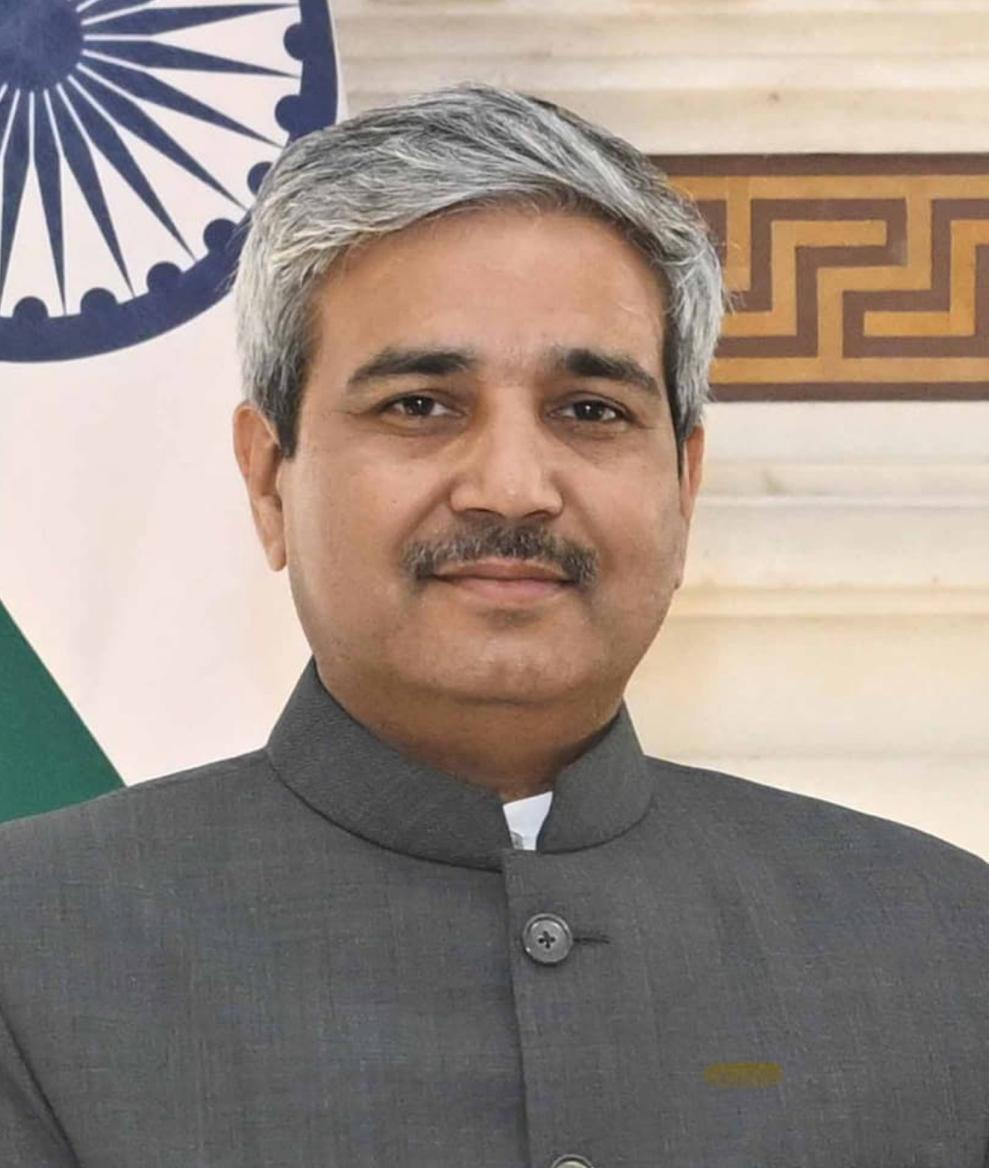
- J.P. Singh in 2025

Ambassador of India to Israel
- Incumbent
- Assumed office January 2025
- President: Droupadi Murmu
- Prime Minister: Narendra Modi
- Preceded by: Sanjeev Singla

Consul General of India in Istanbul, Turkey
- In office 2019–2020
- President: Ram Nath Kovind
- Prime Minister: Narendra Modi
- Preceded by: Azar A.H. Khan
- Succeeded by: Sudhi Choudhary

Deputy High Commissioner of India to Pakistan
- In office 2014–2019
- President: Pranab Mukherjee; Ram Nath Kovind
- Prime Minister: Narendra Modi

Personal details
- Born: Jitender Pal Singh India
- Spouse: Married
- Children: 1 (son)
- Occupation: Civil servant; Diplomat
- Rank: Joint Secretary

Jitender Pal Singh, commonly referred to as J. P. Singh, is an Indian diplomat from the 2002 batch of the Indian Foreign Service. He is currently serving as the Ambassador of India to Israel. He has held several senior diplomatic and policy positions in India and abroad, particularly dealing with Pakistan, Afghanistan, Iran, Russia and Turkey.

== Early life and education ==
Jitender Pal Singh was born in India. He is a postgraduate in Sociology. He qualified the Civil Services Examination and joined the Indian Foreign Service in 2002.

== Diplomatic career ==
=== Third Secretary in Moscow, Russia ===
After joining the Indian Foreign Service, Singh completed his training from LBSNAA in Mussoorie and SSIFS in New Delhi, he went to Moscow for the Russian language training in Moscow State University as a Third Secretary in Russia.

=== Second Secretary in Moscow, Russia ===
His early overseas postings included service at the Embassy of India in Moscow from 2004 to 2006.

=== First Secretary in Kabul, Afghanistan ===
During 2008 to 2012 he was posted at the Embassy of India in Kabul, where he served in different diplomatic capacities. During his tenure in Kabul, he survived the terrorist attack on the Indian Embassy in Kabul in 2008.

=== Deputy High Commissioner to Pakistan ===
From 2014 to 2019, Singh served as the Deputy High Commissioner of India to Pakistan, based in Islamabad, handling key aspects of India–Pakistan bilateral relations, including the diplomatic fallout from major cross‑border terror incidents and tensions such as the 2016 Uri attack and 2019 Pulwama attack. He also assisted Indian nationals in distress, including the high-profile Uzma Ahmed case.

=== Consul General of India in Istanbul, Turkey ===
He was subsequently appointed as the Consul General of India in Istanbul, Turkey, serving from 2019 to 2020.

=== Joint Secretary in PAI (Pakistan-Afghanistan-Iran) Division, MEA, New Delhi ===
At the Ministry of External Affairs in New Delhi, Singh worked in the Europe West Division and served as Officer on Special Duty in the External Publicity Division. From 2020 to 2025, he served as Joint Secretary in the Pakistan–Afghanistan–Iran (PAI) Division, where he was responsible for policy formulation and diplomatic engagement relating to India’s relations with Pakistan, Afghanistan and Iran. During this period, he was also involved in cautious outreach and engagement related to evolving developments in neighbouring Afghanistan, contributing to India’s evolving diplomatic presence there and laying groundwork for re-establishing the full diplomatic mission in 2025.

He also served as the Chief of Staff to the External Affairs Minister S. Jaishankar from 2024 to 2025.

=== Operation Ganga ===
During the Russia–Ukraine conflict in 2022, he was deployed to Sumy along with fellow diplomat G. Balasubramanian to assist in the rescue of Indian students under Operation Ganga, operating in the midst of the warzone.

=== Ambassador of India to Israel ===
In January 2025, Jitender Pal Singh was appointed as the Ambassador of India to Israel.

His tenure has coincided with close strategic, political and security cooperation between India and Israel. During this period, Singh has overseen India’s diplomatic engagement during the Iran–Israel war, with New Delhi calling for restraint and de-escalation while maintaining balanced relations with both sides.

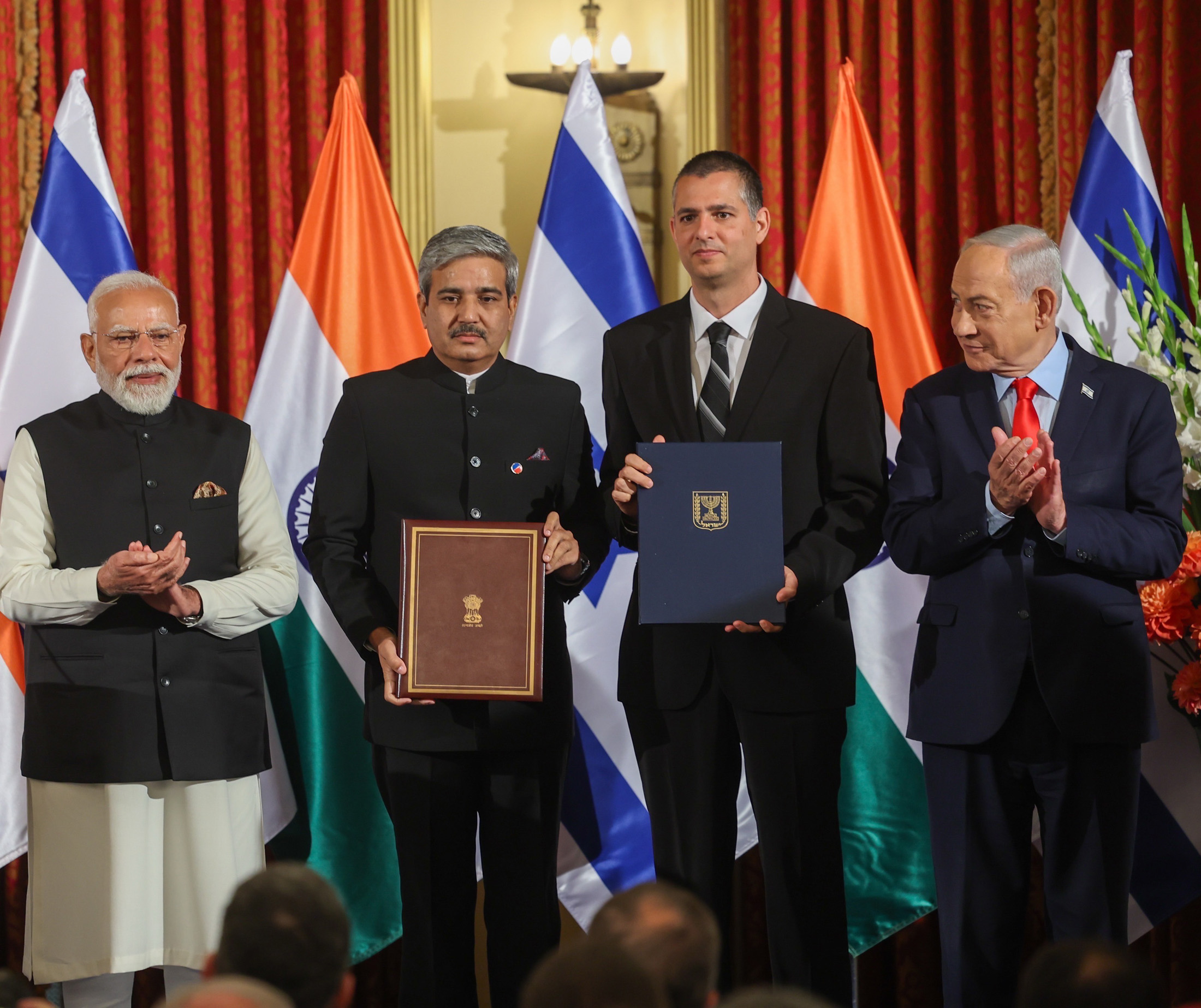
Prime Minister of India Narendra Modi and the Prime Minister of Israel Benjamin Netanyahu witnessing the Exchange of MoUs between India and Israel on February 26, 2026; Ambassador J.P. Singh is standing to the left of PM Modi

During his tenure, on 25 February 2026, Prime Minister of India Narendra Modi visited Israel after nine years and met Benjamin Netanyahu, where he also addressed the Knesset.

Both sides discussed expanding cooperation in areas such as defence technology, cybersecurity, agriculture technology and innovation, and signed a Special Strategic Partnership.

Following the visit, tensions in the 2026 Iran war escalated from 28 February when Iran launched attacks against Israel and military bases of the United States in the United Arab Emirates, Saudi Arabia, Qatar, Bahrain and Kuwait.

The Government of India condemned the attacks and called for restraint in the Middle East. The Indian Embassy in Tel-Aviv also issued an advisory urging the Indian diaspora and citizens in Israel to remain vigilant and follow instructions from local authorities.

== Personal life ==
Jitender Pal Singh is married, and the couple have a son. He speaks English, Hindi and Russian. He is known to maintain a low public profile.

== In popular culture ==
- In the film The Diplomat, the character of J. P. Singh was portrayed by John Abraham. The film depicts his role in the Uzma Ahmed case and his management of India–Pakistan tensions.

== See also ==
- Indian Foreign Service
- India–Israel relations
- Ministry of External Affairs
- List of ambassadors and high commissioners of India
