= Embassy of India, Moscow =

Diplomatic mission of India in Russia

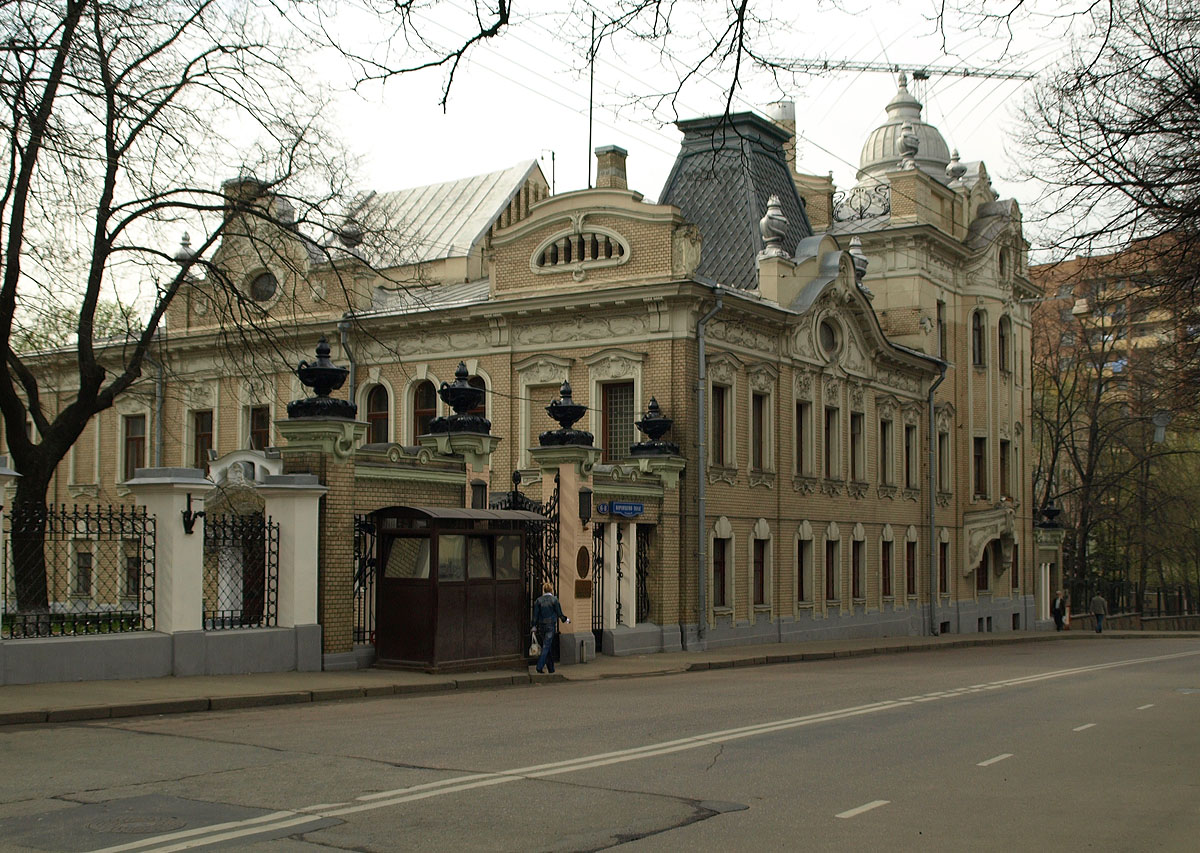
- Embassy of India, Moscow
- Location: Moscow, Russia
- Address: 6-8, Ulitsa Vorontsovo Polye
- Coordinates: 55°45′10.2″N 37°39′00″E
- Ambassador: Vinay Kumar
- Website: Official website

The Embassy of India in Moscow is the diplomatic mission of the Republic of India to the Russian Federation. It is headed by the Indian Ambassador to Russia, currently Vinay Kumar. India maintains several diplomatic missions in Russia, including the Consulate General of India in Saint Petersburg, and the Consulate General of India in Vladivostok. Additionally, in July 2024, Prime Minister Narendra Modi announced plans to open new Indian consulates in Kazan and Yekaterinburg to further enhance travel and trade between India and Russia.

== History ==
The Embassy of India in Moscow (Hindi: मॉस्को में भारत का दूतावास; Russian: Посольство Индии в России) was built in 1821, remodeled in 1896, and transferred to the Indian government in 1952 to serve as the official embassy. The embassy complex comprises multiple buildings, including the aristocratic-style "Chancery Building," the rational-modern style ambassador's residence, and a French-style building known as "Napoleon's Dacha." The Chancery Building was previously owned by an arts patron, a textile magnate, and the Soviet government before being transferred to India in 1952.

India and the former Soviet Union established diplomatic relations in 1947. Since then, the Indian Embassy in Moscow has played a key role in strengthening bilateral ties, particularly in defense, trade, and cultural exchange.

== Functions ==
The Embassy provides various consular services, including visa processing, passport renewals, and assistance for Indian citizens residing or traveling in Russia. It also facilitates diplomatic engagements, trade relations, and cultural programs between India and Russia.

== See also ==
- India–Russia relations
- Embassy of India School Moscow
- List of diplomatic missions of India
- List of diplomatic missions in Russia
