= A Historical Atlas of Tibet =

2015 atlas and a topographical book by Karl E. Ryavec

- Author: Karl E. Ryavec
- Language: English
- Subject: Anthropology; Geography
- Genre: Nonfiction
- Published: May 2015
- Publisher: University of Chicago Press
- Publication place: United States
- Media type: Hardcover
- Pages: 216
- ISBN: 978-0226732442

A Historical Atlas of Tibet is an atlas and a topographical book by Karl E. Ryavec.

== Overview ==
From the Paleolithic and Neolithic periods up to the present day (2015), this book documents the cultural and religious sites that can be found across the Tibetan Plateau and the regions that border it. It talks about the five most important times in Tibetan history and gives 49 maps and information about Tibetan areas in the west, the middle, and the east.

== Reception ==
Writing for the Geographical Review, Emily T. Yeh, professor of geography at the University of Colorado Boulder suggests that the book "[The book] is a stunning achievement. Gorgeously designed, with forty-nine original maps and many more photographs of artwork, temples, and historical and contemporary landscapes."

In a review for Himalayan Journal, Christian Jahoda of Austrian Academy of Sciences writes, "What makes this book so valuable and unique is, first, the fact that the focus is on Tibet as a cultural and linguistic realm in its own right. Second, it is neither reduced to the confines of the Tibet Autonomous Region in the People's Republic of China nor to Tibetan-speaking populations in adjacent Chinese territories (that is, in addition to TAR, Qinghai, Gansu, Sichuan, and Yunnan), but includes areas and sites in northwestern India, northern China, Mongolia, and Beijing. Third, the author’s methodological approach, basing the maps for the whole historical period largely on a database of religious sites (approximately 2,925 Buddhist and Bonpo temples and monasteries), is comprehensible on account of the interrelationships between densities of temples and monasteries and socio-economic patterns, such as forms of land use, trade routes, etc... Fourth, the maps offer an unprecedented opportunity to study the development of certain macroregions, particularly in terms of their religious and political affiliations, over more or less long historical period."

Tim Chamberlain, a doctoral candidate at Birkbeck, University of London wrote in his review for the London School of Economics, "As the first historical atlas specifically centred on Tibet, this book will undoubtedly come to serve as an invaluable basic reference work for both students and established scholars across a wide array of academic disciplines. It will be of essential use to historians, anthropologists, historical geographers, digital cartographers, archaeologists and scholars of religion and other aspects of Tibetan culture and society."

Nirupama Rao, former Indian diplomat writes in India Today, "...historical Tibet is juxtaposed against a present that is geo-political rather than the geo-civilisational is clear throughout this work."
