= Raminder Jassal =

Indian diplomat (died 2011)

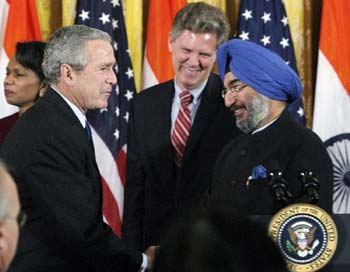
- President Bush shakes hands with Jassal after signing of the United States-India Peaceful Atomic Energy Cooperation Act, Dec. 18, 2006

Official Spokesperson of the Ministry of External Affairs
- In office 1999–2001
- Preceded by: Krishan Chander Singh
- Succeeded by: Nirupama Rao

Ambassador of India to Israel
- In office 2002–2005
- Preceded by: Ranjan Mathai
- Succeeded by: Arun Kumar Singh

Raminder Singh Jassal was an Indian diplomat who served as India's Ambassador to Israel, the United States, and Turkey. He also served as India's spokesman during the 1999 Kargil War between India and Pakistan.

== Early career ==
Jassal joined the Indian Foreign Service in 1976 after graduating from Delhi University. His first assignment was at the Embassy of India in Moscow where he learned and became fluent in Russian. He was First Secretary at Warsaw between 1981 and 1984 serving for a period as Charge d’affaires.

He served in various roles such as Deputy Secretary in the Americas Division in the Ministry of External Affairs between 1985 and 1988, Political Counselor at the Embassy of India, Washington, D.C. and between 1991 and 1995 he served as Political Counselor at the Embassy of India in Moscow. In 1995 he served briefly as Director (West Africa, North Africa) in the Ministry of External Affairs, New Delhi and later as Joint Secretary (Central Asia) during 1996–1997, and later Joint Secretary (Planning & Coordination) in the Ministry of Defence where he served between 1997 and 1999.

== Spokesperson and ambassador ==
He was then named to be the official Spokesperson of the Ministry of External Affairs where he served with distinction from 1999 to 2001. In that capacity he also handled media arrangements for all official foreign visits of the Prime Minister of India and all incoming state and official visits including those of President Clinton to India in March 2000 and Prime Minister Vajpayee to Washington D.C. in September, 2000.

He served as India's Ambassador to Israel from 2001 to 2004. During this period relations between India and Israel progressed. As Deputy Chief of Mission and Charge d'affaires in Washington, D.C., Jassal was one of the lead negotiators of the civil nuclear deal between the United States and India. He took up his position as India's Ambassador in Ankara in 2008.

== Death ==
In 2009, he was diagnosed with a lymphoma. On 11 March 2011, while undergoing treatment in a Turkish hospital in Ankara, he died of complications from a round of chemotherapy. The Turkish government flew Jassal's remains in a military aircraft back to New Delhi.

== Personal life ==
Ambassador Jassal was married to Professor Smita Tewari Jassal, a professor at Johns Hopkins University.
