= Pavan Kapoor =

Indian diplomat and Deputy National Security Advisor of India

Pavan Kapoor IFS
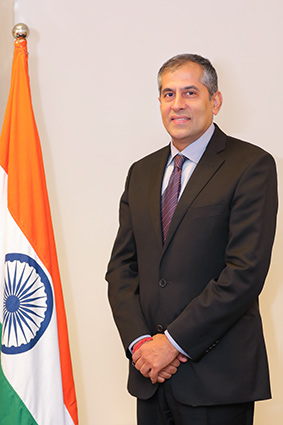

Deputy National Security Advisor of India
- Incumbent
- Assumed office 15 July 2024
- Prime Minister: Narendra Modi
- Preceded by: Vikram Misri

Secretary (West), Ministry of External Affairs, India
- In office 4 February 2024 – 14 July 2024
- Preceded by: Sanjay Verma
- Succeeded by: Tanmay Lal

Ambassador of India to the Russian Federation
- In office 21 November 2021 – 3 February 2024
- Prime Minister: Narendra Modi
- Preceded by: D. Bala Venkatesh Varma
- Succeeded by: Vinay Kumar

Ambassador of India to the United Arab Emirates
- In office October 2019 – November 2021
- Preceded by: Navdeep Singh Suri
- Succeeded by: Sunjay Sudhir

Ambassador of India to Israel
- In office March 2016 – September 2019
- Preceded by: Jaideep Sarkar
- Succeeded by: Sanjeev Singla

High Commissioner of India to Mozambique
- In office 2004–2006

Personal details
- Born: 24 December 1966 (age 59) India
- Spouse: Aradhana Sharma
- Education: (MBA) IIM Ahmedabad (MSc) London School of Economics and Political Science
- Occupation: Diplomat
- Website: https://indianembassy-moscow.gov.in/

Pavan Kapoor (born 24 December 1966) is an Indian diplomat from the 1990 batch of the Indian Foreign Service who is serving as the Deputy National Security advisor of India since 2024. He has previously served as the Secretary (West) in the Ministry of External Affairs, and as the Indian Ambassador to Russia, Israel, UAE and Mozambique.

== Career ==
Pavan Kapoor joined the Indian Foreign Service in 1990. In his diplomatic career, he has served in different Indian Missions abroad, the Ministry of External Affairs, and the Prime Minister's Office in New Delhi. He also served as an international civil servant with the Commonwealth Secretariat in London.

== Personal life ==
Pavan Kapoor is married to Aradhana Sharma, who is a freelance journalist. He completed an MBA from IIM Ahmedabad and a MSc from London School of Economics.

== See also ==
- Vijay Gokhale
- Dr. S Jaishankar
- Navtej Sarna
