= SAAN =

SAAN may refer to:

- San people or Bushmen, the indigenous people of Southern Africa
- SAAN (department store), a defunct chain of discount department stores in Canada
- South Asian Awareness Network, a service organization in the United States

== See also ==
- Saane, a river in Switzerland
- Saâne, a river in France
- SAN (disambiguation)
