= Jassal =

Jassal is a surname that comes from northern India. Notable people with the surname include:

- Kiran Jassal (born 1996), Malaysian model and beauty pageant titleholder
- Raminder Jassal (died 2011), Indian diplomat
