= 2007 Delhi security summit =

The Delhi summit on security took place on February 14, 2007, with the foreign ministers of China, India, and Russia meeting in Hyderabad House, Delhi, India to discuss terrorism, drug trafficking, reform of the United Nations, and the security situations in Afghanistan, Iran, Iraq, and North Korea.

The Indian Foreign Ministry released a statement on behalf of all three governments saying, "We shared our thoughts on the political, economic and security aspects of the global situation, the present world order and recent developments in various areas of mutual concern. We agreed that co-operation rather than confrontation should govern approaches to regional and global affairs. There was coincidence of views against terrorism in all its forms and manifestations and on the need to address financing of terrorism and its linkages with narco-trafficking."

Li Zhaoxing of China and Pranab Mukherjee of India negotiated over air links, visa restrictions, disputes over shared rivers, and the China-India border.

Representatives also spoke about China's recent missile test. Nirupama Rao, India's ambassador to China, said Zhaoxing "stressed that China was against the weaponization and militarization of outer space and that the test conducted, according to them, was of a purely technological and scientific nature."

Russian foreign ministry spokesman Mikhail Kamynin said, "As Russia's relations... with China grew deeper, India–China relations are normalized and Beijing and New Delhi manifested mounting interest in contacts with Russia in tripartite format on a wide range of matters of mutual interest."

C. Uday Bhaskar from the New Delhi–based Institute for Defence and Strategic Analyses said, "energy cooperation would be a big ticket item on the talks agenda."

Mukherjee said, "We also agreed on the importance of the UN and that there was a need to make it more effective so that it reflects contemporary global realities."

Sergey Lavrov, the Russian Foreign Minister, said, "We discussed most burning issues of world politics and had a broad approach on many international issues."

After the summit representatives for China and Russia said they support India's campaign for membership in the United Nations Security Council.
