= List of Indians detained and searched at United States airports =

Since 2001, several cases of detention and search of Indian VIPs at US airports have been reported, resulting in diplomatic tensions between India and the United States. Protest from Indian authorities often led to apologies from US officials. Unlike the United States, India frequently exempts diplomats and other well-known figures from airport security checks.

Shah Rukh Khan experienced three well-publicised incidents of this type. On 15 August 2009, he was detained at Newark while on his way to celebrate India's Independence Day in Chicago. Three years later, he was stopped at New York White Plains where he had landed to address a conference at Yale University. Four years later again, he was stopped at Los Angeles International Airport.

In December 2010, Indian Ambassador to the United States Meera Shankar and to the United Nations Hardeep Singh Puri were both targeted by security agents in two separate incidents. In September 2011, former President of India A. P. J. Abdul Kalam was searched twice – before and after boarding his plane – at New York JFK airport, previously in 2009 he had been searched by the ground staff of a Continental Airlines flight in New Delhi which was bound for Newark.

In 2015, it was announced that a list of 2,000 Indian VIPs will be included in the US Global Entry programme, which warrants expedited clearance at US airports. The list was to include former Presidents and Prime Ministers, prominent industrialists and well-known actors.

Date	Name	Occupation	Airport	Type	Source
September 2001	Kabir Khan	Film director	Los Angeles International	Search	
2002	Aamir Khan	Film actor	Chicago O'Hare	Search	
2002	George Fernandes	Minister of Defence	Washington Dulles	Search	
2003	George Fernandes	Minister of Defence	Washington Dulles	Search	
2008	Irrfan Khan	Film actor	Los Angeles International	Detention	
2009	Irrfan Khan	Film actor	New York JFK	Detention	
2009	John Abraham	Film actor	New York JFK	Detention	
May 2009	Mammootty	Film actor	New York JFK	Detention	
June 2009	Neil Nitin Mukesh	Film actor	New York JFK	Detention	
August 2009	Shah Rukh Khan	Film actor	Newark	Detention	
September 2010	Praful Patel	Minister of Civil Aviation	Chicago O'Hare	Detention	
December 2010	Meera Shankar	Ambassador to the US	Jackson–Evers	Search	
December 2010	Hardeep Singh Puri	Permanent Representative to the UN	Houston	Detention	
September 2011	A. P. J. Abdul Kalam	Former President of India	New York JFK	Search	
April 2012	Shah Rukh Khan	Film actor	New York White Plains	Detention	
2013	Azam Khan	Politician	Boston Logan	Detention	
August 2016	Shah Rukh Khan	Film actor	Los Angeles International	Detention	

== See also ==
- Kamal Haasan, Indian actor denied preclearance to travel to the United States by Customs and Border Protection authorities at Toronto Pearson International Airport in 2002 because of his Muslim-sounding name.
