= South Asian Awareness Network =

Nonprofit organization

- Abbreviation: SAAN
- Formation: 2001
- Type: South Asian Advocacy Organization
- Location: North America
- Chairs: Eman Mubarak and Shobhana Panuganti
- Website: http://saanatum.com

The South Asian Awareness Network, almost always referred to by its initialism SAAN and pronounced sān, is a non-profit group at the University of Michigan which holds one of the most prominent conferences on South Asian issues for undergraduate students in North America. Its mission goals include "educating participants and raising awareness about issues affecting South Asians that are often overlooked or not discussed, inspiring young South Asians to become leaders by promoting activism, encouraging unity, and maintaining a network of South Asians in across the nation."

SAAN was founded in 2001 by several University of Michigan students who felt that there was great demand on campus for a content-driven conference on issues of importance to the South Asian community in America ranging from humanitarian work in South Asia to increased political participation in the United States. From the initial conference in 2001 which was a campus-only affair, the SAAN conference has grown into a nationally renowned conference which draws over 500 participants annually from across America. Speakers from past conferences have included CNN Medical Correspondent Sanjay Gupta, Pepsi CEO Indra Nooyi, actor and White House spokesperson Kal Penn, and Trinity College professor Vijay Prashad, comedian Hari Kondabolu, The Daily Show correspondent Hasan Minhaj, former Michigan congressman Hansen Clarke, and former Indian Ambassador to the United States Arun Kumar Singh.
