= List of ambassadors of India to Israel =

Ambassador of India to Israel
- Incumbent; J. P. Singh, IFS since January 2025
- Nominator: President of India
- Formation: 1992
- Website: Embassy of India, Tel Aviv, Israel

The Indian ambassador to Israel is the chief diplomatic representative of India to Israel, housed in Tel Aviv.

== List of Indian Ambassadors to Israel ==
List of Indian Ambassadors to Israel

Name	Entered office	Left office
Pradeep Kumar Singh	29 October 1992	1995
Shivshankar Menon	1995	1998
Ranjan Mathai	1998	2002
Raminder Jassal	2002	2005
Arun Kumar Singh	2005	2008
Navtej Sarna	2008	2012
Jaideep Sarkar	2012	2016
Pavan Kapoor	2016	2019
Sanjeev Singla	October 2019	2024
J. P. Singh	2025	Incumbent
