= D. Bala Venkatesh Varma =

Indian diplomat (born 1961)

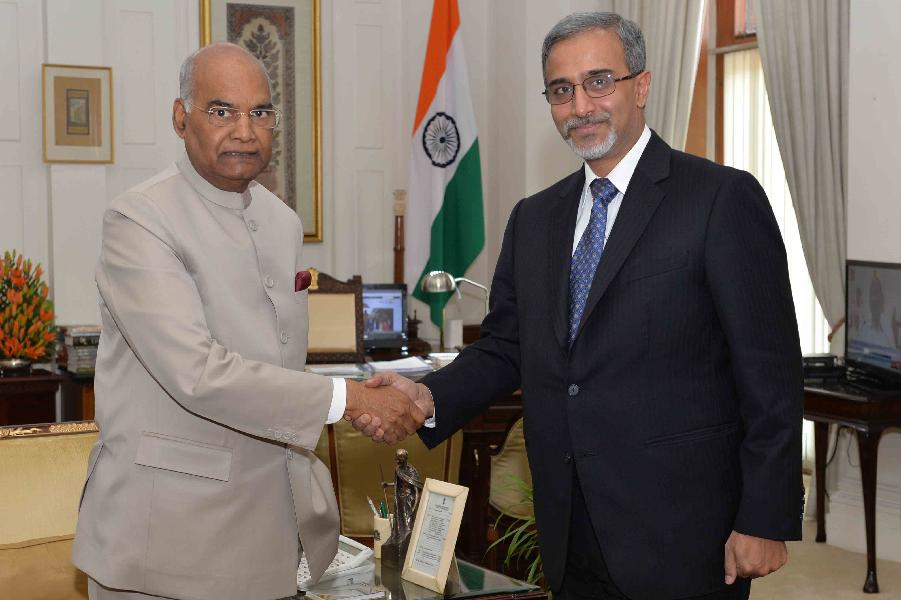
- D.B. Venkatesh Verma meeting with the President of India, Ram Nath Kovind

Ambassador of India to Russia
- In office 2019–2021
- Preceded by: Pankaj Saran
- Succeeded by: Pavan Kapoor

Ambassador of India to Spain
- In office 2017–2019
- Succeeded by: Sanjay Verma

Personal details
- Born: October 16, 1961 (age 64)
- Education: Nizam College; Osmania University; Jawaharlal Nehru University

D. Bala Venkatesh Varma is a retired Indian diplomat of Indian Foreign Service who served as the Ambassador of India to Russia from 2019 toq 2021.

== Education ==
He studied at the Hyderabad Public School. He completed a BA from Nizam College in 1982. Varma has an MPhil from the Jawaharlal Nehru University.

== Career ==
He joined the Indian Foreign Service in 1988. Between 2004 and 2007, he worked at the Prime Minister's Office and was part of the Indian negotiating team during the negotiations for the India–United States Civil Nuclear Agreement.

In 2017, he was appointed the Indian envoy to Spain.

In 2019, he was appointed the Indian envoy to Russia. Varma oversaw the assistance to Indian nationals during the COVID-19 pandemic. He retired in 2021.

== Awards ==
In 2010, he received the S. K. Singh Award.

== Personal life ==
Varma is married and has one daughter.
