= M. C. Chagla =

Indian jurist, diplomat and Cabinet Minister

Mahommedali Currim Chagla
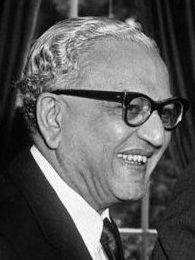
- Chagla in 1961

Union Minister of External Affairs
- In office 14 November 1966 – 5 September 1967
- Prime Minister: Indira Gandhi
- Preceded by: Swaran Singh
- Succeeded by: Indira Gandhi

Union Minister of Education
- In office 21 November 1963 – 13 November 1966
- Prime Minister: Jawaharlal Nehru; Gulzarilal Nanda (Interim); Lal Bahadur Shastri; Indira Gandhi
- Preceded by: Humayun Kabir
- Succeeded by: Fakhruddin Ali Ahmed

High Commissioner of India to the United Kingdom
- In office April 1962 – September 1963
- Prime Minister: Jawaharlal Nehru
- Preceded by: Vijaya Lakshmi Pandit
- Succeeded by: Jivraj Narayan Mehta

Ambassador of India to the United States
- In office 1958–1961
- Prime Minister: Jawaharlal Nehru
- Preceded by: Gaganvihari Lallubhai Mehta
- Succeeded by: B. K. Nehru

Chief Justice of Bombay High Court
- In office 1947 - 1958
- Succeeded by: Hashmatrai Khubchand Chainani

Personal details
- Born: 30 September 1900 Bombay, Bombay Presidency, British India
- Died: 9 February 1981 (aged 80)
- Party: Indian National Congress
- Education: Lincoln College, Oxford

Mahommedali Currim Chagla (30 September 1900 – 9 February 1981) was an Indian jurist, diplomat, and Cabinet Minister who served as Chief Justice of the Bombay High Court from 1947 to 1958.

== Early life and education ==
Born on 30 September 1900 in Bombay to a well-off Gujarati, Ismaili Khoja family, Chagla suffered a lonely childhood owing to his mother's death in 1905. His childhood was spent in their family mansion near Nagdevi Street and Janjiker Lane, Khokha Bazar in Pydhonie. He later bought a mansion in Malabar Hill in 1934.

He was educated at St. Xavier's High School and College in Bombay, after which he went on to study Modern History at Lincoln College, Oxford, from 1918 to 1921, taking a BA in 1921 and MA in 1925. In 1922, he was admitted to the Bar of the Bombay High Court, where he worked with such illuminaries as Sir Jamshedji Kanga and Mohammed Ali Jinnah.

== Career ==
Chagla was appointed Professor of law at the Government Law College, Bombay in 1927, where he worked with Dr. B.R. Ambedkar. He was appointed a judge to Bombay High Court in 1941, becoming Chief Justice in 1948 and serving in that capacity to 1958. All through, he continued to write and speak strongly for the Indian freedom cause and against the communal two nation ideology.

In 1946, Chagla was part of the first Indian delegation to the UN. From 4 October to 10 December 1956, Chagla served as Acting Governor of the then state of Bombay, later broken up into the states of Gujarat and Maharashtra. Following his tenure as Chief Justice, he served as the one-man commission that examined the Finance Minister of India, T. T. Krishnamachari, over the controversial Haridas Mundhra LIC insurance scandal, which forced Krishnamachari's resignation as Finance Minister. Krishnamachari was quite close to Nehru, who became intensely angry at Chagla for his revelations of TTK's part in the affair, though he later forgave Chagla. From September 1957 to 1959, Chagla served as ad hoc judge to the International Court of Justice at The Hague. After retirement he served as Indian ambassador to the US from 1958 to 1961. Chagla then served as Indian High Commissioner in the UK from April 1962 to September 1963. Immediately on his return, he was asked to be a Cabinet Minister, which he accepted, and he served as Education Minister from 1963 to 1966, then served as the Minister for External Affairs of India from November 1966 to September 1967, after which he left government service. He then spent the remaining years of his life actively, continuing to practice law into his seventies.

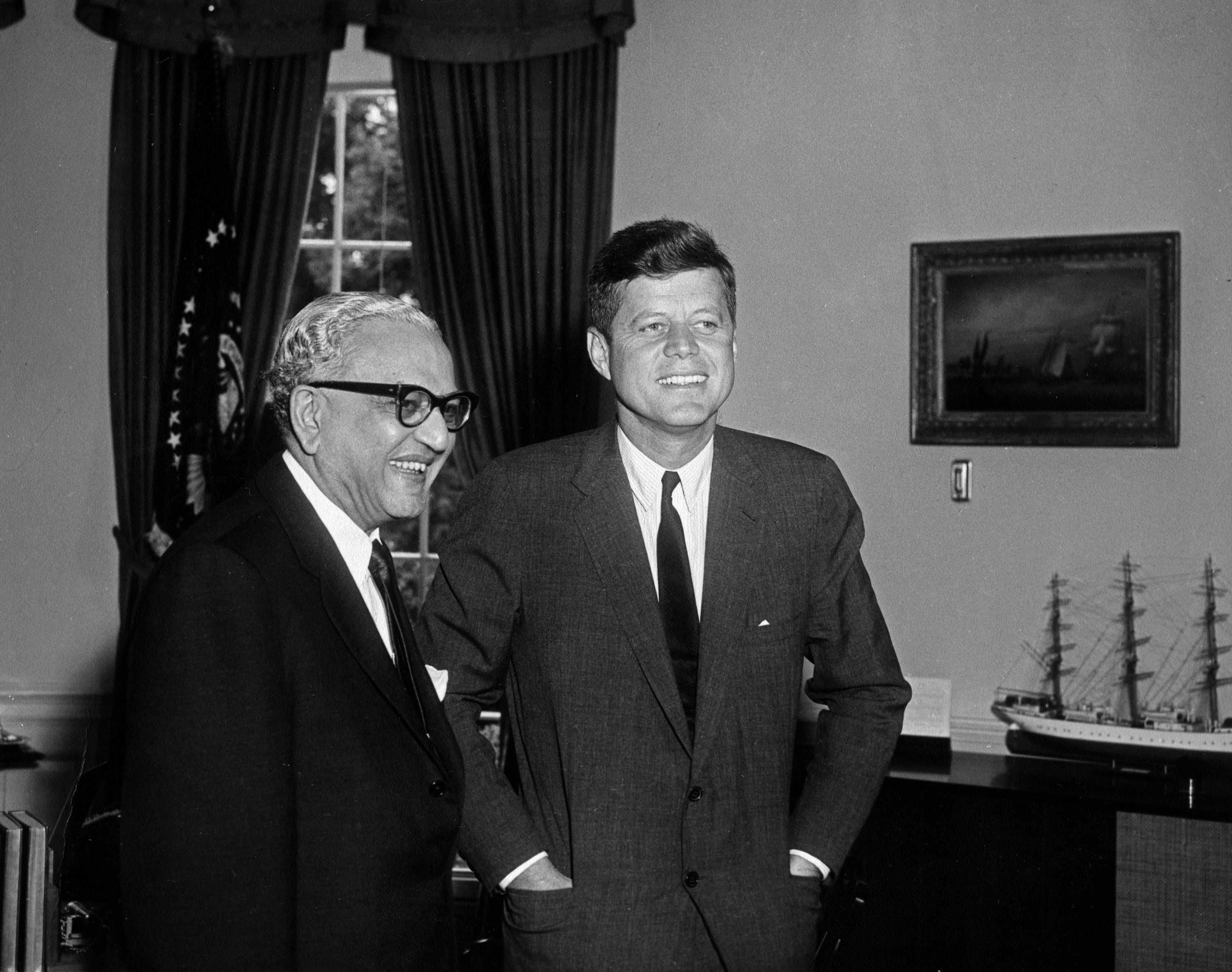
Chagla (left), as Ambassador to the United States, with President John F. Kennedy at the White House, 22 May 1961.

As Minister of Education under Jawaharlal Nehru, Chagla was distraught by the quality of education in government schools:

Our Constitution fathers did not intend that we just set up hovels, put students there, give untrained teachers, give them bad textbooks, no playgrounds, and say, we have complied with Article 45 and primary education is expanding... They meant that real education should be given to our children between the ages of 6 and 14

== Personal life and family ==
In 1930, Chagla married Mehrunissa Dharsi Jivraj, a lady of his own community and similar family background. Their marriage was harmonious and conventional. The couple had four children, two sons, Jehangir (b. 1934) and Iqbal (1939 – 2025) and two daughters, Husnara (b. 1932) and Nuru (b. 193x). Their son Iqbal Chagla became a lawyer; with his wife Roshan, he has a daughter (M.C. Chagla's granddaughter) Rohiqa, who is the widow of Cyrus Mistry, the former chairman of Tata Sons in the period 2014–2016. Iqbal's son Riyaz (b. c. 1970) was appointed a judge of the Bombay High Court in July 2017.

Chagla's younger daughter, Nuru, married Subbaram Swaminathan, a south Indian Hindu gentleman, son of politician Ammu Swaminathan and brother of captain Lakshmi Swaminathan and Mrinalini Sarabhai.

Mehrunissa Dharsi Jivraj died in November 1961. Chagla survived her by nineteen years, dying in February 1981.

== Last years and death ==
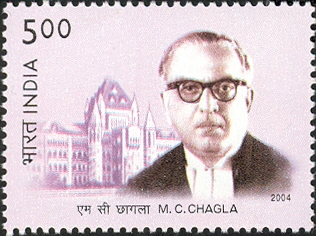
Chagla on a 2004 stamp of India

In 1973, Chagla published his autobiography, Roses in December, with the help of his son Iqbal. He vehemently protested against the Indian Emergency. He died on 9 February 1981, at the age of 80 of heart failure. He had been unwell for several years, and had suffered four heart attacks. True to his active and energetic nature, he had not let his health slow him down. On the day of his death, he went as usual to his club in Bombay and had a good time with his friends. He then slipped away to the dressing room and there, peacefully died. According to his wish, he was cremated instead of having a traditional Muslim burial. The Bombay High Court was closed to show respect for him, and several speeches were made in his memory, including one by later Prime Minister, Atal Bihari Vajpayee.

In 1985, a statue of Chagla was unveiled and placed within the High Court outside the Chief Justice's Court where he once served. The inscription on the statue plinth reads:

"A great judge, a great citizen, and, above all, a great human being."

== Further facts ==
Though born a Muslim, Chagla was more of an agnostic.

The surname "Chagla" was not his original surname. In Chagla's autobiography, he recounted that in his youth, he was known as "Merchant" as both his father and grandfather were merchants. Hating the name due to its associations with money, he went to his grandfather one day and asked him as to what he should call himself. His grandfather promptly replied "Chagla" as his father, Chagla's great-grandfather, had had Chagla as his pet name, which in the [Sindhi] language means "favourite". Chagla promptly adopted the new surname.

Political offices
Preceded by Sardar Swaran Singh	Minister for External Affairs of India; 1966–1967	Succeeded by Indira Gandhi
Diplomatic posts
Preceded by Gaganvihari Lallubhai Mehta	Indian Ambassador to the United States; 1958–1961	Succeeded by B.K. Nehru
Preceded by Vijaya Lakshmi Pandit	High Commissioner of India to the United Kingdom; 1962 - 1963	Succeeded by Jivraj Narayan Mehta
Legal offices
Preceded by Leonard Stone	Chief Justice of the Bombay High Court; 1948-1958	Succeeded by Hashmatrai Khubchand Chainani
