= Crimson Spring =

2022 novel by Navtej Sarna

- Book cover
- Author: Navtej Sarna
- Language: English
- Subject: Jallianwala Bagh massacre
- Genre: Historical fiction
- Publisher: Aleph Book Company
- Publication date: 2022
- Publication place: India
- Media type: Print

Crimson Spring is a 2022 historical novel by Indian writer and diplomat Navtej Sarna. It is set around the Jallianwala Bagh massacre of 13 April 1919 and its aftermath. The novel is told from the perspectives of nine characters, including British officials, Indian soldiers and revolutionaries. Aleph Book Company published the novel. It was longlisted for the JCB Prize for Literature, and won the author the 2025 Sahitya Akademi Award for English.

== Plot ==
The novel is set in Amritsar around the Jallianwala Bagh massacre. Its characters include Lieutenant Governor Michael O'Dwyer, Brigadier General Reginald Dyer, the soldier Kirpal Singh and the revolutionary Udham Singh. The story also deals with the Ghadar movement through the character Sucha Singh, placing the events in Amritsar within the wider history of Punjab and the Indian independence movement.

Sarna has said that he used fictional characters to portray the experiences of people living through the period while keeping the historical events and facts on which the novel is based.

== Reception ==
A review in The Tribune praised the novel for combining its historical account with the grief, trauma and anger experienced by its characters. The review described the massacre through the experiences of ordinary people and discussed the changes taking place in Punjab's political and social life at the time. It also noted the novel's treatment of the Ghadar movement and its place in the Indian independence struggle.
