= Arun Kumar Singh =

Indian diplomat

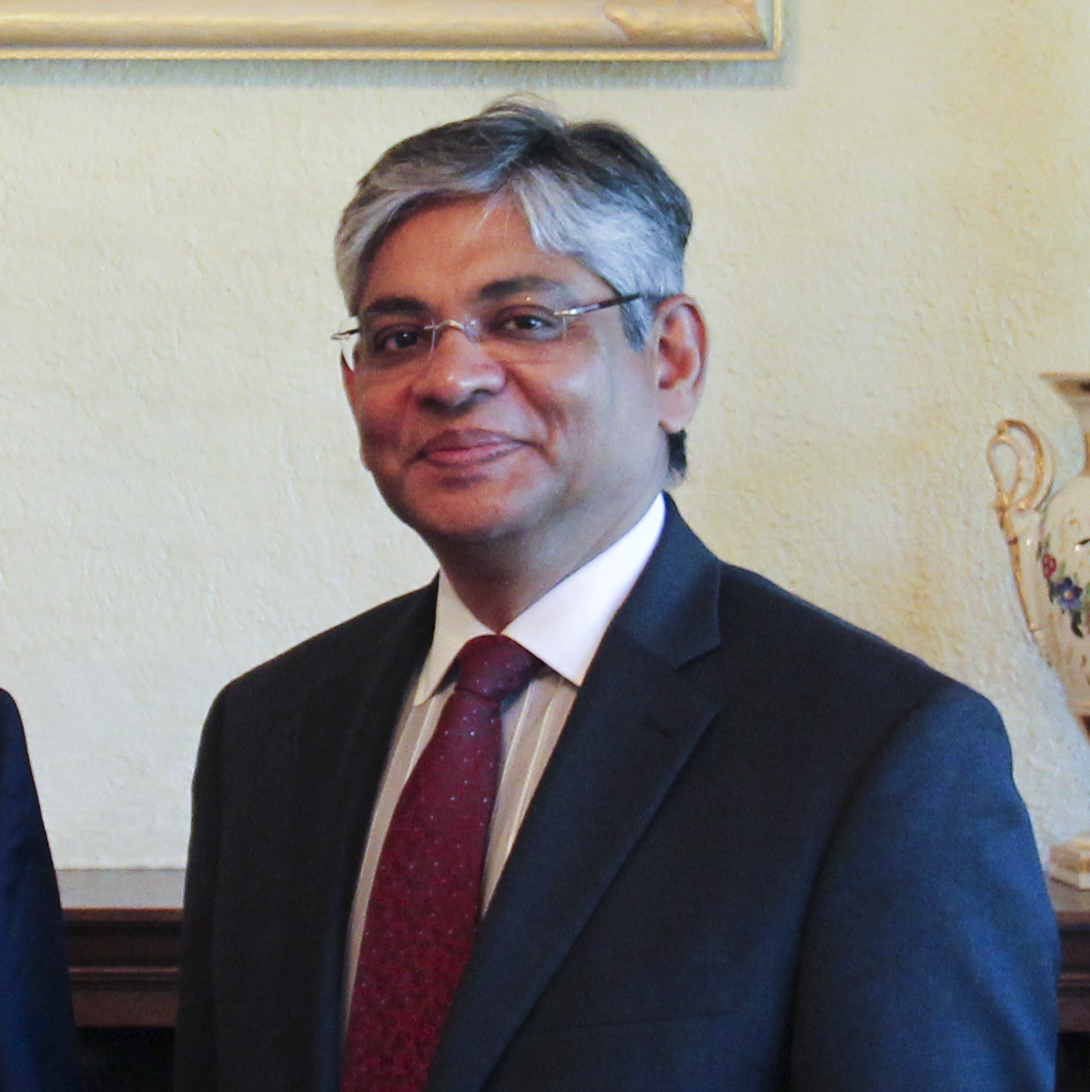

Indian Ambassador to the United States
- In office 6 May 2015 – August 2016
- Preceded by: Subrahmanyam Jaishankar
- Succeeded by: Navtej Sarna

Ambassador of India to France
- In office 28 April 2013 – 30 April 2015
- Preceded by: Rakesh Sood
- Succeeded by: Dr. Mohan Kumar

Deputy Chief of Mission at the Embassy of India Washington, D.C.
- In office October 2008 – April 2013

Ambassador of India to Israel
- In office April 2005 – September 2008
- Preceded by: Raminder Jassal
- Succeeded by: Navtej Sarna

Personal details
- Education: Delhi University
- Occupation: Diplomat

Arun Kumar Singh or commonly Arun Singh is a retired Indian diplomat of Indian Foreign Service. He was the Indian Ambassador to the United States from 2015 to 2016. He is now a senior fellow with the Asia program at the German Marshall Fund of the United States. Before taking charge as ambassador in the United States, he served as Ambassador of India to France in Paris. On 8 March 2015, Ministry of External Affairs of India announced its decision to appoint Singh as the next Ambassador of India to the United States.

He is a career Indian Foreign Service officer. He had previously served as Deputy Chief of Mission at the Embassy at Washington, D.C. (2008–13), Ambassador to Israel (2005–2008) and as a Joint Secretary to the Ministry of External Affairs Government of India at New Delhi (2000–2005).

Currently, he is a Senior Counsellor at The Cohen Group, a consulting firm in Washington, D.C. that provides advice and assistance in marketing and regulatory affairs.

== Early life and background ==
Arun completed his formal education from St. Michael's High School, Patna. Singh joined the Indian Foreign Service in 1979, after completing his master's degree in economics from Delhi University, and teaching at the university for two years. He also teaches foreign policy for Young India Fellowship at Ashoka University.

== See also ==
- Harsh V Shringla
- Navtej Sarna
- Nirupama Rao
- Dr. Subrahmanyam Jaishankar
