= Binay Ranjan Sen =

Indian politician (1898–1993)

Binay Ranjan Sen CIE
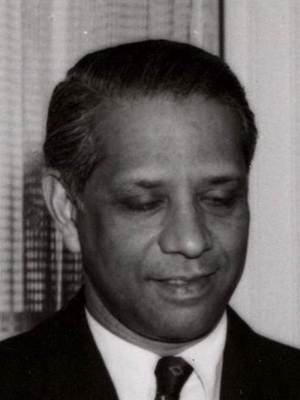
- Sen as ambassador to Yugoslavia

Director-General of the Food and Agriculture Organization
- In office November 1956 – December 1967
- Preceded by: Philip V. Cardon
- Succeeded by: Addeke Hendrik Boerma

3rd Ambassador of India to Japan
- In office 17 February 1955 – September 1956
- Prime Minister: Jawaharlal Nehru
- Preceded by: M. A. Rauf
- Succeeded by: Chandra Shekhar Jha

4th Ambassador of India to the United States
- In office 1951–1952
- Prime Minister: Jawaharlal Nehru
- Preceded by: Vijaya Lakshmi Pandit
- Succeeded by: Gaganvihari Lallubhai Mehta

Personal details
- Born: 1 January 1898 Dibrugarh, North-East Frontier, India (present-day Assam)
- Died: 12 June 1993 (aged 95) Calcutta, West Bengal, India (present-day Kolkata)
- Education: Scottish Church College (BS); University of Oxford
- Occupation: Civil servant

Binay Ranjan Sen (1 January 1898 – 12 June 1993) was an Indian civil servant and diplomat. He served as director-general of the Food and Agriculture Organization of the United Nations from 1956 to 1967. He drew on his experience as relief commissioner from 1942 to 1943 during the Bengal famine of 1943 to build the FAO from a data-gathering bureaucracy into a major force against world hunger.

== Biography ==
He studied at the Scottish Church College of the University of Calcutta and subsequently at the University of Oxford. Sen joined the Indian Civil Service in Bengal in 1922. His work as director general of food for all India (1943–1946), for which he was appointed a Companion of the Order of the Indian Empire in 1944, convinced him that hunger and malnutrition were crucial issues in the modern world.

He took his concerns to the international stage as a member of India's first delegation to the UN (1947), as Indian Ambassador to the United States, and several other countries including Italy, Yugoslavia, Japan, and Mexico. He worked on a variety of FAO projects before being named Director General in 1956. While he was the Relief Commissioner(1942–43)in Bengal during Bengal famine, his mission of preventing hunger was set. In 1960, saying half the world's population was malnourished, Sen announced the Freedom from Hunger campaign. "Hunger is neither inevitable nor irremediable," he added, "it is within our power to bring this old affliction under control." This led to the 1963 World Food Congress in Washington, D.C., attended by representatives from more than 100 countries.

== See also ==
- Freedom from Hunger, US charity associated with the UN campaign
