= Sujatha Singh =

30th Foreign Secretary of India

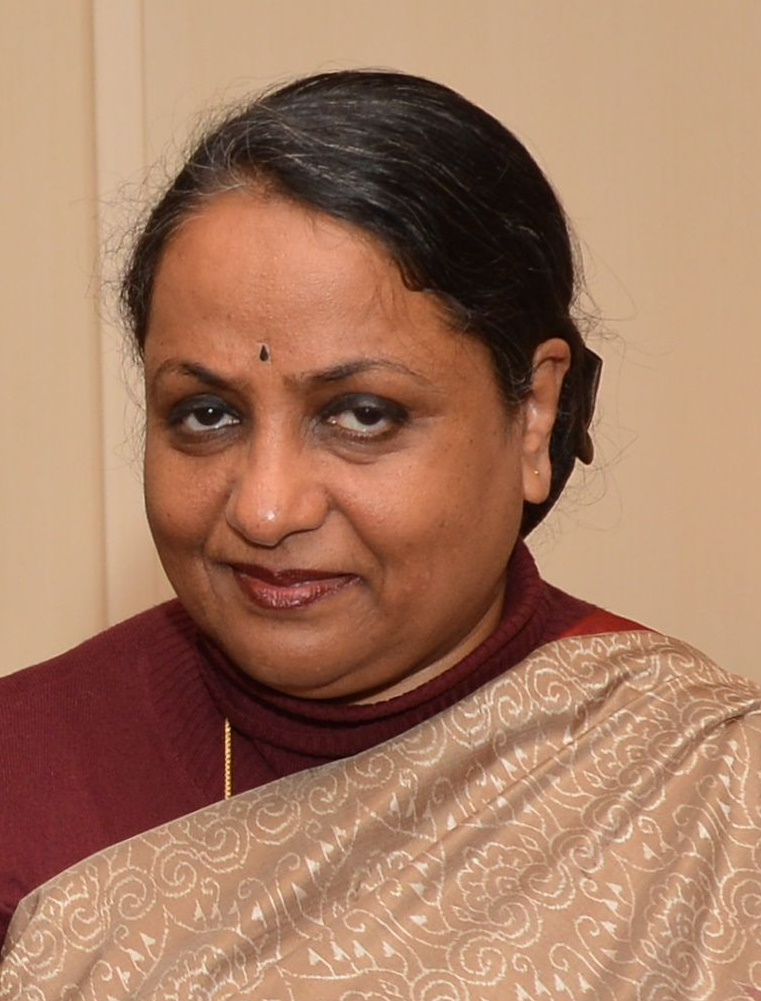

30th Foreign Secretary of India
- In office 1 August 2013 – 28 January 2015
- Prime Minister: Manmohan Singh, Narendra Modi
- Preceded by: Ranjan Mathai
- Succeeded by: Subrahmanyam Jaishankar

Ambassador of India to Germany
- In office 2012–2013
- Prime Minister: Manmohan Singh
- Preceded by: Sudhir Vyas
- Succeeded by: Vijay Keshav Gokhale

Higher Commissioner of India to Australia
- In office 2007–2012
- Prime Minister: Manmohan Singh
- Preceded by: RP Shukla
- Succeeded by: Biren Nanda

Personal details
- Born: July 1954 (age 72) India
- Spouse: Dr. Sanjay M. Singh
- Parents: T. V. Rajeswar; Mahalakshmi
- Education: Lady Shri Ram College; Delhi School of Economics
- Occupation: IFS
- Profession: retired diplomat

Sujatha Singh (born July 1954) is a retired Indian diplomat of the Indian Foreign Service who served as the 30th Foreign Secretary of India. Previously she also served as the Ambassador of India to Germany and as the High Commissioner of India to Australia.

== Family and education ==
Born in July 1954, Sujatha Singh is the daughter of the former Intelligence Bureau chief and, later, Governor of Uttar Pradesh T. V. Rajeswar. She is an alumna of the Lady Shri Ram College, New Delhi and the Delhi School of Economics from where she graduated in economics. She is married to Sanjay Singh, who is a retired Indian Foreign Service officer.

== Career ==
Singh is an Indian Foreign Service (IFS) officer of the 1976 batch. She is a German speaker and served in various positions at the Indian embassies at Bonn, Accra, Paris, and Bangkok. She was India's Consul general at Milan during 2000–04. She has also served as India's High Commissioner to Australia (2007–2012). In Delhi she has served on the Ministry's Economic Co-ordination Unit and dealt with Nepal, West Europe and the EU as director, undersecretary and joint secretary. Her tenure as High Commissioner to Australia was marked by turbulence in Indo-Australian ties following racial attacks on Indian students and later by the Australian Labour Party's decision to make an exception for India regarding the sale of uranium. She has a reputation for toughness, volunteering as a liaison officer on a rain-hit Kailash Manasarovar Yatra in 1983, taking a tough stance with the Australian authorities on dealing with the racial attacks against Indians there, and, as joint secretary handling Western Europe, she advocated India's stance of not accepting prescriptive aid from small European Union nations.

== Foreign Secretary ==
In 2013, Sujatha Singh succeeded Ranjan Mathai as Foreign Secretary of India. Though Singh was senior by tenure, her appointment as foreign secretary over S. Jaishankar was criticised by citing her inexperience in holding key diplomatic offices. The fact that she had never served as ambassador to any of India's neighbouring nations, unlike Jaishankar, was seen as a challenge.

In the normal course, she should have retired from the IFS in July 2014 upon her 60th birthday, but appointments to the position of foreign secretary are usually made for a tenure of two years, and such was the case with her. She thus received an extension in service of thirteen months, and her two-year term as Foreign Secretary should have ended in August 2015. However, a government order on 28 January 2015, issued by the newly elected government of Narendra Modi, terminated her extended service and appointed another person to the post of Foreign Secretary. This was S. Jaishankar, who as Indian Ambassador to the United States had played a key role during Indian Prime Minister Modi's visit to the US, and in US President Obama's visit to India.

Diplomatic posts
Preceded by R.P. Shukla	High Commissioner of India to Australia; 2007–2012	Succeeded by Biren Nanda
Preceded by Sudhir Vyas	Ambassador of India to Germany; 2012–2013	Succeeded by Vijay Keshav Gokhale
Preceded by Ranjan Mathai	Foreign Secretary of India; 2013–2015	Succeeded by S. Jaishankar
