= List of high commissioners of India to Australia =

Head of mission of India to Australia

High Commissioner of India to Australia
- Incumbent; Nagesh Singh since 1 February 2026
- Ministry of External Affairs
- Style: His Excellency
- Reports to: Minister for External Affairs
- Seat: Canberra
- Appointer: President of India
- Inaugural holder: Raghunath P. Paranjpe
- Formation: 1945
- Website: India High Commission, Canberra

The high commissioner of India to Australia is the chief diplomatic representative of India to Australia.

== History ==
The first high commissioner of India to Australia was R. P. Paranjpye.

K. M. Cariappa was appointed the High Commissioner in 1953. He became known for his opposition to the White Australia policy.

== List ==
S. No.	Name	Photo	Entered office	Left office
1	Raghunath P. Paranjpe		1945	1947
2	Daya Singh Bedi		1948	1951
3	M. S. Duleepsinghji		1951	1954
4	K. M. Cariappa		1954	1956
5	K.R. P. Singh		1956	1958
6	Parakat Achutha Menon		1958	1961
7	Samar Sen		1961	1963
8	B.K. Massand		1963	1965
9	D. N. Chatterjee		1965	1969
10	A. M. Thomas		1969	1972
11	S. Krishnamurti		1972	1975
12	S. Sinha		1975	1977
13	Jagdish Chand Ajmani		1977	1980
14	Krishan Dayal Sharma		1980	1982
15	D.S. Kamtekar		1982	1985
16	Mohammad Hamid Ansari		1985	1989
17	S. K. Bhutani		1989	1992
18	A. M. Khaleeli		1992	1995
19	G. Parthasarathy		1995	1999
20	C. P. Ravindranathan		1999	2000
21	R. S. Rathore		2000	2004
22	R. P. Shukla		2004	2007
23	Sujatha Singh		2007	2012
24	Biren Nanda		2012	2015
25	Navdeep Singh Suri		2015	2016
26	A.M. Gondane		2016	2019
27	A. Gitesh Sarma		2019	2021
28	Manpreet Vohra		2021	2023
29	Gopal Baglay		2024	2026
30	Nagesh Singh		2026	Present
