= List of ambassadors of India to Russia =

Ambassador of India to Russia

- Flag of India
- Incumbent; Vinay Kumar since 2024
- Seat: Moscow, Russia
- Inaugural holder: Vijaya Lakshmi Pandit
- Formation: 1947

The following people have served as ambassadors of India to Russia and its predecessor state, the Soviet Union:

== Ambassador of India to the Soviet Union ==
| Name | Portrait | Entered office | Left office | Notes |
|---|---|---|---|---|
| Vijaya Lakshmi Pandit | | 1947 | 1949 | First Woman President of the United Nations General Assembly (1953) |
| Sarvepalli Radhakrishnan | | 1949 | 1952 | 2nd President of India (1962–1967) |
| Kumara Padma Sivasankara Menon | | 1952 | 1961 | |
| Subimal Dutt | | 1961 | 1962 | |
| T. N. Kaul | | 1962 | 1966 | |
| Kewal Singh | | 1966 | 1968 | |
| Durga Prasad Dhar | | 1969 | 1971 | |
| K. S. Shelvankar | | 1971 | 1975 | |
| Durga Prasad Dhar | | 1975 | 1975 | |
| Inder Kumar Gujral | | 1976 | 1980 | 12th Prime Minister of India (1997–1998) |
| V. K. Ahuja | | 1980 | 1983 | |
| Saiyid Nurul Hasan | | 1983 | 1986 | Governor of several Indian states |
| T. N. Kaul | | 1986 | 1989 | |
| A. S. Gonsalves | | 1989 | 1992 | |

== Ambassador of India to Russia ==
| Name | Image | Entered office | Left office | Notes |
|---|---|---|---|---|
| Ronen Sen | | 1992 | 1998 | Later High Commissioner of India to the United Kingdom and Ambassador of India to the United States. |
| Satinder Kumar Lambah | | 1998 | 2001 | |
| K. Raghunath | | 2001 | 2004 | |
| Kanwal Sibal | | 2004 | 2007 | 24th Foreign Secretary of India (2001-02) |
| Prabhat Prakash Shukla | | 2007 | 2011 | |
| Ajai Malhotra | | 2011 | 2013 | |
| P. S. Raghavan | | 2014 | 2016 | |
| Pankaj Saran | | 2016 | 2018 | Deputy National Security Advisor (2018-2022) |
| D. Bala Venkatesh Varma | | 2018 | 2021 | |
| Pavan Kapoor | | 2021 | 2024 | Deputy National Security Advisor (2024-Incumbent) |
| Vinay Kumar | | 2024 | Incumbent | |

== See also ==
- Embassy of India, Moscow
- Embassy of India School Moscow
