= Ronen Sen =

Indian diplomat (born 1944)

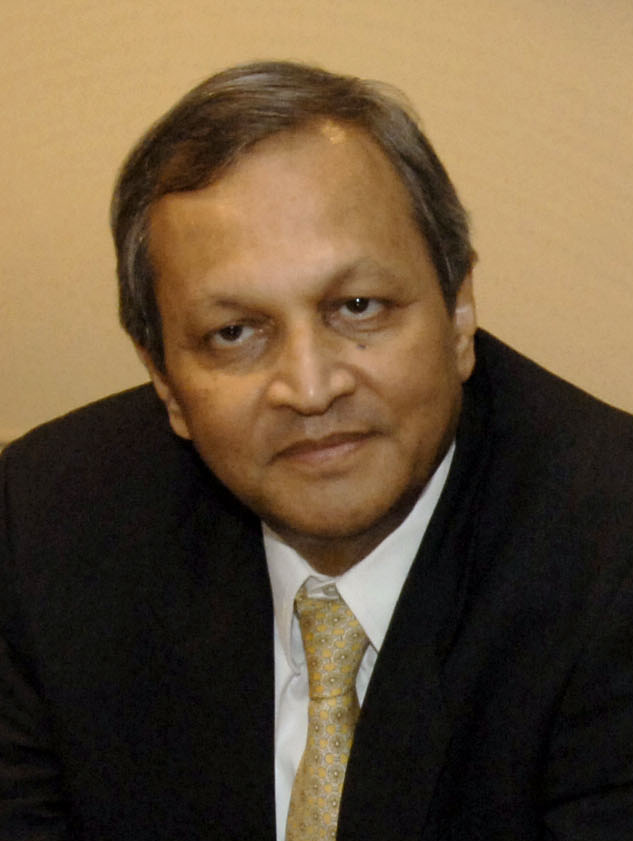
- Sen in the United States in 2016

21st Ambassador of India to the United States
- In office August 2004 – March 2009
- Preceded by: Lalit Mansingh
- Succeeded by: Meera Shankar

19th High Commissioner of India to the United Kingdom
- In office May 2002 – April 2004
- Preceded by: Nareshwar Dayal
- Succeeded by: Kamalesh Sharma

17th Ambassador of India to Germany
- In office October 1998 – May 2002
- Preceded by: S. K. Lambah
- Succeeded by: T. C. A. Rangachari

1st Ambassador of India to Russia
- In office October 1992 – October 1995
- Preceded by: A. S. Gonsalves (then Soviet Union)
- Succeeded by: S. K. Lambah

15th Ambassador of India to South Korea
- In office 29 September 1991 – 24 September 1992
- Preceded by: U. C. Soni
- Succeeded by: P. A. Nazareth

Personal details
- Born: 9 April 1944 (age 82) Kolkata, West Bengal, India
- Spouse: Kalpana Sen
- Children: 2
- Education: University of Calcutta
- Occupation: Civil servant IFS

Ranendra "Ronen" Sen (born 9 April 1944) is an Indian diplomat who was India's ambassador to the United States of America from August 2004 to March 2009. His contribution to the landmark US India Nuclear Deal of 2005 is considered highly significant.

== Career ==
Mr. Sen served as an Independent Director of Tata Motors, from 1 June 2010 till 2012. On 1 April 2015, Mr. Sen was appointed as a non-executive independent director on the board of Tata Sons, the promoter company of major companies in the Tata Group.

== Controversies ==
=== "Headless chicken" remark ===
In August 2007, Sen was issued notice (and subsequently censured) by the Parliamentary Privileges Committee to explain the "headless chicken" remark he was alleged to have made in an off-the-record interview published by Rediff.com on 20, August 2007, titled: "We will have zero credibility" on the Atomic Energy Pact. Sen had said:

It has been approved here (in Washington, DC) by the President, and there (in New Delhi) it's been approved by the Indian cabinet. So why do you have all this running around like a headless chicken, looking for a comment here or comment there, and these little storms in a tea-cup?

Following the uproar over this remark, Sen later tendered his apology before the Parliamentary Privileges Committee. Sen clarified:

My comment about "running round like headless chicken looking for a comment here or comment there" was a tactless observation on some of my media friends, and most certainly not with reference to any Honourable Member of Parliament.

The Lok Sabha Committee and the Rajya Sabha, panel decided to close the issue, since "Sen has tendered unconditional and sincere apologies". The Rajya Sabha Committee said, in it report, tabled in the House:

In view of Sen's acceptance of having made the impugned remarks and that the same were unwarranted, and having tendered his unconditional apology, the Committee recommends that the matter should be allowed to rest here.

In its uncharacteristic censure, the Rajya Sabha panel felt his remarks were:

not only in poor taste but also unwarranted... personal frame of mind should not have influenced public utterances of a senior and experienced diplomat... The Committee expects that such lapses, as admitted by him, shall not recur

Diplomatic posts
Preceded by A. S. Gonsalves	Ambassador of India to Russia; 1992 - 1998	Succeeded by Satinder Kumar Lambah
Preceded by Nareshwar Dayal	High Commissioner of India to the United Kingdom; 2002 - 2004	Succeeded by Kamalesh Sharma
Preceded by Lalit Mansingh	Ambassador of India to the United States; 2004 - 2009	Succeeded by Meera Shankar
