= Dwarka Nath Chatterjee =

Ambassador of India to France
- In office February 1969 - 1976
- Preceded by: Chandra Shekhar
- Succeeded by: Ramchandra Dattatraya Sathe

Deputy High Commissioner of India to the United Kingdom

Acting High Commissioner of India to the United Kingdom
- In office 1967–1969
- Succeeded by: P. N. Kaul

High Commissioner of India to Australia
- In office 1965 - 1968

Ambassador of India to the Democratic Republic of the Congo
- In office 1962 - 1964

Personal details
- Born: 2 November 1914
- Military career
- Allegiance: British Indian Army
- Rank: Major

Dwarka Nath Chatterjee (born 2 November 1914) was an Indian diplomat.

== Early life and education ==
Chatterjee was born on 2 November 1914.

Chatterjee was educated at Calcutta University, and later went on to attend King's College, London, London School of Economics and School of Oriental Studies.

== Career ==
Chatterjee joined the military in 1940 and served until 1948, attaining the rank of Major. In 1948, he joined the Indian Foreign Service.

Between 1962 and 1964, he was the Indian Ambassador to the Congo. Between 1969 and 1969, he was the deputy high commissioner to the UK.

In 1969 he was appointed the ambassador to France and served till 1976.
