= Embassy of India School Moscow =

Embassy of India School Moscow(Kendriya vidyalaya Moscow)
- Школа при посольстве Индии

Location
- 10/2 Ulitsa Bolshaya Dorogomilovskaya (4th and 5th Floors), Kievskaya, Moscow [Moscow; Russia; 55.74699039999999°N 37.56271340000001°E

Information
- Type: Indian international school
- Established: 1987
- Grades: 1-12
- Campus size: Small
- Website: kendriyavidyalaya-moscow.org/home.php

Embassy of India School Moscow (EOI School, Russian: Школа при посольстве Индии, romanized: Shkola pri posolstve Indii), also known as Kendriya Vidyalaya Moscow, is an Indian education school located on the third, fourth and fifth floors of the 10/2 Ulitsa Bolshaya Dorogomilovskaya building in Dorogomilovo District, Moscow, Russia, close to the Kiyevskaya Metro Station.

The school, affiliated to the Embassy of India in Moscow, was established in 1987. As of 2012 the school had more than 350 students in classes I to XII.

It is one of three schools under the Kendriya Vidyalaya Sangathan (transl. Central School Organization) outside of India, the others being; Kendriya Vidyalaya, Kathmandu, Nepal and Kendriya Vidyalaya Tehran, Iran

The Ambassador of India to Russia is the school's patron. The school uses the National Council of Educational Research and Training (NCERT) curriculum and is affiliated with the Central Board of Secondary Education. The school offers commerce and science streams for its students. Fees are around 5500 US Dollars.

== History ==
In October 2002, after the Moscow theater hostage crisis, the school temporarily stopped operations to protect students who do not appear Russian from reprisals.

According to an opinion article by Vladimir Radyuhin in The Hindu, as of 2011, there were Indian and Indian-Russian families in Moscow who would otherwise send their children to KV Moscow who do not do so because it charges tuition and/or because of traffic issues making the travel time too long. Moscow government schools do not charge tuition and/or are in much closer proximity, and so are used by those families instead.

== Operations ==
The Ministry of External Affairs (India) finances the school.

In 2012, the school had a five-day week while many of the KV schools in India at the time had six days.

== See also ==
- Russian Embassy School in Delhi
- India-Russia relations
- Education in India
