= Gaganvihari Lallubhai Mehta =

Indian diplomat (1900–1974)

Gaganvihari Lallubhai Mehta CIE

5th Ambassador of India to the United States
- In office 1952–1958
- Prime Minister: Jawaharlal Nehru
- Preceded by: Binay Ranjan Sen
- Succeeded by: M. C. Chagla

Personal details
- Born: 15 April 1900 Ahmedabad, Gujarat, India
- Died: 28 April 1974 (aged 74) Mumbai, Maharashtra, India
- Education: Elphinstone College
- Occupation: Civil servant

Gaganvihari Lallubhai Mehta (15 April 1900 – 28 April 1974) was an Indian civil servant and diplomat who served as the fifth ambassador of India to the United States from 1952 to 1958.

== Biography ==
Mehta was born to his parents, Lallubhai Samaldas and Satyavati on 15 April 1900 in Ahmedabad, Gujarat, India. His father was the wealthy aristocrat and revenue commissioner of Bhavnagar. He completed his matriculation at New English School, Mumbai in 1971 and passed his B.A. with history and economics at Elphinstone College and later joined London School of Economics. Due to ill health, he left his studies in London incomplete and returned to Mumbai. Here in 1928, he received his M.A. degree from the University of Bombay by writing an essay on the social thinking of Bertrand Russell. He worked at the assistant editor of the Bombay Chronicle from 1923 to 1925 before working for the Scindia Steam Navigation Company.

In 1937, he was appointed as a representative of the International Chamber of Commerce and the same year participated in the International Trade Conference as a member of the Indian Mill Owners' Delegation. In 1939-40, he was appointed president of the Indian Chamber of Commerce in Calcutta. In 1942–43, he took over as the President of the Federation of Indian Chambers of Commerce & Industry (FICCI). In 1944, he attended the International Trade Conference as deputy leader of the Indian delegation. He represented India at the International Trade Employment Conference organized as Geneva in 1947 and took part in International Trade General Assembly in Montreal.

During 1947–50, he held the position of Director of the Indian Customs Board; He also served as a member of the Constitution Committee. In 1950-52, he was appointed as a member of the Planning Commission. In 1958, he was appointed chairman of Hindustan Shipyard. During 1959-63, he served as Chairman of the National Shipping Board and in 1965 as Chairman of Air India and Indian Airlines.

After India gained its independence from the United Kingdom, he became the president of the Tariff Board before becoming the ambassador of India to the United States from 1952 to 1958. He was refused service in a Houston airport restaurant because he was not white, leading John Foster Dulles to conclude that US segregation was hurting foreign relations.

Gaganvihari Lallubhai Mehta was the first Gujarati to be awarded the Padma Vibhushan in 1959. His elder brother, Vaikunthbhai Lallubhai Mehta, was the first Gujarati to be awarded the Padma Bhushan in 1954.

== Writing ==
Mehta's notable publications include Aakash na Pushpo (lit. 'The Flowers of the Sky') and Avali Ganga in Gujarati. 'The Conscious of a Nation','Studies in Gandhism'; 'From Rag Agals'; 'Perversities' and 'Understanding India' are his English publications.

Political offices
Preceded by Binay Ranjan Sen	Indian Ambassador to the United States; 1952-1958	Succeeded by M. C. Chagla
