= Ranjan Mathai =

Indian diplomat

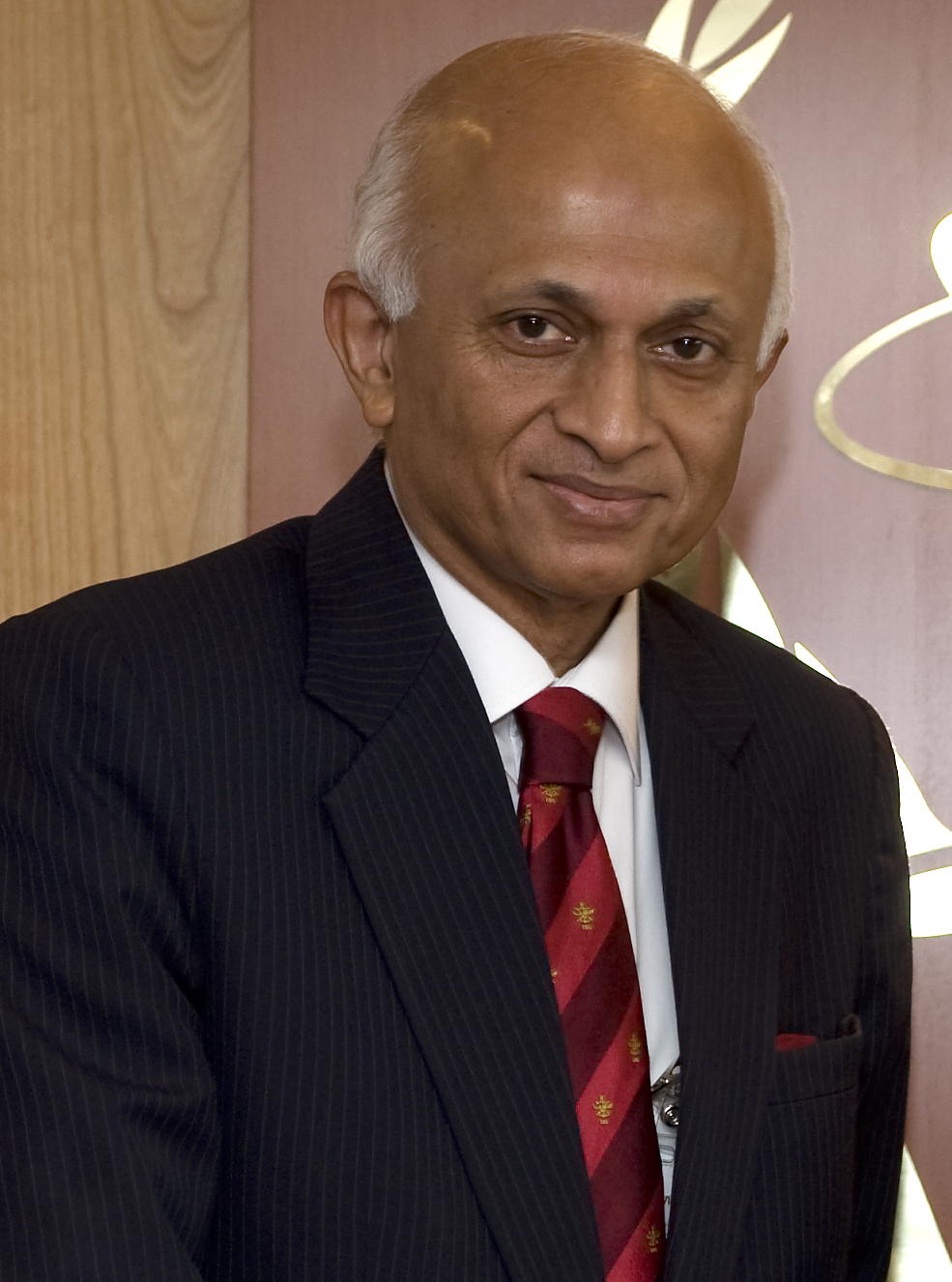

High Commission of India to the United Kingdom
- In office 9 December 2013 – 31 October 2015
- Preceded by: Jaimini Bhagwati
- Succeeded by: Navtej Sarna

29th Foreign Secretary of India
- In office 1 August 2011 – 1 August 2013
- Preceded by: Nirupama Rao
- Succeeded by: Sujatha Singh

Personal details
- Born: 24 May 1952 (age 74) Thiruvalla, Kerala, India
- Occupation: IFS
- Profession: Civil Servant

Ranjan Mathai (born 1952) is an Indian civil servant of the IFS cadre who was a former Indian Foreign Secretary and Indian High Commissioner to the UK. Prior to this, he served as Foreign Secretary of India from 1 August 2011 to 31 July 2013.

== Early life ==
Ranjan Mathai was born in Thiruvalla, Kerala, India. He did his post graduate studies in political science at the University of Pune. His father, Thomas Mathai, was a senior faculty member at the National Defence Academy. His mother Sara was a teacher at Khadakvasla, Pune.

== Career ==
Ranjan Mathai is a 1974 batch Indian Foreign Service Officer.He joined the IFS after completing post graduate studies in political science at the University of Poona. He has served in Indian Embassies in Vienna, Colombo, Washington, Tehran and Brussels.

As Joint Secretary (BSM) in the Ministry of External Affairs in New Delhi (January 1995 to February 1998), he headed the Division dealing with India's relations with Bangladesh, Sri Lanka, Myanmar and Maldives. Mathai has also served as Indian Ambassador to Israel – February 1998 to June 2001, and was the Indian Ambassador in Qatar from August 2001 to July 2005. He held the post of Deputy High Commissioner of India to the UK in London from August 2005 to January 2007.

He became Ambassador of India to France in January 2007. Ranjan Mathai took over as India's High commissioner to the UK on Monday, 9 December 2013. He succeeded Jaimini Bhagwati. Prior to this he was the Foreign Secretary of India. On 31 July 2013, he demitted office and Sujatha Singh took over as the new Foreign Secretary.

== Personal life ==
Ranjan Mathai is married to Geetha Mathai.

Diplomatic posts
Preceded by Nirupama Rao	Foreign Secretary of India; 2011–2013	Succeeded by Sujatha Singh
