= Vinay Kumar (diplomat) =

Indian diplomat and Ambassador of India to Russia

His Excellency Vinay Kumar IFS
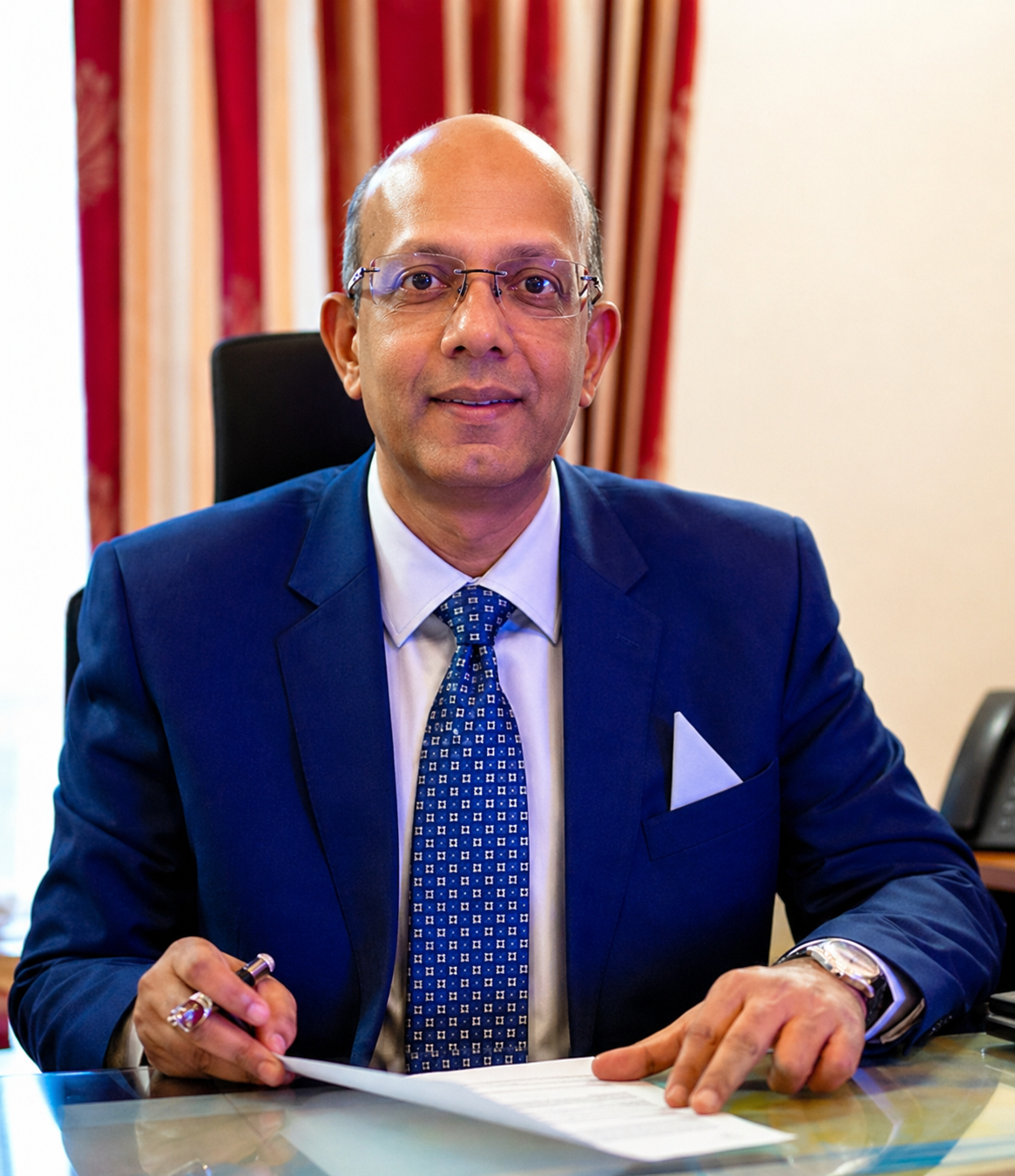
- Vinay Kumar in 2024

Ambassador of India to Russia
- Incumbent
- Assumed office April 2024
- President: Droupadi Murmu
- Prime Minister: Narendra Modi
- Preceded by: Pavan Kapoor

Ambassador of India to Myanmar
- In office 2022–2024
- President: Droupadi Murmu
- Prime Minister: Narendra Modi
- Preceded by: Saurabh Kumar
- Succeeded by: Abhay Thakur

Ambassador of India to Afghanistan
- In office 2018–2020
- President: Ram Nath Kovind
- Prime Minister: Narendra Modi
- Preceded by: Manpreet Vohra

Personal details
- Born: Vinay Kumar; 23 August 1969 (age 57) India
- Spouse: Married
- Children: 2 (daughters)
- Education: IIT Kharagpur (B.Tech.)
- Occupation: Civil servant; Diplomat
- Rank: Secretary

Vinay Kumar is an Indian diplomat and a senior officer of the Indian Foreign Service (1992 batch). He is currently serving as the Ambassador of India to Russia. Over a career spanning more than three decades, he has held several key diplomatic, multilateral and administrative positions in India and abroad, including ambassadorships in Myanmar and Afghanistan.

== Early life and education ==
Vinay Kumar was born on 23 August 1969. He graduated from the Indian Institute of Technology, Kharagpur in 1991 with a Bachelor of Technology (Honours) degree. He joined the Indian Foreign Service in 1992 after qualifying the Civil Services Examination.

== Diplomatic career ==
=== Early overseas postings ===
Following his induction into the Indian Foreign Service, Kumar served in several Indian diplomatic missions abroad. His early postings included assignments in Tashkent (1994–1995) and Bishkek (1995–1998). He later served at the Indian High Commission in Ottawa from 1998 to 2001.

He was posted to the Embassy of India in Warsaw between 2003 and 2006, followed by a posting in Tehran from 2006 to 2009. From 2010 to 2013, he served at the Permanent Mission of India to the United Nations in New York.

=== United Nations and multilateral roles ===
During his tenure at the United Nations, Kumar served as India's Political Coordinator in the United Nations Security Council during 2011–2012. He was also a member of the Advisory Committee on Administrative and Budgetary Questions (ACABQ) in 2013.

=== Senior roles in Nepal ===
He was posted to Kathmandu from 2015 to 2017, where he served as Deputy Chief of Mission at the Embassy of India.

=== Ministry of External Affairs, New Delhi ===
At the headquarters of the Ministry of External Affairs in New Delhi, Kumar has held several senior administrative and policy positions. He served as Deputy Secretary in charge of Eastern Europe and Russia (2001–2003), Director for Administrative matters (2009–2010), and Joint Secretary for the East and Southern Africa Division (2013–2015).

He subsequently served as Joint Secretary for the Southern Division (2017–2018) and later as Additional Secretary (International Organizations and Summits) from 2020 to 2022, overseeing India's engagement with multilateral institutions and global summits.

=== Ambassadorial appointments ===
Kumar was appointed as the Ambassador of India to Afghanistan in 2018, serving until 2020. He later served as the Ambassador of India to Myanmar from 2022 to 2024.

=== Ambassador of India to Russia ===
In April 2024, Vinay Kumar assumed charge as the Ambassador of India to Russia, representing India's interests in bilateral, regional and global engagements with the Russian Federation.

== Personal life ==
Vinay Kumar is married and has two daughters.

== See also ==
- Indian Foreign Service
- India–Russia relations
- Ministry of External Affairs (India)
- List of ambassadors and high commissioners of India
