= List of ambassadors of India to the United States =

Ambassador of India to the United States
- Emblem of India

- Flag of India

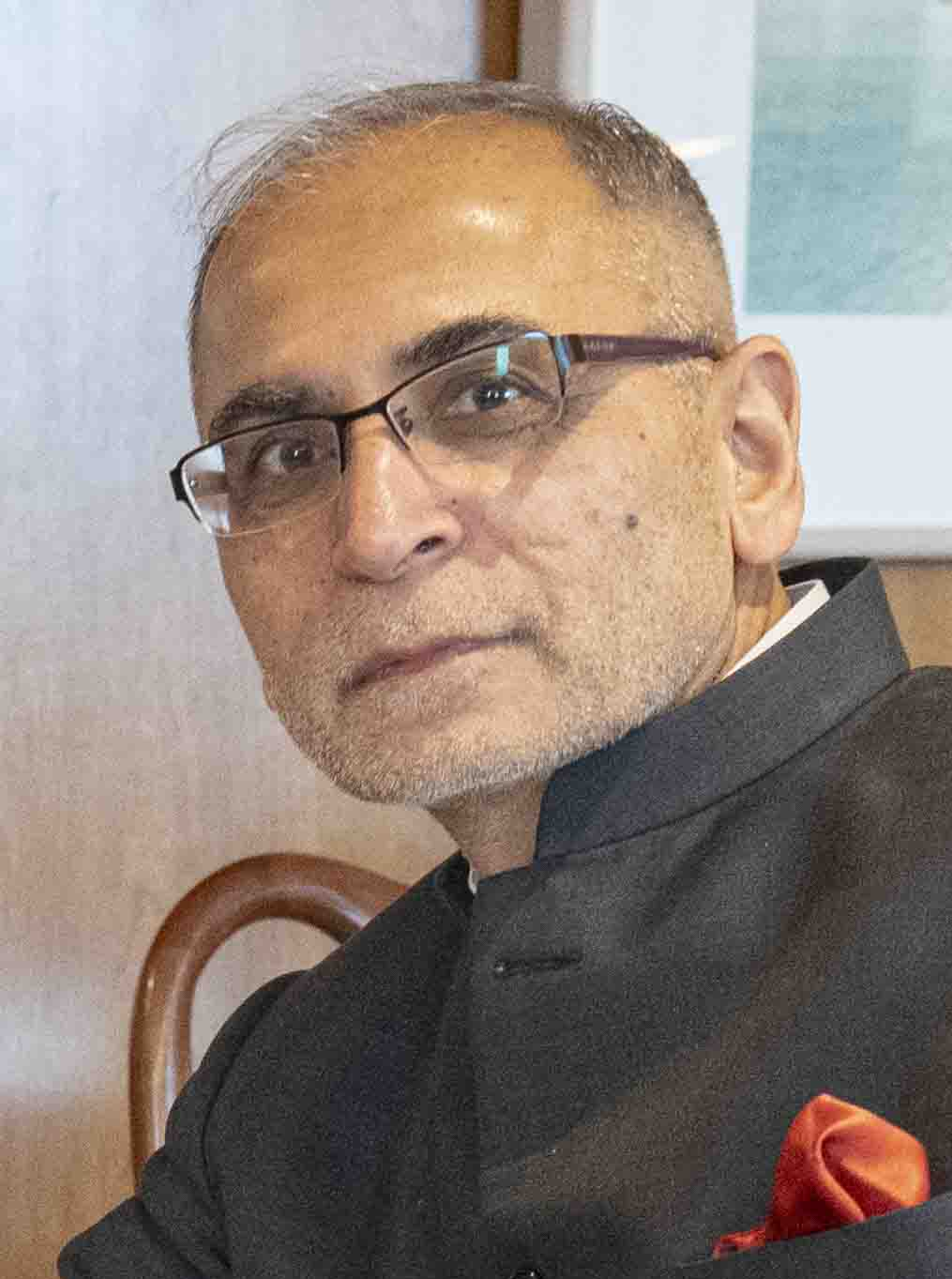
- Incumbent; Vinay Mohan Kwatra since 13 August 2024
- Appointer: President of India
- Inaugural holder: Asaf Ali
- Formation: 1947
- Website: Embassy of India, Washington D.C., U.S.

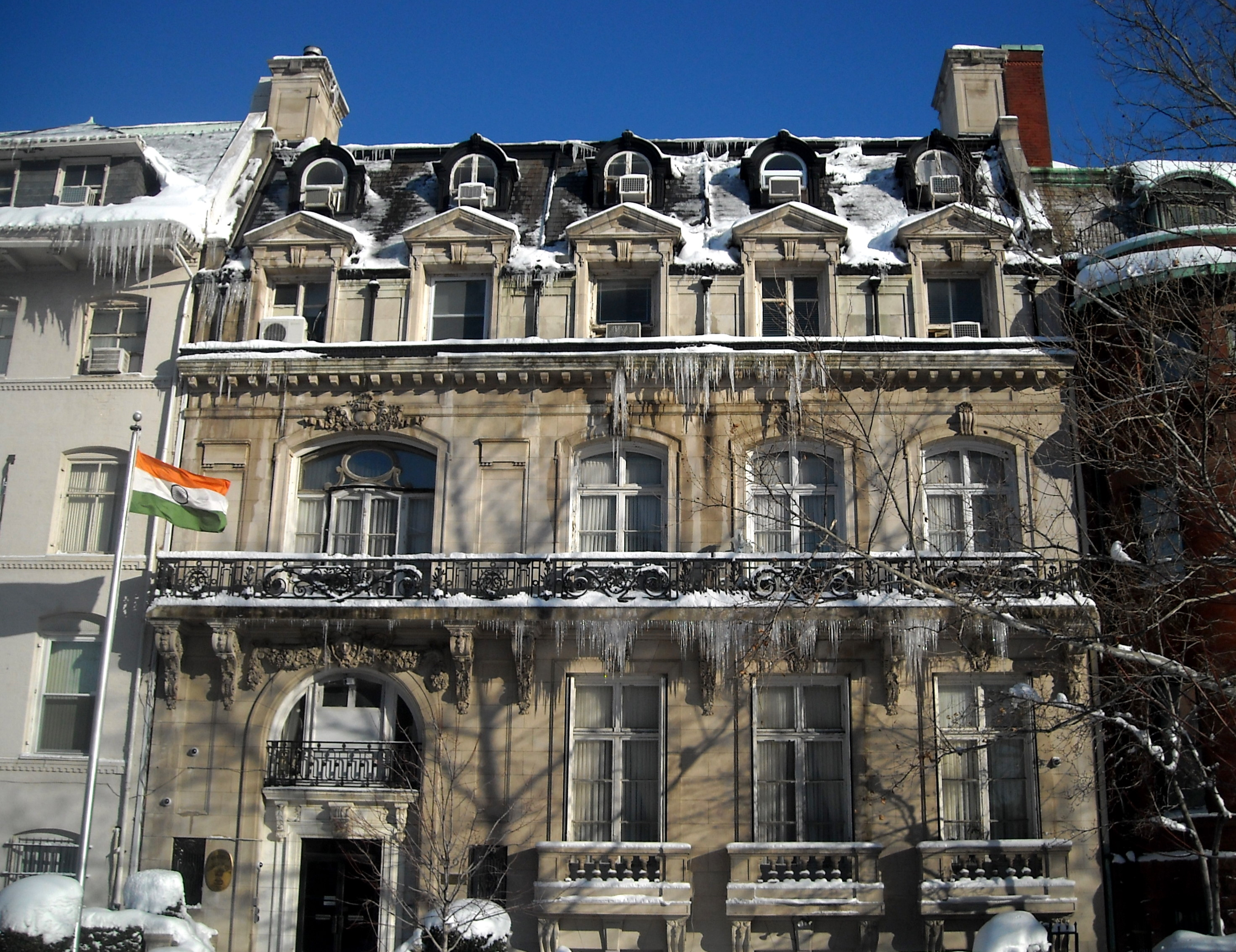
Embassy of India in Washington, D.C.

The ambassador of India to the United States is the chief diplomatic representative of India to the United States, housed in the Indian Embassy in Washington, D.C. The current ambassador is Vinay Mohan Kwatra.

== List of Indian ambassadors to the United States ==
Sr. No.	Name	Photo	Entered office	Left office	Notes
1st	Asaf Ali		1947	1948	Governor of Odisha (1948–1952); Lawyer and veteran of the Indian independence movement.
2nd	Benegal Rama Rau		1948	1949	4th Governor of the Reserve Bank of India (1949–1957); Indian Civil Service (ICS) officer.
3rd	Vijaya Lakshmi Pandit		1949	1951	President of the United Nations General Assembly (1953–1954); Governor of Maharashtra (1962–1964); First woman to hold these positions.
4th	Binay Ranjan Sen		1951	1952	Director General of the Food and Agriculture Organization (1956–67); Played a key role in the global "Freedom from Hunger" campaign.
5th	Gaganvihari Lallubhai Mehta		1952	1958	Chairman of ICICI (1958–1971); Awarded the Padma Vibhushan (1959).
6th	M. C. Chagla		1958	1961	Minister of External Affairs (1966–1967); Chief Justice of the Bombay High Court (1948–1958)
7th	Braj Kumar Nehru		1961	1968	Governor of Jammu and Kashmir (1981–1984); Governor of Gujarat (1984–1986); ICS officer and cousin of Jawaharlal Nehru.
8th	Ali Yavar Jung		1968	1970	Governor of Maharashtra (1970–1976); Vice-Chancellor of Osmania University (1945–1946; 1948–1952).
9th	Lakshmi Kant Jha		1970	1973	Member of Parliament, Rajya Sabha (1986–1988); Governor of Jammu and Kashmir (1973–1981); Governor of the Reserve Bank of India (1967–1970); Secretary to the Prime Minister (1964–1966)
10th	T. N. Kaul		1973	1976	Foreign Secretary (1968–1972); Ambassador to the Soviet Union (1962–1966).; ICS officer.
11th	Kewal Singh		1976	1977	Foreign Secretary (1972–1976); Awarded the Padma Vibhushan (1970).; ICS officer.
12th	Nanabhoy Palkhivala		1977	1979	Eminent jurist and constitutional expert.; Leading figure in the Kesavananda Bharati v. State of Kerala case.
13th	K. R. Narayanan		1980	1984	10th President of India (1997–2002); 9th Vice President of India (1992–1997)
14th	Katyayani Shankar Bajpai		1984	1986	Secretary, Ministry of External Affairs (1982–1983); Ambassador to China (1980–1982).
15th	P. K. Kaul		1986	1989	Cabinet Secretary (1985–1986); Finance Secretary (1983–1985); Defence Secretary (1981–1983); IAS officer.
16th	Karan Singh		1989	1990	Governor of Jammu and Kashmir (1965–1967); Union Minister of Education (1973–1977).; Titular Maharaja of Jammu and Kashmir
17th	Abid Hussain		1990	1992	Member of the Planning Commission (1985–1990).; Commerce Secretary (1981–1985); IAS officer.
18th	Siddhartha Shankar Ray		1992	1996	Governor of Punjab (1986–1989); Chief Minister of West Bengal (1972–1977).; Minister of Education (1971–1972)
19th	Naresh Chandra		1996	2001	Governor of Gujarat (2004); Cabinet Secretary (1990–1992); Home Secretary (1990); Defence Secretary (1989–1990)
20th	Lalit Mansingh		2001	2004	Foreign Secretary (1999–2001); High Commissioner to the United Kingdom (1998–1999)
21st	Ronen Sen		August 2004	March 2009	Negotiated the India–United States Civil Nuclear Agreement; High Commissioner to the United Kingdom (2002–2004); Ambassador to Russia (1992–1998)
22nd	Meera Shankar		2009	2011	India's second woman ambassador to the US.; Ambassador to Germany (2005–2009).
23rd	Nirupama Rao		1 August 2011	5 November 2013	Foreign Secretary (2009–2011); Ambassador to China (2006–2009).
24th	Subrahmanyam Jaishankar		1 December 2013	28 January 2015	Minister of External Affairs (2019–Present).; Foreign Secretary (2015–2018)
25th	Arun Kumar Singh		6 May 2015	August 2016	Ambassador to France (2013–2015); Ambassador to Israel (2005–2008).
26th	Navtej Sarna		November 2016	20 December 2018	High Commissioner to the United Kingdom (2016); Ambassador to Israel (2008–2012).
27th	Harsh Vardhan Shringla		11 January 2019	11 January 2020	G20 Chief Coordinator (2022–2023); Foreign Secretary (2020–2022)
28th	Taranjit Singh Sandhu		6 February 2020	31 January 2024	Lieutenant governor of Delhi (2026-Present); High Commissioner to Sri Lanka (2017–2020)
29th	Vinay Mohan Kwatra		13 August 2024	Incumbent	Foreign Secretary (2022–2024); Ambassador to France (2017–2020) and Nepal (2020–2022)

== See also ==
- India–United States relations
