= Embassy of India, Washington, D.C. =

Diplomatic mission of the Republic of India to the United States

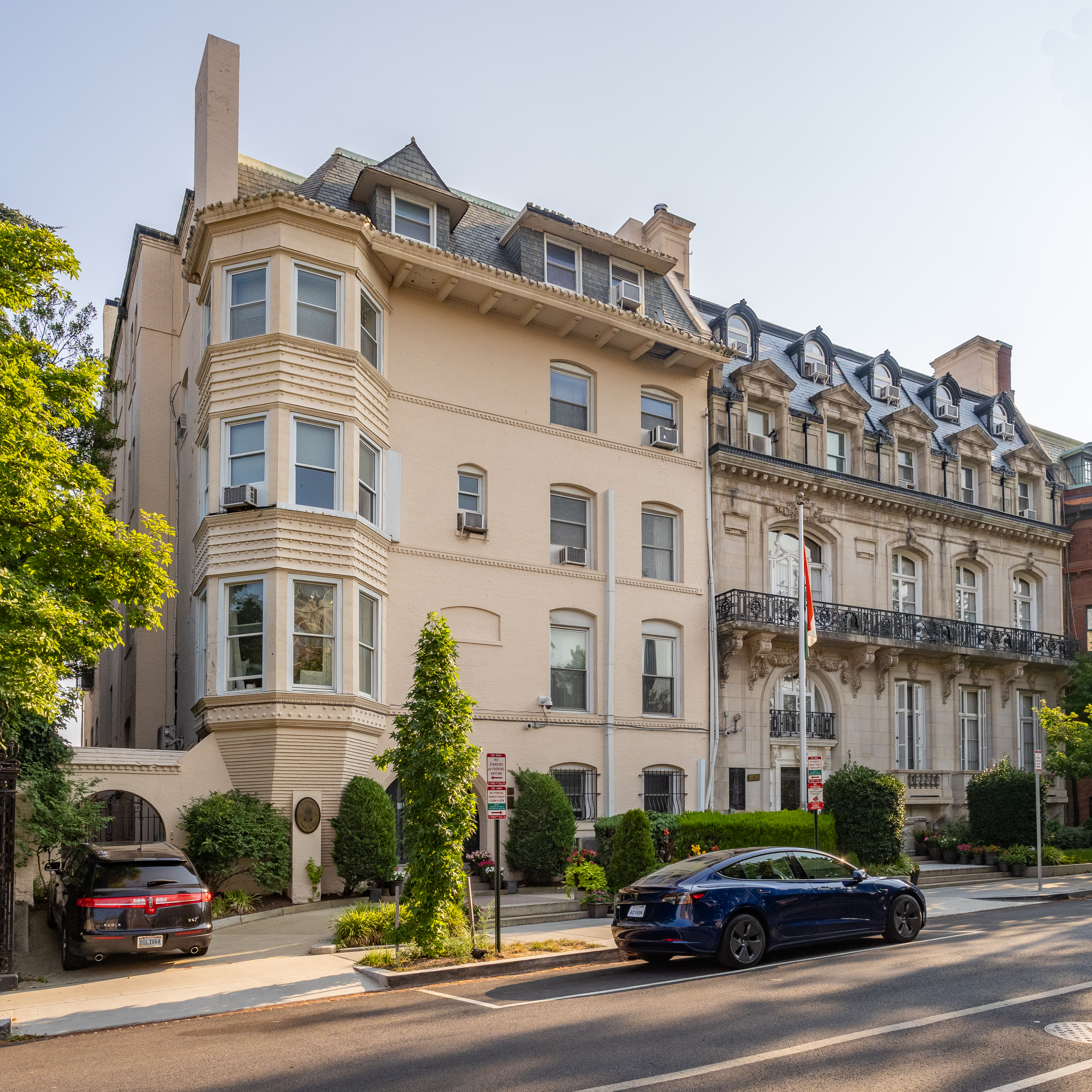
- Location: Washington, D.C.
- Address: 2107 Massachusetts Avenue, N.W. (Chancery); 2536 Massachusetts Avenue, N.W. (Consular Wing)
- Coordinates: 38°54′40.7″N 77°2′49.2″W
- Ambassador: Vinay Mohan Kwatra
- Website: Official website

The Embassy of India in Washington, D.C. is the diplomatic mission of the Republic of India to the United States. It is headed by the Indian Ambassador to the United States, Vinay Mohan Kwatra.

India also has consulates-general in Atlanta, Chicago, Houston, New York City, San Francisco and Seattle which are all associated with the Indian Embassy.

== Building ==
The chancery is hosted in two interconnected structures. The older one was built in 1885, and had four floors added to it in 1907. Physician T. Morris Murray had the other one finished in 1901, using granite and limestone in a French style. It was owned by numerous elites over the years and was named Depew House after one of its last owners, May Palmer Depew, the widow of Chauncey Depew. After she died in 1940, it was leased out to other tenants until the Indian government bought it in 1946 and connected the two buildings.

== Embassy of India Student Hub ==
The Embassy created the India Student Hub in 2019 to encourage Indian students' well-being and development.

During the 2019–2020 academic year, the Embassy of India Student Hub ran a Campus Lead Program with over 60 campus ambassadors at 40+ U.S. higher education institutions. The Campus Lead Program is designed to help the Embassy and Consulates stay in touch with Indian students and each other, and to help share opportunities for interested students and faculty to engage with India. The Campus Leads can create projects and initiatives to build leadership skills among students, through events like hackathons, festivals, and challenges. In February 2020, the Embassy Student Hub hosted the first Women's Film Festival, paying homage to women's voice, strength and resilience.

Through the Student Hub, The Embassy of India also aims to support its non-immigrant Indian student population in the United States on F and M visas.

During the COVID-19 pandemic of 2020, the Student Hub advised and assisted 200,000 Indian international students, releasing over ten student advisories and updates in the first three months of the pandemic. A Non-Emergency Peer Support Line was set up in March 2020 to help students connect with and seek advice from their peers, in addition to existing Embassy of India 24x7 phone lines. In April 2020, the Ambassador of India to the United States used the Embassy's Student Hub to communicate directly with students through a viral Instagram live session at the start of the pandemic. The Embassy of India Student Hub hosted a virtual graduation celebration in May 2020 to encourage students who had their Commencement ceremonies cancelled or deferred due to the public health emergency.

In July 2020, the Embassy connected with United States officials at the heels of a Student and Exchange Visitor Program rule change for the Fall 2020 semester that would require F-1 students to depart the country if their programs were fully online.

Several notable figures like Sunita Williams, Aparna Kumar and Ela Gandhi have interacted with Indian students through the Embassy Student Hub.

== See also ==
- India–United States relations
- Foreign relations of India
- Foreign relations of the United States
- List of diplomatic missions of India
- List of diplomatic missions in the United States
