= Nirupama Rao =

Indian civil servant (born 1950)

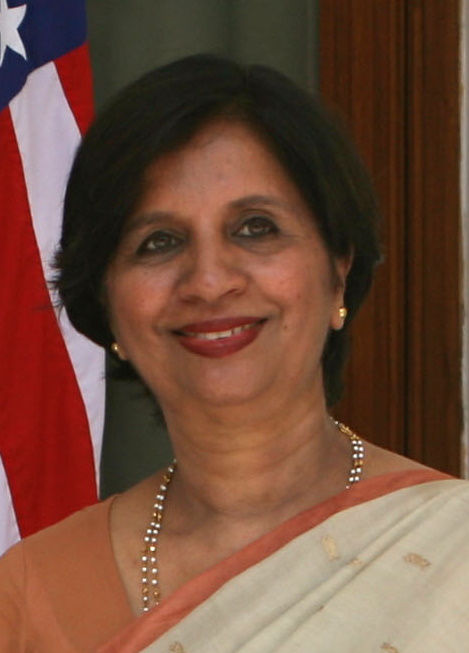
- Rao in 2010

Ambassador of India to the United States of America
- In office 1 August 2011 – 5 November 2013
- Preceded by: Meera Shankar
- Succeeded by: S Jaishankar

28th Foreign Secretary of India
- In office 1 August 2009 – 31 July 2011
- Preceded by: Shivshankar Menon
- Succeeded by: Ranjan Mathai

Ambassador of India to China
- In office 27 October 2006 – 15 July 2009
- Preceded by: Nalin Surie
- Succeeded by: S Jaishankar

High Commissioner of India to Sri Lanka
- In office 1 August 2004 – 30 September 2006
- Preceded by: Nirupam Sen
- Succeeded by: Alok Prasad

Ambassador of India to Peru and Bolivia
- In office December 1995 – May 1998
- Preceded by: T. Cherpoot
- Succeeded by: Butshikan Singh

Official Spokesperson of the Ministry of External Affairs
- In office 2001–2002
- Preceded by: Raminder Jassal
- Succeeded by: Navtej Sarna

Personal details
- Born: 6 December 1950 (age 75) Malappuram, Madras State (present–day Kerala), India
- Website: www.nirupamamenonrao.net

Nirupama Menon Rao (born 6 December 1950) is a retired civil servant of 1973 batch Indian Foreign Service cadre who served as India's Foreign Secretary from 2009 to 2011, as well as being India's Ambassador to the United States, China and Sri Lanka (High Commissioner) during her career.

In July 2009, she became the second woman (after Chokila Iyer) to hold the post of India's Foreign Secretary, the head of the Indian Foreign Service. In her career she served in several capacities including, Minister of Press, Information and Culture in Washington DC, Deputy Chief of Mission in Moscow, stints in the MEA as Joint Secretary, East Asia and External Publicity, the latter position making her the first woman spokesperson of the MEA, Chief of Personnel, Ambassador to Peru and China, and High Commissioner to Sri Lanka.

== Early life and education ==
Nirupama Rao was born in Malappuram, Kerala. Her father, Lt. Colonel P.V.N Menon, was in the Indian Army. Her mother, Meempat Narayanikutty, was the first woman college graduate in her family, obtaining a BA (Hons) Mathematics from Madras University in 1947. Her sisters, Nirmala and Asha, are medical doctors by profession. Nirmala, pursued a career in the Indian Navy, retiring in 2013 as Surgeon Rear Admiral.

Due to her father's profession, Rao schooled in various cities including Bangalore, Pune, Lucknow, and Coonoor. She graduated from Mount Carmel College, Bangalore, with a BA in English in 1970, topping Bangalore University. She was a member of the then Mysore government's youth delegation to Expo 70 in Japan, in September 1970. She then went on to obtain her master's degree in English literature from what was then known as Marathwada University in Maharashtra.

In 1973, Rao topped the All India Civil Services Examination for both the Indian Foreign Service and the Indian Administrative Service, and joined the Indian Foreign Service.

== Career ==
=== Early career ===
On completion of her training at the Lal Bahadur Shastri National Academy of Administration in Mussoorie, she served in the Indian Embassy in Vienna, Austria from 1976 to 1977, where she completed her German language training at the University of Vienna. From 1978 to 1981, Rao served as an Under Secretary on the Southern Africa and Nepal desks, respectively, in the Ministry of External Affairs (MEA) in New Delhi.

In 1981, Rao was posted as First Secretary in the Indian High Commission in Sri Lanka. Here, she witnessed first hand the devastating ethnic riots of July 1983, which marked the beginning of the Sri Lankan Civil War.

After returning to Delhi, Rao specialized in India's relations with China. She served in the MEA's East Asia Division for an unprecedented 8 consecutive years, from 1984 to 1992, eventually becoming Joint Secretary of the division in the late 1980s. In this period, Rao became an expert on the Sino-Indian border dispute and was seen as a key player in the revitalization of Sino-Indian ties. She was a member of the delegation led by Prime Minister Rajiv Gandhi when he made his historic visit to Beijing in December 1988. Her interest in Tibetan affairs was consolidated with visits to the Tibet Autonomous Region, including the leading of a group of Indian pilgrims to the holy sites of Mount Kailash and Lake Mansarovar in August 1986 and a visit to Lhasa and Xigaze in the summer of 1992.

Rao was a Fellow at the Weatherhead Center for International Affairs at Harvard University in 1992–93 where she specialized on Asia-Pacific Security. Her paper on the subject, won the 1994 Bimal Sanyal Prize for the best dissertation written by an IFS officer.

Following her time at Harvard, Rao served as Minister for Press, Information and Culture at the Indian Embassy in Washington D.C. from 1993 to 1995.

=== Ambassador of India to Peru and Bolivia ===
Rao's first Ambassadorship was to Peru with concurrent accreditation to Bolivia, serving from 1995 to 1998. Her tenure saw the first ever visit by a sitting Indian President to Peru, when K.R. Narayanan visited in April/May 1998. This followed Peruvian President Alberto Fujimori's visit to India in May 1997, the last such visit by a Peruvian Head of State. On that visit several agreements of mutual cooperation and two business agreements between the countries were signed.

Rao was present at the Japanese embassy in Lima on 17 December 1996, during a reception to celebrate the birthday of the Japanese Emperor. She left the embassy minutes before it was stormed by a group of Tupac Amaru militants who occupied the embassy for the next four months, holding a number of high-profile hostages.

=== Spokesperson for the Ministry of External Affairs ===
After her tenure in Peru, Rao served as Deputy Chief of Mission at the Indian Embassy in Moscow from 1998 to 1999. Following this posting, she returned to the United States as a Distinguished International Executive in Residence at the University of Maryland at College Park from 1999 to 2000.

In 2001, Rao became the official spokesperson for the MEA with her appointment as Joint Secretary, External Publicity Division (XP). Rao was the first, and so far only, female spokesperson for the MEA.

Rao's tenure as spokesperson coincided with several significant events, including the July 2001 Agra Summit between India and Pakistan, and the December 2001 attack on the Indian Parliament and the subsequent standoff between India and Pakistan. This was a period during which the spokesperson's office gave frequent live briefings for the electronic and print media, both national and international and also began to post the complete transcripts of briefings on the website of the MEA, a practice that has since become institutionalized.

From 2002 to 2004, Rao served as Additional Secretary, Administration (MEA Chief of Personnel). During this period she was also Foreign Service Inspector. In 2003, on the initiative of the then National Security Advisor and Principal Secretary to the Prime Minister, Brajesh Mishra, Rao became a member of the Special Representative's delegation for border talks with China. She participated in the first three rounds of these talks before her departure for Sri Lanka in 2004.

=== High Commissioner for India to Sri Lanka ===
Rao became India's first woman High Commissioner to Sri Lanka in August 2004, replacing Nirupam Sen. Her tenure in Sri Lanka saw the devastating tsunami of December 2004 with Rao overseeing and administering the relief operations launched by India for the affected areas of Sri Lanka, including the war torn North and East of the country where she visited Jaffna, Batticaloa and other towns including relief camps. The Indian Army, Navy and Air Force were extensively involved in the relief operations; they were returning to the island nation for the first time after the withdrawal of the Indian Peace Keeping Force (IPKF) in 1990. The Indian Army's restoration of transportation links in Arugam Bay after the deployment of five Bailey Bridges is particularly remembered. The operations by the Indian Navy to clear the Galle and Colombo harbors after the tsunami won special praise from the Sri Lankan government. The Indian government's relief efforts as first responder after the tsunami were widely praised in Sri Lanka for their promptness, efficacy and reach.

During this period, Rao was also witness to significant internal political developments in Sri Lanka, including the assassination of Foreign Minister Lakshman Kadirgamar (Rao was the last foreigner to see Kadirgamar before his assassination) and the election of Mahinda Rajapaksa as President of the country.

=== Ambassador of India to China ===
In 2006, she became India's first woman Ambassador to China. Her tenure saw state visits by President Hu Jintao to India and Prime Minister Manmohan Singh to China. The Indian Consulate General in Guangzhou was opened during her tenure in October 2007 by the then External Affairs Minister, Pranab Mukherjee. In 2007, Rao took the initiative to expand the Cultural Wing of the Embassy of India, transforming it into a hub for cultural activities including lectures, seminars, music and dance recitals and classes for Chinese students interested in Indian culture. The India-China Business Forum was also set up during this time, enabling a sharper focus on business-related activities concerning trade and investment between India and China.

In 2009, at Rao's initiative, India sponsored a farmers’ training and information center in the far western province of Ningxia, a low income area. This was a first in the history of India-China relations. The construction of an Indian-style Buddhist temple at the ancient town of Luoyang in central China proceeded with rapidity during this period.

Rao's tenure also witnessed the devastating Sichuan earthquake in the summer of 2008, on the eve of the Beijing Olympics. Following this, the Indian government announced relief worth 5 million U.S. dollars for the victims. Rao visited the earthquake affected city of Chengdu soon after the earthquake to coincide with the arrival of Indian Air Force aircraft bringing relief supplies.

Rao's being summoned to the Chinese Ministry of Foreign Affairs at the early hour of 2 a.m. on 21 March 2008 during disturbances in Tibet was the subject of considerable focus and criticism in the Indian media.

=== Foreign Secretary of India ===
Rao became India's second woman Foreign Secretary, succeeding Shivshankar Menon, on 1 August 2009.

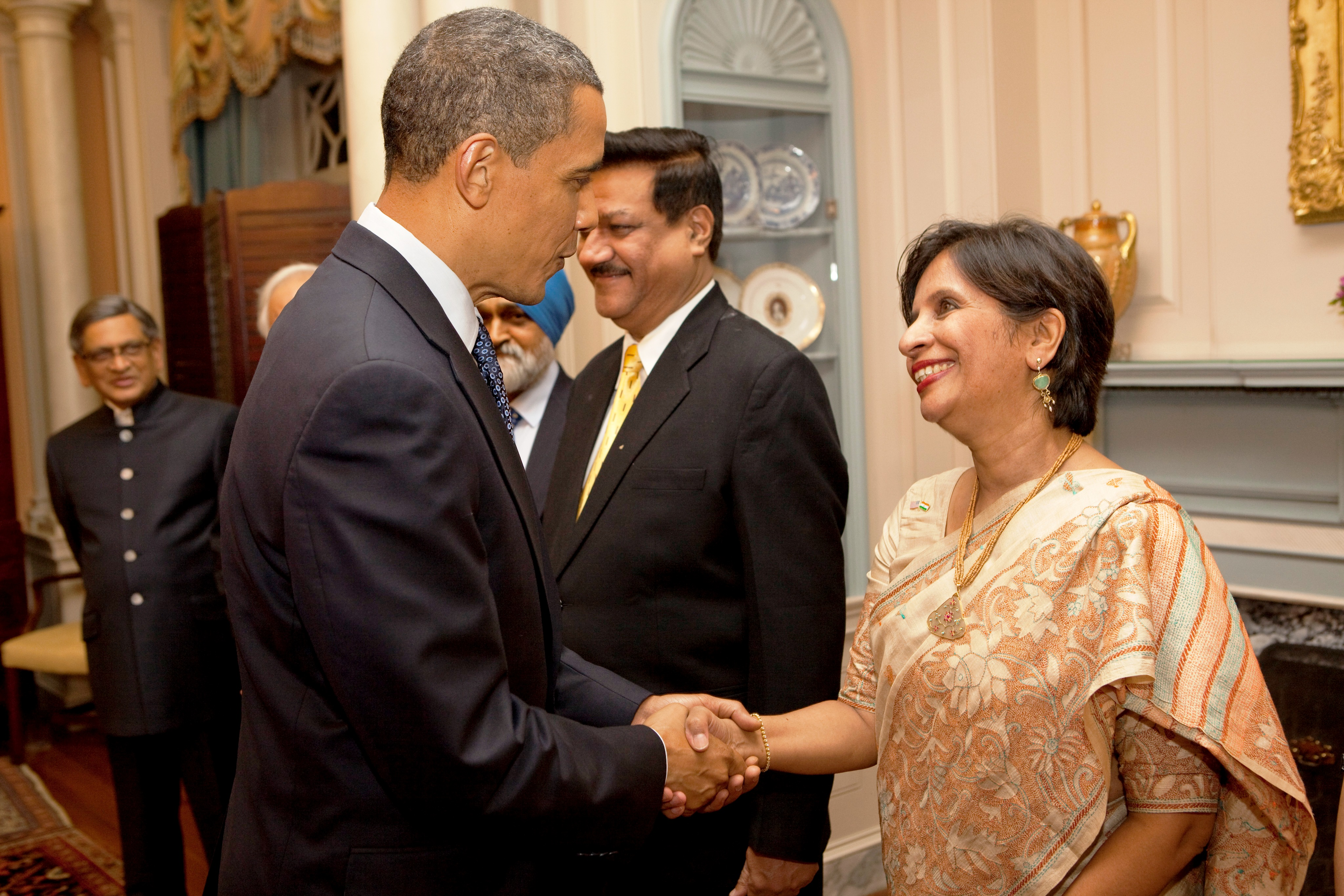
President Obama Shakes Hands With Rao, in Washington, D.C., 2010

On 21 December 2010, the Government of India approved the extension of Rao's tenure as India's Foreign Secretary until 31 July 2011. The two-year tenure for Indian Foreign Secretaries was instituted during Rao's term of office as Foreign Secretary.

During her tenure Rao was active in handling India's relations with its neighbors and with the United States, Russia and Japan, besides multilateral issues including nuclear energy cooperation as well as climate change. In this period, India was elected to a two-year term as non-permanent member of the United Nations Security Council. Rao's handling of India-Pakistan related issues received considerable attention in the media. She was also instrumental in the setting up of the Indian Consulates General in Jaffna and Hambantota in Sri Lanka, with External Affairs Minister S.M. Krishna publicly commending her for her role in the process. Rao also steered two Conferences of Indian Heads of Mission during her tenure.

Rao made special efforts to augment and intensify the activities of the Public Diplomacy Division of the Ministry of External Affairs increasing its outreach significantly. She was a pioneer among senior officers of the Government of India in the use of social media, establishing her Twitter account in February 2011.

During the evacuation of Indians at the time of the Libyan crisis Rao was commended for using her Twitter account (https://twitter.com/NMenonRao) to regularly update the public about the evacuation and also to respond to requests for help from stranded Indians in Libya.

As of June 2019, she has over 1.4 million followers on Twitter.

In 2010, while she was Foreign Secretary, Rao delivered the Harish Mahindra lecture at Harvard University and in 2011, the inaugural lecture for the Singapore Consortium for India-China Dialogue.

=== Ambassador of India to the United States of America ===
She was appointed as Ambassador of India to the US after completion of her tenure as Foreign Secretary. She served a tenure as ambassador in the United States from September 2011 to November 2013.

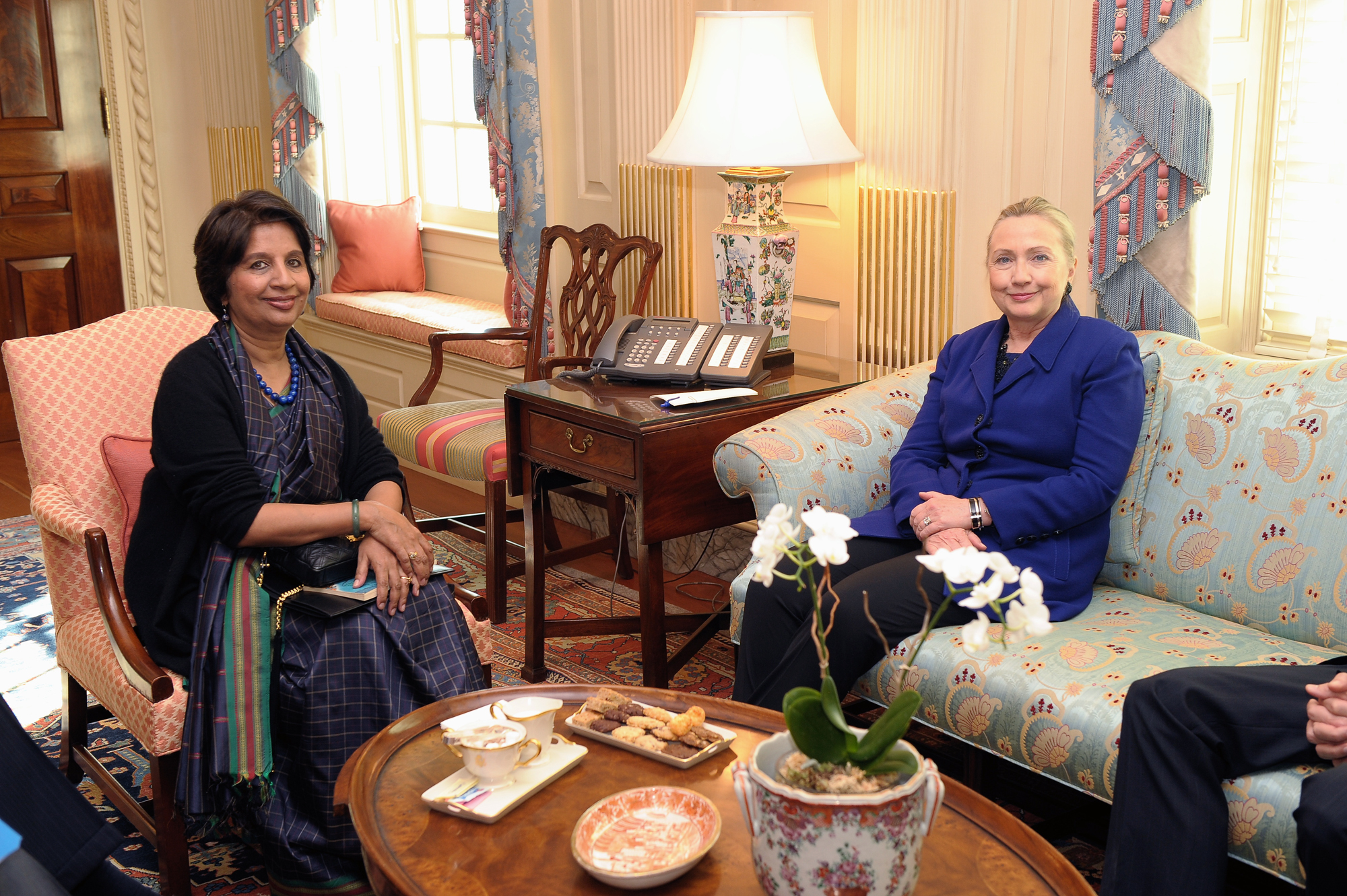
Secretary Clinton Meets With Indian Ambassador Rao, in 2012.

Rao played a strong advocacy role for the bilateral relationship, being active in several public fora, including many leading U.S. universities, radio and TV shows, and in the print media where she authored op-eds on gender issues in India, IPR issues concerning pharmaceuticals, and on the growth of the India-U.S. strategic partnership. She interacted frequently with several Indian American community organizations across the length and breadth of the United States. She was particularly active in her outreach to the members of the Senate and House Caucuses on India and Indian Americans in both Houses of the U.S. Congress.

This period also saw the visit of Prime Minister Manmohan Singh to Washington in September 2013, two meetings of the India-U.S. Strategic Dialogue, and several ministerial-level interactions between the two countries.

One of her specific mission goals was to see the actualization of a long-standing goal for India to acquire a property for housing an Indian Cultural Center in Washington. Her tenure saw the purchase by the Indian Government (ending a quest that had lasted for close to four decades) of a property in downtown Washington D.C. to house the Center. Rao had consistently held that the fascination in the United States for Indian culture, the arts and letters of India, music and dance could be effectively leveraged to secure a deeper understanding and partnership. During her term, the Indian Embassy residence in Washington became a hub of several high-profile cultural events drawing the elite of the city to the Embassy and thereby significantly enhancing India's outreach in the city. Her efforts also led to the inscribing of the Embassy residence in the register of historical (heritage) residences in the upscale Cleveland Park neighborhood of the city.

== Post-Retirement ==
=== Fellowships and Teaching Positions ===
On the completion of her tenure as Ambassador of India to the United States in November 2013, Brown University announced that Nirupama Rao would be the Meera and Vikram Gandhi Fellow in residence at the University during 2014. During the year, Rao was engaged in research on Sino-Indian diplomatic relations for what would eventually become her first work of historical non-fiction (The Fractured Himalaya: India Tibet China 1949-1962) and in writing on select foreign policy issues.

In November 2014, the Jawaharlal Nehru Memorial Fund, New Delhi announced the conferment of the prestigious Jawaharlal Nehru Fellowship on Nirupama Rao in connection with her research for The Fractured Himalaya.

Following the completion of these fellowships, Rao taught at Brown University in 2015 and 2016, leading a seminar course titled "India in the World". The course covered several key areas of India's foreign policy and global interaction. In 2017, Rao was named a Public Policy Fellow at the Woodrow Wilson International Center for Scholars in Washington D.C., affiliated with the center's Asia Program. As part of the fellowship, Rao spent three months in residence at the Wilson Center where she continued her research for The Fractured Himalaya. Rao continues to be involved with the Wilson Center, serving on the Board of Advisors for the Asia Program.

In 2018, Rao was named the George Ball Adjunct Professor for the fall semester at the School of International and Public Affairs (SIPA) at Columbia University. In 2019, she was a Pacific Leadership Fellow at the University of California, San Diego.

=== Advisory and Board Positions ===
Post her retirement from the Indian Foreign Service, Rao has served on various corporate boards in India including Adani Ports, ITC, JSW Steel, KEC International, Coromandel International, Network 18 Media & Investments, TV18 Broadcast, Max Financial Services, Viacom 18. She is also currently a member of the Council of the Indian Institute of Science, Bangalore and the International Crisis Group (since 2024).

== Publications ==
Rao's first published work was a collection of her English language poems titled Rain Rising, which was released in India in 2004 by Rupa Publications. A Malayalam translation of the book was released by Calicut University in June 2013 and a select number of poems from the collection have also been translated into Chinese (Mandarin) and Russian.

=== The Fractured Himalaya: India Tibet China 1949-1962 ===
Rao's first work of nonfiction, The Fractured Himalaya: India Tibet China 1949-1962, was released in October 2021 by Penguin Random House India. A detailed account of the formative years of the diplomatic relationship between independent India and the People's Republic of China, the book is written from a diplomat-practitioner's lens and draws from archival research on the subject as well as Rao's personal experience covering the relationship during her professional career.

The Fractured Himalaya was met with critical acclaim upon its release, with many reviews considering it an authoritative work on the early diplomatic relations between India and the PRC. Critics especially praised the book's emphasis on Tibet as an independent political and socio-cultural entity and its crucial role in the evolution of the India-China relationship prior to the Sino-Indian conflict of 1962.

== Awards and honours ==
During her tenure as Foreign Secretary, Rao received the KPS Menon Award (in 2010) and the Sree Chithira Thirunal Award (in 2011) for her achievements as a career diplomat. In May 2012, Rao was conferred the degree of Doctor of Letters (Honoris Causa) by Pondicherry University at their Convocation. In 2012, she was included in the list of the One Hundred Most Influential Women on Twitter by ForeignPolicy.com. In February 2016, Rao received the Vanitha Rathnam Award from the Government of Kerala.

== See also ==
- S. Jaishankar
- Shivshankar Menon
- Harsh Vardhan Shringla
- Vijay Gokhale

Diplomatic posts
Preceded by Meera Shankar	Indian Ambassador to the United States; 2011–2013	Succeeded by S. Jaishankar
Preceded by Shivshankar Menon	Foreign Secretary of India; 2009–2011	Succeeded by Ranjan Mathai
Preceded by Nalin Surie	Ambassador of India to China; 2006–2009	Succeeded by S. Jaishankar
