= Navtej Sarna =

Indian diplomat (born 1957)

His Excellency Navtej Sarna, IFS
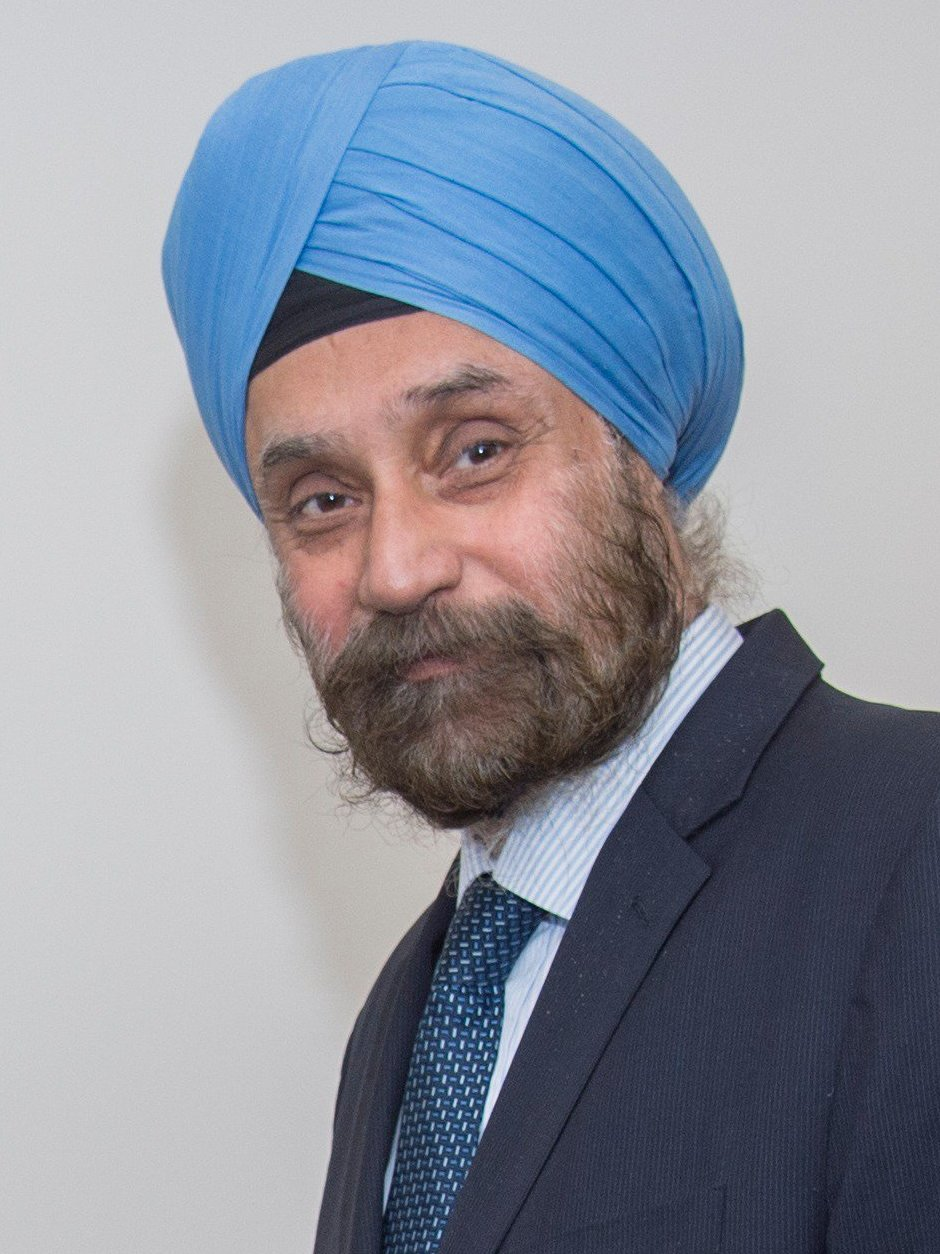

Indian Ambassador to the United States
- In office November 2016 – December 2018
- Preceded by: Arun Kumar Singh
- Succeeded by: Harsh Vardhan Shringla

High Commissioner of India to the United Kingdom
- In office January 2016 – December 2016
- Preceded by: Ranjan Mathai
- Succeeded by: Yashvardhan Kumar Sinha

Ambassador of India to Israel
- In office November 2008 – August 2012
- Preceded by: Arun Kumar Singh
- Succeeded by: Jaideep Sarkar

Official Spokesperson of the Ministry of External Affairs
- In office 2002–2008
- Preceded by: Nirupama Rao
- Succeeded by: Vishnu Prakash

Personal details
- Born: Navtej Singh Sarna; 1957 (age 68–69) Jalandhar, Punjab, India
- Parent(s): Mohinder Singh Sarna and Surjit Sarna
- Education: B.Com Hons; LL.B.
- Alma mater: St.Joseph's Academy, Dehradun; Shri Ram College of Commerce; Faculty of Law, University of Delhi
- Occupation: Diplomat and Author

Navtej Singh Sarna (born 1957) is an Indian author and retired diplomat of Indian Foreign Service who served as the Indian Ambassador to the United States. He previously served as the High Commissioner of India to the United Kingdom, and the Ambassador to Israel. He has published three novels and many short stories and essays of literary criticism.

== Early life and career ==
Navtej Singh Sarna was born in 1957 in Jalandhar, Punjab, India to noted writer in Punjabi, Mohinder Singh Sarna and Punjabi poet and translator Surjit Sarna, and did his schooling from St. Joseph's Academy, Dehradun. Later he joined the Indian Foreign Service in 1980. He was the longest-serving spokesperson of the Indian Foreign Ministry (six years), under two prime ministers, three foreign ministers and four foreign secretaries, till the end of his term in September, 2008.

Previously as a diplomat served in Moscow, Warsaw, Thimphu, Geneva, Teheran and Washington, DC. He served as India's ambassador to Israel from 2008 to 2012, High Commissioner to the UK 2016 and as India's ambassador to the United States from November 2016 to December 2018 and retired from the Indian Foreign Service on 31 December 2018, after serving his country for over 36 years.

== Writing career ==
Navtej Sarna's first novel published was We Weren't Lovers Like That in 2003, followed by The Book of Nanak was published in the same year. The Exile, published in 2008, is a novel based on the life of Duleep Singh, the last Maharaja of the Sikh Empire, and son of Maharaja Ranjit Singh. His short stories which appeared earlier in the London Magazine and broadcast over BBC have been put together in the collection 'Winter Evenings.' He translated the 'Zafarnama', the letter written in Persian verse by Guru Gobind Singh to emperor Aurungzeb. 'Savage Harvest' is Sarna's translation of thirty of his father's short stories on the partition of India from Punjabi to English. Sarna has also contributed extensively to journals and newspapers in India and abroad including The Financial Times, Times Literary Supplement, The Hindu, Hindustan Times, etc. His literary columns written over seven years for The Hindu have now appeared as a book entitled 'Second Thoughts on Books, Authors and the Writerly Life. He received the Sahitya Akademi Award 2025 in the English language category for his novel Crimson Spring. The novel is based on the 1919 Jallianwala Bagh massacre.

== Personal life ==
Ambassador Sarna speaks English, Hindi and Punjabi and also has knowledge of Russian and Polish. He is married to Dr. Avina Sarna and has one son and one daughter.

== Publications ==
- Folk Tales of Poland, Sterling Publications, 1991. ISBN 81-207-1072-X.
- The Book of Nanak, Penguin, September 2003. ISBN 0-670-04978-6.

== See also ==
- Harsh V Shringla
- Vijay Gokhale
- Taranjit Singh Sandhu
- Dr. Subrahmanyam Jaishankar
