= List of ambassadors of India to the United Arab Emirates =

Ambassador of India to the United Arab Emirates
- Incumbent; Dr. Deepak Mittal since 2 September 2025
- Nominator: Droupadi Murmu
- Inaugural holder: S. E. H. Rizvi
- Formation: 1973; 53 years ago
- Website: Embassy of India, Abu Dhabi., UAE

The Indian Ambassador to the United Arab Emirates is the chief diplomatic representative of the Republic of India to the United Arab Emirates, housed in Abu Dhabi.

== List of Indian ambassadors to the United Arab Emirates ==
List of Indian Ambassadors to UAE

Name	Entered office	Left office
S. E. H. Rizvi	28 June 1973	31 May 1976
Mohammad Hamid Ansari	6 June 1976	24 January 1980
Lalit Mansingh	29 January 1980	17 January 1983
Ishrat Aziz	14 February 1983	11 December 1986
O.P Goel	21 December 1986	5 November 1993
M.P.M. Menon	21 July 1994	16 December 1998
Krishan Chander Singh	18 March 1999	23 August 2003
Sudhir Vyas	24 August 2003	12 June 2005
C. M. Bhandari	25 June 2005	1 July 2007
Talmiz Ahmad	7 August 2007	23 January 2010
M. K. Lokesh	11 April 2010	17 December 2013
T. P. Seetharam	29 December 2013	31 December 2016
Navdeep Singh Suri	2017	31 August 2019
Pavan Kapoor	31 October 2019	21 November 2021
Sunjay Sudhir	26 November 2021	September 2, 2025
Dr. Deepak Mittal	2 September 2025	Incumbent

== See also ==
Embassy of India, Abu Dhabi
