= India–United Arab Emirates relations =

- India: United Arab Emirates

Diplomatic mission
- Embassy of India, Abu Dhabi: Embassy of the United Arab Emirates, New Delhi

Envoy
- Ambassador Sunjay Sudhir: Ambassador Ahmed Al-Banna

India–United Arab Emirates relations are the bilateral relations that exist between the Republic of India and the United Arab Emirates. Since 3000 B.C., India and the UAE, including its precursor emirates, have maintained close relations through ancient trade networks. Sumerians traded with Meluhha (Indus Valley), Magan (UAE and Oman), and Dilmun (Bahrain), connecting through the UAE. Maritime routes facilitated Arab trade with India for silk, spices, gold, and porcelain. Post-1971, India-UAE relations strengthened politically, economically, and culturally.

They are both in I2U2 Group. Indians make up the largest ethnic group in the UAE, making up roughly 38% of UAE's total residents. India is UAE's largest exports destination and trading partner, with bilateral trade turnover of US$68.4 billion during the calendar year 2021. UAE's exports to India totaled US$43.04 billion, while India's exports to the UAE totaled US$25.4 billion. In 2022, India and UAE signed a Comprehensive Economic Partnership Agreement (CEPA) to take bilateral trade to US$100 billion within 5 years.

India and the UAE have strengthened defense cooperation since 2003, marked by joint exercises like Desert Eagle and Gulf Star-1. The Annual Defense Dialogue and high-level visits have played pivotal roles. Counter-terrorism collaboration, including successful operations against terrorists, has been a focus since 2014. Notably, in December 2020, India and the UAE thwarted a terrorist attack in Delhi. India and the UAE, since 2014, have deepened ties with various agreements. PM Modi and President Al Nahyan's rapport is highlighted. Plans include the first overseas IIT and a Hindu temple in Abu Dhabi, symbolizing harmony, which was inaugurated on February 14, 2024.

Commentators see the United Arab Emirates as an increasingly important partner to India. According to the Middle East Forum, the relationship between the countries has improved from transactional procurement to a structured industrial and operational collaboration.

== History ==
=== Early years ===
Since 3000 B.C, relations between India and the seven emirates which now make up the United Arab Emirates were traditionally close. In ancient times, the Sumerians engaged in a vibrant trade network with three significant centers—Meluhha (most scholars identified as the Indus Valley Civilization, present-day Indian subcontinent), Magan (Oman and parts of the UAE), and Dilmun (Bahrain and parts of Saudi Arabia). Mesopotamian records reveal that Meluhha was a source of coveted goods like ivory and carnelian, while the UAE, particularly through its sheikhdoms, played a crucial role in connecting the trade routes. The seafarers navigated the oceans, enabling the Arabs to trade silk, spices, gold, and porcelain. Notably, the discovery of a direct route from the Red Sea to India by Hippalus in the first century BC enhanced commercial transactions, connecting Red Sea ports to Indian kingdoms. Evidence of this ancient trade persists, with discoveries of valuable goods and spices in Roman settlements along Egypt's Red Sea coast, highlighting the historical ties between India and the UAE.

The UAE and India enjoyed close and friendly ties based on historic and cultural ties. People-to-people contacts and barter trade for clothes and spices from India in exchange for dates and pearls from the region have existed for centuries. After the creation of the federation in 1971, India-UAE relations flourished. Today UAE and India share political, economic, and cultural links. There are over a million Indians in the United Arab Emirates, being by far the largest migrant group in the country.

=== 21st century ===
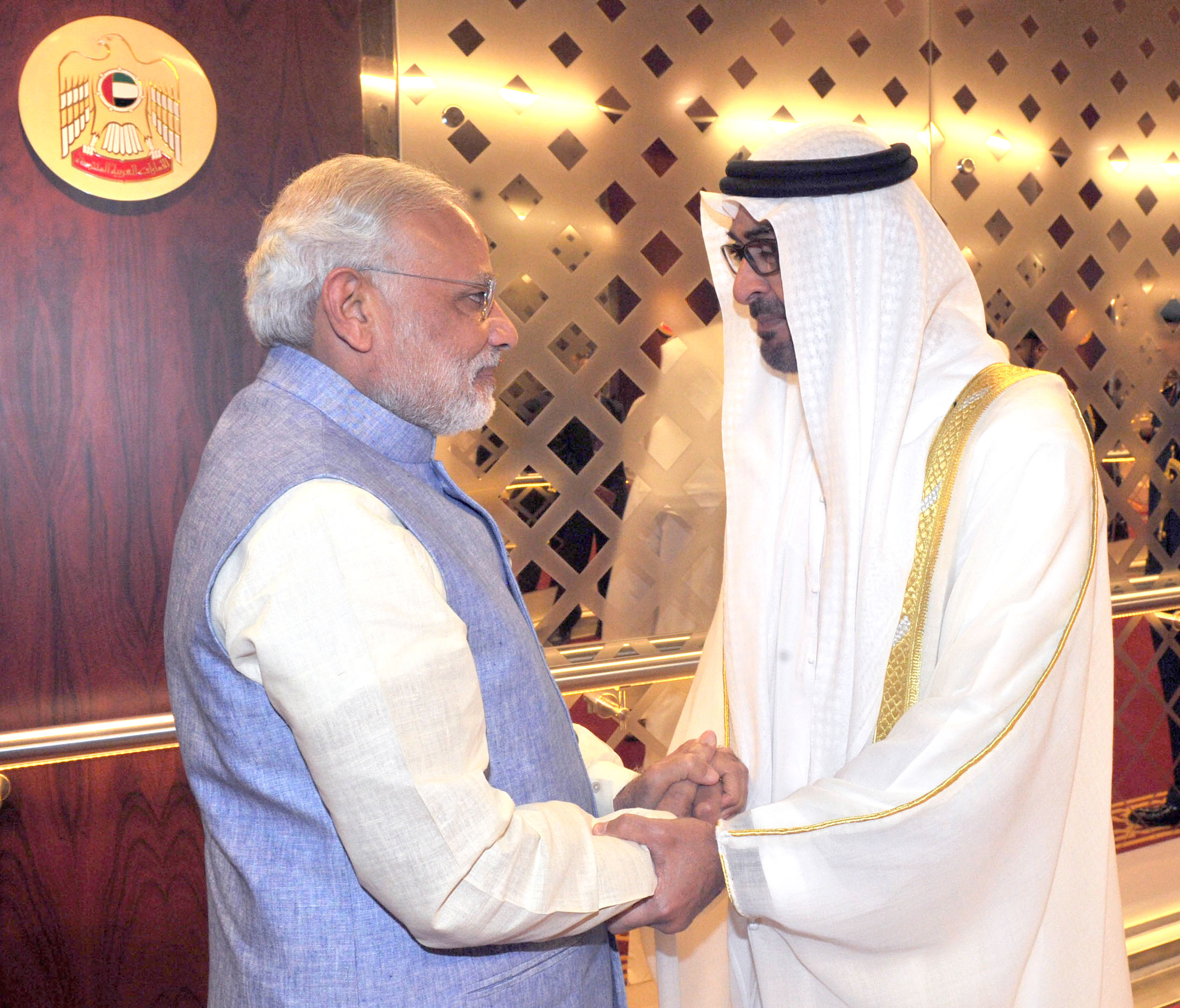
Prime Minister Narendra Modi being received by Abu Dhabi Crown Prince Mohammed bin Zayed Al Nahyan

On 16 August 2015, Prime Minister Narendra Modi began a two-day visit to the UAE, the first state visit by an Indian prime minister to the country in 34 years. In 2018, a Memorandum of Understanding (MoU) was signed between India and the UAE on Technical Cooperation in the Rail Sector. It provided a platform for Indian Railways to interact and share their latest developments and knowledge in the railway sector. On 18 August 2018, Modi described Sheikh Mohammed's humanitarian support for those affected by the Kerala floods that year as "[reflecting] the special ties between governments and people of India and UAE". On 6 August 2019, the UAE backed the decision of the Indian government to pursue passage of the 2019 Jammu and Kashmir Reorganisation Bill, with the UAE's Ambassador to India stating: "We expect that the changes would improve social justice and security and confidence of the people in the local governance and will encourage further stability and peace." In August, 2021, UAE and India signed an agreement under which faculty members from Indian universities will spend six to 10 months every year for undertaking research and teaching social sciences in Abu Dhabi. This agreement was aimed at deepening the academic and cultural ties between the two nations.

In January 2024, Mohamed bin Zayed Al Nahyan visited India to participate in Vibrant Gujarat Summit 2024. As a special gesture PM Modi personally received the UAE president and held a road show in Ahmedabad.

On 19 January 2026, Mohamed bin Zayed Al Nahyan once again visited India and left after three hours. The visit concluded with India signing a $3 billion LNG supply deal with the United Arab Emirates, doubling bilateral trade to $200 billion within six years, and signing a letter of intent for defence partnership.

On 15 May 2026, during a visit to the UAE, Indian Prime Minister Narendra Modi called for an "open and safe" Strait of Hormuz amid disruptions caused by the Iran war. The two sides also agreed to explore increasing UAE's ADNOC oil storage in India to up to 30 million barrels and to store crude at Fujairah port as part of India's strategic petroleum reserve.

== Economic relations ==
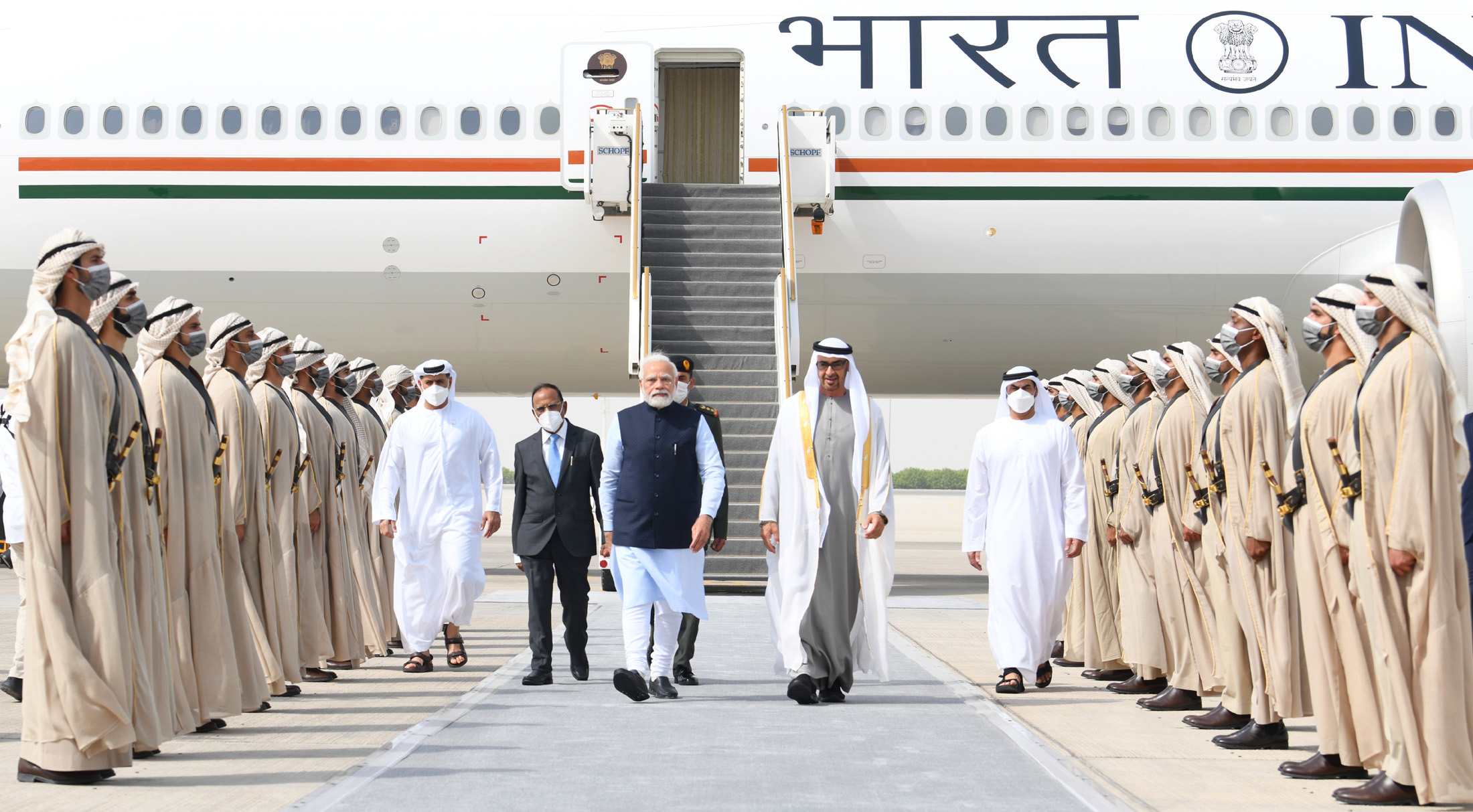
PM Narendra Modi being welcomed by the UAE President Sheikh Mohamed bin Zayed Al Nahyan at the Abu Dhabi Airport on 28 June 2022

The UAE is India's top trading partner in the entire West Asia and North Africa region. According to journalist Ravi S. Jha, Indian exports to the UAE account for 6% of India's global exports. In 2008–09, India emerged as the largest trade partner of the UAE with bilateral trade between the two countries exceeding US$44.5 billion. In 2018–19, India-UAE bilateral trade grew by over 20% and India's exports to UAE grew by 7% whereas the UAE's exports to India surged by 37% to reach US$29.78 billion.

Though India and the UAE are two fast-growing economies from Asia, bilateral trade between them has not kept pace with the economic growth in the region, with trade falling to US$49.3 billion in 2016 from about US$67 billion in 2013. During the Indian PM Narendra Modi's visit to the UAE in February 2018, both sides signed a landmark agreement to conduct trade directly in their local currencies eliminating the need for US dollars which would significantly boost trade. Both leaders also set a target of US$100 billion in bilateral trade by 2020. In the financial year 2018–19, India-UAE bilateral trade grew by over 20% to reach US$59.9 billion. India's exports to the UAE grew by 7% to US$30.13 billion, whereas the UAE's exports to India surged by 37% to reach US$29.78 billion.

An underwater rail tunnel linking the UAE with the western coast of India was proposed in 2018. The proposed tunnel would be supported by pontoons and be nearly 2,000 kilometres in length. India had a four-story pavilion at Dubai Expo 2020 showcasing business opportunities and its global push towards attracting investors for its projected US$5 trillion economy. The pavilion, one of the largest among 190 countries, featured Indian brands and multinational companies, including Reliance Industries and Adani Group. India's rising unicorns and startups were a major attraction for global investors, and at least 13 states participated at the Dubai Expo.

The Comprehensive Economic Partnership Agreement being negotiated with the UAE was expected to help in sealing at least US$100 billion in trade. Following the implementation of CEPA, total bilateral trade exceeded the initial US$100 billion target, leading both nations to establish expanded benchmarks: a target of US$100 billion in non-oil trade by 2030 and an overall trade goal of US$200 billion by 2032. In 2023, the UAE and Saudi Arabia joined BRICS. At the G20 Summit 2023 a memorandum of understanding on the India-Middle East-Europe Economic Corridor, or IMEC, was signed by the European Union, India, Saudi Arabia, the United Arab Emirates, the U.S. 2023 also saw an agreement to allow bilateral trade to use Indian rupees, rather than US dollars.

The UAE has invested over US$25 billion in India between 2000 and 2026, making up for more than 70% of all Gulf investments into India. A large proportion of the investments came from Abu Dhabi's sovereign wealth funds like Abu Dhabi Investment Authority, Mubadala Investment Company, and ADQ. During the India-UAE High-Level Joint Task Force on Investments meeting in September 2026, the UAE indicated that it will invest another US$25 billion in India in the near future, declaring a longer term total investment target of US$100 billion.

== Golden Visa Initiative and Bilateral Engagement ==
In 2025, the United Arab Emirates introduced a new nomination-based Golden Visa scheme, signaling deepening ties with India. Unlike the earlier model requiring a minimum property investment of AED 2 million, the new system allows selected Indian nationals to obtain a lifetime UAE Golden Visa by paying a one-time fee of AED 100,000 (approx. INR 23.3 lakh).

This initiative highlights growing strategic and people-to-people cooperation between India and the UAE. Over 5,000 Indians are expected to apply during the first phase, which includes India and Bangladesh as pilot nations. The Raya Group, led by Managing Director Rayad Kamal Ayub, has been authorized to oversee background checks—including criminal history, anti-money laundering compliance, and potential contributions to the UAE’s sectors like trade, science, and culture.

Applications can be processed from India without requiring a physical visit to the UAE, through One Vasco Centres, registered offices, or online platforms. The nomination-based Golden Visa offers long-term residency benefits, including the ability to sponsor family members and domestic staff, with no dependency on real estate ownership. The move is widely seen as a step towards enhancing mobility, fostering bilateral economic integration, and strengthening UAE–India amity in alignment with their growing strategic partnership.

== Space exploration ==
India and the UAE have engaged in collaborative efforts in the field of space exploration through the cooperation of the UAE Space Agency (UAESA) and the Indian Space Research Organization (ISRO). The collaboration gained momentum during Prime Minister Modi's 2015 visit to the Emirates. The joint initiatives include the development and launch of the nano-satellite Nayif-1 from the Satish Dhavan Space Centre in Sriharikota, India. Furthermore, there is a likelihood of continued collaboration on the Emirates' Red Planet Mission.' K. Radhakrishna, former head of ISRO, played a key role in the development of the Emirates’ Mars Hope Probe, which was successfully launched in July 2020 from the Tanegashima Space Centre.

== Security relations ==
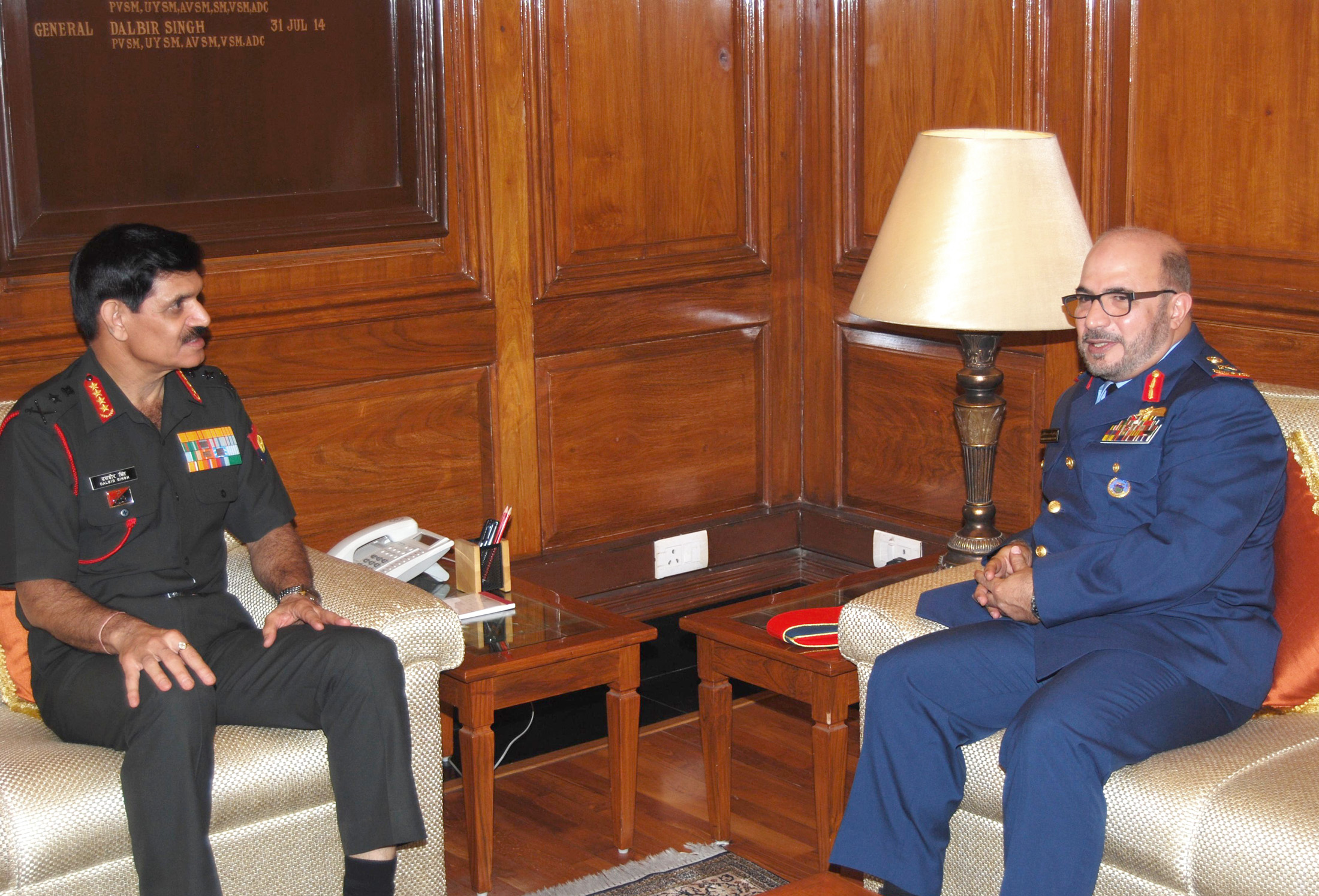
Major General Staff Pilot Ibrahim Nasser M Al Alawi, Commander UAE Air Force & Air Defence calling on the Chief of Army Staff, General Dalbir Singh, in New Delhi on September 01, 2014

Defense cooperation between India and the UAE has seen growth since 2003, when the chief of staff of the UAE armed forces visited India. The subsequent exchanges resulted in the initiation of the Desert Eagle bilateral exercises involving the Indian Air Force (IAF) and the UAE Air Force (UAE-AF). These exercises have contributed to enhancing the security preparedness and coordination between India and the UAE. Additionally, the inaugural joint naval exercise, Gulf Star-1, after held in 2018, established a foundation for maritime security cooperation between the two nations. The Annual Defense Dialogue has played a crucial role in fostering defense cooperation, with a Joint Defense Cooperation Committee at the Ministry level and Naval Staff Talks at the HQ level overseeing these efforts. Notably, a substantial delegation from the UAE Ministry of Defense participated in the Aero India event in Bengaluru in February 2019. In December of the same year, India's Vice Chief of Air Staff led a delegation to the 9th Dubai International Air Chiefs’ Conference and Air Show.

Since 2014, India has worked with the UAE on various counter-terrorism issues. On 4 March 2018, the Indian Coast Guard and Emirati special forces collaborated in a successful operation, requested by Emirati Prime Minister Sheikh Mohammed bin Rashid Al Maktoum, and approved by Indian prime minister Narendra Modi, to intercept a yacht carrying Latifa bint Mohammed Al Maktoum. In December 2020, Indian authorities in coordination with UAE had foiled a Pakistani ISI backed-terrorist attack in Delhi. The arrested terrorists consisted of 2 Khalistani and 3 Hizbul Mujahideen members. The head of the cell was arrested in the UAE and deported to India. Both countries conducted their first military exercise named Desert Cyclone together in Rajasthan on January 4, 2024.

In January 2026, when UAE President Sheikh Mohamed bin Zayed Al Nahyan was on a state visit to India, the two countries had signed a letter of intent to work towards concluding a framework agreement for a strategic defence partnership. In April 2025 the institutional framework of defence dialogue was elevated to the level of Secretaries and Vice Ministers. In May 2026, the Agreement on the Framework for the Strategic Defence Partnership between the Emirati Ministry of Defence and the Indian Ministry of Defence was exchanged by Lieutenant General Ibrahim Nasser Al Alawi and Foreign Secretary Vikram Misri. Both India and UAE took the initiative to pursue joint manufacturing of weapons including production models like the collaboration between India's ICOMM and the UAE's CARACAL for small arms while targeting joint production in high-tech defence areas such as unmanned aerial vehicles (UAVs), missiles, naval platforms, artificial intelligence and precision munitions.

In October 2026, the Indian Army and the United Arab Emirates Army conducted Exercise Mountain Guardian 2026, a 14-day joint bilateral military exercise held from October 5 to 18 at the Foreign Training Node in Chaubatia, Uttarakhand. The exercise involved 92 personnel divided equally between India's Bhairav Battalion and the UAE's Mountain Infantry Battalion. Aimed at strengthening tactical cooperation and high-altitude operational capabilities, the training covered mountain-craft, rock climbing, rappelling, slithering, marksmanship, and technology-enabled mountain warfare tactics.

== Technological and scientific collaboration ==
India and UAE are closely involved in polar cooperation. In January 2026, Emirati researchers from Khalifa University joined India's 45th Antarctic Expedition at the Maitri Research Station to explore Antarctica's landscapes for the advancement of polar & planetary science.

In May 2026, a Term Sheet was exchanged between G42 Group, Mohamed bin Zayed University of Artificial Intelligence and C-DAC to establish an 8-exaflop supercomputing cluster in India.

== Cultural relations ==
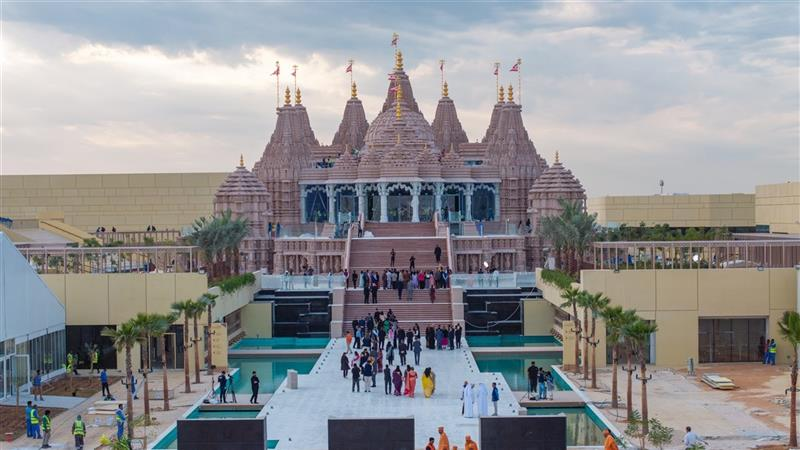
Visitors at newly constructed BAPS Hindu Mandir at Abu Dhabi.

In 1975, the UAE and India signed an agreement to deepen their cultural ties. Both countries agreed to cooperate in art, culture, and education, including academic activity in science and technology, sports, public health, and mass media.

There are currently over 3 million Indians living in the UAE. Immigration has been highly active since the 1960s. Most of the people who migrated are from the southern states of India. Since 2014, both countries have signed multiple agreements and have increased their cooperation in various fields. Diplomats have emphasized the bonhomie between Prime Minister Narendra Modi and President Sheikh Mohamed Bin Zayed Al Nahyan for close cooperation between the countries. In a joint statement given in February 2022, there was a proposal to establish the first overseas IIT.

As a symbol of growing relations between the two countries, a BAPS Hindu Mandir is constructed in Abu Dhabi. The temple has been projected as a symbol of harmony by the two countries. The temple was built by BAPS Swaminarayan Sanstha and was inaugurated on February 14, 2024, in the presence of Prime Minister Narendra Modi. Before the inauguration, Prime Minister Modi symbolically offered water in the virtual Ganga and Yamuna rivers within the temple premises. Emphasizing values of harmony and peace, Prime Minister Modi stated that the BAPS temple stands as a lasting tribute to shared values between India and the UAE. The consecration ceremony took place on a 27-acre plot with the pink sandstone temple being one of the largest in the Middle East.
