= A Forgotten Ambassador in Cairo =

Ambassador of India

- Author: N.S. Vinodh
- Language: Indian English
- Genre: Biography
- Published: 29 December 2020
- Publisher: Simon and Schuster India
- Publication place: India
- ISBN: 9788194752028

A Forgotten Ambassador in Cairo: The Life and Times of Syud Hossain is a biography of Syud Hossain - who was a journalist, an Indian independence activist, and the first ever Indian ambassador to Egypt - written by N.S. Vinodh and published by Simon and Schuster India in 2020.

== Overview ==
Born to a nawabi family of Dhaka, Hossain was a journalist and the editor of The Independent, nationalist newspaper started by Indian Independence activist Motilal Nehru. During this time period, while staying in Allahabad, he got attracted to Motilal's daughter Sarup Nehru (also known as Vijaya Lakshmi Pandit, a sister of Independent India's first PM Jawaharlal Nehru), and eloped with her and subsequently secretly married.

Under pressure of Motilal Nehru and Mahatma Gandhi, Hossain annulled his marriage and he was further advised to stay away from the country for a few years. He went to the United States, where he proliferated the message of the Mahatma, and later fought for Indian immigrant rights in the US, resulting into Luce–Celler Act of 1946, which paved the way for the second mass immigration.

After India's independence, he was appointed as the first ambassador of India to Egypt. Next year, he was appointedas the first Minister of India to Transjordan and also the first Indian Minister to Lebanon. In 1949, at the age of 61, he died during service and buried in Cairo.

== Reception ==
Writing for an Indian online portal The Wire, Talmiz Ahmad, a former Indian diplomat, referred the book as "both a labour of love and an outstanding piece of painstaking research." The book, Ahmad wrote, is "a reflection of the author’s wide travel, his commitment to the book project, his dogged pursuit of source material, his clarity of thought, and, above all, his lucid style."

Neha Kirpal, in a review for The New Indian Express, referred this book as "a fitting tribute" to Syud Hossain. The book, in her opinion, "narrates episodes of his life against the backdrop of the Indian independence movement" and "is filled with interesting anecdotes".

Syud Marghub Murshed, a former civil servant of Bangladesh, in a review for Bangladeshi daily The Daily Star, noted that Vinodh "has made a valuable addition to our corpus of knowledge of the history of 20th century South Asia" with this book. He recommended "it highly to readers of historical literature."

The book was listed into Hindustan Times' and Indian Express' lists in January 2021 and also into a list of Firstpost in December 2020.
