= BAPS Hindu Mandir Abu Dhabi =

Traditional Hindu temple in UAE

BAPS Hindu Mandir
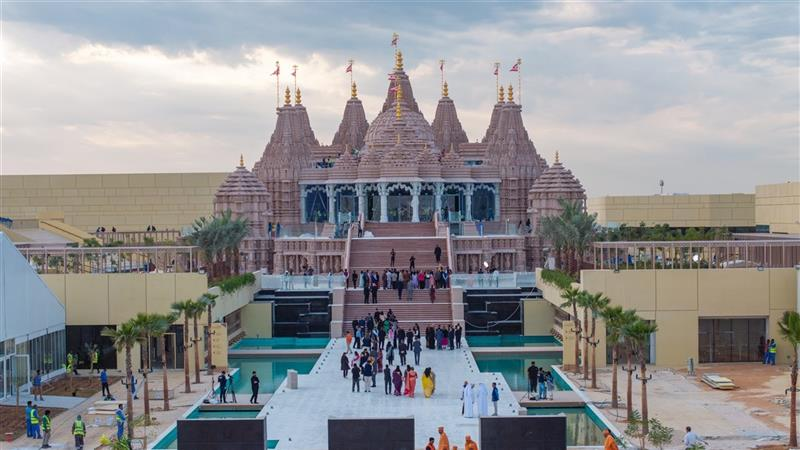
- BAPS Hindu Mandir, Abu Dhabi

Religion
- Affiliation: Hinduism
- Sect: BAPS Swaminarayan Sanstha
- Region: Abu Dhabi
- Deity: Akshar Purushottam

Location
- Country: United Arab Emirates
- Interactive map of BAPS Hindu Mandir
- Coordinates: 24°36′59.4″N 54°43′54.7″E

Architecture
- Founder: Mahant Swami Maharaj
- Creator: BAPS Swaminarayan Sanstha
- Completed: 14 February 2024
- Site area: 27 acre

Website
- mandir.ae

The BAPS Hindu Mandir Abu Dhabi is a traditional Hindu mandir built by the BAPS Swaminarayan Sanstha, in Abu Dhabi, United Arab Emirates (UAE). Inspired by Pramukh Swami Maharaj (1921–2016) and consecrated (transl. murti pratishtha) by Mahant Swami Maharaj on 14 February 2024, it is the first traditional Hindu mandir in Abu Dhabi and the largest Hindu mandir in West Asia. It recorded over 2.2 million visitors in its inaugural year.

Pramukh Swami Maharaj envisioned a mandir in Abu Dhabi in 1997. In 2015, Sheikh Mohammed bin Zayed Al Nahyan, the Crown Prince of Abu Dhabi, gifted 27 acres of land for the project. Construction commenced in December 2019 at Abu Mureikhah, near the Dubai-Abu Dhabi Sheikh Zayed Highway, with over 2,000 artisans crafting the stonework in India and more than 200 volunteers from around the world contributing over 690,000 hours.

The mandir is constructed from Rajasthani pink sandstone and Italian marble, standing 108 feet tall, 262 feet long, and 180 feet wide. It features seven shikhars symbolizing the seven Emirates and houses seven shrines dedicated to Swaminarayan and Gunatitanand Swami, Radha-Krishna, Sita-Rama, Shiva-Parvati, Venkateshwara, Jagannath, and Ayyappan.

The mandir has become a symbol of interfaith harmony: the land was donated by a Muslim crown prince, the lead architect was Christian, the construction manager was Sikh, and the foundation designer was Buddhist. Its carvings draw from the Ramayana, Shiva Purana, Bhagavatam, Mahabharata, and alongside Arabian, Egyptian, Mesopotamian, and Native American traditions. The mandir complex includes the traditional Hindu mandir, a visitor centre, prayer halls, exhibitions, learning areas, sports area for children, thematic gardens, water features, a food court, and a books and gift shop.

== Deities ==
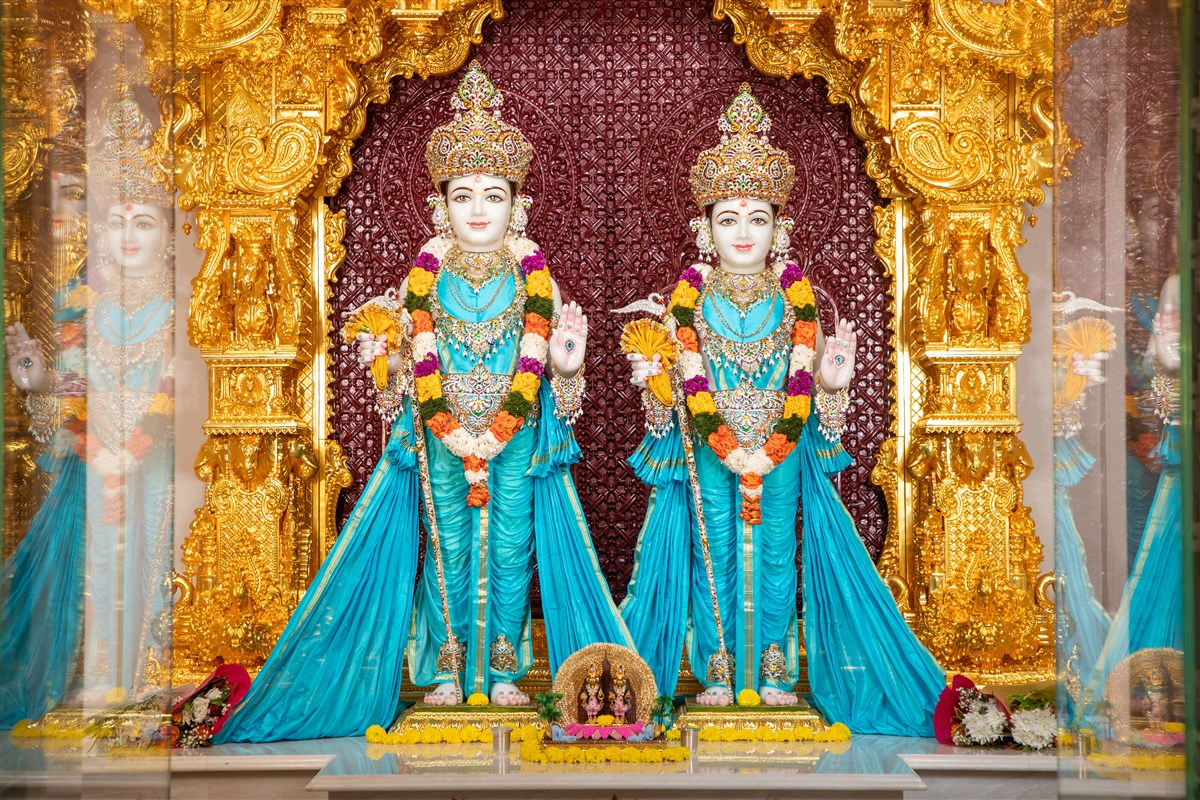
Swaminarayan and Gunatitanand Swami (collectively known as Akshar-Purushottam Maharaj)

The mandir's middle shrine houses the marble murtis (transl. sacred images) of Swaminarayan and Gunatitanand Swami, who are collectively worshiped as Akshar-Purushottam Maharaj. Swaminarayan is the founder of the Swaminarayan Sampradaya and is revered as Purushottam (God) and Gunatitanand Swami is the first spiritual successor of Swaminarayan and is revered as Akshar.

The second shrine houses the marble murtis of Krishna, an avatar of Vishnu, with his consort, Radha. Radha-Krishna are a central deity pair worshiped in Vaishnavism. The third shrine houses the marble murtis of Rama with his consort Sita, his brother Lakshmana, and Rama’s dedicated devotee Hanuman. Rama is worshiped as an avatar of Vishnu. The marble murtis of Shiva, a principal deity in Hindu traditions, with his consort Parvati, goddess of power and energy, and two sons, Ganesha and Kartikeya, are housed in the fourth shrine.

The fifth shrine houses the black granite murtis of Srinivasa, also known as Venkateshwara, an incarnation of Vishnu, and his consort Padmavati, who is an incarnation of Lakshmi, the goddess of wealth. These murtis were crafted by expert artisans from the Tirupati temple in Andhra Pradesh. The murtis of Jagannath, a form of Krishna, accompanied by his siblings Subhadra and Balabhadra are housed in the sixth shrine. These murtis were made under the supervision of the king of Jagannathpuri in Odisha.

The seventh shrine is dedicated to the deity Ayyappan. His murti is made from panchaloha (traditional five-metal alloy) and was designed by 15 artisans from Kerala. The murti sits on a pedestal and is four feet in height. The murti is also accompanied by a model of the 18 holy steps of the Sabarimala Ayyappa Temple in Kerala.

== History ==
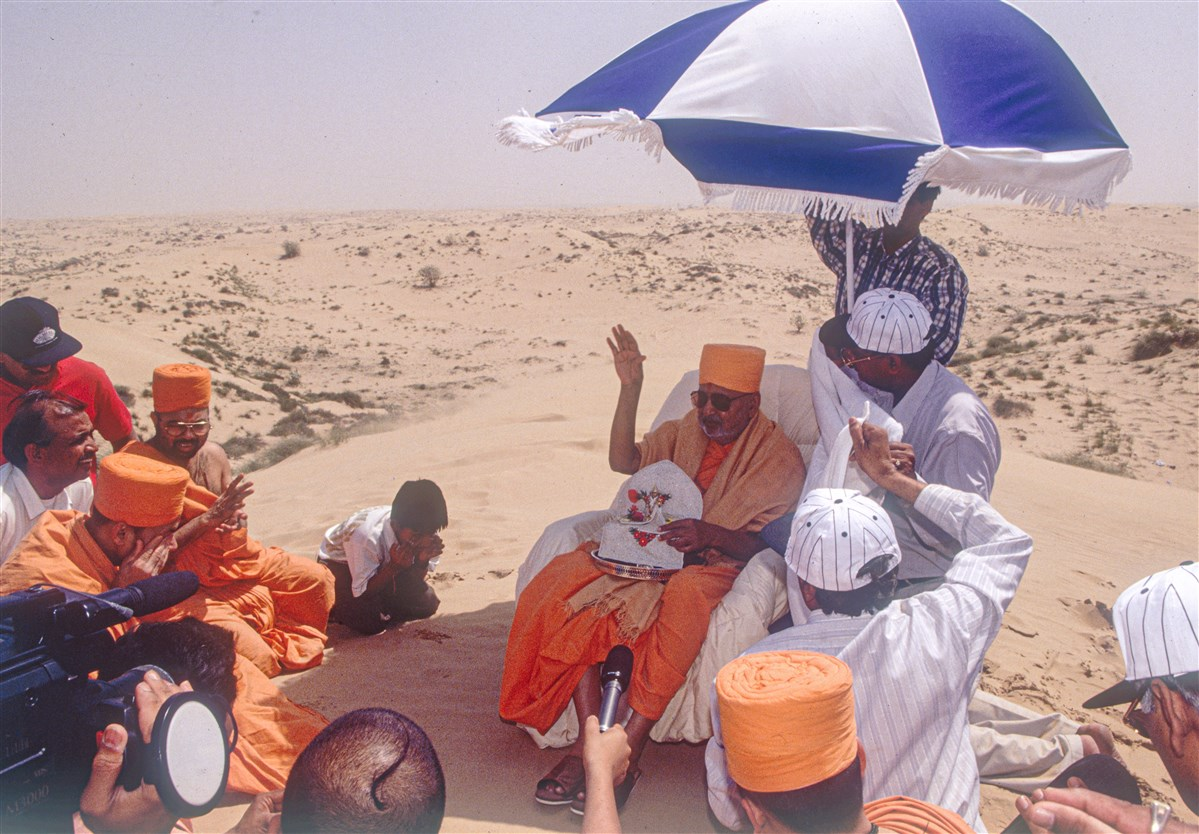
On 5 April 1997, in the desert of Sharjah, Pramukh Swami Maharaj prayed for peace amongst all religions, prosperity for all countries and for a mandir in Abu Dhabi.

Pramukh Swami Maharaj visited the Middle East in 1997 and envisioned a mandir in Abu Dhabi. On the evening of 5 April 1997, Pramukh Swami Maharaj visited a desert in Sharjah where he stated that a mandir in Abu Dhabi would bring "countries, cultures, and religions closer together."

In August 2015, the UAE government announced the decision to provide land for building a Hindu mandir in Abu Dhabi. Sheikh Mohammed bin Zayed Al Nahyan, the Crown Prince of Abu Dhabi and Deputy Supreme Commander of the UAE Armed Forces, gifted the land for the mandir. Indian Prime Minister Narendra Modi welcomed the development, stating, "I am confident that it will be a symbol of peace, piety, harmony, and inclusiveness that are inherent to the faith of Islam. I thank the UAE leadership for this landmark decision." Sheikh Mohammad Bin Zayed Al Nahyan gifted 13.5 acres for the temple and 13.5 acres for parking. Navdeep Suri, the former Indian ambassador to the UAE, noted that the BAPS mandir in Abu Dhabi was considered important by both Indian and UAE leaders, ranking among their top priorities.

On 10 February 2018, BAPS representatives met Sheikh Mohammed and the Indian Prime Minister Narendra Modi in the Presidential Palace. A memorandum of understanding was signed by India and the UAE in the presence of the entire royal family and over 250 local leaders. Prime Minister Modi expressed that the mandir "will be a holy place where humanity and harmony will unite". The first stone consecration (transl. shila pujan) for the mandir took place on 11 February 2018.

On 20 April 2019, in the presence of Mahant Swami Maharaj, the spiritual leader of BAPS, the foundation stone-laying ceremony (transl. shilanyas vidhi) was performed with guests and officials from India and the UAE. Expressing his thanks to the UAE government, Indian Ambassador Navdeep Suri said, "This will be the eternal bridge of friendship between our nations, our cultures and civilisations".

== Construction ==
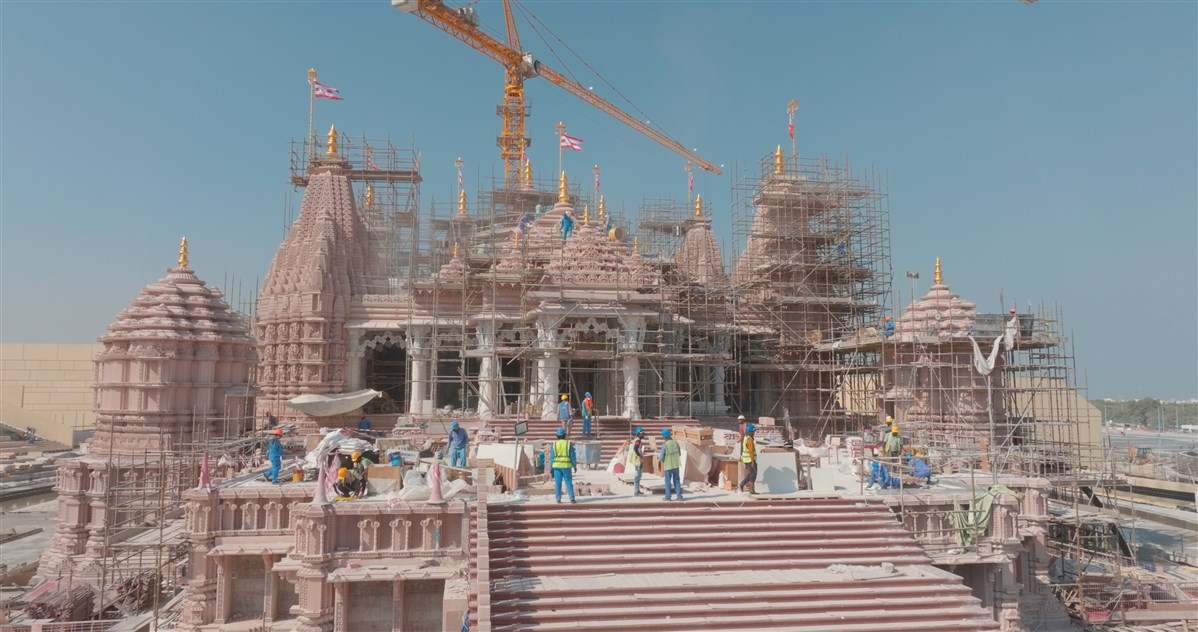
BAPS Hindu Mandir under construction

Construction of the mandir began in December 2019 on 27 acres of land. The site is located at Abu Mureikhah, which is near Al Rahba off the Dubai–Abu Dhabi Sheikh Zayed Highway.

Geotechnical surveys at the precise location on the land for the mandir revealed a substantial layer of sandstone lying just a meter beneath the surface. This sandstone provides a robust foundation for the temple, ensuring exceptional stability. Pink sandstone, a durable stone from the northern Indian state of Rajasthan, was selected for the mandir exterior due to its ability to withstand scorching summer temperatures of up to 50 °C (122 °F), such as those sometimes experienced in the UAE. Aqua Bianca, a special Italian marble was used to build the interior of the mandir. The 'white water' grade of the marble features a predominantly white or off-white background colour. More than 2,000 artisans worked on the intricate carvings in Rajasthan. To minimise the carbon footprint, fly ash was used in the foundation's concrete mix, reducing the amount of cement required by 55%.

=== Volunteer participation ===
Over 200 volunteers from the United Arab Emirates, Africa, the United Kingdom, the United States, India, and other Gulf countries dedicated more than 690,000 hours towards the construction of the mandir. Their participation extends across various domains, encompassing logistics, civil engineering work, construction, planning, and mandir maintenance, thereby playing a crucial role in shaping the project. Individuals of diverse backgrounds, including teenagers, businesspeople, designers, and retired expatriates contributed to the mandir's construction. These volunteers describe their service as part of their devotion and spirituality. Children also volunteered and created stone art as a symbol of harmony.

== Architecture ==
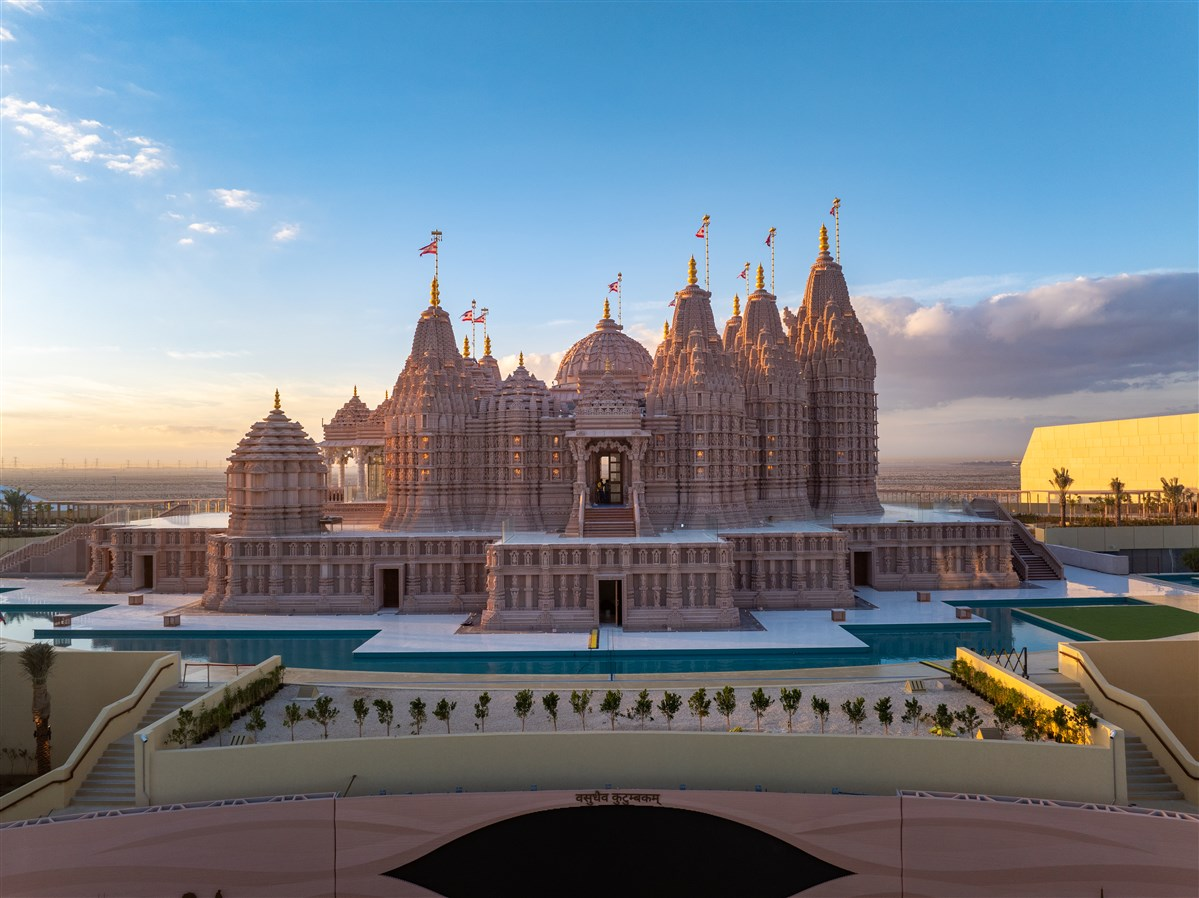
The side view of the mandir.

Built according to the shilpa shastras, the ancient Hindu treatises of mandir construction, the BAPS Hindu Mandir in Abu Dhabi is the largest Hindu temple in West Asia, and the first traditional Hindu stone mandir in the Middle East. The mandir stands at 108 feet in height, 262 feet in length, and 180 feet in width. Other architectural features include: two ghumats (domes), seven shikars (spires) symbolic of the seven Emirates in UAE, 12 samrans (pyramidal domes) and 402 pillars. It contains white marble carvings in its interior against a pink sandstone exterior backdrop. The mandir is made of more than 25,000 pieces of stone, weighing from under 1 kilogram to over 6 tonnes, each carved by skilled artisans in India. Within each of the shikars, there are carvings of stories from the Ramayana, Shiva Purana, Bhagavatam, Mahabharata, and carvings that portray the lives of Jagannath, Swaminarayan, Venkateshwara, and Ayyappa. The 'Dome of Harmony' showcases the five natural elements - earth, water, fire, air, and space. There are also carvings of animals like horses and camels that represent the UAE, each carved in a unique way.

In order to represent the art and architecture of India holistically, the design team studied mandirs of Jagannath, Konark, Ranakpur, Delwara, and other places of worship throughout India. To meet the policies established by the Gulf Cooperation Council (GCC), the mandir was built to be earthquake-resistant. This is the first Hindu traditional mandir to undergo complete digital modeling and seismic simulation.

== Mandir components ==
The mandir incorporates all aspects and features of a traditional Hindu mandir as part of a fully functional, social, cultural, and spiritual complex. The complex includes a visitor centre, prayer halls, exhibitions, learning areas, a sports area for children, thematic gardens, water features, a food court, a gift shop. The mandir has 100 sensors in the foundation and over 350 sensors throughout the mandir to provide data on earthquake activity, temperature variations, and pressure changes.

The Wall of Harmony, which welcomes one to the mandir, is a 47-metre-long 3D-printed wall completed by the Dawoodi Bohra Muslim community.

The mandir design also incorporates environmental-friendly features such as wooden pallets being recycled to make benches, tables, and chairs for the food court. There is a waterfall feature on the mandir campus that symbolises the source of three rivers holy to Hinduism - the Ganga, Yamuna, and Saraswati.

The immersive experienced, titled 'The Fairy Tale', utilises advanced surround sound, 20 projectors, coupled with storytelling. The experience was crafted by BAPS volunteers, swamis, and audio-visual consultants. The show highlights key moments in the history of the mandir - Pramukh Swami Maharaj's prayer in the Sharjah desert, Sheikh Mohamed bin Zayed Al Nahyan's generosity, and the inauguration by Mahant Swami Maharaj with chief guest India Prime Minister Narendra Modi.

== Visitors and access ==
Within the first year of opening to the public, the mandir reported over 2.2 million visitors. To manage the influx of visitors, especially during holidays and festivals, the mandir implemented a pre-registration process in which visitors book a date and time slot for their planned visit.

== Interfaith and cultural harmony ==
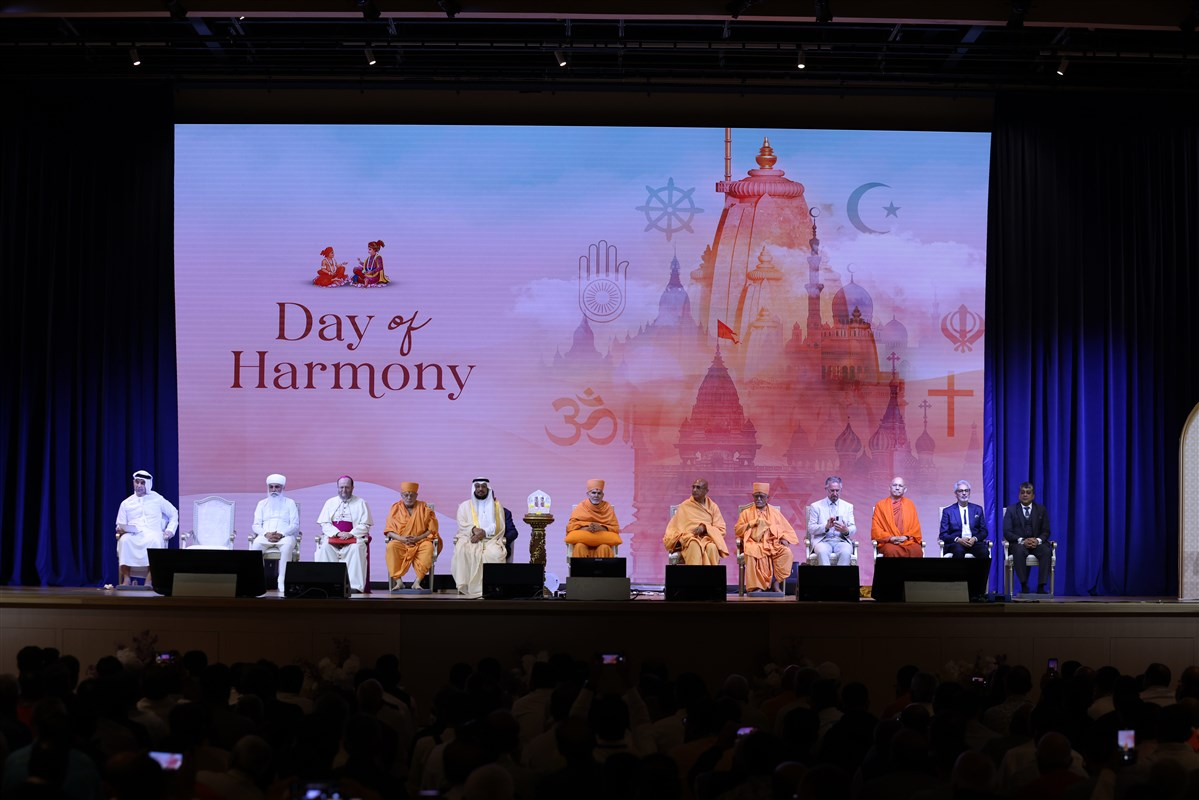
On 15 February 2024, Mahant Swami Maharaj and world religious leaders convened during the evening assembly.

The land to build this Hindu mandir was donated by a Muslim crown prince, while the lead architect for the project was a Catholic Christian, and the construction project was managed by a Sikh who worked for a Parsi-owned company, Shapoorji Pallonji. The foundation designer was a Buddhist, and a director of the mandir is a Jain. Interfaith and cultural harmony was significantly found throughout the mandir project.

As part of the UAE's initiative to promote cultural diversity, tolerance, and peace, the government organised a ceremony in September 2019 and officially awarded legal status in the UAE to the BAPS Hindu Mandir and 17 other houses of worship.

During the foundation stone laying ceremony in April 2019, Mugheer Khamis Al Khaili, Chairman of the Department of Community Development, said, "Laying the foundation stone of the mandir is reflective of the landscape of tolerance and pluralism in the UAE. The Founding Father, late Sheikh Zayed, always believed that co-existence between peoples of various religious beliefs and nationalities is the only way to establish international peace". The mandir has carvings of animals native to the UAE, like camels, oryxes, and falcons. There are also 14 depictions of parables from Arabian, Egyptian, Mesopotamian, and other civilisations. Observing the carvings, Sheikh Nahayan bin Mabarak Al Nahyan, the Minister of Tolerance and Co-existence of UAE, stated, "The craftsmanship is intricate and amazing, and the place will help spread global harmony."

=== Events and official visits ===
In the spirit of interfaith and cultural harmony, the mandir has hosted numerous cultural, diplomatic, and interfaith events.

In May 2023, during a visit by ambassadors from 30 countries Japanese Ambassador, Akio Isomata, said, "I see a philosophy of tolerance in the carvings." In January 2024, diplomats from 42 countries visited the mandir. Deputy Ambassador of the UK Jonathan Knight stated, "It's wonderful to see a place that's been contributed to by so many different faiths coming together to build something that will last for generations."

In April 2024, an interfaith cultural gathering named 'Omsiyyat' was organised, in which over 200 leaders and community members representing various religions participated during Ramadan. UAE Minister of Tolerance and Co-existence Sheikh Nahyan bin Mukbarak Al Nahayan attended the event and highlighted the importance of unity and mutual respect across different faiths. In a similar event in 2025, Minister of Tolerance and Co-existence Sheikh Nahyan bin Mukbarak Al Nahyan, Rabbi Jeff Berger of the Abrahamic Family House, Rabbi Levi Duchmann, Father Lalji of the Church of South India Parish, and Baháʼí community leaders and over 200 other leaders, ambassadors, and diplomats also attended.

In November 2024, the Indian Global Forum (IGF) Leaders Dinner was hosted at the mandir, bringing leaders from India and the Middle East together. Along with the delegation, the Ambassador of India to the UAE, Sunjay Suddhir, and Brahmavihari Swami also attended the event. The evening's discussions strengthened relationships, showcasing the region's unity and progress.

In January 2025, the mandir hosted defence attachés, their families, and dignitaries from 20 nations worldwide for a cultural exchange and open dialogue on peace, diversity, and harmony.

Visiting for Diwali 2025, former Undersecretary-General of the United Nations and Indian leader Shashi Tharoor stated, "Going beyond its extraordinary spiritual content, every inch of this mandir reflects harmony and unity. I spent years at the UN talking about our common humanity. Today, I have seen the embodiment of that humanity in stone, in spirit, and in purpose."

== Inauguration ==
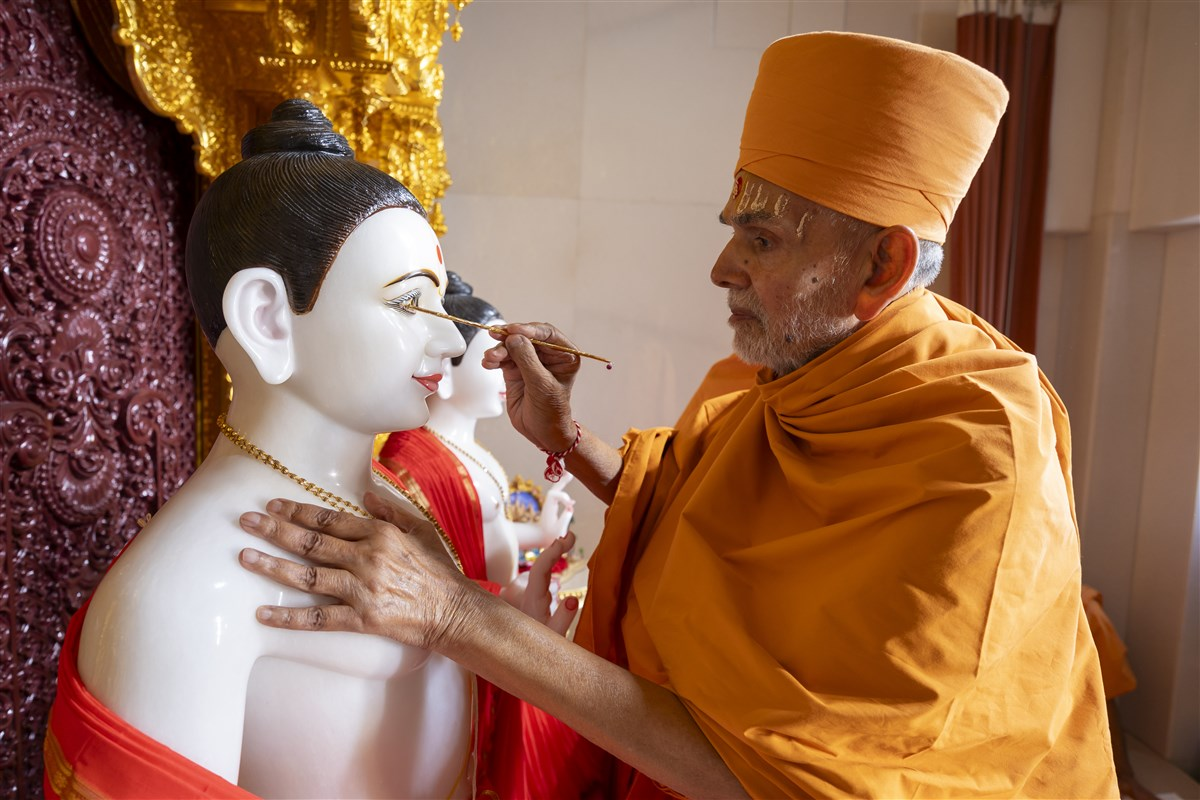
Mahant Swami Maharaj performing the pran-pratishtha rituals.

The 12-day celebration for the inauguration of the mandir, called the "Festival of Harmony," commenced on 10 February 2024. A Vedic ritual seeking divine blessings, named the "Yagna for Harmony," took place on 11 February 2024. It was the first such global harmony ritual in the region. On the morning of 14 February 2024, the mandir was consecrated through a Vedic ceremony (prana pratishtha) led by BAPS spiritual leader Mahant Swami Maharaj. On the afternoon of 14 February 2024, Prime Minister of India Narendra Modi joined Mahant Swami Maharaj in dedicating the mandir to the public. Indian Prime Minister Narendra Modi, UAE Minister of Tolerance and Coexistence Sheikh Nahyan bin Mubarak Al Nahyan, and the spiritual leader of the BAPS Swaminarayan Sanstha Mahant Swami Maharaj addressed the inaugural assembly. Narendra Modi said, "This temple will become a symbol of communal harmony and global unity for the entire world." Sheikh Al Nahyan said, "The UAE is a tolerant country, where people from different places, religious and ethnic backgrounds live in peace, harmony, and cooperation. You now have a new temple that will serve as a place of worship and a community centre for all." Mahant Swami Maharaj stated, "Throughout the ceremony, I have been praying for the people of this country and the world. May there be peace and prosperity for everyone and may we all progress together to serve the whole of humanity."

In the days following the inauguration, a series of events were held focusing on harmony, civilization, peace, gratitude, values, and inspiration. On 15 February 2024, an assembly called the "Day of Harmony" brought Hindu, Muslim, Christian, Jewish, Sikh, Buddhist, and other religious leaders together to commemorate the opening of the mandir and foster interfaith harmony. The Festival of Harmony came to an end on 21 February with a program organised by women called "Day of Inspiration." The program spotlighted women’s contributions to society and humanity. More than 2,000 women attended the assembly.

The mandir opened to the public on Friday, 1 March 2024, and on Sunday, 3 March 2024, more than 65,000 people visited the mandir. To accommodate the pilgrims and visitors, the UAE incorporated a new bus service on the weekends from Abu Dhabi city centre to the mandir in Abu Mureikha. On 10 April 2024, the BAPS Hindu Mandir announced a pre-registration booking system designed to accommodate the influx of visitors.

== Awards ==
The mandir was awarded the MEED Project Award's 'Best Cultural Project Across MENA 2024' and 'Best Cultural Project in the UAE' for its architecture, cultural importance, and positive impact to society. The MEED Project Awards, which hold high prestige in the Middle East and North Africa region, celebrate the best in engineering, innovation, and sustainability.

The mandir received the MONDO-DR 2025 Award, known as the 'Oscars of the AV World', in the House of Worship category for its innovative immersive show, 'The Fairy Tale.'

== Gallery ==
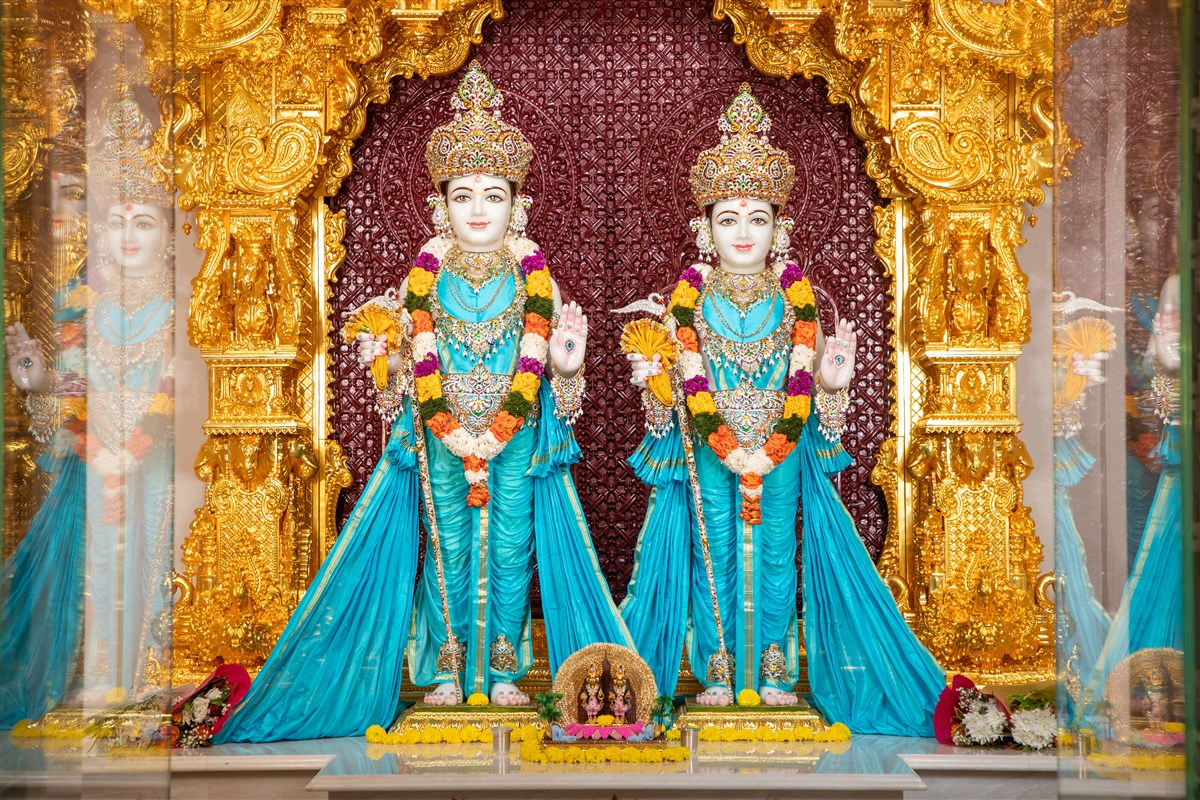
Swaminarayan and Gunatitanand Swami

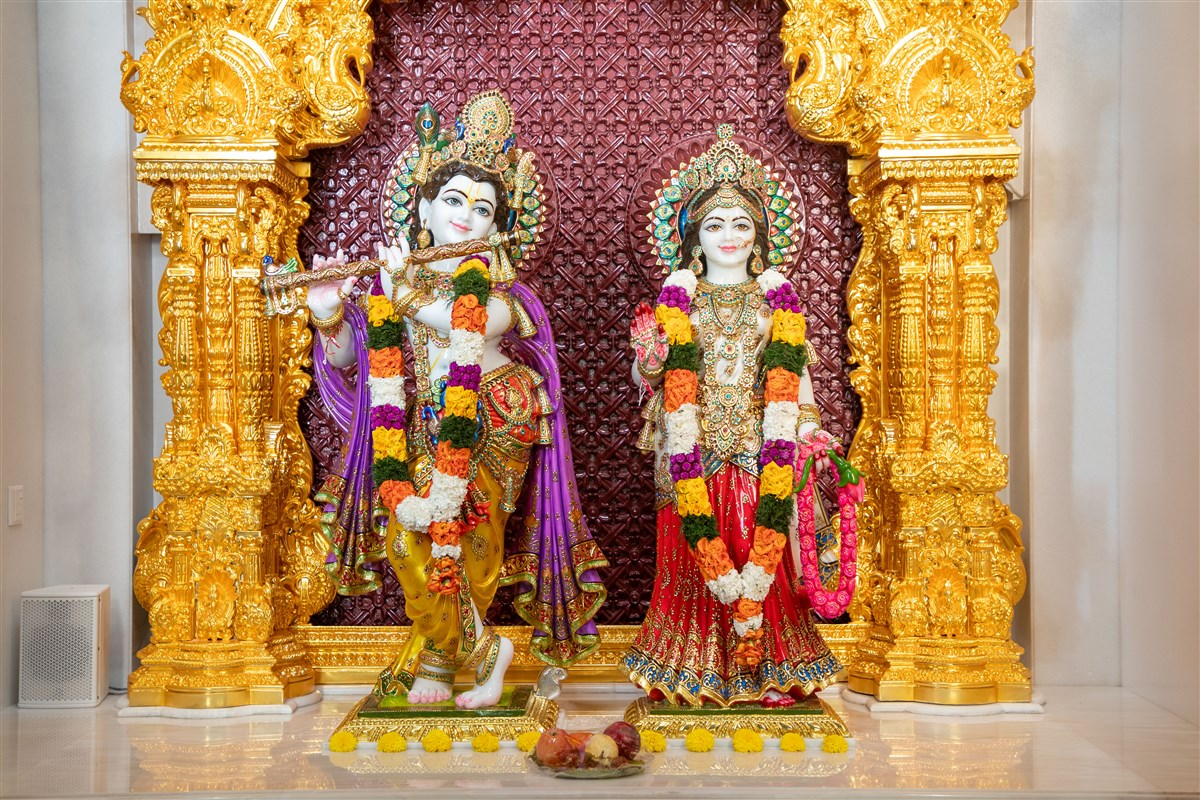
Krishna and Radha

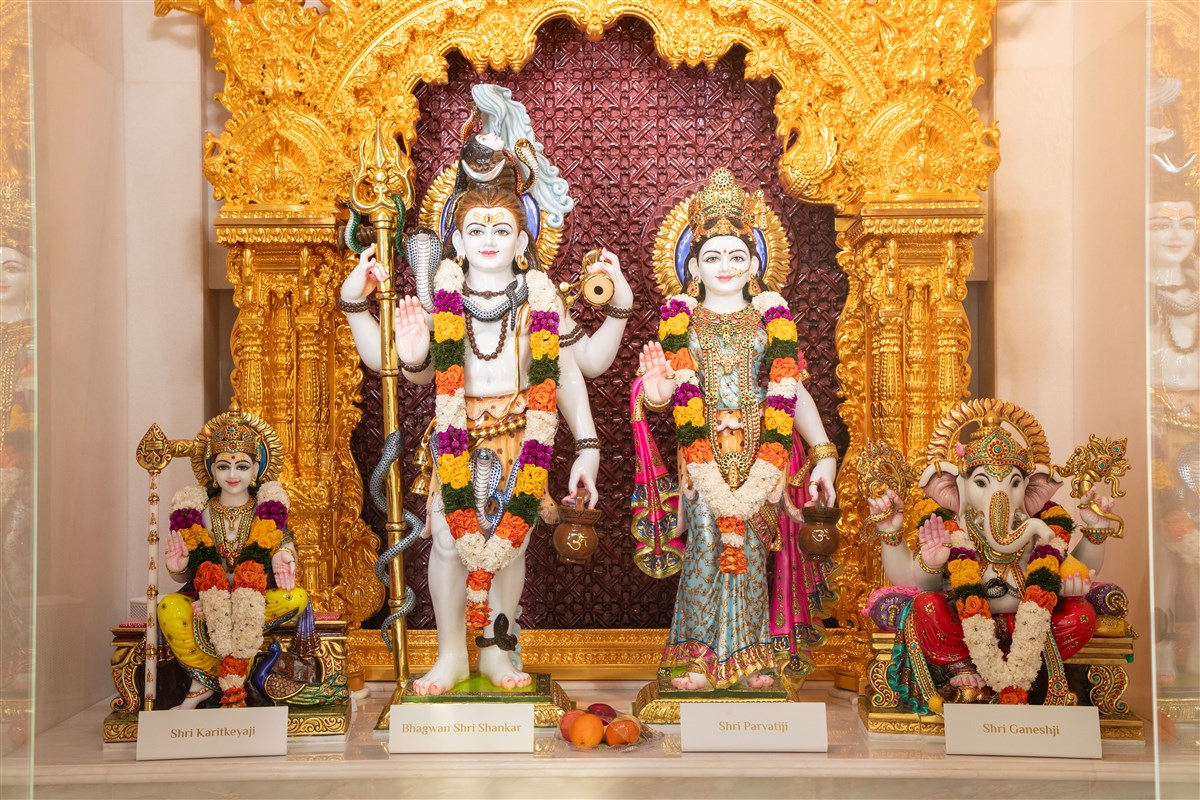
Shiva, Parvati, Kartikeya, and Ganesha

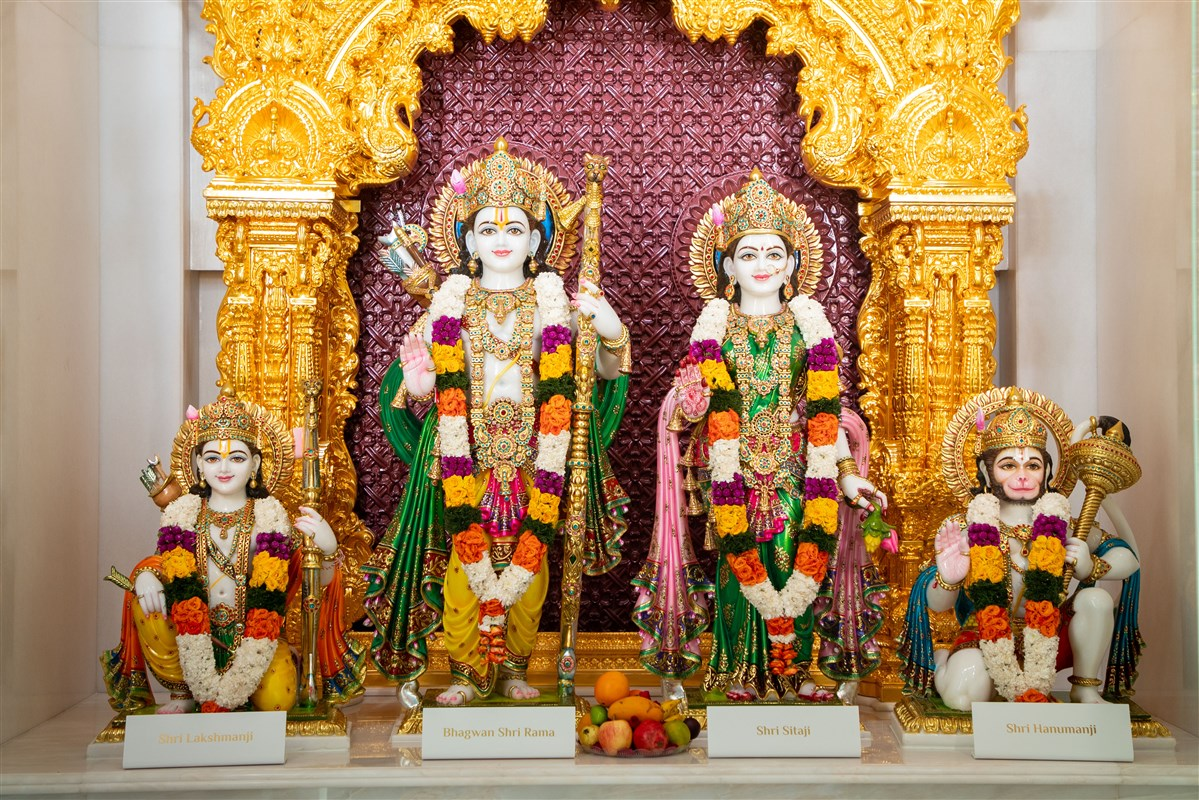
Rama, Sita, Lakshmana, and Hanuman

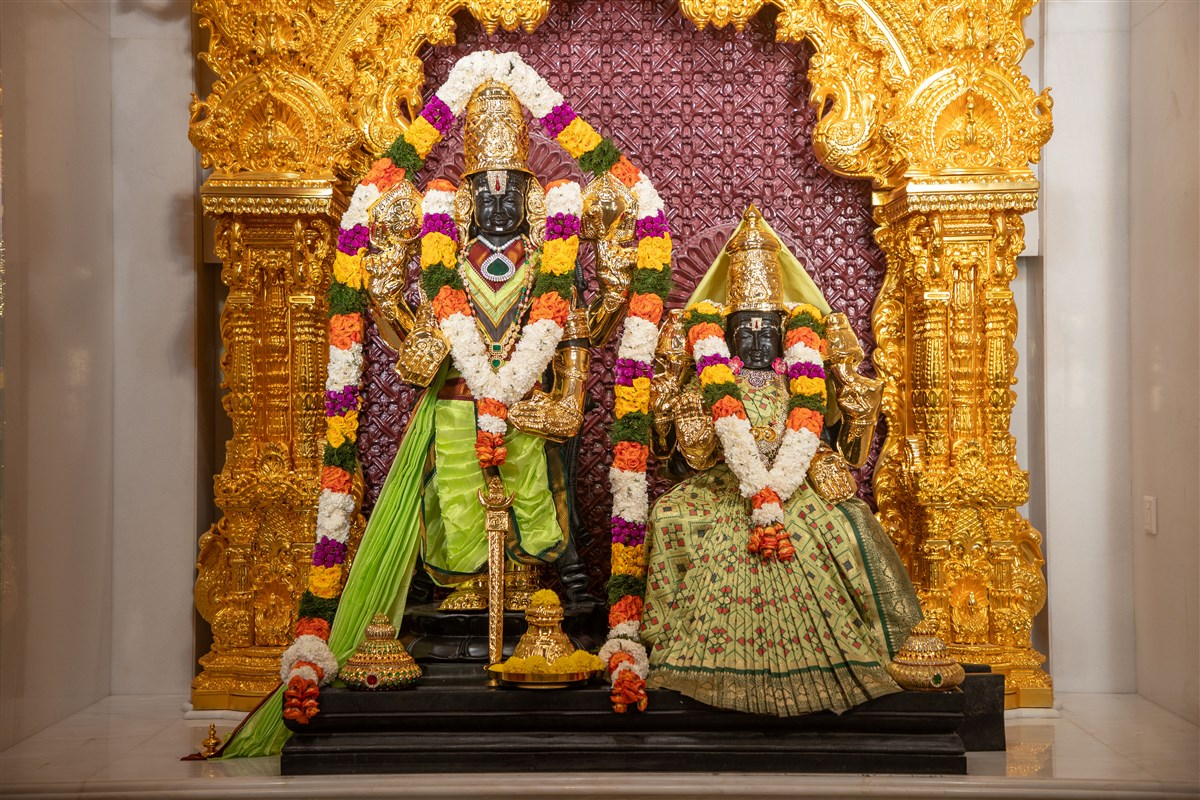
Venkateshwar and Padmavati

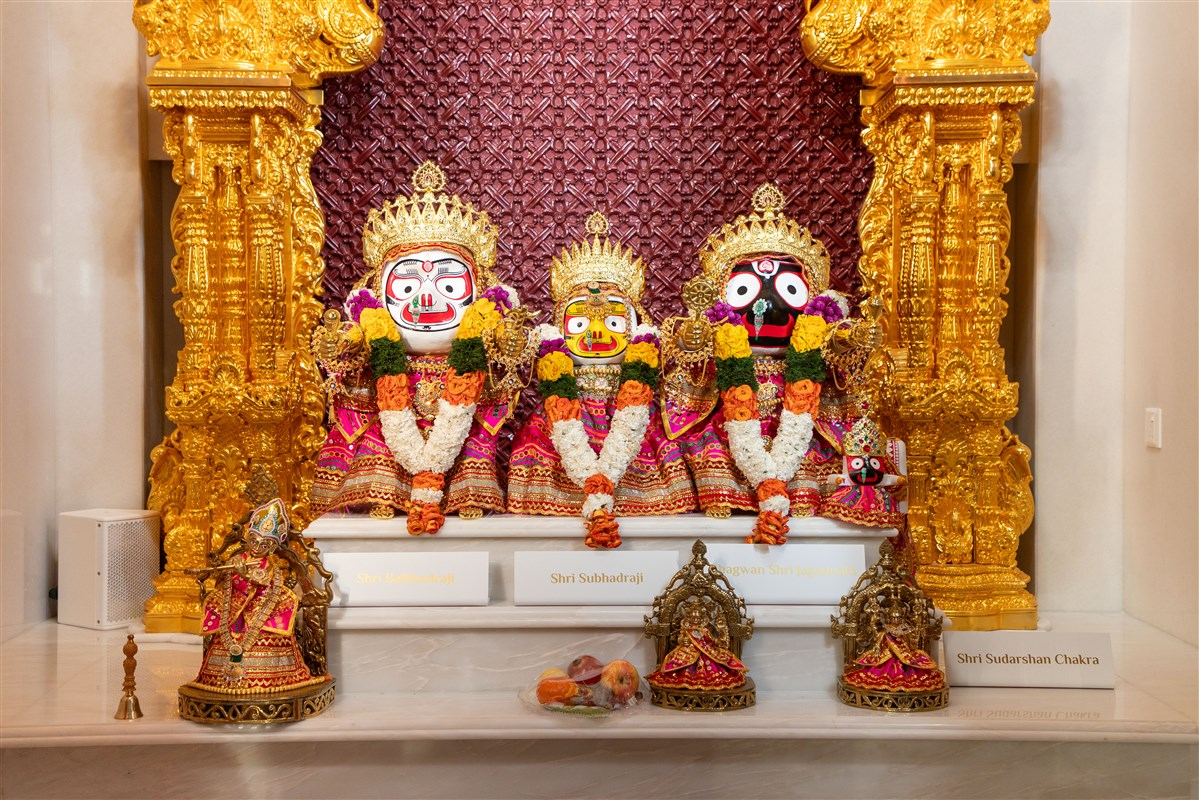
Jagannath, Balbhadra, and Subhadra

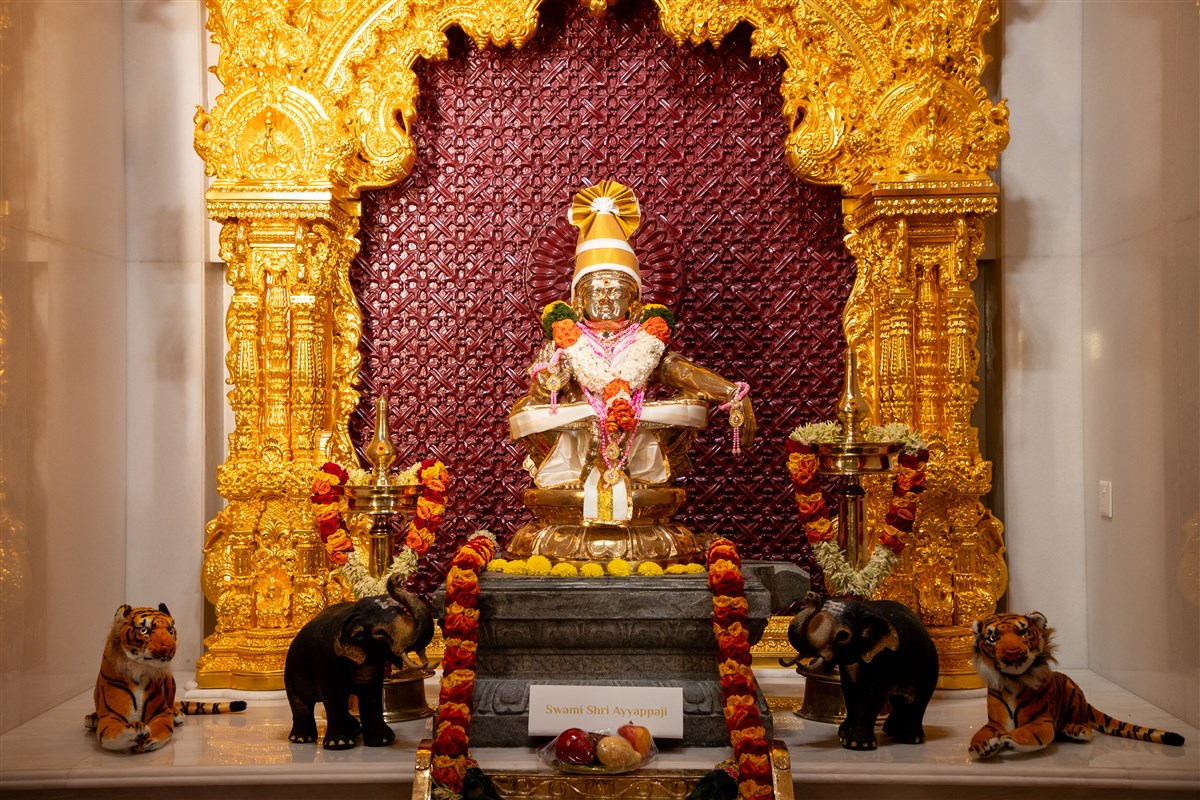
Ayyappa

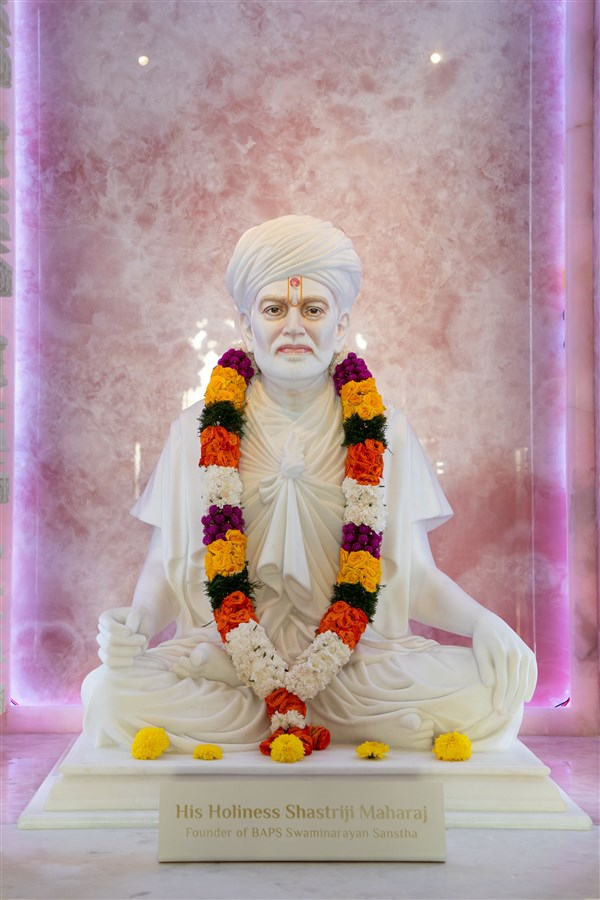
Shastriji Maharaj, founder of BAPS

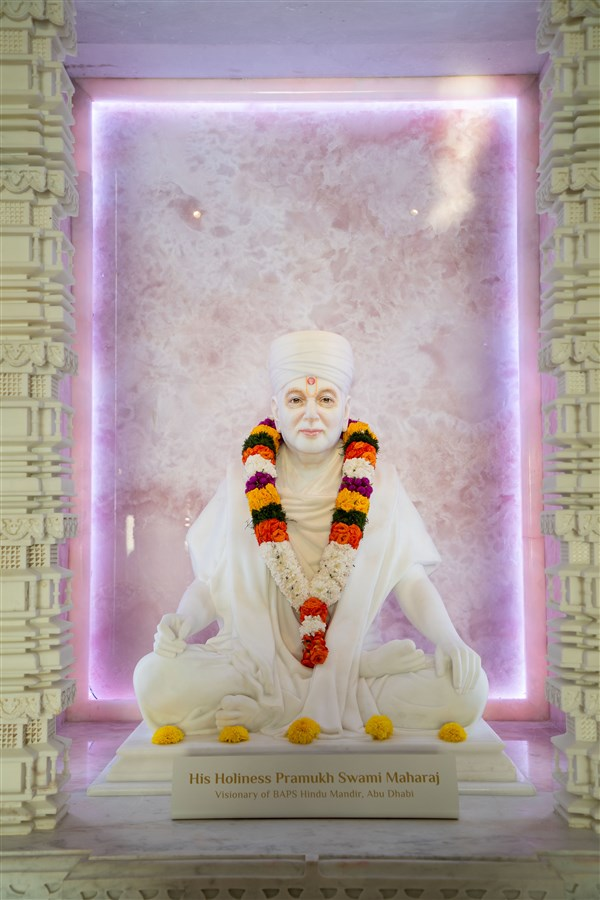
Pramukh Swami Maharaj, visionary of mandir

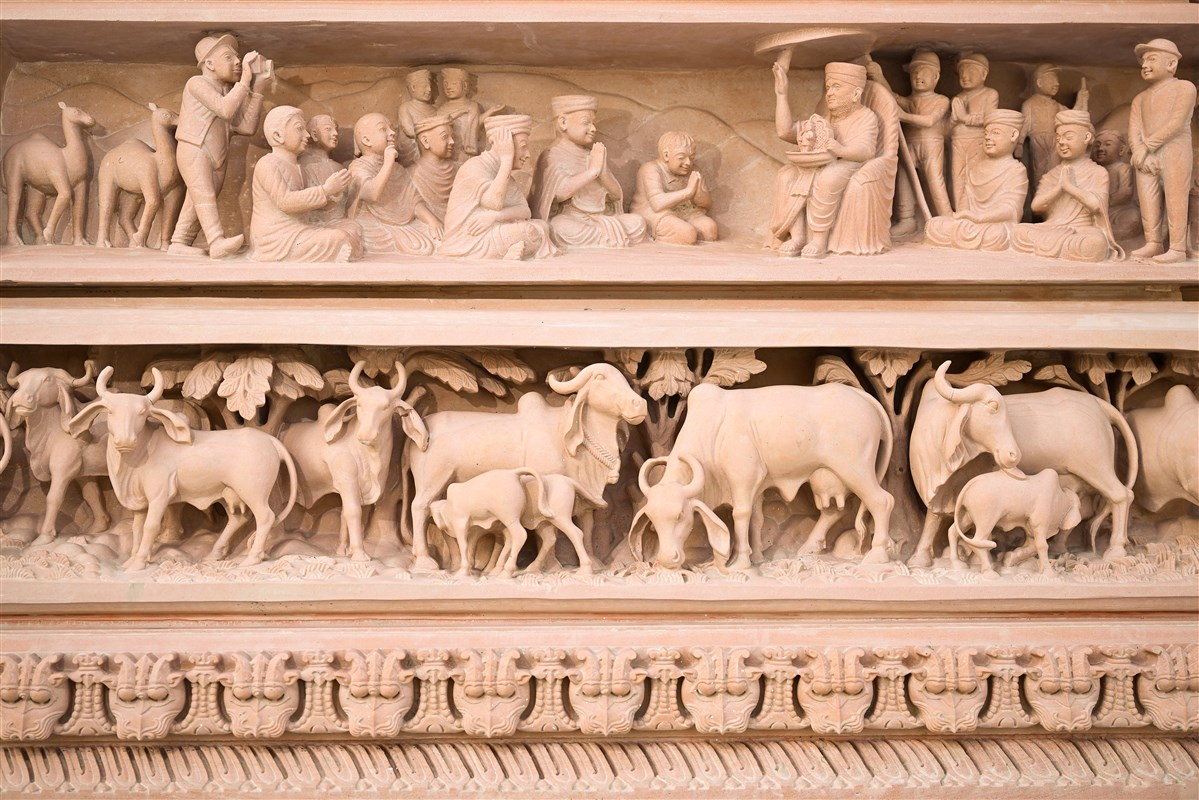
Sculpture depicting the moment Pramukh Swami Maharaj prayed for a mandir in Abu Dhabi in 1997

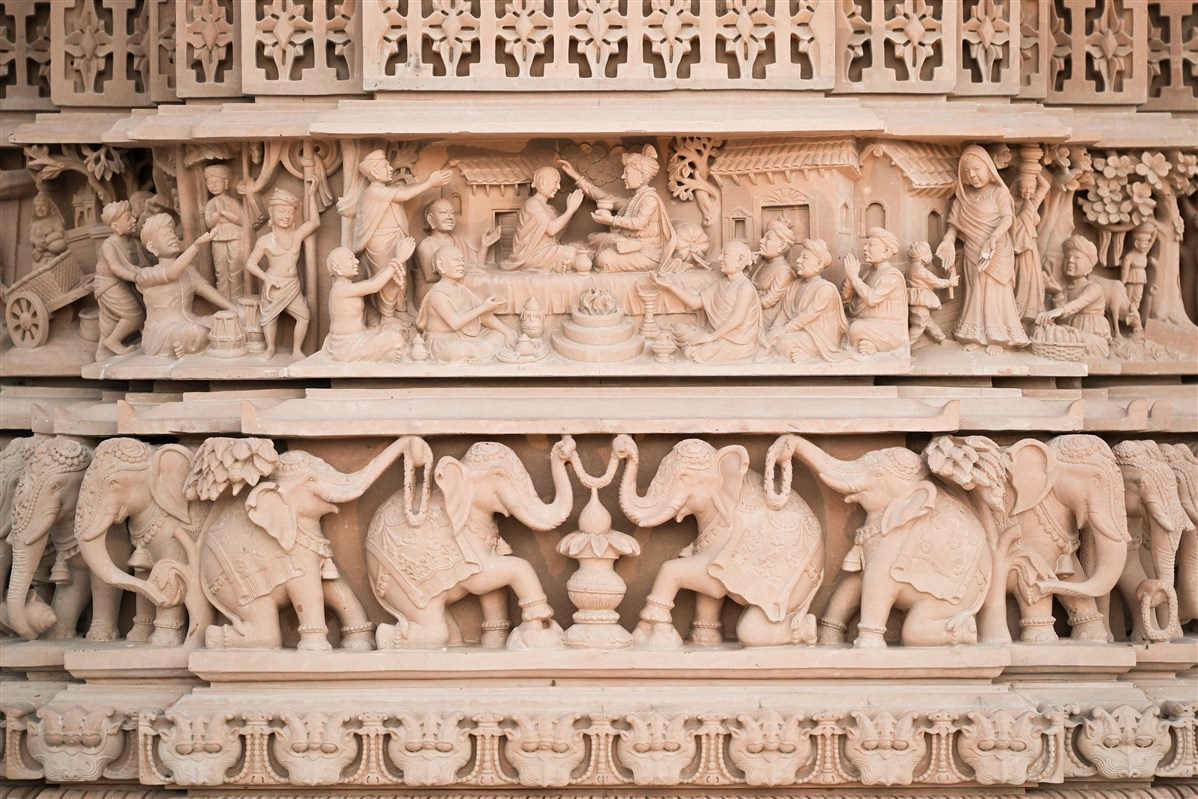
Exterior carving showing Swaminarayan ordaining Gunatitanand Swami, his first spiritual successor

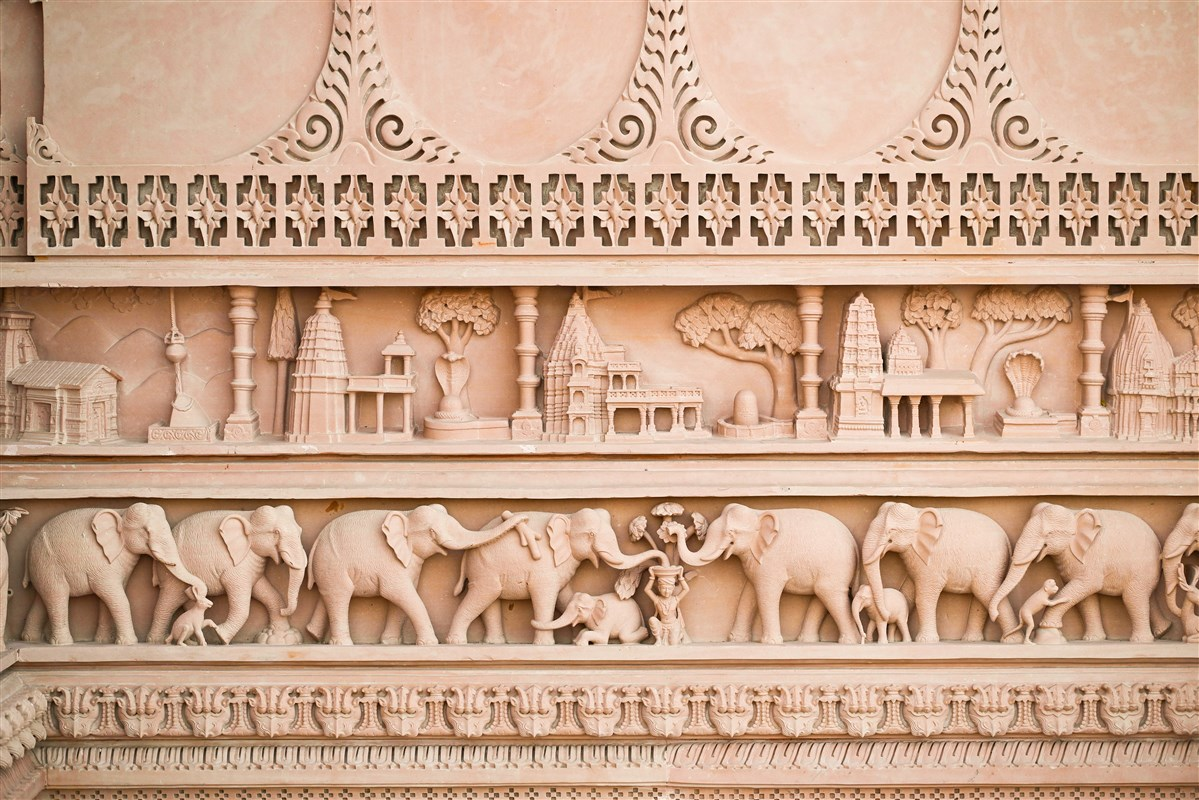
Twelve Jyotirlingas are sculpted on mandir exterior

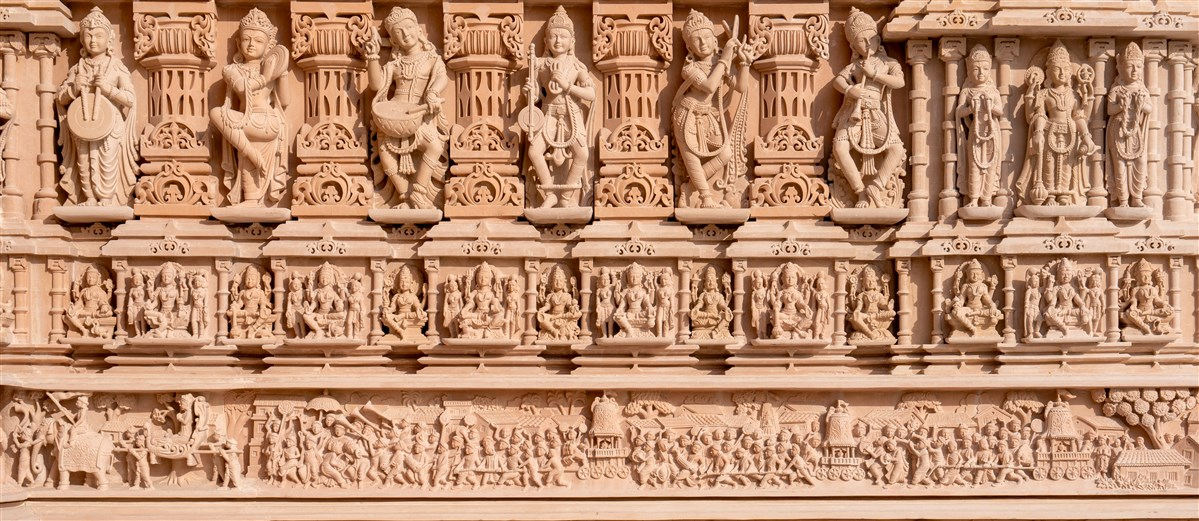
Exterior wall carvings depicting the Ratha Yatra festival of Jagannath in Odisha

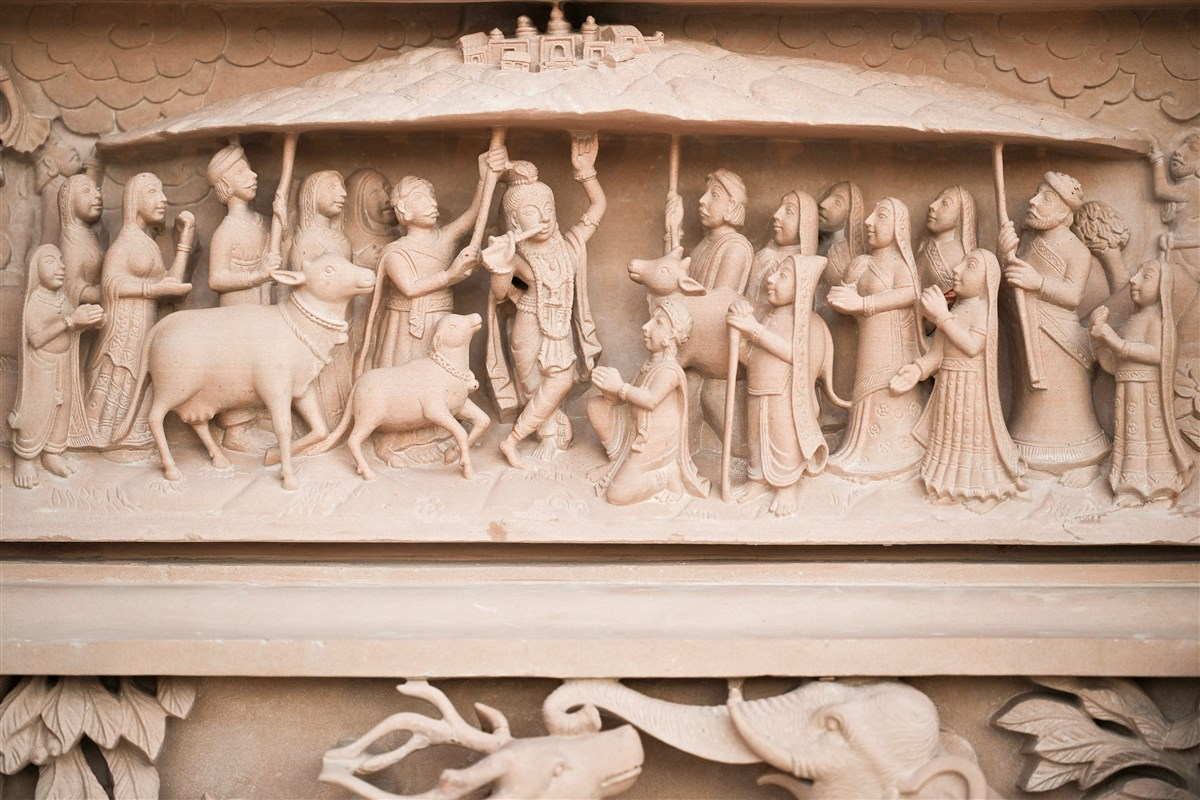
Exterior carving depicting Krishna lifting Mount Govardhan as narrated in Bhagavata Purana

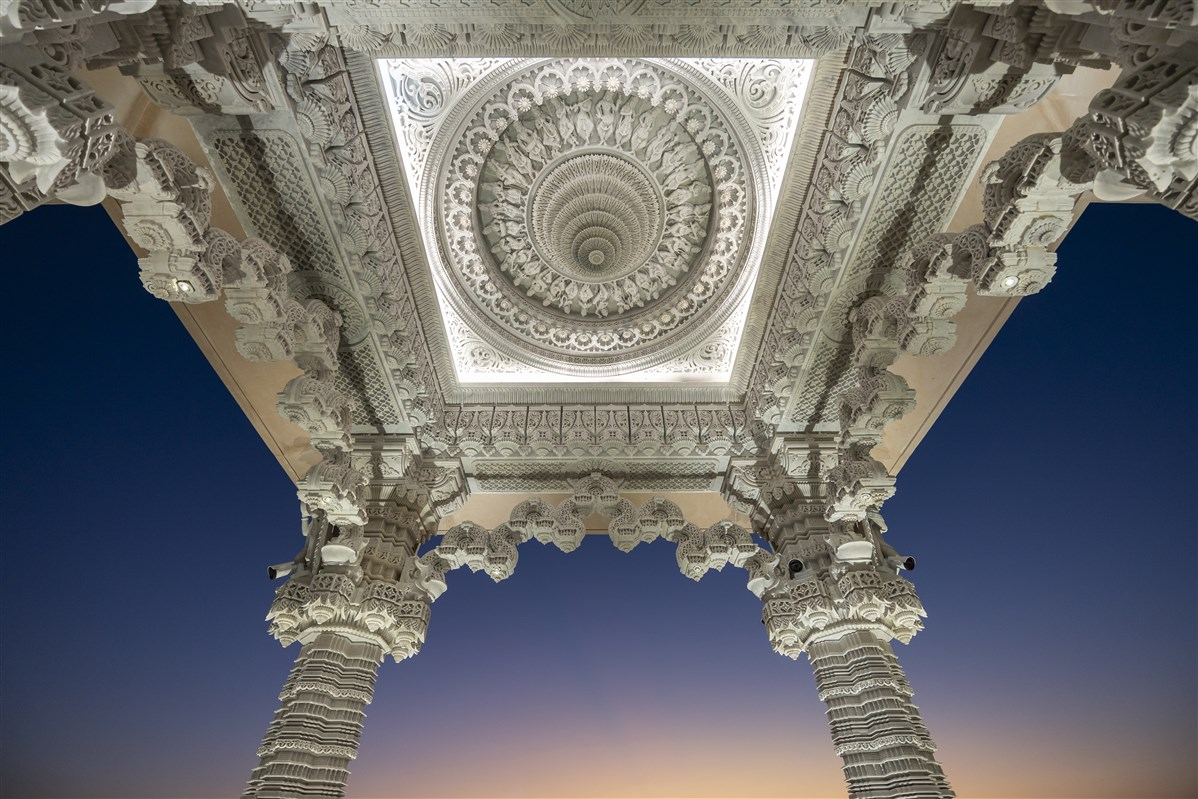
Interior carvings of the mandir

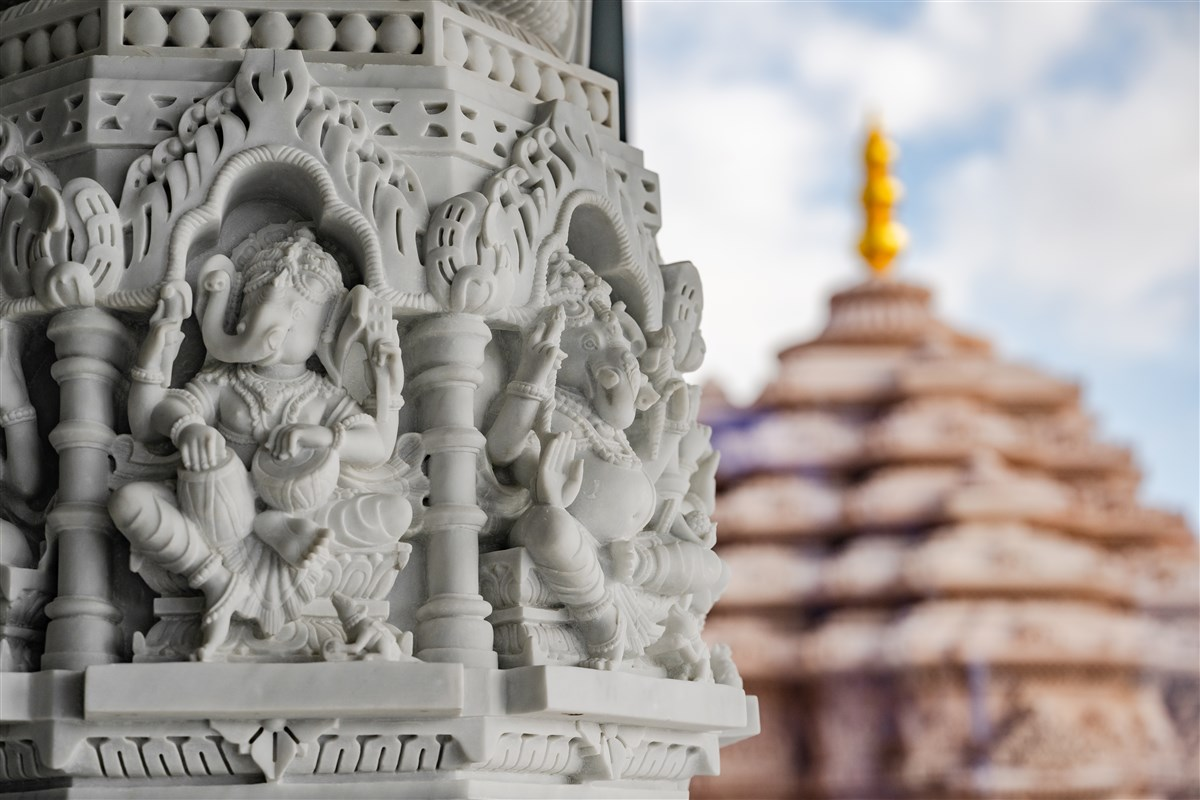
Ganesha sculpture on the mandir pillars

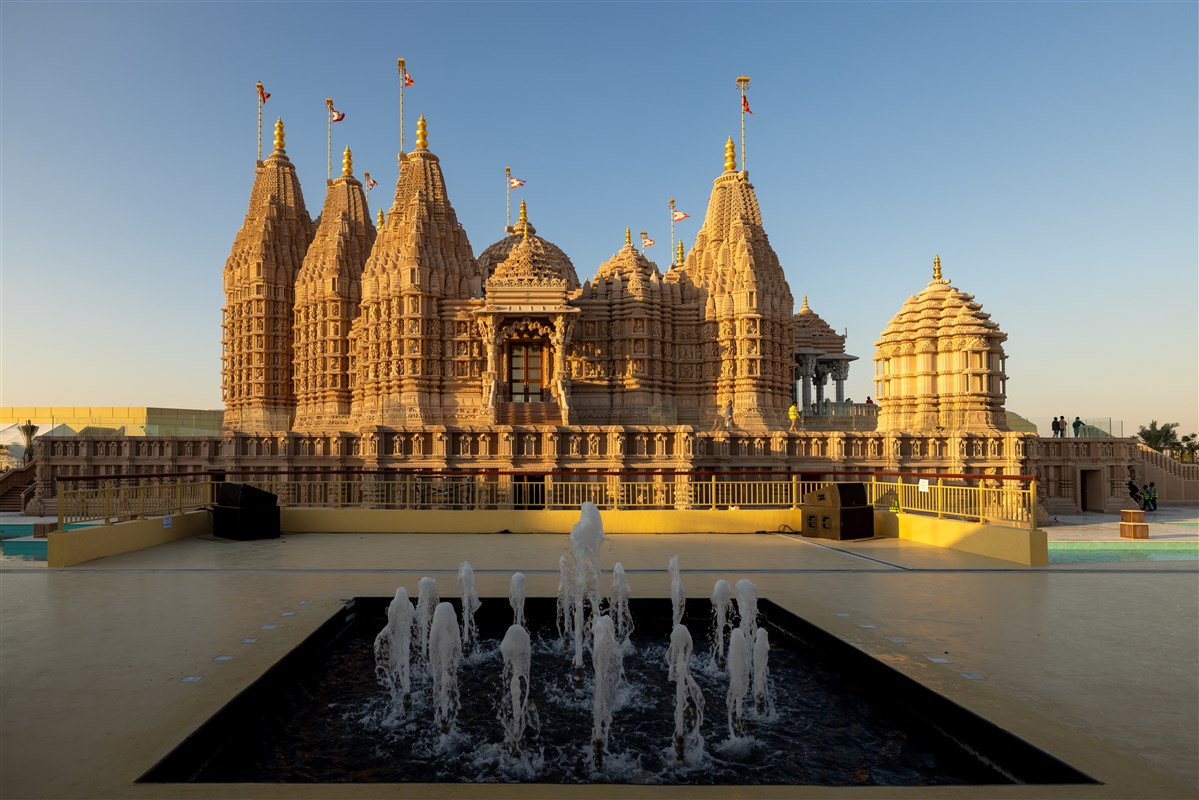
The side view of the mandir

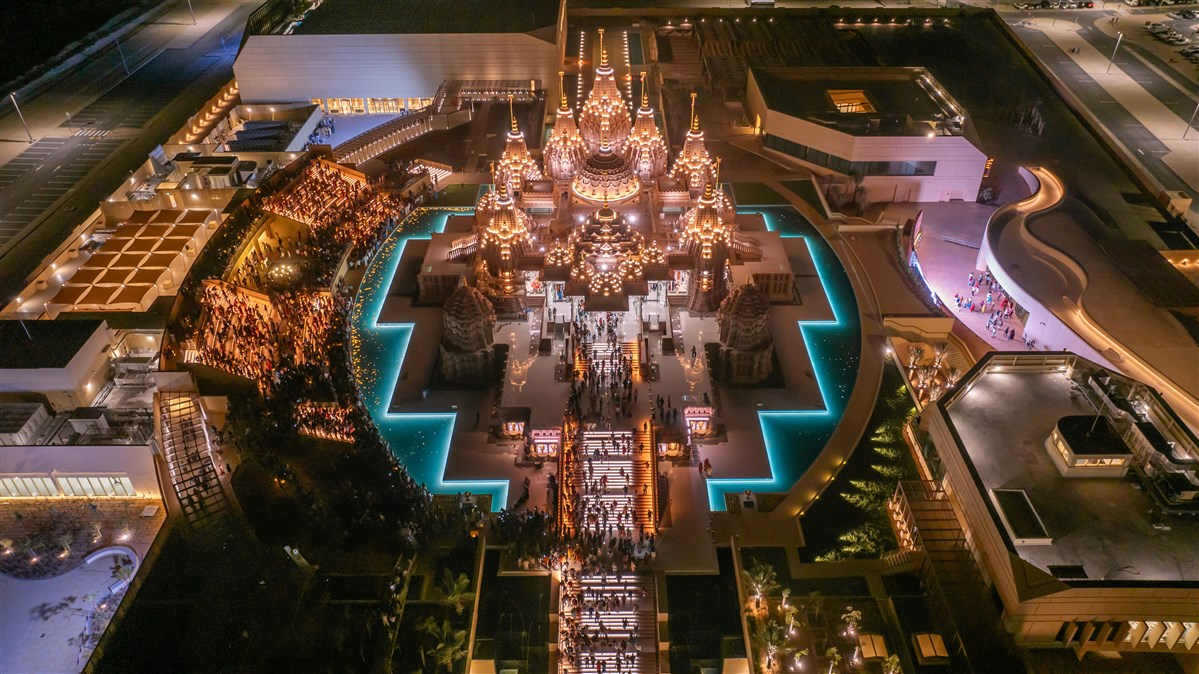
Aerial view of the campus.

== See also ==
- Bochasanwasi Akshar Purushottam Swaminarayan Sanstha
- India–United Arab Emirates relations
- Hinduism in Arab states
- Hindu Temple, Dubai
