= Sudhir Vyas =

Indian civil servant

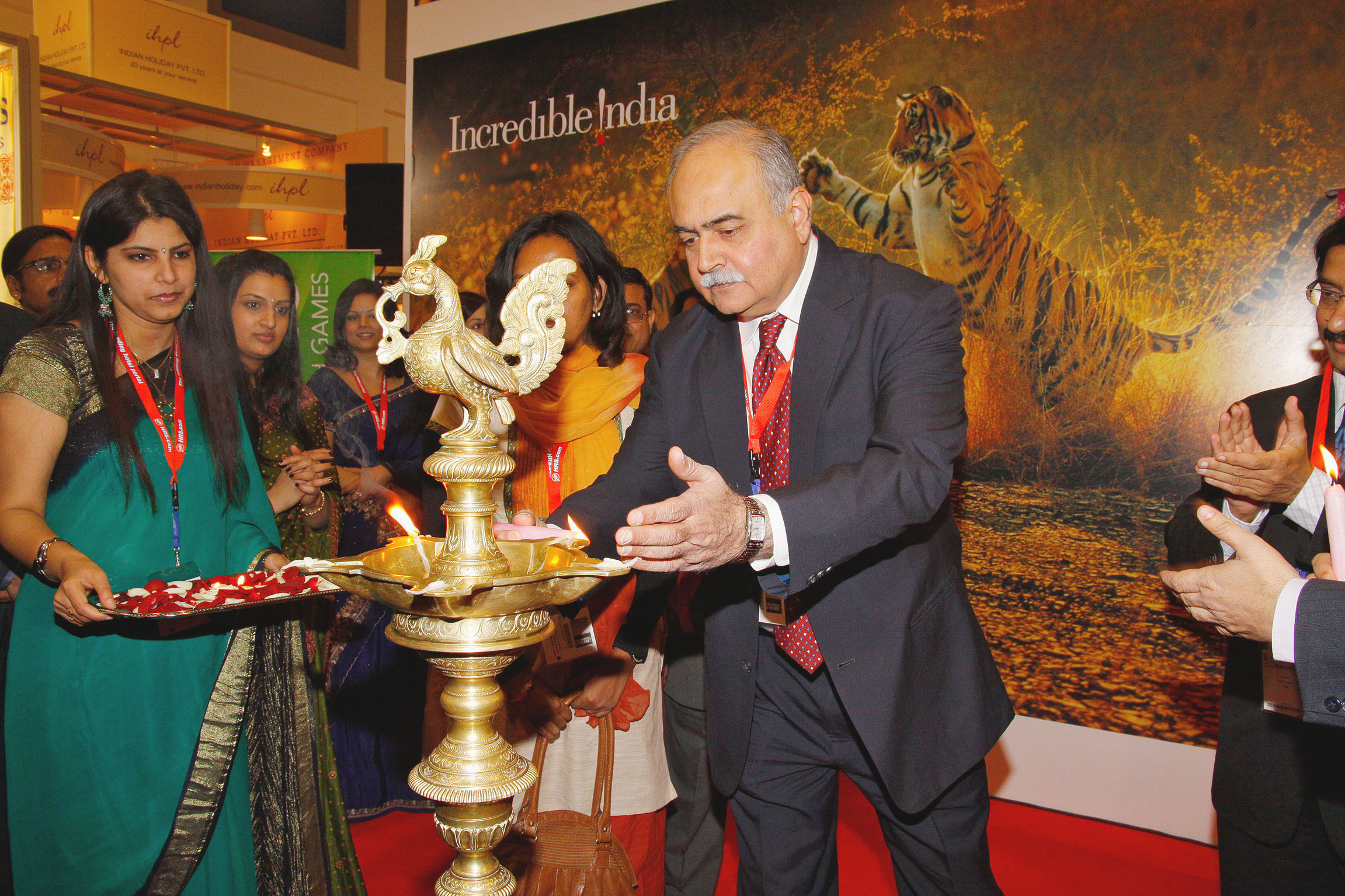
- Sudhir Vyas lighting the lamp to inaugurate the India Tourism Pavilion, at ITB, Berlin on March 10, 2010

Ambassador of India to Germany
- In office 2009–2011
- Preceded by: Meera Shankar
- Succeeded by: Sujatha Singh

Ambassador of India to Bhutan
- In office July 2005 – April 2009
- Succeeded by: Pavan Varma

Ambassador of India to the United Arab Emirates
- In office 24 August 2003 – 12 June 2005
- Preceded by: Krishan Chander Singh
- Succeeded by: C.M. Bhandari

Personal details
- Education: Indian Institute of Technology Kanpur
- Occupation: Civil servant IFS

Sudhir Vyas is an Indian Civil servant and was the Indian ambassador to Germany. Vyas was previously ambassador to Bhutan and the United Arab Emirates. In 2013 Vyas was appointed Secretary (West) in the Ministry of External Affairs (India). A 1977 batch officer of the Indian Foreign Service Vyas retired from the Indian Foreign Service in 2015 and was appointed to the Board of Governors to The Center for Escalation of Peace.

== Early life ==
Vyas graduated from Indian Institute of Technology Kanpur in 1975. In 1977, he joined the Indian Foreign Service.
