= C. M. Bhandari =

Indian diplomat

Indian ambassador to United Arab Emirates
- In office 25/06/2005–01/07/2007
- Preceded by: Sudhir Vyas
- Succeeded by: Talmiz Ahmad

Personal details
- Occupation: Civil servant IFS

C.M. Bhandari is an Indian Civil servant and was the Indian ambassador to United Arab Emirates.

== Positions held ==
- Ambassador to Poland.
- Ambassador to Lithuania.

== Indian Foreign Service ==
He is a 1974 batch officer of the Indian Foreign Service.
