= Krishan Chander Singh =

Indian civil servant and diplomat

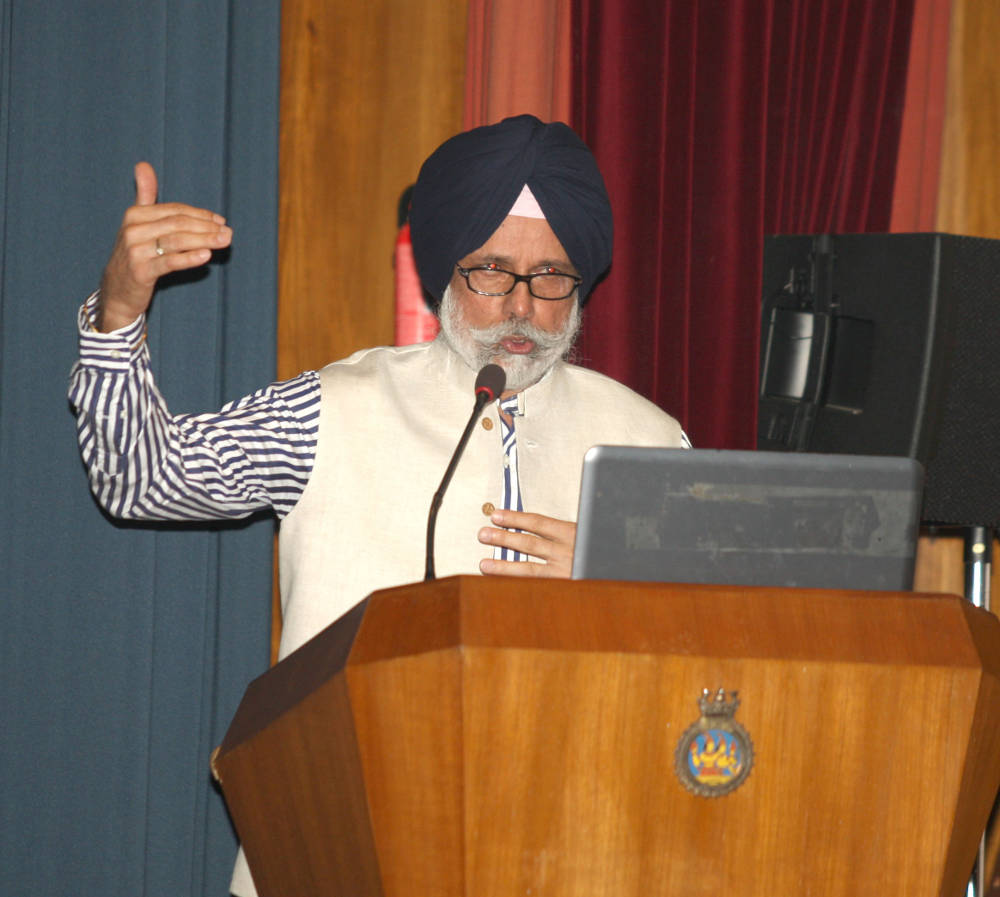

Indian ambassador to Iran
- In office 2003–2005

Indian ambassador to United Arab Emirates
- In office 18/03/1999–23/08/2003
- Preceded by: M.P.M. Menon
- Succeeded by: Sudhir Vyas

Personal details
- Education: Panjab University
- Occupation: Diplomat, Ambassador IFS

K.C. Singh is an Indian civil servant and was the Indian ambassador to Iran and UAE.

== Career ==
He is a 1974 batch officer of the Indian Foreign Service.
