= Sunjay Sudhir =

Indian diplomat

Sunjay Sudhir IFS (Retd.)
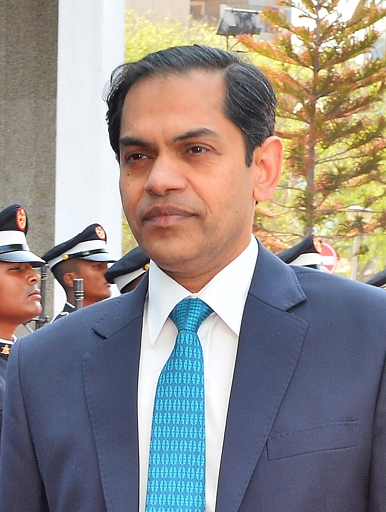

Ambassador of India to United Arab Emirates
- In office 26 November 2021 – 30 September 2025
- Preceded by: Pavan Kapoor
- Succeeded by: Dr. Deepak Mittal

High Commissioner of India to Maldives
- In office 3 March 2019 – 23 October 2021
- Preceded by: Akhilesh Mishra
- Succeeded by: Munu Mahawar

Personal details
- Born: India
- Children: 2
- Education: IIT Delhi; University of Oxford
- Occupation: former diplomat

Sunjay Sudhir is a retired Indian diplomat of the Indian Foreign Service. He served as Ambassador of India to the United Arab Emirates from September 2021 to October 2025. He previously served as High Commissioner of India to Maldives from 2019 to 2021.

== Career ==
Sunjay Sudhir joined the Indian Foreign Service in 1993. In his diplomatic career, he has served in different Indian Missions abroad include Consul General of India in Sydney (2014–15); Counsellor at the Permanent Mission of India to the World Trade Organization, Geneva (2007–11), Head of the Economic and Commercial Wing at the Indian High Commission, Colombo (2004–07), Second Secretary (Political, Information and Culture) at the Indian Embassy, Damascus (1997-2000) and Third Secretary at the Indian Embassy, Cairo (1995–97). His postings at Headquarters include Joint Secretary and Head of the Office of External Affairs Minister (2012–14), Joint Secretary (SAARC), Deputy Chief of Protocol (2002–04), and in the Europe West Division (2000)

He also holds a degree of Bachelor of Technology from the IIT Delhi and has pursued diplomatic studies at Oxford University (UK). In international Trade, Sudhir has done Certificate Courses on TRIPS Agreement and Public Health, WTO Law and Jurisprudence, and WTO Dispute Settlement. In energy, he has been director on the boards of ONGC Videsh Ltd, Oil India Ltd and Indian Strategic Petroleum Reserves Ltd. He is currently an associate editor on the editorial board of OPEC Energy Review.

== Personal life ==
Sunjay Sudhir is married and has two children.
