= M. P. M. Menon =

Indian diplomat

Muthal Puredath Murlidhar Menon
- Born: 10 July 1942; Angadipuram, Kerala, India
- Died: 25 January 2013 (aged 70)
- Occupation: diplomat
- Spouse: Shanta Menon (married 1972)
- Children: 2

Muthal Puredath Muralidhara Menon (10 July 1942 – 25 January 2013) was an Indian diplomat, ambassador to Bahrain, Maldives, United Arab Emirates and Brazil.

== Early life ==
Menon was born in Angadipuram, Malappuram District, Kerala on 10 July 1942. His mother was M.P. Narayanikutty Menon, and father was V.P.K. Nair. He was the grandnephew of the famous freedom fighter and Malabar rebellion leader, M.P. Narayana Menon. Being a member of the matrilineal Nair society, his family name was taken from his mother's side of the family.

He attended college is the Guruvayurappan College in Calicut, on a scholarship. Upon graduation, he worked as a teacher, and then as a chemist in the explosives factory in Aruvankadu. He then joined the Indian Army Short Services Commission, which had been established in the aftermath of the India-China War of 1962. After serving in the Indian Army for 5 years, he took the Indian civil service exam and joined the Indian Foreign Service.

== Diplomatic career ==
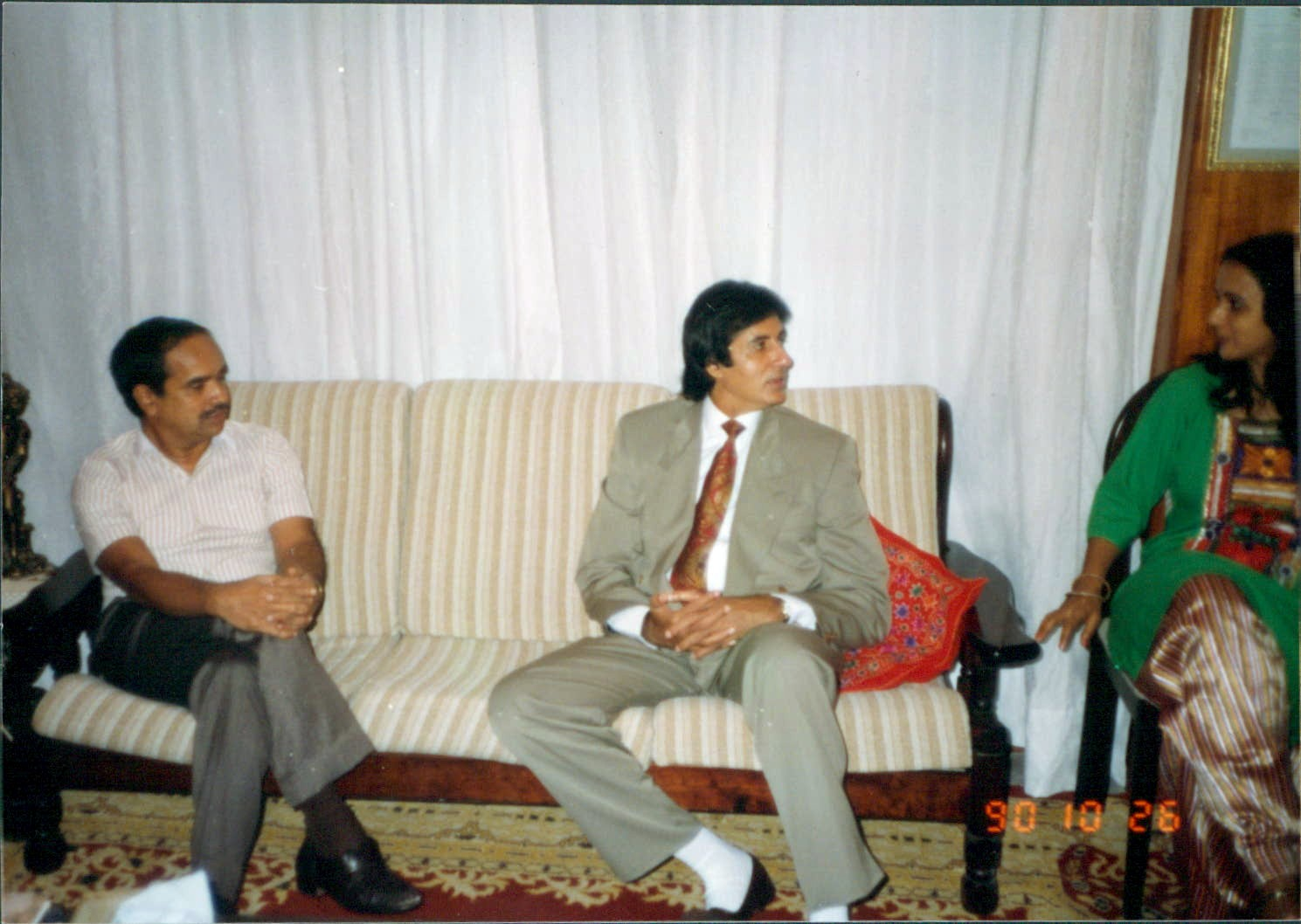
With Bollywood actor Amitabh Bachchan, in Menon's house

Menon's first posting was in Warsaw, Poland. He served there from 1974 to 1977. His next posting was in Moscow, Soviet Union. His boss, the Indian Ambassador to the Soviet Union, was the future Prime Minister of India, I. K. Gujral. This was the period of the Janata Government under Morarji Desai. There was an important visit by Atal Bihari Vajpayee, the Indian Foreign Minister, who later rose to become the Indian Prime Minister.

His next posting was to Tripoli, Libya in 1980. The leader of Libya was Muammar Gaddafi. The country was also a source of oil for India, and home to a large Indian expatriate population. There were constant issues about worker rights, which was difficult to enforce in a dictatorship. On one occasion, Gaddafi summoned Menon, and his boss, the Indian Ambassador, and asked them to take his private aircraft, and bring the Indian Prime Minister Indira Gandhi over to Tripoli. He then sent his wife to fetch Indira Gandhi from New Delhi.

After Libya, he was transferred to New Delhi in 1983. He took part in the first SAARC meeting, and travelled extensively to India's neighbouring countries. These included multiple trips to Pakistan, where he was shown tremendous hospitality when people found out that he was from India.

== Ambassadorial postings ==
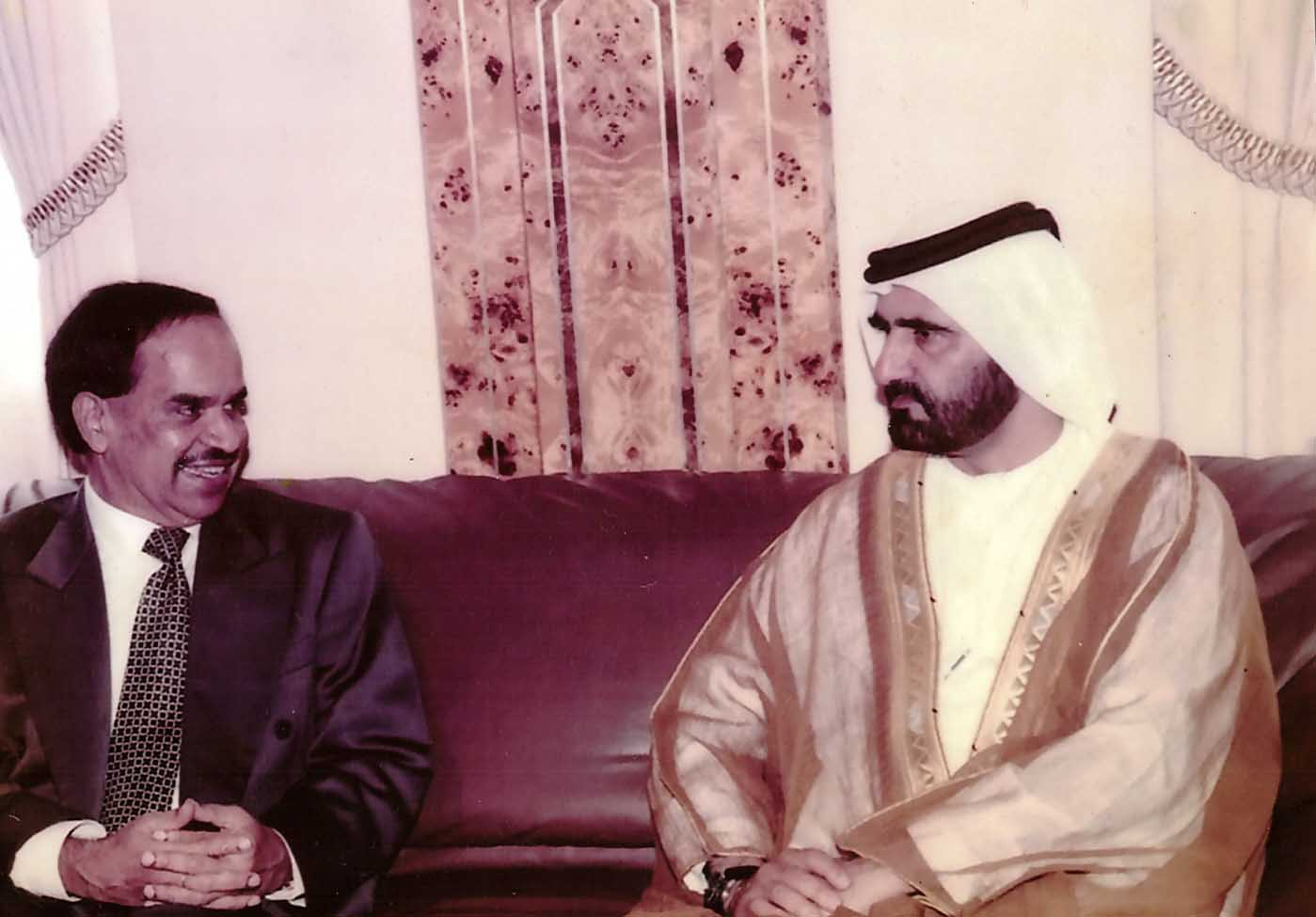
With Sheikh Mohammed bin Rashid Al Maktoum

=== Bahrain ===
In 1986, Murali Menon was transferred to Bahrain. There was a large community of Indian expatriates, some of whom, like Jashanmal, had been in Bahrain for over 50 years. Out of a total population of 400,000 persons, Indians comprised around 80,000. They were from all parts of India, though the majority of the Indians were from Menon's home state of Kerala. In order to coordinate the different Indian associations, he created the Coordination Committee of Indian Associations (CCIA).

=== Maldives ===
Menon arrived in Maldives soon after the attempted coup against President Gayoom, by foreign mercenaries. This attempt was crushed with the help of the Indian Army. Due to its strategic location, there were several visits from Indian Prime Ministers, Ministers, and other dignitaries during his tenure.

=== Canada ===
Menon took over as the Indian Consul General in 1992. This was during the height of the Khalistan movement, which received significant support from the Sikh expatriates in Canada. However, there was no security incident during his tenure. In order to show the integration of Sikhs with India, he attended a gurudwara function, thus becoming the first Indian diplomat to officially attend a Sikh religious function in his official capacity, since the Khalistan issue erupted in the 1980s.

=== United Arab Emirates ===
In 1994, Menon was transferred to Abu Dhabi, United Arab Emirates. As soon as he took over, the 1994 plague epidemic in Surat took place. He had to plead with the President of the UAE, to allow Indians who were stranded in India, to be allowed to come back and resume their jobs. Due to WHO clearances, the UAE lifted the ban on flights from India.

The next major initiative was to have an amnesty for Indians living in the UAE illegally. Since there were immigration controls while leaving UAE, these people, who had overstayed their visas, could not leave without being arrested. Menon worked with the UAE government, and Ambassadors from fellow South Asian countries like Pakistan, Sri Lanka and Bangladesh, to have an amnesty for illegals to go back to their home country. Over 100,000 people availed of this facility to leave the UAE.

One of his favourite ways to build good relations with the Indian community was to remember the birthdays of a large number of people. He would do this even years after he was retired.

=== Brazil ===
In 1998, Mr. Menon was transferred to Brasília, Brazil amid a growing era of cooperation between Brazil and India, the largest democracies in South America and Asia, respectively, while in economics, the two were noted as similar emerging markets through the BRIC concept as proposed by Jim O'Neill. This included cooperation between the Indian and Brazilian Space Programs.

== Post-retirement ==
After retiring from the Indian Foreign Service, Menon took part in various seminars and boards. Among them was the Inland Water Transport, India-Brazil-South Africa (IBSA) Cooperation and India International Centre seminars on Latin America.
