= Talmiz Ahmad =

Indian diplomat

Talmiz Ahmad تلمیذ احمد

India Ambassador to Saudi Arabia
- In office 2000–2003

India Ambassador to Oman
- In office 2003–2004

Indian Ambassador to UAE
- In office 2007–2010

India Ambassador to Saudi Arabia
- In office 2010–2011

Personal details
- Born: 1951 (age 74–75)
- Occupation: Diplomat, writer
- Writing career
- Notable works: The Islamist Challenge in West Asia: Doctrinal and Political Competitions after the Arab Spring

Talmiz Ahmad (Urdu: تلمیذ احمد; born 1951), is an Indian diplomat and joined the Indian Foreign Service in 1974, and served as Indian Ambassador to Saudi Arabia (2000–03; 2010–11); Oman (2003–04), and the UAE (2007–10). He was Additional Secretary for International Cooperation in the Ministry of Petroleum and Natural Gas in 2004-06. In 2006-07, he was Director General of the Indian Council of World Affairs, New Delhi. In July 2011, the Saudi Government conferred on him the King Abdul Aziz Medal First Class for his contribution to the promotion of Indo-Saudi relations. After retirement from Foreign Service, he is working with an energy company in Dubai.

He has published four books: Reform in the Arab World: External Influences and Regional Debates (2005), Children of Abraham at War: the Clash of Messianic Militarisms (2010), The Islamist Challenge in West Asia: Doctrinal and Political Competitions (published in August 2013, after the Arab Spring), and West Asia at War: Repression, Resistance and Great Power Games (2022).

He writes and lectures frequently on the politics of West Asia, political Islam and energy security issues. Presently he is a Visiting Distinguished Fellow at ORF.

== See also ==
- Abid Hussain
- Syed Akbaruddin
