= The Chattri =

War memorial in Brighton and Hove, England

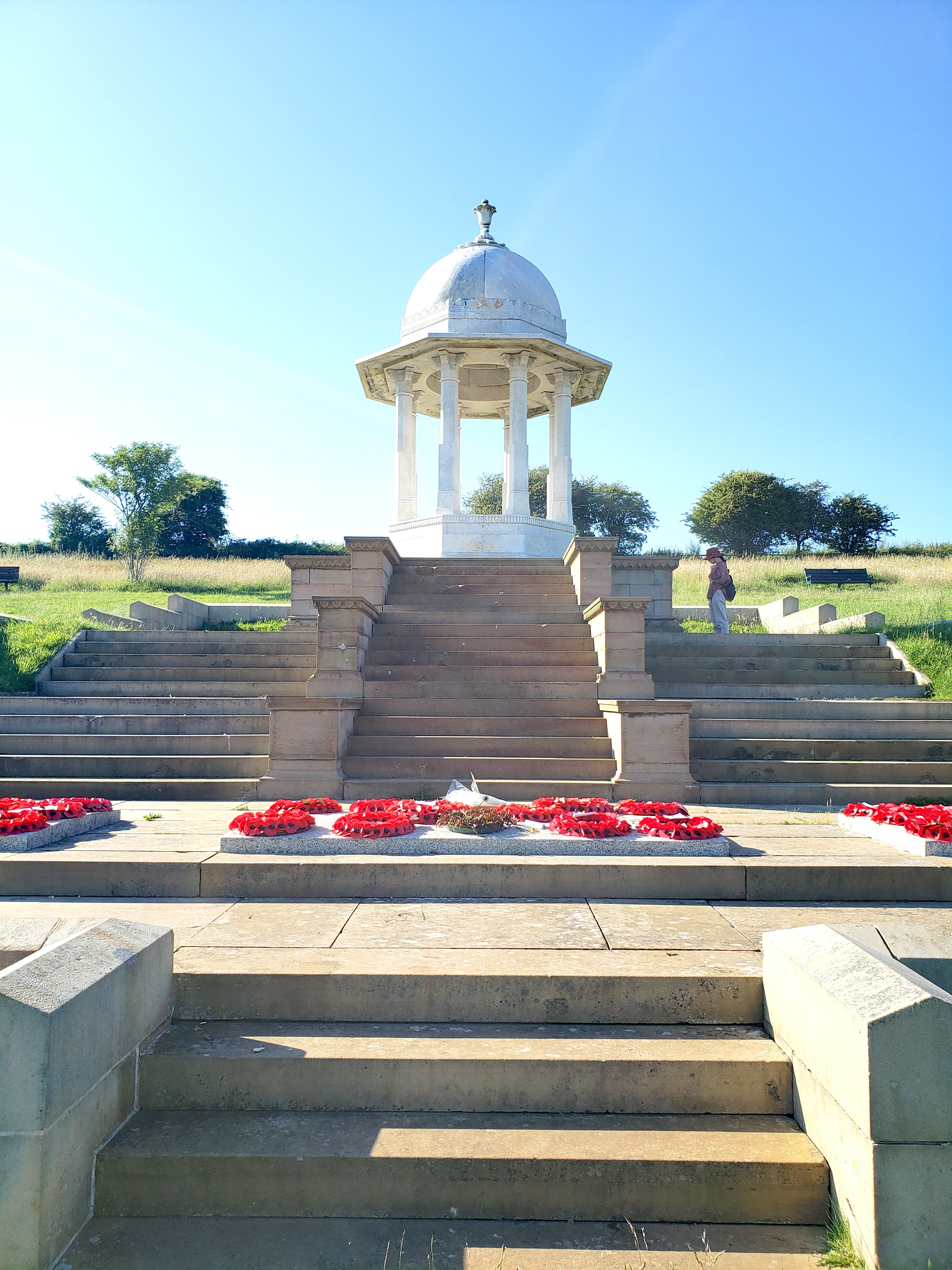
- For Indian soldiers who died in hospital in Brighton
- Unveiled: 1 February 1921
- Location: 50°53′3″N 0°8′49″W; Patcham, Brighton and Hove, England
- Designed by: E. C. Henriques

Listed Building – Grade II
- Official name: The Chattri
- Designated: 20 August 1971
- Reference no.: 1379911

The Chattri is a First World War memorial near Patcham (part of the city of Brighton and Hove) on the south coast of England. It was unveiled in 1921 in memory of 74 Indian soldiers who died in military hospitals in Brighton, particularly the 53 Hindus and Sikhs who were cremated on the site. More than a million Indians fought in the British Indian Army during the First World War (1914–1918), of whom 140,000 served in Europe. Over 4,300 were treated in temporary hospitals in Brighton between December 1914 and February 1916 and the Hindus and Sikhs who died there were cremated at a remote hilltop location. A proposal for a memorial on the cremation site was advanced by the mayor of Brighton and funding was agreed between the local council and the British government.

The monument was designed by Elias Cosmas Henriques under the supervision of Sir Samuel Swinton Jacob, and takes the form of a chattri or chhatri ('umbrella' in several Indian languages), an elevated dome-shaped pavilion. The dome is in white marble and stands on one end of a grey stone terrace, which covers the ghats (funeral pyres) used for the cremations. The unveiling ceremony took place on 1 February 1921, presided over by Edward, Prince of Wales. The monument was subsequently allowed to fall into disrepair and was damaged by rifle practice in the Second World War. The Royal British Legion organised a pilgrimage to the Chattri in 1932 and then annually from 1951 to 1999, when the ceremony was taken over by the local Sikh community.

Academics have suggested that the Chattri's purpose was to promote Indian unity within the British Empire and to show that the Indian casualties were treated with respect. Susan Ashley suggested that its neglect after the unveiling ceremony was evidence of the British government's insincerity, but that it had been repurposed by the local community. The Commonwealth War Graves Commission unveiled a separate memorial on the same site in 2010. The Chattri is a Grade II listed building.

== Background: Indian soldiers in Brighton ==
The United Kingdom entered the First World War in August 1914 and began deploying troops to France and Belgium. At the time, India was part of the British Empire and the Indian Army was under British command. The British government quickly decided to deploy Indian soldiers to the Western Front, although the Indian Army was generally only used in South Asia and had never previously fought in a European conflict. The deployment was intended to alleviate manpower shortages and simultaneously curb rising Indian nationalism by instilling imperial pride. The first Indian troops were dispatched in late August 1914, and arrived in France in October.

Soldiers wounded on the battlefield were initially treated in field hospitals. Those only lightly wounded were generally returned quickly to the front but many of those requiring further treatment were evacuated to England. Brighton, being a resort town on the south coast and close to major ports, was well-positioned to accommodate the evacuees. Three temporary hospitals were established in the town—one in the workhouse, one in the grammar school, and one in the Royal Pavilion complex, a former royal palace known for its Oriental-style architecture. In December 1914, 345 injured soldiers were transferred to the hospitals in Brighton by train. Careful arrangements were made to provide for the different dietary and religious requirements of the Hindus, Sikhs, and Muslims. The wounded Indians became something of a tourist attraction; among dignitaries who visited the pavilion during their stay were Lord Kitchener, King George V, and Queen Mary.

Over the course of the war, more than a million Indians fought for the British Empire, of whom 140,000 saw service in France and Belgium. Over 4,300 Indian soldiers were treated in hospitals in Brighton, of whom 74 died of their wounds. The British authorities considered it of great importance that the dead received the appropriate funeral rites for their religion. The 21 Muslim men who died were taken to the Shah Jahan Mosque in Woking, Surrey, and buried in a purpose-built cemetery. The bodies of the 53 Hindus and Sikhs were taken to a remote location near Patcham, high in the South Downs hills, where a ghat (open-air funeral pyre) was built and the bodies were cremated. There was some debate as to whether open-air cremation was legal in the UK under the Cremation Act 1902, so government sanction was required to allow these funerals to take place. Photographs of the deceased were taken, which were sent to their relatives in India along with a portion of their ashes. The remainder of the ashes were scattered in the sea. The Brighton hospitals ceased to accommodate Indian soldiers in February 1916 and the facilities were converted to treat British amputees. The reason the Patcham site was chosen is unknown.

== Inception ==
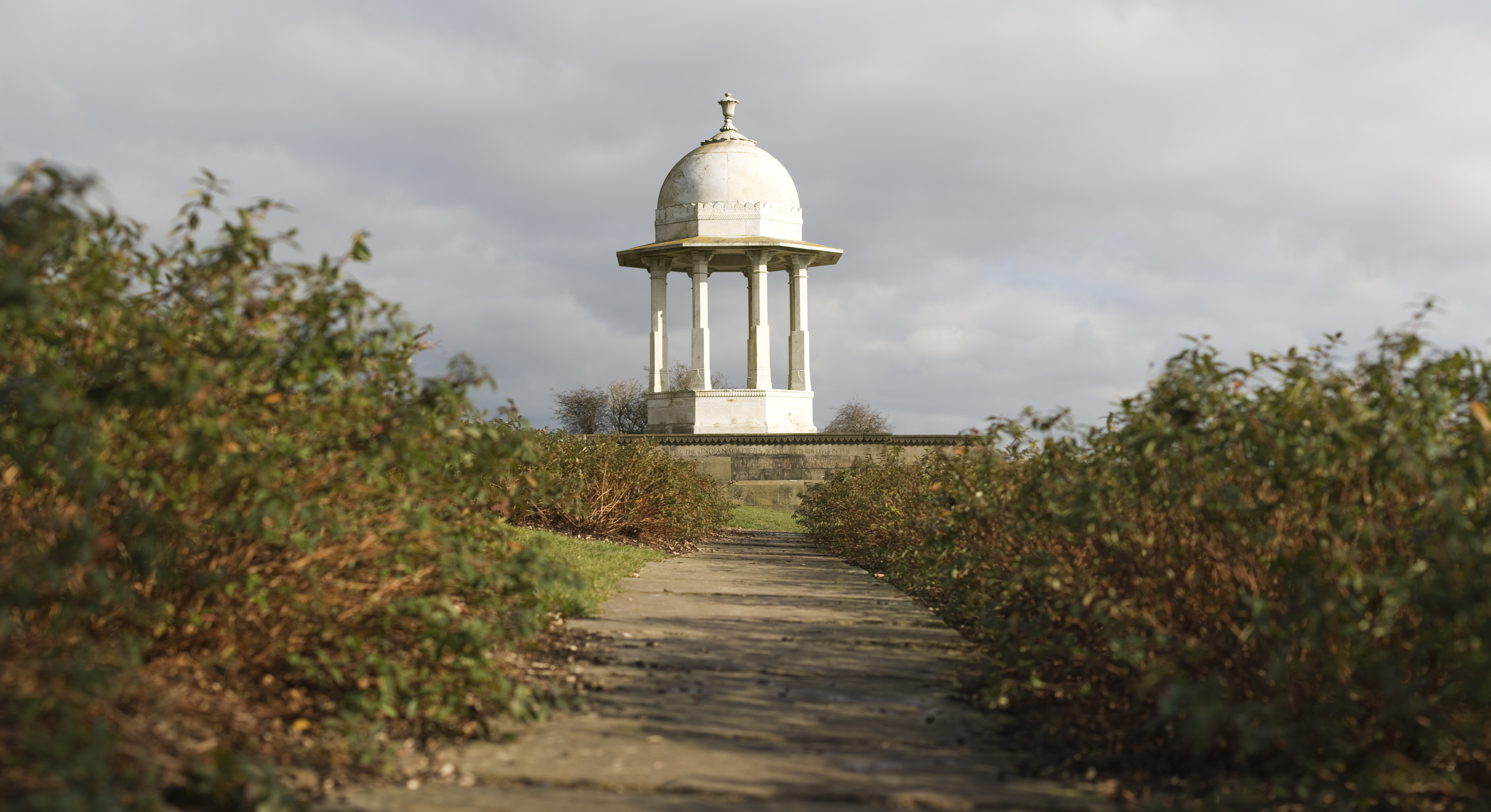
The Chattri from the southwest

In August 1915, soon after the final cremations, Lieutenant Das Gupta of the Indian Medical Service approached the Mayor of Brighton, Sir John Otter, with a proposal for a memorial on the site of the ghat. Otter left office shortly afterwards, but chaired Brighton's Indian Memorials Committee and became the driving force behind the Chattri project. He proposed two memorials—one on the site of the ghat, and another in Brighton town centre. The latter became the Indian Memorial Gate, a monumental entrance to the Royal Pavilion complex built in a similar style to the Chattri. The site of the ghat and the surrounding land were owned by the Marquess of Abergavenny, who donated the land to the Borough of Brighton in 1916. Otter sent his proposal to the India Office (the British government department responsible for administering India), which agreed to share the cost of the Chattri.

Otter approached the retired architect Sir Samuel Swinton Jacob to work on the memorial project. Jacob had worked extensively in India and was widely associated with the Indo-Saracenic architectural style and, in particular, was known for his use of chhatri, elevated domes supported on pillars. The word chhatri or chattri means 'umbrella' in multiple Indic languages, including Hindi, Punjabi, and Urdu. Jacob, 75 years old, declined the commission on the grounds of age but recommended Elias Cosmas Henriques. Henriques, a junior architect from Bombay who worked for the Indian government, was studying in England. Jacob acted as supervising architect. Henriques waived his fee and accepted only reimbursement of expenses.

Funds were raised and Henriques completed his design by 1917. The memorial was to be made of Sicilian marble, but the stone could not be extracted during the war. Construction work started in August 1920 and continued until the end of that year. A cottage was provided nearby for a caretaker. This added £1,117 (£43,200 in 2025) to the final cost of £4,964 (£191,800 in 2025).

== Design and setting ==
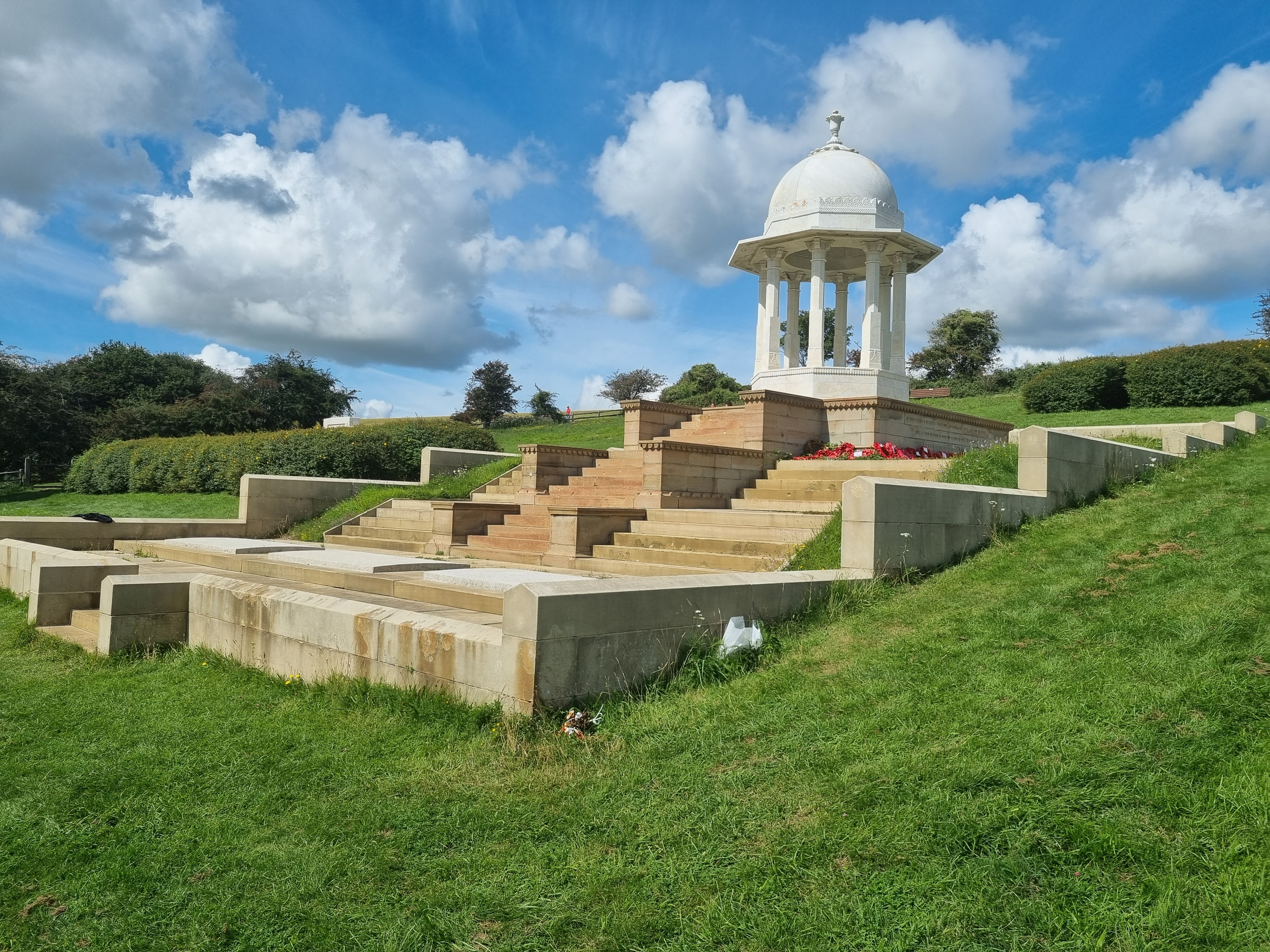
Levels of the monument showing stone wall, dome, and terrace with granite slabs marking the ghats

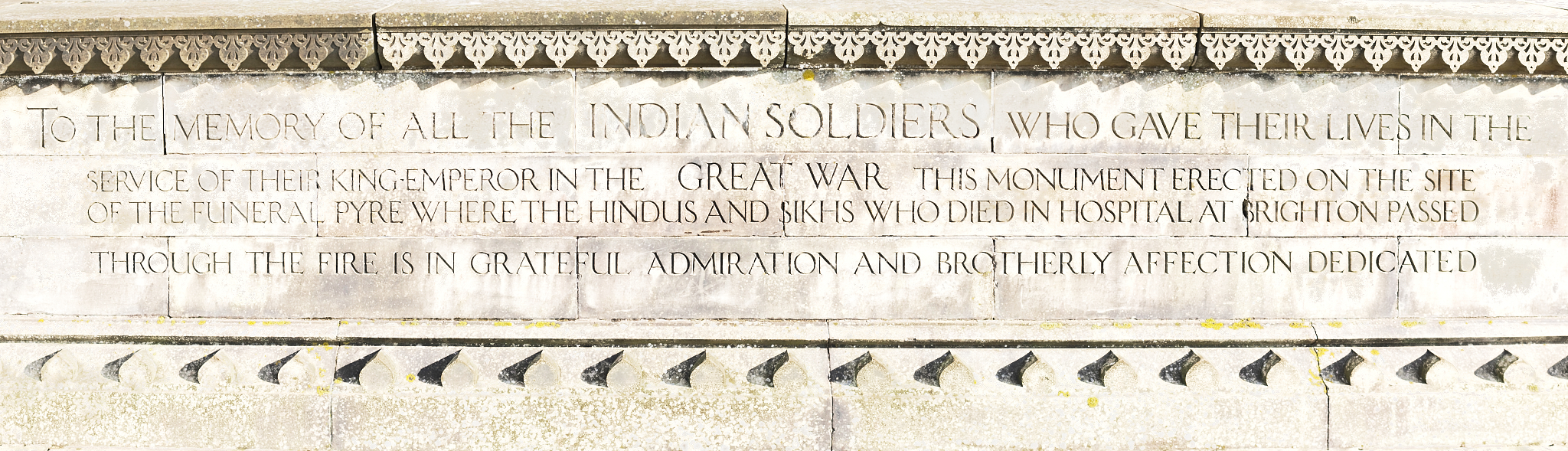
Inscription on The Chattri's base

The Chattri was built at the exact location where the funeral pyres were constructed for the cremation of the 53 soldiers. It is in an isolated position on the South Downs north of Brighton, 500 feet (150 m) above sea level, offering views of the town, the surrounding area, and the sea. It is roughly a mile and a quarter (two kilometres) north of All Saints Church, Patcham. The only access to the memorial is via a path off a bridleway that leaves the A27 Brighton Bypass at Patcham.

The main part of the monument is a dome (chattri) of white Sicilian marble in the Mughal style. Roughly the shape of an umbrella, it stands on a 40-by-60-foot (12-by-18-metre) base set within two acres (0.8 hectares) of landscaped garden and rises 30 feet (9.1 m) to the finial at its apex. The dome is supported by eight columns, which start with square bases before becoming octagonal halfway up. The columns terminate in decorative capitals with each column having four brackets projecting from it and wide overhanging eaves. A low stone wall surrounds the structure, with a flight of steps providing access.

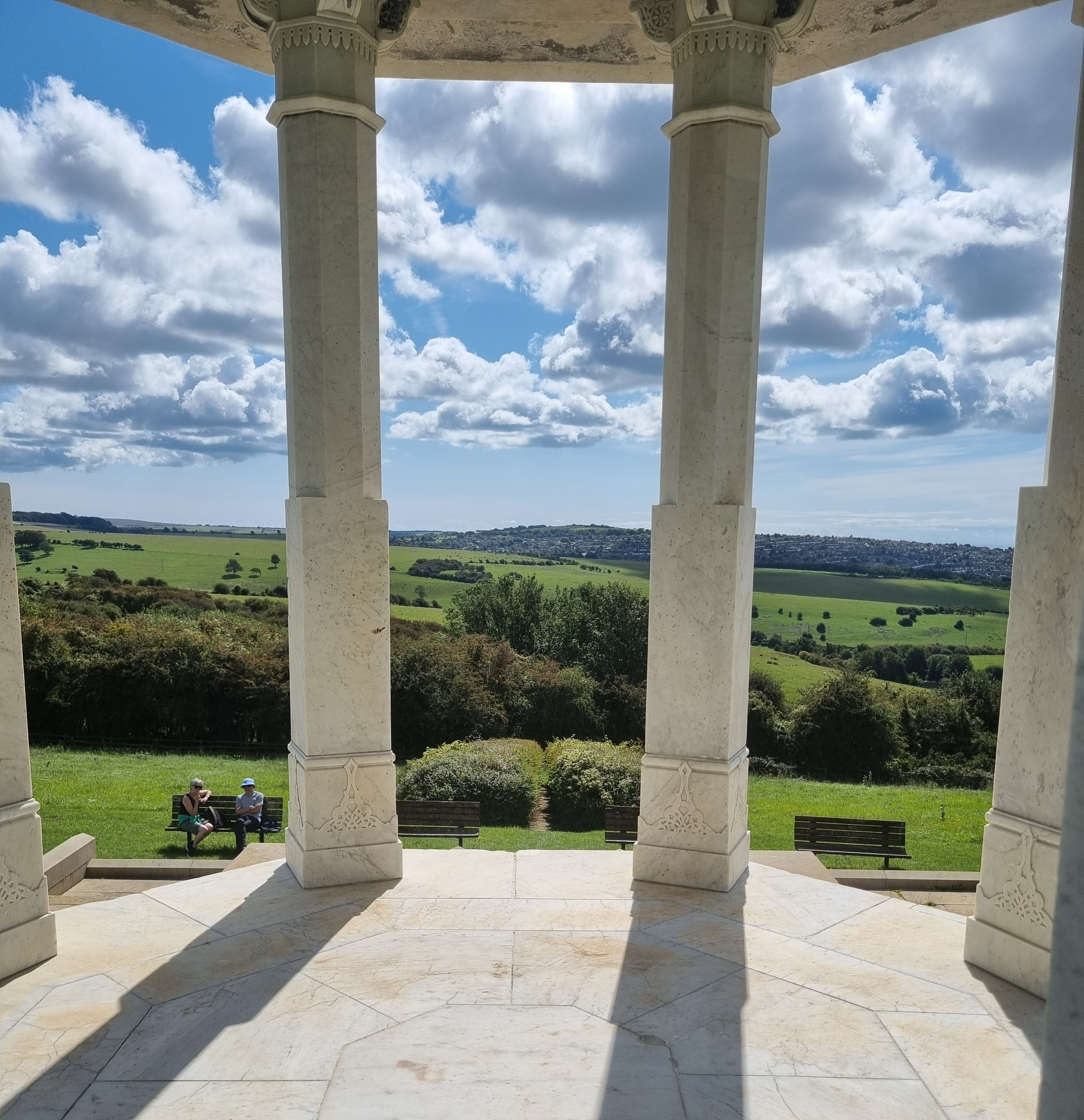
Looking south towards the sea, showing the sculpted columns

The monument sits on a square plinth of grey stone which is stepped down four times on the south-eastern side to a terrace upon which stands three granite blocks covering the sites of the cremation ghats. The plinth bears an inscription in English, Hindi, Punjabi, and Urdu, the text of which was prepared by Sir John Otter:

To the memory of all Indian soldiers who gave their lives for the King-Emperor in the Great War, this monument, erected on the site of the funeral pyre where Hindus and Sikhs who died in hospital at Brighton passed through the fire, is in grateful admiration and brotherly love dedicated.

== Unveiling ==
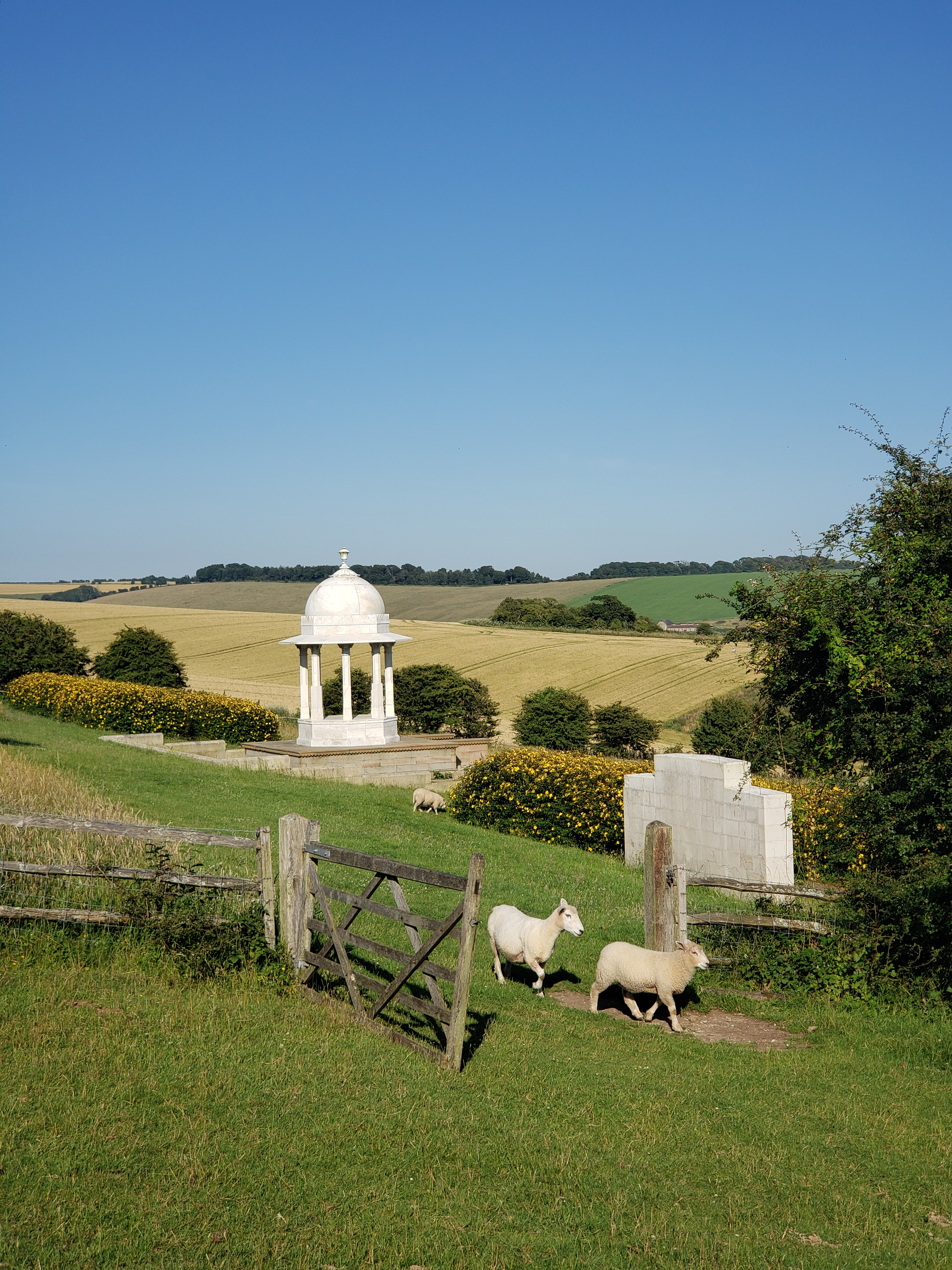
Entrance to the Chattri enclosure, showing the landscaped gardens and the later memorial tablet.

Otter initially approached the Duke of Connaught (a member of the royal family and army officer who had served in India) to unveil the Chattri, but the duke was due to be out of the country on the proposed date. The unveiling ceremony was held on 1 February 1921 and Edward, Prince of Wales, presided. Before the ceremony, the Chattri was draped in the flag of the British Raj. Also present were Sir William Meyer, the first Indian high commissioner; three members of the Council of India—General Sir Edmund Barrow, Sir James Brunyate, and Sir Murray Hammick; officials from the India Office; and several senior army officers, who all travelled with the prince by special train. The mayor and mayoress of Brighton and Otter joined at Brighton railway station and the party proceeded by car to Patcham, greeted by enthusiastic crowds along the route. Only two native Indians were part of the prince's entourage—Bhawanrao Shriniwasrao Pant Pratinidhi, the raja (prince) of the Indian state of Aundh, and St. Nihal Singh, a journalist. A film crew and several press photographers attended.

Otter gave a speech in which he outlined the planning for the memorial and paid tribute to the men it commemorates. He told the crowd: "Brighton aspires today to speak in the name of the nation" in sending a message to India "that we honour their slain—slain in the bloody, cruel war which has scarred the world". Otter also expressed hope that the memorial would "strengthen ties between India and [the UK]". The prince gave a brief speech following Otter, in which he remarked:

It is befitting that we should remember, and that future generations should not forget, that our Indian comrades came when our need was highest, free men and voluntary soldiers who were true to their salt [...] When the wounded Indian soldiers were brought to England, there was no place ready for their reception, and your generous town came to the rescue, and, with a hospitality which will ever be remembered in India, gave not only her finest buildings, but gave also her friendship and respect to those gallant men.

The prince then pulled the flag away and the ceremony concluded with a 21-gun salute and the sounding of "The Last Post" and the "Reveille" by military buglers. According to Singh, "When the Prince of Wales pulled the cord which disclosed the memorial to view, one immediately realised that the young Indian artist [Henriques] had succeeded in imparting Indian feeling to it"; in his article covering the day's events, Singh recorded that he was "impressed with the genuine gratitude which the British feel towards India for the help she gave them in their hour of crisis".

According to the art historian Tim Barringer, the intended audience of the ceremony was India—although nationalist tensions had been set aside during the war, they were gaining momentum again by 1921. During the war, the British authorities had been keen to show that they were sufficiently respectful of the Indian dead. This extended to the correct funerary rites, the exception to the law to allow the open-air pyre, and to the construction of the Chattri. Lakhbir Jassal, in the journal Human Geography, described the rituals as "imperial paternalism". Susan Ashley, an academic specialising in cultural heritage, argued in 2016 that the abandonment of the Chattri by the British government after the unveiling ceremony proved that the intent behind its construction was imperialistic and constituted a "symbolic performance". Nonetheless, she suggested that its later adoption by the community gave it a new purpose and that, as a result, "the emphasis was re-placed on the men who were cremated on this spot". Barringer, writing in 2022, called the Chattri a "hybrid structure", "both local and global in address"—although it was "conceived as an act of eulogy", Barringer argued that it reinforced "the ideology of white supremacy upon which the British Empire rested".

== Later history ==
Responsibility for the maintenance of the Chattri fell to the Borough of Brighton but in the years after the unveiling it was allowed to fall into disrepair. By the 1930s, the caretaker had died; no replacement was appointed and the cottage was demolished. The Imperial War Graves Commission (IWGC) and the India Office prompted the Borough Corporation into action in 1924, but complaints about the condition of the site continued. In 1939, the IWGC drew up a maintenance plan, which included abandoning 2 acres (0.81 ha) of surrounding land to focus on the monument itself. This was agreed, though the corporation was reluctant to pay for the restoration works and postponed them to 1942. By then, the Second World War was underway and the land had been requisitioned for military use, so repairs were delayed further. The area was used for rifle practice and by the end of the war the Chattri was peppered with bullet holes. The military agreed to cover the cost of repair and restoration works when it relinquished the land in 1946.

The Royal British Legion (RBL) organised a pilgrimage to the Chattri on 18 September 1932, the first major event since the unveiling in 1921. The service included local dignitaries and military veterans, as well as Sir Bhupendra Nath Mitra, the Indian high commissioner. The RBL resurrected the event in 1951 and it was held annually until 1999 when the Legion decided it was unable to continue organising the event, citing the age of its members and the difficulty of reaching the site. In the same year, historian Anthony Kushner observed that the Indian soldiers receive little coverage in the modern cultural history of Brighton, and that "the Chattri [...] is now rather neglected, unpublicized and inaccessible to the many tourists the town attracts". The Indian community in Brighton and the wider UK were outraged by the decision to abandon the ceremony, some accusing the RBL of racism and of deliberately not consulting them before the decision. A local Sikh teacher took on the responsibility, and a public ceremony has been held annually since 2000 on the third Sunday in June. The event is supported by local Hindu and Sikh community groups, the armed forces, and veterans' associations. Attendees have included descendants of those commemorated by the Chattri. The 2000 ceremony was sparsely attended but the event grew in popularity from the following year. Since the change of leadership, the ceremony has shifted from largely Christian themes and British military traditions into a hybrid which also includes Sikh prayers, the reading of Indian poems, and speeches from Indian ex-service personnel.

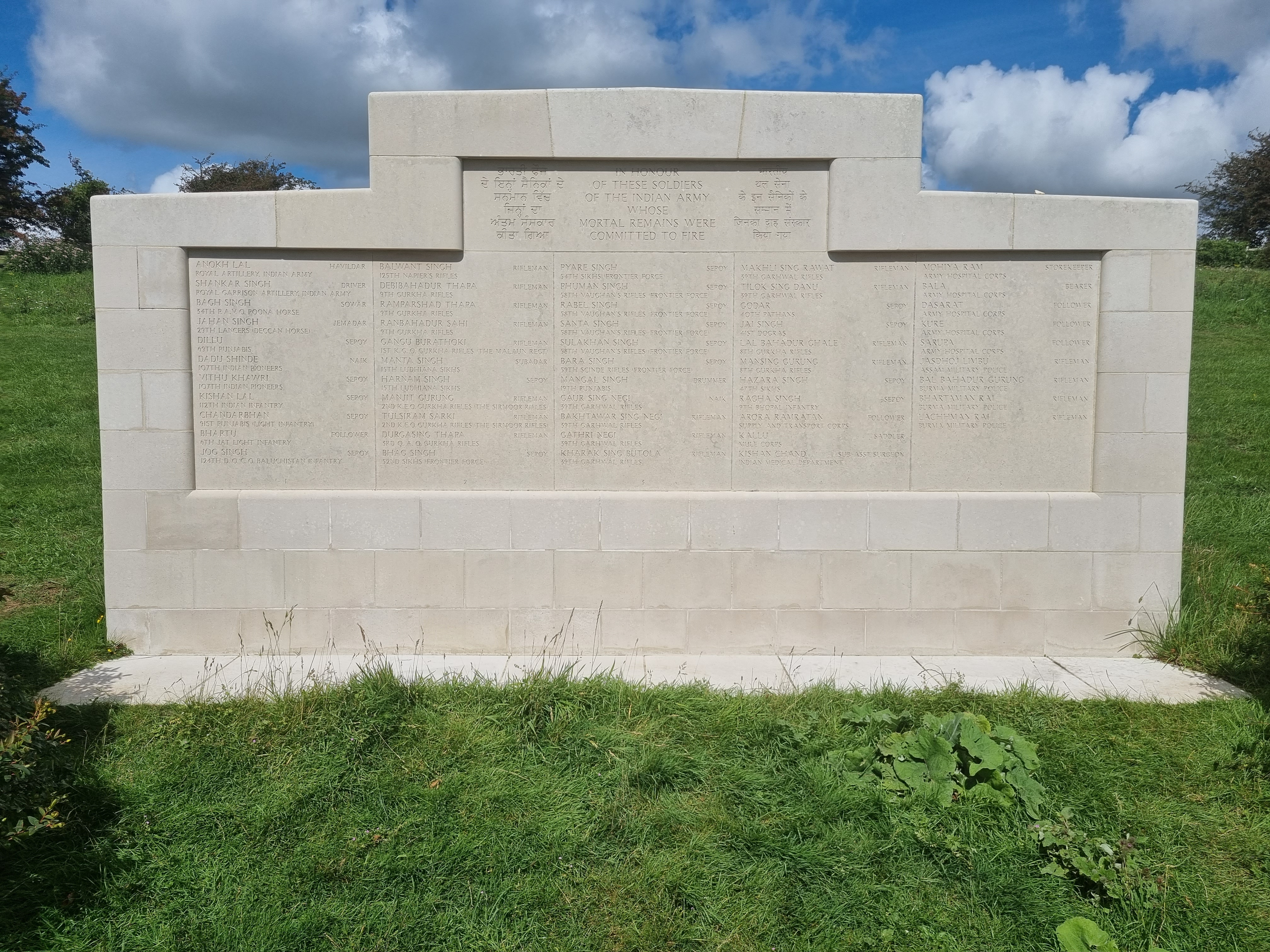
The Commonwealth War Graves Commission memorial (built in 2010) adjacent to the Chattri

In September 2010, the IWGC (by then renamed the Commonwealth War Graves Commission) built a separate memorial next to the Chattri, as part of a project to highlight the role of Indian soldiers in the world wars, which it believed was often overlooked. This memorial is a stone wall engraved with the names of the Hindu and Sikh dead and the dedication "In honour of those soldiers of the Indian Army whose mortal remains were committed to fire". Previously, the names were split between the Hollybrook Memorial in Southampton and the Neuve-Chapelle Memorial, the main Indian Army memorial in France, close to where several of the casualties fought.

The Chattri has been a Grade II listed building since August 1971. Listed building status provides legal protection from unauthorised demolition or modification. The surrounding land is owned by Brighton and Hove City Council. The land was designated a "centenary field" in 2017 as part of a project by the charity Fields in Trust and the Royal British Legion to conserve public spaces connected to the First World War.

== See also ==
- Grade II listed buildings in Brighton and Hove: C–D
- List of public art in Brighton and Hove
