= List of high commissioners of India to the United Kingdom =

High Commissioner of India to the United Kingdom

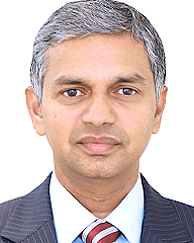
- Incumbent; Periasamy Kumaran since 13 May 2026
- Style: His Excellency
- Residence: 9 Kensington Palace Gardens, London
- Nominator: Droupadi Murmu
- Inaugural holder: V. K. Krishna Menon
- Formation: 1947
- Website: https://www.hcilondon.gov.in/

The High Commissioner of India to the United Kingdom is the head of the High Commission of India to the United Kingdom. The High Commission is located at India House in London.

== History ==
In 1919, a committee chaired by the Marquess of Crewe determined there existed the need to separate the agency work of the India Office from its other political and administrative roles, and recommended the transfer of all such work to "a High Commissioner for India or some similar Indian Governmental Representative in London." It was also felt popular opinion in India would view this as a step towards full Dominion status for India. The Government of India Act that same year upheld the recommendations of the committee, making provision for "the appointment of a High Commissioner by His Majesty by Order in Council, which might delegate to the official any of the contractual powers of the Secretary of State [for India] in Council, and prescribe the conditions under which he should act on behalf of the Government of India or any Provincial Government."

On 13 August 1920, King-Emperor George V issued the required Order in Council. Until India became independent in 1947, the post was styled High Commission for India. The first High Commissioner for India was Indian Civil Service officer Sir William Stevenson Meyer; the first of Indian origin was Sir Dadiba Merwanji Dalal. The High Commissioner enjoyed the same status as his counterparts from the British Dominions. Upon Indian independence, the post was given the present designation.

== High Commissioners for India (1920–1947) ==
List of High Commissioner for India

Name	Portrait	Assumed office	Left office	Notes
Sir William Stevenson Meyer GCIE, KCSI		September 1920	October 1922	
J. W. Bhore CBE		October 1922	April 1923	(acting)
Sir Dadiba Merwanji Dalal CIE		April 1923	December 1924	First High Commissioner of Indian origin
Sir Atul Chandra Chatterjee KCSI, KCIE		1925	1931	
Sir Bhupendra Nath Mitra KCSI, KCIE, CBE		1931	1936	
Malik Sir Feroz Khan Noon KCSI, KCIE, Kt.		1936	December 1941	
Khan Bahadur Maulvi Sir Muhammad Aziz-ul-Haq CIE		December 1941	May 1943	
Dewan Bahadur Sir Samuel Ebenezer Runganadhan		May 1943	April 1947	
M. K. Vellodi CIE		April 1947	August 1947	(acting)

== High Commissioners of India to the United Kingdom (1947–present) ==
List of former High Commissioners

=== Dominion of India (1947-1950) ===
List of former High Commissioners

Name	Portrait	Assumed office	Left office	Notes
V. K. Krishna Menon		August 1947	26 January 1950	

=== Republic of India (1950-present) ===
Name	Portrait	Assumed office	Left office	Notes
V. K. Krishna Menon		26 January 1950	1952	First High Commissioner of the Republic of India (from 26 January 1950)
B. G. Kher		1952	1954	Second Prime Minister of Bombay.
Vijaya Lakshmi Pandit		1954	1961	First woman President of the United Nations General Assembly.
M. C. Chagla		1962	1963	Earlier Chief Justice of Bombay High Court.
Jivraj Narayan Mehta		1963	1966	First Chief Minister of Gujarat.
S. S. Dhawan		1968	1969	
Appa B. Pant		15 September 1969	12 October 1972	
Braj Kumar Nehru		1973	1977	Earlier Ambassador of India to the United States. Served as Governor of seven Indian states over two decades.
N. G. Gore		1977	1979	
V.A. Seyid Muhammad		1980	1984	
P. Mehrotra		July 1984	December 1984	
P. C. Alexander		1985	1987	Later Governor of Tamil Nadu and Governor of Maharashtra.
Maharaja Krishna Rasgotra		1988	1990	Later Foreign Secretary of India.
Kuldip Nayar		March 1990	November 1990	
Laxmi Mall Singhvi		1991	1997	Second longest tenure after K. V. Krishna Menon.
Salman Haidar		January 1998	July 1998	Later Foreign Secretary of India.
Lalit Mansingh		1998	1999	Later Foreign Secretary of India.
Nareshwar Dayal		2000	2002	
Ronen Sen		May 2002	April 2004	Later Ambassador of India to the United States.
Kamalesh Sharma		July 2004	January 2008	Later Commonwealth Secretary-General.
Shiv Shankar Mukherjee		January 2008	August 2009	
Nalin Surie		September 2009	August 2011	
Jaimini Bhagwati		February 2012	December 2013	
Ranjan Mathai		December 2013	December 2015	Later Foreign Secretary of India.
Navtej Sarna		January 2016	December 2016	Later Ambassador of India to the United States.
Yashvardhan Kumar Sinha		December 2016	October 2018	Current Chief Information Commissioner of India.
Ruchi Ghanashyam		November 2018	2 June 2020	She is the only second Woman High Commissioner to UK since 1947 after Vijaya Lakshmi Pandit
Gaitri Issar Kumar		3 June 2020	30 June 2022	
Vikram Doraiswami		22 September 2022	18 March 2026	Later Ambassador of India to China
Periasamy Kumaran		13 May 2026	Incumbent	
