= India–United Kingdom relations =

- United Kingdom: India

Diplomatic mission
- High Commission of the United Kingdom, New Delhi: High Commission of India, London

Envoy
- British High Commissioner to India Lindy Cameron: Indian High Commissioner to the United Kingdom Periasamy Kumaran

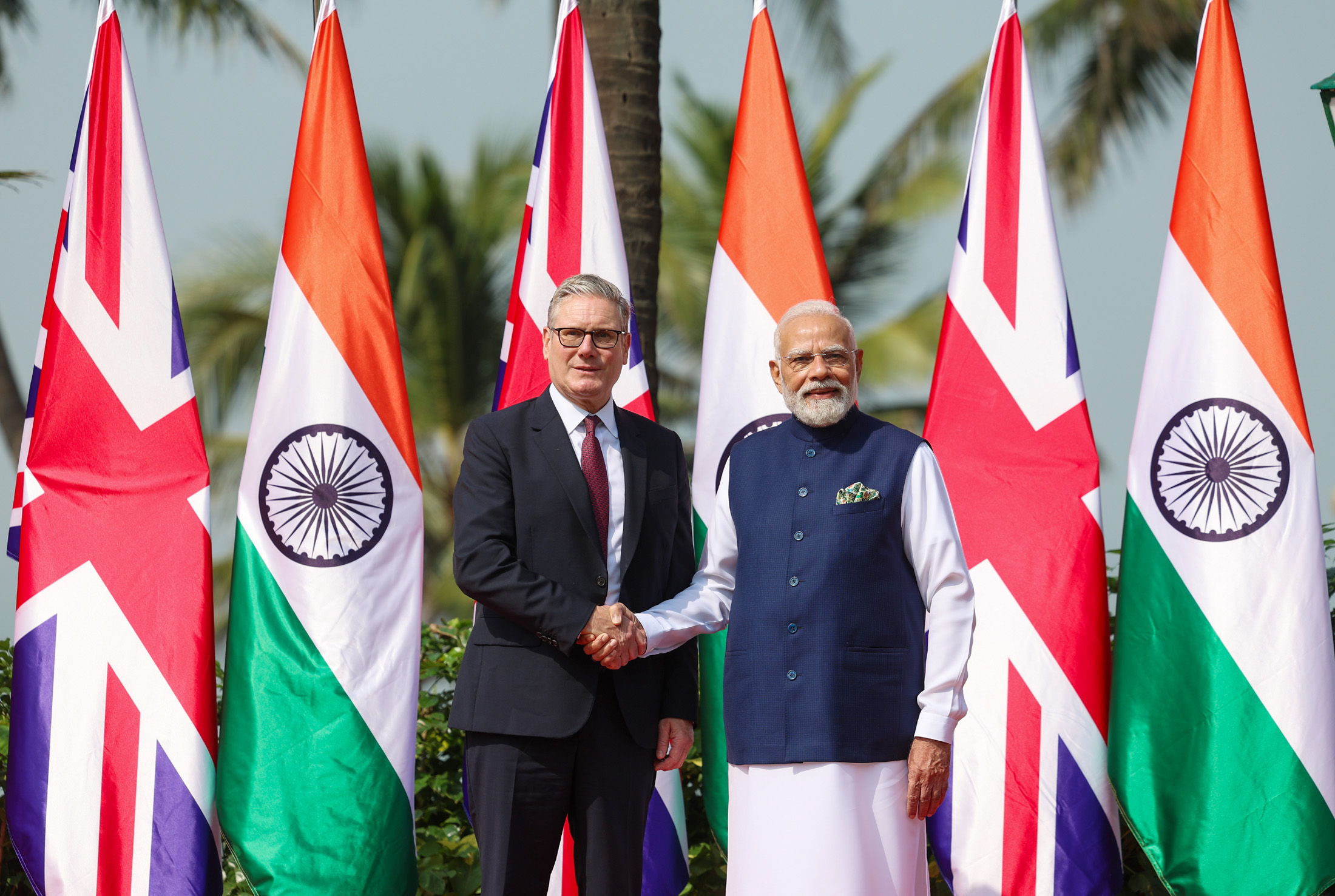
Indian Prime Minister Narendra Modi with British Prime Minister Keir Starmer in Mumbai, October 2025.

India–United Kingdom relations, also known as Indian–British relations or Indo–British relations, are the international relations between the Republic of India and the United Kingdom of Great Britain and Northern Ireland. India has a high commission in London (India House) and consulates-general in Belfast, Birmingham, Edinburgh and in Manchester. The United Kingdom has a high commission in New Delhi and six deputy high commissions in Mumbai, Ahmedabad, Chennai, Bangalore, Hyderabad and Kolkata. Both countries are in the Commonwealth of Nations. The United Kingdom has an Indian diaspora of over 1.5 million.

== History ==
=== Pre history and Early historical references ===
The Anglo-Saxon Chronicle for 883 AD make reference to King Alfred of Wessex sending alms to St Thomas shrine in India.

=== East India Company (1600–1857) ===
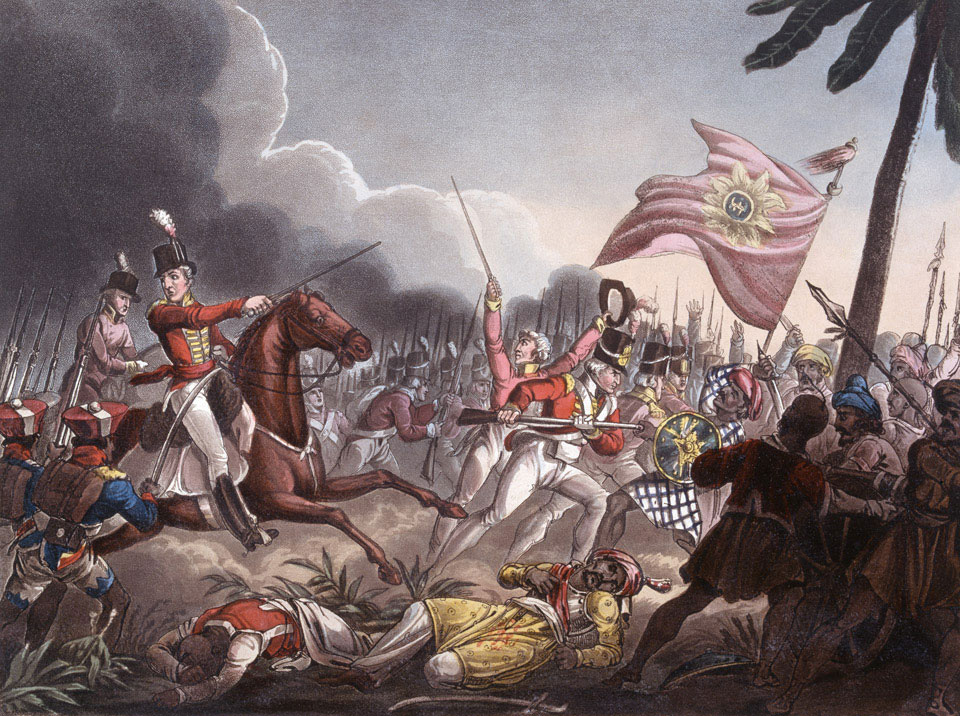
Major General Wellesley commanding his troops at the Battle of Assaye in 1803

Trade was established between Tudor England and Mughal India in 1600 when Elizabeth I granted the newly formed East India Company a royal charter by sending precious gifts to the Mughal court of Emperor Akbar the Great. Sir Thomas Roe and Sir William Hawkins were both separately an envoy to the Mughal Emperor Jahangir, the latter at one point being given a mansabdar.

During the 18th century, the East India Company began to gain greater influence in India. The Battle of Plassey in 1757 led to the conquest of Bengal while by 1857, following various treaties and wars with Indian kingdoms (such as the Anglo-Mysore Wars with Tipu Sultan, the Anglo-Maratha Wars and both the First and Second Anglo-Sikh Wars), the East India Company controlled most of the Indian subcontinent.

=== British Raj (1858–1947) ===
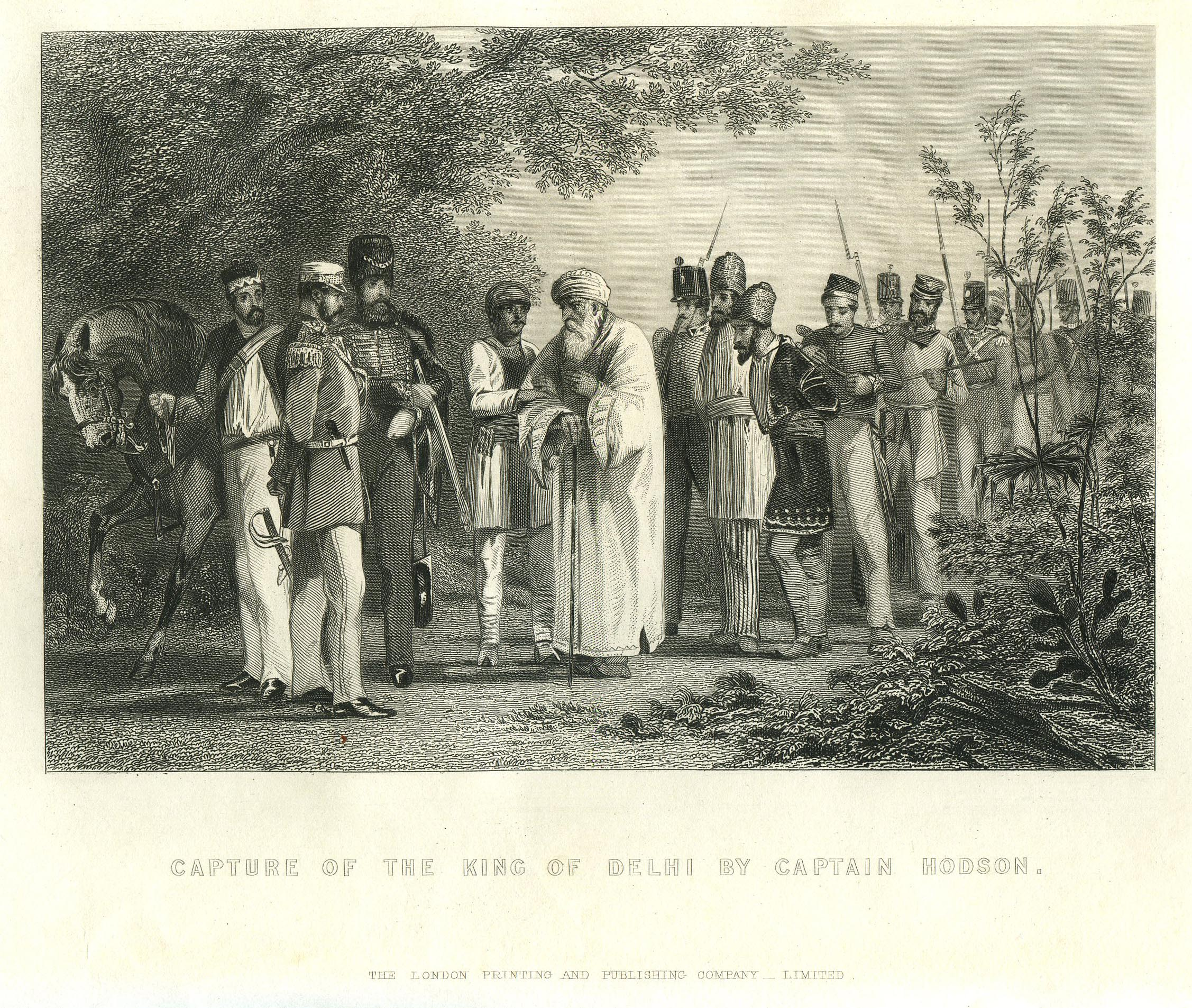
Capture of the last Mughal emperor Bahadur Shah Zafar and his sons by William Hodson in 1857

Following the Indian Rebellion of 1857, where Indian sepoys rebelled against their British officers, the East India Company was dissolved the following year. The assets of the British East India Company became so huge that the British government decided to step in, seizing control of the territories and treaty arrangements of the company. India served as the main base for the British Empire's expansion across Asia and would remain the empire's most important asset and main source of income as well as soldiers until independence. From a small trading outpost, India became an empire within an empire - the jewel in the British crown.

The 1869 completion of the Suez Canal led to significantly faster transport between India and the United Kingdom. In 1876, the area, which included modern India, Pakistan, and Bangladesh, became "the Indian Empire" (often known historically as the "British Raj") with British Monarch Queen Victoria proclaimed as "Empress of India" (a title held by her successors until 1947). The British Indian Army was established and assisted Britain in many wars, including the Anglo-Afghan Wars, the Anglo-Gurkha Wars, the Anglo-Burmese Wars, the First and Second Opium Wars, and both World Wars.

During the British Raj, India faced numerous devastating famines, notably the Great Famine of 1876–1878, which resulted in the deaths of approximately 6.1 to 10.39 million Indians, and the Indian famine of 1899–1900, causing an estimated 1.25 to 10 million fatalities.

=== The end of British rule ===
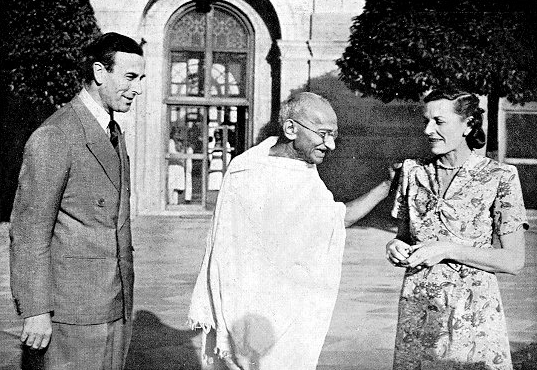
Mahatma Gandhi in 1947, with Lord Louis Mountbatten, Britain's last Viceroy of India

The Indian independence movement gained traction following the Indian Rebellion of 1857. Opposition to British rule increased, where the ideology of satyagraha or non-violence was taken to a height by Gandhi while on another hand, 'self defense' or armed revolution was embraced by Nationalists like by Bhagat Singh and Netaji Subhash Chandra Bose, eventually led to the dissolution of British Raj and Independence of India on 15 August 1947. However, the end of the Raj also resulted in the Partition of India which created two new entities, the Muslim-majority Dominion of Pakistan (which included the eastern province of East Bengal that would later achieve independence as Bangladesh) and the Hindu-majority Dominion of India. Both remained in the Commonwealth of Nations, maintaining informal ties to the former British Empire.

=== Dominion of India (1947–1950) ===
King George VI, who as British Monarch had been "Emperor of India", abandoned this title in 1947, and served as India's ceremonial head of state as 'King of India' (in much the same way, he also served as 'King of Pakistan'). In 1950 India became a republic and the link with the British crown was severed. However, India decided to stay in the Commonwealth; this allowed India to maintain contact with the Indian diaspora, much of which was by then dispersed among the former British colonies.

The Dominion was part of the Sterling Area (the Republic of India finally leaving in 1966).

=== Republic of India (since 1950) ===
Since decolonisation, both Britain and India have pursued quite divergent diplomatic paths.

In particular, India became a major force within the Non-Aligned Movement, which initially sought to avoid taking sides during the Cold War. This contrasted with Britain's position as a founding member of NATO, and key ally of the United States. The death of India's first Prime Minister Jawaharlal Nehru in 1964 also saw the weakening of ties, as Nehru had once remarked himself to be "the last Englishman to rule India".

Between 1947 and 1997, UK and India relations were contentious. India's independent ‘non-aligned’ foreign policy and its close ties with the USSR during the Cold War, had irked Britain. Britain opposed the Indian annexation of Goa from the Portuguese and Sikkim from the Maharajah. It opposed India's nuclear tests and raised the dispute with Pakistan over Kashmir. On its part, India opposed the Anglo-French invasion of Egypt during the Suez Crisis and demanded that the Indian Ocean be declared a Zone of Peace.

==== Post-Cold War ====
The 1990s saw a sea change in the relationship. Britain's relationship with India is “primarily driven by economic considerations rather than political/normative considerations.” The disappearance of the USSR in the 1990s and the economic reforms carried out in India between 1991 and 1996, had cleared the way for better UK-India ties. India's domestic market and its finances to invest abroad had grown exponentially. British prime ministers began to make a beeline to India beginning with John Major's visit to Delhi in 1997. In 2006, UK's Business and Enterprise Committee aimed at establishing a relationship with India “as special as the one with the US.” Major predicted that “within 25 years India will have firmly established herself as one of the world's economic powers”.

Being more eager to build economic relations with India than defend the BBC, then UK foreign minister James Cleverly said: “India is a hugely important partner to the UK and the deeper ties we are forging now, will help to grow the UK economy and boost industries for the future.” He went on to announce that the UK will appoint a ‘Tech Envoy’ to the Indo-Pacific, with a focus on India. Britain has a Tech Envoy for only one other country in the world – the US.

Former prime minister David Cameron described the relationship between the UK and India as "the New Special Relationship". After Brexit, EU nationals working in the health and social care sector were replaced by migrants from non-EU countries such as India. About 250,000 people came from India in 2023. In 2022, Rishi Sunak became the first British Asian to hold the office of prime minister, later also becoming the first British Asian to hold the office of leader of the opposition in 2024.

Through an FTA, the UK aims to double UK-India trade by 2030. Britain and India have already announced a scheme for young professionals, which will give 3,000 Indians and 3,000 Britons a pathway to live and work in each other's countries for up to two years. This partially addresses the Indian complaint that, while UK wants Indian trade and investment, it rejects Indian immigrants/expatriates.

In May 2025, the UK and India agreed a trade deal to make it cheaper and easier to buy and sell goods and services to one another. Incumbent prime minister Keir Starmer described this as the UK's best trade deal since Brexit. Starmer faced questions regarding India's continued purchase of Russian fossil fuels, stating that he respects India's "strategic independence."

== Economy ==
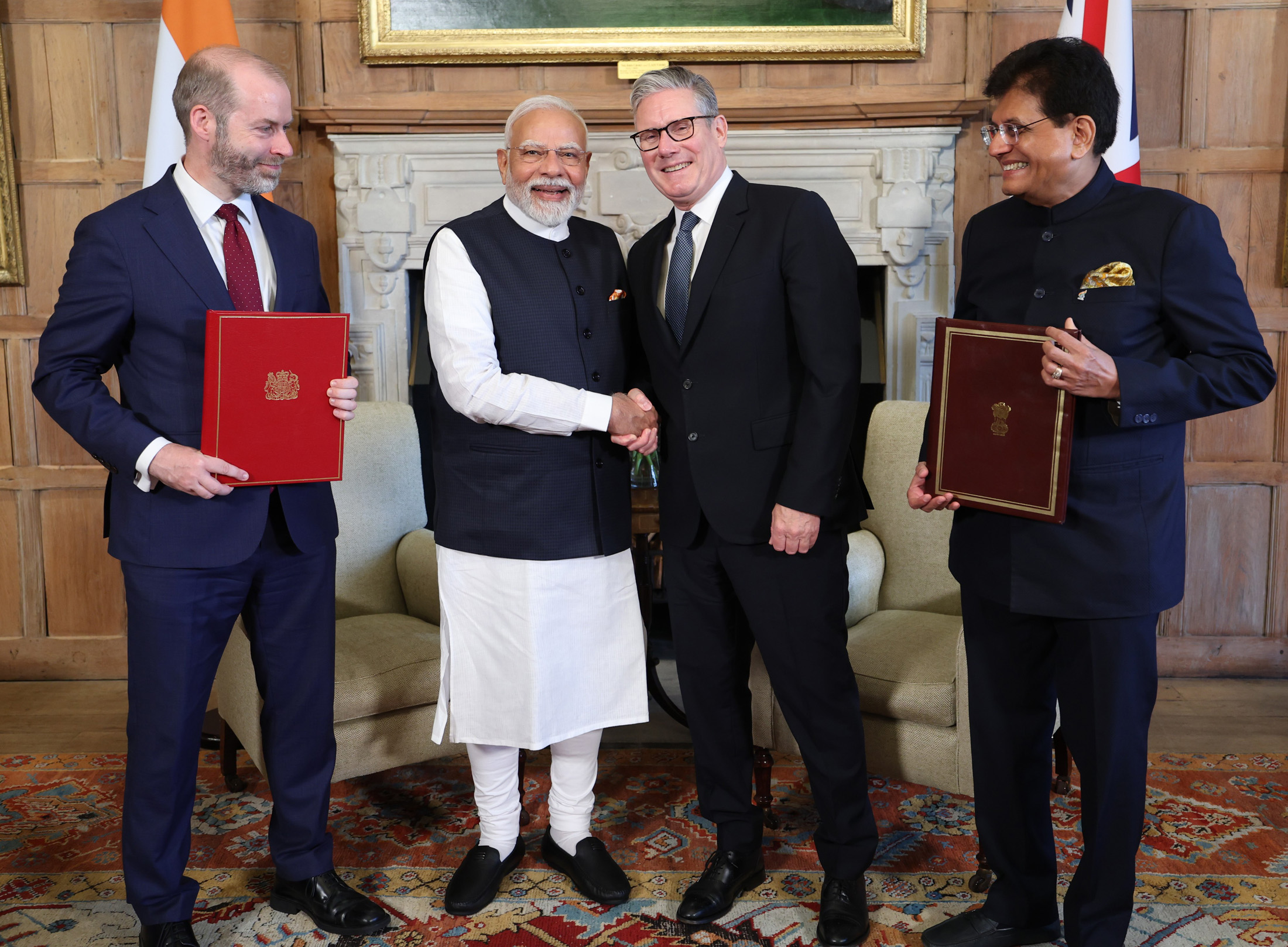
Prime Minister Narendra Modi of India and the Prime Minister Keir Starmer of the United Kingdom, at the exchange ceremony of Comprehensive Economic and Trade Agreement (CETA) at London, in 2025.

India is the second largest foreign investor in the UK. While UK ranks 18th as a trading partner of India and third after Mauritius and Singapore as an investor in India. There are many bilateral trade agreements between the two nations designed to strengthen ties. For example, in 2005, the Joint Economic and Trade Committee (JETCO) was inaugurated in New Delhi aimed at boosting two-way bilateral investments.

The growth of India's multinational companies contributed greatly to UK's business and economy. As of 2019, Indian companies in the UK generated over 48 billion pounds. Also, they have employed more than 105,000 people in the UK. Tata Group alone employed over 63,760 people in the UK. This kind of phenomenon, where non-Western countries impact the West, has been commented on by sociologist Anthony Giddens as "reverse colonialism". At a dinner on 15 August 2017, held to mark 70 years of India's independence, UK Foreign Secretary Boris Johnson said: "We in the UK are the beneficiaries of reverse colonialism." Johnson said the Jaguar car made in Castle Bromwich and exported back to India "in ever growing numbers" incarnated the "commercial role reversal" between India and the UK.

The British government has chosen India as one of its most influential trade partners because it is one of the "fastest growing economies in the world." In 2013, Cameron formed the biggest trade delegation by accommodating more than 100 representatives that varied from multinational corporations, medium-to-small-sized corporations, and universities to India. Compared to the 2010 trade mission, the UK and India negotiated to double the trade volume by 2015. Following the trade delegation, total UK goods and services exports to India increased by 14% from January to September 2013. Between 6 and 8 November 2016, then British PM Theresa May visited India for a bilateral trip. The key topic of discussions would be May's plan for post-Brexit relations with India. Discussion on a possible free-trade agreement is also in the agenda. According to a MEA (Ministry of External Affairs, India) spokesperson, there is "substantial scope for further strengthening bilateral cooperation across a range of sectors, including science & technology, finance, trade & investment, and defense & security."

Following a meeting between Finance Minister Arun Jaitley and Chancellor of the Exchequer Philip Hammond at the 9th UK-India economic and financial dialogue, Jaitley announced that the two countries had agreed to discuss a bilateral free trade agreement. However, Jaitley stated that a formal dialogue on the agreement would only begin post-Brexit.

In September 2017 the High Commission of India in the UK, with the support of the UK India Business Council, announced the Access India programme, a unique scheme set up to help many more UK SMEs export to India. Whilst many large UK companies have a presence in India, small and medium-sized British companies do not. India hopes that the Access to India programme will not only encourage British SMEs to export to India but also inspire them to manufacture in India fulfilling the aims of the Make in India initiative.

The UK and India have remained close bilaterally, historically and on an ever-expanding basis. In January 2022, the two countries opened negotiations for a Free Trade Agreement. The countries concluded negotiations for an agreement in principle on 6 May 2025.

In July 2025, India and the United Kingdom signed the India–United Kingdom Comprehensive Economic and Trade Agreement during Prime Minister Narendra Modi's visit to London. The deal aims to double bilateral trade to US$120 billion by 2030 by eliminating tariffs on key goods such as Indian textiles and British automobiles and whisky. The agreement also covers services, innovation, government procurement, and intellectual property rights. Additionally, both countries concluded a Double Contribution Convention Agreement, easing social security obligations for Indian professionals in the UK. This marks a major step forward in strengthening economic and strategic ties between the two democracies. It is expected that the agreement will create 7000 jobs in the UK and increase the UK's GDP by £4.8 billion annually.

== Political ==
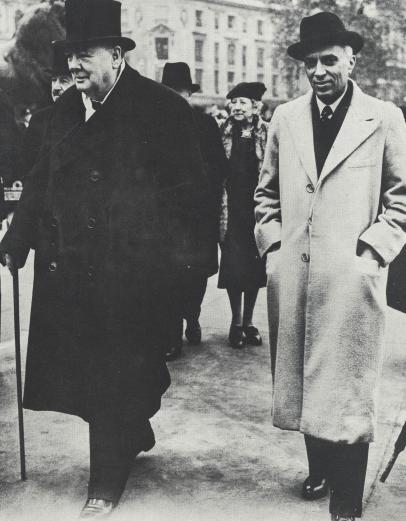
Jawaharlal Nehru with Winston Churchill, London, October 1948

Politically, relations between India and the UK occur mostly through the multilateral organisations of which both are members, such as the Commonwealth of Nations, the World Trade Organization and the Asian Development Bank.

After India became a republic, Queen Elizabeth II visited three times, in 1961, 1983 and 1997. Elizabeth II of the United Kingdom paid state visits to India in November 1963, April 1990, and in October 1997.

Three Presidents of India have paid state visits to the United Kingdom: Sarvepalli Radhakrishnan in June 1963, Ramaswamy Venkataraman in October 1990, and Pratibha Patil in 2009. Prime Minister Manmohan Singh visited the UK in 2006.

After becoming the Prime Minister of the United Kingdom, Cameron was actively involved in enhancing the Indian-British relationship on various dimensions, such as "business, energy security, climate change, education, research, security and defense, and international relations." His effort could be seen in his political visits in India on 18–20 February 2013 and on 14 November 2013. Following his visit, other politicians such as Former UK Foreign Secretary William Hague and the then Chancellor of the Exchequer George Osborne visited India to accomplish a trade mission in July 2014. During their visit, Osborne announced that a statue of Gandhi would be erected in London's Parliament Square to commemorate the 100th anniversary of Gandhi's return to India from South Africa. Upon unveiling the statue on 14 March 2015, Cameron stated that "Our ties with India have remained close throughout history and continue to go from strength to strength – through mutual respect as equals, through cooperation, trade, and of course through the one-and-a-half million Indian diasporas living in Britain today who bring our two nations closer, to the benefit of both." He further commented that the statue will "enrich the firm bond of friendship between the world's oldest democracy and its largest."

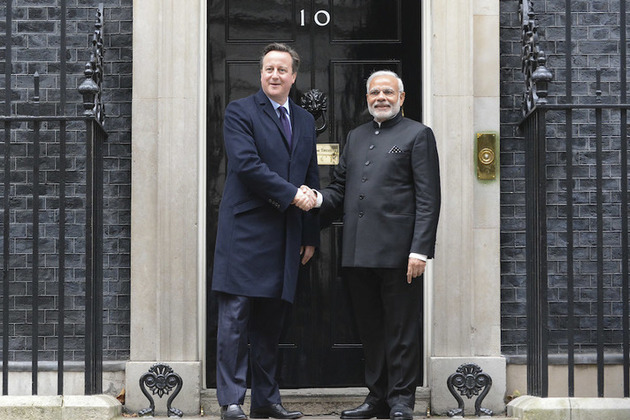
David Cameron welcomes Indian Prime Minister Narendra Modi to Downing Street for bilateral talks, 12 November 2015

In terms of political forces behind economic development, Western powers look to India as a case study contrasting democracy-led growth and state-guided growth, the latter of which has been the modus operandi for China.

Prime Minister Narendra Modi visited the UK from 12 to 16 November 2015. During the visit, Modi became the first Indian Prime Minister to address the British Parliament. The Times of India reported that agents from Mossad and MI5 were protecting Prime Minister Narendra Modi who was heading to the 2015 G-20 Summit in Antalya, Turkey. The paper reported that the agents had been called in to provide additional cover to Modi's security detail, composed of India's Special Protection Group and secret agents from RAW and IB, in wake of the November 2015 Paris attacks.

Prime Minister Theresa May visited India on 6 November 2016 in her first bilateral visit to a non-European country since becoming prime minister. Explaining the decision, May said, "It [the visit] matters now more than ever. India is the fastest-growing major economy." May had previously referred to India as a "key strategic partner" in the aftermath of Britain voting to leave the European Union. She was accompanied by Trade Secretary Liam Fox and a delegation of 33 business leaders aiming to boost trade and investment between India and the United Kingdom.

At a dinner held to mark 70 years of Indian independence and 70 years of the Indian Journalists' Association on 15 August 2017, UK Foreign Secretary Boris Johnson said: "We in the UK are the beneficiaries of reverse colonialism." He gave as an example the Jaguar car made in Castle Bromwich and exported back to India, as well as the Hawk jets which are made by BAE Systems and Hindustan Aeronautics Limited. Of the Jaguar, he said the car incarnated "the commercial role reversal" between India and the UK.

At the same dinner then UK Foreign Secretary Boris Johnson said that the UK was working "ever more closely" with India to bring peace and stability to the Asia Pacific region, that the UK was increasingly co-operating in intelligence sharing with India and had no hesitation in sharing advanced technologies with India.

In 2017 Times of India reported Boris Johnson as saying that in the first half of the year Britain gave nearly 500,000 visas to Indians – an eight per cent rise on the previous year. "Britain issues more visas to Indians than any other country in the world, apart from China." Mr Johnson said.

Following a resolution passed by the Labour Party, which attempted to internationalise the Kashmir issue in September 2019, the Indian High Commission in London decided to boycott the party and its events, whilst attending events organised by the Conservative Party-affiliated Conservative Friends of India. The Labour Party was historically the party of choice for many British Indians, but has lost support to the Conservatives in recent elections.

Prime Minister Boris Johnson accepted the invitation to India's Republic Day in 2021, however, he later cancelled his itinerary due to COVID-19 pandemic in the United Kingdom. Boris Johnson had also visited Ahmedabad, Gujarat in India in April 2022.

At the International Atomic Energy Agency’s general conference in 2022, India backed AUKUS although it was opposed by Russia and China, and Indian delegates thwart Chinese related proposal.

The UK government commits to support India's permanent membership of United Nations Security Council.

India lodged a formal protest with the British High Commission in New Delhi after a so-called Khalistan separatist sympathizer pulled down the Indian national flag outside its embassy in London, during the Punjab local police tried to capture a Sikh separatist leader Amritpal Singh.

The United Kingdom strongly condemned the 22 April 2025 Pahalgam terror attack, with Prime Minister Keir Starmer personally calling Prime Minister Modi to express condolences and solidarity with the people of India. The UK government described the attack as “devastating,” supported the UN Security Council statement condemning terrorism as “criminal and unjustifiable,” and emphasized its commitment to stand “shoulder to shoulder” with India during this difficult time.

== Military relations ==
A defence partnership exists between Britain and India.

=== Navy ===
Throughout history, India had mainly faced threats of land-based invasion through its northwest, which meant that it did not have a naval focus in the Indian Ocean until the colonial era, when the British rulers took steps to guard the maritime routes to India through Egypt and the Strait of Malacca. In the first few decades of India's independence, the Indian Navy was still dependent on the United Kingdom for training and support. However, lack of Western support during the Cold War then pushed India toward the Soviet Union for help in building its navy.

== Education ==
Various Indian students have gone to the UK to attain higher levels of education. From 2004 to 2009, the number of Indian students studying in the UK doubled from 10,000 to over 20,000. By 2009, India was one of the top ten countries sending students to study in the UK.

During the 2010 UK-India Summit, the Prime Minister of the United Kingdom and India came into agreement to support education by implementing the India Education and Research Initiative (UKIERI). In this summit, Cameron stated that "Education is an area where India and the UK could pool some of the advantages for mutual benefit." He continued by stating that a higher quality of education would lead to providing opportunities for all, thus encouraging economic growth and overcoming poverty in India. However, after its implementation, the number of Indian students studying in the UK did not increase as expected by both governments.

In 2010, the then Home Secretary Theresa May announced a stricter immigration law. This included tighter rules for international students. Students were forced to return to their homeland after earning their degrees. Since the immigration law, there has been a rapid decrease of 25% in the number of first year students from India during the year 2012–2013.

Theresa May's action has been criticised by people such as historian Edward Acton. Acton stated that this action is "butchering" the Anglo-Indian friendship because it is "treating university students as immigrants." The continuous drop in the number of international students, including Indians, has become controversial. Business leaders such as Sir James Dyson have commented that forcing international students to move back to their homeland can be detrimental to the British economy in the long term.

In March 2015, Phillip Hammond stated during an interview with DD News that Theresa May's policy has been cancelled. Starting in 2015, Indian students are able to stay in the UK for six months after their graduation.

Boris Johnson told Times of India in 2017 that "the number of Indian students in the UK continues to rise. Our most recent figures show a 10% increase in Indian students gaining visas – and 91% of these applications are successful. We want the brightest and best Indian students to attend our great universities; there is no limit to the number of genuine Indian students who can study in Britain," he said in the interview.

== Cultural relations ==
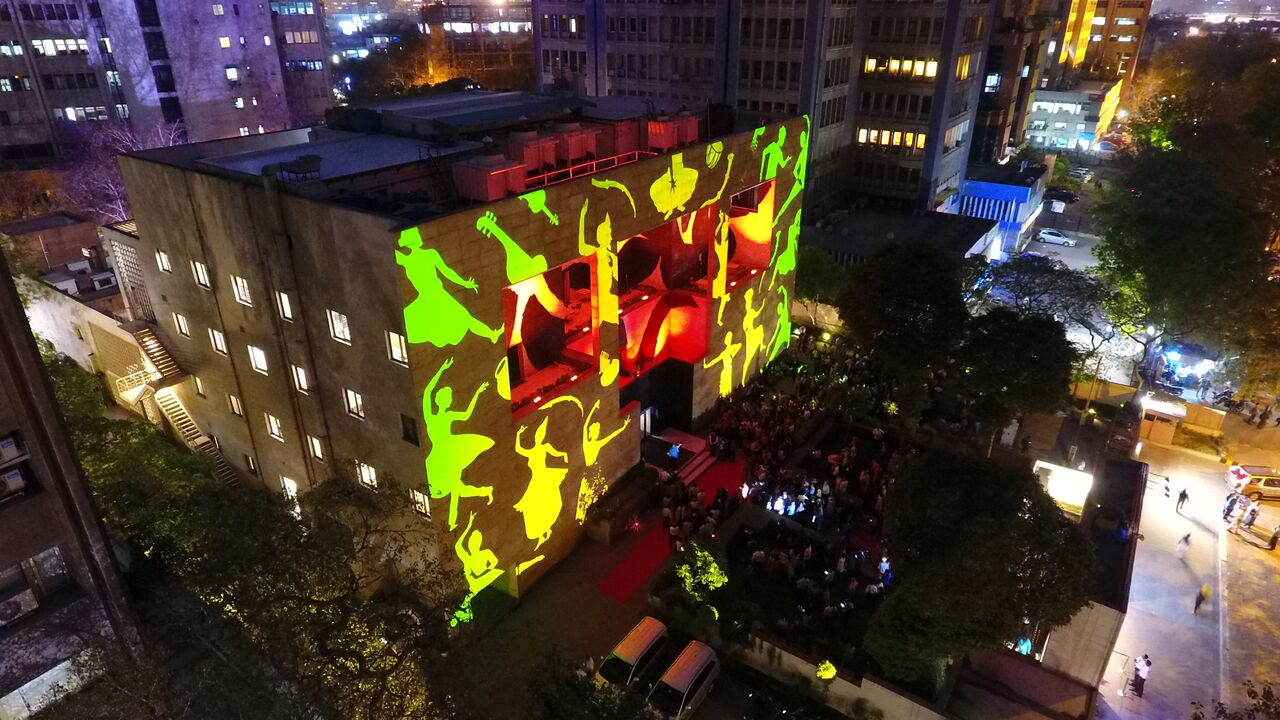
British Council Delhi Launch of Mix The City Delhi, 6 April 2017

=== Cultural history ===
British archaeologists and cultural enthusiasts played a significant role during the colonial era in rediscovering and publicising some of India's pre-Islamic heritage, which had begun to disappear during the Indo-Muslim period, as well as preserving some of the Mughal monuments.

==== 2017 UK-India Year of Culture ====
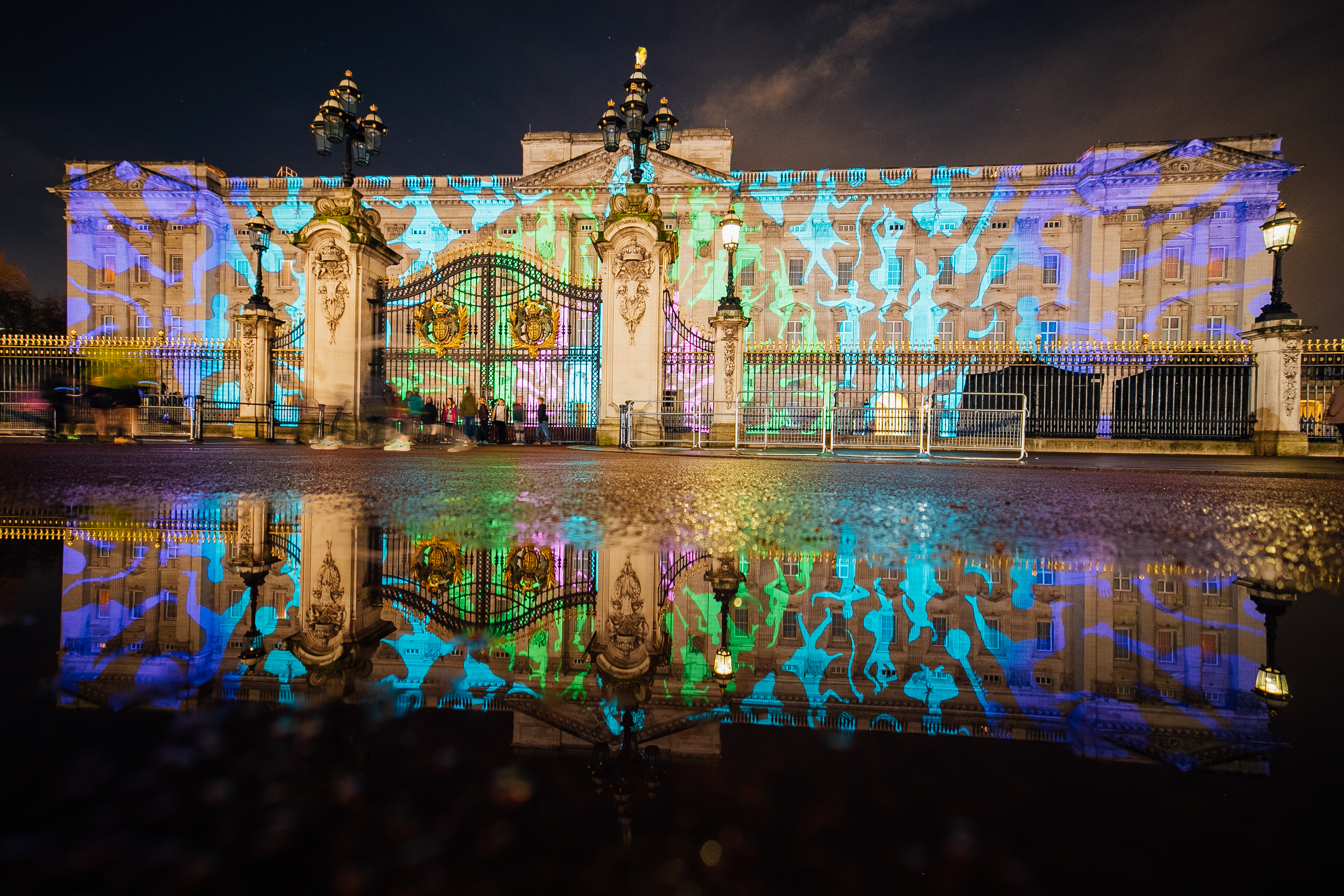
UK-India Year of Culture official launch

Queen Elizabeth II hosted the official launch of the UK India Year of Culture on 27 February 2017 at Buckingham Palace with Indian Finance Minister Arun Jaitley representing Prime Minister Narendra Modi. The British Council worked with the Palace and British-Indian start-up Studio Carrom to project a peacock, India's national bird, onto the facade of Buckingham Palace.

The programme for the year was announced by UK Minister of State for Digital and Culture Rt Hon Matt Hancock, Indian High Commissioner to the United Kingdom HE Mr Sinha and British Council Deputy Chair Rt Hon Baroness Prashar CBE PC, at the British Film Institute on 28 February 2017. The programme includes an exhibition from the British Museum and The Chhatrapati Shivaji Maharaj Vastu Sangrahalaya in Mumbai, the first exhibition on Indian innovation at the UK's Science Museum, London, and the restoration of 1928 Indian movie, Shiraz, by the British Film Institute with a new score by British-Indian musician Anoushka Shankar.

The British Council inaugurated the Year of Culture in India on 6 April 2017 projecting elements of the Buckingham Palace Studio Carrom peacock onto the British Council's Delhi building and launching an interactive music app Mix the City Delhi.

=== Religion ===
Christianity began to be perceived negatively by many Indians during British rule, as it was seen as part of the imperialist project. However, aspects of Christianity, such as its emphasis on monotheism, influenced Hindu beliefs. Christian pacifism also found indirect expression in the Indian independence movement, with Gandhi having held an appreciation of Jesus and certain passages from the Bible.

=== Sport ===
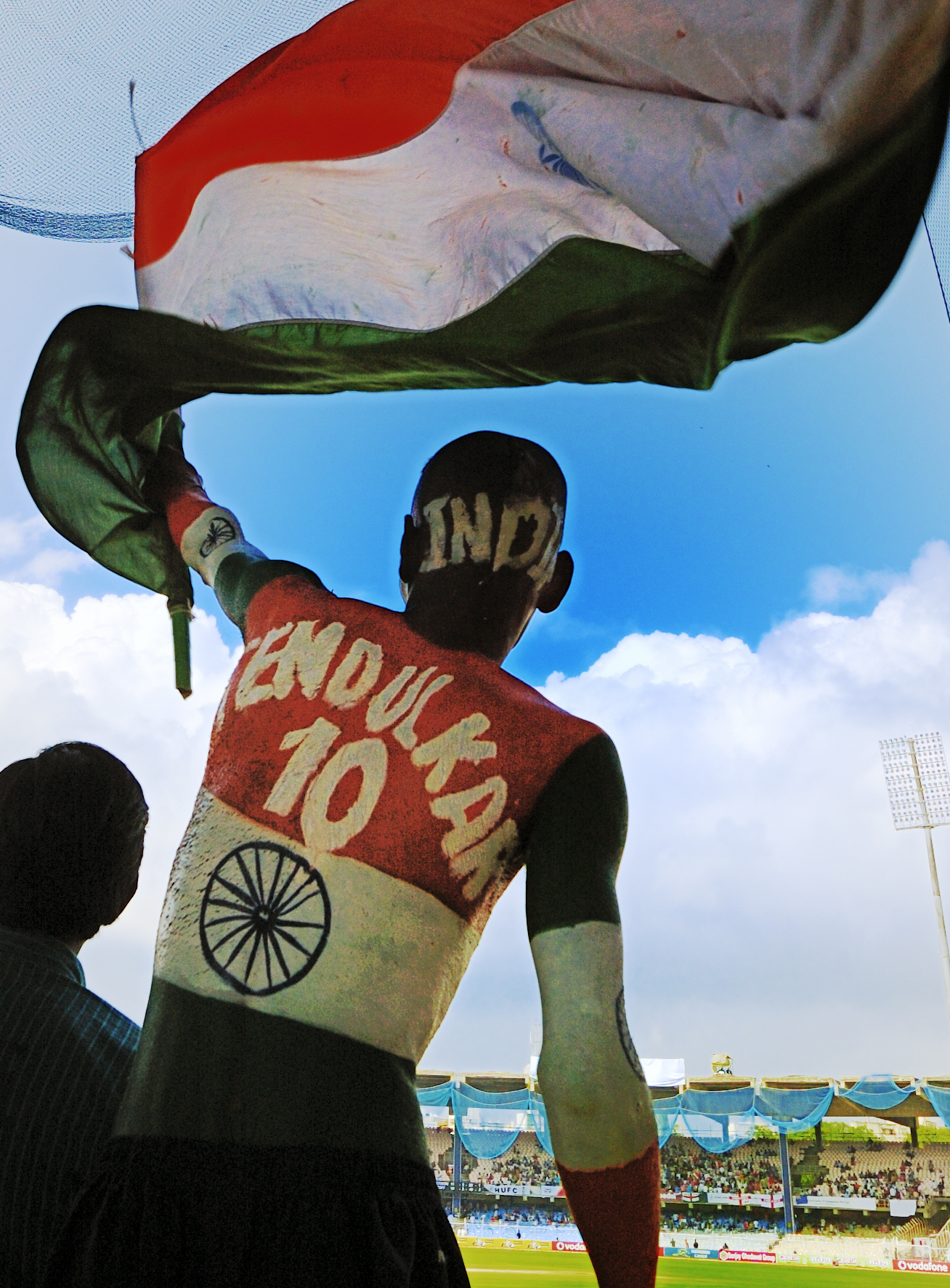
A supporter of the Indian cricket team at a match. Cricket, a British-origin sport, has been described as a major unifying force in South Asia.

British sports (particularly hockey early on, but then largely replaced by cricket in recent decades, with football also popular in certain regions of the subcontinent) were cemented as part of South Asian culture during the British Raj, with the local games having been overtaken in popularity but also standardised by British influences. The cricket rivalry between the two countries was historically fierce due to the reaction to colonialism. Elements of Indian physical culture, such as Indian clubs, also made their way to the United Kingdom.

In the modern day, many British cricketers participate in the Indian Premier League. Some Indian sports such as kabaddi and kho kho also have a minor presence in the United Kingdom due to the Indian diaspora.

== See also ==
- List of high commissioners of India to the United Kingdom
- Cayman Islands–India relations
- Foreign relations of India
- Foreign relations of the United Kingdom
- India–European Union relations
- India–United Kingdom bus routes
- India–United Kingdom Comprehensive Economic and Trade Agreement
- Anglo-Indians
- British Indians
