= Margaret Meyer =

British mathematical-astronomer

Margaret Theodora Meyer
- Born: September 1862; Strabane, County Tyrone, Ireland
- Died: 27 January 1924 (aged 61); London
- Known for: Mathematical astronomy

Margaret Theodora Meyer FRAS (September 1862 – 27 January 1924), also known as Maud Meyer was a British mathematician. She was one of the first directors of studies in mathematics, and one of the earliest members of the London Mathematical Society. In 1916, she was one of the first women to be elected a fellow of the Royal Astronomical Society.

== Biography ==
Meyer was born in Strabane, Tyrone, Ireland, to a Presbyterian minister, Theodore Jonas Meyer, and his wife Jane Ann. She had an older brother, Sir William Stevenson Meyer, who served as first high commissioner for India. Meyer spent much of her childhood in Italy. She attended the North London Collegiate School for Girls, then enrolled at Girton College, Cambridge in 1879, graduating 15th wrangler in mathematics 1882. In 1907, she was awarded an ad eundem MA by Trinity College Dublin.

She taught at Notting Hill High School, in London, from 1882 to 1888, and then became a resident lecturer in mathematics at Girton College, where she remained for 30 years. During World War I, Meyer undertook calculational work for the British War Office in her spare time. In 1918 she resigned from work at the college and worked for the British Air Ministry, which related to aircraft design and construction.

Meyer had an interest in astronomy, as part of her degree concerned mathematical astronomy. She carried out much unpublished work on the subject. In 1916, she was one of the first women to be elected to the Royal Astronomical Society along with A. Grace Cook, Fiammetta Wilson, Ella Church, Mary Blagg and Irene Elizabeth Toye Warner.

== Other activities ==
Meyer carved, and supervised students in the carving, of the oak paneling around the chancel of the college chapel at Girton College. She also had a passion for mountain climbing, and was a member and later president of the Ladies' Alpine Club (1916-1919). She regularly visited the Alps to pursue her mountaineering interests; her final visit was during the 1923, only a few months before her death.

== Death ==
Meyer died, aged 61, in a collision with a bus, in Paddington, while cycling in 1924. In her will, she bequeathed £2000 to Girton College for the benefit of women mathematics students, an additional £1000, and a collection of mathematics books.
