= Jaimini Bhagwati =

Indian civil servant and diplomat

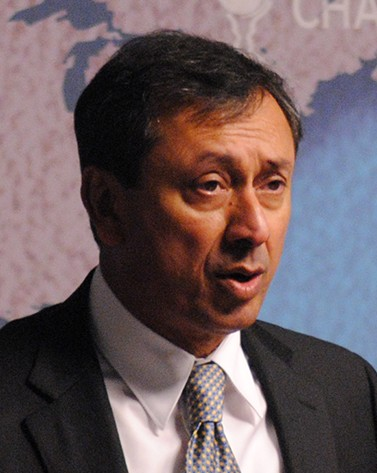

High Commission of India to the United Kingdom
- In office 2012–2013
- Preceded by: Nalin Surie
- Succeeded by: Ranjan Mathai

Personal details
- Occupation: Civil servant, Diplomat

Jaimini Bhagwati is an Indian author, columnist and former Indian Foreign Service officer who served as the High Commissioner of India to the United Kingdom.

He was the RBI Chair Professor at the Indian Council for Research on International Economic Relations, New Delhi. He is currently the Distinguished Fellow at Centre for Social and Economic Progress, a public policy think tank based in New Delhi.

== Early life and education ==
Bhagawati was born to freedom fighter and former union union minister Bijoy Chandra Bhagavati. He studied physics at the St. Stephen's College and later completed a master's degree at the Massachusetts Institute of Technology. He also completed his PhD from Tufts University.

== Positions held ==
- Ambassador to Belgium, Luxembourg and the European Union 2008-2012.

== Diplomatic career ==
He is a 1976 batch officer of the Indian Foreign Service.
