= Shiv Shankar Mukherjee =

Indian civil servant

High Commissioner of India to the United Kingdom
- In office 2008–2009
- Preceded by: Kamalesh Sharma
- Succeeded by: Nalin Surie

Personal details
- Education: Delhi University
- Occupation: Civil servant IFS

Shiv Shankar Mukherjee is an Indian civil servant and was the High Commissioner of India to the United Kingdom from 2008 to 2009.

He is a 1971 batch officer of the Indian Foreign Service. Before he held the position in the United Kingdom he served as ambassador to Nepal from 2004. Other prior appointments include work as High Commissioner to South Africa, as ambassador to Egypt and as High Commissioner to Namibia.
