= Gladys Chatterjee =

Teacher and barrister

Gladys Chatterjee, Lady Chatterjee OBE
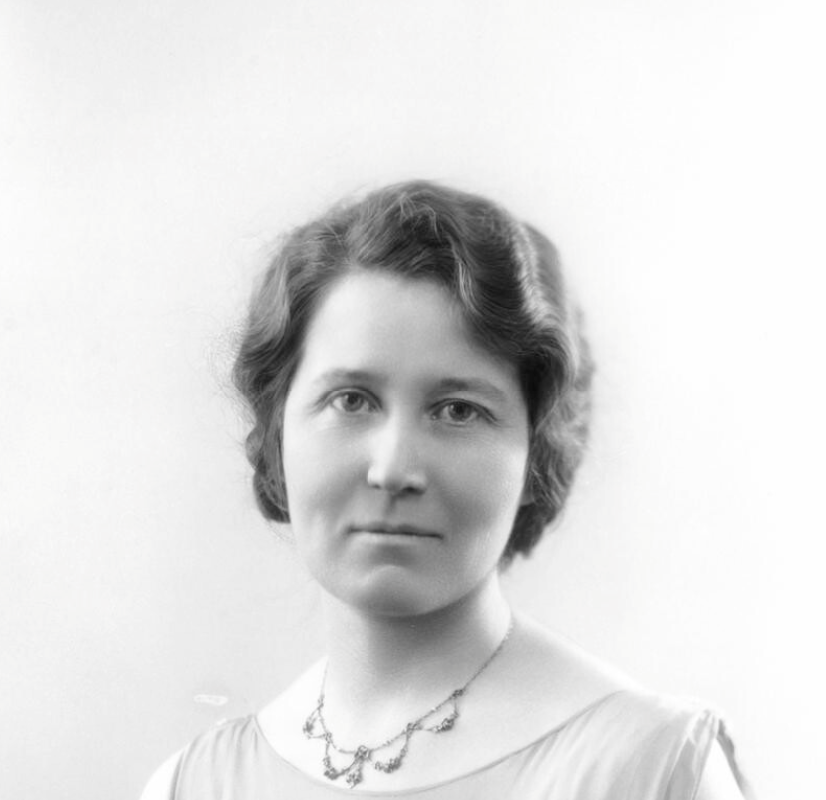
- in 1925 by Bassano Ltd
- Born: Gladys Mary Broughton; 30 October 1883; Ujjain, Gwalior State, British Raj (now in Madhya Pradesh)
- Died: 7 May 1969 (aged 85); Bramley, Surrey, England
- Known for: war work and barrister
- Spouse: Sir Atul Chandra Chatterjee

Gladys Mary Chatterjee, Lady Chatterjee OBE (née Broughton; 30 October 1883 – 7 May 1969) was a British teacher, schools inspector, and barrister, and the wife of Sir Atul Chandra Chatterjee.

== Life ==
She was born in 1883. Her parents were Emily Angelina (born Filose) and Captain William Barnard Broughton. Her maternal grandfather, Sir Michael Filose, had designed Jai Vilas Mahal (known as the Gwalior palace). Her father died while she was a child and her mother remarried Lt Colonel Ernest Frederick Cambier.

She went to Bedford High School and she attended University College London where she enjoyed several scholarships as she gained a degree in philosophy. She gained a qualification to teach at Bedford College, London, but went to work at the Board of Trade as an investigator in 1912. In 1913 she went to India to work as an inspector of schools and returned during the war in 1916 to become a welfare officer in the Ministry of Munitions. For this work she earned one of the first OBE's as an "organiser of women’s welfare in national shell and national projectile factories".

She then took a doctorate at the London School of Economics in Women and Children in Indian Industry.

She married in 1924 and as a result she became Lady Chatterjee when her husband was knighted as he became the high commissioner for India in 1925. She was able to practise as a barrister after she was called to the Bar at Lincoln’s Inn in 1933.

== Personal life ==
On 30 April 1924 she married Sir Atul Chandra Chatterjee who was a member of the viceroy’s executive council, while she was working for the Indian Educational Service. She was his second wife and he had a surviving daughter from his first marriage to Vina Mookerjee. After Indian independence, they emigrated to the UK, settling in Kensington in London, where her husband died in 1955. Subsequently Lady Chatterjee presented his books to the Centre of South Asian Studies, University of Cambridge.
