= Nalin Surie =

Indian civil servant

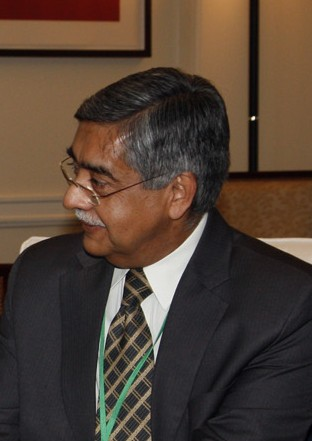

High Commission of India to the United Kingdom
- In office 2009–2011
- Preceded by: Shiv Shankar Mukherjee
- Succeeded by: Jaimini Bhagwati

Personal details
- Occupation: Civil servant IFS

Nalin Surie was an Indian Civil servant and was the Indian ambassador to United Kingdom.

== Positions held ==
- Ambassador to China.
- Head of Indian Council of World Affairs.
- MEA secretary (west).

== Indian Foreign Service ==
He is a 1973 batch officer of the Indian Foreign Service.
