= Atul Chandra Chatterjee =

Indian diplomat and government official

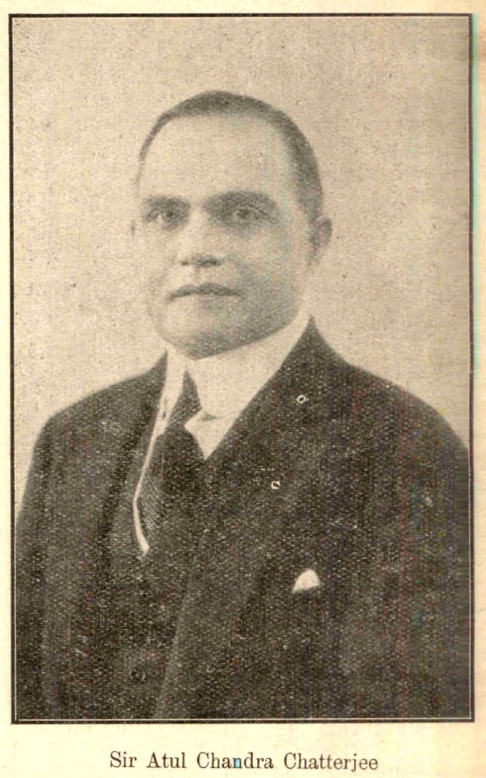

Sir Atul Chandra Chatterjee GCIE KCSI (Bengali: অতুল চন্দ্র চ্যাটার্জী; 24 November 1874 – 8 September 1955) was an Indian diplomat and government official who served as the Indian High Commissioner to the United Kingdom from 1925 to 1931 and was member of the governing body of the League of Nations Assembly in 1925 and 1946. He is known for proposing the India House in London in 1925, which was designed by Sir Herbert Baker and completed in 1930.

== Early life and education ==
He was born in Calcutta (now Kolkata) to Hem Chandra Chatterjee and Nistarini Devi.

Chatterjee was educated at Presidency College in Kolkata and then at King's College at Cambridge University, where he graduated in 1896 with an honours degree. In 1896, he stood for the Indian Civil Service examinations, passing first.

== Career ==
From 1897 to 1906, Chatterjee served as an ICS official in the United Provinces, eventually rising to the office of District collector, after which he spent some time as an industries official in the government of the United Provinces. He represented India at the International Labour Conference in Washington in 1919, and then at Geneva in 1921 and from 1924 to 1933. He succeeded Sir Dadiba Merwanji Dalal as High Commissioner for India in 1925 and served until 1931. In 1927 he served as the President of the International Labour Conference. From 1926 to 1931 he was a member of the governing board of the International Labour Organization, and was elected its Vice-President in 1932 and its President in 1933.

Chatterjee was an Indian delegate to the London Naval Conference 1930, and led the Indian delegation at the Ottawa Imperial Conference in 1932. From 1921 to 1924, he was the Industries Member on the Viceroy's Executive Council, and served as the High Commissioner to the UK from 1925 to 1931, after which he served on the Council of India until 1936. From 1938 to 1946, he served as Chairman of the Permanent Central Opium Board of the League of Nations, also serving as an adviser to the Secretary of State for India from 1942 to 1947.

For his services, Sir Atul was appointed a CIE in the 1919 Birthday Honours list and knighted with the KCIE in the 1925 New Year Honours list., He was appointed a Knight Commander of the Order of the Star of India (KCSI) on 8 July 1930, and was appointed a Knight Grand Commander of the Order of the Indian Empire (GCIE) in the New Year Honours of 1933.

== Personal life ==
Chatterjee first married Vina Mookerjee and had two daughters, Reva Violet Chatterjee (1901–1977) and Vera Chatterjee (died in the post-First World War flu epidemic). Vina died young soon after Vera's birth.

In 1924, he married Dr. Gladys Broughton, OBE, sometime labour adviser to the Government of India, who was a barrister and served with the Indian Educational Service. After Indian independence, Chatterjee emigrated to the UK, settling in Kensington in London, where he died aged 80 in 1955. Subsequently Lady Chatterjee presented his books to the Centre of South Asian Studies, University of Cambridge.

== Works ==
- Notes on the Industries of the United Provinces. (1908), Nabu Press, 2010. ISBN 1-141-35819-0.
- British contributions to Indian studies, with Sir Richard Burn, British Council. Pub. for the British Council by Longmans, Green, 1943.
- A short history of India, with W. H. Moreland. Longmans, Green and co., 1944.
- The New India . Allen and Unwin, London. 1948.

== Footnotes ==
Diplomatic posts
Preceded by Dadiba Merwanji Dalal	High Commissioner for India; 1925 - 1931	Succeeded by Bhupendra Nath Mitra
