= S. E. Runganadhan =

Indian educationalist and diplomat (1877–1966)

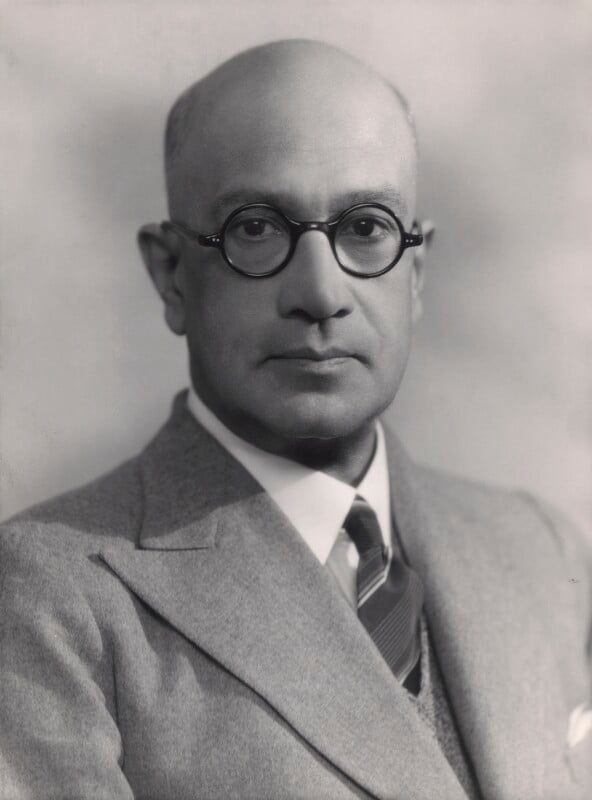
Runganadhan in 1940

Dewan Bahadur Sir Samuel Ebenezer Runganadhan (also Ranganathan; 30 December 1877 – 7 November 1966) was an Indian educationist who served successively as Vice-Chancellor of Annamalai University and Madras University and as the final permanent High Commissioner for India under the British Empire from 1943 to 1947.

== Life ==
Runganadhan was born to Reverend C. Runganadhan of the London Missionary Society. In 1908, he entered the Madras Provincial Educational Service. Later he was promoted to the Indian Educational Service in 1921, which had hitherto been mainly reserved for British educationists. He married Leila Rau, daughter of K. Krishna Rau of Madras, and had a son and a daughter. From 1929 to 1935, he served as Vice-Chancellor of Annamalai University. He was a delegate to the Congress of the Universities of the Empire, held in Edinburgh in 1931. Subsequently, he was appointed the Vice-Chancellor of University of Madras from 1937 to 1940. He was president of the Indian Christian Association of Madras and vice-president of the All-India Christian Conference. In 1938, he was elected a member of the Legislative Council of the Madras Presidency, serving until 1940, when he became the adviser to the Secretary of State for India. From 1938–1939, he was the Chairman of the Inter-Universities Board of India.

Conferred the title of Dewan Bahadur in 1937, Runganadhan was knighted in the 1943 New Year Honours list and appointed the last High Commissioner for India in May 1943. During his tenure as High Commissioner, he raised £40,000 to aid victims of the Bengal Famine. He was a delegate to the Conference of the Institute of Pacific Relations in December 1942, and the leader of the Indian delegations to the 1945 International Labour Conference (Paris), the 1946 Conference (Montreal) and to the Paris Peace Conference in 1946, signing the peace treaties on behalf of India. He retired as High Commissioner in April 1947, shortly before Indian independence, and died in Bangalore, aged 88.

Diplomatic posts
Preceded by Azizul Haque	High Commissioner for India; 1943 - 1947	Succeeded by M. K. Vellodi (acting)
