= India House, London =

Diplomatic mission of India to the United Kingdom

Coordinates: 51.5124°N 0.1183°W

High Commission of India in London
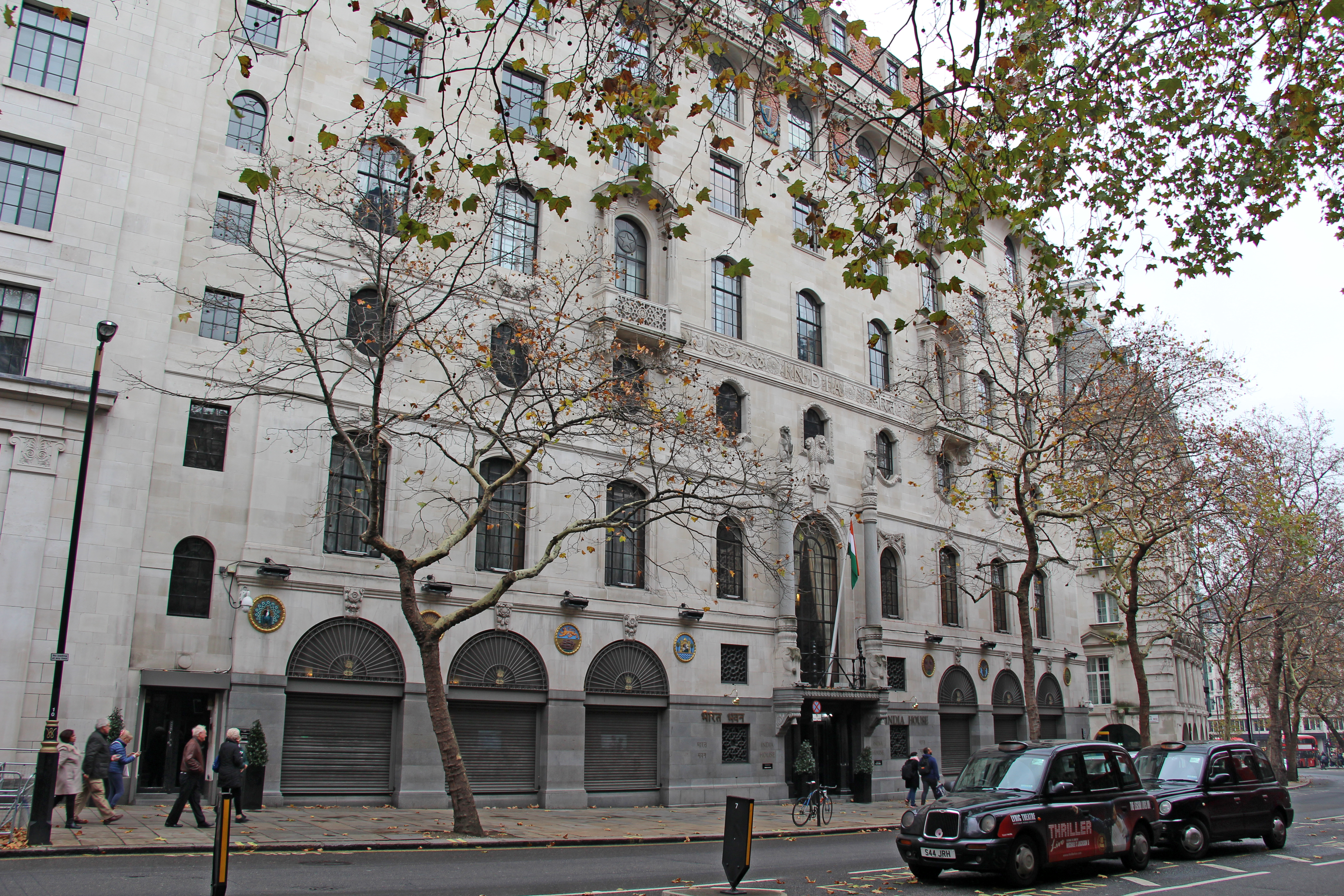
- Address: India House, Aldwych, London, United Kingdom
- Jurisdiction: United Kingdom
- High Commissioner: Periasamy Kumaran, IFS
- Website: Official website

Listed Building – Grade II
- Official name: India House
- Designated: 16 January 1981
- Reference no.: 1066491

The High Commission of India in London, England, is the diplomatic mission of India in the United Kingdom. It is located in India House on Aldwych, between Bush House, Marconi House (now Citibank) and Australia House. It faces both the London School of Economics and King's College London. Since 1981, India House is a Grade II listed building.

== History ==
In 1919, a committee chaired by the Marquess of Crewe determined there existed the need to separate the agency work of the India Office from its other political and administrative roles, and recommended the transfer of all such work to "a High Commissioner for India or some similar Indian Governmental Representative in London." It was also felt popular opinion in India would view this as a step towards full Dominion status for India. The Government of India Act 1919 upheld the recommendations of the committee, making provision for "the appointment of a High Commissioner by His Majesty by Order in Council, which might delegate to the official any of the contractual powers of the Secretary of State [for India] in Council, and prescribe the conditions, under which he should act on behalf of the Government of India or any Provincial Government."

On 13 August 1920, King-Emperor George V issued the required Order in Council. Until India became independent in 1947, the post was styled "High Commissioner for India". The first High Commissioner for India was Indian Civil Service officer Sir William Stevenson Meyer; the first of Indian origin was Sir Dadiba Merwanji Dalal. The High Commissioner enjoyed the same status as his counterparts from the British Dominions. Upon Indian independence the post was given the present designation.

Proposed in 1925 by the Indian High Commissioner Sir Atul Chatterjee, the building was designed by Sir Herbert Baker and completed in 1930. It was formally inaugurated on 8 July 1930 by the King-Emperor George V.

A bust of Jawaharlal Nehru was unveiled by Prime Minister John Major in 1991.

== Emblems ==
There are twelve emblems on the outside of the building representing the various provinces of India (during the British Raj), described as follows:

Emblem	Province	Image
Bengal tiger and an East India Company ship	Bengal	
Two ships and Fort George	Bombay	
Fort St. George	Madras	
Bow and arrow, two rivers (Ganges and Yamuna), and two fishes	United Provinces	
Sun and five rivers (Beas, Chenab, Jhelum, Ravi, and Sutlej)	Punjab	
Bodhi tree and two swastikas	Bihar and Orissa	
Hills, Indian cobra, and orange and grape plantations	Central Provinces and Berar	
Indian elephant and nine lotuses	Delhi	
Indian rhinoceros	Assam	
Indian peacock	Burma	
Two Dromedary camels and hills	Baluchistan	
Crescent moon, hills, and Jamrud Fort	North West Frontier	

== See also ==
- India–United Kingdom relations
- Foreign relations of India
- Foreign relations of the United Kingdom
- List of diplomatic missions of India
- List of diplomatic missions in the United Kingdom

== Gallery ==
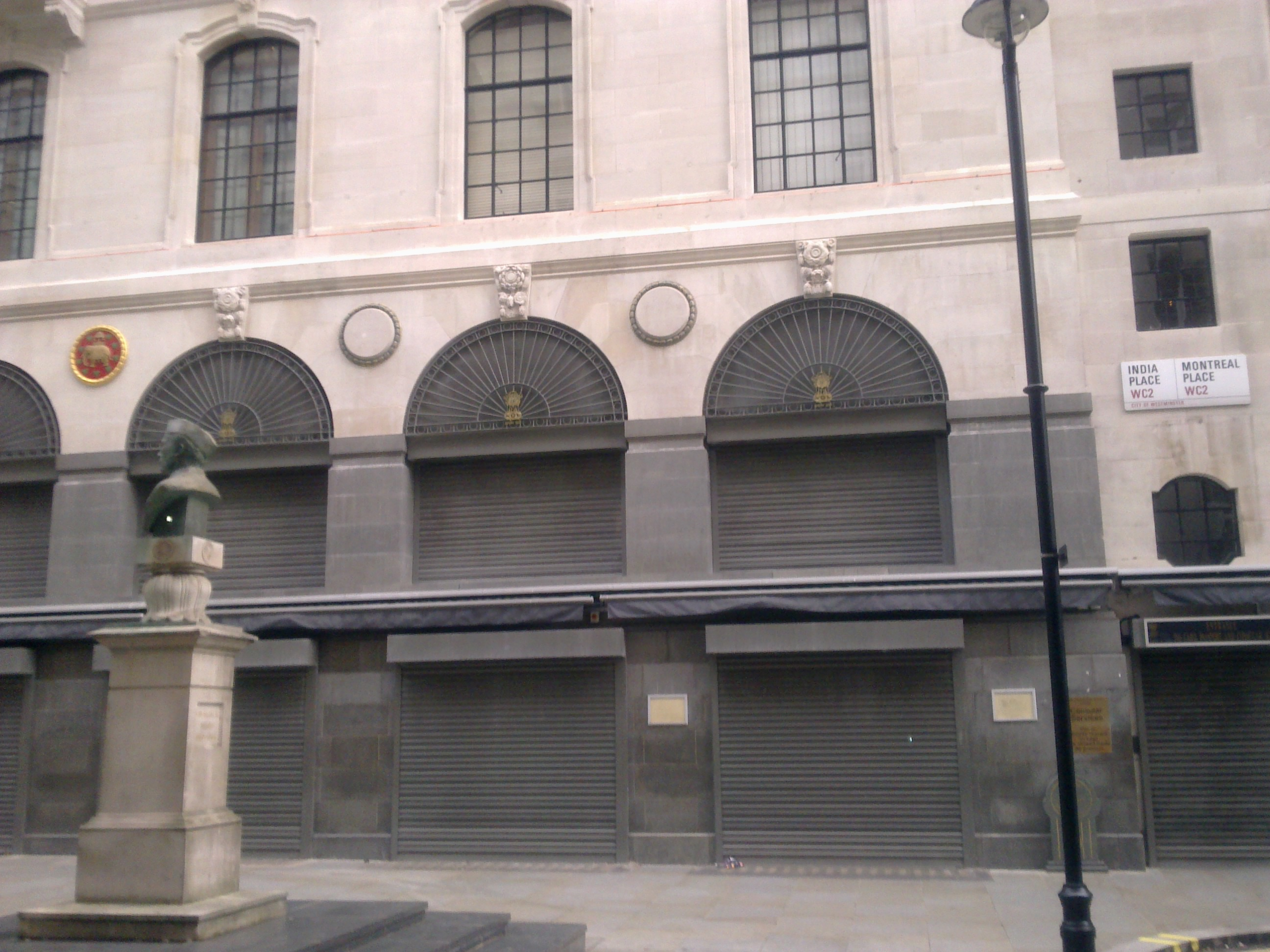
The High Commission from India Place

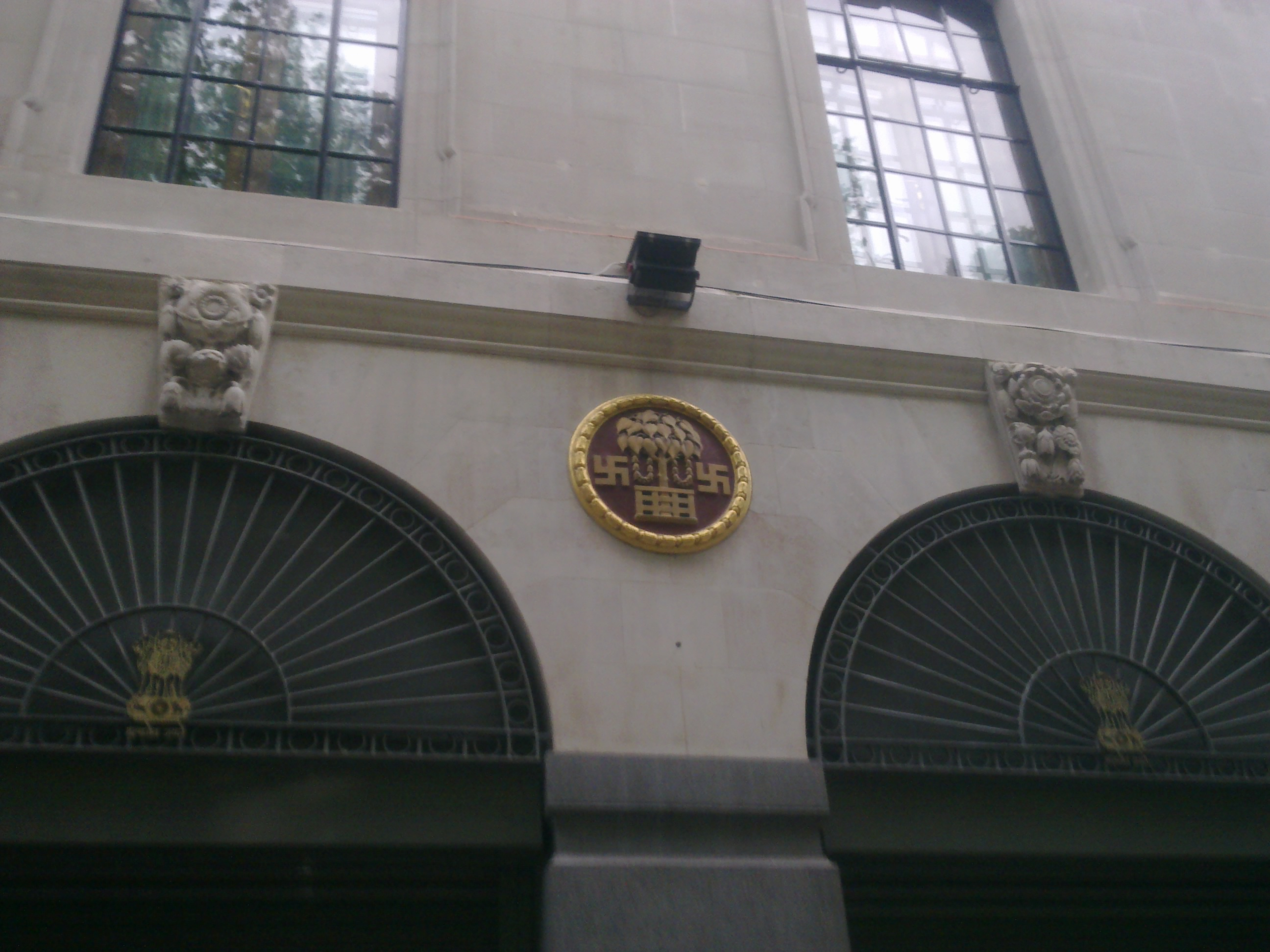
Close-up of some designs

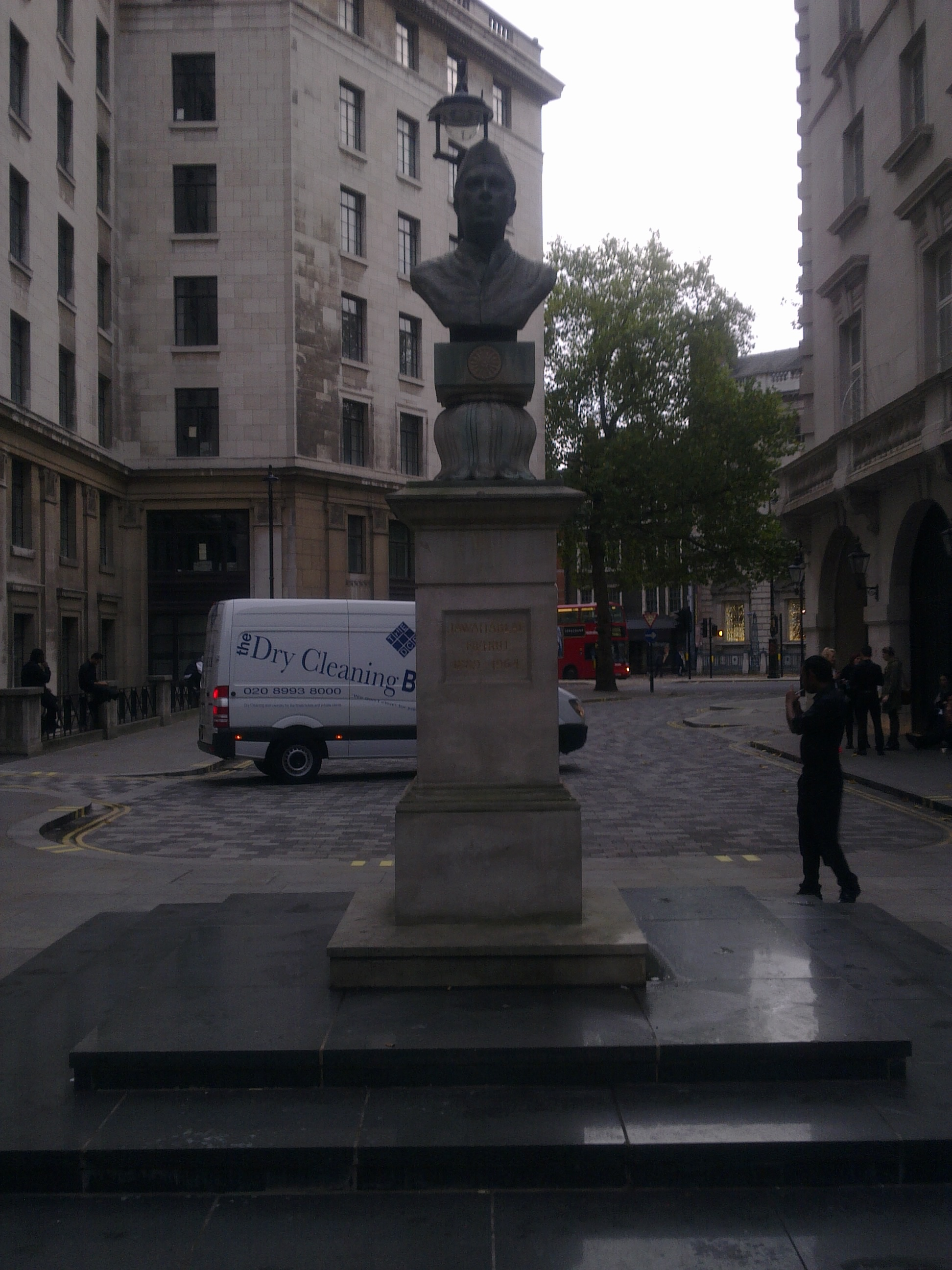
Bust of Jawaharlal Nehru on India Place
