= Bhupendra Nath Mitra =

Indian government official and diplomat

Sir Bhupendra Nath Mitra KCSI KCIE CBE (Bengali: ভূপেন্দ্র নাথ মিত্র) (October 1875 – 25 February 1937) was an Indian government official and diplomat who served as the third Indian High Commissioner to the United Kingdom from 1931 to 1936.

== Early life ==
Mitra was born in Bengal to Ashutosh Mitra and his wife. He received his early education at the Metropolitan Institution and the Hare School. Taking an MA from Presidency College, then under the University of Calcutta, in 1895, he entered government service the following year. He married and had a son and two daughters.

== Career ==
In 1910, Mitra was appointed Assistant Secretary to the Government of India, in the Finance Department. He was appointed a Companion of the Order of the Indian Empire (CIE) in the 1913 King's Birthday Honours, and was promoted to acting Deputy Secretary in the Finance Department in 1915. In the same year, he was appointed Controller of War Accounts. He was appointed an Officer of the Order of the British Empire (OBE) on 4 December 1917, becoming one of the first to be so honoured. On 8 January 1919, he was promoted to Commander of the Order of the British Empire, Civil Division (CBE), for his services to the war effort; later the same year, he was appointed Military Accountant-General. In 1922, Mitra was named Financial Advisor for Military Finance for the British Indian Army. He was knighted as a Knight Commander of the Order of the Indian Empire (KCIE) in the 1924 New Year Honours list, also becoming a member of the Viceroy's Executive Council the same year; he would remain a member of the council through 1930, briefly serving as temporary Finance Member in 1925. He was further knighted in 1928 when he was appointed a Knight Commander of the Order of the Star of India (KCSI) in that year's New Year Honours list.

== High Commissioner and later life ==
In 1931, Mitra was appointed as the third Indian High Commissioner in the United Kingdom, succeeding Sir Atul Chandra Chatterjee. The following year he was a delegate to the International Labour Conference in Geneva, also becoming president of the General Assembly of the International Institute of Agriculture in Rome. He also served as the Indian representative on the Imperial Economic Committee, becoming its vice-chairman in 1935.

Mitra was succeeded as High Commissioner in 1936 by Sir Feroz Khan Noon, and died on 25 February of the following year, aged 61.

Diplomatic posts
| Preceded by Atul Chandra Chatterjee | High Commissioner for India; 1931 - 1936 | Succeeded by Feroz Khan Noon |
