= Dadiba Merwanji Dalal =

Indian diplomat

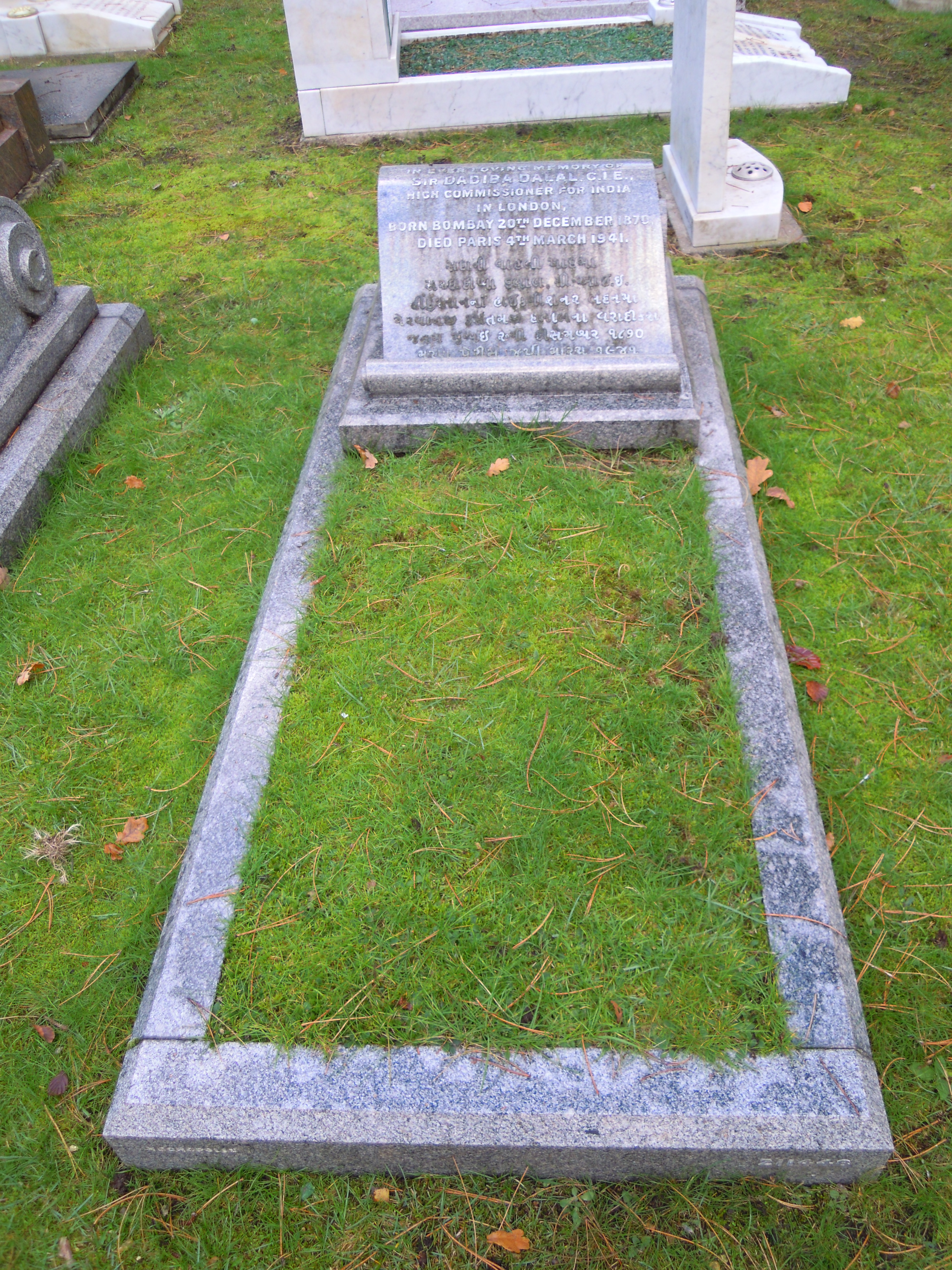
Grave of Dadiba Merwanji Dalal in Brookwood Cemetery

Sir Dadiba Merwanji Dalal CIE (12 December 1870 – 4 March 1941) was a Parsi diplomat who was the second High Commissioner for India and the first of Indian origin.

A justice of the peace, he was appointed a Companion of the Order of the Indian Empire (CIE) in the 1921 New Year Honours List. As a Member of the Council of India, he was appointed the first Indian High Commissioner for India to the United Kingdom in January 1923, succeeding the first High Commissioner Sir William Stevenson Meyer, who had died in office the previous year. He arrived in London in April, and his appointment was noted by the Spectator as "a fresh proof of the British Government's wish to conciliate Indian opinion...The fact that an Indian will now represent India in the heart of the Empire shows that the process of "Indianizing" the Services in India is no empty phrase."

Dalal was knighted in the 1924 New Year Honours List and was invested with his knighthood on 10 July, having missed his original investiture date of 28 February. He retired at the end of the year, and was succeeded by Sir Atul Chandra Chatterjee. On 4 March 1941, he died in the American Hospital of Paris during the German occupation of France, aged 70. He is buried in the Parsi Section of Brookwood Cemetery in Surrey.

Diplomatic posts
Preceded by Joseph William Bhore (acting)	High Commissioner for India; 1923 - 1924	Succeeded by Atul Chandra Chatterjee
