= Periasamy Kumaran =

Indian diplomat (born 1969)

His Excellency Periasamy Kumaran IFS
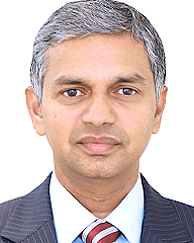
- Kumaran in 2025

High Commissioner of India to the United Kingdom
- Incumbent
- Assumed office 13 May 2026
- President: Droupadi Murmu
- Prime Minister: Narendra Modi
- Preceded by: Vikram Doraiswami

Secretary (East), Ministry of External Affairs of India
- In office 1 April 2025 – 25 March 2026
- Preceded by: Jaideep Muzumdar
- Succeeded by: Rudrendra Tandon

High Commissioner of India to Singapore
- In office July 2020 – July 2023
- Preceded by: Jawed Ashraf
- Succeeded by: Shilpak Ambule

Ambassador of India to Qatar
- In office October 2016 – July 2020
- Preceded by: Sanjiv Arora
- Succeeded by: Deepak Mittal

Personal details
- Born: 23 January 1969 (age 57) Madurai, Tamil Nadu, India
- Spouse: Ritu Kumaran
- Children: 2
- Education: IIT Madras (B.Tech)
- Occupation: Diplomat

Periasamy Kumaran (born 23 January 1969) is an Indian diplomat from the 1992 batch of Indian Foreign Service who is currently serving as the High Commissioner of India to the United Kingdom. Before that he served as the Secretary (East) in Ministry of External Affairs of India, the High Commissioner of India to Singapore and as the Indian Ambassador to Qatar.

== Early life and education ==
Kumaran was born on 23 January 1969 in Madurai, Tamil Nadu. He graduated from the Indian Institute of Technology, Madras in Chennai with a B.Tech degree in Electronics and Communication Engineering.

== Civil service career ==
Kumaran entered the Indian Foreign Service in 1992. From January 1994 to June 1997, he worked as Third Secretary at the Indian Embassy in Cairo, while studying Arabic at the American University in Cairo.

From July 1997 to December 2000, he served as Second Secretary, then First Secretary of the Indian Embassy at Tripoli, Libya. From December 2000 to September 2003, he was First Secretary of the Indian Embassy in Brussels. From September 2003 to March 2005, he was Director of the Western Europe department in the Ministry of External Affairs.

From April 2005 to June 2007 he was passport officer for the Bangalore district. From June 2007 to October 2009, he was posted to Pakistan as the Counselor to the Indian High Commission. Thereafter, he was sent to the United States, where he was the Counselor at the Indian embassy there from October 2009 to August 2011.

From September 2011 June 2014, he was Deputy High Commissioner to Sri Lanka. From July 2014 to September 2016, he was Joint Secretary of the Consular, Passport & Visa Division at the foreign ministry in New Delhi. Thereafter, he served as Ambassador to Qatar from October 2016 to July 2020.

Kumaran was appointed High Commissioner to Singapore on 26 May 2020 and presented his credentials on 25 August 2020, serving in that post from July 2020 to July 2023.

Kumaran speaks English, Tamil, Hindi and Arabic.

=== High Commissioner of India to the United Kingdom ===
Kumaran took charge as the High Commissioner of India to the United Kingdom on 13 May 2026. He presented his credentials to King Charles III on 9 June 2026.
