= William Stevenson Meyer =

Indian Civil Service officer and diplomat (1860–1922)

Sir William Stevenson Meyer GCIE KCSI (13 February 1860 – 19 October 1922) was an Indian Civil Service officer. From 1920 until his death two years later, he served as the first High Commissioner for India.

== Biography ==
Meyer was born to a Presbyterian minister, Theodore Jonah Meyer, and his wife Jane Ann. His younger sister was the mathematician Margaret Meyer. He attended University College School and University College London, before entering the Indian Civil Service in 1881. Meyer was assigned to the Madras Presidency as an assistant secretary, where he rose to become Chief Secretary of the Board of Revenue in 1890. In 1895, he entered the service of the Government of India as a deputy secretary in the Financial Department, and was appointed a Companion of the Order of the Indian Empire (CIE) on 9 November 1901. From 1902 to 1908, he was the editor of The Imperial Gazetteer of India along with Sir Herbert Hope Risley, Sir Richard Burn and James Sutherland Cotton.

He subsequently served on the Royal Commission of Decentralization from 1907 to 1909 and on the Nicholson Committee on the British Indian Army in 1912-13. He was knighted as a Knight Commander of the Order of the Indian Empire (KCIE) in the 1909 Birthday Honours list.

From 1914, Meyer served as Finance Member of the Government of India, incurring some criticism concerning its perceived lack of enthusiasm for the Mesopotamian Campaign (1914-18) conducted by the Military Department of India. However, he was cleared of all blame by a parliamentary committee, which showed he had always released funds to the Indian military upon request. He was appointed a Knight Commander of the Order of the Star of India (KCSI) in the 1915 Birthday Honours list. Appointed President of the Central Recruiting Board in 1917, he succeeded in attracting large numbers of recruits. He retired the following year. For his long service in India, he was appointed a Knight Grand Commander of the Order of the Indian Empire (GCIE) on 27 September 1918.

Sir William was appointed the first High Commissioner for India on 19 September 1920, with J. W. Bhore as his secretary. However, Meyer did not last long in his new post; on 19 October 1922, while walking on the street in Westminster, he collapsed and died of a sudden heart attack, aged 62. His secretary Bhore served as acting High Commissioner until April 1923, when Dadiba Merwanji Dalal was appointed.
