= List of colleges affiliated to the Delhi University =

Colleges of DU

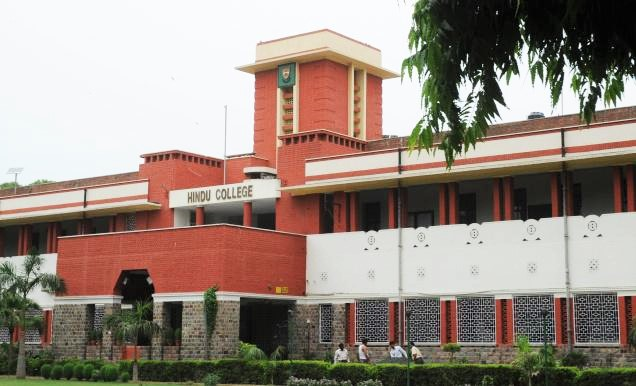
The main building at Hindu College, one of the oldest colleges affiliated to the University of Delhi

The University of Delhi (UOD), informally known as Delhi University (DU), is a collegiate public central university, located in Delhi, India. It was founded in 1922 by an Act of the Central Legislative Assembly. As a collegiate university, its main functions are divided between the academic departments of the university and affiliated colleges. Consisting of three colleges, two faculties, and 750 students at its founding, the University of Delhi has since become India's largest institution of higher learning and among the largest in the world. The university currently consists of 16 faculties and 86 departments distributed across its North and South campuses and an enrollment of over 162,000 regular students and 261,000 non-formal students. The Vice-President of India serves as the university's chancellor.

The University of Delhi is composed of 77 affiliated colleges and 5 other recognized institutes.

== Colleges ==
Name	Established	Location
Aditi Mahavidyalaya, Bawana	1994	North Campus
Daulat Ram College	1960	North Campus
Hindu College	1899	North Campus
Hansraj College	1948	North Campus
Indraprastha College for Women, Kashmere Gate	1924	North Campus
Kirori Mal College	1954	North Campus
Miranda House	1948	North Campus
Ramjas College	1917	North Campus
St. Stephen's College	1881	North Campus
Shaheed Sukhdev College of Business Studies, Rohini	1987	North Campus
Shri Ram College of Commerce	1926	North Campus
Sri Guru Tegh Bahadur Khalsa College	1951	North Campus
School of Open Learning	1962	North Campus
Swami Shraddhanand College, Alipur	1967	North Campus
Acharya Narendra Dev College, Govindpuri	1991	South Campus
Aryabhatta College	1973	South Campus
Atma Ram Sanatan Dharma College	1959	South Campus
Delhi College of Arts and Commerce, Netaji Nagar	1987	South Campus
Jesus and Mary College, Chanakyapuri	1968	South Campus
Maitreyi College, Chanakyapuri	1967	South Campus
Motilal Nehru College	1964	South Campus
Motilal Nehru College (Evening)	1965	South Campus
Ram Lal Anand College	1964	South Campus
Sri Venkateswara College	1961	South Campus
College of Vocational Studies, Sheikh Sarai	1972	South Campus
Delhi Institute of Pharmaceutical Sciences and Research, Pushp Vihar	1964	South Campus
Deshbandhu College, Kalkaji	1952	South Campus
Dyal Singh College, Pragati Vihar	1959	South Campus
Gargi College, Siri Fort	1967	South Campus
Institute of Home Economics, Hauz Khas	1961	South Campus
Kamala Nehru College, Siri Fort	1964	South Campus
Lady Shri Ram College for Women, Lajpat Nagar	1956	South Campus
P.G.D.A.V. College, Lajpat Nagar	1957	South Campus
P.G.D.A.V. College (Evening)	1958	South Campus
Rajkumari Amrit Kaur College of Nursing, Lajpat Nagar	1946	South Campus
Ramanujan College, Kalkaji	2010	South Campus
Sri Aurobindo College, Malviya Nagar	1972	South Campus
Sri Aurobindo College (Evening)	1984	South Campus
Shaheed Bhagat Singh College Sheikh Sarai	1967	South Campus
Shaheed Bhagat Singh College (Evening)	1973	South Campus
Dyal Singh Evening College	1958	South Campus
Ayurvedic and Unani Tibbia College, Karol Bagh	1916	Central Campus
College of Art, Mandi House	1942	Central Campus
Janki Devi Memorial College, Rajinder Nagar	1959	Central Campus
Lady Hardinge Medical College, Connaught Place	1916	Central Campus
Lady Irwin College, Mandi House	1932	Central Campus
Mata Sundri College for Women, Mandi House	1967	Central Campus
Maulana Azad Institute of Dental Sciences	2003	Central Campus
Maulana Azad Medical College	1956	Central Campus
Sri Guru Nanak Dev Khalsa College, Karol Bagh	1973	Central Campus
Zakir Husain Delhi College, Ajmeri Gate	1792	Central Campus
Zakir Husain Delhi College (Evening)	1958	Central Campus
Maharaja Agrasen College, Vasundhara Enclave	1994	East Delhi
Maharshi Valmiki College of Education, Geeta Colony	1996	East Delhi
Shaheed Rajguru College of Applied Sciences for Women, Vasundhara Enclave	1989	East Delhi
Shyam Lal College, Shahdara	1964	East Delhi
Shyam Lal College (Evening)	1969	East Delhi
Vivekananda College, Vivek Vihar	1970	East Delhi
Nehru Homoeopathic Medical College and Hospital	1967	South Delhi
Bhim Rao Ambedkar College	1991	North East Delhi
University College of Medical Sciences	1971	North East Delhi
Bharati College, Janakpuri	1971	West Delhi
Deen Dayal Upadhyaya College, Dwarka	1990	West Delhi
Indira Gandhi Institute of Physical Education and Sports Sciences	1987	West Delhi
Kalindi College, Patel Nagar	1967	West Delhi
Rajdhani College, Raja Garde	1964	West Delhi
Shivaji College, Raja Garden	1961	West Delhi
Shyama Prasad Mukherji College, Punjabi Bagh	1969	West Delhi
Keshav Mahavidyalaya, Pitampura	1994	North West Delhi
Lakshmibai College, Ashok Vihar	1965	North West Delhi
Satyawati College, Ashok Vihar	1972	North West Delhi
Satyawati College (Evening)	1973	North West Delhi
Sri Guru Gobind Singh College of Commerce, Pitampura	1984	North West Delhi
Bhagini Nivedita College, Kair	1993	South West Delhi
Bhaskaracharya College of Applied Sciences, Dwarka	1995	South West Delhi

== Institutes ==
- Ahilya Bai College of Nursing
- Amar Jyoti Institute of Physiotherapy
- Chacha Nehru Bal Chikitsalaya
- College of Nursing at Army Hospital (R & R)
- Durgabai Deshmukh College of Special Education
- Holy Family College of Nursing
- Pt. Deendayal Upadhyaya Institute of Physically Handicapped
- School of Rehabilitation Sciences
