= List of institutions of higher education in Delhi =

List

This is a list of education institutions in Delhi in the National Capital Region, India.

== Universities ==
In Delhi there are 2 Institutes of Eminence, 7 central universities including an international university established by the eight member nations of South Asian Association for Regional Co-operation (SAARC), 11 state universities, 10 deemed universities and 7 autonomous.

Universities of Delhi
University	District	Type	Established	Specialization	Sources
AIIMS Delhi (All India Institute of Medical Sciences)	South Delhi	Autonomous	1956	Medicine	
Ambedkar University	Central Delhi	State	2007	Social sciences, humanities	
DPSRU (Delhi Pharmaceutical Science and Research University)	South Delhi	State	1964 (2015^{†})	Pharmaceutical science	
DSU (Delhi Sports University)	Central Delhi	State	2020	Sports	
NSUT (Netaji Subhash University of Technology)	South West Delhi	State	1983 (2018^{†})	Technology	
DeTU (Delhi Teachers University)	Outer North Delhi	State	2022	Education	
DTU (Delhi Technological University)	North West Delhi	State	1941 (2009^{†})	Technology	
GGSIU (Guru Gobind Singh Indraprastha University)	South West Delhi (main campus)	State	1998	General	
ICAR's IARI (Indian Agricultural Research Institute)	West Delhi	Deemed	1902 (1958^{†})	Agriculture	
IGDTUW (Indira Gandhi Delhi Technical University for Women)	Central Delhi	State	1998 (2013^{†})	Women's only, technology University	
IIFT (Indian Institute of Foreign Trade)	South Delhi	Deemed	1963 (2002^{†})	Foreign trade	
IIMC (Indian Institute of Mass Communication)	South Delhi	Autonomous	1965	Mass Communication	
IIT Delhi (Indian Institute of Technology)	South Delhi	Autonomous	1961	Technology, Engineering, Science and Management	
DSEU (Delhi Skill and Entrepreneurship University)	South West Delhi	State	2020	General	
ILI (Indian Law Institute)	New Delhi	Deemed	1956 (2004^{†})	Legal	
ISI (Indian Statistical Institute)	South Delhi	Deemed	1974	Formal Sciences and economics	
IGNOU (Indira Gandhi National Open University)	South Delhi	Central	1985	Distance education	
IIIT (Indraprastha Institute of Information Technology)	South East Delhi	State	2008	Information technology	
ILSB (Institute of Liver and Biliary Sciences)	South Delhi	Deemed	2009	Hepatology	
JH (Jamia Hamdard)	South Delhi	Deemed	1906 (1989^{†})	General	
JMI (Jamia Millia Islamia)	South East Delhi	Central	1920 (1988^{†})	General	
JNU (Jawaharlal Nehru University)	South Delhi	Central	1969	General	
NIEDSSU (National Institute Of Education Development Society & Sports Council)	Outer North Delhi	Autonomous	2013	Physical Education, Sports Training	
NIFT (National Institute of Fashion Technology)	South Delhi	Deemed	1986	Fashion technology	
NIHM Delhi (National Institute of Hotel Management)	Central Delhi	Autonomous	2026	Hospitality Management	
NIT Delhi (National Institute of Technology)	North West Delhi	Autonomous	2010	Engineering, Humanities and Management	
NLU (National Law University)	South West Delhi	State	2008	Legal	
NMIHACM (National Museum Institute of the History of Art, Conservation and Museology)	New Delhi	Deemed	1983 (1989^{†})	Arts	
NSD (National School of Drama)	New Delhi	Autonomous^{‡}	1959	Drama	
NIEPA (National Institute of Educational Planning and Administration)	South Delhi	Deemed	1962 (2006^{†})	Education administration	
CSU (Central Sanskrit University)	West Delhi	Central	1970 (2002^{†})	Sanskrit	
SPA (School of Planning and Architecture)	Central Delhi	Deemed	1959 (1979^{†})	Architecture	
SLBSNSU (Shri Lal Bahadur Shastri National Sanskrit University)	South Delhi	Central	1962 (1987^{†})	Sanskrit	
SAU (South Asian University)	South Delhi	Central	2010	General	
DU (Delhi University)	North Delhi (North Campus) & South West (South Campus)	Central	1922	General	

- ^{†} granted deemed/state/central university status
- ^{‡} The National School of Drama was granted deemed university status in 2005. However, in 2011 the status was revoked on the institute's request. Its current status is Autonomous.

== Colleges ==
=== Colleges under DU ===
See also List of colleges under Delhi University

Name	Established	Location/Campus
Aditi Mahavidyalaya	1994	North Campus
Zakir Husain Delhi College	1696	North Campus
Daulat Ram College	1960	North Campus
Hindu College	1899	North Campus
Hansraj College	1948	North Campus
Indraprastha College for Women	1924	North Campus
Kirori Mal College	1954	North Campus
Miranda House	1948	North Campus
Ramjas College	1917	North Campus
St. Stephen's College	1881	North Campus
Shaheed Sukhdev College of Business Studies	1987	North Campus
Shri Ram College of Commerce	1926	North Campus
Sri Guru Tegh Bahadur Khalsa College	1951	North Campus
School of Open Learning	1962	North Campus
Swami Shraddhanand College	1967	North Campus
Vallabhbhai Patel Chest Institute	1949	North Campus
Acharya Narendra Dev College	1991	South Campus
Aryabhatta College	1973	South Campus
Atma Ram Sanatan Dharma College	1959	South Campus
Delhi College of Arts and Commerce	1987	South Campus
Jesus and Mary College	1968	South Campus
Maitreyi College	1967	South Campus
Motilal Nehru College	1964	South Campus
Motilal Nehru College (Evening)	1965	South Campus
Ram Lal Anand College	1964	South Campus
Sri Venkateswara College	1961	South Campus
College of Vocational Studies	1972	South Campus
Delhi Institute of Pharmaceutical Sciences and Research	1964	South Campus
Deshbandhu College	1952	South Campus
Dyal Singh College	1959	South Campus
Gargi College	1967	South Campus
Institute of Home Economics	1961	South Campus
Kamala Nehru College	1964	South Campus
Lady Shri Ram College for Women	1956	South Campus
P.G.D.A.V. College	1957	South Campus
P.G.D.A.V. College (Evening)	1958	South Campus
Rajkumari Amrit Kaur College of Nursing	1946	South Campus
Ramanujan College	2010	South Campus
Sri Aurobindo College	1972	South Campus
Sri Aurobindo College (Evening)	1984	South Campus
Shaheed Bhagat Singh College	1967	South Campus
Shaheed Bhagat Singh College (Evening)	1973	South Campus
Vande Mataram College	1958	South Campus
Ayurvedic and Unani Tibbia College	1916	Central Campus
College of Art	1942	Central Campus
Janki Devi Memorial College	1959	Central Campus
Lady Hardinge Medical College	1916	Central Campus
Lady Irwin College	1932	Central Campus
Mata Sundri College for Women	1967	Central Campus
Maulana Azad Institute of Dental Sciences	2003	Central Campus
Maulana Azad Medical College	1956	Central Campus
Sri Guru Nanak Dev Khalsa College	1973	Central Campus
Zakir Husain Delhi College	1792	Central Campus
Zakir Husain Delhi College (Evening)	1958	Central Campus
Maharaja Agrasen College	1994	East Delhi
Maharshi Valmiki College of Education	1996	East Delhi
Shaheed Rajguru College of Applied Sciences for Women	1989	East Delhi
Shyam Lal College	1964	East Delhi
Shyam Lal College (Evening)	1969	East Delhi
Vivekananda College	1970	East Delhi
Nehru Homoeopathic Medical College and Hospital	1967	South Delhi
Bhim Rao Ambedkar College	1991	North East Delhi
University College of Medical Sciences	1971	North East Delhi
Bharati College	1971	West Delhi
Indira Gandhi Institute of Physical Education and Sports Sciences	1987	West Delhi
Kalindi College	1967	West Delhi
Rajdhani College	1964	West Delhi
Shivaji College	1961	West Delhi
Shyama Prasad Mukherji College	1969	West Delhi
Keshav Mahavidyalaya	1994	North West Delhi
Lakshmibai College	1965	North West Delhi
Satyawati College	1972	North West Delhi
Satyawati College (Evening)	1973	North West Delhi
Sri Guru Gobind Singh College of Commerce	1984	North West Delhi
Bhagini Nivedita College	1993	South West Delhi
Lady Irwin College	1932	South West Delhi
Deen Dayal Upadhyaya College	1990	South West Delhi
Bhaskaracharya College of Applied Sciences	1995	

=== Colleges under GGSIPU ===
See also list of colleges under Guru Gobind Singh Indraprastha University

== Other Institutes ==
- K.R. Mangalam University
- Delhi School of Music
- Indian Institute of Planning and Management (IIPM)
- TERI University, Deemed to be university, Delhi
