= MSc colleges in Delhi =

Delhi, the capital city of India, hosts a wide array of institutions offering Master of Science (MSc) programs across disciplines such as Physics, Chemistry, Mathematics, Biotechnology, Computer Science, and Environmental Science. Admissions are generally through university or national-level entrance exams like the Delhi University Entrance Test (DUET), Jawaharlal Nehru University Combined Entrance Examination (JNU CEEB), and IIT JAM. MSc programs in Delhi typically span two years, combining theoretical coursework with laboratory and research experience. Programs are offered by central universities, technical institutes, and private universities, providing students with a wide variety of specializations and career pathways.

== Educational landscape ==
According to the Ministry of Education's *All India Survey on Higher Education (AISHE) 2023–24*, Delhi records one of the highest gross enrollment ratios in postgraduate science programs in India, supported by over 40 recognized institutions offering MSc-level education. The city attracts students nationwide due to its concentration of central universities, research centers, and public-funded science programs.

== Prominent colleges and universities offering MSc in Delhi ==
Delhi University offers a wide range of MSc programs through its constituent colleges. Notable colleges include:

College Name	University	MSc Specializations	Entrance Exam	Duration	Reference
St. Stephen's College	University of Delhi	Physics, Chemistry, Mathematics	DUET	2 years	
Hindu College	University of Delhi	Botany, Zoology, Physics	DUET	2 years	
Miranda House	University of Delhi	Life Sciences, Mathematics	DUET	2 years	
Hansraj College	University of Delhi	Chemistry, Physics	DUET	2 years	
Ramjas College	University of Delhi	Botany, Zoology, Statistics	DUET	2 years	
Acharya Narendra Dev College	University of Delhi	Chemistry, Life Sciences	DUET	2 years	
Jawaharlal Nehru University	Jawaharlal Nehru University	Physics, Chemistry, Life Sciences, Environmental Sciences	JNU CEEB	2 years	
Indian Institute of Technology Delhi	Indian Institute of Technology Delhi	Physics, Chemistry, Mathematics	IIT JAM	2 years	
Jamia Millia Islamia	Jamia Millia Islamia	Physics, Chemistry, Biotechnology	JMI Entrance Exam	2 years	
Guru Gobind Singh Indraprastha University	Guru Gobind Singh Indraprastha University	Environmental Science, Biotechnology, Applied Sciences	GGSIPU Entrance Exam	2 years	
Jamia Hamdard University	Jamia Hamdard University	Pharmaceutical Sciences, Biotechnology	Jamia Hamdard Entrance Exam	2 years	
Amity University, Noida	Amity University	Biotechnology, Microbiology, Data Science	Amity Entrance Exam	2 years	
Indira Gandhi National Open University	Indira Gandhi National Open University	Distance MSc in various disciplines	IGNOU Entrance / Open Admission	2 years	

== Eligibility Criteria ==
To apply for an MSc programme in Delhi, students are generally required to have a B.Sc. degree in a relevant field from a recognised university, with at least 50–60% marks in their undergraduate studies. Most universities, such as Delhi University (DU), Jawaharlal Nehru University (JNU), and Jamia Millia Islamia (JMI), admit students through the CUET-PG entrance exam, while some colleges also provide merit-based admission to their own graduates. The exact requirements differ depending on the subject — for example, M.Sc. Chemistry applicants should have studied Chemistry and Mathematics, whereas M.Sc. Computer Science candidates need a background in Computer Science or a related discipline. Relaxation in eligibility marks is available for students from SC, ST, OBC, and EWS categories in accordance with government regulations.

== Emerging trends ==
MSc education in Delhi has been advancing in a direction of which is mainly characterized by interdisciplinary learning, collaboration with certain industries, and the application of modern technologies for both teaching and research. The universities has started to gradually reorganize their courses according to the NEP 2020's approach of mixed disciplines, flexibility in educational terms, and measurable learning outcomes.

Besides that, the demand for people with qualifications in upcoming scientific domains is steadily increasing, and thus, institutions like IIT Delhi, Jamia Millia Islamia, and the University of Delhi have opened up new MSc specializations in Data Analytics, Artificial Intelligence in Science, Climate Studies, and Computational Biology, among others. These offerings demonstrate the transformation in both academic and industrial requirements and thus, prepare students for careers that are research-oriented and technology-based.

== Admission Criteria ==
Eligibility for admission in MSc colleges in Delhi typically includes:

- A Bachelor's degree in a relevant field (e.g., BSc in the respective subject).
- A minimum percentage or CGPA as specified by the respective institution.
- Successful performance in the entrance examination conducted by the university or institute.

== Research and collaborations ==
Delhi's MSc institutions are recognized for their active participation in national science initiatives. Universities such as IIT Delhi, JNU, and the University of Delhi collaborate with government bodies under programs like *INSPIRE*, *DST-SERB*, and *DBT-BUILDER*. Faculty and postgraduate researchers frequently contribute to international journals, with research in renewable energy, nanoscience, and computational biology gaining prominence.

== Career opportunities and placements ==
According to the *India Skills Report 2025*, MSc graduates from Delhi demonstrate among the highest employability scores in research and data analytics sectors across India. Universities such as Delhi University and Jamia Millia Islamia organize annual job fairs connecting students with national research laboratories, pharmaceutical firms, and IT companies.

== Rankings and recognition ==
In the *NIRF 2025 University Rankings*, IIT Delhi, Jawaharlal Nehru University, and Delhi University are all listed among India's top 10 for science education and research output. IIT Delhi also features within the top 200 globally for Natural Sciences in the *QS World University Rankings by Subject 2025*.

== Notable References from News & Academic Sources ==
- "DU extends single girl child quota to PG courses from 2025". Times of India. 2025-05-10.
- "RRU announces MSc programme with focus on national security". Economic Times. 2025-06-12.
- "Bomb scare in Delhi: 20 colleges, including St Stephen's & Jamia, receive hoax email threats". Times of India. 2025-08-20.
- "Academic Reforms in Delhi University: A Case Study". JSTOR. JSTOR 23610487.
- Schenkman, Alfred S. (1954). "Higher Education in India". Far Eastern Survey. 23 (2): 24–28. doi:10.2307/3023810. JSTOR 3023810.

== See also ==
- Education in Delhi
- Higher education in India
- Science education in India
- List of universities in Delhi
- National Institutional Ranking Framework
- List of colleges affiliated to Delhi University
