= KMV (disambiguation) =

KMV may refer to:

- Kavminvodyavia, an airline based in Mineralnye Vody in the Caucasus, Russia
- kmv, the ISO 639-3 code for Karipúna French Creole
- Keshav Mahavidyalaya, a constituent college of the University of Delhi
- Kalaymyo Airport, the IATA code KMV
- Komiinteravia, the ICAO code KMV
