= RLA =

RLA may refer to any of the following:

- Rafael López Aliaga (born 1961), Peruvian politician
- Railway Labor Act, US
- Ram Lal Anand College, New Delhi, India
- Risk-limiting audit of election outcomes
- Robert Land Academy, Canadian military-themed academy
- Rod Laver Arena, Melbourne, Australia
- Royal Lao Army
- Russian Liberation Army (a.k.a. ROA) collaborationist formation, primarily composed of Russians, that fought under German command during World War II.
