= Motilal Nehru College =

Constituent college of University of Delhi

- मोतिलाल नेहरू कॉलेज
- Motto: bhudhirjñānēn shudhyati (Sanskrit)
- Motto in English: Knowledge Purifies the Mind
- Type: Public Central Government (Coed College)
- Established: 1964; 62 years ago
- Affiliations: University of Delhi
- Principal: Yogeshwar Sharma
- Faculty: 50+
- Students: 3000+ (2026-27)
- Location: Benito Juarez Marg, South Campus, New Delhi, 110021; 28°34′37.64″N 77°9′39.2″E
- Campus: Urban, South Campus 9.41 acres (0.04 sq.km)
- Colours
- Nickname: MLNC
- Website: mlncdu.ac.in

Motilal Nehru College (MLNC) is one of the largest constituent colleges of the University of Delhi, located on Benito Juarez Marg in the South Campus area of New Delhi, India. Established in 1964, the college offers undergraduate and postgraduate programmes in the humanities, social sciences, commerce and sciences. It is named after Motilal Nehru, an Indian lawyer, nationalist and political leader. There is also an evening college operating in the same campus premises called Motilal Nehru College Evening.

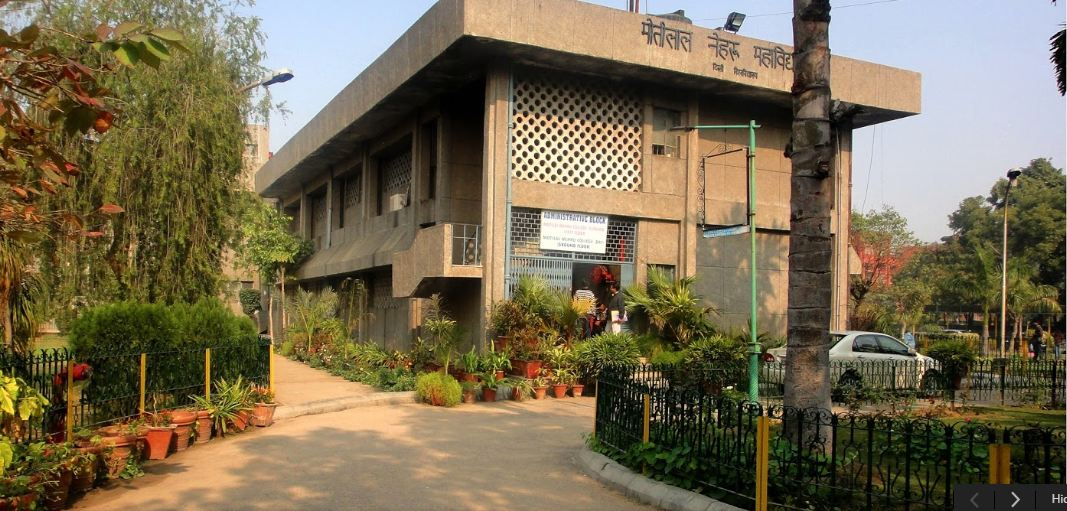
A view of the administrative building

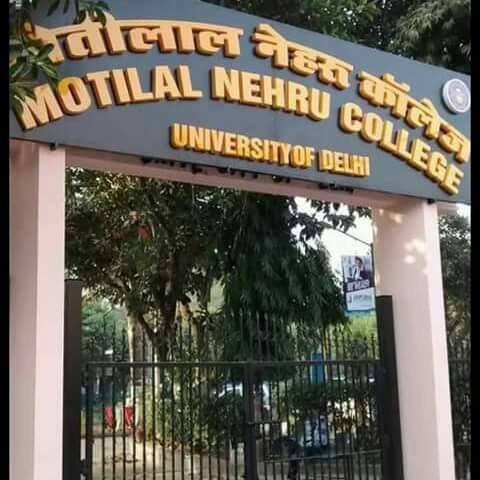
Entrance gate of Motilal Nehru College

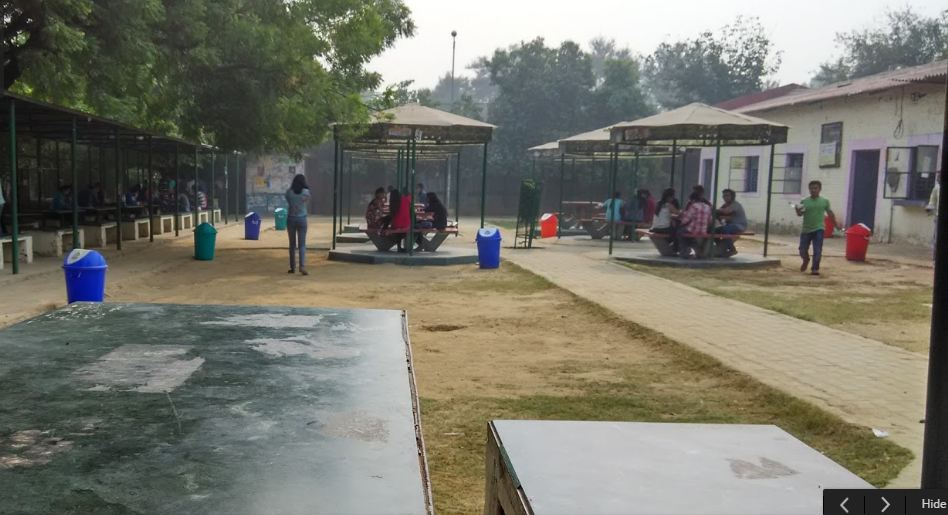
The college canteen

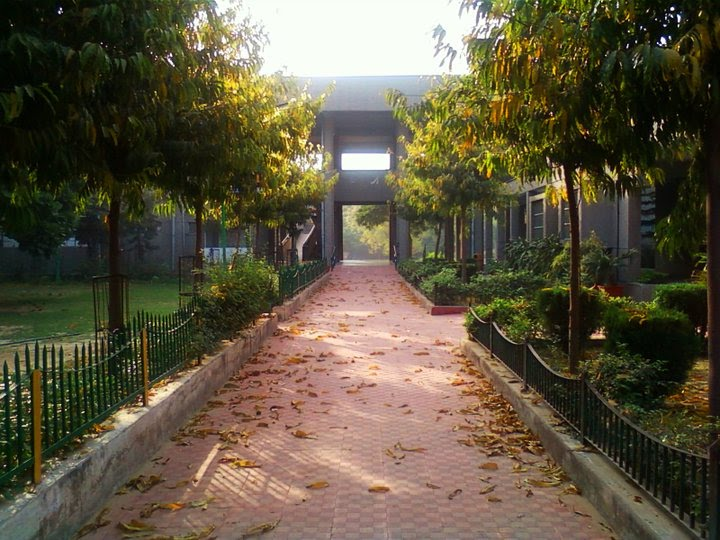
An inside view

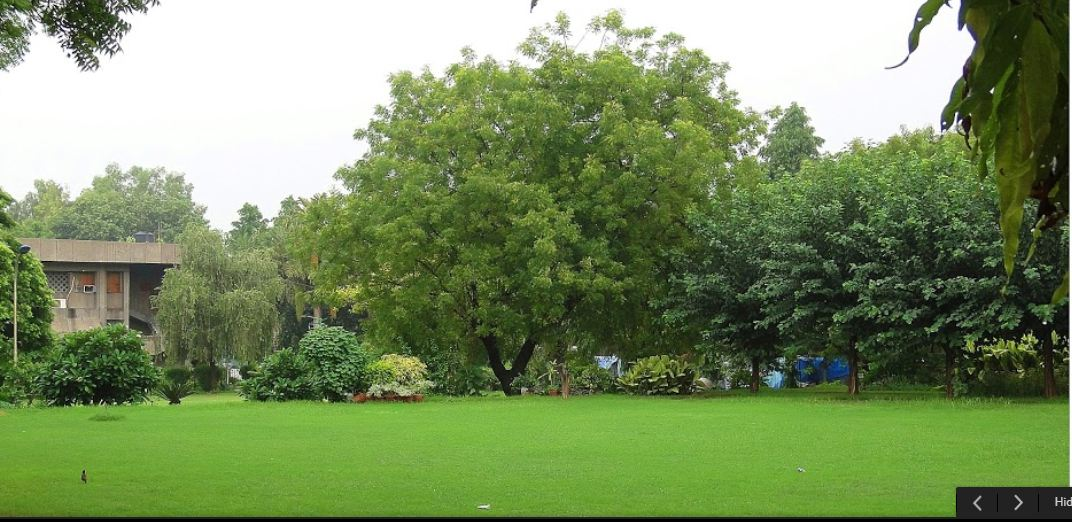
The campus

The college began as a government college in 1964 in a school building at Moti Bagh, New Delhi, with an initial enrolment of 274 students. It subsequently underwent several changes in name and administration before being renamed Motilal Nehru College in 1977. The college moved to its present campus in 1989.

The college has a campus comprising academic and administrative buildings, a library, laboratories, lecture facilities and sports facilities.The college has a number of notable alumni who have contributed to fields such as politics, public administration, law, academia, journalism, business, Corporate and the arts. Its alumni include public figures, politicians, civil servants, scholars, artists, athletes, journalists and professionals who have held positions in India and abroad. The college's alumni network forms an important part of its institutional identity and reflects the range of careers pursued by its graduates It serves students from Delhi and other parts of India and is one of the constituent colleges of the University of Delhi.

== History ==
=== Founding & early history ===
Motilal Nehru College MLNC University of Delhi is a constituent college of the University of Delhi, was established in 1964 as Government Degree College in a government school building with around 300 students. It was later known as Hastinapur College (1966–1977) operated out of a school building in Moti Bagh, New Delhi and was renamed Motilal Nehru College on 10 January 1977, in honour of Pandit Motilal Nehru, a distinguished freedom fighter and national leader.

=== New campus development ===
In 1989, the college moved to its present campus on Benito Juarez Road, South Campus, New Delhi. The new campus provided expanded facilities, including spacious lawns, administrative buildings, a library, well-equipped laboratories, and modern computer facilities.

Over the decades, Motilal Nehru College has expanded its academic community, with more than 140 faculty members and 3,000 students from across India. The college offers undergraduate programmes in the humanities, commerce, and sciences, alongside co-curricular activities. In 2024, Motilal Nehru College marked 60 years since its establishment.

== Campus ==
Motilal Nehru College (MLNC), a constituent college of the University of Delhi, is located on Benito Juarez Marg in South Campus of Delhi University, PIN - 110021. It is connected via the Outer Ring Road and by the Delhi metro. The college has a spacious, green, and student-friendly campus with facilities such as campus-wide Wi-Fi, academic and cultural societies, seminars, a college magazine, and an active Students’ Union. Students can also benefit from scholarships, fee and travel concessions, and student aid funds. The campus is well connected by Outer Ring Road and Delhi metro, with Durgabai Deshmukh South Campus Metro Station, DTC nearby, and is close to several prominent educational institutions.The nearby locality is Basant Gaon, Anandniketan, Satyaniketan and Munirka, South Extension, Naraina and more . The campus is also close to other educational institutions such as the Ram Lal Anand College, Aryabhatta College, Sri Venkateswara College, Atma Ram Sanatan Dharma College, Jawaharlal Nehru University, Indian Institute of Foreign Trade, All India Institute of Medical Sciences, National Institute of Fashion Technology, IIT Delhi.

=== Academic buildings ===
The MLNC campus is divided into Blocks:

- Admin Block
- R-Block & Tutorial-Block
- Generator Block
- Lecture theatre (Science Block)
- Swami Vivekananda Block
- Jubilee Block
- PC

And other are the Student Activity Area cricket ground, basketball courts, VolleyBall Court and Badminton Court

Academic Zone :

- Classrooms and laboratories: The college has spacious, well-lit classrooms and Lecture theatres with modern teaching aids. Specialized science and computer laboratories support practical learning.
- Library: The central library holds over 1,00,000 volumes, along with access to digital journals, e-books, and the Delhi University e-resources. It provides quiet reading areas and computer terminals for research.
- Seminar halls & auditoriums: MLNC has an air-conditioned seminar hall where lectures, workshops, paper presentations, and cultural events are regularly held. A large auditorium is currently under construction.
- NCC Room
- NSS Room
- Student Union Room
- Girls Common Room

Student Service's and Welfare :

- Wi-Fi Campus: The college provides free Wi-Fi connectivity across the entire campus, ensuring that students and staff have continuous access to online resources and learning platforms.
- Medical facility: The college has a medical room with a qualified part-time doctor and first-aid services. Health camps and awareness programs are also organized.
- Travel Concession: Students are eligible for concessions on DTC (Delhi Transport Corporation) bus passes, allowing affordable transportation throughout the city College has Bus Stop named Motilal Nehru College Bus Stop. The college provides documentation and assistance for availing these services.
- Fee Concession & Student Aid Funds: MLNC provides full or partial fee concessions to economically weaker students. Through the Student Aid Fund, deserving candidates can apply for financial assistance annually based on academic performance and need.
- Scholarships: A range of government and private scholarships are available, including merit-based, need-based, SC/ST/OBC scholarships, and those for differently-abled students. The college office helps students apply through the university and national portals.

The student activity zone area Quadrangle named Sundari Chowk, Open Sitting Area

- Admin Lawn
- Library Lawn
- Common Ground
- Canteen.

== Rankings ==
- National rankings:47
- Subject-specific rankings:

Commerce : 47 Science : 50 Arts: 56

- Ranking year:2026
- Ranking organization:India Today-MDRA

== Organisation and administration ==
Professor Yogeshwar Sharma is the Principal of the college and supervised the various activities of the college through designated committees. The Principal is also a Member Secretary of the governing body.

=== Governance ===
Name	Designation
Prof. Anu G. Aggarwal	Chairperson, MLNC Governing Body
Prof. Yamini Gupt	Treasurer, MLNC Governing Body
Prof. Yogeshwar Sharma	Member Secretary (Principal,MLNC)
Prof. Sandeep Kumar Garg	Principal, MLNC (Evening)
Prof. Vandana Sethu	College Teacher Representative MLNC
Dr. Amarjeet	College Teacher Representative MLNC
Dr. Kasturi Chowdhury	College Teachers’ Representative MLNC Evening
Ms. Swagata Roy	College Teachers’ Representative MLNC Evening

Several members are nominated from various walks of public life to its Governing Body as per provisions of statute 30(1)(c)(i) of Delhi University Act, 1922.

== Admission ==
- Selection Criteria:

Candidate must be a citizen of India or Overseas Citizen of India (OCI). Admission is based solely on the scores obtained in the Common University Entrance Test (CUET UG) conducted by NTA.

- Eligibility Criteria:

Candidates must have passed Class 12 or equivalent from a recognized board, generally with a minimum of 45-50% aggregate in relevant subjects

- Admission Process:

For admission to Undergraduate Programmes at University of Delhi, all candidates (including those applying under supernumerary quota) must register for CUET (UG) at cuet.nta.nic.in. For seat allocations and admissions, candidates must apply to the Common Seat Allocation System (CSAS(UG) of University of Delhi. Details related to allocations and admissions through CSAS(UG) etc. will be notified separately. Candidate must visit admission.uod.ac.in on regular basis. For admission to University of Delhi, it is mandatory for the candidate to appear in CUET (UG) - in those subjects in which s(he) is appearing/has passed Class XII. Only the scores obtained in CUET (UG) - will be considered for admissions to the academic year.

- Documents Required:

10th Class Passing Certificate/Marksheet (Date of Birth proof). 12th Class Marksheet and Certificate. CUET UG Admit Card and Scorecard. Character Certificate (recent). Transfer Certificate / Migration Certificate (if from outside Delhi). Category Certificate (SC/ST/OBC-NCL/EWS) if applicable, as described on mlncdu.ac.in. Passport size photographs.

- Application Process:

CUET Registration: Apply for CUET UG on the NTA website. Candidates must appear in subjects closely related to their Class 12 subjects. CSAS Registration: After CUET results, register on the Delhi University CSAS portal. Filling Preferences: Select Motilal Nehru College and preferred Courses on the CSAS portal. Seat Allocation: Allocation is done via multiple rounds based on CUET scores, preference, and seat availability. Admission Finalization: Upon seat acceptance, pay the required fees to lock the seat, as explained in the official admission guidelines.

== Academics ==
=== Courses offered ===
MLNC offers list of various Bachelor Degrees programs in various fields. Admission to these program is done through Common University Entrance Test UG.

==== Undergraduate ====
- B.A. (Hons) Economics
- B.A. (Hons) English
- B.A. (Hons) Hindi
- B.A. (Hons) History
- B.A. (Hons) Political Science
- B.A. (Hons) Sanskrit
- B.A. Programme
- Bachelor of Commerce
- Bachelor of Commerce (Hons)
- B.Sc. Applied Physical Science
- B.Sc. Physical Sciences with Chemistry
- B.Sc. Physical Sciences with Computer
- B.Sc. (Hons) Chemistry
- B.Sc. (Hons) Mathematics
- B.Sc. (Hons) Physics

==== Post-graduate ====
- M.A. Hindi
- M.A. Political Science
- M.Com.

Admissions and teaching of these courses is handled at the university level. Tutorials are held in the college.

=== Library ===
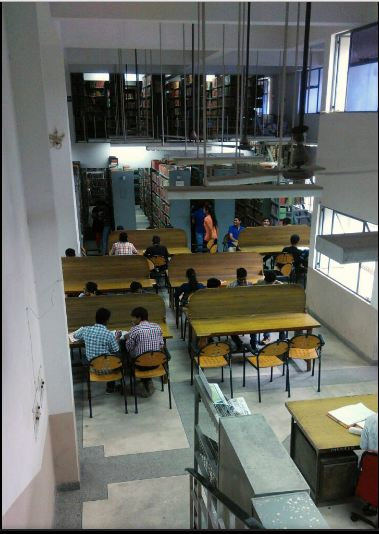
Library of the college

The library has a collection of over 107,586 volumes of books and subscribes to 86 periodicals. The library has 21 computer stations with Internet access. It is a single storey building, which is scattered in a very large space. It is one of the libraries of Delhi University. A stationery shop and xerox facility are also available within the campus.

=== Faculties/Departments ===
Science Faculty :

- Department of Physics
- Department of Chemistry
- Department of Mathematics

Arts Faculty:

- Department of English
- Department of Hindi
- Department of Sanskrit
- Department of Political Science
- Department of History
- Department of Economics

Commerce Faculty:

- Department of Commerce

Physical Education:

- Department of Physical Education,

which attract students from all over the country. Recently, the college introduced a new facility for movie screenings, called Bioscope. A new computer lab and seminar room have been constructed.

=== Exchange programmes ===
In the 2007-08 session, the college participated in exchange program with Pusan University of Foreign Studies, Korea which was appreciated by the Delhi government.

=== Research ===
The college conducts research across a range of disciplines, including physics, mathematics, chemistry, and other fields. Research is carried out through its academic departments, faculty members, research groups, and laboratories.

=== Workshops & conference ===
- In 2026 Dept. Of Physics Organised a Digital Conference on Nanoparticles and Nanotechnology and In 2025 the Department of Physics organised Workshop of latex.
- In 2006 the Department of History organized a national seminar/workshop on "Exploring Delhi", which was a huge success, getting recognition from the Prime Minister and the President of India.
- In 2007 the department produced four first divisioners in the History honours course. The history department has turned out to be one of the known faces of the university. In 2007, it was named Antiquity by the department and since then many national seminars and films screenings have been organised.

== Student life ==
=== Phoenix ===
Phoenix, the annual cultural festival of MLNC College. The three-day festival attracts students from all across India. The USP of the festival are its professional shows, including the Rock Show and Artist Concerts. Apart from this it holds competitions in Dramatics, Dance, Music, Fine Arts, Literary etc. etc. and Singers like Alfaaz,Renuka Panwar,Sidhu Moosewala and Many more.The festival is organized by Students' Union in collaboration with VAAYU - The Cultural Society.[10]

=== Annual student events ===
Orientation: Introduction to the college, departments, faculty, societies, and campus life.

Student Union elections

Department Freshers: Freshers' programmes organized by individual departments.

Society Auditions: Recruitment and auditions for student clubs and societies.

Society orientation & flashmob

Udbhav Annual freshers' event welcoming newly admitted students through cultural programmes and student activities.

Department Fest: Academic and cultural festivals organized by departments.

Jashn Annual Diwali Mela

Annual Fests : Mentioned above more Phoenix.

Annual Sports Event

Farewell: Departmental and college-wide events marking the graduation of final-Year students.

=== Student representation ===
Student's Union The student of the college play the roles of active members of DUSU and the campus witness a rampant campaigning during the election season in September. Some of its students have managed to secure tickets at the DUSU elections.

=== Student publication ===
The college magazine Annual College Magazine namedNavagat publishes reviews of educational, cultural, social and sports activities of the college and articles by the students and staff. The Monthly College Updates Includes Newsletter and more named MLNC Chronicles by Media Cell.

=== Sports & co-curricular ===
Motilal Nehru College (MLNC) offers a sports culture with facilities that promote physical fitness, teamwork, and competitive spirit. Include:

- Sports (Basketball,Volleyball,Badminton,Football, Kabaddi, Boxing, Chess, Carrom and Table Tennis)
- Stadium/grounds-(Football Ground Basketball Court Badminton Court Volleyball Court)
- Sports Support :

Students are guided by experienced physical education instructors and have access to sports trials and coaching. The college encourages participation in Delhi University inter- college tournaments and often sees representation at the state and national levels.

=== Societies and clubs ===
Departmental Society: Debating:(2)

- Abhivyanjana-English Debsoc & Literary Society
- Abhivyanjana-Hindi Debsoc & Literary Society
- Nitigya-Political Science Society
- Anusandhan-Physics Society
- Quimica - Chemistry Society
- Dimension - Mathematics Society
- Combrosia - Commerce Society

Govt Approved Initiative:

- National Service Scheme
- NCC

Other Society/Club/Cell:

- The Media Cell is a student-led body that supports the college administration through social media management, event coverage, photography, videography, graphic design, student publications and digital communications,Alumni Connect & more.
- The Placement Cell-TPC
- E-Cell
- Skill Development Cell
- Navprerna-Competative Exam Society
- Women's Develooment Cell
- Gandhi Study Circle
- Ambedkar Study Circle
- Mental Health Society.
- 180-DC Consulatncy Society
- Enactus
- Tedx
- Markult-Marketing Society
- Sports Society

Cultural Society:

- Aadhar Dramatics Society — theatre and stage productions
- Malhaar Music Society — vocal and instrumental music
- Electra Western Dance society
- Jhankar Classical Dance
- Bellissimo The Fashion society
- Kirtirang Fine Arts Society — painting, design and visual arts

and Many more.

=== Cultural activities ===
The college has an active cultural society which has won various competitions at the university and national level in the past years, including with institutes like IIT Bombay, IIT Kanpur, IIT Delhi, BITS Pilani, and Delhi University NEXUS. Moti Lal Nehru College was one of the nine colleges which participated in the Sahitya Akadami's poetry competition.

Aadhaar is the dramatics society of the college. The Electra dance society, Malhar music society and Bellissimo The fashion society are other notable societies active in the college.

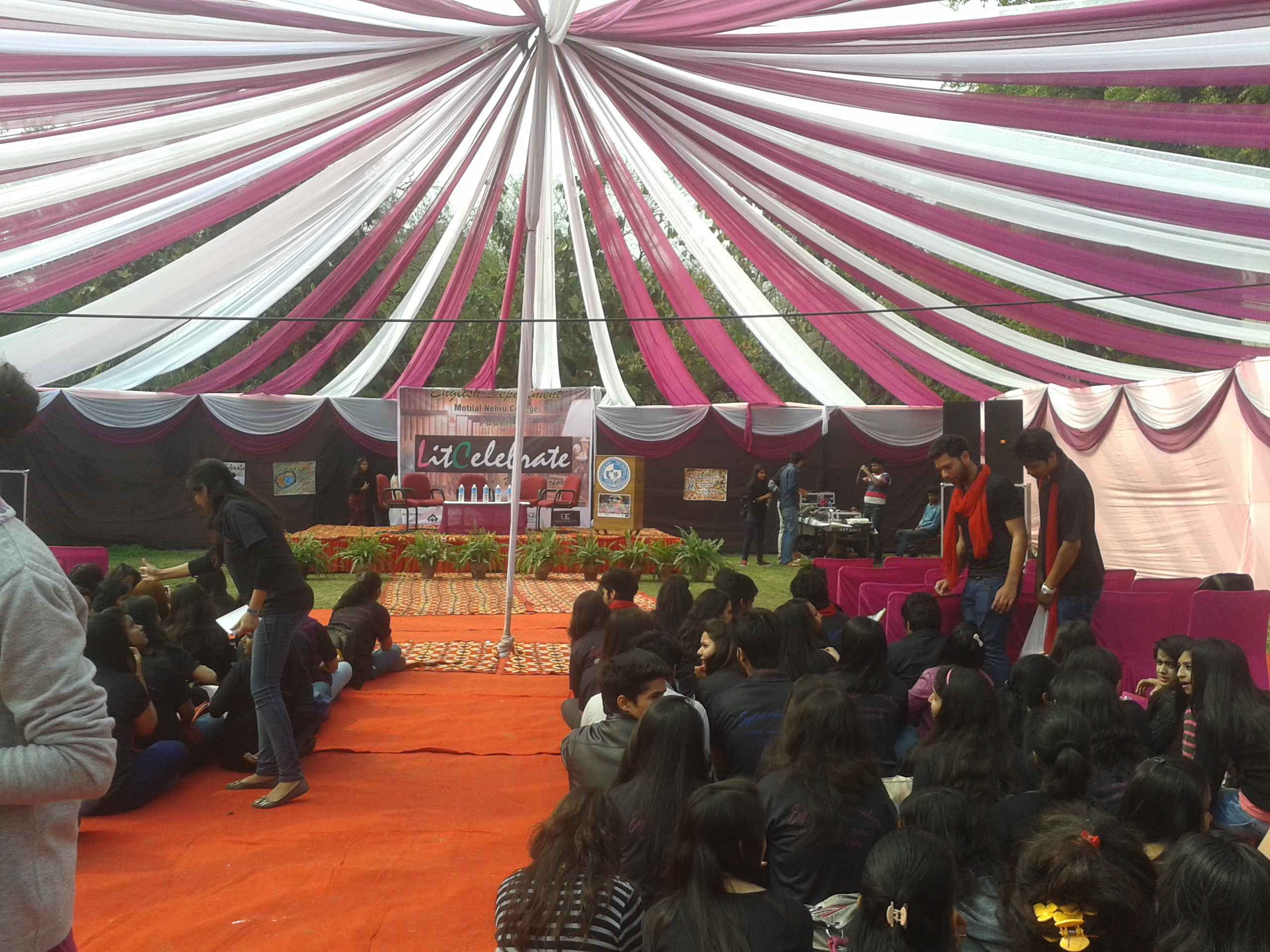
Lit Celebrate, the English Department Fest 2014

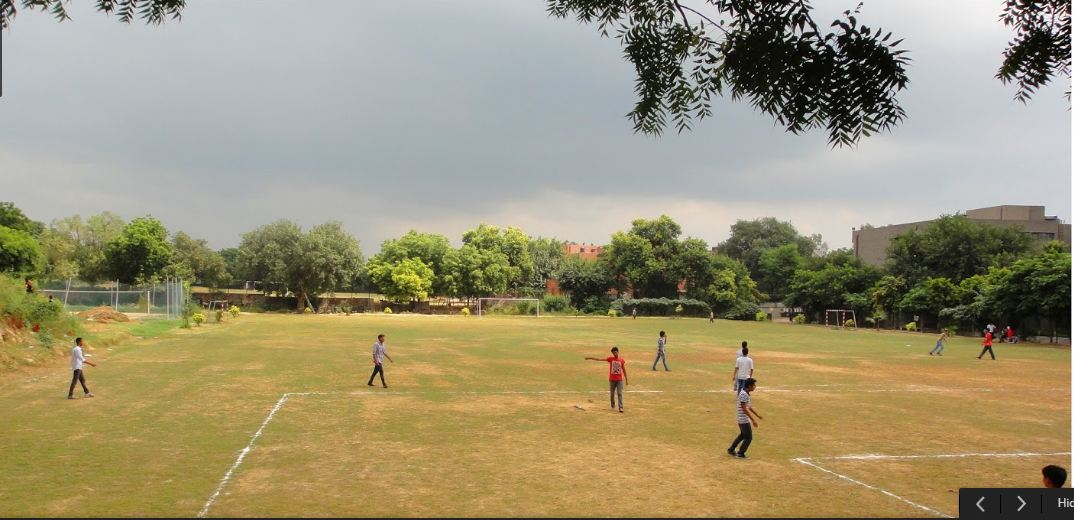
College Playground

== Notable alumni ==
Alumuni called as MLNCian/MNCites

=== Athlete ===
- Praveen Kumar (Para athlete), Silver medalist (Men's high jump T64)

=== Politics ===
- Karan Singh Tanwar, MLA, Delhi Cantt., New Delhi
- Sat Prakash Rana, MLA, Delhi

=== Artist & Media ===
- Papon, playback singer
- Shambhu Shikhar, Poet, Comedian

== See also ==
- Lady Shri Ram College
- Jesus and Mary College
- Hansraj College
