= Pannalal Girdharlal Dayanand Anglo Vedic College =

College in Delhi

- Motto: असतो मा सद्गमय (asato mā sadgamaya) (Sanskrit)
- Motto in English: "From Ignorance Lead me to Truth"
- Type: College
- Established: 1957; 69 years ago
- Affiliations: University of Delhi
- Chairman: Sh Ajay Suri
- Principal: Prof. Darvinder Kumar (Morning college); Prof. Harindri Chaudhary (Evening college)
- Undergraduates: B.Sc, B.Com, B.A
- Postgraduates: M.A, M.Com
- Location: Ring Road, near Vinobapuri Metro Station, Nehru Nagar, Lajpat Nagar, (India) , Delhi, 110065, India; 28.5672882°N 77.249792°E
- Campus: Urban
- Acronym: PGDAV
- Colors
- Nickname: PGDAV College
- Website: pgdavcollege.in (Morning-shift) pgdavecollege.in (Evening-shift)

Pannalal Girdharlal Dayanand Anglo-Vedic (P.G.D.A.V.) College is a constituent college of the University of Delhi. Established in 1957, it offers various courses at the undergraduate, postgraduate level and open schooling. As per NIRF 2025 Rankings, P.G.D.A.V. College ranks amongst the top 100 colleges of the country.

P.G.D.A.V College is a part of the South Campus of Delhi University. The College is situated in Nehru Nagar, near Vinobapuri metro station, in Delhi. The College complex has two seminar halls, three Computer Centres, a Bank, a library, laboratories for various departments, and playgrounds for Cricket, Football, Badminton, Basketball, Volleyball, Girls common room, medical room and also a gymnasium. The college is named after Pannalal Girdharlal who extended financial support and land to D.A.V. College Managing Committee for establishment of the college.

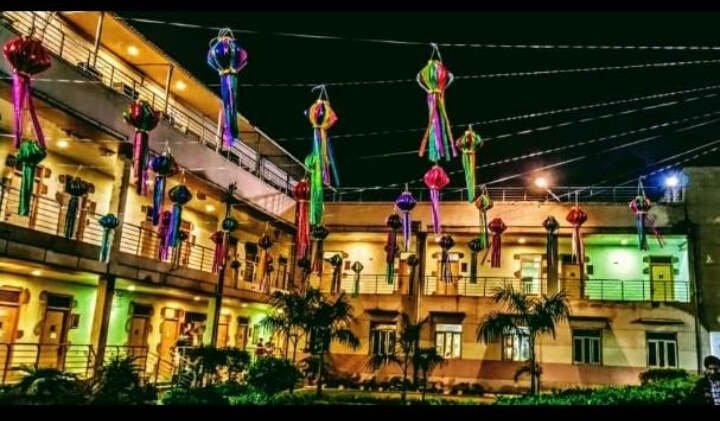
College evening photo

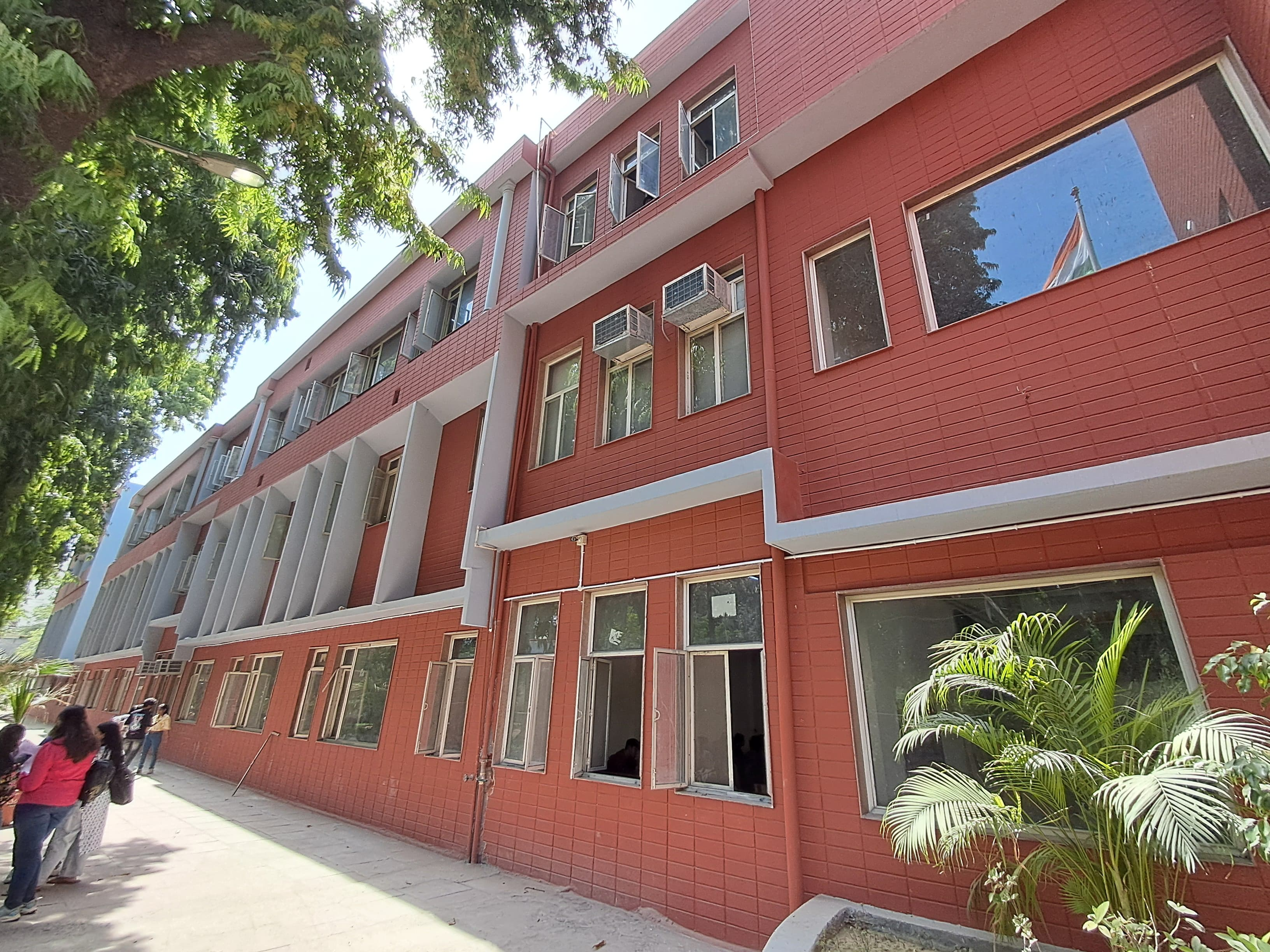
Part of the Facade of the PGDAV College building.

About Principal of the College: Prof. (Dr.) Darvinder Kumar is currently serving as the Principal and a Professor of Statistics at P.G.D.A.V. College, a prominent institution affiliated with the University of Delhi. He assumed the role of Principal on May 1, 2025, after briefly serving as the college's Vice-Principal. He is the Member-Secretary of the PGDAV College Governing Body. His primary research interests includes Queueing Theory, Stochastic Models and Computer Networks. Recent Milestones: Under his administrative leadership, P.G.D.A.V. College recently secured the prestigious Vice- Chancellor Trophy in the Men's Section for the first time in the history of the institution.

== Departments ==
The college has twelve Departments which offers B.Sc. / B.A. / B.Com. Honours as well as B.Sc. / B.A. / B.Com. Programme Courses.

List of Departments:

- Economics
- Computer Science
- Commerce
- English
- Hindi
- History
- Statistics
- Mathematics
- Physical Education
- Environmental Studies
- Political Science
- Sanskrit

== Cultural Societies/Cells of the Morning Shift ==
- "The Placement Cell" facilitates campus placements, seminars and internship opportunities for the students of the college. It organises the annual internship fair "CONVERGE" which acts as a platform for students across Delhi University colleges to avail internship opportunities. More than 50+ companies turn up for the event with a footfall of around 2000 students from across DU colleges.
- "Hyperion". It resembles the cultural diversity in its structure, being composed of multiple different societies, including:
- Information Technology Society: "Tech-Wiz" was established in year 2013. Members of Tech-Wiz deals with all technical projects for P.G.D.A.V. College.
- The Photography Society: "IRIS- The Film and Photography Society"
- The Theatre and Film Making Society: "Navrang" has been awarded with the P.G.D.A.V Society of the year award for its amazing performance during the year 2016–17. Its most famous play "JAN-E-MAN" won 32 awards in total across delhi and also won 1st prize at Mood Indigo –The annual cultural fest of IIT Bombay. It also won best production award at Sahitya Kala Parishad's annual theatre fest.
- Dramatics Society: "Rudra" with its famous street play "YEH GANDI BAAT HAI" won the prize for the best play at 2012 IIT MUMBAI festival – Mood Indigo, second best play at Kamla Nehru college, 3rd best play at Dyal Singh evening college, best play at Jamia Millia Islamia and second best play at Faculty of Management Studies. The Society came into controversy with its play 'Dilli Desh Hai' in 2011 pointing out the flaws in federal funding structure of India, which focused on metros and big cities at cost of smaller cities and towns.
- "Rapbeats"-"The Hip Hop Music Society" is the only Hip Hop Music Society in the whole of Delhi University.
- "Impressions": the impact on the cultural arts society, which is responsible for decoration in all the events held within the College major or minor be it the cultural fest or freshers talent hunt.
- Indian Music Society: "Raagaa"
- Dance Society: "SPUNK" – morning "RIEVA" – evening
- Intellectual Society: "Chanakya" The Intellectual Society is one of the prominent societies of Hyperion, which in itself holds 4 different societies, including:
  - The Grey Matter: Debating Society As the name resembles it means matters which cannot be classified under the stereotyped 'black' or white and holds debatable aspects
  - Buzzer: (Quiz Society)
  - Qaafiya: A poetry forum was started in the year 2011.
  - Western Music Society: "Conundrum" secured the first prize in the college band competition at Mood Indigo 2013 (IIT Bombay) apart from having won prizes at many other colleges including Kirori Mal College, Faculty of Law (Delhi), Dyal Singh College, SGND Khalsa College and JIMS (Rohini) the very same year.

== Notable alumni ==
- Amarjit Chopra - Ex-President, Institute of Chartered Accountants of India
- Sanjay Jain - Former Additional Solicitor General of India
- Virat Bhatia - Managing Director, Apple India
- Manoj Prabhakar – Former cricketer
- Dheeraj Verma – Comic book artist/creator
- Arvind Babbal – Director and producer
- Vijay Raaz – Actor
- Parvinder Awana – Former cricketer
- Shrikant Sharma - Politician
- Atul Wassan, Former cricketer
- Kartik Rawal - Digital Marketer and Business Analyst

== See also ==
- Arya Samaj
- Education in India
- Literacy in India
- List of institutions of higher education in Delhi
