= Aryabhatta College =

College in Delhi, India

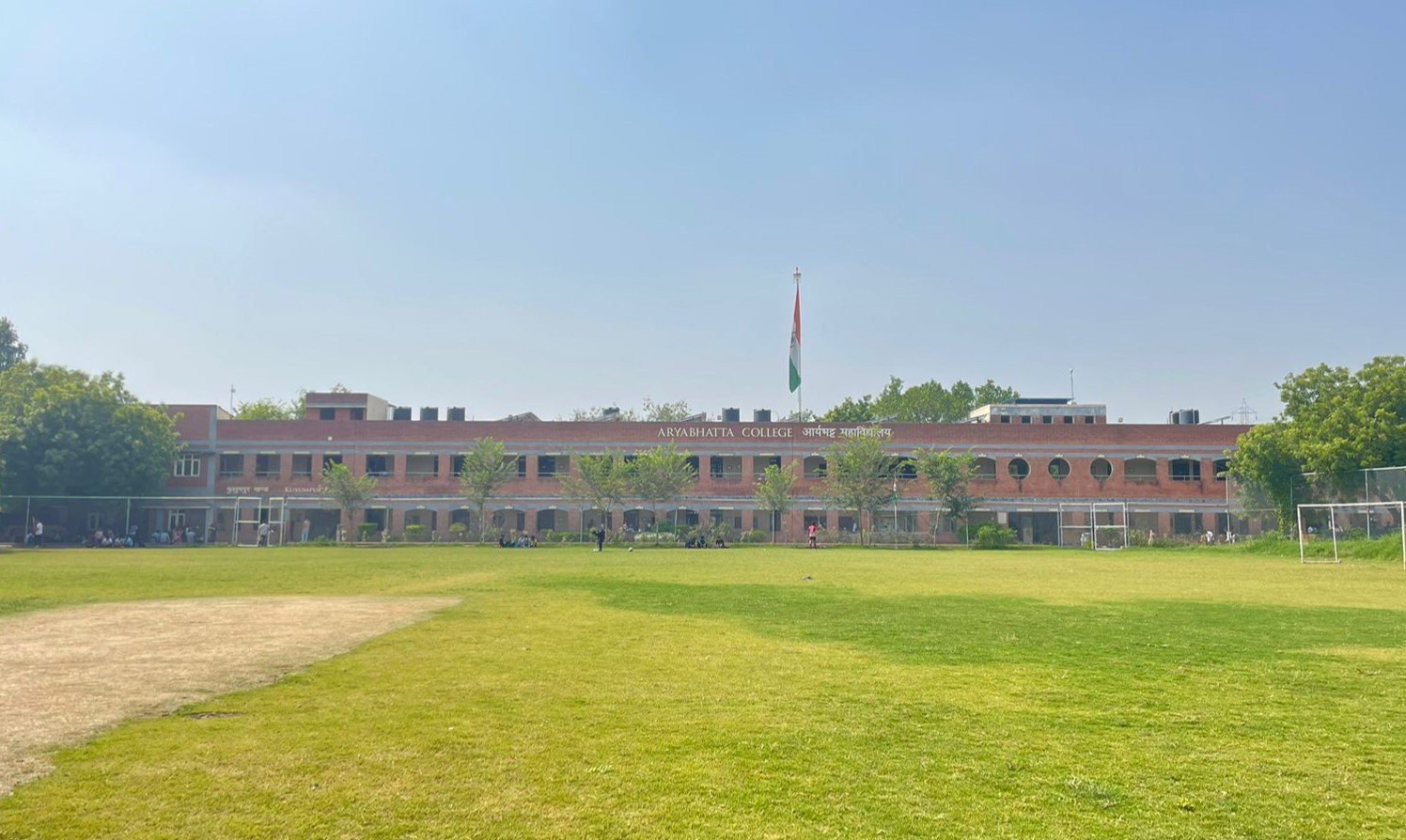
- Kusumpur Block (RLA) of Aryabhatta College.
- Motto: ज्ञानं विज्ञानं समुब्दोंधनम् “Knowing, Comprehending and Awakening”
- Type: Public
- Established: 2014 ; 12 years ago
- Accreditation: NAAC (A+ Grade)
- Affiliations: University of Delhi
- Chairperson: Vasu Trivedi
- Principal: Prof. Manoj Sinha
- Academic staff: 124
- Students: 2200
- Location: Benito Juarez Road, Delhi-110021 (India), Delhi, India; 28.5806472°N 77.1616156°E
- Campus: Urban
- Website: www.aryabhattacollege.ac.in

Aryabhatta College is a NAAC accredited A+ college fully maintained by University of Delhi and named after the ancient Indian mathematician Aryabhatta. The college is located in South Delhi at Benito Juarez Marg, South Campus. It awards degrees under the University of Delhi and offers 15 courses at the undergraduate level in humanities, commerce and science streams. There are around 2200 students on the rolls of the college.

== History ==
Aryabhatta College, formerly known as Ram Lal Anand College (Evening) became a full-fledged morning college from the academic session 2014–15. Ram Lal Anand College (Evening) was established in 1973 when the University of Delhi took over the college from the Trust that managed the Ram Lal Anand college. The Trust was set up in 1964 by a philanthropist and legal luminary Late Sh. Ram Lal Anand, a senior advocate in the Supreme Court of India, to impart education at the university level.

== Campus ==
The college has a lush green campus. It is adjacent to the South Campus of the University of Delhi in the surroundings of the South Delhi section of the Aravalli Range. The Campus consists of two blocks - Kusumpur (RLA) and Taregana with classrooms, auditorium and a seminar room. And a new academic block is under-construction. The college does not have its own separate playground, it uses a playground of Ram Lal Anand College for sports. Various games like volleyball, cricket, football, kabaddi are organised under the supervision of the Director of Physical Education. The college has a well-equipped computer lab, NCC and NSS rooms, silent study hall, students' utility centre, girls common room and photocopier. The college also has a newly constructed canteen.

== Organisation and administration ==
=== Departments ===
- Department of Business Economics
- Department of Commerce
- Department of Computer Science
- Department of Economics
- Department of English
- Department of Hindi
- Department of History
- Department of Mathematics
- Department of Political Science
- Department of Psychology
- Department of Management Studies

== Academics ==
=== Undergraduate programmes ===
The college offers following courses:

- B.A(H) Business Economics
- B.Com
- B.Com(H)
- B.A(H) Economics
- B.A(H) English
- B.A(H) Political Science
- B.A(H) Hindi
- B.A. Programme (Political Science)
- B.A. Programme (History)
- Bachelor in Management Studies(BMS)
- B.A (H) Psychology
- B.A (H) History
- B.Sc (H) Mathematics
- B.Sc (H) Computer Science

=== Library ===
The college has a library. The library is open to bonafide students of all classes. All important textbooks are kept in the reserve section to enable students to write their tutorials. It has more than one lakh books and 2000+ eJournals. There is a reading room, which subscribes to many dailies, weeklies, periodicals and journals on a variety of subjects. The college library also provides a facility of Book Bank to the economically weaker members of the college.

== Student life ==
=== Hostel ===
At present, the college does not provide hostel accommodation to its students. However, many private accommodations are available in the vicinity of the college.

=== Student societies ===
Every department has its own society which is tasked with organising the department-specific co-curricular activities.

A number of student societies function in the college. There are 21 societies and cells active in the college. The purpose of these societies is to provide opportunities to students for self-expression and training. They also help in all-around development lege also hosts and conducts seminars, debates, cultural programmes etc. to encourage creative activities among the students.

=== Departmental Societies ===
- Arahata, the B.A. Programme Society
- Business Economics Society
- Srijan, the Psychology Society
- Commerce Society
- English Society
- Hindi Society
- History Society
- Parisā, Political Science Society
- Mind Over Matter, Economics Society
- TechPioneers, Computer Science Society
- Mathematics Society
- Sankalp, the BMS society

=== Extra-curricular societies ===
- ZeroHour - The Debating Society
- Nibs and Brushes - The Art Society
- Rangmanch - The Theatre Society
- The Heritage Society and SPICMACAY
- Musafir - Adventure and Nature Society
- PICWIC - The Photography Society
- Wavetrix - The Western Dance Society
- Laasya - The Indian Dance Society
- Virtuoso - The Music Society
- Abhivyakti- Podcasting Society
- Techpioneers-Computer science society

=== Other societies ===
- Prashnottare, the Quiz Club
- Swavalamban, the Startup Club
- CDF Aryabhatta
- Enactus Aryabhatta
- Eartha Aryabhatta Chapter
- Finance and Investment Cell
- The Placement and Internship cell
- The Marketing Cell
- E-Cell: The Entrepreneurship Cell
- Ikshana - The Animal Care Society
- Environment Study Circle
- Gandhi Study Circle
- Film Appreciation Club
- National Cadet Corps (NCC)
- National Service Scheme (NSS)
- North-East Students' Society

== See also ==
- Education in India
- Education in Delhi
- University of Delhi
- List of institutions of higher education in Delhi
