= Mata Sundri College for Women =

Constituent college of University of Delhi

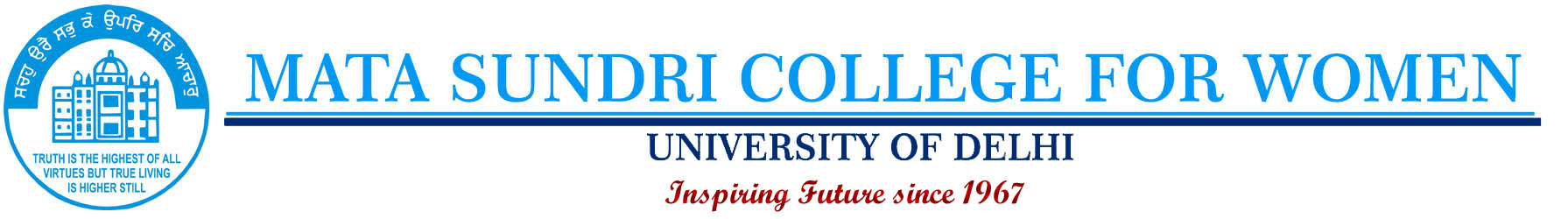
- Established: 1967
- Founders: Gurudwara Prabhandak Committee, Delhi State
- Academic affiliations: University of Delhi
- Principal: Dr. Harpreet Gaur
- Location: Mata Sundari Lane, Mandi House, Central Delhi, Delhi, 110002, India; 28.6332521°N 77.2330018°E
- Campus: Urban
- Website: mscw.ac.in
- Location within Delhi Location within India

Mata Sundri College for Women also shortly known as Mata Sundari College is a constituent college of University of Delhi. The college was founded in 1967 by Delhi Sikhs Gurudwara Management Committee. At present 4000+ students are enrolled in various Certificate, Diploma, undergraduate and Postgraduate courses available in the college. The college is located in the central Delhi and comes under the jurisdiction of the North Campus of University of Delhi. It is named after Mata Sundari, wife of tenth Sikh guru Guru Gobind Singh and is located adjacent to Mata Sundri Gurdwara.

== History ==
The college began with 21 faculty members in 1967. Several new courses, such as B.A. (Hons.) in Punjabi, Hindi, Sanskrit, History, Political Science, and Philosophy were added in 1968 and 1969. Postgraduate courses in Punjabi and Sanskrit were introduced in 1976 and 1978, respectively, further diversifying the academic offerings. Additional courses, including B.A. (Hons.) in Mathematics and B.Com. (Pass), were introduced in 1978.

== Courses Offered ==
The college offers various undergraduate and postgraduate courses.

=== Undergraduate courses ===
- Humanities

B.A. (Hons) English B.A. (Hons) Hindi B.A. (Hons) History B.A. (Hons) Philosophy B.A. (Hons) Political Science B.A. (Hons) Psychology B.A. (Hons) Punjabi B.A. (Hons) Sanskrit B.A. Programme

- Commerce

B.Com. B.Com. (Hons) B.El.Ed. B.Sc. (Hons) Mathematics

=== Add on Certificate/Diploma Courses ===
a. Part Time Certificate/Diploma/Advance Diploma:- Computer and its Applications Textile Designing Travel and Tourism b. Certificate Courses in Foreign Languages:- French German Spanish

== Facilities ==
The college houses a large and spacious library.

== Transport ==
ITO metro station is about 1 km from college campus.

== Security issues ==
College students have expressed concerns about safety with cases of stalking by men being reported.

== See also ==
- Education in India
- Literacy in India
- List of institutions of higher education in Delhi
