= Shivaji College =

Constituent College of University of Delhi in India

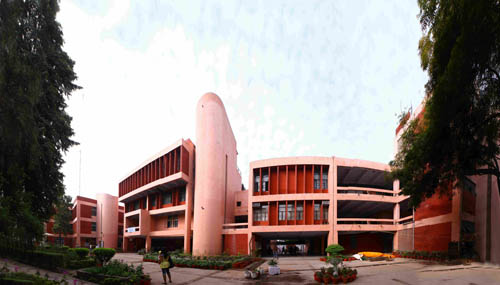
- Shivaji College
- Motto: "Amritam tu vidya (अमृतं तु विद्या)"
- Motto in English: True knowledge is the path to immortality.
- Type: College
- Established: 1961; 65 years ago
- Founder: Panjabrao Deshmukh
- Affiliations: University of Delhi
- Principal: Prof. Virender Bhardwaj
- Students: 4500
- Location: Raja Garden, Ring Road, West Delhi, Delhi, 110027, India
- Campus: 10 acres (4.0 ha); Off Campus (University of Delhi)
- Website: www.shivaji.du.ac.in

Shivaji College is a constituent college of the University of Delhi. It offers degrees in various subjects at both undergraduate and postgraduate levels.

== History ==
Shivaji College was established in 1961 in West Delhi by the Dr Panjabrao Deshmukh, The college was established to provide education in what was a largely rural area.

This college infrastructure includes a library, over 78,000 books, and e-journals and e-books through the Delhi University Library System (DULS).

== Academics ==
=== Academic programmes ===
Within the constraints of prescribed syllabi, this college attempts to offer an eclectic selection, a range of options for students.

- B.A. (H): Business Economics, English, History, Hindi, Political Science, Sanskrit, Economics, Geography
- B.A. Programme
- B.Com (H)
- BSc. (H) Mathematics, Botany, Physics, Biochemistry
- M.A. Hindi, Political Science, Sanskrit

=== Rankings ===
The college is ranked 49th among colleges in India by the National Institutional Ranking Framework (NIRF) in 2024.

University rankings

General – India
- NIRF (Colleges) (2024): 49

== Notable alumni ==
- Mr O.P. Wadhwa, a leading lawyer
- Mr Harbhajan Singh, a leading exporter
- Major Y.S. Gehlot, Army Officer
- Mr Sachin Bhamba, General Secretary of an NGO named SPACE
- Dr Naresh Sood, a cancer surgeon
- Dr Navdeep Chhabra, a renowned urologist
- Mr Vivek Chaudhary, IES
- Tanya Maniktala, Actress

== See also ==
- Shaheed Bhagat Singh College, Delhi
- St. Stephen's College, Delhi
- Hans Raj College, Delhi
- Shri Ram College of Commerce, Delhi
- Miranda House, University of Delhi, Delhi
- Loyola College, Chennai, University of Madras
- Narsee Monjee College of Commerce and Economics, Mumbai
- St. Xavier's College, Mumbai, University of Mumbai, Mumbai
- Education in India
- List of institutions of higher education in Delhi
- Kirori Mal College
- Lady Shri Ram College
