= Delhi Sports University =

University in Delhi, India

- Type: Public
- Established: 2020; 6 years ago
- Affiliations: UGC
- Chancellor: Lieutenant Governor of Delhi
- Vice-Chancellor: Dr. Karnam Malleswari
- Location: Delhi, India
- Website: dsu.ac.in

Delhi Sports University (DSU), established in 2020, is a state sports University in Delhi, India. Sports facilities sharing model has been followed for the operation of this university. This university will run and administer different Delhi Sports School to build a good sportsman. This university offers different sports related courses, namely, Sports Medicine, Sports Technology, Sports Businesses & Sports Events, and Media Management. This university also provide training to students for olympic sports.
