= Kalindi College =

College of the University of Delhi

- Official seal of the college
- Motto: ज्ञानं शीलं धर्मश्‍चैव भूषणं”
- Motto in English: The Real Ornaments are Knowledge, Modesty and Sense of Duty
- Type: Public Women's
- Established: 1967
- Affiliations: University of Delhi
- Principal: Prof. Meena Charanda
- Location: Block 49, East Patel Nagar,, West Delhi, Delhi, 110008, India; 28.648467°N 77.1774071°E
- Campus: Urban
- Colors
- Website: kalindi.du.ac.in
- Location within Delhi Location within India

Kalindi College (Hindi: कालिंदी कॉलेज) is an all-girls' college of the University of Delhi. Its motto is 'ज्ञानं शीलं धर्मश्‍चैव भूषणं' (transl. The Real Ornaments are Knowledge, Modesty and Sense of Duty). It has a small, 8.25 acre, non-residential campus located in East Patel Nagar, West Delhi.

== History ==
The college had a beginning as ‘Government College Devnagar’; within a year the college was shifted to the present location, again a Government School building, in East Patel Nagar.

The College initially offered undergraduate programme courses in Humanities and Pure Sciences. Honours courses in Humanities were introduced in 1971, followed by programme courses in Commerce in 1977. Honours courses in Sciences, beginning with physics, were introduced in 1990; followed by mathematics & computer science in 1992 & 1997 respectively.

A professional course of English-language Journalism was introduced in 1995, making Kalindi one of seven DU colleges to offer the course. In 1998, Commerce courses were also upgraded to Honours. Postgraduate Courses in Political Science (1987), Hindi (1991) and Sanskrit (1992) were also added in the tail end of the last century.

Recently Honours courses in Botany, Zoology, Chemistry and Geography have been introduced.

== Degrees offered ==
=== Undergraduate ===
- Bachelor of Arts (Hons./Programme)
- Bachelor of Commerce (Hons./Programme)
- Bachelor of Science
- Bachelor of Vocational (Web Designing)
- Bachelor of Technology (Discontinued)

=== Postgraduate ===
- Master of Arts

== Notable alumni ==
- Mayawati Chief minister of Uttar Pradesh

== See also ==
- Education in India
- Literacy in India
- List of institutions of higher education in Delhi
