= Deen Dayal Upadhyaya College =

Constituent college of University of Delhi

Deen Dayal Upadhyaya College (DDUC)
- दीन दयाल उपाध्याय कॉलेज
- Official seal of college
- Other name: DDUC
- Motto: सत्यमेव जयते
- Motto in English: Truth Alone Triumphs
- Type: Public
- Established: 1990
- Academic affiliations: University of Delhi
- Principal: Hem Chand Jain
- Undergraduates: 1800
- Postgraduates: 110
- Location: Delhi, India; 28°36′21.04″N 77°02′17.46″E
- Campus: urban
- Website: dducollegedu.ac.in

Deen Dayal Upadhyaya College (DDUC) (Hindi: दीन दयाल उपाध्याय कॉलेज) is one of the top constituent college of the University of Delhi, Delhi, India. Located at Dwarka, Delhi near Netaji Subhas University of Technology. It is fully funded by Government of Delhi. It was established in August 1990 in the memory of Deen Dayal Upadhyaya, a philosopher, thinker and social worker.

== Academics ==
=== Academic programmes ===
The college, informally known as DDUC, offers many undergraduate courses, including BA, B.Sc., and B.Com Honours programs. In order to cater to business and management education at the undergraduate level, a three-year Bachelor of Business Studies was inaugurated on 18 July 2007.

=== Ranking ===
It is ranked 26th among colleges in India by the National Institutional Ranking Framework (NIRF) in 2024.

University rankings

General – India
- NIRF (Colleges) (2024): 26

=== Admissions ===
The admission process for all the courses is done through the Common Seat Allocation System (CSAS) in three phases. Admission for undergraduate courses is done through CUET scores conducted by National Testing Agency.

== Student life ==
=== Cultural festivals ===
The college's student life includes various student organizations (both academic and cultural) that organise extracurricular activities.

Kalrav is the annual festival of DDUC, usually organized in February–March each year. It is a conglomerate of the activities of all societies and departments of the college. Kalrav seeks participation of students pan-India and has events & competitions including those of Music, Dance, Drama, Debating, Model UN, Quizzes and many more informal events. The Star nights at Kalrav in the previous years have witnessed performances by youth icons like Mika, Indian Ocean, The Circus etc.

Ecclesia is the annual convention of Department of Management Studies, DDUC.

Zucitva is the Annual Commerce Festival of DDUC organized by the Department of Commerce every year and includes events like Corporate Fashion Show, Forensic Accounting, Business Plan, Marketing Management Competition, Mock Stock, etc. The fest is organized every year by CommUnity, the Department Of Commerce.

Tech Marathon is the Annual Computer Science Festival of DDUC organized by the Sanganika (The Computer Science Society).

KALAMKAAR the Hindi kavi sammelan was organised in the college on 18 February on the occasion of the silver jubilee year. Under the banner of KALAMKAR, a literature festival named 'KLF' is organised every year, during this festival, the society also organised a mega Kavi-Sammelan.

=== Student societies ===
There are many academic and cultural societies that are open for all DDUC students to join. Some of them include:

- Women Development Cell
- 180 Degrees Consulting DDUC (DDUC branch of the world's largest university-based consultancy)
- TEDxDDUC (TEDx University Event, Delhi University's Deen Dayal Upadhyaya College)
- Enactus DDUC
- Polaroid: The Photography and Filmmaking Society
- Vyaktitva – The Personality Development Society
- Entrepreneurship Development Cell DDUC: The Entrepreneurship Cell that comes under the Department of Management Studies
- Synapses – The Zoological Society (Department of Zoology)
- HCMS - Harish Chandra Mathematics Society ( Department of Mathematics)
- Optizone - The Operational Research Society ( Department of Mathematical Sciences)
- Aryabhatta Science Forum (Department of Physics)
- Zest – Department of English
- Sanganika – the computer science society
- Covalence – Department of Chemistry
- CommUNITY – Department of Commerce
- Kalpavriksha- the botanical society (Department of Botany)
- Delonix – annual festival of the Department of Botany
- Astral- the management society of the Department of Management Studies
- SILIZIUM- Society of Dept. Of Electronics
- Robotics Club
- Vivekananda Study Circle
- National Service Scheme
- Social Responsibility Cell DDUC
- Kalamkaar – the literary society
- Yavanika – the theatre society.
- Sangyaan- the quizzing society
- Voices – the debating society
- Rhapsody – the music society
- The Model UN Club
- Raaga – the dance society
- Fin-S – the finance society
- Eco Club
- TEAM EAGLE 🦅 for Students better future
- Spic Macay
- Reflections – the magazine society
- Career Aspirants Club – the competitive examination preparation club
- Vyoma – the astro club

=== Hostels ===
There are 2 hostels, boys and girls, having 90 limited seats each.

The process of admission into the hostel is different, considering the aggregate of the 12th class of students, along with their distance from homes. Candidates are required to fill out an application form with the Hostel within the scheduled dates as per Notification for Hostel Accommodation.
