= Sri Guru Nanak Dev Khalsa College =

Constituent college of University of Delhi

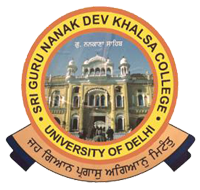
- Former name: Sri Guru Tegh Bahadur Khalsa (Evening) College
- Established: 1973; 53 years ago
- Academic affiliations: University of Delhi
- Principal: Dr. Baljeet Singh
- Location: Block 4, Dev Nagar, Karol Bagh, Central Delhi, Delhi, 110005, India; 28.6549044°N 77.1872338°E
- Campus: Off campus
- Website: sgndkc.org
- Location within Delhi Location within India

Sri Guru Nanak Dev Khalsa College is a constituent college of University of Delhi which offers courses in Commerce and Humanities at undergraduate and postgraduate levels. The College was established in 1973 and is named after first Guru of the Sikhs and functions under the able management of Delhi Sikh Gurudwara Management Committee. The college has been granted minority status by the National Commission for Minority Education institutions. The College is located in Guru Ravi Das Marg, Block 4, Dev Nagar, Karol Bagh, Central Delhi, Delhi 110005.

Previously, it was known as Sri Guru Tegh Bahadur Khalsa College (Evening). It is also popularly known as SGND Khalsa or SGNDK in order avoid confusion with Sri Guru Tegh Bahadur Khalsa College.

== Courses offered ==
- Bachelor of Science (Honors) Mathematics
- Bachelor of Commerce (Honors)
- Bachelor of Commerce (Programme)
- B.A. with Hons in Business Economics
- B.A. with Hons in English
- B.A. with Hons in Hindi
- B.A. with Hons in Hindi Journalism and Mass Communication
- B.A. with Hons in History
- B.A. with Hons in Political Science
- B.A. with Hons in Punjabi
- B.A. Programme
- M.A. (Punjabi)
- M.Com.

== Societies ==
=== Academic societies ===
- Asankh – The Mathematics Society
- Udyamita – The Entrepreneurship Cell
- Vanaj – The Commerce Society
- Kirt – The Economics Society
- Sofica – Society for Financial Literacy & Consumer Awareness
- Vedang – debating and quizzing society
- Encore – The English Society
- Virsa – The History Society
- Civil Society – The Political Science Society
- Hindi Sahitya Sabha
- Punjabi Sahitya Sabha

=== Extracurricular societies ===
- AnC- The Arts & Culture Society
- Asankh - The Mathematics Society
- Certatus- Model United Nations Society
- Photobug – The Photography and Videography Society
- Nepathya – The Dramatics Society
- Vedang – The Debating and Quizzing Society
- Sarbloh warriors – The Gatka Society
- Magus – The Western Dance Society
- Vijyant – The NCC Club
- NSS Wing
- Cyber Clan – The I.T. Society
- Musoc – The Music Society
- Impasto – The Fine Arts Society
- The Bhangra Society

== Annual Fest ==
The College organises an inter-college annual festival "Surlok" every year which witnesses a footfall of thousands of college students from Delhi NCR participating in various competitions including Street Play, Western Dance, Folk Dance, Solo Singing, as well as fun activities like Dubsmash, Blind Date etc. ranging over 3 Days.

== The Annual Convention 2016 ==
In March 2016, the college organised its Annual convention on the theme-" Startup India: The Road Ahead" to promote the entrepreneurial ecosystem among the college students. The Convention witnessed the likes of entrepreneurial pioneers including Dr. Ritesh Malik (Forbes Asia Top 30 under 30 entrepreneur), Sachin Garg (Best Selling Indian Author), Ajay Chaturvedi (Founder, HarVa) and many others.

== Sports ==
Every year, the college organises the Annual Sports Day at Thyagraj Stadium, Delhi which witnesses huge participation from students and the teachers across wide variety of indoor and outdoor games which had been graced by some of the renowned sports personalities including Ms. Asha Aggarwal (Arjuna Awardee, Indian Women Marathon Champion) etc.

== Infrastructure ==
=== College Library ===
The college library not only houses some 74000 books but also subscribes to more than fifty National & International Journals and Magazines.

== See also ==
- Education in India
- Literacy in India
- List of institutions of higher education in Delhi
