= Sri Aurobindo College (Evening) =

Constituent college of the University of Delhi

Sri Aurobindo College, (Evening)
- Motto: तमसो मा ज्योतिर्गमय
- Motto in English: Lead me from Darkness to Light
- Type: Government College
- Established: 1984
- Affiliations: University of Delhi
- Chairperson: Anupam Kumar
- Academic staff: 60
- Undergraduates: 2169
- Location: Block B, Shivalik Colony, Malviya Nagar, South Delhi, Delhi, 110017, India; 28.5331146°N 77.2020371°E
- Campus: Urban
- Language: Hindi, English
- Nicknames: Sace, Saceians
- Website: www.aurobindoe.du.ac.in
- Location within Delhi Location within India

Sri Aurobindo College (Evening) is a co-ed constituent college of the University of Delhi in Delhi, India. The college is a two-minute walk from the Malviya Nagar Metro station.

== Cultural fest ==
The annual fest of Sri Aurobindo College Evening is Exuberance (Sargam), and is an inter-college festival. Exuberance acts as a choir of various musical events, ranging from Sufi to pop and rock-n-roll. Other events include literary events and fashion shows. The festival has seen massive participation by students.

== See also ==
- Education in India
- Literacy in India
- List of institutions of higher education in Delhi
