= Shyama Prasad Mukherji College =

Constituent college of University of Delhi

Shyama Prasad Mukherji College for Women
- Motto: "Tejasvi Navadhitam Astu"
- Motto in English: Let our efforts at learning be luminous and filled with joy, and endowed with the force of purpose
- Type: Public college
- Established: 1969
- Affiliations: University of Delhi
- Principal: Prof Neelam Goel
- Faculty: 177 permanent, 06 Ad Hoc
- Students: 3000 (2017)
- Location: Delhi, India; 28°40′22.31″N 77°7′39.11″E
- Campus: 10 acres (4.0 ha); University of Delhi, Punjabi Bagh (West), Delhi
- Calendar: Semester
- Nickname: SPM
- Website: spm.du.ac.in

Shyama Prasad Mukherji College for Women commonly known as SPM College, is a constituent college of the University of Delhi. The all-women's college was founded in 1969 and named after Syama Prasad Mukherjee.

At present, the college offers 19 programs including three professional courses and running nine Certificate Courses. The college offers Teachers Education Programmes - B.Ed, B.El.Ed, and B.A. B.Ed. Secondary - and is among the few colleges of University of Delhi to offer the course outside the Central Institute of Education (CIE), University of Delhi. The college is a part of North Campus cluster but is located off campus.

== Campus ==
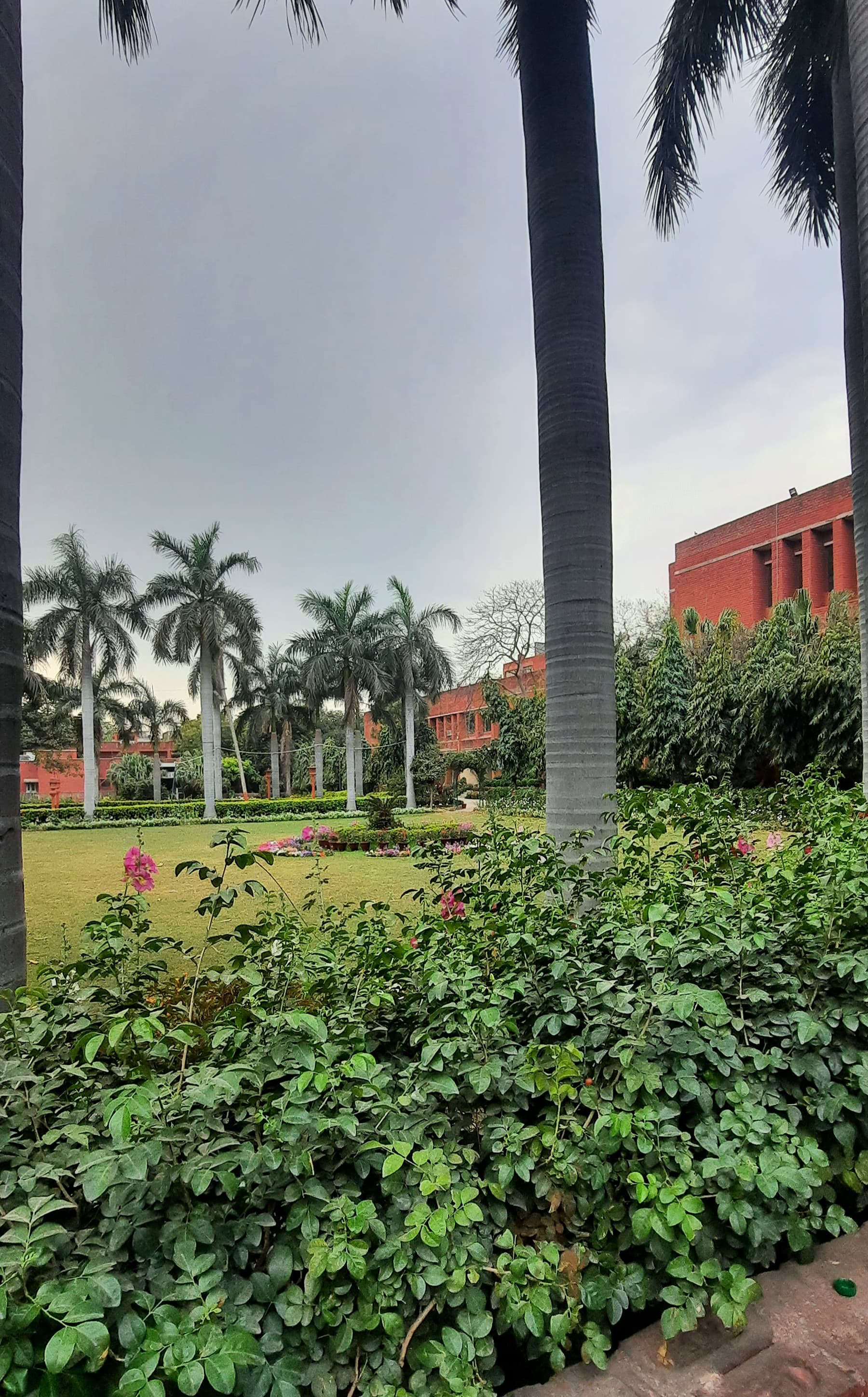

SPM College is located in Punjabi Bagh (West), West Delhi. The college is well connected by the Shivaji Park Metro Station on the Green Line and Punjabi Bagh West Metro station on the Pink Line of the Delhi metro network. Special provisions for disabled students and staff members such as ramps, wheel chairs, washrooms, and special pavements are, in place within the college premises. Braille plates with QR codes are also displayed outside every room.

The college maintains a double storey library in a separate wing for the college students. It is a fully digitalized library with a collection of 87,000 books, 22 journals, 11 newspapers, and reading halls.

A branch of Indian Overseas Bank operates in the college.

The labs, seminar hall, and classrooms are equipped with projectors.

== Governing body ==
According to the provisions of statute 30(1)(c)(i) of Delhi University Act, 1922, the governing body is chosen through public nomination of people from various academic and non-academic backgrounds. There are designated committees, and their management is supervised by the principal. The affairs of the college are jointly managed by the governing body, the academic council, and the executive council of the University of Delhi.

The present Principal (Acting) of the college is Prof. Neelam Goel

== Departments ==
- Applied psychology
- Commerce
- Computer science
- Economics
- Education
- English
- Environmental studies
- Food technology
- Geography
- Hindi
- History
- Human development and family empowerment
- Mathematics
- Music
- Philosophy
- Physical education
- Political science
- Sanskrit
- Sociology

== Academics ==
=== Academic programmes ===
==== Undergraduate courses ====
The college offers the three year Undergraduate Programme of Delhi University in Humanities, Commerce, Computer Science Mathematics, and Social Science.

==== General ====
- B.A. Programme
- B.Com Programme

==== Honours ====
- B.Com (H)
- B.A.(H) Hindi
- B.A.(H) English
- B.A.(H) Sanskrit
- B.A.(H) Political Science
- B.A.(H) History
- B.A.(H) Economics
- B.A.(H) Philosophy
- B.A.(H) Applied Psychology
- B.Sc.(H) Mathematics
- B. Sc. Computer Science
- B.A.(H). Geography

==== Post Graduate Courses ====
- M.A. Hindi
- M.A. Political Science
- M.A. Sanskrit

==== Professional Courses ====
- B.El.Ed
- B.Ed.
- B.A. B.Ed. Secondary (ITEP)

==== Short term courses ====
The short term courses include:

- Certificate Course in Counselling and Psychotherapy
- Textile designing including Tie and Dye; Batik, fabric Painting
- Cutting and Tailoring
- Embroidery
- Dress Designing & Drafting
- Beauty culture
- Secretarial Practice Course (Stenography English)

=== Admission ===
The student demography of SPM is heterogeneous. Admission to the college is undertaken through centralized University admission every year from June to July. Reservations are followed as per government norms in the admission process.

=== Placement ===
The college has an active placement cell which conducts various career-related seminars.

=== Centre ===
Under the EPOCH making Social Thinkers of India programme by the University Grants Commission (UGC), Shyama Prasad Mukherji College has a Gandhi Study Centre, Buddhist Study Centre and Guru Nanak Study Centre - that offer certificate courses.

Besides full-time courses, the college also runs study centres for the Non-Collegiate Women’s Education Board and the School of Open Learning.

== Student life ==
The college conducts activities such as sports, NSS, NCC, and other ECAs. These societies are active throughout the year and organize competitions, seminars, conferences and workshops at the college and inter-college levels.
