= Shaheed Sukhdev College of Business Studies =

Constituent college of University of Delhi in India

- Type: Public college
- Established: 1987; 39 years ago
- Academic affiliations: University of Delhi
- Principal: Dr. Poonam Verma
- Academic staff: 31
- Location: Sector 16, Rohini, Delhi, India
- Website: https://sscbs.du.ac.in/

Shaheed Sukhdev College of Business Studies (SSCBS), previously known as College of Business Studies, is an institute for management studies under Delhi University, India. It is located at Sector 16, Rohini, Delhi. It is named after Sukhdev Thapar, who was a prominent freedom fighter in the pre-independence era. The college was established in 1987 by the Ministry of Human Resource Development as the first institution of a collegiate business school in India to offer management education at the undergraduate level. It is considered the best undergraduate business school in India.

== Academics ==
=== Academic programmes ===
The college offers four academic programmes – three at the undergraduate level and one at the postgraduate diploma level.

- Bachelor of Management Studies (BMS): A three-year undergraduate programme in management, originally offered as the Bachelor of Business Studies (BBS). After the first two years, students may specialise in finance, marketing, human resources, or global business.
- Bachelor of Business Administration (Financial Investment Analysis) [BBA (FIA)]: Introduced in 1999 as the University of Delhi's first undergraduate finance programme, this course develops analytical skills for banking and financial services, investment and fund management, corporate financial management, and financial risk management.
- B.Sc. (Honours) in Computer Science: An undergraduate programme covering core computer science topics such as computer systems architecture, data structures, computer networks, operating systems, algorithms, software engineering, database management, and artificial intelligence.
- Post Graduate Diploma in Cyber Security and Law (PGDCSL): A postgraduate diploma providing training in penetration testing and information security, covering techniques for protecting systems, networks, and data. Admission requires a graduate degree in computer science, information technology, computer applications, software development, or a related field.

SSCBS offers several certificate courses, including FinTech, Data Analytics, Business Intelligence, and Digital Marketing.

=== Ranking ===
SSCBS was ranked #92 among (all) colleges in India by the National Institutional Ranking Framework in 2023 and #1 among Bachelor of Business Administration (BBA) colleges in India by India Today in 2020 and 2021.

== Campus ==
The campus is located on Dr. K.N. Katju Marg, Sector 16, Rohini, Delhi. It covers an area of about 5 acres, with a floor area of approximately 217,800 square feet. The main building has eight floors, including the ground floor, along with basement parking for staff and students. It also houses separate hostels for men and women, with a stated capacity of 88 for men and 78 for women. The college moved to this campus in 2017, relocating from its former site in Vivek Vihar.

== Student life ==
SSCBS has the following student societies:

Society	Description
CBSMUN	Model United Nation Society
Blitz	Dance society
Darkroom	Photography society
Dhwani	Music society
Enactus	Social entrepreneurship society (formerly SIFE)
FinX	Finance society
Fourth Wall Productions	Stage play (dramatics) society
IFSA Network India	India chapter of the International Finance Students' Association
Illuminati	Quizzing society
Institute of Management Accountants (IMA)	SSCBS chapter
Kriti	Fine arts society
Kronos	Technology society
Management Interaction Cell (MIC)	Management/HR interaction society
Parishram	Sports society
Synergy	Corporate events society
The Collegiate Entrepreneurs' Organisation (CEO), Delhi University Chapter	Entrepreneurship society
Verve	Street play society
Yuva	Entrepreneurship cell

=== Placements ===
Campus placements are maintained through a dedicated student team at the Career Development Centre. Some of the reputed companies that recruit from CBS include Bain and Company, McKinsey Knowledge Center, Kearney, CB Richard Ellis, and Ernst & Young.

== Notable alumni ==
- Aditi Arya, Femina Miss India World 2015
- Riya Vij, Indian actress
- Kanu Behl, Indian film director and screenwriter

== See also ==
- List of business schools in India
- Shiksha.com profile
- Collegedunoa profile
