= Satyawati College =

Constituent college of Delhi University, India

- Motto in English: "Lead me from Darkness to Light"
- Type: Public
- Established: 1972
- Accreditation: NAAC (A+ Grade)
- Affiliations: University of Delhi
- Chairperson: Prof. Pamela Singla
- Principal: Prof. Subhash Kumar Singh
- Faculty: 187
- Students: 4,000 +
- Location: Delhi, India
- Campus: (10 acres); Urban
- Website: www.satyawati.du.ac.in

Satyawati College is a constituent college of the University of Delhi, situated in Ashok Vihar, North West Delhi district of Delhi. The college offers both morning and evening classes to a student base of more than 4000, with a permanent teaching staff of around 187. This college comes under the north Campus categorization of University of Delhi.

== History ==
The college was established in 1972 by the Government of Delhi, while the "Evening College" was established in 1973. It is one of the constituent colleges of Delhi University in the North campus in Phase III, Ashok Vihar, Delhi. The college is named after Satyavati Devi, a poet and a participant of Indian freedom movement.

== About ==
The college is now approved on the North campus of University of Delhi and is near to many colleges like SRCC College, Hansraj College, Kirori Mal College etc. The main campus of University of Delhi is five kilometres (3.1 mi) away from the college. Satyawati College is maintained by Delhi Government as well as by Delhi University. The college is also equipped with a Pollution Level Display within its campus.

== Academics ==
=== Academic Programmes ===
Satyawati College offers various courses across commerce, economics, mathematics and languages. These include the following.

- B. Com. (H) / B. Com. (P)
- B.A. Prog. courses
- Economics Hons / Mathematics Hons
- English Hons / Hindi Hons / Sanskrit Hons / Urdu Hons
- History Hons / Political Science Hons
- M.A. (Political Science)

== Societies ==
The college has many regulated and unregulated societies, some of which are featured below.

- CDFSC - Social Entrepreneurship Society
- Corporates - Commerce Society
- Enactus - Social Entrepreneurship Society
- Finova - Finance and Investment Cell
- Prakriti - Environmental Society
- Saksham - Placement Cell and Entrepreneurship Society
- Third Act - Dramatics Society
- Utkarsh - Arts and Culture Society
- Literbugs - English Literary Society
- Cinepat - The Film Society

== Notable alumni ==
- Manoj Bajpayee
- Amit Bhadana
- Anil Jha Vats
