= Ramanujan College =

College in Kalkaji, South Delhi, India

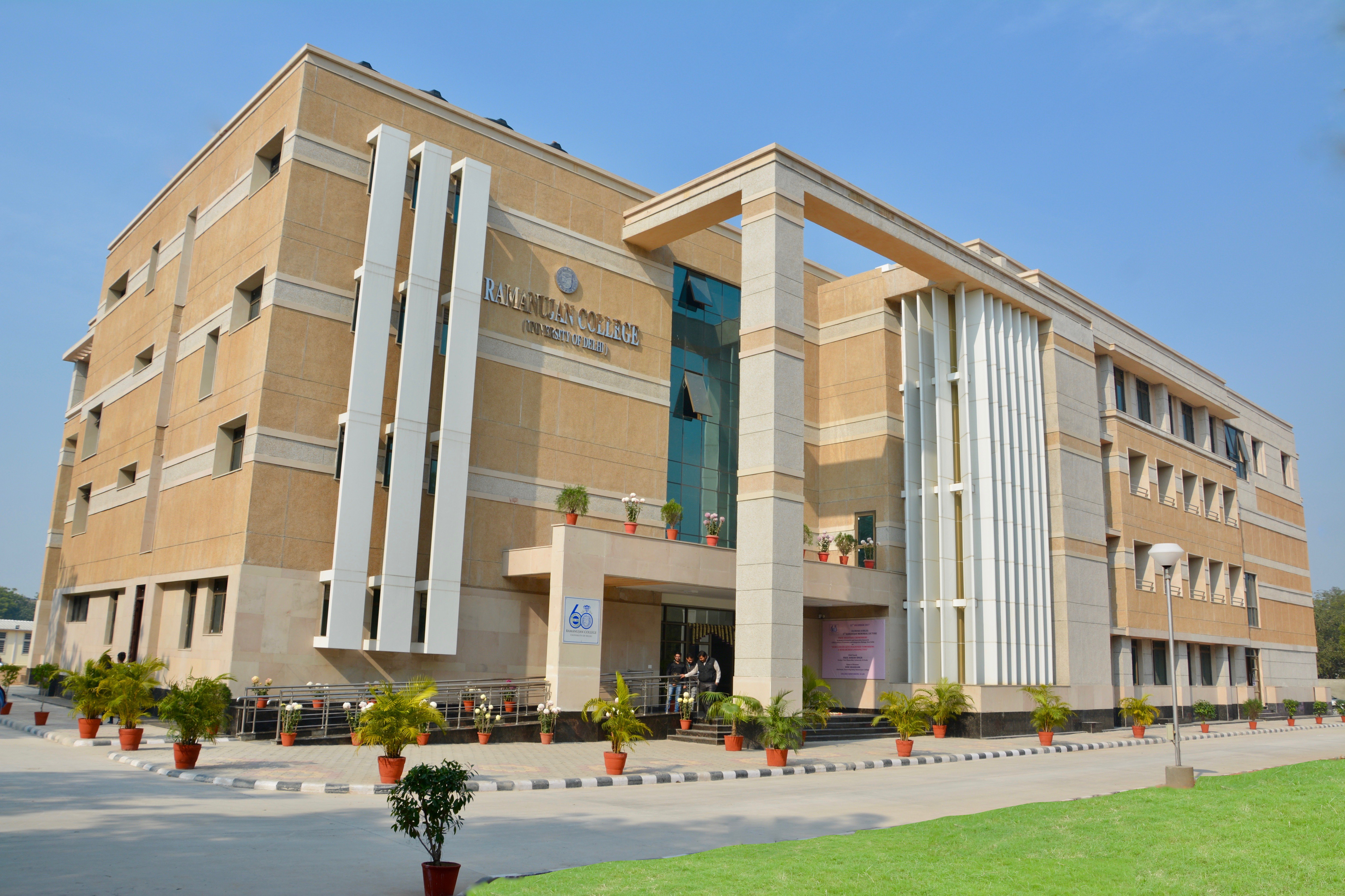
- Building of Ramanujan College, University of Delhi
- Type: Public
- Established: 2010
- Affiliations: University of Delhi
- President: Priyanshu Chaudhary
- Principal: Prof. Rasal Singh
- Location: Delhi, India
- Website: ramanujancollege.ac.in

Ramanujan College is a constituent college of University of Delhi's. It is named after the Indian mathematician Srinivasa Ramanujan. It is located in Kalkaji, near Nehru Place in South East Delhi. The college runs fifteen courses in the disciplines of Humanities, Commerce, Management, Mathematical Sciences, Computer Science and Vocational Studies. It is also the study center for the students of the Non- Collegiate Women's Education Board, University of Delhi and the Indira Gandhi National Open University. Ramanujan College has been accredited grade "A++" by the National Assessment and Accreditation Council (NAAC). Ramanujan College has also been selected by the MHRD as a Teaching Learning Center and National Resource Center.

== History ==
The Ramanujan College, formerly known as Deshbandhu College (Evening) was established in 1958 by the Ministry of Rehabilitation, in the memory of Late Deshbandhu Gupta, a patriot who had dedicated his life to the national freedom struggle. The Deshbandhu College (Evening) operated from the premises of the Deshbandhu College that functioned in the morning hours. Originally run by the Ministry of Rehabilitation and Education as a men's College, Deshbandhu College (Evening) became a co-educational institution in 1994. This college, which is 100% funded by the University Grants Commission has been maintained by the University of Delhi since 1972.

Until the early 90's the College catered to a large number of students who were gainfully employed in the daytime and pursued their studies in the convenience provided by an evening College. During its initial years the College used to function in the late evening hours and developed as a reputed College especially in the field of Commerce studies. Other than B. Com (Honours) and B.Com., the College offered B.A. Programme and Honours courses in English, Hindi and Political Science to its students. The college was also unique because it offered the study of regional languages: Bengali, Punjabi, Sindhi. Late Sindhi scholar Dr. M. L. Jotwani, a member of the college teaching faculty, received the Padma Shri award from the government of India in 2003.

In the year 2010, Deshbandhu College (Evening) was renamed as Ramanujan College, and allocated separate space of seven acres of land within the existing College campus in Kalkaji, South East Delhi. From an evening College it became a full-fledged morning college in 2012.

== Academics ==
=== Undergraduate Courses ===
1. B.Com. (H)
2. B.Com.
3. Bachelor of Management Studies (B.M.S.)
4. B. A. (H) Economics
5. B. A. (H) English
6. B.A. (H) Hindi
7. B. A. (H) Philosophy
8. B. A. (H) Political Science
9. B. A. (H) Applied Psychology
10. B. A. Program
11. B. Sc. (H) Computer Science
12. B. Sc. (H) Mathematics
13. B.Sc. (H) Environmental Science
14. B. Sc. (H) Statistics
15. B. Voc. Banking Operations
16. B.Voc. Software Development

=== Certificate and Diploma Courses ===
1. International Financial Reporting Standards (IFRS)
2. Tally
3. Human Rights
4. Mass Media
5. Radio Jockey and Broadcasting
6. Business Analytics
7. Research and Data Analysis
8. Happiness by The School of Happiness

=== Publications ===
Ramanujan College publishes two journals annually:

1. Ramanujan International Journal of Business and Research (ISSN: 2455-5959) (UGC Listed)
2. International Journal of Applied Ethics (ISSN: 2321-2497).

== College Campus ==
In 2017, a new independent environment-friendly building of the college has been constructed with state of art class-rooms, laboratories, staff rooms and an auditorium. The new building is supported by a gigantic service centre with provision of a sewage treatment plant, solar panels, water harvesting plant, electric sub-station and power generators. Some key features of the college campus are:

- Clean & Green Campus with uninterrupted Electricity & Water Supply
- ICT enabled Smart Classrooms with Projectors
- Multiple Computer Labs with latest Hardware & Software with 1500 Desktops and Laptops
- Language & Media Lab with latest Audio - Visual Equipment
- Psychology and Accounting & Finance Lab
- Wi-Fi Connectivity
- Indoor and Outdoor Gymnasium
- Fully Equipped Medical Room

=== Library ===
The college has a fully computerized library, which works on Online Public Access Catalogue (OPAC) system that helps to locate all the reading material available on the computer. The library has been divided into various sections— reference, textbook and newspapers & magazines. The library is stocked with more than 45,000 books and subscribes to various e-journals. It also provides access to in-house/remote access to e-publications and other subscribed resources of the University of Delhi.

== Academic Catalysts: Centers & Cells ==
=== Antha Prerna Cell ===
The Antha Prerna Cell inaugurated on 18 January 2019, under the aegis of the Department of Computer Science, Ramanujan College, provides a platform for the students to give life to their innovative ideas by implementing them on industrial projects and nurture them as future corporate professionals.

=== Centre for Robotics and Artificial Intelligence ===
The Centre for Robotics and Artificial Intelligence was established in November 2013. Centre for Robotics and Artificial Intelligence is working on emerging areas in the field of robotics, embedded systems and machine intelligence. The students under the centre are currently working on the star innovation project “Robotics in healthcare” in which they are trying to reduce the costs of existing machines and increasing their efficiency.

=== Centre for Ethics and Values ===
Centre for Ethics and Values (CEV) at Ramanujan College was established in 2010. CEV was created with an objective of functioning as a Resource Centre for imparting values-based education to students and professionals. The role of CEV was envisaged as creation of awareness in the learners’ community that skills and ethical values are essentially complementary. CEV is engaged with rigorous investigation of ethical issues, enlightened dialogue and the dissemination of knowledge that will lead to informed moral choice.

=== Centre for Human Rights Studies ===
The Centre for Human Rights Studies was established in February 2015, under of aegis of the Department of Political Science. The Centre coordinates a three-month UGC-Sponsored Certificate Course on Human Rights. Eminent resource persons are invited to deliver lectures on the prescribed syllabus. Students are required to submit a project report along with a Power-Point presentation at the end of the course.

=== Centre for Social Innovation ===
The Centre for Social Innovation was established in January 2016 with a vision to enact greater social links and creating new societal development and further to seek inspiration from the ventures so that others can take a step forward. The centre was set up as part of the star innovation project entitled “Sociovation,” sanctioned by University of Delhi, aimed to create a common platform to provide unison of all socio-innovators, students and the needy to be able to make a huge difference in bringing a radical change in the society. It has identified the four core issues as its thrust areas: Women Empowerment, Water Conservation, Illiteracy, Cleanliness and Sanitation.

=== Research Development and Services Cell ===
The Cell was formed in 2017 to promote research and development activities in the college. The cell successfully completed several academic and consultancy projects. To promote research amongst students, cell also provides incentives to them.

=== Thrust: Entrepreneurship Cell ===
It was formed in October 2015.

=== Media Cell ===
It was formed in July 2023 under the Internal Quality Assurance Cell (IQAC) under the guidance of then Principal Prof. (Dr.) S. P. Aggarwal, Chairman Shri Jigar Inamdar and then director of IQAC Prof. (Dr.) K. Latha.

== College Societies ==
Ramanujan College also has 20 students societies engaged in dancing, music, social entrepreneurship, commerce, fashion, foreign education and more namely:

1. Ramanujan Consulting Club
2. Bhangra Regiment
3. Brushstrokes – The Art
4. Dance Neuclic Acid (DNA)
5. Enactus
6. Firstcut – The Filmmaking Society
7. Girl Up Ramanujan
8. Jazba Theatre Group
9. National Cadet Corps (NCC)
10. National Service Scheme (NSS)
11. Outreach Program Society
12. Panache – The Fashion Society
13. Pramana – The Quiz Society
14. Shivranjini – The Music Society
15. Student Welfare Committee
16. Tark – The Debating Society
17. Tatva – The Eco Club
18. Sanidhya – The Animal Welfare Society
19. Global Scholars' Society (GSS) – The Study Abroad Society

== Appreciable Highlights ==
=== DDU Kaushal Kendra ===
Ramanujan College has been sanctioned Deen Dayal Upadhyay Centre for Knowledge Acquisition and Up-gradation of Skilled Human Abilities and Livelihood (KAUSHAL) by University Grants Commission in 2016. Ramanujan College is the only institution in the University of Delhi which has been sanctioned this scheme under which the college is offering B. Vocational Courses in Banking Operations and Software Development;

=== Teaching Learning Centre ===
Ramanujan College was awarded Teaching Learning Centre (TLC) under the Pandit Madan Mohan Malaviya National Mission on Teachers and Teaching (PMMMNMTT), sponsored by the Ministry of Human Resource Development in 2017. The Centre runs along the mission, objectives and the guidelines set up by the MHRD and has at its core the idea of facilitating teaching leaning process to the teachers across the country, especially those located in the remote areas of the country. Ramanujan College is the second college of the University of Delhi to be awarded the Teaching Learning Centre (TLC), the most sought-after scheme of the MHRD. Under this scheme, the centre has successfully trained more than 3500 teachers till March 2020. To continue the teaching-learning process in COVID-19 pandemic with the same pace, the centre has organized FDP/FIP/Workshop online having virtual engagement with all participants/learners. This initiative of the centre has received an overwhelming response from all over the country and more than 22000 teachers have been trained since April 2020 and several programmes are still ongoing.

=== National Resource Centre ===
The Ministry of HRD notified Ramanujan College as the National Resource Centre (NRC) in 2019 for three extremely pertinent and interrelated disciplines, namely, Human Rights, Environment and Ethics. The NRC's role is to conceptualise, create and disseminate contemporary knowledge in the field of study. This initiative is undertaken by the MHRD under the ambit of the Annual Refresher Programme in Teaching (ARPIT).

=== International Collaborations ===
The Ramanujan College has signed an Agreement of Academic Cooperation with MCI Management Center Innsbruck, Austria for a period of five years recognizing the benefits to be gained by both institutions through a cooperation in teaching, academic research and operations, promote exchange of students, staff and knowledge within the interests and abilities of each institution. Exchange of students and academic staff along with joint development and organization of academic programs, courses or seminars and research will be the focus of this collaborative effort.

== Rankings ==
The college is ranked 37th among colleges in India by the National Institutional Ranking Framework (NIRF) in 2025.

University rankings

General – India
- NIRF (Colleges) (2024): 56
