= Kamala Nehru College =

Constituent College of University of Delhi

Coordinates: 28.555814°N 77.216345°E

- Emblem of Kamala Nehru College
- Motto: Without Knowledge there is no Salvation
- Type: Public
- Established: 1964
- Principal: Prof. (Dr.) Pavitra Bhardwaj
- Faculty: 200+
- Location: Delhi, India
- Campus: Urban
- Website: www.knc.du.ac.in

Kamala Nehru College is located at the August Kranti Marg, South Delhi. It was established in the year 1964 and is affiliated to University of Delhi. Kamala Nehru College Delhi University carries an ‘A’ Grade and is one of the most prestigious all-girls colleges of Delhi University, as accredited by National Assessment and Accreditation Council (NAAC). Kamala Nehru College is recognized for its excellent infrastructure which is tallied amongst the best in the University. Kamala Nehru College is among the top 24 Arts colleges affiliated with the University of Delhi (2022 with Rankings) with other prestigious colleges of Delhi University such as Miranda House, Hindu College, Kirori Mal College, and so on.

== History ==
Kamala Nehru college was founded in 1964 by Dr KK Gorowara, as Government College for Women and was located in Defence Colony, Delhi. In the year 1966 the college was renamed 'Modern College for Women'. Later in 1974 the college was renamed after the freedom fighter, wife of Jawaharlal Nehru, Kamala Nehru, and finally christened Kamala Nehru College. It was then shifted to its present location on August Kranti Marg South Delhi.

When the college was started it just had 16 staff members and 209 students passed out in the first batch in 1968. The College Magazine ‘Swati’ was launched in the academic year 1965–66. Further in 1966–67, the college was renamed as ‘Modern College for Women’ and in 1967-68 the College Magazine acquired a new name ‘Apoorva’. On 21 November 1972, the foundation stone for a new building was laid at Hauz Khas (at present August Kranti Marg) by then President Shri V.V.Giri. The college was given a new name and it became Kamala Nehru College. In 1974, on the occasion of Founder's Day, Mrs. Indira Gandhi visited the new building, unveiled the plaque and planted saplings.

The college's auditorium was built through contribution made by the staff and students through fundraising campaigns. It was inaugurated on 17 December 1991 by the then vice president Dr. Shankar Dayal Sharma. Today the college has well maintained sports grounds, computer labs, gymnasium and eco-friendly classrooms (bamboo rooms apart from the main building). The library is well stacked and has a separate audio visual section. The college is accessible and is under constant CCTV surveillance. The Placement Cell, NSS, NSO, NCC, Counselling Cell function for the overall wellbeing of the students. Kamala Nehru College has several extra-curricular societies that cover the whole gamut of personality development aspects by providing plural avenues to students for self-discovery. All departments and the societies have their annual newsletters/magazines and the college comes up with its journal ‘Akademos’(An Annual Miscellany of Liberal Arts and Scholarship, ISSN 2231-0584) each year.

== Academics ==
=== Academic programmes ===
The college offers various programmes such as undergraduate, postgraduate and add-on courses under the aegis of Delhi University. They are listed below-

==== Undergraduate ====
- Bachelor of Arts (B.A.) HONS in Economics, English, Geography, Hindi, History, Journalism, Mathematics, Philosophy, Political Science, Psychology, Sanskrit and Sociology.
- Bachelor of Arts (B.A.) programme in Bengali, Economics, English, Geography, Hindi, History, Mathematics, Philosophy, Political Science, Punjabi, Sanskrit, Sociology and Advertisement Sales Management and Sales Promotion.
- Bachelor of Commerce (B.Com.) Honors
- Bachelor of Commerce (B.Com.) pass

==== Postgraduate ====
Master of Arts (M.A) in English, Hindi, History, Political Science, Philosophy, Sanskrit and Assamese.

==== Add-On courses ====
- French language course (certificate, diploma and advanced diploma)
- A Certificate Course on Ecotourism

=== Rankings ===
The college is ranked 43rd among colleges in India by the National Institutional Ranking Framework (NIRF) in 2024.

College rankings

General – India
- NIRF (Colleges) (2024): 43

=== Placement Cell ===
The Placement Cell at Kamala Nehru College was instituted in 2006 and since its inception, it has been an integral part of the college. The college has provided complete infrastructure for the effective functioning of the cell. Top companies like EY, KPMG, and Wipro recruit students through on-campus placement.

The Placement Cell serves as an interface between the students and the Corporates. Apart from bringing a varied list of Recruiters to the campus, the Placement Cell also organizes talks, study abroad seminars, internship opportunities and workshops for the collective student body.

The aim is to ensure that students have the information and skills necessary for an effective job search. To conduct professional training programs outside the curricula to provide better placements. Arranging preparatory programmers’ such as seminars, group discussions, written tests/interviews (mock), confidence building and personality development sessions, the general awareness courses, etc. by experts in their respective fields for students to gauge and handle challenging aspects in their prescribed work sphere Internships are also offered to those students who are keen on experiencing a slice of workplace life. Acts as a link between students, alumni, and the workplace. To organize campus interviews for final year students with industries and business houses of repute from all over India. To prepare students to face campus interviews by arranging training in Aptitude tests, group discussions, preparing for Technical and HR interviews through professional trainers and alumni. To promote career counseling by organizing guidance lectures by senior corporate personnel and most importantly by the immediately placed senior students. Placement Cell has also been active on social media providing the students with a quick and easy interface to browse through and apply to their preferred internships and placements opportunities.
