= Janki Devi Memorial College =

University of Delhi women's college

Janki Memorial College
- Motto: Vidya Hi Param Jyotim
- Type: Public
- Established: 1959
- Affiliations: University of Delhi
- Principal: Swati Pal
- Director: Chairman of Trust: Mr Aditya Krishna
- Location: Sir Ganga Ram Hospital Marg, Old Rajendra Nagar, Delhi, India; 28.6419°N 77.1917°E
- Campus: Urban
- Website: www.jdm.du.ac.in

Janki Devi Memorial College (JDMC) is one of the women's colleges of University of Delhi. The college is located at Sir Ganga Ram Hospital Marg, Central Delhi. The college is near the Karol Bagh Metro Station.

== History ==
The college was established in the year 1959 by Shri Brij Krishna Chandiwala in the memory of his mother Smt. Janki Devi.

== Programmes ==
Under the aegis of University of Delhi the college offers various undergraduate, postgraduate and short-term courses. Theses are :

=== Undergraduate ===
- Bachelor of Arts (B.A) Programme
- Bachelor of Arts (B.A) Hons.
- Bachelor of Commerce (B.Com.) Programme
- Bachelor of Commerce (B.Com.) Hons.
- Bachelor of Economics (ECO) Hons.
- Bachelor of Science (B.Sc.) Hons.
- Bachelor of Education (B.Ed.)
- Bachelor of Fine Arts (BFA)

=== Postgraduate ===
- Master of Arts (M.A)
- Master of Commerce (M.Com.)

=== Short-term courses ===
- English language Proficiency Courses (ELPC)
- Spanish Language Certificate Course (SLCC)
