= Aditi Mahavidyalaya =

Constituent college of University of Delhi

Coordinates: 28.795612°N 77.036836°E

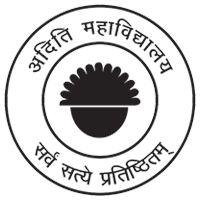
- Aditi Mahavidyalaya logo
- Other name: AMV
- Motto: Sarve Satyam Partistham
- Type: Public
- Established: 1994; 31 years ago
- Accreditation: NAAC
- Affiliations: University of Delhi
- Principal: Dr Mamta Sharma
- Faculty: 60+
- Administrative staff: 100
- Students: 3,000+
- Location: Bawana, Delhi, India
- Campus: Urban
- Website: aditi.du.ac.in

Aditi Mahavidyalaya is a constituent college of University of Delhi and a women's college. It is located on Delhi Auchandi Road, Bawana, Delhi, India. It was established in 1994 as an institution of higher education.

== Programmes ==
The college offers mainly bachelor's degree in the following courses:

- Bachelor of Arts (B.A.) (Hons) Geography
- Bachelor of Arts (B.A.) (Hons) Hindi Patrakarita evam Jansanchaar
- Bachelor of Arts (B.A.) (Hons) Social Work
- Bachelor of Arts (B.A.) Programme
- Bachelor of Commerce (B.Com)
- Bachelor of Commerce (B.Com) (Hons)
- Bachelor of Elementary Education (B.El.Ed.)

== Activities and culture ==
The college celebrates and organizes various events, including:

- Navya - an annual college magazine that offers opportunities to students to come up with their skills and talent.
- Aarohi - a newsletter by the Department of B. El. Ed.
- Aditi-Samachar - a newsletter by the Department of Hindi Journalism
- Equal Opportunity Cell (EOC) - This was started years back by the University of Delhi to encourage backward classes of society such as SC, ST, OBC, and people with disabilities. This programme aims to sensitize the academic community.
- Students' Union - Membership offered to some students to represent the college at the university level.
- Annual festival - Utsav - The college celebrates an annual festival (Utsav) in which students participate and organize various events such as dance and singing competitions.
- Fresher's Orientation Day - Under this activity newcomers mainly who appear in the first year are welcomed by the college and the post students.
- Global Fund to fight AIDS, Tuberculosis & Malaria (GFATM) - The college is associated with GFATM to deal with problems such as tuberculosis and malaria.
