= College of Vocational Studies =

College of Delhi University

Coordinates: 28.5330°N 77.2274°E

- Other name: CVS
- Type: Public
- Established: 1972; 53 years ago
- Accreditation: NAAC (A Grade)
- Affiliations: University of Delhi
- Chairman: M.N. Doja
- Vice-Chancellor: Yogesh Singh
- Principal: Prof. Shiv Kumar Sahdev
- Academic staff: 120
- Administrative staff: 200
- Students: 4,000+
- Location: Triveni, Sheikh Sarai-II, South Delhi, Delhi, India
- Campus: Urban
- Website: www.cvs.du.ac.in

The College of Vocational Studies (CVS) is a constituent college of the University of Delhi. It is a co-educational college founded in 1972 with emphasis on vocational education as well as honours courses to bridge the gap between traditional university education, through courses in French, German and Spanish languages, Post Graduate Diploma in Tourism and Post Graduate Diploma in Book Publishing. It is well versed in the traditional course as well. Courses like Bachelor of Management Studies Honours, History Honours, English Honours, Economics Honours, Computer Science Honours, etc. are also being offered at the college.

The college is situated in the heart of Delhi at Sheikh Sarai Phase-II. The nearest metro stations are Chirag Delhi gate number 5 and Malviya Nagar gate number 2 & 3. It is very close to Select Citywalk, Max Hospital Malviya Nagar & PSRI Hospital.

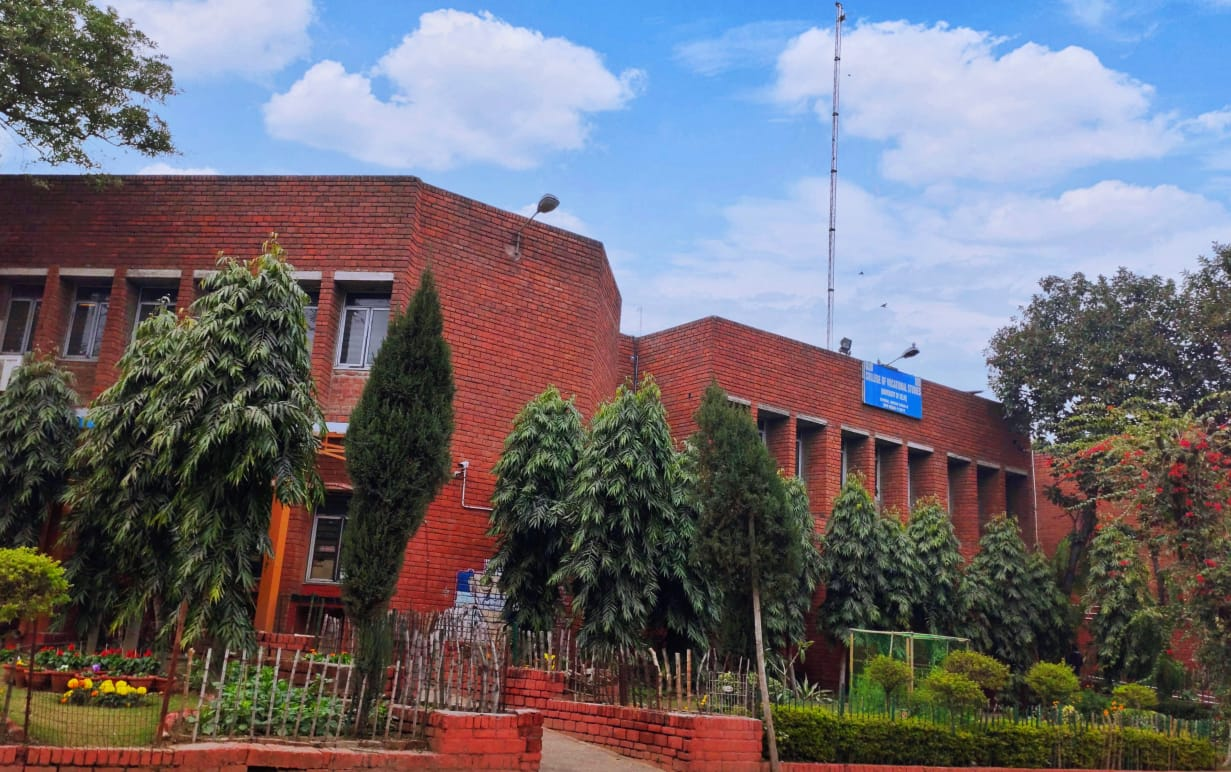

== Courses offered ==
The college offers B.A. (Vocational Studies) in 7 fields: Management and Marketing of Insurance (MMI), Marketing Management and Retail Business (MMRB), Tourism Management, Office Management and Secretarial Practice (OMSP), Small and Medium Enterprises (SME), Human Resource Management (HRM) and Material Management (MM).

The college also offers professional honours courses like Bachelor of Management Studies (BMS) and B.A. (Hons.) Business Economics (BBE) where admission is made through CUET(Common University Entrance Test). The college also has regular honours courses like B.Com. (Hons.), B.A. (Hons.) Economics, B.A. (Hons.) History, B.Sc. (Hons.) Computer Science, and B.A.(Hons.) English and B.A. (Hons.) Hindi.

== Admission ==
Admission to all the courses being carried out through the Common University Entrance Test (CUET UG).
