= Bhaskaracharya College of Applied Sciences =

Public College of the University of Delhi, India

- College Logo
- Other name: BCAS
- Motto: ज्ञान विज्ञान सहितम् (Gyan Vigyan Sahitam)
- Motto in English: With knowledge science
- Type: Public
- Established: 1995; 31 years ago
- Accreditation: NAAC (A++)
- Affiliations: University of Delhi
- Principal: Avneesh Mittal
- Academic staff: 100
- Administrative staff: 120
- Students: c. 2400
- Location: Sector 2, Pocket 2, Dwarka, Delhi, India; 28.600°N 77.068°E
- Campus: Urban, 12 acres (4.9 ha)
- Website: bcas.du.ac.in

Bhaskaracharya College of Applied Sciences (BCAS) is a constituent college of the University of Delhi. Commonly known as BCAS, it is completely funded by the Government of Delhi. Established in 1995, it offers undergraduate courses in various disciplines of sciences and applied sciences. It was ranked 27th among colleges in India by the National Institutional Ranking Framework (NIRF) in 2024,

== History ==
Bhaskaracharya College of Applied Sciences was established in 1995. The college is named after the 12th century mathematician Bhaskaracharya (commonly referred to as Bhāskara II).

== Admission ==
Admission to all courses is carried out through the Common University Entrance Test (CUET-UG).

== Ranking ==
College rankings

General – India
- NIRF (Colleges) (2022): 25
- NIRF (Colleges) (2023): 22
- NIRF (Colleges) (2024): 27

In the NIRF 2024 ranking list, the college was ranked 27th, while in 2023 the college was ranked 22nd in India college rankings. It is also accredited by National Assessment and Accreditation Council (NAAC) and IQAC.

== Student life ==
=== Students' union ===
The college has a students' union, and its office bearers are elected by the students. The students' union organizes annual festival of BCAS and addresses all student-related problems.

== See also ==
- Delhi University
- Central university (India)
- University Grants Commission (India)
- Higher education in India
- National Assessment and Accreditation Council
