= Bharati College =

Constituent college of Delhi University, Delhi, India

- Type: Public
- Established: 1971
- Affiliations: University of Delhi
- Principal: Mrs.Saloni Gupta
- Students: 4000
- Location: Delhi, India
- Campus: Urban
- Website: bharaticollege.org

Bharati College, founded in 1971 as Bharati Mahila College, is a women's college constituent to the University of Delhi. The college caters to more than 2000 women students. It is located in the Janakpuri district of Delhi. The college offers Bachelor's courses in Literature, humanities, science and commerce. It is well connected with other parts of the city by various means of transport. Mrs. Saloni Gupta is currently the acting principal of the college. Admission to Bharati College is given on the basis of Delhi University cut offs released each year for different courses.

== Courses Offered ==
The college offers the following courses

BA Honours in English BCom with Honours in Commerce BA Honours in Political Science BA Honours in Hindi BA Honours in History BA Honours in Sanskrit BA Honours in Psychology BSC Honours in Mathematics BA Honours in Journalism BA Honours in Psychology. Bharati College is one of the few colleges in India that provides a degree in BA(Hons) Journalism.

BA Programme

MA Hindi

And some other courses like foreign languages and computer courses.
