= Maitreyi College =

Constituent college of University of Delhi

Coordinates: 28.5920°N 77.1776°E

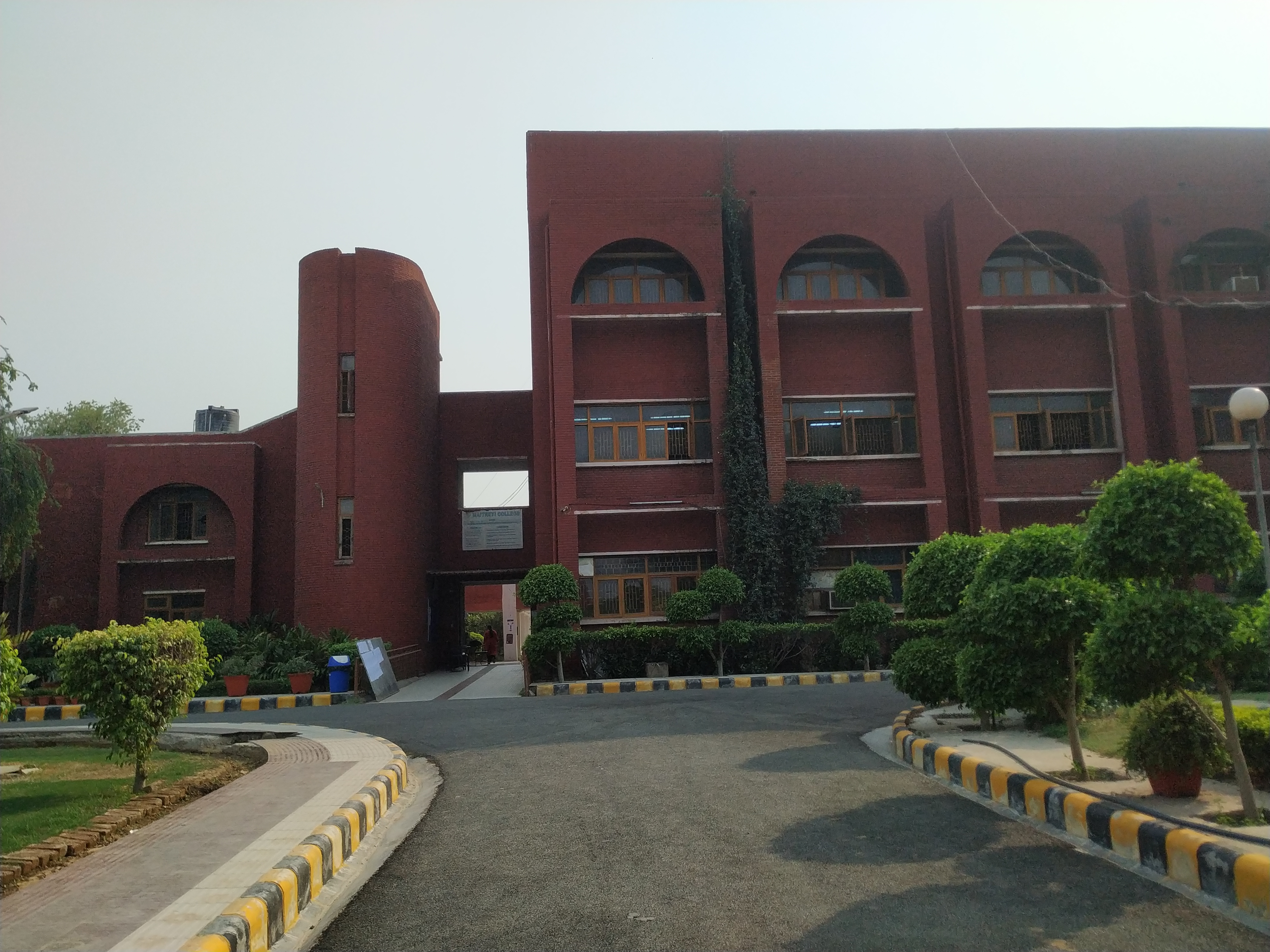
- Type: Government
- Established: July 1967; 59 years ago
- Affiliations: University of Delhi
- Principal: Dr. Haritma Chopra
- Location: Bapudham Complex, Chanakyapuri, New Delhi, Delhi, India
- Campus: Urban
- Website: maitreyi.ac.in

Maitreyi College is a women's college in the South Campus of the University of Delhi, located in Bapu Dham, Chanakyapuri, New Delhi-110021, India. It was established in July 1967 and named after the Vedic sage Maitreyi. An all-women's college, it offers various courses in the fields of Science, Arts and Commerce. The college was recognised by DBT as a star college, conferring the star status to all four of its science departments namely Botany, Zoology, Chemistry and Mathematics.

It is ranked 38th among colleges in India by the National Institutional Ranking Framework (NIRF) in 2025. The college has been accredited grade A++ by NAAC.

Due to the construction of Pink Line, Maitreyi College is quite accessible via Delhi Metro. The nearest metro station is Durgabai Deshmukh South Campus metro station which is around 1 km from the college.

== Rankings ==
It is ranked 34th among colleges in India by National Institutional Ranking Framework in 2022.

College rankings

== Awards ==
Maitreyi College has won many awards for its lawns. The college was awarded 'The Deshbandhu College Cup' for the Best Lawn and 'The Department of Persian Cup' for the Best Garden at the Delhi University Annual Flower Show 2018. The college won 17 prizes in different cut flower categories. The college's gardener, Shri Ram Bahadur was awarded the title of the Best Mali for the year 2018.

== Notable alumni ==
- Priyanka Bose, actress and model
- Sugandha Garg, actress, singer and TV host
- Malini Agarwal, celebrity blogger, Founder & Blogger-in-Chief of MissMalini.com, radio DJ
