= Keshav Mahavidyalaya =

Constituent college of the University of Delhi in India

- Motto: Sanskrit: "ऋते ज्ञानान्न मुिक्त:"
- Motto in English: "Only Knowledge can provide Salvation"
- Established: 1994
- Founder: Dr. K.P. Chinda
- Affiliations: University of Delhi
- Principal: Prof. Arpana Sharma
- Location: H-4-5 ZONE, Road no. 43, Pitampura, 110034, Delhi, India
- Campus: Urban
- Nickname: KMV
- Website: keshav.du.ac.in

Keshav Mahavidyalaya, also known as KMV, is a constituent college of the University of Delhi located in the northwest residential area of Pitam Pura. Official Web site :- https://keshav.du.ac.in/ It was established by the Government of Delhi in August, 1994. When the college was established, its campus was a school building in the northwest residential area of Keshav Puram. The college admits only undergraduates and awards degrees under the purview of the University of Delhi. Department url =https://keshav.du.ac.in/academics/departments Programmesurl=https://keshav.du.ac.in/academics/programmes

== Rankings ==
The college is ranked 93rd among colleges in India by the National Institutional Ranking Framework (NIRF) in 2025.

University rankings

== Campus ==
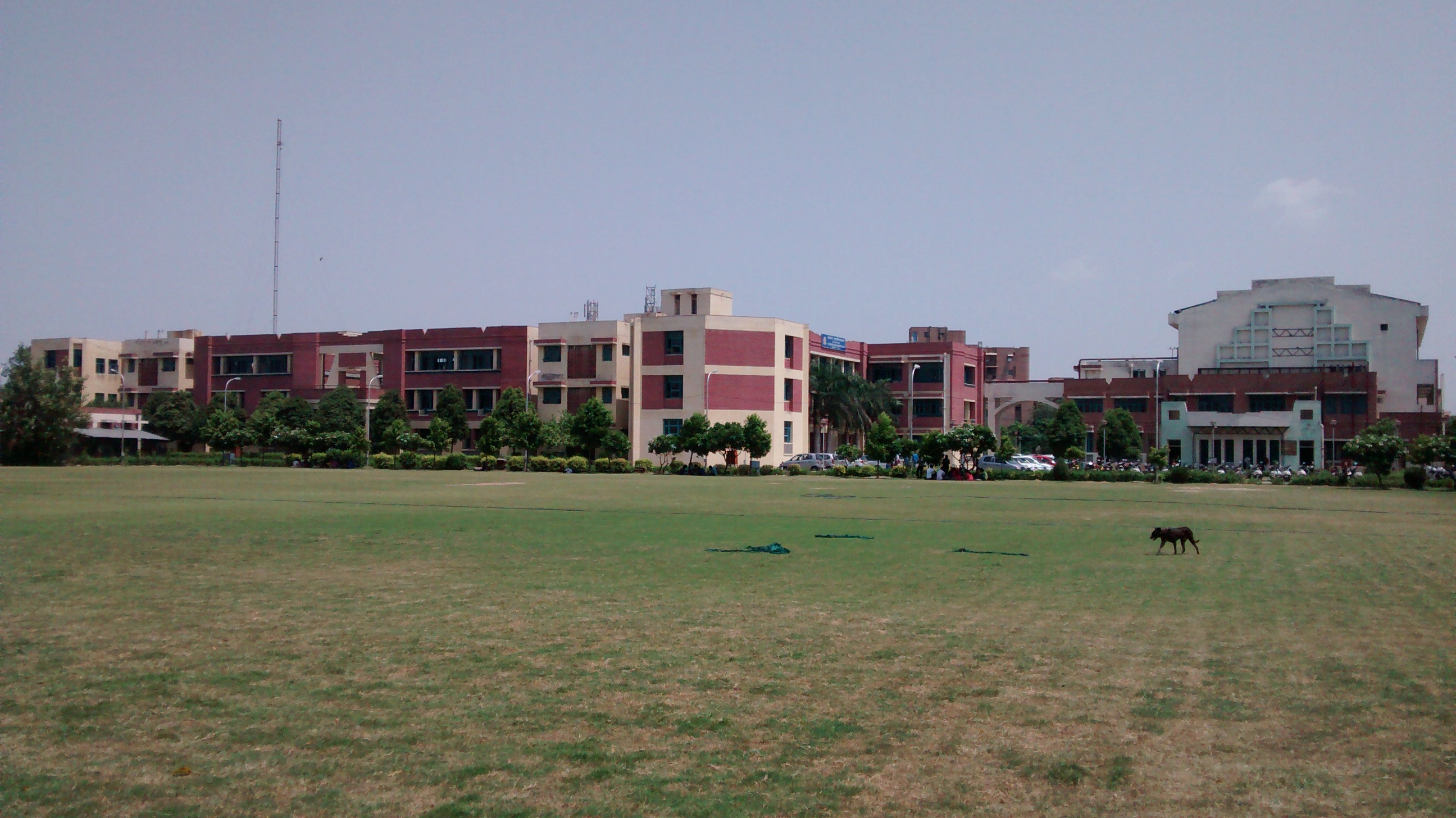
Campus of Keshav Mahavidyalaya

The foundation stone of the new campus building was laid by former Chief Minister of Delhi, Smt. Shiela Dixit on 23 March 2003. The campus building was inaugurated by former Lt. Governor B.L. Joshi on 27 November 2005. The students began to be admitted from the academic session of 2006-07 with inclusion of new courses like Maths (H), Psychology (H) and BMS.

=== Hostel ===
The campus comprises a girl's hostel beside the campus building. It can accommodate 75 students on a twin sharing basis. The hostel provides a messdeck facility.

== Sports ==
KMV lays emphasis on 'all-round' development of students. To accomplish this, the college manages a full-size ground, which accommodates sports like Football, Handball, Athletics etc. However, there is no cricket pitch and badminton court in the college. The college conducts a Sports Day in every year.

KMV boasts a separate sports room which contains a table-tennis room and a fully functional unisex gym.
