= School of Open Learning =

Distance Education School of DU

Delhi University, School Of Open Learning (DU SOL)
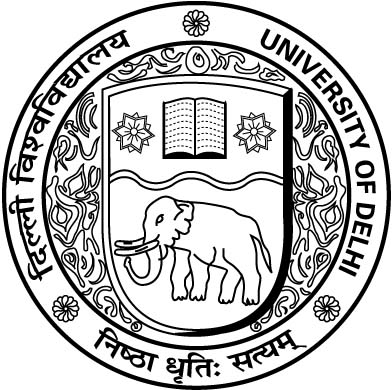
- Seal of the University of Delhi
- Former names: School of Correspondence Courses and Continuing Education
- Motto: निष्ठा धृतिः सत्यं
- Motto in English: Dedication, Steadfastness and Truth
- Type: Public
- Established: 1962
- Affiliations: University of Delhi
- Vice-Chancellor: Yogesh Singh
- Location: Delhi, India; 28°41′35″N 77°12′47″E
- Campus: Urban
- Colours: White
- Website: sol.du.ac.in

The University of Delhi-School of Open Learning (DU-SOL) is a constituent school of the University of Delhi. It was established in 1962, and offers programmes in humanities, sciences and commerce. Courses offered are under correspondence courses and continuing education policies of the university and respective government agencies.

== Overview ==
The school offers undergraduate and postgraduate degree courses in the subjects of Arts/Humanities and Commerce.

In 2022, DU has implemented the New Education Policy(NEP) 2020 and Undergraduate Curriculum Framework (UGCF) 2022.

Many students take admission here due to many of them living very far from colleges, due to financial issues or not being able to take admission in regular courses, etc.

== Recognition of degrees and certificates ==
A degree of DU-SOL is equivalent to a degree from any regular college in India.

== Centres ==
The school also has four regional centres across Delhi{North (Head Office), South, East and West(COL)}.

- School of Open Learning, North Campus, University of Delhi, 5 Cavalry Lines University of Delhi, Delhi 110007
- School of Open Learning, South Study Centre, University of Delhi, Old Moti Lal Nehru College Building, Block C, Moti Bagh South Market, South Moti Bagh, Delhi 110021
- Campus of Open Learning, West Campus, University of Delhi, C-2, Lawrence Rd, Block C3, Keshav Puram, Delhi 110035
- The East Campus is under construction in Dilshad Garden.

== See also ==
- University of Delhi
- National Institute of Open Schooling
- Indira Gandhi National Open University
