= Ram Lal Anand College =

College of University of Delhi

Coordinates: 28.578545°N 77.161284°E

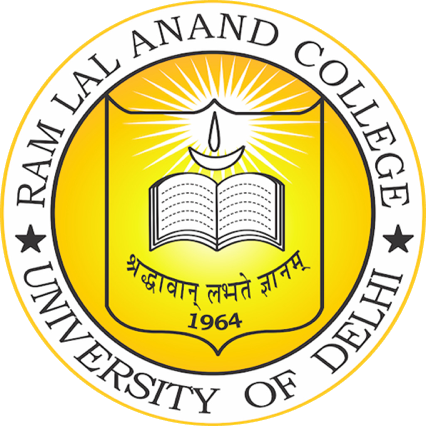
- Other name: RLA
- Motto: श्रद्धावान लभते ज्ञानं
- Motto in English: Earn knowledge with Dedication
- Type: Public (Central Government)
- Established: 1964
- Accreditation: NAAC (A+)
- Affiliations: University of Delhi
- Chairperson: Jigar Champaklal Inamdar
- Principal: Rakesh Kumar Gupta
- Students: 2,500
- Location: Benito Juarez Road, New Delhi-110021, India
- Campus: 10 acres (4.0 ha); South Campus, University Enclave
- Website: rlacollege.edu.in

Ram Lal Anand College (RLA) is located in New Delhi, India. It was established in 1964, and has been one of the University of Delhi maintained colleges since 1973. It awards degrees under the purview of the University and offers courses at the undergraduate level.

The college is situated in the South Campus of University of Delhi. It is a co-educational college that admits students and selects teachers from all communities irrespective of gender, caste, religion and physical challenges.

== History ==
Ram Lal Anand College was founded in the year 1964 by Shri Ram Lal Anand, a senior advocate in the Supreme Court of India, in response to the growing social demand in the sixties for providing educational opportunities at the university level. The college was initially managed by the Ram Lal Anand College Trust. It was later taken over by the University of Delhi. Since 1973, it has been run by the University of Delhi as a University Maintained Institution.

In 2014, Ram lal Anand College (Evening) became a new college named Aryabhatta College. So, the area of the college was divided amongst the two colleges. The new building of Aryabhatta college is being built. Currently, both colleges share the same sports ground. After, the building of Aryabhatta college is complete, the area will be taken over by Ram lal Anand College.

== Facilities ==
The college features a ground where sports and cultural events are held. It has a canteen which serves hygienic food to the students. The college offers a Programme of Mentorship conducted by the teachers of all the departments. It has a seminar hall and a beautiful auditorium -Amphi Theatre with capacity of 200+ seats. College facilities include wi-fi, sports room, activity room and an in-development computer centre. There are ramps and toilets for disabled people (PWD, physically challenged people).

== Library ==
The college library contains over 1,00,000 books and a reading room with e-books.

== Courses offered ==
Undergraduate and postgraduate courses were offered in morning and evening shifts under the aegis of University of Delhi, but changed after the creation of Aryabhatta College. It now offers courses only in morning shift.

=== Postgraduate courses ===
- Master of Arts (M.A.) in Hindi

=== Undergraduate courses ===
- B.A. (Hons) English
- B.A. (Hons) Hindi
- B.A. (Hons) Political Science
- B.A. (Hons) History
- B.A. (Hons) Hindi Patrakarita & Mass Communication
- B.A. Programme
- B.Com. (Hons)
- B.Com. Programme
- B.Sc. (Hons) Computer Science
- B.Sc. (Hons) Geology
- B.Sc. (Hons) Microbiology
- Bachelor of Management studies (B.M.S)
- B.Sc. (Hons) Statistics
- B.Sc. (Hons) Mathematics
- Physical Education
- Economics & Insurance
- Bachelor of Technology Hons in Computer Science (approved by AICTE) discontinued after 2014, there is only one batch known as FYUP 2013 Batch.

== Student life ==
The college offers students the opportunity to actively participate in sports and various cultural activities. Students may also engage in debates, dialogue sessions and seminars conducted at the college. The college also has NCC, under 7 Delhi Battalion Unit. The Ramlal Lal Anand College NCC Cadets participate in international, national, regional camps of NCC.
