= List of Delhi University people =

This is a list of notable people related to the University of Delhi. This page excludes those people whose only connection with Delhi University is that they were awarded an honorary degree.

Nine heads of state and government, and two Nobel laureates have been associated with the university.

== Nobel laureates ==
Two Nobel laureates have been associated with Delhi University.

Name	Affiliation	Prize	Year	References
Aung San Suu Kyi	B.A. in Political Science (1964)	Nobel Peace Prize	1991	
Amartya Sen	Professor of Economics (1963–1971)	Nobel Memorial Prize in Economic Sciences	1998	

== Activists ==
Name	Class year	Degree	College	Notability	References
Aruna Roy			Indraprastha	founder of Mazdoor Kisan Shakti Sangathan	
Bunker Roy	1967		St. Stephen's	social activist and educator	
Rahul Verma			Delhi College of Arts and Commerce	social worker, columnist and founder of Uday Foundation	
Sunita Narain	1983		School of Open Learning	environmentalist, director of Centre for Science and Environment	
Urvashi Butalia			Reader at College of Vocational Studies	founder of Zubaan, a feminist publishing house	

== Arts, entertainment and television ==
Name	Class year	Degree	College	Notability	References
Aarti Bajaj			Hansraj College	film editor	
Abish Mathew			Ram Lal Anand College	Indian comedian and YouTuber	
Abhimanyu Singh			St. Stephen's	actor	
Abhinav Kashyap	1995	B.A. (English)	Hansraj College	film director and screenwriter	
Abhishek Chaubey	1998		Hindu College	film director	
Aditi Arya			Shaheed Sukhdev College of Business Studies	model and actress	
Aditi Rao Hydari			Lady Shri Ram	actress	
Aditya Dhar			Hindu College	film director	
Alankrita Sahai			Gargi College	model	
Ali Abbas Zafar			Kirori Mal College	film director	
Amba Sanyal			Delhi College of Art (Note: The Department of Architecture, Delhi College of Engineering (now known as School of Planning and Architecture) was affiliated to the University of Delhi until 1979.)	stage actor and costume designer	
Amitabh Bachchan			Sri Aurobindo College	actor	
Anjolie Ela Menon			Miranda House	artist	
Aneet Padda			Jesus and Mary	actress	
Ankita Shorey	2013	B.A. (History)	Jesus and Mary	model, Femina Miss India International (2011)	
Anu Aggarwal				actress	
Anurag Kashyap			Hansraj College	filmmaker	
Arjun Rampal	1993		Hindu College	actor	
Ashvin Kumar			St Stephen's	independent filmmaker	
Baisali Mohanty			Lady Shri Ram	Odissi dancer	
Benjamin Gilani		M.A. (English)	St Stephen's	actor	
Chitrangada Singh		BSc (Home Science)	Lady Irwin College	actress	
Deepa Mehta			Lady Shri Ram	director	
Devika Vaid		BCom		model and beauty queen	
Dipannita Sharma			Indraprastha	actress	
Ekta Chowdhry				model	
Gauri Khan			Sri Aurobindo College	film producer and co-owner of Red Chillies Entertainment	
Geeta Chandran			Lady Shri Ram	Bharatanatyam dancer	
Gulshan Grover			Shri Ram College of Commerce	actor	
Hasleen Kaur			Jesus and Mary	model	
Huma Qureshi	2007	B.A. (History)	Sri Aurobindo College	film actress and model	
Indrani Dasgupta		B.A. (Economics)	Miranda House	model	
Imtiaz Ali	1993		Hindu College	film director	
Imran Zahid		BCom	Hindu College	theatre and film actor	
Jaspinder Narula		B.A. (Music) PhD (Hindustani Music)	Indraprastha Faculty of Music and Fine Arts	playback singer	
Kabir Bedi			St Stephen's	film actor	
Kabir Khan			Kirori Mal College	film director and screenwriter	
Kahlil Joseph		B.A. (English)	Ramjas College	American actor and director	
Karan Oberoi		BCom (Hons)	Sri Guru Gobind Singh College of Commerce	fitness and fashion model	
Konkona Sen Sharma	2001		St Stephen's	actor	
Koyal Rana	2014		Deen Dayal Upadhyaya	model	
Krishnakumar Kunnath		BCom	Kirori Mal College	singer	
Kulbhushan Kharbanda			Kirori Mal College	film actor	
Madhumita Raut			Indraprastha	Odissi dancer	
Madhur Jaffrey	1953	B.A. (English)	Miranda House	actress and food critic	
Mallika Sherawat		B.A. (Philosophy)	Miranda House	actress	
Maneesh Sharma		B.A. (English Literature)	Hansraj College	film director	
Manish Paul		B.A. (Tourism)	College of Vocational Studies	television host and stand-up comedian	
Manish Jha		B.A. (English)	Ramjas College	director	
Manoj Bajpayee	1989	B.A. (History)	Ramjas College	Bollywood actor	
Manpreet Brar			Lady Irwin	model	
Manushi Chhillar	did not graduate		Miranda House	actress and model	
Marc Robinson		M.A. (Economics)	Delhi School of Economics	supermodel, fashion director and fashion choreographer	
Mini Mathur		B.A. (English Literature)	Lady Shri Ram	television host and actress	
Minissha Lamba			Miranda House	film actor	
Mira Nair		B.A. (Sociology)	Miranda House	director	
Mrinalini Sharma			Jesus and Mary	actress	
Nandita Das			Miranda House; Delhi School of Social Work	actress	
Nandita Chandra			Lady Shri Ram	theatre actor	
Naveen Kasturia		BTech (MPAE)	NSIT (Note: The Netaji Subhas Institute of Technology (now known as Netaji Subhas University of Technology) was affiliated to the University of Delhi until 2018)	film actor and assistant director	
Neetu Chandra			Indraprastha	model and actress	
Neeraj Pandey			Sri Aurobindo College	director, writer and producer	
Neha Dhupia		B.A. (History)	Jesus and Mary	actress	
Nimrat Kaur		BCom	Shri Ram College of Commerce	actress	
Nivedita Tiwari	2006	B.A. (English)	Ramjas College	actress	
Palash Sen		MBBS	University College of Medical Sciences	founder of rock band Euphoria	
Pamella Bordes			Lady Shri Ram	model and photographer	
Parikshit Sahni			St. Stephen's	actor	
Parvin Dabas			Hansraj College	actor	
Pathik Vats			Ramjas College	dialogue-writer	
Pavan Malhotra			Hansraj College	actor	
Prakash Jha	did not graduate	BSc (Physics)	Ramjas College	director	
Priyanka Kothari			Dyal Singh	actress	
Priyanshu Chatterjee			Ram Lal Anand	film actor	
Rabbi Shergill			Sri Guru Tegh Bahadur Khalsa College	singer, musician	
Radhika Madan			Jesus and Mary	actress	
Rahul Roy			Ramjas College	actor	
Rajesh Hamal		M.A. (English)			
Rajinder Nath		M.A. (English)	Kirori Mal College	theatre director	
Rajkumar Gupta			Ramjas College	Bollywood director	
Rakeysh Omprakash Mehra			Shri Ram College of Commerce	director	
Rakul Preet Singh	2012	BSc (Maths)	Jesus and Mary	actress	
Rannvijay Singh			Hansraj College	VJ with MTV India; current host and director of MTV Roadies	
Rati Pandey		B.A. (Economics)	Miranda House	actress	
Rekha Bhardwaj		B.A. (Music)	Hindu College	singer	
Richa Chadda			St. Stephen's	actress	
Ritu Kumar			Lady Irwin	fashion designer	
Ritu Beri			Lady Shri Ram	fashion designer	
Rohit Bal		B.A. (History)	St Stephen's	fashion designer	
Roshan Seth			St Stephen's	actor	
Saakshi Tanwar			Lady Shri Ram	TV actor, star of Star Plus daily Kahaani Ghar Ghar Kii	
Sandali Sinha			Lady Shri Ram	actress and model	
Sanya Malhotra			Gargi	actress	
Satish Kaushik			Kirori Mal College	actor and film director	
Saurabh Shukla			Sri Guru Tegh Bahadur Khalsa College	actor, director	
Shah Rukh Khan	1988		Hansraj College	Bollywood actor	
Shakti Kapoor			Kirori Mal College	actor	
Shanky Singh	2010		Maharaja Agrasen	CWE wrestler	
Sharan Rani Backliwal			Indraprastha	sarod player; recipient of Padma Shri and Padma Vibhushan	
Shekhar Kapur		B.A. (Economics)	St Stephen's	film director	
Shekhar Suman		B.A. (History)	Ramjas College	Bollywood actor; TV personality	
Shikha Swaroop			St Stephen's	Miss India	
Shonali Nagrani			Lady Shri Ram	model and actress	
Shriya Saran		B.A.	Lady Shri Ram	actress	
Siddharth			Kirori Mal College	actor	
Siddharth Malhotra		BCom	Shaheed Bhagat Singh	actor	
Siddhartha Basu			Hindu College	television producer and quizmaster	
Sonal Chauhan			Gargi	model and actress	
Sriti Jha			Sri Venkateswara College	actress	
Sushant Singh Rajput	did not graduate		Delhi College of Engineering (Note: The Delhi College of Engineering (now known as Delhi Technological University) was affiliated to the University of Delhi until 2009.)	actor	
Swara Bhaskar			Miranda	actress	
Tahir Raj Bhasin			Hindu College	actor	
Theja Rio				film director, screenwriter	
Tisca Chopra			Hindu College	actress	
Vikas Bahl			Ramjas College	director	
Vipin Patwa			Ramjas College	music composer; singer	
Vishal Bhardwaj			Hindu College	director	

== Business ==
Name	Class year	Degree	College	Notability	References
Ajaypal Singh Banga		B.A. (Economics)	St. Stephen's	CEO and President, MasterCard	
Anshu Jain	1983	B.A. (Economics)	Shri Ram College of Commerce	co-CEO, Deutsche Bank	
Geeta Aiyer		B.A., M.A.		founder and President, Boston Common Asset Management	
Ivan Menezes			St. Stephen's	CEO of Diageo	
Naina Lal Kidwai	1977		Lady Shri Ram	Chief Executive Officer, HSBC India	
Piyush Gupta		B.A. (Economics)	St. Stephen's	CEO and Director of DBS Group	
Rahul Bajaj	1958	B.A. (Economics)	St. Stephen's	billionaire businessman and chairman of the Bajaj Group	
Samir Jain			St. Stephen's	Vice-chairman and publisher, The Times Group	
Sanjeev Bikhchandani	1984	B.A. (Economics)	St. Stephen's	billionaire businessman; co-founder and CEO, Naukri.com	
Shikha Sharma			Lady Shri Ram	Managing Director and CEO of Axis Bank	
Siddhartha Lal	1994		St. Stephen's	CEO, Eicher Motors	
Vinita Bali	1975		Lady Shri Ram	Former Managing Director of Britannia Industries	
Vijay Shekhar Sharma			Delhi College of Engineering	billionaire businessman and founder of Paytm	
Viresh Oberoi			Hansraj College	Former CEO of Mjunction	
Vivek Chaand Sehgal				billionaire businessman and chairman of Motherson Sumi Systems	

== Educationists ==
Name	Class	Year	Degree	College	Notability	References
Paranjoy Guha Thakurta	—	—	B.A., M.A.	St. Stephen's; Delhi School of Economics	Director, School of Convergence	—
Sanjay Kumar	—	—	B.A. (Political Science)	Ramjas College	Former Director, Centre for the Study of Developing Societies	
Vivek Bhandari	—	—	—	St. Stephen's	Director, Institute of Rural Management, Anand	—
Vikas Divyakirti	—	—	B.A., M.A., M.Phil., Ph.D., LL.B.	Zakir Husain Delhi College; Hindu College, Delhi; Faculty of Law, University of Delhi	Founder of Drishti IAS, Former civil servant of Central Secretariat Service	

== Humanities and social sciences ==
Name	Class year	Degree	College	Notability	References
Arundhati Virmani			Indraprashtha	historian	
Gita Gopinath	1992; 1994	B.A.; M.A. (Economics)	Lady Shri Ram; Delhi School of Economics	Economic Counsellor of the International Monetary Fund	
Gauri Viswanathan		B.A.; M.A.		literary scholar; Class of 1933 Professor in the Humanities at Columbia University	
Ishtiaq Hussain Qureshi			St. Stephen's	historian	
Jasleen Dhamija			Miranda House	art historian	
Kapila Vatsyayan				art scholar; chairperson of IGNCA; recipient of the Padma Vibhushan	
Kaushik Basu			St. Stephen's	Former Chief Economist of the World Bank and Chief Economic Adviser to the Government of India	
Omkar Goswami	1978		Delhi School of Economics	Chairman and founder, CERG Advisor	
Partha Dasgupta	1962		Hansraj College	Professor Emeritus of Economics at the University of Cambridge	
Reenee Singh	1984;1990	B.A: M.A.(Psychology)	Lady Shri Ram College	Former Editor Journal of Family Therapy	
Ramnarayan Rawat				historian of South Asia	
Sanjay Jain	1986	B.A. (Economics)	St. Stephen's	Lecturer of Economics at the University of Oxford	
Upinder Singh			St. Stephen's	historian	
Usha Sanyal				historian	
Utsa Patnaik			Indraprashtha	Professor of Economics, Jawaharlal Nehru University	
Veena Das			Indraprashtha	Krieger-Eisenhower Professor of Anthropology at Johns Hopkins University	
Tsering Chungtak			Hindu College	Tibetan model, crowned Miss Tibet in 2006	

== Law ==
=== Supreme Court judges ===
Name	Class year	Degree	College	Notability	References
Arjan Kumar Sikri			Faculty of Law	former Judge of the Supreme Court of India, former Chief Justice of Punjab and Haryana High Court	
Hima Kohli		B.A. (History); LLB	St. Stephen's; Faculty of Law	former Judge of the Supreme Court of India, former Chief Justice of Hyderabad High Court	
Hrishikesh Roy	1982	B.A. LLB	Faculty of Law	Judge of the Supreme Court of India	
Indu Malhotra	1982	B.A. (Political Science); M.A. (Political Science); LLB	Lady Shri Ram; Faculty of Law	former Judge of the Supreme Court of India	
N. Kotiswar Singh	1983; 1986		Kirori Mal College; Faculty of Law	Judge of the Supreme Court of India	
Madan Lokur	1974; 1977	B.A.; LLB	St. Stephen's; Faculty of Law	former Judge of Supreme Court of India; former Chief Justice of Hyderabad High Court	
Madan Mohan Punchhi			Faculty of Law	28th Chief Justice of India	
Qadeeruddin Ahmed			St. Stephen's	former Judge of the Supreme Court of Pakistan	
Ranjan Gogoi		B.A. (History); LLB	St. Stephen's; Faculty of Law	46th Chief Justice of India	
Rohinton Fali Nariman		BCom; LLB	Shri Ram College of Commerce; Faculty of Law	former judge of the Supreme Court of India	
Sanjay Kishan Kaul	1982	LLB	Faculty of Law	former Judge of the Supreme Court of India, former Chief Justice of the High Court of Punjab and Haryana	
P. S. Narasimha	1988	LLB	Faculty of Law	Judge of the Supreme Court of India	
P. V. Sanjay Kumar	1988	LLB	Faculty of Law	Judge of the Supreme Court of India	
Sanjiv Khanna	1980; 1982	LLB	Faculty of Law	51st Chief Justice of India	
Vikramajit Sen			St. Stephen's; Faculty of Law	former Judge of the Supreme Court of India, former Chief Justice of the High Court of Karnataka	
Yogesh Kumar Sabharwal			Ramjas College; Faculty of Law	36th Chief Justice of India	
Yogeshwar Dayal	1953	LLB	Faculty of Law	former Judge of Supreme Court of India; former Chief Justice of Hyderabad High Court	
B. V. Nagarathna	1984	B.A. (History); LLB	Jesus and Mary College; Faculty of Law	former Judge of Supreme Court of India; former Judge of Karnataka High Court	

=== Others ===
Name	Class year	Degree	College	Notability	References
Abhilasha Kumari			Indraprashtha	Chief Justice on the Manipur High Court	
Ajit Prakash Shah			Ramjas College	Former Chief Justice of the Delhi High Court; Chairman of the 20th Law Commission of India	
Ashutosh Mohunta	1973; 1976	B.A. (History); LLB	Kirori Mal College; Faculty of Law		
Bishwajit Bhattacharyya			Faculty of Law		
Gopal Subramanium			Faculty of Law		
Gita Mittal			Lady Shri Ram	Chief Justice of Jammu and Kashmir High Court	
Pinky Anand			Lady Shri Ram; Faculty of Law		
Sidharth Luthra	1987; 1990		Hindu College; Faculty of Law	Former Additional Solicitor General of India	
T. Vaiphei			Faculty of Law	Chief Justice of Tripura High Court	

== Literature ==
Name	Class year	Degree	College	Notability	References
Ali Sardar Jafri			Zakir Hussain Delhi College	Urdu author and poet	
Alka Pande	1976	B.A. (Economics)	Jesus and Mary	author and museum curator	
Amitav Ghosh			St. Stephen's; Delhi School of Economics	English language author	
Anita Desai			Miranda House	writer	
Khushwant Singh			St. Stephen's	author best known for his novel Train to Pakistan; Padma Vibhushan recipient	
Kunzang Choden		B.A. (Psychology)		writer	
Mukul Kesavan			St. Stephen's	historian, novelist and political and social essayist	
Mohan Rana				Hindi poet	
Nabila Jamshed				writer	
Namita Gokhale		B.A. (English)		co-founder of Jaipur Literature Festival	
Narendra Kohli			Ramjas College	Hindi author	
Shauna Singh Baldwin	1982	BCom	Jesus and Mary	novelist	
Shiv Khera				writer	
Upamanyu Chatterjee			St. Stephen's	writer	

== Military ==
Name	Class year	Degree	College	Notability	References
Padmavathy Bandopadhyay			Kirori Mal College	air marshal in the Indian Air Force	
Sonam Wangchuk			Sri Venkateswara	colonel in the Indian Army; Kargil War veteran; Maha Vir Chakra recipient	
Sourendra Nath Kohli		B.A.	St. Stephen's	Former Chief of the Naval Staff in the Indian Navy	
Surinder Mehra				Former Chief of Air Staff in the Indian Air Force	
Syed Ata Hasnain	1972	B.A. (History)	St. Stephen's	retired lieutenant general in the Indian Army	

== Media ==
Name	Class year	Degree	College	Notability	References
Anna M. M. Vetticad	1994	BCom	Jesus and Mary	Former entertainment editor at India Today	
Pallavi Aiyar		B.A. (Psychology)	St. Stephen's	author and China correspondent of The Hindu College	
Rajat Sharma			Shri Ram College of Commerce	editor in chief of India TV, founder of Independence News Services, host of Aap Ki Adalat	
Swaminathan Aiyar			St. Stephen's	economist and Former editor of The Economic Times	
Niret J. Alva				television producer and CEO, Miditech	
Ambika Anand	2001	B.A. (Economics)	Jesus and Mary	Editor-in-Chief, fashion at NDTV Good Times	
Shereen Bhan				Delhi Bureau Chief and Executive Editor, CNBC-TV18	
Satinder Bindra				India Bureau Chief, CNN	
Romola Butalia				writer, author, website editor	
Shoma Chaudhury				ex-Managing Editor, Tehelka	
Prabhu Chawla				editor of India Today; host of Seedhi Baat on Aaj Tak	
Swapan Dasgupta	1975	B.A.	St. Stephen's	political analyst and journalist	
Vinod Dua			Hansraj College	journalist	
Bahar Dutt				columnist for CNN-IBN	
Barkha Dutt				television anchor and journalist	
Sagarika Ghose				news editor and columnist, CNN-IBN	
Arnab Goswami			Hindu College	editor-in-chief, Times Now, Republic tv	
Ramachandra Guha				writer and columnist	
Prem Shankar Jha				columnist; Former editor, The Hindu Collegestan Times	
Manoj Joshi				journalist, deputy editor, Mail Today	
Rini Simon Khanna				news anchor	
Mammen Mathew				editor and managing director, Malayala Manorama	
Rajiv Mehrotra				writer; television producer-director; documentary filmmaker	
Chandan Mitra				editor of The Pioneer	
Aroon Purie				editor-in-chief, India Today	
Nidhi Razdan			Lady Shri Ram	NDTV anchor	
Radhika Roy				co-founder of NDTV	
Nalini Singh				journalist, Doordarshan, known for her programme Aankhon Dekhi	
Chitra Subramaniam				journalist who broke the Bofors scandal story	
Salma Sultan				news anchor of Doordarshan	
Dibang			Rajdhani	anchor of ABP News, previously worked at Aaj Tak and NDTV	
Rahul Kanwal				news anchor, India Today, Aaj Tak and Business Today	
Sudhir Chaudhary		B.A.		consultant editor, Aaj Tak; Formerly worked at Zee News, WION and hosted DNA	
Ravish Kumar				Former senior executive editor at NDTV, Ramon Magsaysay Award and Red Ink Award winner	
Tanvir Gill	2012	BCom	Jesus and Mary	news anchor at CNBC	

== Politics and government ==
=== Heads of state and government ===
Name	Class year	Degree	College	Notability	References
Aung San Suu Kyi	1964	B.A. (Political Science)	Lady Shri Ram College	1st State Counsellor of Myanmar	
Bingu wa Mutharika	1961 1963	BCom M.A. (Economics)	Shri Ram College of Commerce; Delhi School of Economics	3rd President of Malawi	
G.P. Koirala			Kirori Mal College	30th Prime Minister of Nepal	
Khandu Wangchuk	1974		St. Stephen's	Former Prime Minister of Bhutan	
Muhammad Zia-ul-Haq	1943	B.A. (History)	St. Stephen's	6th President of Pakistan	
Narendra Modi	1978	B.A. (Political Science)	School of Open Learning	14th Prime Minister of India	
Salim Ahmed Salim	1968		St. Stephen's	4th Prime Minister of Tanzania	
Sangay Ngedup			St. Stephen's	Former Prime Minister of Bhutan	
Harini Amarasuriya	1994	B.A. (Sociology)	Hindu College	Prime Minister of Sri Lanka	

=== Other politicians and royalty ===
Name	Class year	Degree	College	Notability	References
Ajay Maken				Minister of Housing and Urban Poverty Alleviation	
Alka Lamba			Dyal Singh; St. Stephen's	Member of Legislative Assembly	
Ambika Soni			Indraprastha	Former Minister of Information and Broadcasting	
Amrita Meghwal				Member of Legislative Assembly	
Arun Jaitley	1973; 1977	BCom; LLB	Shri Ram College of Commerce; Faculty of Law	Former Minister of Defence and Minister of Finance	
Arun Shourie			St. Stephen's	Former Minister for Communications & Information Technology and Member of Parliament	
Arvinder Singh Lovely			Sri Guru Tegh Bahadur Khalsa College	Former Minister for Urban Development & Revenue, Education, Transport, Tourism, Languages, Gurudwara Election, Local Bodies & Gurudwara Administration	
Brahm Prakash			Ramjas College	first Chief Minister of Delhi	
Brinda Karat			Miranda House	Member of Parliament	
Chirag Paswan				Member of Parliament	
Devyani Rana				Member of the Nepalese royal family	
Emmanuel Blayo Wakhweya	1960			Ugandan Minister of Finance	
Gopalkrishna Gandhi			St. Stephen's	Former Governor of Bihar and Governor of West Bengal	
Gurmukh Nihal Singh			Ramjas College	fourth Principal of Ramjas College; second Chief Minister of Delhi	
Dr. Harsh Vardhan			Zakir Husain Delhi College	Minister of Health and Family Welfare since 2014, Chairman of the WHO Executive Board	
Holkhomang Haokip			Ramjas College	Member of Parliament	
Jai Parkash Aggarwal				Member of Parliament	
Jarbom Gamlin				Former Chief Minister of Arunachal Pradesh	
Kapil Sibal		LLB	Faculty of Law	Union Minister for Human Resource Development, Government of India	
Karan Singh	1961	PhD		1st Governor of Jammu & Kashmir	
Karni Singh			St. Stephen's	last titular maharaja of Bikaner	
Kiren Rijju		B.A.; LLB	Hansraj College; Faculty of Law	Member of Parliament	
Laxmi Narayan Yadav				Member of Parliament	
Madanlal Khurana			Kirori Mal College	Former Chief Minister of Delhi	
Mahesh Sharma			University College of Medical Sciences		
Manjinder Singh Sirsa			Sri Guru Tegh Bahadur Khalsa College	President of Delhi Sikh Gurdwara Management Committee	
Mani Shankar Aiyar		B.A. (Economics)	St. Stephen's	Member of Parliament	
Maneka Gandhi			Lady Shri Ram	Minister of Women and Child Development	
Mayawati	1975	B.A.; LLB	Kalindi; Faculty of Law	Former Chief Minister of Uttar Pradesh	
Mazel Ampareen Lyngdoh	2008	B.A. (English)	Jesus and Mary	Cabinet Minister, Government of Meghalaya	
Meenakshi Lekhi		BSc (Botany); LLB	Hindu College; Faculty of Law	Member of Parliament	
Meira Kumar			Indraprashta; Miranda House	Former Minister of Water Resources, Speaker of the Lok Sabha, and Indian presidential candidate in 2017	
Montek Singh Ahluwalia		B.A.	St. Stephen's	Deputy Chairman of the Planning Commission	
Murtaza Ali Khan			St. Stephen's	last titular nawab of Rampur	
Naresh Gujral				Member of Parliament	
Naveen Jindal	1990		Hansraj College	Member of Parliament	
Naveen Patnaik		B.A.	Kirori Mal College	Former Chief Minister of Odisha	
Pratap Keshari Deb	1992	B.A.	Ramjas College	Former Member of the Rajya Sabha	
Priyanka Gandhi	2010	B.A. (Psychology); M.A. (Buddhist Studies)	Jesus and Mary; Department of Buddhist Studies	general secretary of Indian National Congress	
Rahul Gandhi	did not graduate		St. Stephen's	Indian National Congress Member of Parliament (from Amethi Lok Sabha constituency)	
Rangarajan Kumaramangalam	1977		Kirori Mal College	Former Minister of Power	
R. K. Singh		B.A. (English)	St. Stephen's	Former Minister of Power	
Ranbir Singh Hooda	1937		Ramjas College	eminent politician from Rohtak; member of multiple Lok Sabhas	
Raninder Singh			St. Stephen's		
Ranjib Biswal			St. Stephen's	Member of Parliament	
Sachin Pilot		B.A.	St. Stephen's	Deputy Chief Minister of Rajasthan	
Salman Khurshid			St. Stephen's	Former Minister of External Affairs	
Sangeeta Kumari Singh Deo	1981	B.A. (Political Science)	Jesus and Mary	Member of Parliament	
Sarup Singh			Ramjas College	Former Governor of Gujarat and Governor of Kerala	
Satish Upadhyay		B.A. (Political Science)		Vice Chairman of New Delhi Municipal Council	
Shashi Tharoor		B.A. (History)	St. Stephen's	Minister of State for External Affairs; Former U.N. Under Secretary General	
Sheila Dikshit		M.A. (History)	Miranda House	Former Chief Minister of Delhi	
Smriti Irani			School of Open Learning	Former Minister of Information and Broadcasting and Minister of Human Resource Development	
Somnath Bharti		BSc Mathematics	Ramjas College	Former Law Minister of Delhi	
Subramanian Swamy			Hindu College		
Sucheta Kripalani			Indraprastha	Former Chief Minister of Uttar Pradesh, India's first woman Chief Minister	
Thupstan Chhewang	1967	B.A.; LLB	Ramjas College; Faculty of Law	Member of Parliament	
Tulsi Agarwal				Bharatiya Janata Party politician	
Virbhadra Singh		B.A.	St. Stephen's	Former Chief Minister of Himachal Pradesh	
Vijay Goel		MCom.	Shri Ram College of Commerce	Member of Parliament	
Vijay Jolly		BCom; MCom.	Shri Ram College of Commerce	MLA	
Syed Zafar Islam		Ph.D.		investment banker and Member of Parliament in the Rajya Sabha, Former Director at Deutsche Bank and spokesperson of Bharatiya Janata Party	

=== Civil servants ===
Name	Class year	Degree	College	Notability	References
Ajai Malhotra		B.A. (Economics); M.A. (Economics)	Hindu College; Delhi School of Economics	Ambassador of India to Russia	
Bhaskar Jyoti Mahanta		B.A. (Political Science)	Ramjas College	Director General of Police of Assam	
Ira Singhal			NSIT	Indian Administrative Service officer	
Javeed Ahmad			St. Stephen's	Director General of Police of Uttar Pradesh Police	
Lala Hardayal			St. Stephen's		
Kiran Bedi	1988	LLB	Faculty of Law	first woman to become an Indian Police Service officer	
Montek Singh Ahluwalia		B.A.	St. Stephen's	Deputy Chairman of the Planning Commission	
Najeeb Jung		B.A. (History); M.A. (History)	St. Stephen's	20th Lieutenant Governor of Delhi	
Navin Chawla	1966	B.A. (History)	St. Stephen's	Chief Election Commissioner of India; author of Mother Teresa's biography	
P. N. Dhar			Hindu College	principal secretary to Indira Gandhi's Prime Minister's office	
Pradeep Kumar Sinha			St. Stephen's; Delhi School of Economics	31st Cabinet Secretary of India	
S. Y. Quraishi			St. Stephen's	17th Chief Election Commissioner of India	
Shaktikanta Das		B.A. (History); M.A. (History)	St. Stephen's	25th Governor of the Reserve Bank of India	
Syeda Saiyidain Hameed	1963	B.A.	Miranda House	Former member of the Planning Commission of India	
Vinod Rai			Delhi School of Economics	11th Comptroller and Auditor General of India	
Vivekanand Sinha		B.A. in History	Ramjas College	Additional Director General of Police of Chhattisgarh	
Wajahat Habibullah	1965; 1967	B.A. (History); M.A. (History)	St. Stephen's	1st Chief Information Commissioner of India	
Poonam Gupta (Economist)	1991	B.A. (Economics); M.A. (Economics)	Hindu College Delhi School of Economics	Deputy Governor of Reserve Bank of India	

=== Diplomats ===
Name	Class year	Degree	College	Notability	References
Abhay Kumar			Kirori Mal College	Former Honorary Consul of India to Comoros	
Ajai Malhotra		B.A. (Economics); M.A. (Economics)	Hindu College; Delhi School of Economics	Former Ambassador of India to Russia	
Ajay Bisaria	1983	B.A. (Economics)	St. Stephen’s College	Former High commissioner of India to Pakistan	
Arindam Bagchi		BSc. (Mathematics)	St. Stephen’s College	Permanent Representative of India to the UN at Geneva	
Arun Kumar Singh		B.A. (Economics)		Former Ambassador of India to the United States	
Chandrashekhar Dasgupta		B.A. (Economics)		Former Ambassador of India to China	
Hardeep Singh Puri			Hindu College	Former Permanent Representative of India to the United Nations	
Harsh Vardhan Shringla		B.A.	St. Stephen’s College	33rd Foreign Secretary of India	
Jyotindra Nath Dixit		B.A. Honours M.A. (International Relations)	Zakir Husain College; Department of Political Science	2nd National Security Advisor of India; 18th Foreign Secretary of India	
K. P. S. Menon Jr.			St. Stephen’s College	15th Foreign Secretary of India	
Pankaj Saran		B.A. (Economics); M.A. (Economics)	Hindu College; Delhi School of Economics	Deputy National Security Advisor of India; Former Ambassador of India to Russia	
Pavan Varma		B.A. (History)	St. Stephen’s College	Former Ambassador of India to Bhutan	
Pooja Kapur				Former Ambassador of India to Bulgaria and Macedonia	
Preeti Saran			Lady Shri Ram	Former Ambassador of India to Vietnam	
Rakesh Sood		BSc. (Physics)	St. Stephen’s College	Former Ambassador of India to China	
Raminder Jassal				Former Ambassador of India to Israel	
Raveesh Kumar		B.A. (History)	Hansraj College	Ambassador of India in Czech Republic	
Riva Ganguly Das		M.A. (Political Science)	Department of Political Science	Former Secretary (East) Ministry of External Affairs	
Ruchira Kamboj		M.A. (Political Science)	Department of Political Science	Former Permanent Representative of India to the United Nations	
Salman Haidar			St. Stephen’s College	20th Foreign Secretary of India	
Shivshankar Menon		M.A. (History)	St. Stephen’s College	4th National Security Advisor of India; 27th Foreign Secretary of India	
S. Jaishankar	1977	B.Sc (Chemistry)	St. Stephen’s College;	31st Foreign Secretary of India; Current Minister of External Affairs of India	
Sujatha Singh			Lady Shri Ram; Delhi School of Economics	30th Foreign Secretary of India	
T. C. A. Raghavan			St. Stephen’s College	Former High commissioner of India to Pakistan	
Veena Sikri		M.A. (Economics)		Former High Commissioner of India to Bangladesh	
Vijay Keshav Gokhale		B.A. (History) M.A. (History)		32nd Foreign Secretary of India	
Vikram Doraiswami		M.A. (History)	Department of History	High Commissioner of India to the United Kingdom	
Vikram Misri		B.A. (History)	Hindu College	35th Foreign Secretary of India	

== Science and engineering ==
Name	Class year	Degree	College	Notability	References
Ajai K. Singh	1977	MSc; Ph.D. (chemistry)		Professor of chemistry; fellow Royal Society of Chemistry; member of American Chemical Society	
Ajoy Ghatak		MSc (Physics)		physicist; recipient of the Shanti Swarup Bhatnagar Prize	
Amolak Chand Jain	1948; 1950	BSc (Chemistry)		chemist; recipient of the Shanti Swarup Bhatnagar Prize	
Amit Dutt	1994; 1995	BSc (Botany); Diploma in Biochemical Technology		geneticist; recipient of the Shanti Swarup Bhatnagar Prize	
Amitabh Joshi		BSc (Botany); MSc (1988)		evolutionary biologist; recipient of the Shanti Swarup Bhatnagar Prize	
Amitava Raychaudhuri	1973	MSc (Physics)		particle physicist; recipient of the Shanti Swarup Bhatnagar Prize	
Anil Grover	1977; 1979	BSc; MSc		plant molecular biologist, N-Bios laureate	
Anil Kumar Tyagi				biochemist; recipient of the Shanti Swarup Bhatnagar Prize	
Apurva Sarin				cell biologist, N-Bios laureate	
Archana Bhattacharyya		BSc (Physics); MSc (Physics)		physicist; Director of the Indian Institute of Geomagnetism	
Asoke Nath Mitra	1947; 1949	BSc (Mathematics)	Ramjas College	physicist; recipient of the Shanti Swarup Bhatnagar Prize	
B. K. Misra	1980	M.S. (General Surgery)		neurosurgeon; recipient of the Dr. B. C. Roy Award, the highest medical honour in India	
Charusita Chakravarty		BSc (Chemistry)	St. Stephen's	Professor of chemistry at IIT Delhi; recipient of the Shanti Swarup Bhatnagar Prize	
Deepak Kumar			St. Stephen's	physicist; recipient of the Shanti Swarup Bhatnagar Prize	
Eknath Prabhakar Ghate			St. Stephen's	mathematician; recipient of the Shanti Swarup Bhatnagar Prize	
Gaiti Hasan	1976	BSc (Zoology)	Miranda House	molecular biologist	
Hirdaya Behari Mathur	1948			chemist; recipient of the Shanti Swarup Bhatnagar Prize	
Jogesh Pati	1957	MSc		physicist at the University of Maryland, College Park, recipient of the Dirac Medal	
Kasturi Lal Chopra	1952; 1954				
Meena Upadhyaya				medical geneticist	
N. A. Ramaiah				physical chemist; recipient of the Shanti Swarup Bhatnagar Prize	
Neena Mitter				Agricultural biotechnologist	
Pran Nath	1958			physicist at Northeastern University	
Raj Rewal	1954		Department of Architecture	architect	
Rajinder Kumar			Delhi College of Engineering	chemical engineer, Former Professor at the Indian Institute of Science	
Ravi Grover	1970		Delhi College of Engineering	nuclear scientist and mechanical engineer; Padma Shri recipient	
S. C. Jain				physicist; recipient of the Shanti Swarup Bhatnagar Prize	
Sampat Kumar Tandon	1972	PhD		geologist; recipient of the Shanti Swarup Bhatnagar Prize	
Sangeeta Malhotra	1988	BSc	Hansraj College	astrophysicist; Fellow of the American Astronomical Society	
Satish Chandra Maheshwari			St. Stephen's	molecular biologist; recipient of the Shanti Swarup Bhatnagar Prize	
Satish Kumar Gupta		BSc		immunologist; recipient of the Shanti Swarup Bhatnagar Prize	
Shasanka Mohan Roy	1960; 1962	BSc; MSc		quantum physicist; recipient of the Shanti Swarup Bhatnagar Prize	
Srinivasan Varadarajan	1952	PhD		chemist and Padma Bhushan awardee	
Subhash Chandra Lakhotia	1971			cytogeneticist; recipient of the Shanti Swarup Bhatnagar Prize	
Sushil Kumar	1960		Hansraj College	geneticist; recipient of the Shanti Swarup Bhatnagar Prize	
Usha Kehar Luthra			Lady Hardinge Medical College	pathologist and cytologist	
V. Balakrishnan			St. Stephen's	Professor of Physics at IIT Madras	
Vaidyeswaran Rajaraman	1952	BSc (Physics)	St. Stephen's	engineer, academic and writer, known for his pioneering efforts in the field of computer science education in India	
Vinod Dham		B.E. (Electrical Engineering)	Delhi College of Engineering	inventor of the Pentium chip	
V. K. Dadhwal		BSc (Botany)	Hansraj College	Director of Indian Institute of Space Science and Technology	

== Sports ==
Name	Class year	Degree	College	Sport	References
Aditi Chauhan			Jesus and Mary	Football	
Ajay Jadeja			Hindu College	Cricket	
Akash Chopra			Rajdhani	Cricket	
Aman Saini		B.A. Programme	Deen Dayal Upadhyaya College	Shooting	
Amoj Jacob	2019	BCom	Sri Guru Tegh Bahadur Khalsa	Athletics	
Anjum Chopra			St. Stephen's	Cricket	
Ankita Bhambri	2010	B.A. Programme	Jesus and Mary	Tennis	
Apurvi Chandela	2014	B.A. (Sociology)	Jesus and Mary	Shooting	
Arun Lal		BCom	St. Stephen's	Cricket	
Ashok Gandotra		M.A.	St. Stephen's	Cricket	
Ashish Nehra			Rajdhani	Cricket	
Dalima Chhibber			Jesus and Mary	Football	
Deep Dasgupta			Hindu College	Cricket	
Gautam Gambhir	did not graduate	B.A. Programme	Hindu College	Cricket	
Gaurav Bidhuri	2012		Kirori Mal College	Boxing	
Hari Gidwani			Hindu College	Cricket	
Jaspal Rana			St. Stephen's; Sri Aurobindo College	Shooting	
Kirti Azad	1981	B.A. (History)	St. Stephen's	Cricket	
Lalit Mathur	2017		Sri Guru Nanak Dev Khalsa College	Athletics	
Manika Batra	did not graduate	B.A. (Sociology)	Jesus and Mary	Table Tennis	
Maninder Singh			Sri Guru Tegh Bahadur Khalsa	Cricket	
Mansher Singh			St. Stephen's	Shooting	
Manu Bhaker	2022	B.A. (Political Science)	Lady Shri Ram	Shooting	
Manvinder Bisla			Hindu College	Cricket	
Maheshwari Chauhan	2017	B.A. (Philosophy)	Lady Shri Ram	Shooting	
Mohinder Amarnath			Sri Guru Tegh Bahadur Khalsa	Cricket	
Murali Kartik			Hindu College	Cricket	
Navdeep Singh	2021	B.A. (Hindi)	Sri Venkateswara	Javelin Throw	
Pincky Balhara	2019	B.A. Programme	Gargi College	Kurash	
Prachi Tehlan	2007	BCom	Jesus and Mary	Netball	
Prakash Bhandari			Hindu College	Cricket	
Pranav Soorma			Delhi School of Economics	Club Throw	
Prashanti Singh			School of Open Learning	Basketball	
Praveen Kumar			Ramjas College	Cricket	
Praveen Kumar	2022	B.A. Programme	Motilal Nehru	Athletics	
Pratima Singh	2010		Jesus and Mary	Basketball	
Raghbir Singh Bhola		B.E. (Electrical Engineering)	Delhi College of Engineering	Hockey	
Rajeshwari Kumari	did not graduate	B.A. Programme	Sri Venkateswara	Shooting	
Ramita Jindal	2025	BCom (Hons)	Hansraj College	Shooting	
Randhir Singh		B.A. (History)	St. Stephen's	Shooting	
Rishabh Pant		BCom	Sri Venkateswara	Cricket	
Rhythm Sangwan	2026	B.A. (English)	Lady Shri Ram	Shooting	
Saba Karim	1988	BCom (Hons)	Hindu College	Cricket	
Sanaa Bhambri			Jesus and Mary	Tennis	
Sandeep Chaudhary	2015	BSc (Botany)	Hansraj College	Javelin Throw	
Sandeep Sejwal			St. Stephen's	Swimming	
Sharad Kumar	2013	B.A. (Political Science)	Kirori Mal College	High Jump	
Shreyasi Singh	2012	B.A. Programme	Hansraj College	Shooting	
Shyam Lal Meena			Sri Guru Tegh Bahadur Khalsa	Archery	
Sumit Antil	2018	BCom	Ramjas College	Javelin Throw	
Sunil Valson			Hindu College	Cricket	
Tania Sachdev			Sri Venkateswara	Chess	
Unmukt Chand			St. Stephen's	Cricket	
Vijay Mehra			St. Stephen's	Cricket	
Vinay Lamba			Hindu College	Cricket	
Yogesh Kathuniya	2018; 2020	BCom; MCom	Kirori Mal College; School of Open Learning	Discus Throw	

== Notable faculty ==
Name	Affiliation	College	Notability	References
Amartya Sen	Professor of Economics (1963–1971)	Delhi School of Economics	Recipient of the Nobel Memorial Prize in Economic Sciences in 1998	
Anil Kumari Malhotra	Principal	Nehru Homoeopathic Medical College and Hospital	Padma Shri recipient (2016)	
Andre Beteille	Professor Emeritus of Sociology	Delhi School of Economics	Padma Bhushan recipient (2005)	
Ashok Mitra			Chief Economic Adviser to the Government of India and Member of Parliament	
Autar Singh Paintal	Principal	University College of Medical Sciences	Pioneered discoveries in the area of neurosciences and respiratory sciences	
Bhisham Sahni	Former Lecturer in English	Zakir Husain Delhi College	Author and playwright	
Debi Prasad Sarkar	Head of Biochemistry department	South Campus	Shanti Swarup Bhatnagar Prize recipient	
Govind Singh	Assistant Professor of Environmental Studies & Management	Cluster Innovation Centre; Indraprastha	Founder of Delhi Greens	
Indu Malhotra	Lecturer of Political Science	Miranda House	Judge of the Supreme Court of India	
Ishtiaq Hussain Qureshi	Lecturer in History (1928–1944)	St. Stephen's	Pakistani historian	
Jagdish N. Bhagwati	Professor of International Trade (1962–1968)	Delhi School of Economics		
Kamal Kumar Sethi	Former Professor of Cardiology		Padma Shri recipient	
Manmohan Singh	Professor of International Trade (1969–1971)	Delhi School of Economics	13th Prime Minister of India	
M. N. Srinivas	Founder of the sociology department	Delhi School of Economics	Sociologist	
Padma Desai	Associate Professor of Economics (1959–1968)	Delhi School of Economics	Professor of comparative economic systems, Columbia University	
Percival Spear	Lecturer in History (1924–1948)	St. Stephen's	Historian	
Pradip Krishen	Lecturer in History	Ramjas College	Eminent film-maker	
Pranab Bardhan	Professor (1973–1977)	Delhi School of Economics	Professor Emeritus of Economics at the University of California, Berkeley	
Ra'ana Liaquat Ali Khan	Professor of Economics	Indraprastha	Wife of the first Prime Minister of Pakistan, Liaquat Ali Khan	
Raj Krishna	Professor	Delhi School of Economics		
Ram Babu Gupta		Rajdhani College	first Indian umpire to umpire a World Cup final	
Rama Kant Shukla	Former reader	Rajdhani College	Padma Shri Awardee, Hindi and Sanskrit scholar	
Saleem Kidwai	Former Professor of History	Ramjas College	eminent gay rights activist	
Sampat Kumar Tandon	Former Pro-Vice Chancellor		Shanti Swarup Bhatnagar laureate	
Santosh Kumar Sen	Head of Postgraduate Studies	Maulana Azad Medical College	Indian surgeon and Padma Bhushan recipient	
Surendra Sheodas Barlingay	Chair of the Department of Philosophy		Logician and Marathi writer	
Sushil Kumar Saxena	Professor of Philosophy		Indian author, music critic, and exponent	
Tista Bagchi	Professor of Linguistics			
Tapan Raychaudhuri	Director of DSE, Head of the history department	Delhi School of Economics	Indian historian	
T. A. Venkitasubramanian	Head of the Department of Biochemistry	Vallabhbhai Patel Chest Institute	Shanti Swarup Bhatnagar Prize recipient	
Asoke Nath Mitra	Professor at Department of Physics and Astrophysics	Renowned Theoretical Physicist	Recipient Shanti Swarup Bhatnagar Prize	
Daulat Singh Kothari	Professor and Head of Department of physics and Astrophysics	Theoretical physicist, educationist	Padma Vibhushan Padma Bhushan	
Samarendra Nath Biswas	Professor at Department of Physics and Astrophysics	Theoretical Physicist	fellow of Indian National Science Academy, Indian Academy of Sciences, NASI	
Ramesh Chandra Majumdar (physicist)	Professor and Head of Department of Physics, University Of Delhi	Physicist	fellow of Indian National Science Academy	
