= Girjesh Govil =

Indian molecular biophysicist (1940–2021)

- Born: 25 September 1940; Uttar Pradesh, India
- Died: 12 October 2021 (aged 81); United States
- Education: Lucknow University; Allahabad University; Bhabha Atomic Research Centre; Tata Institute of Fundamental Research; University of Mumbai; National Physical Laboratory; National Research Council
- Known for: Studies on semi-empirical quantum chemical theories
- Awards: 1978 Shanti Swarup Bhatnagar Prize; FICCI Award; Goyal Award; P. C. Ray Memorial Award; N. R. Dhar Award; J. C. Ghosh Memorial Award; ISCA Lifetime Achievement Award; ICS Lifetime Achievement Award
- Scientific career
- Fields: Molecular biophysics
- Workplaces: National Institutes of Health; Kobe University; Tata Institute of Fundamental Research

Girjesh Govil (25 September 1940 – 12 October 2021) was an Indian molecular biophysicist and a Raja Ramanna professor at the Tata Institute of Fundamental Research. He was known for his researches on semi-empirical quantum chemical theories. He was an elected fellow of The World Academy of Sciences, and all the three major Indian science academies viz. the National Academy of Sciences, India, Indian National Science Academy and the Indian Academy of Sciences. The Council of Scientific and Industrial Research, the apex agency of the Government of India for scientific research, awarded him the Shanti Swarup Bhatnagar Prize for Science and Technology, one of the highest Indian science awards, in 1978, for his contributions to chemical sciences.

== Biography ==
Girjesh Govil, born to Mangalsen - Dharamdevi couple on 25 September 1940 at Khurja, a town in Bulandshahr district of the Indian state of Uttar Pradesh, known for traditional ceramics products, did his graduate studies in chemistry at Lucknow University in 1956 and completed his master's degree at Allahabad University in 1958. His career started at Bhabha Atomic Research Centre in 1959 but after a short while, he joined Tata Institute of Fundamental Research (TIFR) and while serving the institute, he did his doctoral studies under S. S. Dharmatti simultaneously to secure a PhD from Mumbai University in 1963.

Subsequently, he went abroad and did his post-doctoral studies at National Physical Laboratory (United Kingdom) and National Research Council. Returning to Tata Institute of Fundamental Research as a senior professor, he served as an INSA Golden Jubilee Research Professor there. In between, he had short stints at NRC, National Institutes of Health and Kobe University as a visiting scientist.

Govil was married to Anuradha Mithal and the couple has a son, Anurag and two daughters, Shalini and Shivani. He lived in Mumbai.

== Legacy ==
Govil got attracted to the then new field of nuclear magnetic resonance towards the beginning of his research career and most of his activities were focused on it. Working on the conformational aspects of biological molecules such as peptides, nucleotides, saccharides and lipids, he developed applications of semi-empirical quantum chemical theories and elucidated the structure of nucleotides using conformational energy maps and rotational energy states. His calculations of non-bonded and hydrogen-bonded interactions of biomolecules are reported to have been precise and he also made contributions on stacking and base pairing in ordered nucleic acids, lipid structures in biomembranes and their structural flexibility and transport properties. His researches are documented in over 250 articles published in peer-reviewed journals (Note: Please see Selected bibliography section) and five books which included NMR in Biological Systems: From Molecules to Human and NMR; he also contributed chapters to India in the World of Physics: Then and Now, authored by Asoke Nath Mitra and Science and Modern India: An Institutional History, edited by Das Gupta.

Govil has guided several doctoral scholars in their researches and has served as a TWAS professor at Kathmandu University. He has presided over the International Council for NMR in Biological Systems, the Indian Biophysical Society, the Indian Chemical Society and has served as the vice president of the International Union of Pure and Applied Physics. He has been associated with the Indian National Science Academy as the secretary of its council from 1989 to 1991 and as an additional member in 2002.

== Awards and honors ==
The Council of Scientific and Industrial Research awarded Govil the Shanti Swarup Bhatnagar Prize, one of the highest Indian science awards, in 1978. A Jawaharlal Nehru Birth Centenary Visiting Fellow of the Indian National Science Academy and a Raja Ramanna fellow at the Tata Institute of Fundamental Research, he has received several other awards and the list includes FICCI Award, Goyal Award, and the Lifetime Achievement Awards of the Indian Science Congress Association and the Indian Chemical Society. Besides being an elected fellow of The World Academy of Sciences, he was also an elected fellow of Indian National Science Academy, Indian Academy of Sciences and the National Academy of Sciences, India.

== Selected bibliography ==
=== Books ===
- Girjesh Govil; Ramakrishna V. Hosur (1981). NMR. Springer-Verlag. ISBN 978-0-387-10769-1.
- K.V.R. Chary; Girjesh Govil (8 April 2008). NMR in Biological Systems: From Molecules to Human. Springer Science & Business Media. ISBN 978-1-4020-6679-5.
- Asoke Nath Mitra (author), Girjesh Govil (contributor) (2009). India in the World of Physics: Then and Now. Pearson Education India. pp. 289–. ISBN 978-81-317-1579-6.
- Das Gupta (editor), Girjesh Govil (contributor) (2011). Science and Modern India: An Institutional History, c.1784-1947: Project of History of Science, Philosophy and Culture in Indian Civilization, Volume XV, Part 4. Pearson Longman. pp. 63–. ISBN 978-81-317-5375-0.

=== Articles ===
- Girjesh Govil (March 2007). "Govil, Girjesh: Nuclear Magnetic Resonance in India: A Historical Sketch". Encyclopedia of Magnetic Resonance. doi:10.1002/9780470034590.emrhp0067. ISBN 978-0-470-03459-0.
- E. Neu; M. C. Michailov; U. Welscher; J. Foltinova; Viktor Foltin; Dugble Martin; Erich Gornik; Girjesh Govil; S. Gupta; M. Sharma-Kaune; S. Kuznetsov; Dieter G. Weiss (June 2015). "On education and research in neurology Part I: necessity of regular implication of physiology". European Journal of Neurology. 22: 489. doi:10.1111/ene.12808.
- E. Neu; M. C. Michailov; U. Welscher; G. Werner; A. Werner-Srivastava; Girjesh Govil; S. Gupta; M. Sharma-Kaune; S. Kuznetsov; G. -R. Stainov; Dieter G. Weiss (June 2015). "On education and research in neurology Part II: regular congress reports on example of physiology". European Journal of Neurology. 22: 490. doi:10.1111/ene.12808.
- Ragini Sinha, Girjesh Govil (July 2016). "NMR studies of model biological membranes and whole cells". Journal- Indian Chemical Society. 93 (7): 689–692.

== See also ==
- Asoke Nath Mitra
- Quantum chemistry
