= Going Up =

Going Up may refer to:

- Going up and going down, terms in commutative algebra which refer to certain properties of chains of prime ideals in integral extensions
- Going Up (musical), a musical comedy that opened in New York in 1917 and in London in 1918
- Going Up (film), a 1923 film starring Douglas MacLean
- "Going Up" (TV episode), a 1990 episode of PBS's POV series
- Going Up (2007 film), starring Nandita Chandra
- "Going Up", a song by Echo & the Bunnymen from their 1980 album Crocodiles
- "Going Up", a common announcement played in elevators

== See also ==
- "Go Up", a song by SB19 from their 2019 album Get in the Zone
