= Anil Kumari Malhotra =

Indian homoeopathic physician

- Born: India
- Occupations: Homoeopathic physician Medical academic
- Known for: Homoeopathy
- Awards: Padma Shri

Anil Kumari Malhotra is an Indian homoeopathic physician, the principal of Nehru Homoeopathic Medical College, and Hospital of Delhi University. She is an alumna of the Shri Sai Nath Post Graduate Institute of Homeopathy from where secured MD in homoeopathy in 2006 and has been holding the position of the principal of Nehru Medical College since 1 August 2007. She is known to have published several medical papers, has conducted medical workshops, featuring her presentations and participated in many continuing medical education programs. The Government of India awarded her the fourth highest civilian honour of the Padma Shri, in 2016, for her contributions to medicine.

== See also ==
- List of University of Delhi people
