= T. A. Venkitasubramanian =

Indian biochemist

- Born: 1 January 1924; Thrissur, Kerala, India
- Died: 8 November 2003 (aged 79); Ottapalam, Kerala, India
- Education: Maharaja's College, Ernakulam; University of Madras; University of Madison, Wisconsin; Columbia University
- Known for: Biochemistry of Tubercle Bacillus
- Awards: 1968 Shanti Swarup Bhatnagar Prize
- Scientific career
- Fields: Medical biochemistry
- Workplaces: Indian Institute of Science; Vallabhbhai Patel Chest Institute; Institute of Genomics and Integrative Biology

Tathamangalam Ananthanarayanan Venkitasubramanian (1924–2003), popularly known as TAV, was an Indian biochemist, known for his researches on tuberculosis and the biochemistry of bacillus. He was a professor and the head of the department of biochemistry at Vallabhbhai Patel Chest Institute, Delhi. The Council of Scientific and Industrial Research, the apex agency of the Government of India for scientific research, awarded him the Shanti Swarup Bhatnagar Prize for Science and Technology, one of the highest Indian science awards, in 1968, for his contributions to biological sciences.

== Biography ==
Born in Thrissur district of the south Indian state of Kerala on 1 January 1924 to T. P. Ananthanarayana Iyer and Narayani Amma, Venkitasubramanian did his early schooling at a local school before securing his bachelor's (BSc) and master's (MSc) degrees from Maharaja's College, Ernakulam. He started his career at the Indian Institute of Science, Bengaluru, simultaneously doing his doctoral research at the University of Madras to secure a PhD in biochemistry in 1951. The next four years were spent in the US as a post-doctoral fellow at University of Madison, Wisconsin and Columbia University before returning to India to join Vallabhbhai Patel Chest Institute, Delhi as a senior research officer in 1956 and he stayed at the institute holding various positions till his superannuation as a professor and head of the department of biochemistry in 1988. After his official retirement, he served as an emeritus professor at Institute of Genomics and Integrative Biology (then known as the Centre for Biochemical Technology) till 1994. He was known to have done pioneering research on the biochemistry of tubercle bacilli and his researches assisted in the better understanding of the intermediary metabolism in cultured mycobacteria and in experimental tuberculosis models. (Note: His research findings have been used by others in their researches on mycobacterium.) His work also helped in understanding the biochemical pathology of tuberculosis. He also worked on Aspergillus parasiticus, a type of mold which produces aflatoxin and in the biosynthesis of those cancer-causing chemicals. He published over 250 articles in peer-reviewed journals, detailing his research findings; PubMed, an online knowledge repository have listed 247 of them. (Note: Search criterion: Venkitasubramanian T. A.)

The Council of Scientific and Industrial Research awarded Venkitasubramanian the Shanti Swarup Bhatnagar Prize for his contributions to biological sciences in 1968. He was married to L. Sarada, a biochemist, and the couple had two daughters, Viveka and Divya. The family was staying in Pune but moved later to Ottapalam in his home state where he died on 8 November 2003, succumbing to progressive supranuclear palsy.

== Selected articles ==
- T. V. Reddy; L. Viswanathan; T. A. Venkitasubramanian (September 1971). "High Aflatoxin Production on a Chemically Defined Medium". Applied and Environmental Microbiology. 22 (3): 393–396. doi:10.1128/AEM.22.3.393-396.1971. PMC 376320. PMID 5119206.
- K. K. Maggon; S. K. Gupta; T. A. Venkitasubramanian (December 1977). "Biosynthesis of aflatoxins". Bacteriol Rev. 41 (4): 822–855. doi:10.1128/MMBR.41.4.822-855.1977. PMC 414029. PMID 23090.
- S. N. Khan; K. K. Maggon; T. A. Venkitasubramanian (August 1978). "Inhibition of aflatoxin biosynthesis by tolnaftate". Appl Environ Microbiol. 36 (2): 270–273. Bibcode:1978ApEnM..36..270K. doi:10.1128/AEM.36.2.270-273.1978. PMC 291213. PMID 697362.
- Khan S. N.; Venkitasubramanian T. A. (February 1986). "Regulation of aflatoxin biosynthesis: effect of adenine nucleotides, cyclic AMP and N6-O2' -dibutyryl cyclic AMP on the incorporation of (1-14C)-acetate into aflatoxins by Aspergillus parasiticus NRRL-3240". J Environ Sci Health B. 21 (1): 67–85. Bibcode:1986JESHB..21...67K. doi:10.1080/03601238609372511. PMID 3011881.
- Masood R.; Venkitasubramanian T. A. (March 1988). "Purification and properties of aspartate transcarbamylase from Mycobacterium smegmatis". Biochim Biophys Acta. 953 (1): 106–113. doi:10.1016/0167-4838(88)90014-3. PMID 3342242.
- Chaturvedi A.; Khanna Y. P.; Taneja S. K.; Venkitasubramanian T. A.; Raj H. G. (November 1986). "Changes in liver polyamines due to aflatoxin B1". Toxicol Lett. 34 (1): 1–4. doi:10.1016/0378-4274(86)90138-4. PMID 3097877.

== See also ==
- Mycobacterium
- Bacillus
- List of University of Delhi people
