= Madras Cafe =

2013 Indian film by Shoojit Sircar

- Theatrical release poster
- Directed by: Shoojit Sircar
- Screenplay by: Somnath Dey; Shubendu Bhattacharya
- Dialogues by: Juhi Chaturvedi
- Story by: Somnath Dey; Shubendu Bhattacharya
- Produced by: John Abraham; Ronnie Lahiri; Sheel Kumar; Sudhanshu Vats
- Starring: John Abraham; Nargis Fakhri; Raashii Khanna; Siddharth Basu; Prakash Belawadi
- Cinematography: Kamaljeet Negi
- Edited by: Chandrashekhar Prajapati
- Music by: Shantanu Moitra
- Production companies: JA Entertainment; Rising Sun Films
- Distributed by: Viacom 18 Motion Pictures
- Release date: 23 August 2013
- Running time: 120 minutes
- Country: India
- Language: Hindi
- Budget: ₹35 crore
- Box office: ₹67 crore

Madras Cafe is a 2013 Indian Hindi-language political action thriller film directed by Shoojit Sircar and produced by John Abraham and Ronnie Lahiri under the banners JA Entertainment and Rising Sun Films. The film stars John Abraham, Nargis Fakhri and Raashii Khanna (in her film debut) in the lead roles. The film is set in the late 1980s and early 1990s, during the time of Indian intervention in the Sri Lankan civil war and Assassination of Rajiv Gandhi. The film revolves around an Indian soldier who is appointed by the intelligence agency R&AW to head covert operations in Northern Sri Lanka shortly after Indian peace-keeping force was forced to withdraw.

Madras Cafe was released on 23 August 2013, to positive reviews from critics. The film was declared as an above average grosser at the box office. The film won the National Film Award for Best Audiography for Nihar Ranjan Samal and Bishwadeep Chatterjee at the 61st National Film Awards.

== Plot ==
The plot opens in Jaffna, Sri Lanka, where a bus full of Tamil passengers is stopped by armed Sinhalese men and all are massacred.

A man in Kasauli, revealed to be Vikram Singh sees on TV that the Sri Lankan President has been killed by a suicide bomber. In a nearby church he confesses to Priest, "Our Prime Minister could have been saved from the conspiracy." and Vikram starts narrating his story to the priest.

The film then moves five years back, where clashes between the Sri Lankan Government Forces and Tamil militant groups had reached a dangerous level. The Tamil youth have taken weapons and joined the Liberation Tamil Front (LTF) leader Anna ("Elder Brother" in Tamil) Bhaskaran (a character based on the real-life LTTE leader Velupillai Prabhakaran). The Indian Prime Minister (Sanjay Gurubaxani) decides to sign a peace accord with the Sri Lankan Government. However, Anna refuses to accept the accord, and the Indian Peacekeeping Forces are forced to withdraw from the island. Robin Dutt, aka RD, the R&AW chief, calls upon his best man, Maj. Vikram Singh.

After meeting and discussing the strategy with RD and his deputy Swaroop (Avijit Dutt), Vikram travels to Sri Lanka and meets a war correspondent, Jaya Sahni. After reporting to his senior Balakrishnan (based on real-life person K V Unnikrishnan), he tries to find someone who may help to find Shri, the only man who can withstand and oppose Anna. Vikram manages to visit Shri and promises Shri to help him rise against Anna by providing him with arms. However, the deal goes terribly wrong, and one of Vikram's associates is killed in a surprise attack by LTF, who do away with the weapons consignment.

Meanwhile, Vikram is kidnapped by LTF. The Indian government sends forces and rescues Vikram. Balakrishnan tells him to leave Sri Lanka as he is on the hit list of both camps. Vikram feels suspicious about Balakrishnan. He calls SP, one of his associates, and tells him to report all activities of Balakrishnan. Vikram, posing as a war correspondent, meets Mallayya (based on real-life LTTE member Gopalaswamy Mahendraraja), second-in-command of Anna, and persuades him to meet RD in Colombo. RD instigates Mallaya to stand up as the only champion of his people, thus dividing the LTF in two.

The Indian military then launches a massive attack on the LTF base camp, However, Anna survives and later kills Malaya and Shri. In the light of the resurfaced violence, the Indian Prime Minister resigns. Some months later, SP later tracks some discussion of Anna over the phone and tells Balakrishnan about this, but Bala tells him to ignore them, causing SP to believe that Balakrishnan might be a mole. He escapes with the intercepts and files of the case. Vikram receives a call from SP, who tells him to meet him. After meeting with SP, Vikram comes home to find Ruby, his wife, murdered. Vikram nabs Vasu from a theatre and asks him what he knows. Vasu tells him that indeed Balakrishnan was a leak, and he was helping him and Reed. Vikram calls Jaya and requests for help from her sources.

As told by Jaya, Vikram reaches Bangkok, where a source of Jaya (Dibang) tells him that he has a tape. Vikram is shocked to see that Balakrishnan was honeytrapped, forcing him to divulge all the information about their movements. Balakrishnan later commits suicide by shooting himself.

Back in Delhi, RAW had decoded the intercepts realizes that this might be a Code Red to assassinate the ex-Prime Minister. A massive manhunt begins, and hundreds of LTF associates are nabbed by Indian security forces and local cops. In the Madras R&AW tracks down the conversation of Vijayan Joseph, a bombmaker, and Anna. Vikram finds that Kannan Kanan, an associate of Anna's man Kanda, is in Madurai Jail and might be helpful. Kannan reveals that some suspicious refugees came from the island to Tamil Nadu.

After a short meeting with Jaya, Vikram sees X on a clock at the airport and deduces that the LTF is going to assassinate the ex-PM on the same day at X PM (10 PM). RD then calls the ex-PM to cancel his rally, but he replies that he'll be alright. Vikram then manages to catch Vijayan joseph from his hideout, who tells him that the refugees are going to assassinate the ex-PM with plastic explosives, which are untraceable by metal detectors.

Vikram rushes to the place where the ex-PM is taking part in the rally, but the suicide bomber manages to put the wreath on the neck of the ex-PM, and while bowing down, she pulls the trigger and kills him along with herself and many others. Vikram feels dejected and defeated. Later, Vikram submits his report on the assassination to the investigation committee. A few days later, RD too resigns, and Vikram, after taking voluntary retirement, comes to Kasauli.

The film comes back to the present, where the priest asks Vikram who won the battle. Vikram says he doesn't know, but in this battle, the Indians lost their Prime Minister, and the Sri Lankans lost their future. He later walks away, reciting the lines, "Where the mind is without fear." He completes another report and sends it to Jaya in London, who starts her work on that report; In Kasauli, Vikram is seen coming out of the house he was living in.

The end credits reveal that many Sri Lankan Tamils remain displaced abroad till this date.

== Cast ==
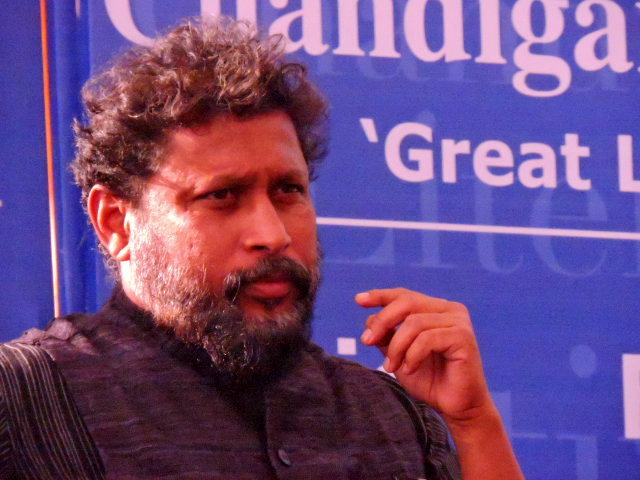
Director Shoojit Sircar

- John Abraham as Major Vikram Singh (Indian army officer appointed by the Research & Analysis Wing to carry out covert operations in Jaffna). Singh is fictitious, Sircar said he had "used real references, portrayed militant groups, revolutionary freedom fighters, Indian Peace Keeping Forces and shown how India got involved and the chaos". "I didn't want to make glitzy thriller like Ek Tha Tiger or Agent Vinod, which seem inspired by the James Bond template. I want to show that intelligence officers are ordinary people who live amongst us. It is only that they have to solve issues where national security is at stake," says Sircar. Sircar says he needed an actor who can easily get lost in the crowd, but with John Abraham, it seems next to impossible. "The role also requires a certain level of physicality and John Abraham has worked for the role. I agree this is a new territory for him but I think he has pitched it right. Let's see how the audiences take him."
- Nargis Fakhri as Jaya Sahni (a British war correspondent in Sri Lanka, inspired by many war correspondents, including Anita Pratap) As for Fakhri, Sircar says her voice has not been dubbed. "Nargis Fakhri is playing a foreign war correspondent. I needed a girl who looks like an Indian journalist but has an accent so there is no chance that the audience will remember her Rockstar performance while watching Madras Café. She will converse in English and she is familiar with the language," says Sircar.
- Raashii Khanna as Ruby Singh, wife of Major Vikram Singh
- Siddhartha Basu as Robin Dutt (RD), chief of Research & Analysis Wing. He is Major Singh's mentor and appoints him to take sole responsibility of executing the covert operations in Sri Lanka
- Ajay Rathnam as Anna Bhaskaran, the leader of the fictional LTF militant group. The character closely resembles the Liberation Tigers of Tamil Eelam leader Velupillai Prabhakaran. Bhaskaran is the given name of the character. 'Anna' meaning elder brother in Tamil, is an honorific prefixed to the name of the character Bhaskaran.
- Prakash Belawadi as Bala, Major Vikram Singh's superior in Jaffna. Due to his long stint in Sri Lanka, Bala is the only one who has first-hand information on the reality of the situation. As Major Singh arrives to execute his covert operation, Bala and his team help him to get access to locations and people who are crucial to making the operation successful. Bala was inspired by a real-life R&AW mole known as KV Unnikrishnan. KV Unnikrishnan, the agency's station chief in Chennai in 1987, was honey-trapped by the CIA. The US spy service threatened to reveal Unnikrishnan's compromising photographs with an air hostess to force him to co-operate.
- Avijit Dutt as Swaroop, RD's deputy in R&AW.
- Tinu Menachery as a Tamil rebel
- Agnello Dias as a Sri Lankan minister
- Dinesh Prabhakar as Rajasekharan, LTF member
- Sanjay Gurbaxani as Former Prime Minister of India
- Piyush Pandey as the Cabinet Secretary of India
- Aayam Mehta as Vasu
- Dibang as a former intelligence officer
- Leena Maria Paul as a R&AW Decoder

== Production ==
=== Background ===
As per John Abraham, "Madras Cafe brings us closer to what changed the political history of India." The film, set in India and Sri Lanka, is a political spy thriller with the backdrop of the Sri Lankan Civil War. Major Vikram Singh (John Abraham) is an Indian Army Special Forces officer who is appointed by the intelligence agency Research and Analysis Wing to head covert operations in Jaffna shortly after the Indian peace-keeping force was forced to withdraw. As he journeys to Sri Lanka with the intention of disrupting the LTTE militants, he becomes entangled military & politics. There he meets a British journalist Jaya Sahni (Nargis Fakhri) who wants to reveal the truth about the civil war, and in the process he uncovers a conspiracy to assassinate the former Indian prime minister, Rajiv Gandhi, through the use of plastic explosives. Although Vikram tries, at 10:10 pm, an LTTE suicide bomber kills the ex-PM while bowing down to put a garland on his neck.

=== Development ===
“If I would have gone with this script to anyone else, they would have rejected it because of the kind of sensitivity the subject has. I don't want to name them, but three of them have already done it. Nobody was ready to produce the film... it's very daring of John Abraham and Viacom 18 Motion Pictures to back up this project," director Sircar told the press after the release of the film. John Abraham said that director Shoojit Sircar narrated the script of Madras Cafe to him in 2006 but could not get around to begin it. "After our last film together, we decided to get back to doing where we started off from. That's the story behind Madras Cafe," he said.

Sircar stated, "The film is a work of fiction, but it is based on research into real events, it has a resemblance to actual political events, dealing with civil war and the ideology of a militant group."

=== Title ===
The film was initially titled Jaffna after the northern Sri Lankan city. It was renamed Madras Cafe, as the plot to kill Gandhi was hatched at the café. The original location of the café is not specified in the film.

=== Casting ===
John Abraham, the lead actor and one of the producers of the film, plays the main lead, Vikram Singh, a military officer who is sent to Jaffna to head RAW's covert operations. "I had to lose a lot of muscle because these officers look like regular people. When they are in a crowd, they are completely inconspicuous," says Abraham. Commenting on remarks comparing his look to Tom Hanks in Cast Away, he said: "Deciding on my look for the movie was quite challenging. It took a lot of brain storming and we finalized this messy look, which apparently you think is inspired by Tom Hanks, but actually, it's not."

American model-turned-actress Nargis Fakhri was cast to play Jaya Sahni, a British journalist in Jaffna. For the role of the foreign war correspondent, Fakhri was chosen because the director required "a girl who looked Indian but had an [English] accent". Thus this was the first film where her voice was not dubbed. Initially, American-based actress Freida Pinto was chosen to portray Jaya Sahni, but due to prior commitments she withdrew from the project.

Shoojit Sircar contacted model Sheetal Mallar for the film, but as things did not work out, newcomer Rashi Khanna was signed for the role, marking her debut. The cast also included a number of non-professional actors, such as quiz master Siddharth Basu, filmmaker Prakash Belawadi and journalist Dibang.

=== Filming ===
Madras Cafe was shot in Malaysia, Thailand, London and India. The Sri Lankan scenes of the film were shot in India, where the city of Jaffna and large parts of inner Sri Lanka were recreated. "We knew we couldn't shoot this in Sri Lanka, so we shot most of it in Tamil Nadu and Kerala and converted it into a war zone. The second part of the film is based in India, which is the politics part," said Sircar. The first schedule of the film was shot extensively in southern India. The second schedule was shot in Mumbai, outside India and in and around south India. Several civil war scenes were shot in Bangkok as light machine gun fire was not permitted in India. Real AK-47s, 9mm Berettas and M60s were used, for which special permission was obtained from the local authorities.

The trailer was released on 12 July 2013. The film was also dubbed in Tamil.

== Soundtrack ==
Madras Cafe

Soundtrack album by Shantanu Moitra
- Released: 6 August 2013
- Recorded: 2013; Media Minds India. Pvt. Ltd Mumbai.
- Genre: Feature film soundtrack
- Language: Hindi
- Label: T-Series
- Producer: Shantanu Moitra

Shantanu Moitra chronology
Inkaar (2013)	Madras Cafe (2013)	Ente (2013)

The film's soundtrack is composed by Shantanu Moitra, and lyrics are written by Ali hayat, Zebunissa Bangash and Manoj Tapadia

Madras Cafe
No.	Title	Lyrics	Singer(s)	Length
1.	"Sun Le Re"	Ali Hayat	Papon	5:11
2.	"Ajnabi"	Bilal Sami	Zebunissa Bangash	5:17
3.	"Khud Se"	Manoj Tapadia	Papon	4:49
4.	"Sun Le Re (Reprise)"	Ali Hayat	Papon	3:58
5.	"Madras Cafe Theme"		Instrumental	4:04
6.	"Conspiracy"		Instrumental	3:07
7.	"Entry to Jaffna"		Instrumental	1:06
8.	"Title Theme"		Instrumental	3:16
Total length:				30:46

== Release ==
The film was released on 23 August in India, the United States and United Arab Emirates. However, it was not released in the United Kingdom and Canada as planned owing to the protests by Tamil diaspora in regards to its depiction of the Tamil militants, nor in Tamil Nadu where exhibitors feared its release was not worth the risk in regards to the controversy.

== Reception ==
=== Critical reception ===
The film was critically acclaimed. The Times of India called the film political, tense and explosive. The daily praised the film's research, story and "remarkable" cinematography, remarking "Madras Cafe dives boldly into terrain Bollywood hasn't touched before. It highlights India's ambiguous role, moving sensitively, taking no sides, except those of relationships involving respect – but no romance – between Vikram Singh and Jaya Sahni, duty, victory and loss." Reviewing for the Hindustan Times, Anupama Chopra wrote "Madras Café works as an effective portrait of the futility of war. Shoojit Sircar and his writers, Shubhendu Bhattacharya and Somnath Dey, ably illustrate why there are no winners here. Ideologies are marred by corruption and brutality. Death is inevitable and victories, pyrrhic."

The Hindu praised director Sircar, saying, "For long, Hindi films made us believe that it is only Pakistan that we have to deal with. Shoojit Sircar touches base with Sri Lanka and unravels the complex 'Tamil problem' as many living North of the Vindhyas call it. Keeping the jingoistic flavour aside, he plays the game of shadows as it is played with all its muck and grime. His hint at a larger conspiracy of a syndicate with business interests in the region echoes what Agent Vinod also hinted at, but Sriram Raghavan got carried away with the demands of the box office. Sircar chooses to keep it closer to reality." Baradwaj Rangan later wrote in The Hindu, "Madras Café is not a comforting fantasy. It is the journey of any Indian operative who got wind of the fact that Rajiv Gandhi was going to be assassinated and did his damnedest to prevent it. The journalist in this film, for instance, is not the kind of cardboard cut-out we find in Madhur Bhandarkar and Prakash Jha films, but someone who has to decide between naming a source (and going against the ethics of her profession) and aiding an investigation."

Rajeev Masand of CNN-IBN also praised Sircar, opining, "Unlike, in the West, it's hard to make films on real-life historical events in India. Political pressures and sensitive groups invariably throw a spanner in the works. Which is why it's commendable what director Shoojit Sircar has undertaken with Madras Café."

The Pakistani newspaper Dawn gave the film a positive review by saying, "Shoojit Sircar's human-drama of politics, rebellion, genocide and spy-games adapts Indian prime minister Rajiv Gandhi's assassination plot, and the Sri Lankan civil war with sweaty palms and a gawky breakneck pace. And yet, for all its clumsy footing, at times, half-intelligent writing, it is engaging". The daily concludes that "For all its speed and embedded seriousness about global conflict, the nature of war, consequences and international trade, Madras Café's lack of braves turns it into mellow spy-thriller. And trust me, the words "mellow" and "spy-thriller" do not gel."

Sircar garnered positive reviews for his story and direction. "Watching Nargis Fakhri embodying the cliché of a writer hammering away at a typewriter with a cigarette stuck between her lips is a visual joke for the ages." The Hindu wrote in a later analysis, "The Tamil spoken in the film isn't Sri Lankan Tamil but the language you hear on the streets of Chennai – an odd gaffe for a film filled with so much research."

=== Box office ===
Madras Cafe finished its theatrical run at the box office with average numbers. The film, which ruled the box office in its first week, saw a fall in business in its second week due to the release of Satyagraha. However, the film still fetched ₹86.3 million (US$900,000) in its second week, taking the grand total to ₹427 million (US$4.4 million).

Madras Cafe has not fared well in terms of overseas box office collections. In the US and Australia, it has grossed around 56 million INR.

== Controversy ==
=== Depiction of Sri Lankan Rebels ===
The film's alleged negative depiction of rebels in the Sri Lankan civil war raised concerns. After the release of the trailer, Tamil political parties Naam Tamilar besides Pattali Makkal Katchi called for a ban on the film, citing that it depicts the members of Liberation Tigers of Tamil Eelam as terrorists. Seeman stated the heart of the movie is anti-Tamil and Prabhakaran is portrayed as villainous, also remarking that they would stop screenings of the film after a special preview was arranged for pro-Tamil outfits. MDMK party chief Vaiko sought a ban on the movie from the centre. DMK party chief M Karunanidhi asked the Tamil Nadu government to enquire if the film portrayed Sri Lankan Tamils in a poor light and if so, to take proper action. Replying to the ban demands, John Abraham said while he respects the opinions of everyone, no one is above the Censor board and creativity should not be held at gun point. Mumbai BJP president Ashish Shelar said "the film is an effort to glorify a particular political party and its leaders by demeaning [an]other sect of people. This cannot be permitted", and threatened to stall the release of the film in Mumbai.

The Madurai bench of Madras High Court dismissed a petition to ban the film, although it accepted a similar petition to ban the film in Tamil Nadu—to cancel the clearance certificate by the Central Board of Film Certification (CBFC) and send notices to the director and producers of the film, Tamil Nadu Director General of Police, the chairman of the CBFC. The hearing was posted on 21 August. The petition also claimed that Sri Lankan president Mahinda Rajapaksa secretly financed the film to justify the human rights violations during the final stages of the war. Upon hearing the arguments, the court refused to grant an interim injunction to prevent the release of the Hindi version, while noting the Tamil version should not be released without the CBFC's clearance, which was later obtained. It also issued notices to DGP, producer to give a detailed reply on charges by 3 September. John Abraham has already refuted claims about Rajapaksa financing the film earlier during a promotional event.

Following protests by the Tamil diaspora in the United Kingdom and negative feedback alleging that the film promoted anti-Tamil prejudices, several theatres chose not to screen the film.

== Awards and nominations ==
In September 2013, Abraham's role as a RAW agent won him the "Pride of the Nation" award, given by the Anti-Terrorist Front, for "his attempt to raise the sensitive issue of former Prime Minister Rajiv Gandhi's assassination". The film was given Ramnath Goenka Memorial Award at 20th Screen Awards in January 2014. At the 6th Mirchi Music Awards, Shantanu Moitra won Background Score of the Year award.

Date of ceremony	Awards	Category	Recipient(s) and nominee(s)	Result	Ref.
18 December 2013	BIG Star Entertainment Awards	Most Entertaining Social Drama Film	John Abraham, Shoojit Sircar	Nominated	
18 December 2013	BIG Star Entertainment Awards	Most Entertaining Thriller Film	John Abraham, Shoojit Sircar	Nominated	
18 December 2013	BIG Star Entertainment Awards	Most Entertaining Actor in a Social Drama Film – Male	John Abraham	Nominated	
18 December 2013	BIG Star Entertainment Awards	Most Entertaining Actor in a Thriller Film – Male	John Abraham	Nominated	
18 December 2013	BIG Star Entertainment Awards	Most Entertaining Actor in a Social Drama Film – Female	Nargis Fakhri	Nominated	
14 January 2014	Star Screen Awards	Ramnath Goenka Memorial Award	Madras Cafe	Won	
14 January 2014	Star Screen Awards	Best Film	John Abraham, Shoojit Sircar	Nominated	
14 January 2014	Star Screen Awards	Best Director	Shoojit Sircar	Won	
14 January 2014	Star Screen Awards	Best Actor (Popular Choice)	John Abraham	Nominated	
14 January 2014	Star Screen Awards	Best Actor in a Negative Role	Prakash Belawadi	Nominated	
14 January 2014	Star Screen Awards	Best Cinematography	Kamaljeet Negi	Nominated	
14 January 2014	Star Screen Awards	Best Action	Manohar Verma	Won	
14 January 2014	Star Screen Awards	Best Editing	Chandrashekar Prajapati	Nominated	
14 January 2014	Star Screen Awards	Best Production Design	Vinod Kumar	Nominated	
14 January 2014	Star Screen Awards	Best Sound Design	Bishwadeep Chatterjee	Nominated	
16 January 2014	Producers Guild Film Awards	Best Supporting Actress	Raashii Khanna	Nominated	
16 January 2014	Producers Guild Film Awards	Best Female Debut	Raashii Khanna	Nominated	
16 January 2014	Producers Guild Film Awards	Best Sound Mixing	Bishwadeep Chatterjee	Won	
16 January 2014	Producers Guild Film Awards	Best Editing	Chandrashekar Prajapati	Won	
24 January 2014	Filmfare Awards	Best Cinematography	Kamaljit Negi	Won	
24 January 2014	Filmfare Awards	Best Sound Design	Bishwadeep Chatterjee, Nihar Ranjan Samal	Won	
8 February 2014	Zee Cine Awards	Best Screenplay	Shoojit Sircar	Nominated	
8 February 2014	Zee Cine Awards	Best Visual Effects	Madras Cafe	Nominated	
8 February 2014	Zee Cine Awards	Best Sound Design	Bishwadeep Chatterjee	Won	
8 February 2014	Zee Cine Awards	Best Editing	Chandrashekar Prajapati	Nominated	
27 February 2014	Mirchi Music Awards	Background Score of the Year	Shantanu Moitra	Won	
3 May 2014	National Film Awards	Best Audiography (Location Sound Recordist)	Nihar Ranjan Samal	Won	
3 May 2014	National Film Awards	Best Audiography (Sound Designer)	Bishwadeep Chatterjee	Won	

== See also ==
- Assassination of Rajiv Gandhi
- 2009 Tamil diaspora protests
- Kuttrapathirikai
- The Terrorist
- Kannathil Muthamittal
