= Bidhu Bhushan Ray =

Indian physicist (1894-1944)

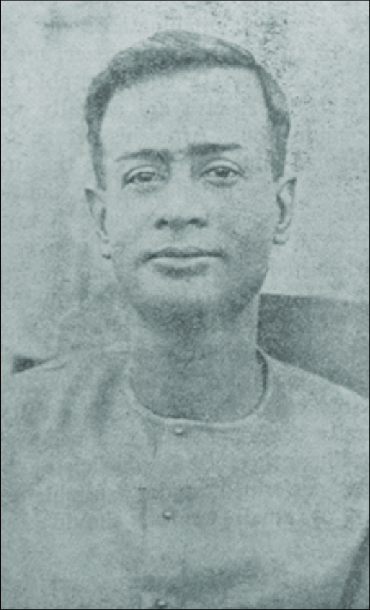
- Born: 1 July 1894; Khadarpara, British India
- Died: 29 July 1944 (aged 50); Calcutta, India
- Education: Rajabazar Science College; Calcutta University
- Known for: X-ray spectroscopy; scattering of light
- Scientific career
- Fields: Physics
- Workplaces: Rajabazar Science College; Calcutta University
- Doctoral advisor: C. V. Raman

Bidhu Bhushan Ray (also Bidhu Bhusan Ray, Bidhubhusan Ray and B. B. Ray) was an Indian physicist. He was a pioneer in the field of X-ray spectroscopy, and his laboratory was the first of its kind in India. Also notable are his contributions to studies related to scattering of light in the atmosphere. He played a significant role in facilitating contacts between Indian and European scientists. He was elected Fellow, Indian National Science Academy, and held the post of Khaira Professor of Physics at the Rajabazar Science College, University of Calcutta until the time of his death.

== Early life ==
Bidhu Bhushan Ray was born on 1 July 1894 in Khadarpara, East Bengal, British India (now in Bangladesh). He completed his studies in Calcutta. His doctoral thesis was on the scattering of light in the atmosphere, carried out under the guidance of C. V. Raman. He obtained his D.Sc. in 1922. As part of his doctoral work, he gave a theory of glories, coronas and iridescent clouds, which is still considered relevant.

== Career ==
In 1921, Ray was appointed as lecturer in physics at the University College of Science and Technology, University of Calcutta, where he would remain until his death. In 1923, he secured two years of leave to travel to Europe. He spent a few months working with Manne Siegbahn in Uppsala, where he started experimental work in X-ray spectroscopy. He then moved to Copenhagen to work with Niels Bohr, to whom Raman had already introduced him. Ray spent over a year in Copenhagen, doing theoretical work related to X-ray spectra. After leaving Copenhagen, he visited a number of other laboratories in Germany and Italy before returning to India.

Inspired by his stay in Europe, Ray decided to set up a laboratory for X-ray spectroscopy, which would be the first of its kind not only in Calcutta but in India. It was not easy to get the necessary financial support from the University of Calcutta. Bohr wrote as many as three letters to the university authorities recommending Ray's case for funding. In one of them he wrote: "..Dr. Ray must be considered as unusually qualified for such work (X-ray spectra and their interpretation), ... having ... a thorough knowledge of the present stand of the theories"

Ray was finally able to set up his research laboratory in 1927–28. Over the next fifteen years, he published a number of research papers in leading journals. Along with his work on X-ray spectroscopy, he also continued his meteorological studies. His laboratory became a training ground for young physicists, e.g. R. C. Majumdar. In 1935 he was appointed to the prestigious chair of Khaira Professor of Physics, a position he held until his untimely death.

== Controversy ==
From 1930 onwards, Ray was involved in a scientific controversy. After the discovery of the Raman Effect, there was considerable international interest in trying to observe an analogous effect in X-rays. Researchers in the US and Germany had tried and reported negative results. In 1930, Bidhu Bhushan Ray reported, in a paper published in Nature, that he had observed additional spectral lines in scattered X-rays, which he interpreted as being analogous to Raman's observations. Immediately afterwards, J. M. Cork reported that he was unable to reproduce Ray's result. Ray wrote a rebuttal, and followed it up with more experimental work. The controversy continued for several years, and was finally settled in 1937 by Arnold Sommerfeld, who confirmed Ray's observations and also gave a detailed explanation of the phenomenon.

== Death ==
Bidhu Bhushan Ray died of a heart attack on 29 July 1944, less than a month after his fiftieth birthday. Some of his family members believe that the controversy mentioned above was directly responsible for his death. Oral history has it that a demonstration was set up in his laboratory, where some colleagues and visitors were to be shown the extra spectral lines. When the visitors arrived, the demonstration did not work. Ray was ridiculed for this failure, and the resulting humiliation precipitated his heart attack. However, researcher Rajinder Singh, on the basis of his study of original documents, argues that this is not likely. He points out that the controversy had already been resolved in 1937, following Sommerfeld's work, more than six years before Ray's death. Moreover, the experiment required many hours of running time. Thus visual demonstration was not possible. Singh further notes that Ray had developed malaria and other ailments, which may have played a role in his early death.

== Other contributions ==
Apart from his teaching and research work, Ray was also interested in the dissemination of science to a wider audience. He was a founding member and Secretary of the Indian Science News Association, established in 1935. He edited its journal, Science and Culture.

== Awards and honours ==
- Elected Fellow, National Institute of Science of India (later renamed Indian National Science Academy) in 1935
- Appointed Khaira Professor of Physics, University of Calcutta, in 1935
- Elected President, Physics Section, Indian Science Congress (1942)

== Legacy ==
After C. V. Raman, B.B. Ray was the first Indian physicist to set up a research laboratory which yielded results that could be published in leading journals such as Nature. This undoubtedly provided an impetus to experimental physics in the country. While Ray received recognition in his lifetime, he was almost forgotten in the intervening decades, until a recent revival of interest. Rajinder Singh, who has written a book on Ray, calls him "an unsung hero in Indian science". Singh also argues that Ray's contacts with European scientists were important in themselves, and also facilitated such contacts for other Indian scientists, notably S. N. Bose and M. N. Saha.

The Indian Science News Association continues its activities, including the publication of Science and Culture.
