= Rajdhani College =

Constituent College of University of Delhi

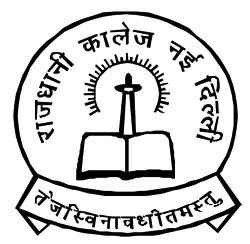
- Seal of Rajdhani College
- Motto: Sanskrit:तेजस्विनावधीतमस्तु English: "Let our efforts at learning be luminous and filled with joy, and endowed with the force of purpose"
- Type: Government College
- Established: 1964; 62 years ago
- Parent institution: University of Delhi
- Principal: Prof. Darshan Pandey
- Location: Mahatma Gandhi Road, Raja Garden, West Delhi district – 110015, Delhi, Republic of India; 28.6548°N 77.1258°E
- Campus: Urban, South campus
- Mascot: lightened Nilavilakku and book; auspicious traditional Indian Lamp representing future, hope, righteousness, path, success and book representing knowledge
- Website: www.rajdhanicollege.ac.in

Rajdhani College is a constituent college of the University of Delhi. It was established in 1964 by the Delhi Administration under the name of Government College. The college acquired its new name when the Delhi Administration vested its governance in an autonomous governing body. Rajdhani College is a south campus college. The college is situated on Mahatma Gandhi Marg (Inner Ring Road), near Rajouri Garden and Raja Garden in west Delhi. Its new building was constructed around 1976–77. The college complex has all facilities such as seminar room, auditorium, library, laboratories, playgrounds for cricket, football, hockey, and volleyball etc. It is a co-educational institution.

== Departments ==
- Chemistry
- Commerce
- Computer Science
- Economics
- English
- Environmental Science
- Hindi
- History
- Linguistics
- Mathematics
- Physical Education
- Physics
- Electronics
- Political Science
- Sanskrit

The Department of Physics and Electronics was divided into the Department of Physics and the Department of Electronics from the academic year 2023-24.

== Courses Offered ==
=== Under Graduation Level ===
- B.Com. (Hons.)
- B.A. (Hons.) English
- B.A. (Hons.) Hindi
- B.A. (Hons.) Sanskrit
- B.A. (Hons.) History
- B.A. (Hons.) Political Science
- B.A. (Hons.) Economics
- BSc (Hons.) Chemistry
- BSc (APS) Industrial Chemistry
- BSc (Hons.) Physics
- BSc (Hons.) Mathematics
- BSc (Hons.) Electronics
- B.A. Program
- BSc Program in Physical Sciences with major in computer science
- BSc Program in Physical Sciences with major in electronics
- BSc Program in Physical Sciences with major in chemistry
- BSc Program in Applied Physical Sciences

=== Post Graduation Level ===
At Post Graduate level, Rajdhani College offers courses in

- English
- Hindi
- History
- Commerce

== Notable people ==
=== Notable alumni ===
- Aakash Chopra, cricketer – Duleep Trophy, Ranji Trophy, Indian National Cricket Team, YouTuber, color analyst and cricket commentator
- Ashish Nehra, cricketer, India National Cricket Team
- Balbir Punj, Member of Parliament
- Devendra Sharma, cricket umpire
- Dibang, anchor at NDTV, STAR News, ABP News
- Mala Ram Gangwal, Member of Legislative Assembly, Delhi
- Sanjay Thapar, first Indian to hoist an Indian flag on North Pole, sky diving coach, national champion

=== Notable faculty ===
- Ram Babu Gupta, (cricket umpire – International)
- Rama Kant Shukla, Sanskrit poet
- Rajinder Nath, theatre director
- Dilip Basu, Prominent theatre artist and activist, Co-founder of natyakal, a bengali theatre group

== Accessibility ==
=== Metro Stations ===
- ESI - Basaidarapur metro station on Pink Line (Delhi Metro)
- Rajouri Garden metro station and Ramesh Nagar metro station on Blue Line (Delhi Metro)

=== Bus Stops ===
- Rajdhani College (on ring road)
- Raja Garden (on ring road)
- Raja garden (on Najafgarh road)
- ESI hospital Basaidarapur (on ring road)
- Rajouri Garden market (on ring road)

=== Railways ===
- Delhi Cantonment railway station (Delhi Cantt railway station)
- Shakur Basti railway station
- New Delhi railway station
- Hazrat Nizamuddin railway station
- Delhi Junction railway station (Old Delhi railway station)
- Anand Vihar Terminal railway station

=== Air ===
- Indira Gandhi International Airport

== See also ==
- Education in Delhi
- List of colleges under Delhi University
- List of alumni of the University of Delhi
- Educational Institutions in Delhi
- Delhi University Community Radio
- DUSU
