= Reenee Singh =

- Born: 1967 (age 58–59); India
- Education: Delhi University (BA, 1987; MA, 1990); Tavistock and Portman NHS Trust
- Occupations: Family and Couples Systemic Psychotherapist
- Children: 2
- Website: reeneesingh.com

Reenee Singh (born 1967) is a psychotherapist, author, and a former editor of the Journal of Family Therapy.

She was the first CEO of the Association of Family Therapy and Systemic Practice (AFT), which is the membership organisation for family and systemic psychotherapists in the UK.

== Education and career ==
Reenee Singh was born in India and earned her Bachelor of Arts (Honours) and Master of Arts in psychology from Delhi University in 1987 and 1990.

She began her family therapy training at the Counselling and Care Centre in Singapore, in collaboration with the Institute of Family Therapy, London, between 1993 and 1994. In 1999, she moved to the United Kingdom to continue her family therapy studies, obtaining a Master of Science in 2001 and a Doctorate in 2008 in Systemic Psychotherapy from The Tavistock and Portman NHS Foundation Trust, in conjunction with the University of East London.

Singh worked at The Tavistock and Portman NHS Foundation Trust from 2002 until 2013. In 2013, she joined The Child and Family Practice, a multidisciplinary, independent clinic in London, and in 2016, she co-founded the London Intercultural Couple Centre at The Child and Family Practice. From 2020 to 2023, Singh served as a director of The Child and Family Practice in the UK.

In 2019, she was appointed the first CEO of the Association of Family Therapy and Systemic Practice (AFT) in the UK, and held this post until 2020.

Singh works as a Family and Couples Systemic Psychotherapist at The Child and Family Practice as well as, more specifically, with intercultural couples and their families.

In 2022, Singh received an award at the first British Sikh Awards in the category Outstanding Achievement of the Year.

== Editor ==
Singh became an associate editor for the Journal of Family Therapy in 2009. In 2014, Singh was appointed as editor and held that position until 2018. From 2018 to 2020, Singh was an associate editor of the Handbook of Systemic Family Therapy.

== Psychotherapeutic approach and theoretical positions ==
Singh follows the family and systemic psychotherapy approach. She works primarily with couples and families, especially with an intercultural background.

According to The Guardian, Singh sees her work as helping intercultural, mixed race and migrant couples. These couples may encounter specific challenges, particularly during transitional phases such as marriage or having children. Couples from different cultural, ethnic, and religious backgrounds may face prejudice from their families and communities, difficulties with language and communication, and questions about the meaning of home.

Singh and Reibstein have developed the Intercultural Exeter Model (2021) for their clinical practice and teaching. Further, Singh draws on Valeria Ugazio's 2013 work on semantic polarities and has found that the semantics of freedom and belonging are predominant amongst intercultural couples.

== Memberships ==
Singh served on the Board of the Association for Family Therapy and Systemic Practice (AFT) from 2017 to 2020. She is a member of the Advisory Council for the Journal of Marital and Family Therapy (JMFT), and is an associate of the educational organisation The Taos Institute.

== Selected publications ==
- Singh, Reenee. (2009). Constructing the family across culture. Journal of Family Therapy. Vol. 31 (4), pp. 359–383.
- Singh, Reenee (2013). The Process of Family Talk Across Culture: A Qualitative Research Study. Saarbrücken: LAP Lambert Academic Publishing. ISBN 978-3-659-32887-9.
- Wallis, Jennifer; Singh, Reenee (2014). Constructions and enactments of whiteness: A discursive analysis. Journal of Family Therapy. Vol. 36.
- Stratton, P.; Lask, J.; Bland, J.; Nowotny, E.; Evans, C.; Singh, Reenee; Janes, E.; Peppiatt, A. (2014). Detecting therapeutic improvement early in therapy: validation of the SCORE-15 index of family functioning and change. Journal of Family Therapy Vol. 36 (1), pp. 3–19.
- Gabb, Jacqui; Singh, Reenee (2014). Reflections on the challenges of understanding racial, cultural and sexual differences in couple relationship research. Journal of Family Therapy. Vol. 37.
- Gabb, Jacqui; Singh, Reenee (2014). The Uses of Emotion Maps in Research and Clinical Practice with Families and Couples: Methodological Innovation and Critical Inquiry. Family Process. Vol. 54.
- Singh, Reenee; Dutta, Sumita (2018). Race and Culture. Routledge. ISBN 978-0-429-91837-7.
- Reibstein, Janet; Singh, Reenee (2020). The Intercultural Exeter Model: Making connections for a divided world through systemic-behavioral therapy. Wiley-Blackwell. ISBN 978-1-119-58057-7.
- Singh, Reenee (2020). Home Is Where the Heart Is: Aporias of Love and Belonging in Intercultural Couples. Abela, Angela; Vella, Sue; Piscopo, Suzanne (eds.): Couple Relationships in a Global Context. Cham: Springer International Publishing, pp. 145–157, doi:10.1007/978-3-030-37712-0_9. ISBN 978-3-030-37711-3.
- Wampler, Karen S.; Miller, Richard B.; Seedall, Ryan B.; McWey, Lenore M.; Blow, Adrian J.; Rastogi, Mudita; Singh, Reenee (2020). The Handbook of Systemic Family Therapy. Volume 4. NJ: Wiley-Blackwell. ISBN 978-1-119-43855-7.
- Ugazio, Valeria; Singh, Reenee; Guarnieri, Stella (2021). The 'Arab Spring' within an intercultural couple. Does the unmentioned 'racial difference' matter? Journal of Family Therapy, Vol. 44, pp. 56–75.
- Singh, Reenee (2024). Therapy with intercultural and interfaith couples. Synder, Douglas K.; Lebow, Jay (eds.): What happens in Couple Therapy: A Casebook on Effective Practice. New York and London: The Guilford Press, pp. 176–196. ISBN 978-1-462-55474-4.
