= Tulsi Agarwal =

Indian politician

Personal details
- Born: 16 June 1959 (age 66) Odisha, India
- Party: BJP
- Spouse: Dr. Deepika Agrawal

Tulsi Agarwal (born 16 June 1959, in Kesinga, Kalahandi district, Odisha) is an Indian politician and a national executive member of the Bharatiya Janata Party (BJP).

== Political career ==
Agarwal was instrumental in the formation of Biju Janta Dal (BJD) in Odisha and its alliance with the BJP. In 2010 he formed an alliance in Jharkhand under the leadership of Shri Arjun Munda. He has had close relations with the top brass of BJP such as the former PM Atal Bihari Vajpaye, Lal Krishna Advani, late Shri Promod Mahajan, Arun Jaitley and others. He is involved in IT/ITES infrastructure development in NCR and was the director of the nationalized Dena bank. Agarwal has been the vice president of the Roller Skating Federation of India since 1990, and because of his efforts, roller skating has received recognition from India's ministry of sports.

== Personal life ==
Tulsi Agrawal is married to Dr. Deepika Agrawal, an associate professor at the University of Delhi. He has a son and 2 daughters.
