= Ramesh Chandra Majumdar (physicist) =

Indian physicist

- Born: 1 March 1904; Patgram, Dacca district, Bengal Presidency
- Died: 29 December 1995 (aged 91); Calcutta
- Education: Calcutta University, University of Jena
- Scientific career
- Fields: Physics
- Workplaces: Bose Institute, Delhi University
- Doctoral students: Asoke Nath Mitra

Ramesh Chandra Majumdar (1904-1995) was an Indian physicist who made contributions in several branches of theoretical physics, notably statistical mechanics and ionospheric physics. He played a key role in setting up the Department of Physics and Astrophysics at the University of Delhi, which he headed for around nine years, and also was pro-vice-chancellor of the university. He was elected a Fellow of the Indian National Science Academy and was general secretary of the National Academy of Sciences, India.

== Early life ==
Majumdar was born on 1 March 1904 in Patgram, a village in Dacca district of the Bengal Presidency, now in Bangladesh. His father, Mahesh Chandra Majumdar worked in a tea estate in Jalpaiguri district of West Bengal. He had his schooling in Jalpaiguri. After completing his undergraduate studies at Rajshahi College, he went to Calcutta to study for his master's degree in physics.

Majumdar studied physics at Calcutta University in the laboratory of B. B. Ray, where he carried out an experiment that demonstrated the Raman effect in X-rays; this was published in Nature in 1931. After completing his Master's in 1927, he moved to Allahabad University, where he wrote a research paper with Meghnad Saha. For the rest of his career, he concentrated on theoretical physics. With Saha's encouragement, he went abroad for his doctoral studies and obtained his Ph.D. from the University of Jena. During this period, he was a frequent visitor to Cambridge University, where his friend and collaborator Daulat Singh Kothari was working for his Ph.D. According to one source, Majumdar went to Cambridge, "arriving — it is said — on the doorstep of Lord Rutherford's home on a Sunday afternoon".

== Career ==
After his return to India, Majumdar taught for a short period at Panjab University in Lahore. He then worked at the Bose Institute in Calcutta, before joining the Physics Department (later renamed Department of Physics and Astrophysics) of the University of Delhi in 1944. Along with Daulat Singh Kothari, who was then head of the department, he played an important role in building up the department by hiring key people to start new research groups. He headed the department from 1948 to 1951. In 1961, when Kothari was appointed chairman of the University Grants Commission (UGC), Majumdar again took over as head of the department, and held the position until his appointment as pro-vice-chancellor in 1967. During his tenure as head, the department was recognised as a Centre of Advanced Studies by the UGC. Majumdar held the post of pro-vice-chancellor of the university from 1967 to 1969. Upon his retirement, he was appointed professor emeritus for life.

Both as head and as pro-vice chancellor, Majumdar was responsible for new facilities being set up in the department. He held a visiting assignment at the Tata Institute of Fundamental Research in 1948. According to Piara Singh Gill, who held Majumdar in high regard as representing "the best traditions of scholarship", the Tata Institute authorities wanted Majumdar to stay on in Bombay, but he chose to return to Delhi. Majumdar was also a founding member of the Delhi University Teachers' Association.

== Honours and awards ==
- Premchand Roychand Scholarship Research Student, University of Calcutta
- Fellow, Indian National Science Academy (elected 1941)
- General secretary, The National Academy of Sciences, India (1953, 1954)
- Pro-vice-chancellor, University of Delhi
- Professor Emeritus, University of Delhi

== Books authored/edited by Ramesh Chandra Majumdar ==
- Bosons: Presented to Satyendra Nath Bose on the Occasion of His Seventieth Birthday, edited by R. C. Majumdar, Hindustan Publishing, 1964

== Legacy ==
Majumdar's role as an institution-builder is important in the context of physics in India. As mentioned above, he played a major role in building up the Department of Physics and Astrophysics, both by hiring faculty to build up specific research areas and by setting up research facilities. He was also an influential teacher. Many students who attended his classes were inspired to take up research careers. Overall, Majumdar, through his life and work, reinforced the idea that it was possible to do high-quality physics research in a university, as evidenced by his turning down the TIFR offer.

Majumdar also started a tradition of organising summer schools on topics of current interest. These were typically directed at Ph.D. students, and held at various hill stations in Northern India.
