= Dibang =

Indian journalist

- Born: Arunachal Pradesh, India
- Citizenship: Indian
- Education: Graduated from Rajdhani College, Delhi University
- Occupations: Journalist, News Anchor

Dibang is an Indian journalist, senior news anchor and former host of daily prime-time show 'Jan Man' and weekly show 'Press Conference' on the Hindi news channel ABP News. A member of debate panels of the channel, he is rated among the best Hindi anchors in the industry today.

== Career ==
He is the current anchor of ABP News and was the managing director of NDTV INDIA, a 24-hour Hindi news channel. As the Executive Editor, he was the launching face for NDTV India. Before joining NDTV, he worked for Aaj Tak, a 24-hour Hindi news channel. When Aaj Tak became a 24-hour channel, Dibang was the launching face.

Before joining television news, Dibang was a correspondent with The Sunday Times of India in New Delhi. He started his career in journalism with The Illustrated Weekly of India.

He anchored the first-ever hour-long Hindi debate show on television, Muqabla on NDTV India. At the Indian Television Academy Awards 2006, Muqabla won the Best Talk Show Award. This was the first time a Hindi chat show had won such an award in a category consisting mostly of English shows.

Dibang has won many awards for his anchoring and documentaries. He also acted in an Italian film directed by Italo Spinelli. He has worked for several foreign television networks, including SBS and ABC of Australia, NHK of Japan and RAI

Dibang recently acted in the Hindi film Madras Cafe, in which he played an ex-RAW agent.

A graduate from University of Delhi, Dibang grew up in Arunachal Pradesh in north-east India.

== Filmography ==
- 2013 Madras Cafe - Ex-RAW Agent
- 2016 Pink- Dilip Sharma
- 2017 Half Girlfriend- Manoj
- 2019 Dream Girl- Sanjay Singh
