= Sri Aurobindo College =

College of the University of Delhi

- Motto in English: Lead me from Darkness to Light
- Type: Government College
- Established: 1972
- Affiliations: University of Delhi
- Chairperson: Mr. Sanjay Mishra
- Principal: Arun Chaudhary
- Academic staff: 132
- Undergraduates: 3200
- Location: Delhi, South Delhi, India; 28.533120°N 77.204236°E
- Campus: Urban
- Language: English
- Nickname: SACIANS
- Website: www.aurobindo.du.ac.in

Sri Aurobindo College is a constituent college of the University of Delhi in India. It was established in 1972, the birth centenary of the philosopher and poet, Sri Aurobindo. The college is situated in South Delhi in Malviya Nagar, in the vicinity of Qutab Minar, Sri Aurobindo Ashram, IIT (Delhi), NCERT and Qutab Institutional Area.
