= Surendra Sheodas Barlingay =

Indian logician and writer (1919–1997)

Surendra Shivdas Barlingay (20 July 1919 – 19 December 1997) Nagpur, India) was an Indian logician and Marathi writer. He earned his PhD in philosophy at Nagpur University, taught at University of Pune and Zagreb University, and was chair of the philosophy department at Delhi University. Barlingay was chair of the State Board of Literature and Culture for the government of the Indian state of Maharashtra from 1980 to 1988. Barlingay was incarcerated during India's independence movement. Barlingay introduced the concept of geni-analysis in philosophy.

== Education ==
S.S.Barlingay was a fellow at the Indian Institute of Philosophy, Amalner (1942–43). He did his post-doctoral research at Oxford University (1958–59).

== Career ==
Barlingay was a scholar and teacher of philosophy.

Barlingay participated in the Indian Freedom Movements of 1932 and 1942. Barlingay had also participated in the Hyderabad Struggle of 1947–48. Barlingay was secretary of All India Student Conference 1940 and the general secretary of C.P. and Berar Students' Federation 1940–41. Barlingay was one of the founders and a joint secretary of All India Student Congress and of Rashtriya Yuvak Sangh. Barlingay also participated in the Kisan and Labour movements.

As a founder of several colleges and educational institutions, Barlingay contributed to the spread of education in Marathwada and the Telangana. Barlingay was the founding Principal of People's College, Nanded (1950–56), College of Arts and Science, Siddipeth, Medak (1956–57) and principal of S. R. R. College of Karimnagar (1957–59). Barlingay was also the founding secretary and sometime vice-president of the Nutan Vidya Samiti and New Science College, Hyderabad.

As a teacher of philosophy, Barlingay was associated with S. V. University, Tirupati, University of Delhi and University of Poona in India and Universities of Zagreb (Yugoslavia) and Western Australia. Barlingay was the first Indian Professor of Philosophy and Culture at Zagreb (Yugoslavia). Barlingay also lectured at the Universities of Oslo, Manchester, Belgrade and Udain.

Barlingay represented India at various international conferences and seminars, including the Seminar on 'Man to-day' at Dubrovnik (Yugoslavia) and Australasian Philosophy at Weimar. Barlingay attended the UNESCO Experts Meeting at (Senegal) as a delegate.

The philosophy community of India recognised Barlingay's contributions by electing him General President of the Darshan Parishad, Ranchi (1975), Indian Philosophical Congress, Madras 1979. Barlingay was the President of Indian Academy of Philosophy, Calcutta. Barlingay was a U. G. C. National Lecturer (1974) and a fellow of the Indian Institute of Advanced Studies, Simla (1976–77).

Barlingay was the founding editor of Deshbandhu (a daily) and Inquilab (a weekly) of Nagpur. He has revived the former "Philosophical Quarterly" of Amalner as the "Indian Philosophical Quarterly" and started two Philosophical Journals, Paramarsha (Marathi) and Paramarsha (Hindi) in University of Pune.

As head of the department of philosophy in Pune he:

- Started three journals of philosophy in English, Marathi and Hindi, respectively
- Appointed a Nyaya pandit to teach Nyaya and other philosophies
- Revise the philosophy syllabus
- Organized seminars for dialogue among pandits and philosophers trained in the western way
- Introduced symbolic and philosophical logic in the curriculum
- Established chairs in Jain philosophy and philosophy of science
- Organized summer institutes
- Introduced "open" courses to encourage free thinking, where teachers were allowed to present their thoughts in the form of a course that was treated on par with other coursed listed in the syllabus

== Contribution to philosophy ==
Indian Ethics

He has taken up an enterprise to 're understand' the Indian Philosophy. He wrote a book titled "A Modern Introduction to Indian Ethics". He discusses the development of ethics in Indian in the primitive time. He has anthropologically reviewed the period before Vedas till the beginning of upanishadic period. This is the most untouched area as far as the ethics in India is concerned. He says that the norms of dominant culture were imposed as ethical norms in the beginning.

Barlingay focused on three aspects of philosophy.

- Philosophy is an apex intellectual exercise which takes place in different places and time periods, irrespective of the geographical limit, race-limit, etc.
- Philosophy is an action and is not speculative.
- Philosophy is the analysis of ordinary language and concepts.

His general conception of philosophy had bearing on his conception of Indian philosophy as well. He highlighted misconceptions about Indian philosophy.

- "Indian philosophy is not really philosophy." He claimed that it is really just philosophy propounded by Indian philosophers, unlike the claims of Indologists and Orientalists.
- "Indian philosophy is a kind of 'System'." He claimed that Indian philosophy instead offers ways of knowing and that regarding philosophy as system building is an offshoot of Hegel.

=== Geni-analysis ===
Geni-analysis is simultaneously a phenomenological and a metaphysical regulative principle. Phenomenologically Barlingay describes the structures of awareness, particularly its self-reflective and self-conscious forms. In this structural analysis, Barlingay is concerned with the stages of its development. For Barlingay, structure is not divorced from genesis, so structured analysis is an account of how structures are formed. This method of elucidation Barlingay calls "geni-analysis".

A philosopher has to understand this basic structure and offer a critique of it. For Barlingay it is more important than the philosophical systems that become rigid over time. Barlingay explains further, "Just as we require imagination for inventing something, similarly for discovering the basic structure and then to have a critique of these structures also we require imagination. Although a philosopher has to be critical, he should not ignore this imagination part, for it is imagination which makes him think. The critical part, of course, makes him discriminate what is to be accepted from imagination and what is to be rejected. It is, again, the imagination which gives us insight and also the flashes. The insights and flashes may throw more light on reality than the rigid systematization."

Geni-analysis is a portmanteau of "genesis" and "analysis". The term genesis refers to origin or root. By this he probably means historical root. Generally analysis of a concept is done without considering its historical origin. Geni-analysis tries to go to the genesis of the concept while analysing it. Here he is making use of the two tools of imagination and critical method.

By imagination, Barlingay discovers the basic structure which gave rise to a particular concept and by critique he scrutinises his discovery for correctness. "Systematization makes philosophy dead; insights keep it alive and make us dive in search of truth. I have, therefore, never attempted to systematize my thinking is just a case of wild imagination. But whether My thinking is correct or not, the procedure I have talked about is, I think, correct. This, according to me, is my method of analysis. It is neither conceptual, nor linguistic analysis in the strict sense of the term, although I do not discard the linguistic or conceptual analysis. I call my method of analysis 'geni-analysis' because in my opinion thinking is spread in time and the element of time or history cannot be completely discarded or ignored in philosophizing."

== Legacy ==
In Barlingay's honour the Indian Council of Philosophical Research organised a three-day programme called "Meet the Philosopher: Surendra S. Barlingay" in March 1993 at the University of Delhi. The volume "Confessions and Commitments" was the outcome of the "Meet the Philosophy" event. Upon Barlingay reaching sixty years of age on 20 July 1979, a congratulatory volume '"Philosophy: Theory and Action" was prepared. To mark Barlingay's role as a freedom fighter, he was interviewed by the Nehru Memorial Museum and Library in 1993 as part of its Oral history Project. This material was later used in the TV serial 'Discovery of India'. The department of Philosophy, University of Pune expressed publishing three of his volumes, one in Marathi and two in Hindi.

== Works ==
- Mee Pan Majhee (1982)
- Saundaryache Vyakarana (1956)
- Maze Ghar Masa Desh (1985)
- Inquilab (1985)
- A Modern Introduction to Indian Logic(1965)
- A Modern Introduction to Indian Aesthetic Theory(2007)
