= S. C. Jain =

Indian physicist

- Born: 5 December 1926; Saharanpur, Uttar Pradesh, India
- Died: 10 December 2009 (aged 83); India
- Education: Delhi University; National Physical Laboratory
- Known for: Studies on Solid state physics
- Awards: 1966 Shanti Swarup Bhatnagar Prize
- Scientific career
- Fields: Solid state physics; Semiconductor devices
- Workplaces: National Physical Laboratory; IIT Delhi; DRDO; University of Illinois; Atomic Energy Research Establishment; Imperial College of London
- Doctoral advisor: K. S. Krishnan

Suresh Chand Jain (5 December 1926 – 10 December 2009) was an Indian physicist and director of the Defence Research and Development Organization. Known for his research in solid state physics, Jain was an elected fellow of the Indian National Science Academy and National Academy of Sciences, India. In 1966, the Council of Scientific and Industrial Research, the apex agency of the Government of India for scientific research, awarded him the Shanti Swarup Bhatnagar Prize for Science and Technology, one of the highest Indian science awards for his contributions to physical sciences. (Note: Long link – please select award year to see details)

== Biography ==
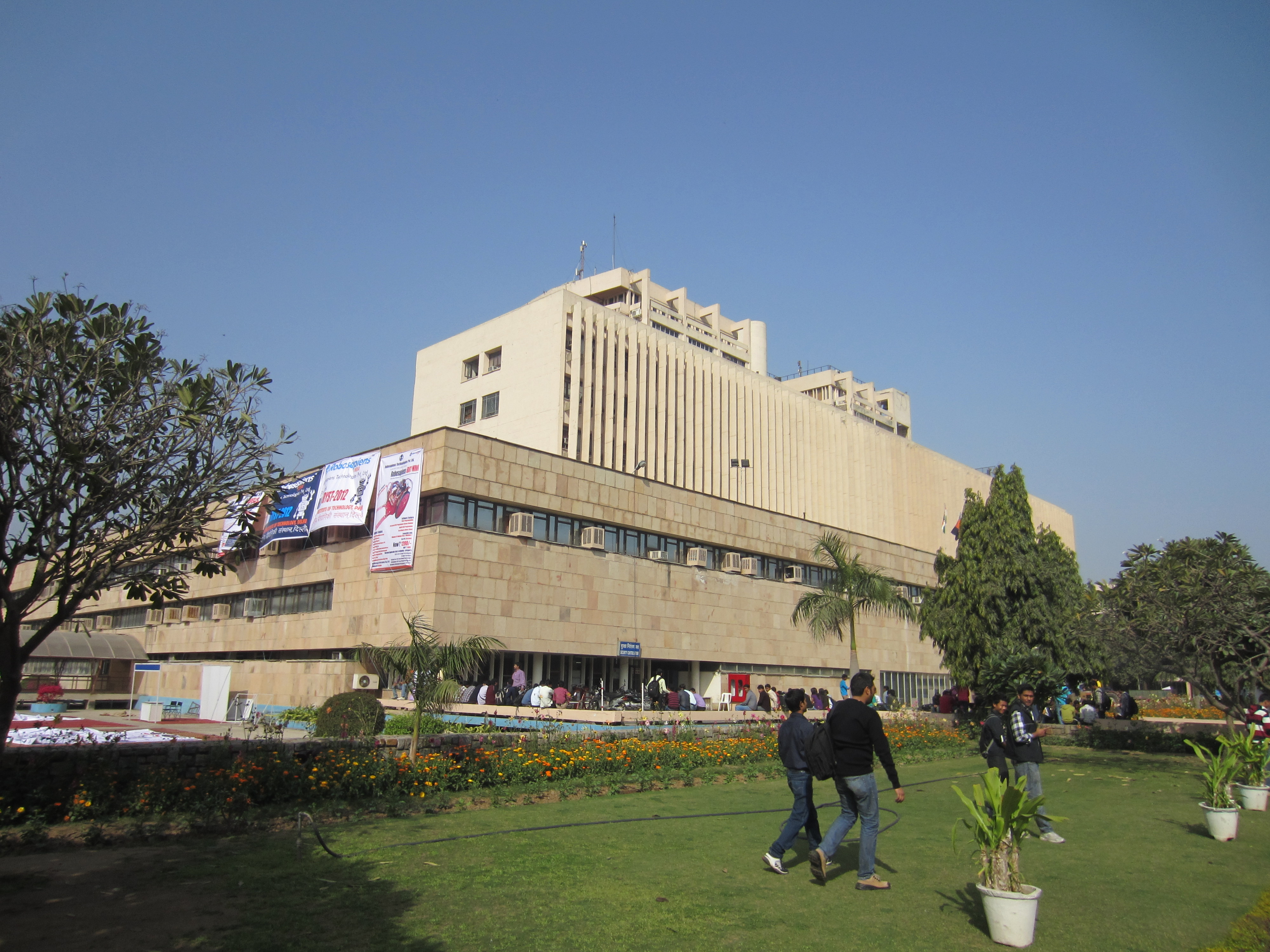
IIT Delhi

S. C. Jain, born on 5 December 1926 in Saharanpur in the Indian state of Uttar Pradesh, earned an MSc degree in physics in 1949 and followed it up with a PhD in solid state physics from Delhi University in 1955, carrying out his research at the National Physical Laboratory, Delhi under Kariamanickam Srinivasa Krishnan. Subsequently, he moved to the UK to take up the position of a faculty member at University of Leeds and worked there until 1958. (Note: Long link – please click J and select SC Jain to see details) On his return to India, he joined the Indian Institute of Technology, Delhi where he served as the head of the department of physics from 1965 to 1968 and as the dean of faculty of science from 1966 to 1969. Concurrently, he worked at his alma mater, the National Physical Laboratory, and held the position of a deputy director during 1965–69, and as the director of Solid State Physics Laboratory (SSPL) during the period 1969–74. While heading the SSPL, he also held the directorship of the Defence Research and Development Organization (DRDO). In between, he did visiting professor assignments at University of Illinois, Atomic Energy Research Establishment and Imperial College of London (1975–77).

Jain died on 10 December 2009, at the age of 83.

== Legacy ==
During his doctoral studies, Jain assisted his mentor, K. S. Krishnan, the co-discoverer of the Raman Effect, on the thermal conductivity of solids. It was during this time, the duo developed a methodology for the measurement of thermal conductivity in solids at high temperatures which was published by them in an article, Thermionic Constants of Metals and Semiconductors. II. Metals of the First Transition Group in 1952 in Proceedings of the Royal Society of London. Series A, Mathematical and Physical Sciences and later explained further by way of another article, Determination of thermal conductivities at high temperatures in British Journal of Applied Physics in 1954. The measurement protocol later came to be known as the "Jain-Krishnan Method". Polar crystals, thin films and semiconductor devices are some of the other areas he worked on, and he was credited with developing experimental techniques in these disciplines which are in use around the world. He also contributed to the development of electronic equipment for the military. His studies have been documented by way of a number of articles (Note: Please see Selected bibliography section) and he published four books viz. Recent advances in semiconductors: theory and technology, Nonmetallic crystals, Germanium-silicon strained layers and heterostructures, and Electronic absorption and internal and external vibrational data of atomic and molecular ions doped in alkali halide crystals.

Jain was the director of the International Advanced School on Theory and Technology of Semiconductors, an Indian Institute of Technology Delhi (IIT Delhi) program held in April 1968. He chaired the international conference on science and technology of non-metallic crystals held at IIT Delhi in January 1969 and was associated with International Union of Pure and Applied Physics as a member of its solid state commission. He was also a member of the editorial boards of journals such as Radiation Effects and Defects in Solids, Crystal Lattice Defects and Amorphous Materials and Journal of Nonmetals and was a senior member of the Institute of Electrical and Electronics Engineers.

== Awards and honors ==
The Council of Scientific and Industrial Research awarded Jain the Shanti Swarup Bhatnagar Prize, one of the highest Indian science awards in 1966 and the Indian National Science Academy elected him as a fellow in 1979. He was also a fellow of the National Academy of Sciences, India, Physical Society of London, American Physical Society, Faraday Society and Institution of Electronics and Telecommunication Engineers.

== Selected bibliography ==
=== Books ===
- S. C. Jain (1971). Recent advances in semiconductors: theory and technology: proceedings of the International Advanced School on Theory and Technology of Semiconductors, held during April 6 – May 5, 1968 at Indian Institute of Technology, New Delhi. Hindustan Pub. Corp. (India). p. 255. OCLC 633996854.
- S. C. Jain, L T Chadderton (1970). Nonmetallic crystals : proceedings of the international conference on the science and technology of nonmetallic crystals, New Delhi. Gordon and Breach Science Publ. p. 335. ISBN 9780677142104. OCLC 964077912.
- S. C. Jain (1994). Germanium-silicon strained layers and heterostructures. Academic Press. p. 302. ISBN 9780120145980.
- S. C. Jain; A V R Warrier, S K Agarwal (1974). Electronic absorption and internal and external vibrational data of atomic and molecular ions doped in alkali halide crystals. National Bureau of Standards. p. 51. OCLC 351740405.

=== Articles ===
- K S Krishnan, S C Jain (1954). "Determination of thermal conductivities at high temperatures". British Journal of Applied Physics. 5 (1): 426–430. Bibcode:1954BJAP....5..426K. doi:10.1088/0508-3443/5/12/302.
- K S Krishnan, S C Jain (1956). "Thermionic Constants of Semi-Conductors". Nature. 177 (4502): 285. Bibcode:1956Natur.177..285K. doi:10.1038/177285a0. S2CID 4214793.
- S C Jain, T C Goel, V Narayan (1968). "Thermal conductivity of metals at high temperatures by the Jain and Krishnan method III. Platinum". Journal of Physics D: Applied Physics. 2 (109): 109–113. doi:10.1088/0022-3727/2/1/316. S2CID 250776770.
- S C Jain, T C Goel (1968). "Thermal conductivity of metals at high temperatures by the Jain and Krishnan method I. Nickel". Journal of Physics D: Applied Physics. 1 (573): 573–580. Bibcode:1968JPhD....1..573J. doi:10.1088/0022-3727/1/5/305. S2CID 250782724.
- S. C. Jain, Vijaya Sinha, B. K. Reddy (1969). "Thermal conductivity of metals at high temperatures by the Jain and Krishnan Method IV. Palladium". Journal of Physics D: Applied Physics. 2 (9): 1283–1289. Bibcode:1969JPhD....2.1283J. doi:10.1088/0022-3727/2/9/310. S2CID 250797263.
- S C Jain, V Narayan, T C Goel (1969). "Thermal conductivity of metals at high temperatures by the Jain and Krishnan method II. Cobalt". Journal of Physics D: Applied Physics. 2 (101): 101–107. Bibcode:1969JPhD....2..101J. doi:10.1088/0022-3727/2/1/315. S2CID 250767710.
- S C Jain1 V Sinha, B K Reddy (1970). "Thermal conductivity of metals at high temperatures by the Jain and Krishnan method: V. Zirconium". Journal of Physics D: Applied Physics. 3 (1359): 1359–1362. Bibcode:1970JPhD....3.1359J. doi:10.1088/0022-3727/3/9/317. S2CID 250763764.
- S C Jain1, B B Sharma, B K Reddy (1972). "Thermal conductivity of metals at high temperatures by the Jain and Krishnan method VI. Rhodium". Journal of Physics D: Applied Physics. 5 (155): 155–159. Bibcode:1972JPhD....5..155J. doi:10.1088/0022-3727/5/1/320. S2CID 250893756.

== See also ==
- Nonmetal
- Thermionic emission
