= Rama Kant Shukla =

Poet, Academician and Padma Awardee

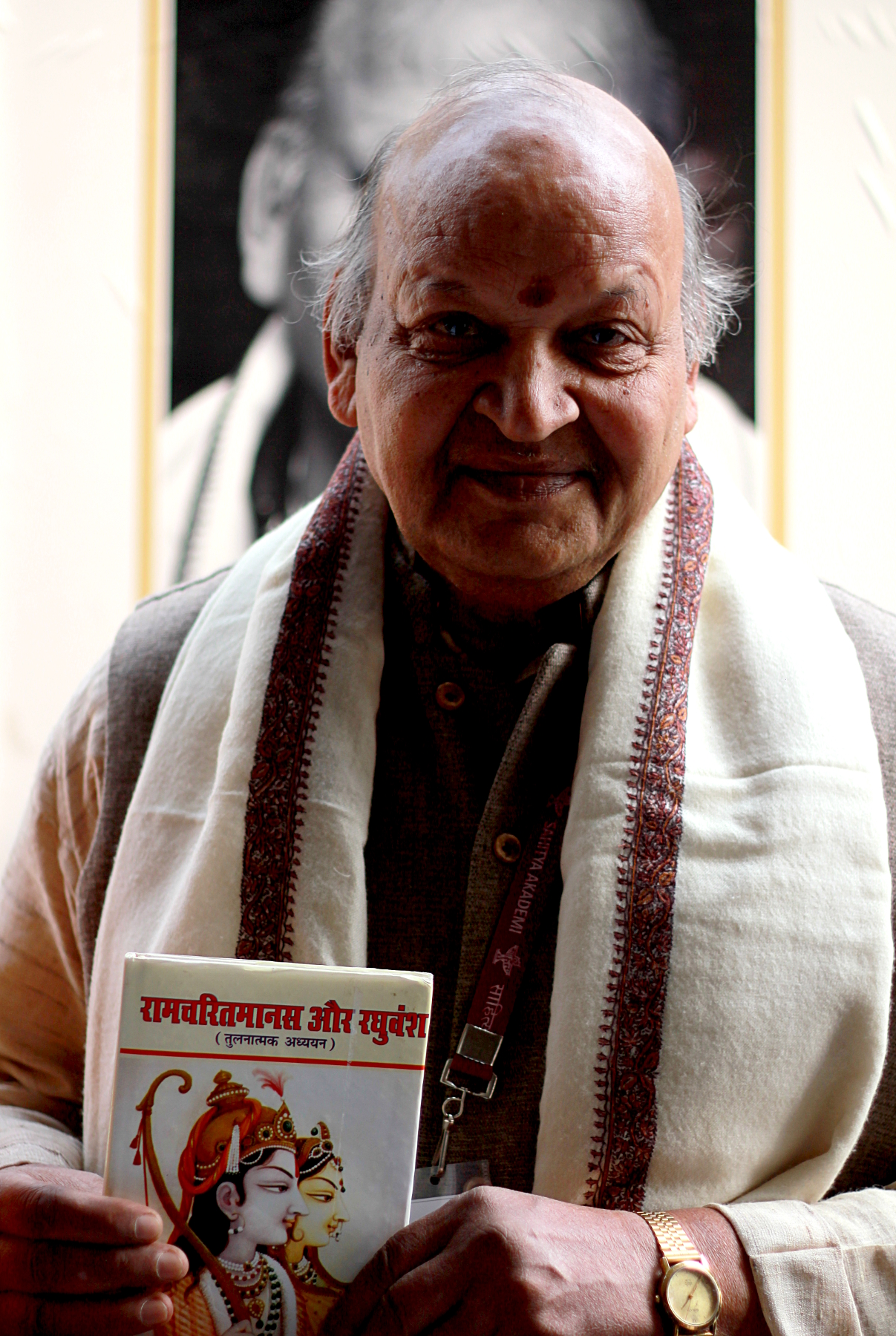
- Rama Kant Shukla at Festival of Letters Delhi 2019
- Born: 24 December 1940; Khurja, Uttar Pradesh, India
- Died: 11 May 2022 (aged 81)
- Occupations: Sanskrit scholar and writer Reader at Rajdhani College, Delhi University (Retired 2005)
- Parent(s): Shri Brahmanand Shukla; Smt. Priyamvada Shukla
- Awards: • Padma Shri • Sahitya Akademi Award in Sanskrit • UP State Award • Sanskrit Rashtrakavi • Kaviratna • Kavi Siromani • Hindu Sanskrit Setu • Kalidas Samman • Sanskrit Sahitya Seva Samman • Sanskrit Rashtrakavi • Akhil Bharatiya Maulika Sanskrit Rachana Puraskara • President's Award

Rama Kant Shukla (25 December 1940 – 11 May 2022) was an Indian scholar of Sanskrit and Hindi languages. The Government of India honoured him, in 2013, by awarding him the Padma Shri, the fourth highest civilian award, for his contributions to the fields of literature.

== Biography ==
Rama Kant Shukla was born on 25 December 1940, at Khurja city in the Indian state of Uttar Pradesh. His initial studies were in the traditional way as he learnt Sanskrit from his parents, Sahityacharya PANDIT Brahmanand Shukla and Smt. Priyamvada SHUKLA, and attained Sahitya Acharya and Sankhya Yoga Acharya degrees. Later, he joined Agra University and did MA in Hindi with a gold medal and subsequently did MA in Sanskrit from the Sampurnananda Sanskrit University. He also secured a Ph.D. in the year 1967. The topic of his Ph.D. was 'Jainacharya Ravishena- krita Padmapurana (Sanskrit) evam Tulasidas krita Ramacharitmanas ka tulanatmak adhayayan.

Shukla started his career by joining the Multanimal Modi PG College in Modi Nagar in 1962 as a Hindi lecturer. After obtaining his PhD, he joined Rajdhani College, Delhi University, New Delhi as a Hindi faculty member on 1 August 1967. In 1986, he was appointed as the Reader of the Hindi Department and worked there till his retirement, in 2005. He has participated in many seminars and conferences including the World Sanskrit Conference. He has held the chair of All India Oriental Conferences on Indian aesthetics and poetry and Sanskrit literature and is the founder Chief Editor of the Arvacheena-Sanskritam, a quarterly journal published by Devavani Parishad, Delhi, an organization he has founded. He has also participated in the All India Radio Sarvabhasha Kavi Sammelan representing Sanskrit language.

He died on 11 May 2022 while travelling to the state of Jharkhand from Delhi by train, near Hari Nagar (Aligarh) in India.

== Books ==
Shukla has authored several books in Sanskrit and Hindi, He has also written and directed a Sanskrit television series, Bhati Me Bharatam, telecast by Doordarshan.

- Dr. Rama Kant Shukla (1993). Devavani-suvasah - Dr. Rama Kant Shukla felicitation volume. Devavani-Prakasanam. ISBN 978-8190030854.
- Dr. Rama Kant Shukla (1979). Arvācīnasaṃskr̥tam. New Delhi: Devavāṇī-Pariṣad. LCCN 81910313.
- Dr. Rama Kant Shukla (1980). Bhāti me Bhāratam. New Delhi: Devavāṇī-Pariṣad. LCCN 83906451.
- Dr. Rama Kant Shukla (2000). Sārasvata-saṅgama. New Delhi: Jñānabhāratī Pablikeśansa. LCCN 99956208.
- Rama Kant Shukla (2000). Sanskrit poet and scholar Rama Kant Shukla reads from his works. New Delhi: South Asian Literary Recordings Project (Library of Congress). OCLC 47738659.
- Dr. Rama Kant Shukla (2002). "Bharatajnataham". Vedic Books.

Shukla lives in New Delhi attending to his duties as the Shastra Chudamani Vidwan at the Rashtriya Sanskrit Sansthan.

== Awards and recognitions ==
Rama Kant Shukla is a recipient of Sanskrit Rashtrakavi, Kaviratna, Kavi Siromani and Hindi Sanskrit Setu titles by various literary organizations. He has also been awarded the titles such as Kalidas Samman, Sanskrit Sahitya Seva Samman and Sanskrit Rashtrakavi.

The Uttar Pradesh government has honoured Dr. Shukla with the state award while he has also received the Akhil Bharatiya Maulika Sanskrit Rachana Puraskara from the Delhi Sanskrit Academy. The President of India awarded him the Sanskrit Scholar award in 2009 and the Government of India followed it up with the civilian award of Padma Shri, in 2013. He is the founder president of Bhartiya Sanskrit Ptrakar Sangh.

Rama Kant Shukla was awarded the Sahitya Academy Award in Sanskrit for Mama Janani in 2018
