= Journal of Family Therapy =

- Discipline: Family therapy
- Language: English
- Edited by: Philip Messent

Publication details
- History: 1979-present
- Publisher: Wiley-Blackwell on behalf of the Association of Family Therapy and Systematic Practice
- Frequency: Quarterly
- Impact factor: 1.066 (2014)

Standard abbreviations
- ISO 4: J. Fam. Ther.

Indexing
- ISSN: 0163-4445 (print); 1467-8438 (web)
- LCCN: 81642510
- OCLC no.: 609932637

Links
- Journal homepage; Online access; Online archive

The Journal of Family Therapy is a quarterly peer-reviewed academic journal published by Wiley-Blackwell on behalf of the Association of Family Therapy and Systematic Practice.

== Description ==
The journal was established in 1979. It covers research related to family therapy, spanning subfields of psychology such as clinical psychology, therapy, counselling, and psychoanalysis.

According to the Journal Citation Reports, the journal has a 2017 impact factor of 1.066, ranking it 31st out of 46 journals in the category "Family Studies" and 99th out of 127 journals in the category "Psychology Clinical".
