= Neena Mitter =

Australian biotechnologist

Neena Mitter is an agricultural biotechnologist who has worked on RNA-based crop protection.

== Early life and education ==
Mitter was born in Ghaziabad, India. She received a B.Sc. from Delhi University and an M.Sc. and PhD from the Indian Agricultural Research Institute.

She was a post-doctoral fellow in the United Kingdom then worked at the Indian Agricultural Research Institute as a scientist until 2000 when she moved to Australia. She worked as a biotechnologist at the Queensland Department of Primary Industries and Fisheries until 2004 when she became an academic research fellow at the University of Queensland.

== Career and research ==
Mitter led the University of Queensland team that discovered BioClay, a biopesticide technology which was announced in Nature Plants in 2017. BioClay is degradable clay used to stabilise double-stranded RNA (dsRNA) and is sprayed onto plants with regular agricultural spraying equipment. dsRNA is unstable and does not give sustained release when sprayed naked (without the clay) onto plants. In BioClay the dsRNA is loaded onto non-toxic, degradable clay nanosheets. The clay protects the RNA from washing off the plant and enables the RNA to be released to the plant over many days. The formulation of the dsRNA is custom-designed to protect the plant from specific disease-causing pathogens and pests.

Mitter leads the Sustainable Crop Protection Australian Research Council (ARC) Hub, which researches the use of double-strand RNA (dsRNA) and RNA interference (RNAi) technologies to protect crops from diseases and pests. This new process has been dubbed AgRNA – RNA for agriculture. Its benefit, versus traditional controls, is sustainability. It is specific (there is little or no damage to species that are not targeted) and it leaves no harmful residues. For example, in the control of harmful nematodes, three nematode species can be controlled with other nematode species left unharmed.

One example of the use of dsRNA and RNAi is the vadescana (Norroa) preventative treatment (available in the US) against the Varroa mite. Varroa mites have been devastating honey bee populations around the world, including in Australia, with major adverse impacts for producers of crops such as almonds. Mitter has been talking to the Australian Pesticides and Veterinary Medicines Authority (APVMA) and other organisations about what is needed to make this RNA treatment available in Australia.

In 2017 Mitter became the inaugural director of the Queensland Alliance for Agriculture and Food Innovation (QAAFI) Centre for Horticultural Science (CHS), established to meet the growth in demand for vegetables, fruit and nuts. Avocado production has been one focus of Mitter and QAAFI and there has been success at QAAFI with tissue-culture propagation.

In 2023 the science magazine Cosmos named Mitter as one of the 50 women at the cutting edge of Australian science.

In 2024 Mitter joined Charles Sturt University where she is now Deputy Vice Chancellor (Research). She continues to be the Director of the ARC Hub for Sustainable Crop Protection at The University of Queensland.

In 2026 Mitter and colleagues have reported that, as this RNA biopesticide technology shifts from proof-of-concept to practical reality, its adoption now depends on international regulatory harmonization and public trust (social licence).

One major benefit of these biopesticides (a paper published in 2026 and co-authored by Mitter says) is the mobility of the dsRNA inside the plant. Traditional pesticides, and indeed sprayed dsRNA, lose their effect when they hit the soil. Because dsRNA can travel from leaves into the roots it provides a valuable opportunity to target hard-to-reach pests and pathogens.

In September 2026 Mitter delivered a NSW Science and Research Breakfast Seminar titled “RNA for Agriculture: From Discovery to Commercialisation” for the NSW Chief Scientist and Engineer at NSW Parliament House.

== Honours and awards ==
- 1982 Delhi University Gold Medal for First Position
- 1987 Young Scientist Award by the Prime Minister of India
- 2012 Gates Foundation Grand Challenges Explorations Award
- 2017 Women in Technology Life Sciences Outstanding Award
- 2019 Australian Academy of Technology and Engineering Fellowship
- 2022 Indian National Academy of Agricultural Sciences, Pravasi Fellow
