= Nandita Chandra =

Nandita Chandra is an Indian actress and model. She has appeared on stage, television and in films, in her native India and in the United States.

Chandra, who was born in New Delhi, earned an MFA from the Actor's Studio Drama School, then located The New School in New York.

In 2003 she appeared in the play Edible Women at the India Habitat Centre in New Dehli.

She was a company member of the Off-Broadway Irish Repertory Theatre, credited as an understudy for its 2008 production of Around the World in 80 Days. She was last seen in The Homebase Project in David Bar Katz's "Can't Go Home" opposite LAByrinth founding member David Deblinger. She was featured in a Yashraj films production with Bollywood leading man Shahid Kapoor. In 2010 she starred in "The Blowup" by J Wingfield which premiered at The Manhattan Film Festival.

Her TV credits include minor ("pharmacist", "FBI agent") or uncredited appearances in one episode each of White Collar, Taxi Brooklyn, The Leftovers and Falling Water. She had a minor role in the 2019 episode "The Voter", of the series The Politician. As of November 2024, she plays a small role as a doctor in the in-production TV Series Long Bright River that stars Amanda Seyfreid in the lead role.

In 2008, Chandra was officially recognized by Pratibha Singh, Indian Member of Parliament, for her contributions in the field of theatre and performing arts in India.

From 2011 through 2013, Chandra performed Natalie Menna's one-act one-woman show I-Pod, at various theatre festivals in New York. In 2011, her performance won the award for Outstanding Actress in a Short Subject, at The Midtown International Theater Festival, won Best Solo Show at The Network One Act Festival in 2012, and also staged the work at the 2013 Strawberry One Act Festival and the 2013 United Solo Theatre Festival.

== Filmography ==
- Chehere (2003) as Mrs Fernandez
- Red, Black and White (2003) as Yasmin
- Red Earth (2004) Katsaki
- Occasional Twists and Turns (2004) as Shashi
- Going Up (2007)

== TV credits ==
- White Collar (2009)
- The Leftovers (2014)
- I Love You... But I Lied (2015)
- Falling Water (2016)
- The Politician (2019)
- Long Bright River (2024)
