= Asoke Nath Mitra =

Indian theoretical physicist (born 1929)

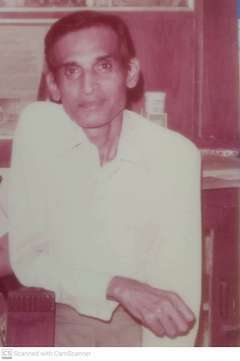
- Asoke Nath Mitra at Delhi University in April 1985 on his 56th Birthday
- Born: April 15, 1929; Rajshahi, Rajshahi Division, Bengal Province, British India (modern-day Bangladesh)
- Died: November 26, 2022 (aged 93); New Delhi, India
- Education: Delhi University (PhD), India, Cornell University (PhD) United States
- Known for: Theoretical Nuclear Physics, Particle Physics, Quantum Field Theory
- Awards: Bhatnagar Award
- Scientific career
- Fields: Theoretical Physics
- Workplaces: Delhi University, India
- Doctoral advisor: R. C. Majumdar, Hans Bethe

Asoke Nath Mitra (15 April 1929 - 26 November 2022) was an Indian theoretical physicist. He was a lifetime professor emeritus at Delhi University. He is known for his work in nuclear physics, particle physics and quantum field theory and in particular, for his fundamental contributions in obtaining the exact solution of the nucleon 3- body problem with separable potentials which led to the few nucleon studies, quark-recoil effect, development of an integrated dynamics of 2- and 3- body systems from nucleons to quarks as well as for the development of quark dynamics and relativistic quark models for hadrons in the Bethe-Salpeter framework. He was awarded the Shanti Swarup Bhatnagar Prize in 1969.

== Early life ==
Asoke Nath Mitra was born on 15 April 1929, in Rajshahi, now in Bangladesh, to Jatindra Nath and Rama Rani Mitra. He married Anjali Mitra (née Ghosh) in November 1956. His father, Jatindra Nath Mitra, taught mathematics in Ramjas College, Delhi University. Mitra too went to Ramjas College to study mathematics, obtaining his bachelor's degree in 1947 and M.A. in 1949. He started his work in physics in 1949, as a Ph.D. student working with R. C. Majumdar.

== Academic career ==
After his Ph.D., Mitra went to Cornell University, where he completed a second Ph.D., working with Freeman Dyson and Hans Bethe. Mitra returned to India in 1955, and was appointed Reader at Aligarh Muslim University. He moved to Delhi University as professor in 1963, where he remained until his superannuation in 1994. Mitra was head of the Department of Physics and Astrophysics during 1973–75, but stepped down without completing his three-year term. He held visiting appointments at Indiana University (1962–63) and at the University of Illinois at Chicago (1986–87). He held the prestigious chair of INSA: INSA-Albert Einstein Research Professor during 1989–94 at the University of Delhi. He was a life-time emeritus professor of the university of Delhi at its department of physics and astrophysics. He has produced many PhD's who now occupy leading academic positions.

== Scientific Research ==
Mitra has made several original research contributions in the field of nuclear and particle physics. His prominent contributions include: (i) exact solution of the nuclear 3-body problem with separable potentials which offered a new insight into the structure of the 3-body wave function leading to "few-nucleon studies" as a new branch of physics (ii) a node in the proton electro magnetic form factor unless fermion quarks have an extra d.o.f. a forerunner for the discovery of "color" and (iii) the "quark-recoil effect" (in association with Marc Ross), for the understanding of enhanced heavy meson modes of decay. He has developed a comprehensive dynamical framework leading to an integrated view of the dynamics of 2- and 3- body systems at successively deeper levels of compositeness, from nuclear to sub-hadronic with a formulational style designed to bridge the traditional gap between theoretical sophistication and empirical fits to data.

In the eighties he developed a powerful Bethe-Salpeter approach for the relativistic quark models and studied successfully (in collaborations with others) the meson and baryon dynamics and spectrum.

He has published more than 220 scientific articles including reviews which have received over a few thousand citations.

== Other contributions ==
Mitra has taken increasing interest in the structure of scientific ideas through articles of a general nature in Pramana, Current Science etc., as well as through invited talks. He was a Member, Board of Editors of Few-body System. He edited several books such as Few-Body Dynamics (North Holland 1976); Niels Bohr A Profile (INSA, 1985); Quantum Field Theory; India in the World of Physics: Then and Now (Pearson Education, New Delhi, 2008); and a monograph Basic Building Blocks (INSA, 1984).

== Books authored/edited by Asoke Nath Mitra ==
- Pion-nucleon scattering at high energies, Cornell University, 1955
- Few Body Dynamics, edited by Asoke N. Mitra, Ivo Slaus, V. S. Bhasin and V. K. Gupta, North-Holland, 1976
- Niels Bohr: A Profile, edited by A. N. Mitra, L. S. Kothari, V. Singh and S. K. Trehan, Indian National Science Academy, New Delhi, 1985
- Quantum Field Theory: A Twentieth Century Profile, American Mathematical Society, 2001. ISBN 81-85931-25-9
- India in the World of Physics: Then and Now, edited by Asoke N. Mitra, Pearson Education India, 2009. ISBN 81-317-1579-5.

== Awards and honours ==
- Shanti Swarup Bhatnagar Prize (1969).
- UGC National Lecturer (1973)
- UGC National Fellow (1975–78)
- Meghnad Saha Award (1975)
- SN Bose Medal of INSA (1986)
- Fellow, Indian National Science Academy, New Delhi
- Fellow, Indian Academy of Sciences, Bangalore
- Fellow, National Academy of Sciences (India), Allahabad
- Fellow, The World Academy of Sciences for the advancement of science in developing countries (TWAS), Trieste
