= Delhi University =

Central university in Delhi, India

University of Delhi
- Official seal of Delhi University
- Other name: DU
- Motto: Niṣṭhā dhṛtiḥ satyam (Sanskrit)
- Motto in English: Dedication, Steadfastness and Truth
- Type: Central University, Institute Of National Importance, Institute of Eminence
- Established: 1 May 1922; 104 years ago
- Founder: Maurice Gwyer
- Accreditation: NAAC (A++)
- Academic affiliations: UGC; AIU; ACU; Universitas 21; NCTE; BCI
- Endowment: ₹1,312.33 crore (US$140 million) (2025-2026)
- Chancellor: Vice President of India
- Vice-Chancellor: Yogesh Singh
- Visitor: President of India
- Faculty: 1,402
- Undergraduates: 114,494
- Postgraduates: 21,628
- Doctoral students: 3,502
- Location: North Delhi, Delhi, India; 28.69°N 77.21°E
- Campus: Urban
- Language: English; Hindi
- Colours: Royal Purple
- Mascots: Elephant (Strength and wisdom)
- Website: www.du.ac.in

The University of Delhi is a collegiate research central university located in Delhi, India. It was founded in 1922 by an Act of the Central Legislative Assembly. The Vice President of India serves as the university chancellor and the President of India is the Visitor of the University. The university is ranked 5th by National Institutional Ranking Framework 2025 in University.

== History ==
The University of Delhi was established in 1922 and was created by an act of the Central Legislative Assembly. Hari Singh Gour served as the university's first Vice-Chancellor from 1922 to 1926.

Only four colleges existed in Delhi at the time, which were affiliated with University of the Punjab at that time :

- St. Stephen's College, founded in 1881
- Hindu College, founded in 1899
- Zakir Husain Delhi College, (then known as The Delhi College), founded in 1792
- Ramjas College, founded in 1917

All of the above colleges were subsequently affiliated with the university. The university initially had two faculties (Arts and Science) and approximately 750 students.

The seat of power in British India had been transferred from Calcutta to Delhi in 1911. The Viceregal Lodge Estate became the residence of the Viceroy of India until October 1933, when it was given to the University of Delhi. Since then, it has housed the office of the vice-chancellor and other offices.

When Sir Maurice Gwyer came to India in 1937 to serve as Chief Justice of British India, he became the Vice-Chancellor of the University of Delhi. During his time, postgraduate teaching courses were introduced, and laboratories were established at the university. Members of the faculty included Daulat Singh Kothari in Physics and Panchanan Maheshwari in Botany. Gwyer has been called the "maker of the university". He served as Vice-Chancellor until 1950.

The silver jubilee year of the university in 1947 coincided with India's independence, and the national flag was hoisted in the main building for the first time by Vijayendra Kasturi Ranga Varadaraja Rao. In that year, there was no convocation ceremony due to the partition of India. Instead, a special ceremony was held in 1948, attended by then Prime Minister of India Jawaharlal Nehru, as well as by Lord Mountbatten, Lady Mountbatten, Abul Kalam Azad, Zakir Husain and Shanti Swaroop Bhatnagar. Twenty-five years later, the golden jubilee celebrations of 1973 were attended by the then Prime Minister of India Indira Gandhi, Satyajit Ray, Amrita Pritam, and M. S. Subbulakshmi.

== Present form ==
The university has grown into one of the largest universities in India. There are 16 faculties, 86 academic departments, 91 colleges spread across the city, with 132,435 regular students (114,494 undergraduates and 17,941 postgraduates). There are 261,169 students in non-formal education programmes (258,831 undergraduates and 2,338 postgraduates). DU's chemistry, geology, zoology, sociology, and history departments have been awarded the status of Centres of Advanced Studies. In addition, a number of the university's departments receive grants under the Special Assistance Programme of the University Grants Commission in recognition of their outstanding academic work.

From the year 2022, DU changed its admission pattern from the 12th percentage mark based to CUET (Common University Entrance Test). Now it will admit students based on their CUET scores. And the 12th class percentage marks will act as a tie-breaker for students securing the same CUET scores. Delhi University Students Union (DUSU) is the representative body of the students from member colleges, and was established in 1949.

DU is one of the most sought-after institutions of higher education in India. It also has one of the highest publication counts among Indian universities.

The annual honorary degree ceremony of the university has been conferred upon several people, including film actor Amitabh Bachchan, former Chief Minister of Delhi Sheila Dikshit, cartoonist R. K. Laxman, chemist C. N. R. Rao and former Prime Minister of the United Kingdom Gordon Brown.

== Campuses ==
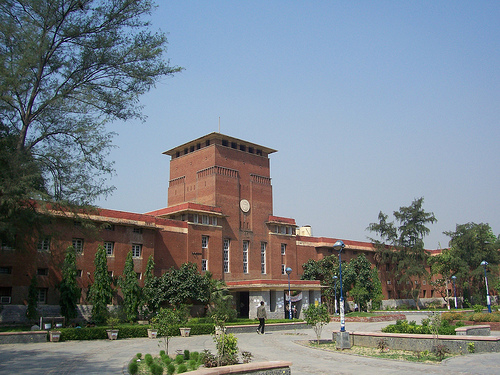
Faculty of Arts

=== Main campuses with constituent colleges ===
North Campus, the oldest campus, and South Campus, serve as the two main campuses of the university, though constituent colleges are clustered in five campuses directionally-named to correspond to the geography of Delhi (see also the list of districts of Delhi).

- North Campus northwest of Northern Delhi Ridge: the main hub hosts the three founding colleges (co-ed Hindu College, co-ed St. Stephen's College, and women-only Miranda House College) and major administrative offices including vice-chancellor's office and residence at historic Viceregal Lodge.

- South Campus south of Central Delhi Ridge: Established in 1973 to facilitate the growing needs of the city, this campus houses various postgraduate departments and renowned colleges like Lady Shri Ram College, Jesus and Mary College, Sri Aurobindo College and Sri Venkateswara College. It moved to its present location on Benito Juarez Marg, near Dhaula Kuan, in 1984, and covers 69 acres.

- Central Campus in core Delhi in Central Delhi district: includes Lady Irwin College at Mandi House, Zakir Husain Delhi College at Ajmeri Gate, Mata Sundri College for Women, Maulana Azad Medical College.

- East Campus in trans-Yamuna East Delhi district: Includes colleges located in the eastern regions of Delhi, such as Maharaja Agrasen College and Vivekananda College.

- West Campus in West Delhi district: Comprises institutions in the western parts of the city, including Bhaskaracharya College of Applied Sciences at Dwarka, and Indira Gandhi Institute of Physical Education and Sports Sciences at Janakpuri. In 2025, new Rs 107 crore 15.25 acre academic block at Dwarka and a new Veer Savarkar College costing Rs 140 crore in Najafgarh were under construction.

=== Colleges ===
There are 91 colleges affiliated to the University of Delhi, spread across Delhi. Zakir Husain Delhi College, in the central Delhi, is the oldest college in Delhi. In the University of Delhi, the primary distinction between constituent and affiliated colleges lies in their legal governance and financial backing. While constituent colleges were traditionally the only ones offering postgraduate courses, today the distinction has largely blurred for students because both types follow the same Common University Entrance Test (CUET) test-based admissions, centralized DU curriculum, and common examination system.

- Constituent colleges are integral parts of the university's "body corporate" and are typically fully funded by the University Grants Commission (UGC) or the university itself, meaning their staff salaries and infrastructure costs are directly managed through central university channels.
- Affiliated colleges are often established by private trusts or the Government of Delhi, which provides their primary funding (sometimes 100% or a 95% grant-in-aid model), though they remain "admitted to the privileges" of the university for academic purposes.

=== Hostels ===
Some colleges of Delhi University offer hostel facilities to students, but this facility is limited to a specific number of colleges. The allotment of hostels is also done on a merit basis. As of 2021, only 20 colleges of Delhi University provided hostel facilities to students. In 2025, plans were unveiled to expand Geetanjali Girls Hostel in South Campus at the cost of Rs 11.23 crore, and the construction of the new gender-inclusive 9 storey Institution of Eminence Hostel for 1,436 students at Dhaka in North Campus costing Rs 332.83 crore.

== Organisation and administration ==
=== Governance ===
The President of India is the Visitor, the Vice President of India is the Chancellor and the Chief Justice of India is the Pro-Chancellor of the university. The Court, the Executive Council, the Academic Council and the Finance Committee are the administrative authorities of the university.

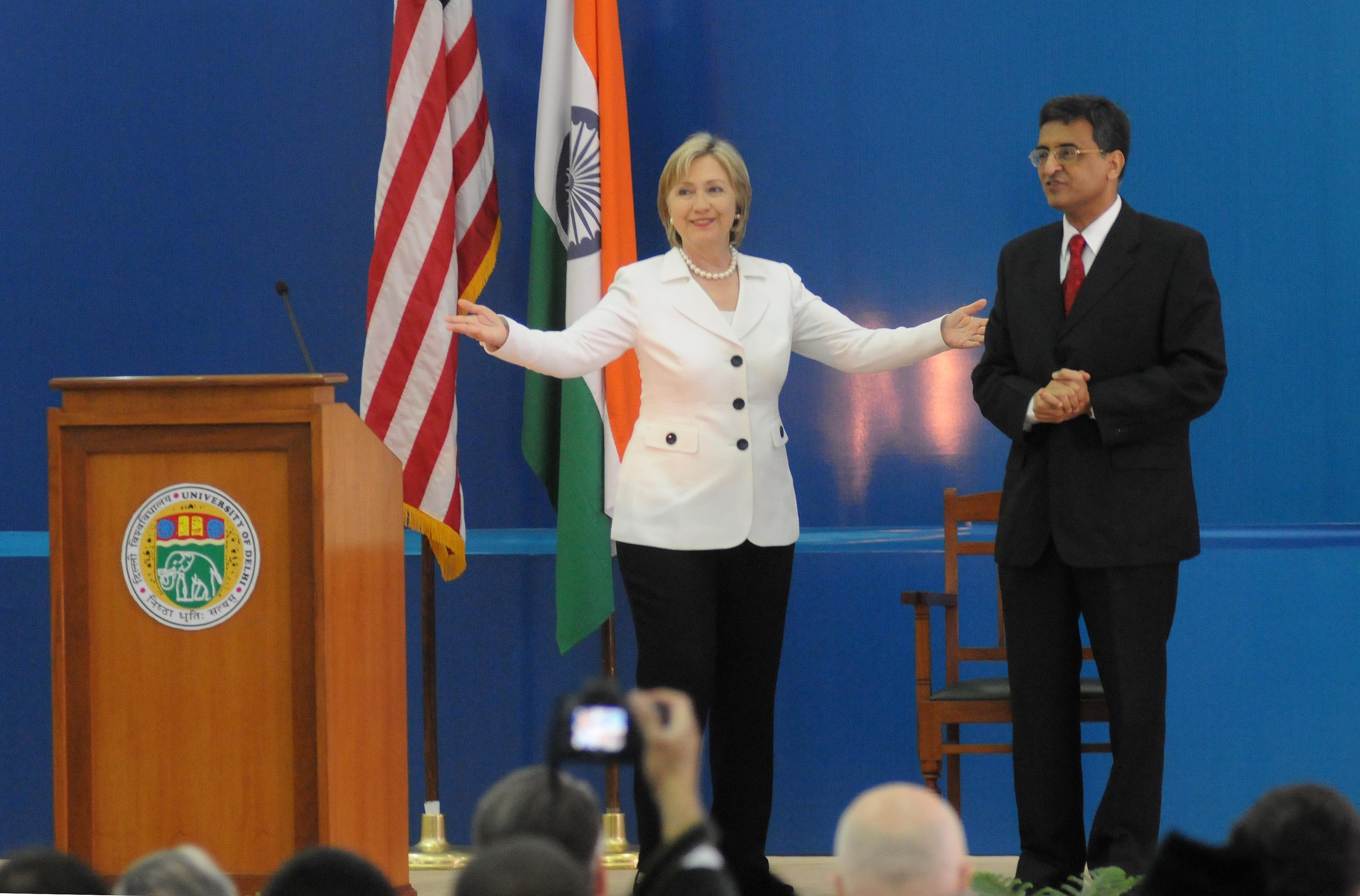
U.S. Secretary of State Hillary Clinton speaks at the University of Delhi, India 19 July 2009

The University Court is the supreme authority of the university and has the power to review the acts of the Executive Council and the Academic Council. The Executive Council is the highest executive body of the university. The Academic Council is the highest academic body of the university and is responsible for the maintenance of standards of instruction, education, and examination within the university. It has the right to advise the Executive Council on all academic matters. The Finance Committee is responsible for recommending financial policies, goals, and budgets.

== Colleges ==
Though the colleges are all constituent to the University of Delhi, as it is a collegiate university, depending upon the funding Delhi Colleges broadly fall into three categories:

- Colleges established by Educational or Charitable Trusts.
- Colleges are maintained by the Delhi Administration, which acts as a trust for them.
- Colleges maintained by the University of Delhi.

The colleges maintained by universities get 100% deficit maintenance grants while the colleges run by trusts get 95% deficit grants.

The university has 65 colleges that offer liberal courses in humanities, social sciences, and science. Twenty-five of these colleges are affiliated with the South Campus while the others are to the North Campus. The total number of colleges under the university is 77 if the colleges that run professional courses are included. Some colleges also offer evening courses. The university includes an undergraduate management college 'Shaheed Sukhdev College of Business Studies, which is ranked as the best B-school in the country at this level, by India Today.

Name	Established	Location/Campus
Aditi Mahavidyalaya, Bawana	1994	North Campus
Zakir Husain Delhi College, Ajmeri Gate	1696	North Campus
Daulat Ram College	1960	North Campus
Hindu College	1899	North Campus
Hansraj College	1948	North Campus
Indraprastha College for Women, Kashmere Gate	1924	North Campus
Kirori Mal College	1954	North Campus
Miranda House	1948	North Campus
Ramjas College	1917	North Campus
St. Stephen's College	1881	North Campus
Shaheed Sukhdev College of Business Studies, Rohini	1987	North Campus
Shri Ram College of Commerce	1926	North Campus
Sri Guru Tegh Bahadur Khalsa College	1951	North Campus
School of Open Learning	1962	North Campus
Swami Shraddhanand College, Alipur	1967	North Campus
Vallabhbhai Patel Chest Institute	1949	North Campus
Acharya Narendra Dev College, Govindpuri	1991	South Campus
Aryabhatta College	1973	South Campus
Atma Ram Sanatan Dharma College	1959	South Campus
Delhi College of Arts and Commerce, Netaji Nagar	1987	South Campus
Jesus and Mary College, Chanakyapuri	1968	South Campus
Maitreyi College, Chanakyapuri	1967	South Campus
Motilal Nehru College	1964	South Campus
Motilal Nehru College (Evening)	1965	South Campus
Ram Lal Anand College	1964	South Campus
Sri Venkateswara College	1961	South Campus
College of Vocational Studies, Sheikh Sarai	1972	South Campus
Delhi Institute of Pharmaceutical Sciences and Research, Pushp Vihar	1964	South Campus
Deshbandhu College, Kalkaji	1952	South Campus
Dyal Singh College, Lodhi Colony	1959	South Campus
Gargi College, Siri Fort	1967	South Campus
Institute of Home Economics, Hauz Khas	1961	South Campus
Kamala Nehru College Siri Fort	1964	South Campus
Lady Shri Ram College for Women, Lajpat Nagar	1956	South Campus
P.G.D.A.V. College, Lajpat Nagar	1957	South Campus
P.G.D.A.V. College (Evening)	1958	South Campus
Rajkumari Amrit Kaur College of Nursing, Lajpat Nagar	1946	South Campus
Ramanujan College, Kalkaji	2010	South Campus
Sri Aurobindo College, Malviya Nagar	1972	South Campus
Sri Aurobindo College (Evening)	1984	South Campus
Shaheed Bhagat Singh College, Sheikh Sarai	1967	South Campus
Shaheed Bhagat Singh College (Evening)	1973	South Campus
Dyal Singh Evening College	1958	South Campus
Ayurvedic and Unani Tibbia College, Karol Bagh	1916	Central Campus
College of Art, Mandi House	1942	Central Campus
Janki Devi Memorial College, Rajinder Nagar	1959	Central Campus
Lady Hardinge Medical College, Connaught Place	1916	Central Campus
Lady Irwin College, Mandi House	1932	Central Campus
Mata Sundri College for Women, Mandi House	1967	Central Campus
Maulana Azad Institute of Dental Sciences, ITO	2003	Central Campus
Maulana Azad Medical College, ITO	1956	Central Campus
Sri Guru Nanak Dev Khalsa College, Karol Bagh	1973	Central Campus
Zakir Husain Delhi College	1792	Central Campus
Zakir Husain Delhi College (Evening)	1958	Central Campus
Maharaja Agrasen College, Vasundhara Enclave	1994	East Delhi
Maharshi Valmiki College of Education, Geeta Colony	1996	East Delhi
Shaheed Rajguru College of Applied Sciences for Women, Vasundhara Enclave	1989	East Delhi
Shyam Lal College, Shahdara	1964	East Delhi
Shyam Lal College (Evening)	1969	East Delhi
Vivekananda College, Jhilmil Colony	1970	East Delhi
Nehru Homoeopathic Medical College and Hospital, Defence Colony	1967	South Delhi
Bhim Rao Ambedkar College, Shahdara	1991	North East Delhi
University College of Medical Sciences, Dilshad Garden	1971	North East Delhi
Bharati College, Janakpuri	1971	West Delhi
Deen Dayal Upadhyaya College, Dwarka	1990	West Delhi
Indira Gandhi Institute of Physical Education and Sports Sciences, Vikaspuri	1987	West Delhi
Kalindi College, Patel Nagar	1967	West Delhi
Rajdhani College, Bali Nagar	1964	West Delhi
Shivaji College, Raja Garden	1961	West Delhi
Shyama Prasad Mukherji College, Punjabi Bagh	1969	West Delhi
Keshav Mahavidyalaya, Pitampura	1994	North West Delhi
Lakshmibai College, Ashok Vihar	1965	North West Delhi
Satyawati College, Ashok Vihar	1972	North West Delhi
Satyawati College (Evening)	1973	North West Delhi
Sri Guru Gobind Singh College of Commerce, Pitampura	1984	North West Delhi
Bhagini Nivedita College, Kair Village	1993	South West Delhi
Lady Irwin College	1932	South West Delhi
Bhaskaracharya College of Applied Sciences, Dwarka	1995	South West Delhi

=== Faculties ===
Faculty of Social Sciences and Mathematical Sciences

==== Main ====
The University of Delhi's 86 academic departments are divided into 16 faculties.

- Faculty of Applied Social Sciences & Humanities
- Faculty of Arts
- Faculty of Commerce and Business Studies
- Faculty of Education
- Faculty of Interdisciplinary and Applied Sciences
- Faculty of Law
- Faculty of Management Studies
- Faculty of Mathematical Sciences
- Faculty of Medical Sciences
- Faculty of Music and Fine Arts
- Faculty of Open Learning: The faculty is concerned with distance education.
- Faculty of Science
- Faculty of Social Sciences
- Faculty of Technology

In the past, the Faculty of Technology offered courses in Engineering and Technology. The faculty earlier included the Delhi College of Engineering, before it was transformed into the Delhi Technological University and Netaji Subhas Institute of Technology before it was transformed into the Netaji Subhas University of Technology. It was again established in 2023.

==== Affiliated faculties ====
The University of Delhi has two affiliated faculties:

- Faculty of Ayurvedic & Unani Medicine: The faculty awards degrees to its students in Ayurvedic medicine and Unani medicine.
- Faculty of Homoeopathic Medicine: The faculty awards degrees to its students in Homoepathic medicine.

=== Centres and institutes ===
There are about 28 centres and institutes at DU. These are divided into four categories:

==== Postgraduate centres ====
- Dr. B.R. Ambedkar Centre For Biomedical Research — Dr. B.R. Ambedkar Centre for Biomedical Research is a centre where a multispecialty group of scientists participate in teaching and research in basic and applied biomedical sciences.
- Institute of Informatics and Communication – focuses on the field of communication and information technology.
- Delhi School of Economics: Commonly referred to as DSE, it is a centre of postgraduate learning. Starting in the year 1949, the campus of the Delhi School of Economics houses the University of Delhi's Departments of Economics, Commerce, Sociology and Geography.
- Delhi School of Journalism - The University of Delhi established the Delhi School of Journalism (DSJ) in 2017 and introduced a Five-Year Integrated Course in Journalism.
- School of Open Learning - offer postgraduate courses, degrees and diplomas

==== Centres ====
- Cluster Innovation Centre (DU-CIC) presents its students with an interdisciplinary study system that involves hands-on projects and connects research with application in society. CIC is supported by the National Innovation Council and aided by the Ministry of Education.
- Design Innovation Centre (DIC or DUDIC) - A design centre in North Campus established under National Initiative for Design Innovation by Ministry of Human Resource Development. It offers courses for undergraduate and postgraduate students in design thinking, innovation and entrepreneurship. The University of Delhi is the main hub and one of the 5 institutions to be granted the DIC project in the first round.
- D.S. Kothari Centre for Science, Ethics and Education – The objective of Daulat Singh Kothari Centre for Science, Ethics and Education is to raise the standard of living of the people. It is based on science and technology, and education that determines the level of prosperity, welfare and security of the people.
- Agricultural Economics Research Centre – The centre was established and is completely funded by the Ministry of Agriculture of India to carry out research related to the rural economy and agriculture in India. Since then, the centre has completed more than hundreds of policy-oriented studies for the Ministry of Agriculture.
- Centre for Environmental Management of Degraded Ecosystem – The centre works towards strengthening awareness, research and training in priority areas of environmental management of degraded ecosystems. The centre coordinates with the other departments of SES, viz. Department of Environmental Biology and Centre for Interdisciplinary Studies of Mountain & Hill Environment on issues of biodiversity conservation, habitat loss, pollution and rehabilitation of displaced people due to developmental activities.
- Centre for Inter-disciplinary Studies of Mountain & Hill Environment – The concept of the centre revolves around the idea that the upland areas play a crucial role in the production and regeneration of natural resources like fresh water, and forests, besides sustaining a rich genetic diversity of plant and animal life.
- The Centre for Professional Development in Higher Education provides opportunities for professional and career development to teachers across the universities of India. CPDHE helps build competence in research methodologies and pedagogy, and expands technologies in ICT, Science and Technology, Environment and Education.
- The Centre For Science Education & Communication is for the pursuit and teaching of science. It is an autonomous institution in which studies can be carried out by teachers, students and other interested individuals, for the generation of ideas and materials for the improvement of science education at the university and school levels; and for the promotion of a wider interest in science and scientific issues, through all means of communications.
- Developing Countries Research Centre – Its objective is to address political and intellectual issues that emerge from the study of the post-colonial world and integrate these insights into teaching at the undergraduate, postgraduate and research levels. Scholars in Political Science, Economics, Sociology, History, Education, philosophy, Psychology and Literature have been involved in the effort.
- The Women's Study Development Centre is the focal point for women's and gender studies in the university. The activities of WSDC place women and gender at the centre of its inquiry focusing mostly on multidisciplinary perspectives of class, caste, race, ethnicity, sexuality, religion, and age. It also addresses other socio-political issues concerning women.
- The University Science Instrumentation Centre (USIC) is a central facility and houses analytical instruments. Its objective is to provide services to all researchers and students of science departments in the university and the constituent colleges of the University of Delhi.

==== Recognised institutes ====
- The Institute of Life Long Learning (ILLL) is dedicated to the cause of those who believe that learning is not age-bound nor classroom-bound, but it takes place throughout life and in a variety of situations.
- The Ahilya Bai College of Nursing is a nursing institute. It provides practical exposure to their students, which helps them in acquiring in-depth knowledge of nursing.
- The Amar Jyoti Institute of Physiotherapy offers degrees in physiotherapy.
- The Durgabai Deshmukh College of Special Education is for blind students. The undergraduate course Special Education for Visually Impaired students has a motto to empower visually impaired pupils.
- Pt. Deen Dayal Upadhyaya Institute for the Physically Handicapped is an autonomous organisation under the administrative and financial control of the Ministry of Social Justice & Empowerment, Government of India. It provides education to people with disabilities.
- School of Rehabilitation Sciences – It aims to disseminate knowledge on developmental therapy and special education in rehabilitation sciences.

==== Affiliated institutions ====
- Army Hospital Research and Referral
- Central Health Education Bureau
- G.B. Pant Hospital
- Hindu Rao Hospital
- Institute of Human Behaviour and Allied Sciences
- Institute of Nuclear Medicine & Allied Sciences
- Kasturba Hospital
- National Institute of Health & Family Welfare
- Nehru Homeopathic Medical College & Hospital

== Academics ==
=== Courses ===
There are 240 courses available at the university for undergraduate (UG) and post-graduate (PG).

There are a total 201 courses offered by Delhi University like MBBS, B.Tech., LL.B etc. Courses are mainly classified under the three faculties of the central university, including arts, commerce and science.

The university offers 70 post-graduate degrees. DU also offers MPhil in about 28 subjects. In addition to these, it offers 90+ Certificate courses and 28 Diplomas. There are 15 Advanced Diplomas offered in various languages. The university offers PhD courses, which may be awarded by any faculty of the university under ordinance VI-B.

On the other side, speciality and super speciality medical degrees like DM, DCh etc., could only be awarded by the faculty of medical sciences. Due to lack of surety in quality of legal education, The Bar Council of India has issued a notification asking Delhi University (DU) to shut down law courses offered in evening shift at its colleges.

=== Rankings ===
University rankings

General – international
- ARWU (2022): 601-700
- QS (World) (2025): 328

General – India
- NIRF (Overall) (2024): 15
- NIRF (Research) (2024): 14
- NIRF (Universities) (2024): 6

Internationally, the University of Delhi was ranked 328 in the QS World University Rankings of 2025 and 81 in Asia. It was ranked 801–1000 in the world by the Times Higher Education World University Rankings of 2025, 201–250 in Asia in 2025. It was ranked 601–700 in the Academic Ranking of World Universities of 2025.

In India, it was ranked 15 overall by the National Institutional Ranking Framework (NIRF) in 2024 and 6 among universities. In 2025, it was ranked 5th by the NIRF.

== Sports ==
The Delhi University Stadium is a rugby sevens stadium, situated within the North Campus. Spread over 10,000 square metres (110,000 sq ft), the stadium has a seating capacity of 2,500 permanent and 7,500 temporary seats. Construction began in 2008 and the stadium was inaugurated in July 2010, ahead of the 2010 Commonwealth Games. It also includes a training area for netball, boxing, women's wrestling and athletics.

After the games the stadium was handed over to the university by Commonwealth Games Organising Committee, there after in 2011, the university initiated an upgrade plan, to create a multi-purpose arena with both outdoor and indoor facilities. The university opened access to these facilities in late 2011.

== Notable alumni and faculty ==
=== Notable alumni ===
Notable alumni in Indian politics include: lawyer and former Minister of Finance Arun Jaitley; Foreign Secretary of India Vijay Keshav Gokhale; Minister of External Affairs S. Jaishankar; former diplomat, writer and Member of Parliament Shashi Tharoor; the fifth President of India Fakhruddin Ali Ahmed; sixth Chief Minister of Delhi Sheila Dikshit; fourth Chief Minister of Uttar Pradesh and India's first woman Chief Minister Sucheta Kriplani; economist and former leader of the Janata Party Subramanian Swamy; fourteenth Chief Minister of Odisha Naveen Patnaik; industrialist and former Member of Parliament Naveen Jindal; diplomat and Foreign Secretary Jyotindra Nath Dixit; former Deputy Chairman of the Planning Commission Montek Singh Ahluwalia; former Minister of State for Corporate and Minority Affairs Salman Khurshid; former Union HRD Minister Kapil Sibal; former Minister of Information and Broadcasting Ambika Soni; former Union Minister for Disinvestment Arun Shourie; former Chief Minister of Delhi and Governor of Rajasthan Madan Lal Khurana; former MLA of Lakhipur Rajdeep Goala; Rekha Gupta, Chief Minister of Delhi, President of Jawaharlal Nehru University Students' Union Aishe Ghosh and Deputy Chief Minister of Odisha, Kanak Vardhan Singh Deo.

DU has educated numerous foreign politicians and heads of state and government including State Counsellor of Myanmar Aung San Suu Kyi, third President of Malawi Bingu wa Mutharika, former Prime Minister of Nepal Girija Prasad Koirala, sixth President of Pakistan Muhammad Zia-ul-Haq, sixteenth Prime Minister of Sri Lanka Harini Amarasuriya and two former Prime Ministers of Bhutan, Sangay Ngedup, and Khandu Wangchuk.

DU has also produced a large number of major actors and actresses of Indian cinema and theatre including Amitabh Bachchan, Shah Rukh Khan, Manoj Bajpayee, Konkona Sen Sharma, Anurag Kashyap, Arjun Rampal, Imran Zahid, Neha Dhupia, Sakshi Tanwar, Mallika Sherawat, Imtiaz Ali, Huma Qureshi, Siddharth, Sushant Singh Rajput, Shriya Saran, Vishal Bhardwaj, Sandhya Mridul, Aditi Rao Hydari, Shekhar Kapur, Deepa Mehta, Nimrat Kaur, Kabir Khan, Aditi Arya, Sidharth Malhotra, Karan Oberoi (model) and Triptii Dimri. The CWE wrestler Shanky Singh had also pursued B.Com. from Maharaja Agrasen College of Delhi University. Singer Papon was also enrolled in Motilal Nehru College

Notable DU alumni in poetry and literature include the Sahitya Akademi Award winning dramatist and playwright Harcharan Singh, the Urdu poet Akhtar ul Iman, and the writers Vikram Seth, Anita Desai (Shortlisted for the Booker Prize three times), Amitav Ghosh, Kunzang Choden, Upamanyu Chatterjee, Ali Sardar Jafri, and the Padma Vibhushan recipient Khushwant Singh.

Notable alumni in the sciences include physicist Archana Bhattacharyya, theoretical physicist Pran Nath, SLAC physicist Jogesh Pati particle physicist Amitava Raychaudhuri, astrophysicist Vinod Krishan, chemists Charusita Chakravarty and Anil Kumar Tyagi, engineer and "father of the pentium processor" Vinod Dham, mathematician Eknath Prabhakar Ghate, astrophysicist Sangeeta Malhotra, engineer Yogi Goswami, neurosurgeon B. K. Misra (1st vice-president of World Federation of Neurosurgical Societies), and biomaterials researcher Sanjukta Deb.

Notable alumni in the humanities and social sciences include First Deputy Managing Director of economics at IMF Gita Gopinath; economist and Senior Vice-president and Chief Economist of the World Bank Kaushik Basu; historians Arundhati Virmani, Ramnarayan Rawat, Upinder Singh and Usha Sanyal; professor of anthropology at Johns Hopkins University Veena Das; Kathak dancer Uma Sharma; Bharatnatyam dancer Geeta Chandran; gender rights activist Meera Khanna and IPS officer and politician Kiran Bedi

Notable alumni in the field of business include Tesla CFO Vaibhav Taneja, World Bank president Ajay Banga and managing director and editor-in-chief of Republic Media Network Arnab Goswami.

=== Notable academics ===
Notable faculty members of DU include eminent historians like Ram Sharan Sharma and Ramachandra Guha; recipient of the Nobel Memorial Prize in Economic Sciences Amartya Sen; former Prime Minister of India Manmohan Singh; economist and a key architect of the Five-Year Plans of India Sukhamoy Chakravarty; senior fellow for international economics at the Council on Foreign Relations and professor of economics at Columbia University Jagdish Bhagwati; and Ra'ana Liaquat Ali Khan, a leading woman figure in the Pakistan Movement and wife of the first Prime Minister of Pakistan Liaquat Ali Khan.

== See also ==
- Delhi University Community Radio
- List of Delhi University people
- List of colleges affiliated to the Delhi University
- List of institutions of higher education in Delhi
- University of Oxford v. Rameshwari Photocopy Service
- University Grants Commission (India)
- Institutes of National Importance
