= Karan Oberoi =

Karan Oberoi may refer to:

- Karan Oberoi (singer), Indian singer and television actor
- Karan Oberoi (model) (born 1987), Indian fitness and fashion model
