= Psych-Ed =

Indian psychology quiz

Psych-Ed is an annual national psychology quiz held for school students in India.

== Background ==
Psych-Ed is India's first psychology quiz, inaugurated in 2016. The quiz is held annually in August and September.

The main objective of the quiz is to address the mental health concerns among the youth in India. The quiz was conceptualized and executed by Dr. Samir Parikh, Director of Department Mental Health & Behavioural Sciences at Fortis Healthcare.

== Format ==
The format of the quiz is designed to teach psychological concepts. The different rounds include rollover, riddle, puzzle, wipe out round, and minus point rounds. The quiz tests the knowledge of psychology and allied sciences, making students think analytically and methodically.

Psych-Ed is conducted in 3 rounds. A school can register one team of 3 students to participate in the quiz. The first round is an online multiple choice question round. 72 zonal finalists are selected for round 2 on the basis of the scores of round 1. 12 teams per zone are selected to represent the 6 zones. The zonal rounds are conducted at Delhi-NCR, Mumbai, Kolkata, Bengaluru, Mohali and Jaipur. For the grand finale, 6 winners from the zonal rounds compete at Delhi-NCR. The final round includes diverse activities, and the team with the highest score is declared the winner of Psych-Ed for that year.

=== Events ===
- 2016: The first round was held in August 2016. More than 200 schools in India registered for the first edition of the quiz. Bal Bharti Public School, Pitampura, New Delhi was declared the winner at the first edition of the quiz competition.
- 2017: In 2017, over 460 schools from across 90 Indian cities participated in Psych-Ed and over a thousand students participated in the quiz.
- 2018: Online registrations closed on 30 July 2018.
