= Pitampura TV Tower =

Television tower in Delhi, India

Coordinates: 28.69721°N 77.15035°E

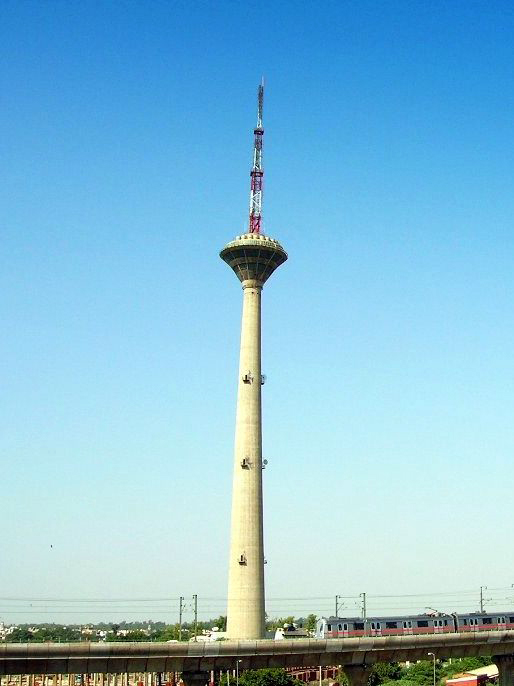
- Pitampura TV Tower, built in 1988
- Interactive map of the Pitampura TV Tower area

General information
- Status: Completed
- Location: Pitampura, New Delhi, India
- Completed: 1988
- Opened: 10 April 1992

Height
- Antenna spire: 235 m (771.0 ft)

Pitampura TV Tower is a 235-metre (771 ft)-tall television tower, built in 1988, with an observation deck that is located in Pitam Pura, Delhi, India.

Dilli Haat Pitampura is also situated near the TV tower. The Tower was dedicated to the Nation as Dr. B. R. Ambedkar TV Tower 10 April 1992 by the Minister for The State of Information & Broadcasting, Ajeet Kumar Panja.

== History ==
The TV tower was built in 1988, in one of the biggest commercial/business districts of New Delhi. Netaji Subhash Place in Pitampura is one of the main local tourist spots of Delhiites. Delhi's second Dilli Haat, a traditional food and crafts bazaar, was developed by Delhi Tourism and Transportation Development Corporation (DTTDC) in Pitampura, was established close to the TV Tower and spread over 7.2 hectares in April 2008. Also it has Pitampura Sports Complex by its side.

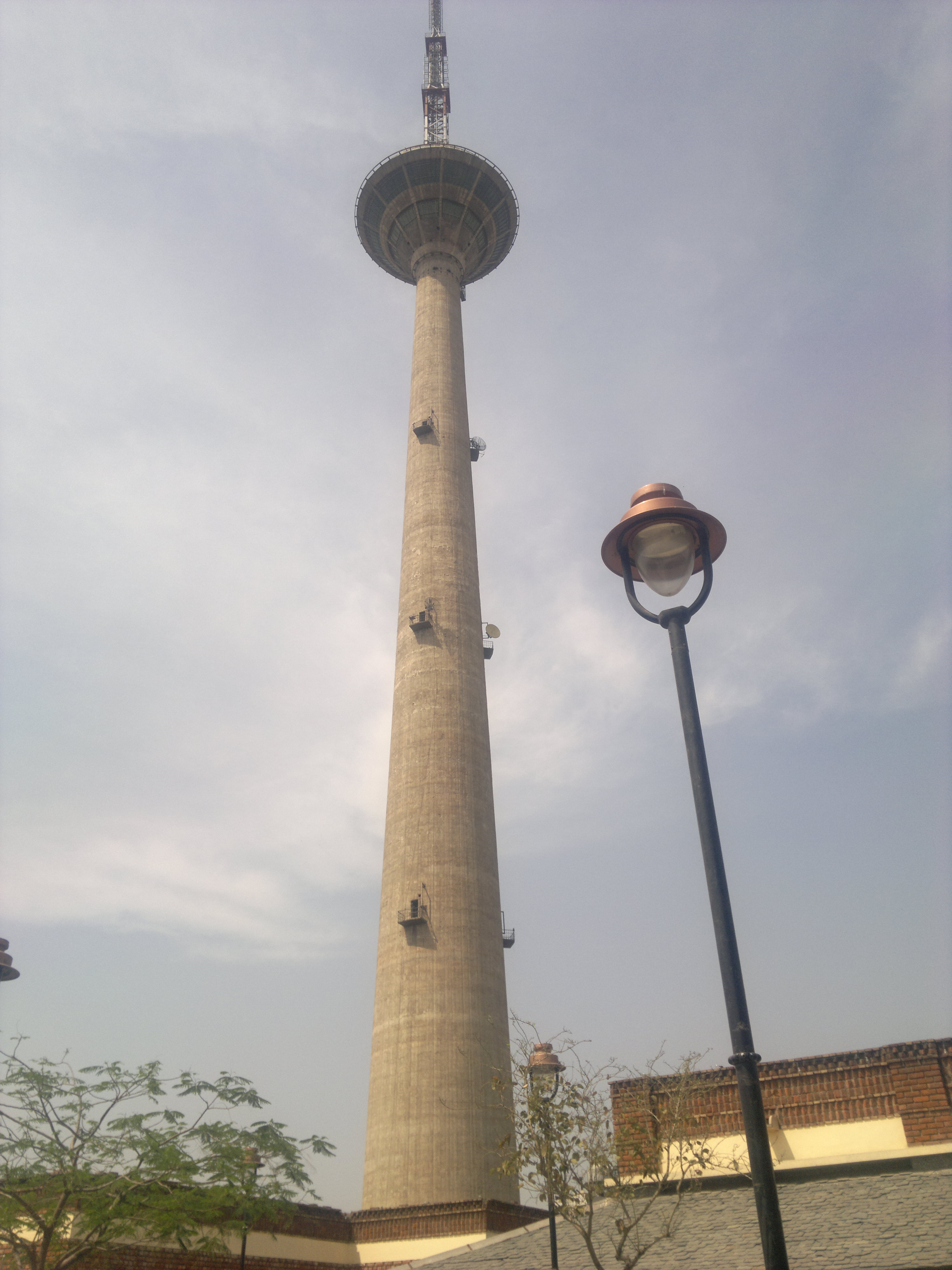
Pitampura TV tower as seen from Dilli Haat, Pitampura, New Delhi

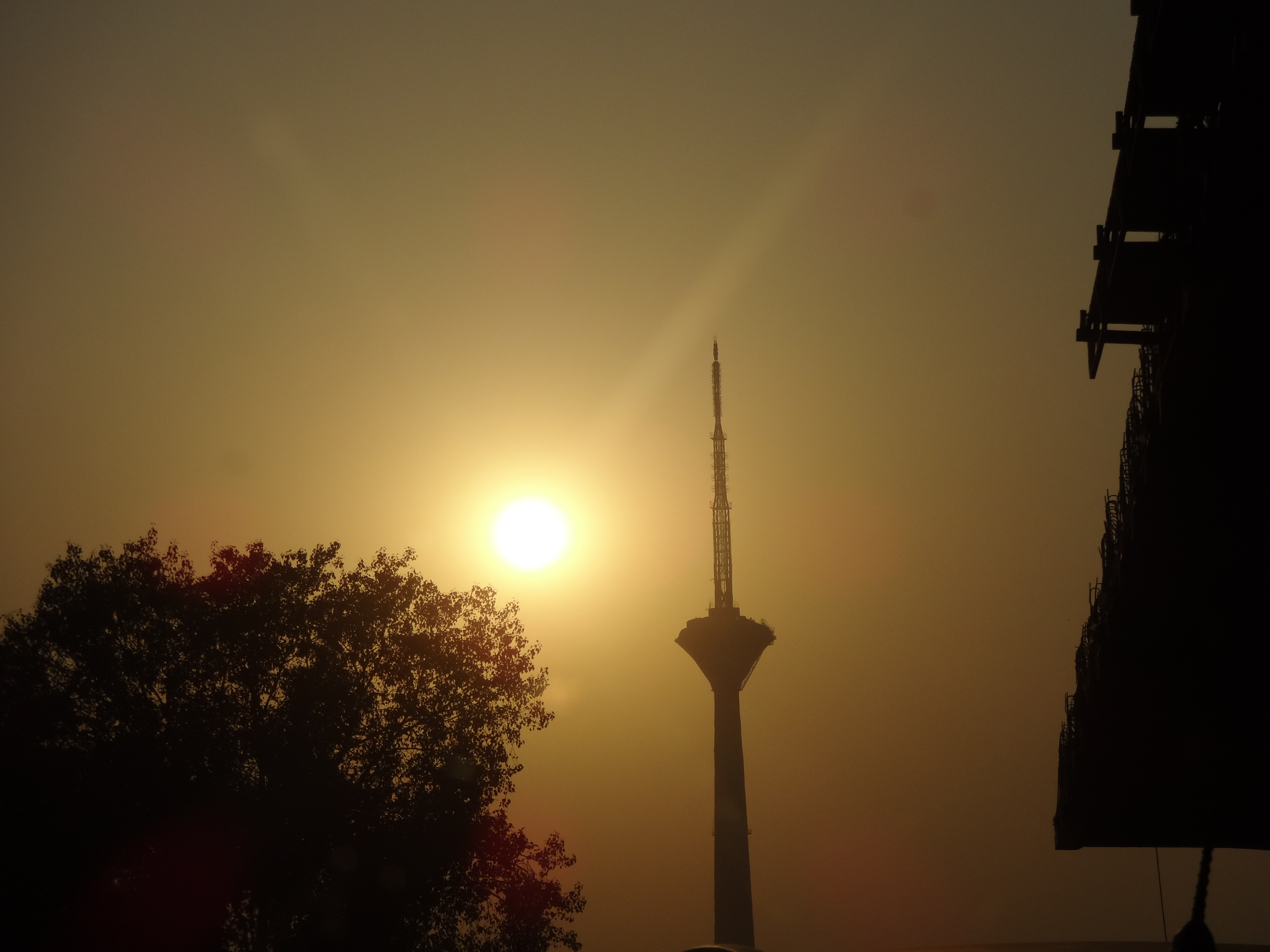
Pitampura TV Tower

In October 2010, Lt. Col. Satyendra Verma, an officer of the Indian Army Sports sky diving team, successfully performed India's first BASE jump on Friday, off the 235-metre-tall Tower. On 5 January 2013 a fire broke out within the 200m high tower around 10:30pm and took 15 fire men to control it.

== Public access ==
The tower is no longer open for the public, due to security reasons.

== Accessibility ==
It is located at Netaji Subhash Place metro station of the Red Line of Delhi Metro. The tower is named after the Pitampura area and is near Pitampura Dilli Haat of New Delhi. It is located just opposite the Sri Guru Gobind Singh College of Commerce.
