= Sri Guru Gobind Singh College of Commerce =

College of the University of Delhi, India

- Seal of the College
- Motto: Punjabi: ਮਾਨਸ਼ ਕੀ ਜਾਤਿ ਸਬੈ ਏਕੈ ਪਹਿਚਾਨਬੋ
- Motto in English: Behold All Human Race As One
- Type: College
- Established: 1984; 42 years ago
- Academic affiliations: University of Delhi
- Principal: Kawal Gill (acting)
- Location: Pitam Pura, North West Delhi, India; 28.69832°N 77.15265°E
- Campus: Urban ~10.7 acres (43,000 m^{2})
- Nicknames: GGS, SGGS, SGGSCC
- Website: www.sggscc.ac.in

Sri Guru Gobind Singh College of Commerce, often referred to by its initials SGGSCC, is a constituent college of the University of Delhi located in Delhi, India. It was founded in 1984 and is named after the tenth Sikh Guru, Sri Guru Gobind Singh Ji. It is the second college of commerce of the University of Delhi and is primarily a co-educational English medium institution. In the year 2022, the National Assessment and Accreditation Council accredited it with a CGPA of 3.54 and a NAAC A++ grade. It is also ranked 47th among colleges across India by National Institutional Ranking Framework in 2023.

The college runs undergraduate and post-graduate degrees in commerce fields. One of its flagship programmes is its B.A.(Honours) Business Economics programme.

As of the latest records, the college has a total student strength of about 2200 and teaching faculty comprising 70 teachers. The Principal is Dr J.B. Singh and the staff are mostly alumni of Delhi University.

== History ==
Sri Guru Gobind Singh College of Commerce was founded in 1984 as the second Commerce College of the University of Delhi. Strategically located near the Pitampura TV Tower, the college is managed by Delhi Sikh Gurdwara Management Committee, a statutory body, constituted under an Act of Parliament. The college is named after the tenth Sikh Guru, Sri Guru Gobind Singh Ji.

== Courses and departments ==
The institute offers courses in the commerce and economics streams. The graduate programs offered are:

- Bachelor of Commerce with Honours
- Bachelor of Arts with Honours in Economics
- Bachelor of Commerce
- Bachelor of Science with Honours in Computer Science
- Diploma in Business Journalism and Corporate Communication or (D.B.J.C.C)
- Post Graduate Diploma in International Marketing or (P.G.D.I.M)
- Bachelor of Arts with Honours in Business Economics or (B.B.E.)
- Bachelor in Management Studies or (B.M.S.)

BMS is the newest among courses offered by the college, having been rolled out in 2017-18.

== Notable Alumnis ==
- Akshay Chaturvedi, Founder and CEO of Leverage Education
- Aman Chopra, News Journalist, News18
- Jatinder Singh, Chief Editor, ET Edge, Times Group
- Puneet Beniwal, Model
- Ritvik Arora, Actor
- Ankit Bathla, Actor
- Yukti Thareja, Actress and model
- Karan Oberoi, Model

== College rankings ==
As per India Today - Nielsen 2016 College Rankings for Commerce courses, SGGSCC came in at rank 19 in a survey that consisted of more than 100 top colleges of India. It also stands 8th in Delhi University for all courses as

University rankings

General – India
- NIRF (Colleges) (2024): 39

per Nielson survey 2016.

"DUADMISSIONS.CO" has ranked the college 5th for commerce courses.

The college is ranked 39th among colleges in India by the National Institutional Ranking Framework (NIRF) in 2024.
