= Delhi University Community Radio =

Coordinates: 28.690°N 77.214°E

- Type: Private
- Industry: Community Radio
- Founded: 2007
- Headquarters: New Delhi, India
- Key people: R. K. Singh (Consultant(Technical & Program))
- Services: Radio broadcasting
- Parent: Delhi University
- Website: official site

DUCR 90.4 MHz established in 2007, is a Community Radio Station at Delhi University Stadium, University of Delhi.

It was inaugurated by Sh. Kapil Sibal, Honorable Minister of Science & Technology and Minister of Earth Sciences, Government of India on 2 October 2007. Prof. Deepak Pental, Hon’ble Vice Chancellor of the University of Delhi congratulated to the students and the community on this auspicious occasion. Prof Pental emphasized that the larger participation of faculty and students will strengthen the DUCR and make it popular among the community residing in and round Delhi University. Vijaylakshmi Sinha, former Deputy Director-General of All India Radio is supervising the project.

In 2008, the University started using the station for disseminating information about the admission process, through live phone-in programs with students and parents.

== History ==
The Telecom Regulatory Authority of India (TRAI) opened the airwaves in 2004, as it allowed educational institutions to get licence for community radio paving way many education institutions in India, including Indian Institute of Mass Communication (IIMC) at 96.9 hertz, Jamia at 90.4 hertz, to set up their own community radio stations since 2005 with a radius of 10–15 km.

== Overview ==
The programmes of DUCR 90.4 are available on IIMC Apna Radio 96.9 to enable the students and other community members residing at South Delhi to listen the programme. It has increased the range of DUCR 90.4. The DUCR 90.4 is also available on the website of School of Open Learning, University of Delhi- School of Open Learning helping all the stakeholders to listen the radio programme as per their convenience. The main thrust area of DUCR 90.4 is to broadcast student centric community based programmes such as (i) health, hygiene, anti smoking, aids, gender sensitization, environment and other issues related to local communities. (ii) Phone-in Programmes with the experts on Health, Education, stress management, Environment, interpersonal relationship between parent and children, examination stress etc. (iii) Spreading awareness among the students about various careers, career counseling and broadcasting other socially relevant programmes. (iv) Broadcasting the programmes of campus and colleges such as seminars, workshops, lectures, discussions, debates, cultural functions etc. for the student communities. (V) Conducting (including academic counseling) interactive programmes for the students enrolled at School of Open Learning, who could not get the opportunities for face to face teaching learning process. (VI) Broadcasting different community based programmes with the help of community members residing in the adopted slum areas and the community residing around Delhi University .

Since its inception, the DUCR 90.4 is broadcasting four hours programmes in two segments i.e. in the morning from 7.30 a.m. to 9.30 a.m. and in the evening from 5.00 p.m. to 7.00 p.m. daily. DUCR is very popular among the students and other communities living in and around Delhi University Campus. There is a demand to increase transmission hours and reach of DUCR. Keeping in view DUCR 90.4 is planning to increase the transmission from four hours to eight hours.

== Project Planet Earth ==
DUCR has started a science awareness project 'Planet Earth' initiated and supported by Directorate of Science and Technology, Government of India. This project is aimed towards creating awareness about science, health and sanitation issues among community women and children. Under the patronage of Mrs. Vijaya Lakshmi Sinha, Ms. Shweta Rani was appointed as Programme Producer of this project. Till now 365 episodes have been broadcast under this project. Programmes ranges from debate to Nukkad Natak, Interview to workshop with community women.
