= Institute of Informatics and Communication =

University of Delhi South Campus

- Type: Public
- Established: 1997
- Affiliations: University of Delhi
- Head of Department: Dr Sanjeev Singh
- Location: New Delhi, Delhi, India
- Campus: South Campus
- Nickname: IIC
- Website: www.iic.du.ac.in

Institute of Informatics and Communication (IIC) is a constituent institute of the University of Delhi, in New Delhi, India. The institute offers degree in Masters of Science (Informatics). The institute was established in 1997 and has an intake of 78 students. The institute provides studies in the field of informatics, which is essentially a blend of three domains: networking, telecommunication and software, on three major platforms: Windows, Linux and Macintosh.

== Notable alumni ==
- Prashant Pillai, Professor of Cyber Security and Associate Dean for Research and Knowledge Enterprise at University of Wolverhampton

== Events at IIC ==
- Techspur is an annual one-day technical seminar at IIC organised primarily aiming at strengthening the industry-academic relationship. It comprises talks by eminent personalities from the field of communication and information technology.
- REMINISCENCE:The alumni meet of IIC.
- Envisage is a national level technical festival organised annually to promote open source technical excellence. The event provides platform for students to participate from across the country. The principal aim of the fest is to facilitate the growth and exchange of knowledge and imagination among the participants of diverse educational backgrounds hailing from all over India.
