= Dilli Haat =

Permanent open-air market in Delhi, India

Coordinates: 28.573162°N 77.208511°E

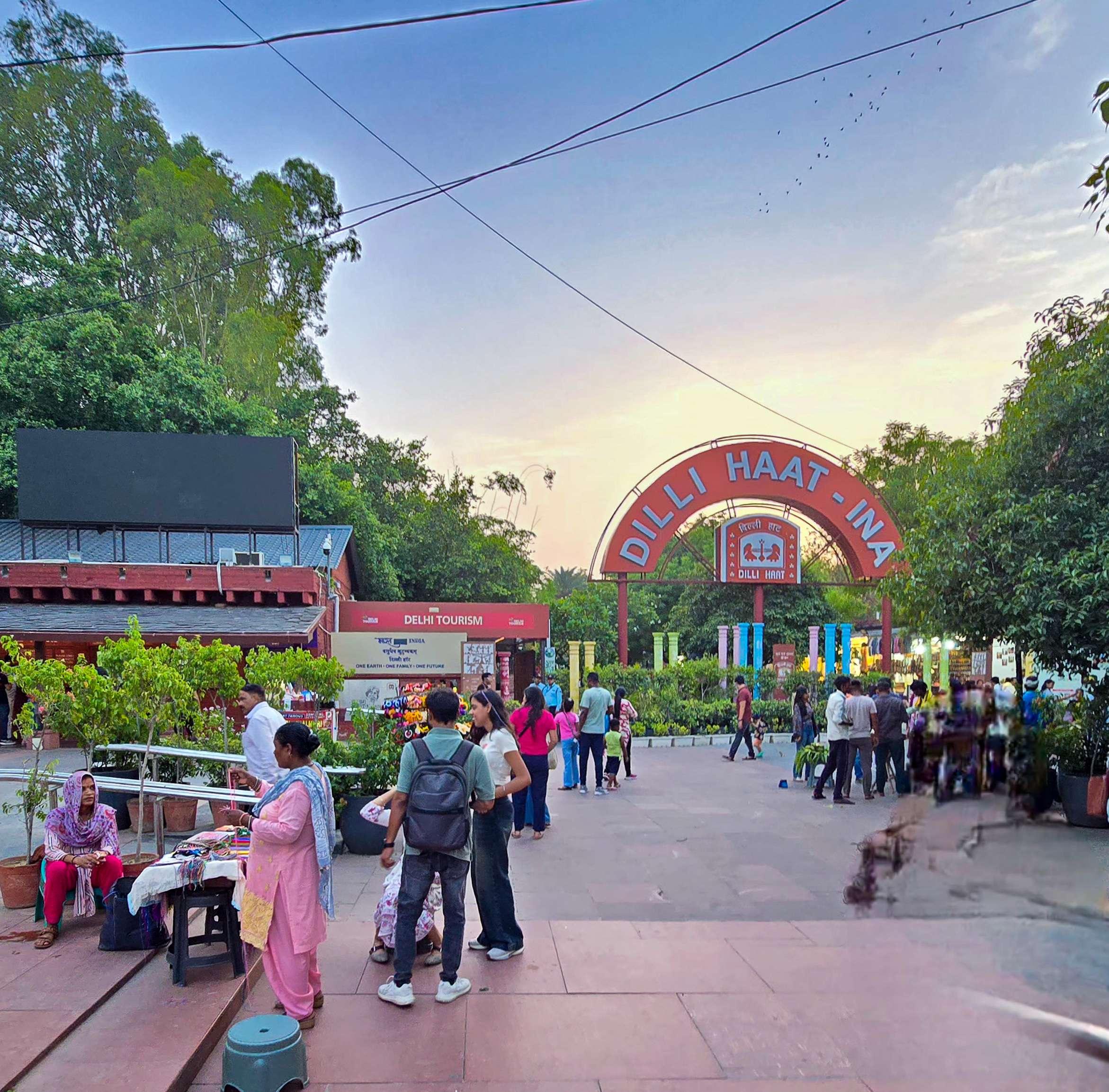
Main entrance of Dilli Haat

Dilli Haat is a paid-entrance open-air market, food plaza, and craft bazaar located in Delhi. The area is run by Delhi Tourism and Transportation Development Corporation (DTTDC), and unlike the traditional weekly market, the village Haat, Dilli Haat is permanent. It is located in the commercial centres of South Delhi, opposite INA market. The 6 acres of land on which this complex is situated was salvaged as part of a reclamation project and transformed into a plaza. Extensive foundation work, small thatched roof cottages and kiosks give the plaza a village atmosphere. Some shops are permanent but other sellers are rotated, usually for fifteen days. Products offered may include rosewood and sandalwood carvings, embellished camel hide footwear, sophisticated fabric and drapery, gems, beads, brassware, metal crafts, and silk & wool fabrics. A number of shows promoting handicrafts and handlooms are held at the exhibition hall in the complex. To sell wares, there is an application process; spaces are allocated according to which state the seller is from. In all, Dilli Haat, INA Market has 62 stalls allotted on a rotational basis to craftsmen for a payment of INR 100 per day for a maximum period of 15 days.

Visitors can enjoy live music, dance performances, and art exhibitions that represent the various states of India.

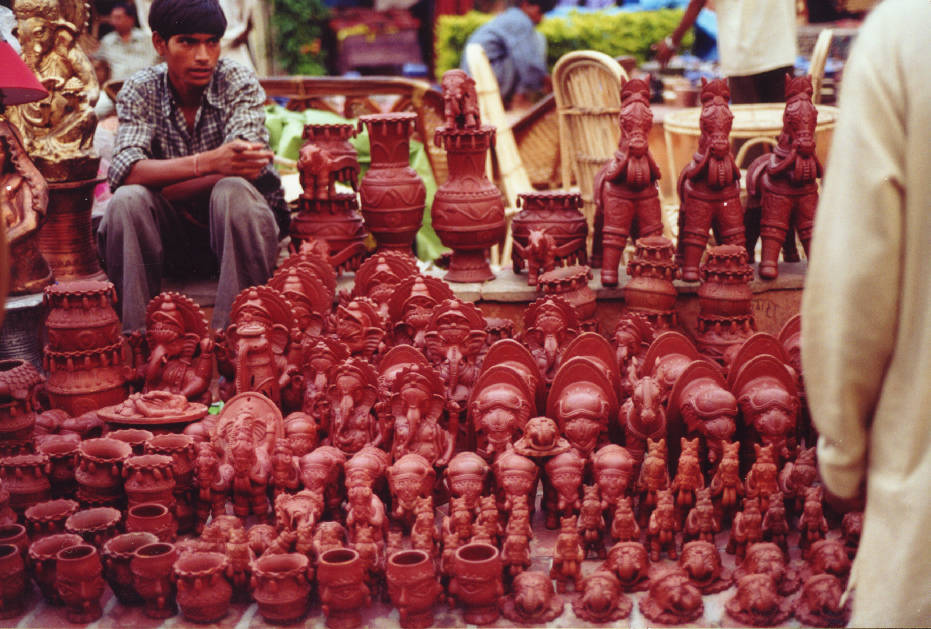
A pottery seller at Dilli Haat

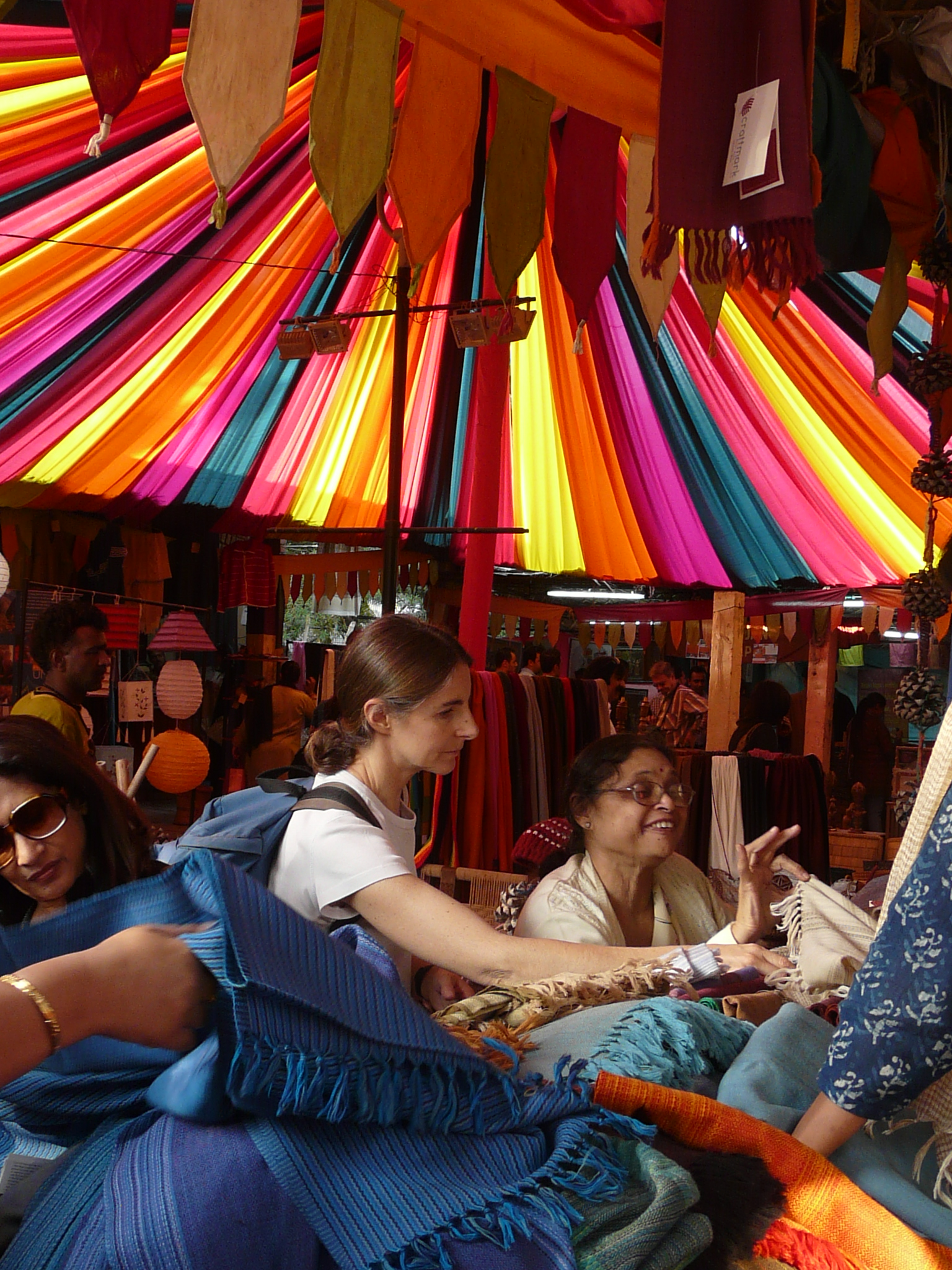
Buying and selling at Dilli Haat's Nature Bazaar

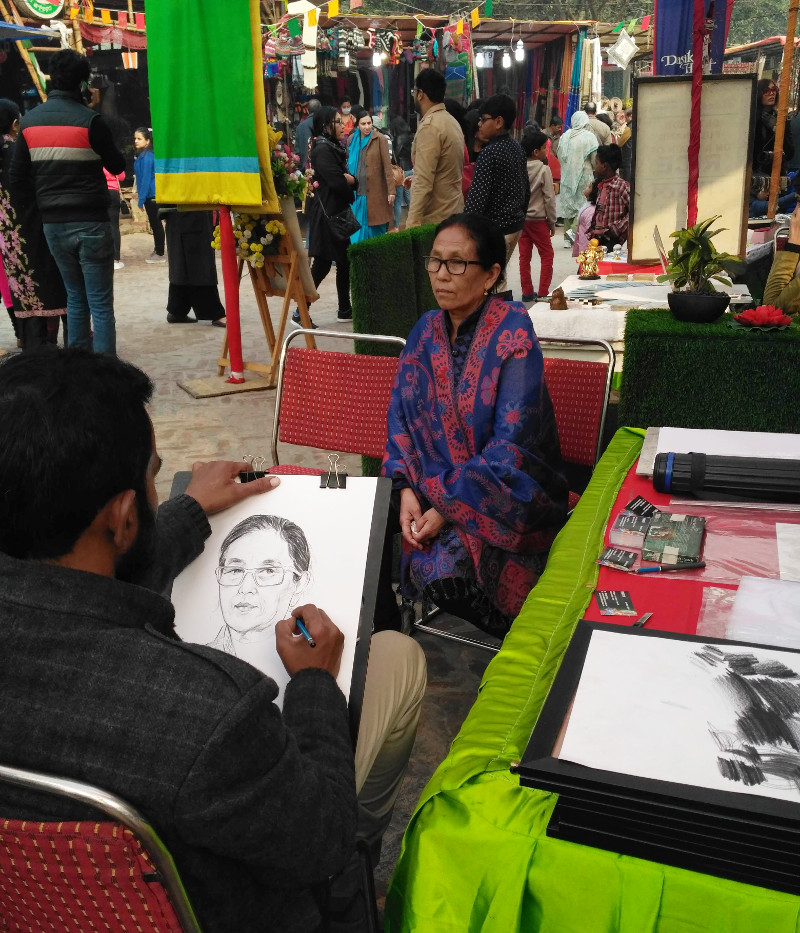
A street artist sketching a portrait at Dilli Haat

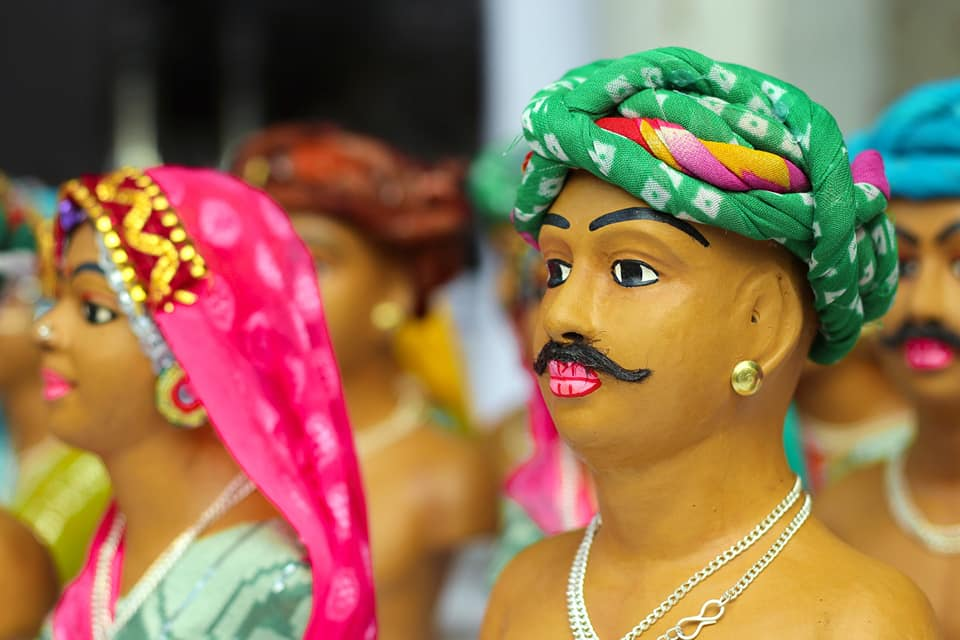
Clay sculpture at Delhi Haat

== History ==
Dilli Haat was established jointly by Delhi Tourism (DTTDC), Government of Delhi and NDMC, D.C. (Handicrafts) and D.C. (Handlooms), Ministry of Textiles and Ministry of Tourism, Govt. of India and opened in March 1994. Around 2003, this market became fully wheelchair-accessible, including an accessible bathroom. Delhi's second Dilli Haat, the Dilli Haat, Pitampura, also was developed by DTTDC in Pitampura, close to Pitampura TV Tower and spread over 7.2 hectares, was opened in April 2008. More Dilli Haats are set to be created in other parts of Delhi with the third having been opened in Janakpuri in August 2013.

Over the years, Dilli Haat became a venue of crafts, music, dance and cultural festivals, for example India's first comic convention, Comic Con India was organised at Dilli Haat, INA, in February 2011.

== Accessibility ==
Dilli Haat, INA Market is accessed through INA underground station of Delhi Metro, which opened in 2010; while Dilli Haat, Pitampura is serviced by Netaji Subhash Place Metro Station. Dilli Haat, Janakpuri is serviced by Janakpuri East metro station.

== Craftsmen ==
Only craftsmen registered with D.C. Handicrafts are eligible for places at the Dilli Haat. The stalls are allotted on a rotational basis to craftsmen who come from all corners of India at nominal payment for a period of 15 days.

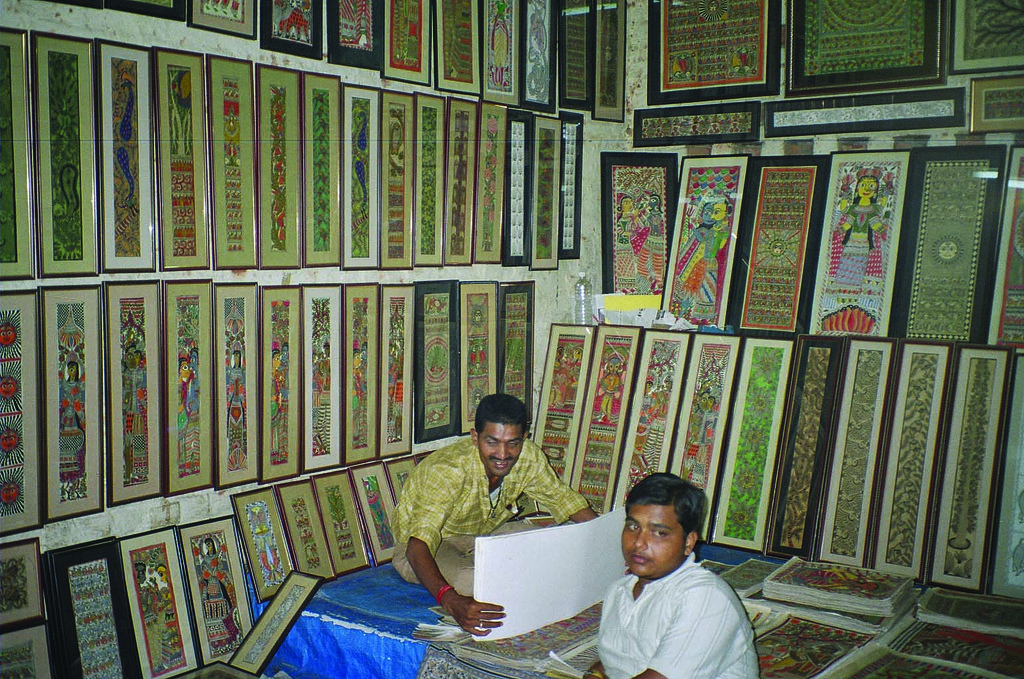
Framed Madhubani paintings in a shop at Dilli Haat

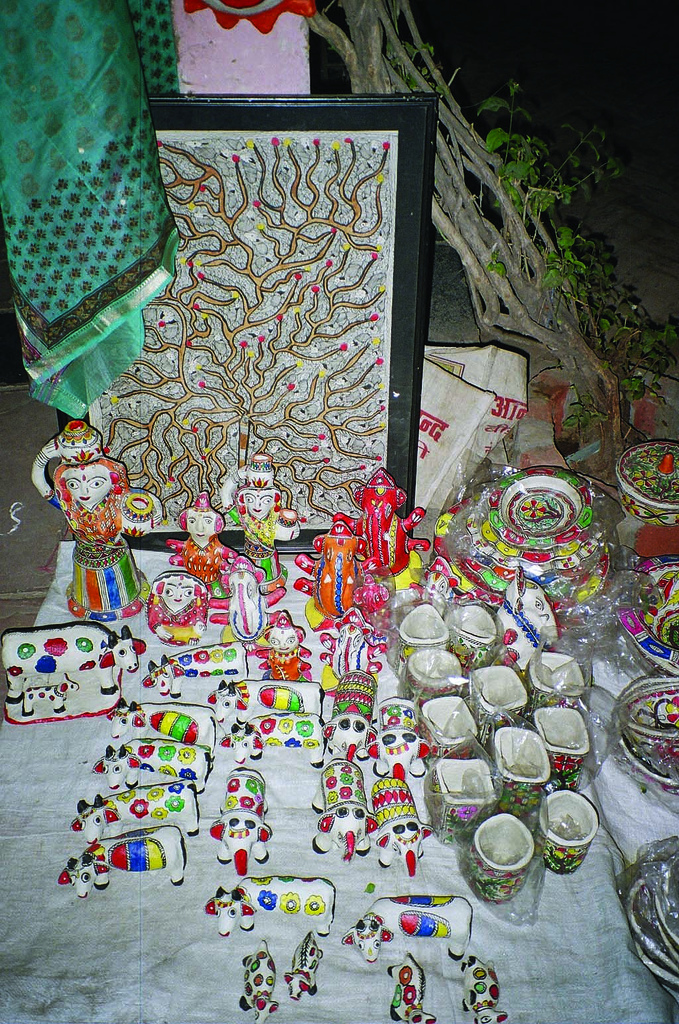
Tribal Papier Mache products at Dilli Haat

== See also ==
- Arabber
- Bazaar
- Bazaari
- Hawker centre (Asia) a centre where street food is sold
- Marketplace
- Pan Bazaar
- Peddler
- Retail
- Street vendor
- Street food
