= Qutub Festival =

Festival in Delhi

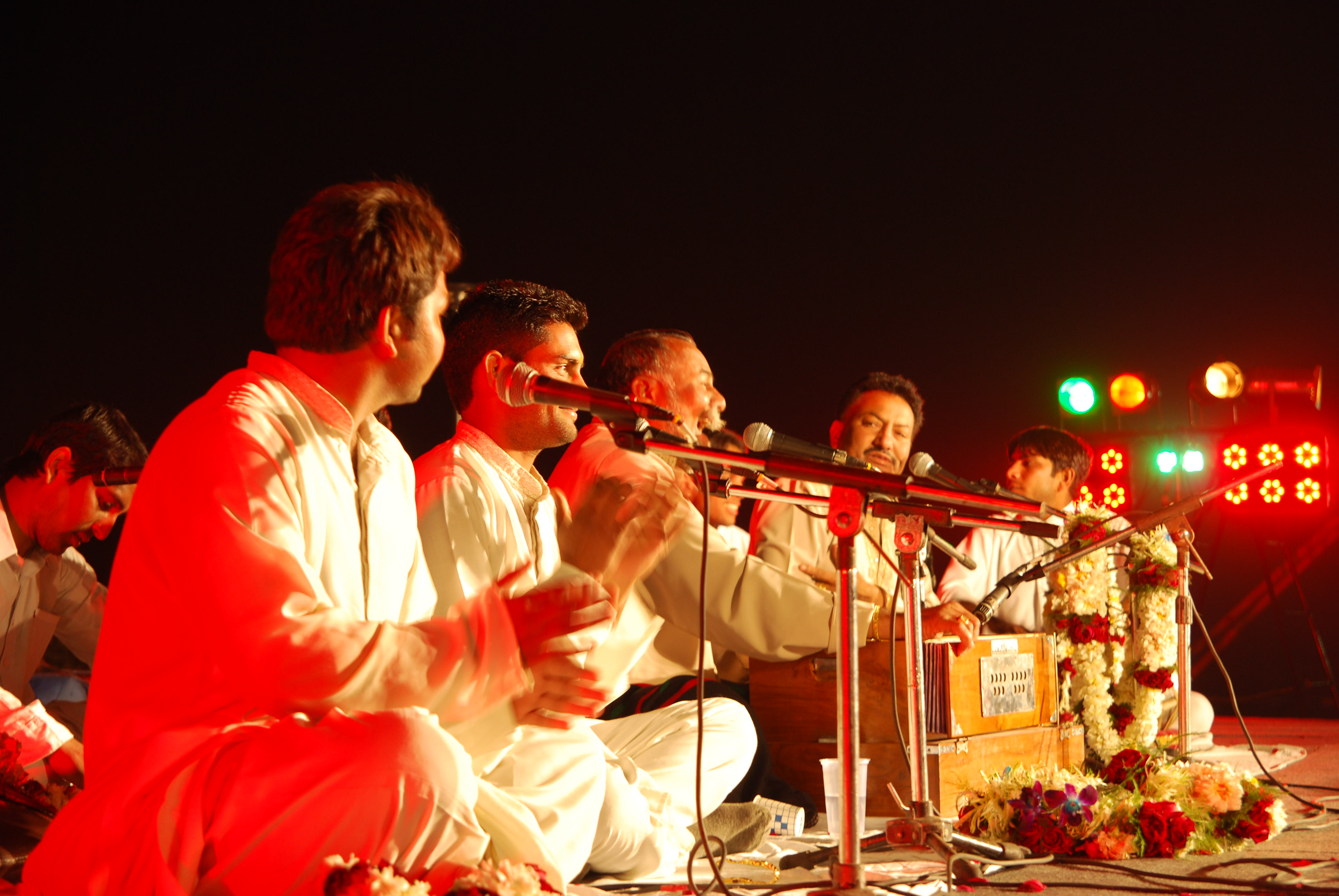
- Wadali brothers performing at Qutub Festival, Feb 2008
- Genre: Sufi music
- Dates: November/December
- Locations: Mehrauli, Delhi
- Patron: Delhi Tourism
- Website: http://www.delhi-tourism-india.com/festivals/qutub-festival.htm

Qutub Festival is a five-day festival usually held in November–December in the Qutub complex in the Indian metropolis of Delhi organized by Delhi Tourism, Govt. of Delhi.

The festival showcases the cultural art forms of the country but also puts this classic structure of Qutub Minar in the cynosure of national and international attention. This year's festival will be held from 15 to 19 November 2019. Several reputed singers performed in the festival so far.
