= Sangeeta Malhotra =

Astrophysicist

- Education: Delhi University (BA, Physics, 1988); Indian Institute of Technology, Kanpur (M.A., Physics, 1990); Princeton University(Ph.D., 1995)
- Occupation: Astrophysicist

Sangeeta Malhotra is an astrophysicist who studies galaxies, their contents, and their effects on the universe around them. The objects she studies range from our own Milky Way galaxy to some of the earliest and most distant known galaxies in the epoch of cosmic dawn.

Malhotra works at the NASA Goddard Space Flight Center, where she is part of the Nancy Grace Roman Space Telescope project. She was previously a tenured full professor at Arizona State University.

== Education ==
Malhotra received her bachelor's degree in physics from Delhi University in 1988, and her master's degree in physics from the Indian Institute of Technology - Kanpur in 1990. In 1995, she became the first woman of color to receive a PhD in Astrophysics from Princeton University. Her Ph.D. supervisor at Princeton was Professor Gillian Knapp. Malhotra's Ph.D. thesis examined the distribution of atomic and molecular gas in the Milky Way galaxy. Results from her thesis work are reproduced in the textbook "Galactic Structure", by Binney and Merrifield.

== Career ==
After completing her Ph.D., Malhotra first held a postdoctoral fellowship at the California Institute of Technology. She next won a NASA Hubble Fellowship, which she held at the National Optical Astronomy Observatory in Tucson and subsequently at the Johns Hopkins University in Baltimore, Maryland. She then joined the science staff at the Space Telescope Science Institute in Baltimore, where she worked from 2001 to 2005. She moved to a faculty position at Arizona State University in Tempe, Arizona in 2006, where she helped build up the new School of Earth and Space Exploration. She moved to NASA's Goddard Space Flight Center in early 2017 to take up a position working on development of the Nancy Grace Roman Space Telescope.

== Research ==
=== Infrared Properties of Galaxies ===
Malhotra and collaborators used Infrared Space Observatory data to study the far-infrared line emission from galaxies. In particular, she demonstrated that the 158 micron emission line of ionized carbon becomes a relatively less prominent spectral feature in galaxies with higher infrared luminosity and/or warmer interstellar dust.

=== Lyman Alpha Galaxies and Cosmological Reionization ===
Malhotra initiated the Large Area Lyman Alpha survey in the late 1990s. This was one of the first research projects to successfully identify galaxies in the early universe using their Lyman alpha emission lines, a method that had been first proposed in 1967 by Bruce Partridge and Jim Peebles. She has gone on to study galaxies with strong Lyman alpha lines in detail. In particular, she demonstrated that they tend to be young, with extreme star formation properties and (for galaxies) small sizes.

She also pioneered the technique of using Lyman alpha galaxies to study cosmological reionization, leading a 2004 paper that demonstrated that the gas between galaxies was already mostly ionized at redshift 6.5, when the universe was less than a billion years old. Recently, she, her former Ph.D. student V. S. Tilvi, and other collaborators identified the most distant galaxy group so far known (EGS77), and found evidence that these galaxies are ionizing their surroundings. She is the US principal investigator of the ongoing multinational LAGER project (Lyman Alpha Galaxies in the Epoch of Reionization), which is identifying hundreds of Lyman alpha galaxies in the epoch of cosmic dawn.

=== Slitless Spectroscopy from Space ===
Malhotra has led three Hubble Space Telescope treasury programs (GRAPES, PEARS, and FIGS) that have collectively advanced the application of slitless spectroscopic observations from space. While initially designed to identify galaxies in the distant universe, these projects have also proven invaluable for identifying galaxies at intermediate distances, studying the chemical compositions of those galaxies, and even studying stars in our own Galaxy. Further developments of these techniques form a core part of the planned observing programs for ESA's Euclid mission and NASA's Roman mission, and Malhotra is helping develop plans for the Roman application. She is the Principal Investigator of the approved Cycle 1 Roman observing program "GRACE: The Grism Reionization And Cosmic Evolution Survey".

=== Pea galaxies ===
Malhotra has directed multiple PhD students in studying Green Pea galaxies. She and her collaborators have demonstrated that these comparatively local objects bear striking similarities to Lyman alpha galaxies in the early universe, which is valuable because the pea galaxies are easier to study in detail than their more distant counterparts.

== Students ==
Malhotra has advised over a half dozen Ph.D. thesis students, including Steven Finkelstein, Nimish Hathi, Vithal Tilvi, Lifang Xia, Huan Yang, Tianxing Jiang, John Pharo, and Lucia Perez.

== Awards and honors ==
Malhotra was awarded a NASA Hubble Fellowship in 1998.
She is a Legacy Fellow of the American Astronomical Society.
