= University Grants Commission (India) =

Commission on standards of higher education streams in India

- Crest of the University Grants Commission; Motto: "Gyan-Vigyan Vimuktaye" (ज्ञान-विज्ञान विमुक्तये); Meaning: Knowledge Liberates.
- Abbreviation: UGC
- Formation: 28 December 1953; 72 years ago
- Founder: Maulana Azad
- Purpose: Coordinate, determine, and maintain standards of teaching, examination, and research in university education.
- Headquarters: New Delhi
- Location: India
- Official language: English (India), Hindi
- Owner: Government of India
- Chairman: Deepti Gaur Mukerjee (acting)
- Parent organization: Department of Higher Education, Ministry of Education, Government of India
- Budget: ₹4,693 crore (US$500 million) (2021–22)
- Website: ugc.gov.in

The University Grants Commission (UGC) is a statutory body under Department of Higher Education, Ministry of Education, Government of India. It was set up in accordance to the UGC Act 1956 and is charged with coordination, determination and maintenance of standards of higher education in India. It provides recognition to universities in India, and disbursements of funds to such recognized universities and colleges. The UGC headquarters are in New Delhi, and it has six regional centres in Pune, Bhopal, Kolkata, Hyderabad, Guwahati and Bengaluru. A proposal to replace it with another new regulatory body called HECI is under consideration by the Government of India. The UGC provides doctoral scholarships to all those who clear JRF in the National Eligibility Test. On an average, each year ₹725 crore (US$77 million) is spent on doctoral and post-doctoral fellowships by the commission.

== History ==
The UGC was first formed in 1945 to oversee the work of the three Central Universities of Aligarh, Banaras and Delhi. Its responsibility was extended in 1947 to cover all Indian universities.

In August 1949 a recommendation was made to reconstitute the UGC along similar lines to the University Grants Committee of the United Kingdom. This recommendation was made by the University Education Commission of 1948–1949 which was set up under the chairmanship of S. Radhakrishnan "to report on Indian university education and suggest improvements and extensions". In 1952 the government decided that all grants to universities and higher learning institutions should be handled by the UGC. Subsequently, an inauguration was held on 28 December 1953 by Maulana Abul Kalam Azad, the Minister of Education, Natural Resources and Scientific Research. The University Grants Commission (UGC) came into existence on 28 December 1953 and became a statutory Organization of the Government of India by an Act of Parliament in 1956, for the coordination, determination and maintenance of standards of teaching, examination and research in university education.

In November 1956, the UGC became a statutory body upon the passing of the "University Grants Commission Act, 1956" by the Indian Parliament.

In 1994 and 1995, the UGC decentralized its operations by setting up six regional centres at Pune, Hyderabad, Kolkata, Bhopal, Guwahati and Bangalore. The head office of the UGC is located at Bahadur Shah Zafar Marg in New Delhi, with two additional bureaus operating from 35, Feroze Shah Road and the South Campus of University of Delhi as well.

In December 2015, the government of India set a National Institutional of Ranking Framework under UGC which will rank all educational institutes by April 2016.

In February 2022, M. Jagadesh Kumar, a professor in the Department of Electrical Engineering at IIT Delhi and former VC of JNU, was appointed as the chairman of the UGC.

== Types of universities ==
The types of universities regulated by the UGC include:

- Central universities are established by an Act of Parliament and are under the purview of the Department of Higher Education in the Ministry of Education. As of 1 June 2026, the list of central universities published by the UGC includes 57 central universities.
- State universities are run by the state government of each of the states and territories of India and are usually established by a local legislative assembly act. As of 1 June 2026, the UGC lists 521 state universities. The oldest establishment date listed by the UGC is 1857, shared by the University of Mumbai, the University of Madras and the University of Calcutta. Most State Universities are affiliating universities in that they administer many affiliated colleges (many located in very small towns) that typically offer a range of undergraduate courses, but may also offer post-graduate courses. More established colleges may even offer PhD programs in some departments with the approval of the affiliating university.
- "Deemed to be University", previously also referred to as Deemed university, is a status of autonomy granted by the Department of Higher Education on the advice of the UGC, under Section 3 of the UGC Act. As of 1 June 2026, the UGC lists 155 Institutions as Deemed to be Universities of which 67 are included under Section 12(B) of the UGC Act, 1956, making them eligible to receive grants from the government.
- State Private universities are approved by the UGC. They are regulated under the UGC (Establishment and Maintenance of Standards in Private Universities) Regulations, 2003. Per these regulations, state private universities are established by an Act of a State Legislative Assembly and listed by the UGC in the Gazette upon receiving the Act. The UGC sends committees to inspect the state private university and publishes their inspection report. As of 1 June 2026, the UGC list 557 state private universities with 35 of these approved to receive government grants under Section 12 (B).
- An autonomous college in India is an institution that operates independently in academic matters while still being affiliated with a university. It has the freedom to design its curriculum, conduct exams, and set its evaluation system, but the degree is awarded by the affiliated university.
- A college, also called an affiliated college is an institution that functions under the academic and administrative control of a university. It follows the rules, syllabus, examination system, and evaluation process set by the affiliated university.

As of 25 August 2022, the University Grants Commission (UGC) has also released the list of 21 fake universities operating in India. UGC has said that these 21 self-styled, unrecognized institutions functioning in contravention of the UGC Act have been declared as fake and are not entitled to confer any degree.

The UGC has also issued warning to Deemed to be Universities to not use the word University as per their recent changes and guidelines.

== Professional councils ==
UGC, along with CSIR currently conducts NET for appointments of teachers in colleges and universities. It has made NET qualification mandatory for teaching at graduation level and at post-graduation level since July 2009. However, those with PhD are given five percent relaxation.

Accreditation for higher learning over universities under the aegis of University Grants Commission is overseen by following fifteen autonomous statutory institutions:

- All India Council for Technical Education (AICTE)
- Indian Council of Agricultural Research (ICAR)
- Bar Council of India (BCI)
- National Council for Teacher Education (NCTE)
- Rehabilitation Council of India (RCI)
- National Medical Commission (NMC)
- Pharmacy Council of India (PCI)
- Indian Nursing Council (INC)
- National Dental Commission (NDC)
- National Commission for Homoeopathy (NCH)
- National Commission for Indian System of Medicine (NCISM)
- National Council for Rural Institutes (NCRI)
- Council of Architecture
- Various State Councils of Higher Education (SCHE)

== Agencies ==
- Inter-University Accelerator Centre (IUAC), New Delhi: Focuses on accelerator-based research.
- Inter-University Centre for Astronomy and Astrophysics (IUCAA), Pune: Promotes research in physics and astronomy.
- Information and Library Network Centre (INFLIBNET), Ahmedabad: Manages academic databases and e-resources.
- UGC-DAE Consortium for Scientific Research (UGC-DAE CSR), Indore: Facilitates research at DAE facilities.
- Consortium for Educational Communication (CEC), New Delhi: Focuses on e-learning and media.
- Inter-University Centre for Teacher Education (IUCTE), Varanasi: Focuses on improving teacher education quality.
- Inter-University Centre for Yogic Sciences (IUC-YS), Bengaluru: Promotes scientific study of yoga.

== Future ==
In 2009, the Union Minister of Human Resource Development, Kapil Sibal made known the government of India's plans to consider the closing down of the UGC and the related body All India Council for Technical Education (AICTE), in favour of a higher regulatory body with more sweeping powers. This goal, proposed by the Higher Education and Research (HE&R) Bill, 2011, intends to replace the UGC with a National Commission for Higher Education & Research (NCHER) "for determination, coordination, maintenance and continued enhancement of standards of higher education and research". The bill proposes absorbing the UGC and other academic agencies into this new organisation. Those agencies involved in medicine and law would be exempt from this merger "to set minimum standards for medical and legal education leading to professional practice". The bill has received opposition from the local governments of the Indian states of Bihar, Kerala, Punjab, Tamil Nadu and West Bengal, but has received general support.

On 27 June 2018, the Ministry of Human Resource Development announced its plans to repeal the UGC Act, 1956. A bill was expected to be introduced in the 2018 monsoon session of the Parliament, which if passed would have led to the dissolution of the UGC. The bill also stipulated formation of a new body, the Higher Education Commission of India (HECI). This form of the bill was ultimately dropped in the face of strong political opposition, and was reworked in 2019 in order to gain political consensus. As of mid-2020 the UGC continues to remain in existence. Ministry of Human Resource Development, MHRD, was renamed as 'Ministry of Education'.

On 13 April 2022 the University Grants Commission of India (UGC India) announced to allow the students to complete two academic programmes simultaneously keeping in view the proposals outlined in the National Education Policy – NEP 2020 which emphasizes the need to enable multiple pathways to learning involving both formal and non-formal education modes.

In a joint notification with All India Council for Technical Education (AICTE), University Grants Commission advised Indian nationals and overseas citizens of India against pursuing higher education in Pakistan stating that any such student with a degree from an educational institution in Pakistan "shall not be eligible for seeking employment or higher studies in India". The notification also stated that this will not be applicable to migrants who have been granted Indian citizenship and have obtained security clearance from MHA.

== See also ==
- List of autonomous higher education institutes in India
- List of universities in India
- University Grants Commission Consortium for Academic and Research Ethics
