= Meera Khanna =

Indian writer and gender rights activist

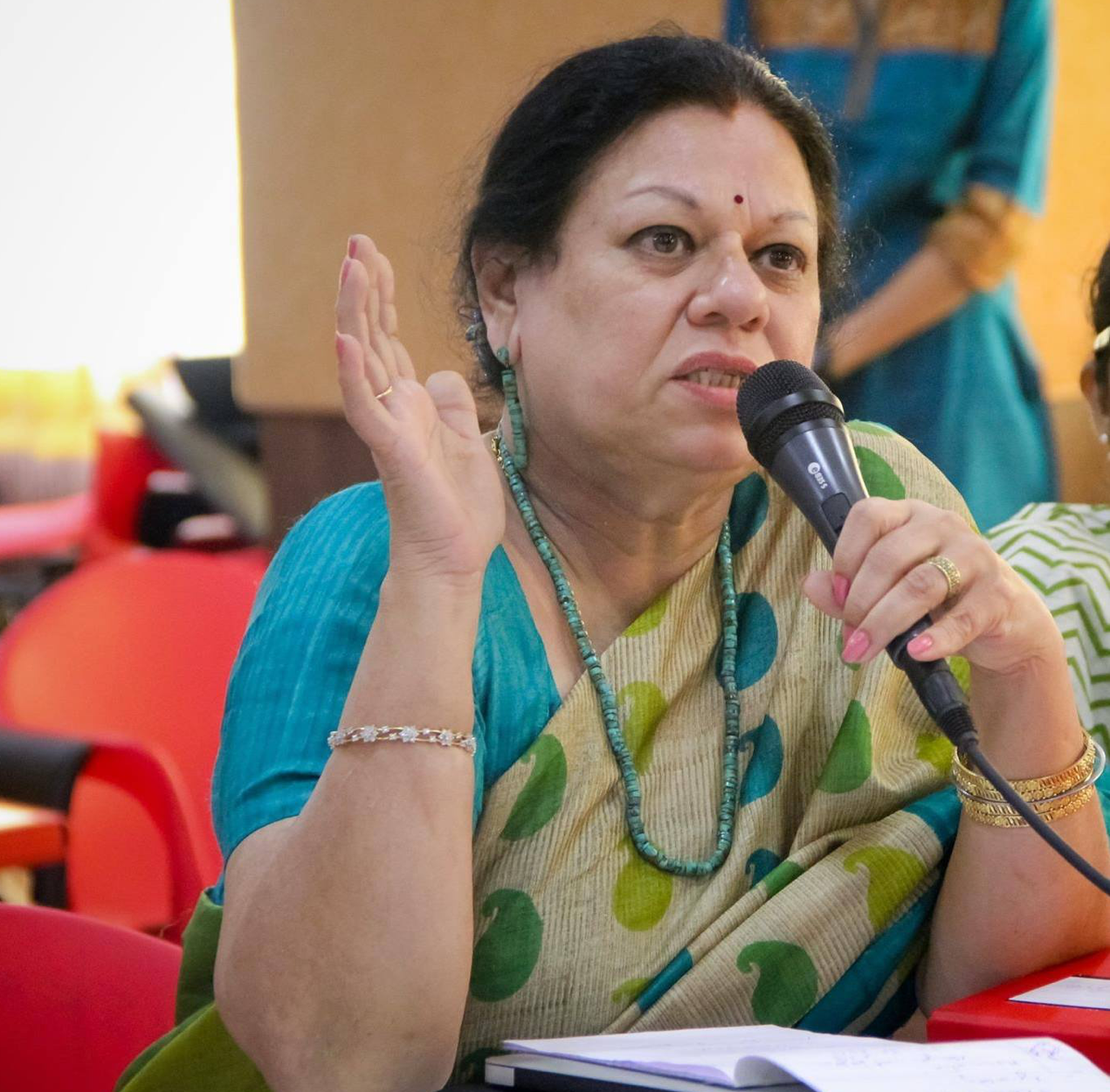
- Education: Delhi University (MA)
- Occupations: Writer, poet, gender rights activist

Meera Khanna is an Indian writer, poet, and gender rights activist. She is the trustee and Executive Vice President of the Guild for Service, which was founded by V. Mohini Giri. She spearheaded a global alliance called "The Last Woman First". Khanna is also co-founder and South Asia chapter chair of Every Woman Coalition.

== Education ==
Khanna completed her schooling at Pune and Firozpur, India. She obtained graduate honors and master’s degrees in English Literature from Delhi University.

== Career ==
Khanna works in the development sector and focuses on women’s empowerment and capacity building, especially in rural India. She is the trustee and Executive Vice President of the Guild of Service. Under her leadership, the Guild of Service has established and run shelter homes and capacity-building, family counselling, and production centers, as well as schools for children from marginalized communities. The Guild of Service also currently runs homes for destitute women in Vrindavan, Godhra, Nagapattinam, and Srinagar. Khanna also helped establish and run homes for militancy-affected women and children in Srinagar, and Baramulla, Kashmir.

Khanna lead a global alliance called "The Last Woman First". She is the co-founder of Every Woman Coalition, and Director of the South Asian Network for Widows’ Empowerment in Development. She is a trustee of Navdanya, an advisor at the War Widows Association, and a member of the Civil Society Advisory Group under UN Women, India. She has served as a consultant to the Government of India’s High Level Committee on the Status of Women, and was a member of two Expert Committees on Widows, constituted by the National Commission for Women and the Supreme Court of India.

Khanna was also the Founder-Trustee of Women's Initiative for Peace in South Asia, through which she led a Women's Delegation to Pakistan and coordinated the South Asian Women Writers and a Creative Workshop that involved an exhibition by South Asian women photographers, as well as South Asian theater festival, Imaging Peace.

Khanna also drafted the Resolution on Widows for UN Action, which was presented to the first Under Secretary General and Executive Director of UN Women, Michelle Bachelet. That resolution was supported by more than 80 organizations across the world. Khanna was a speaker at the UN Human Rights Council 42nd session (09/20/2019) as part of the Widows in Crisis and Conflict Panel. Khanna also co-edited "Mantras for Positive Ageing" with Dr V Mohini Giri. The book carries a foreword by the Dalai Lama.

== Books ==
- If there be a Paradise (Gulshan Publications, 2012)
- Living Death: The Trauma of Widowhood in India (Gyan Publishing House, 2012)
- In a state of violent peace (Harper Collins, 2015)
- Breaking Paths (Niyogi Books, 2019)
- Mantras for Positive Ageing (co-editor, Pippa Rann Books and Media, 2021)

== Awards and recognition ==
Amity University, Noida awarded Khanna the Women Achievers Award in 2018. The Women’s Federation for World Peace recognized Khanna with the 2019 Fostering Peace Within the Individual award. Khanna was also featured in UN Women India's Mujhe Haq Hai campaign, which aimed to inspire women to defy norms by rising above challenges.
