= Inter-University Accelerator Centre =

Indian accelerator-based research centre in New Delhi

Coordinates: 28.5270°N 77.1679°E

- Former name: Nuclear Science Centre (1984–2005)
- Established: 1984
- Field of research: Nuclear physics, materials science, atomic physics, radiation biology, accelerator mass spectrometry
- Director: Avinash Chandra Pandey
- Location: Aruna Asaf Ali Marg, New Delhi 110067, New Delhi, India
- Operating agency: University Grants Commission
- Website: www.iuac.res.in

The Inter-University Accelerator Centre (IUAC), known until 2005 as the Nuclear Science Centre (NSC), is an autonomous research institute in New Delhi, India, that operates particle accelerators and associated experimental facilities as a national user facility for researchers from Indian universities, colleges and research institutions. It was the first Inter-University Centre set up by the University Grants Commission (UGC), and is funded by the UGC.

The centre's main accelerator is a 15 UD Pelletron tandem electrostatic accelerator, which has delivered ion beams to users since 1991 and is supplemented by a superconducting linear accelerator booster, several smaller accelerators, and a compact free-electron laser producing terahertz radiation. It also hosts a PARAM Rudra supercomputer under India's National Supercomputing Mission.

== History ==
The UGC conceived the Inter-University Centre model in the early 1980s to give university researchers access to expensive research infrastructure that individual universities could not afford. The proposal for an accelerator-based centre was approved by Prime Minister Indira Gandhi in 1984, and the institute was set up that year as the Nuclear Science Centre, the first of the UGC's Inter-University Centres.

The centre was built as a greenfield project on about 25 acres of land provided by Jawaharlal Nehru University, in the institutional area near the Qutub in south Delhi. Construction began in December 1986. The centre was registered as a society under the Societies Registration Act, 1860 on 30 September 1988 and became autonomous on 19 December 1988.

The Pelletron accelerator was commissioned and dedicated to the nation by the Minister of Human Resource Development on 19 December 1990, and the first user experiment was carried out on 8 July 1991, from which date the centre has functioned as a national user facility.

Through the 1990s and 2000s the centre added beamlines and detector systems for nuclear physics, materials science and radiation biology, and developed a superconducting linear accelerator (LINAC) to boost the energy of beams from the Pelletron. Its first LINAC module was commissioned in September 2004. In June 2005 the Nuclear Science Centre was renamed the Inter-University Accelerator Centre, reflecting its role as a multidisciplinary accelerator facility rather than a nuclear physics laboratory alone.

=== Timeline ===
Date	Event
1984	Concept of an Inter-University Centre approved; Nuclear Science Centre established
December 1986	Construction begins
30 September 1988	Registered under the Societies Registration Act, 1860
19 December 1988	Centre becomes autonomous
19 December 1990	Pelletron accelerator commissioned
8 July 1991	First user experiment
1991	Gamma Detector Array and Heavy Ion Reaction Analyser become operational
1993	Materials science beamline commissioned
1994	Radiation biology beamline commissioned
1997	Cryogenic plant operational
2001–2002	Superbuncher and superconducting resonator fabrication facility commissioned
September 2004	First superconducting LINAC module commissioned
January 2005	High-temperature superconducting ECR ion source commissioned
June 2005	Renamed Inter-University Accelerator Centre
December 2005	National Array of Neutron Detectors (NAND) commissioned
February 2008	Indian National Gamma Array (INGA) commissioned at the centre
December 2008	First phase of the Hybrid Recoil mass Analyzer (HYRA) commissioned
April 2023	Cryostat for the IUAC-designed 1.5 T MRI magnet completed
26 September 2024	PARAM Rudra supercomputer dedicated to the nation

== Accelerators ==
=== 15 UD Pelletron ===
The centre's principal machine is a 15 UD Pelletron, a vertical tandem electrostatic accelerator capable of terminal voltages of about 15 MV. It accelerates beams of ions ranging from protons to heavy ions to energies of tens to hundreds of MeV, and has been in near-continuous operation as a user facility since 1991.

=== Superconducting LINAC ===
To reach higher beam energies, the centre designed and built a superconducting linear accelerator that boosts ions from the Pelletron. It uses niobium quarter-wave resonators, a number of which were fabricated in-house at the centre's resonator fabrication facility, and is cooled by liquid helium from an on-site cryogenic plant.

=== Other accelerators and ion sources ===
- A 1.7 MV Pelletron used mainly for ion beam analysis techniques such as Rutherford backscattering spectrometry.
- A Low Energy Ion Beam Facility (LEIB), based on a high-temperature superconducting electron cyclotron resonance ion source, providing low-energy, highly charged ion beams for materials and atomic physics research.
- A dedicated accelerator mass spectrometry (AMS) system based on a 500 kV Pelletron, used for measuring long-lived radionuclides such as beryllium-10 and aluminium-26 in geological and environmental samples.

=== Delhi Light Source ===
The Delhi Light Source (DLS) is a compact, pre-bunched free-electron laser facility built at the centre with support from the Board of Research in Nuclear Sciences. A photocathode radio-frequency electron gun driven by a fibre laser produces short electron bunches of a few MeV, which pass through an undulator to generate tunable terahertz radiation in roughly the 0.18–3 THz range. Later phases of the project envisage a superconducting electron gun and accelerating structures to raise the electron energy to about 40 MeV, for infrared radiation and X-ray production by inverse Compton scattering. The design and development involved collaboration with KEK in Japan and with Helmholtz-Zentrum Berlin and DESY in Germany.

== Experimental facilities ==
Beams from the accelerators are delivered to experimental stations in two beam halls. Major facilities include:

- Heavy Ion Reaction Analyser (HIRA), a recoil mass spectrometer for studying nuclear reaction products.
- Hybrid Recoil mass Analyzer (HYRA), a gas-filled and vacuum-mode separator for studies of heavy and superheavy nuclei and reactions near the Coulomb barrier.
- Indian National Gamma Array (INGA), a national array of Compton-suppressed clover germanium detectors for gamma spectroscopy, which is periodically moved between Indian accelerator laboratories.
- National Array of Neutron Detectors (NAND), used for neutron measurements in fusion–fission studies.
- General Purpose Scattering Chamber and other set-ups for reaction studies.
- Materials science beamlines for swift heavy ion irradiation and ion implantation, with facilities for in-situ characterisation.
- A radiation biology beamline for studying the effects of heavy-ion irradiation on biological systems.
- Atomic physics set-ups for ion–atom collision studies.

== High-performance computing ==
In September 2024 the centre became one of three host sites for the PARAM Rudra supercomputers, built in India by the Centre for Development of Advanced Computing under the National Supercomputing Mission and dedicated to the nation by Prime Minister Narendra Modi on 26 September 2024. The other two systems were installed at the Giant Metrewave Radio Telescope in Pune and the S. N. Bose National Centre for Basic Sciences in Kolkata, and the three machines together cost about ₹130 crore (US$14 million).

The IUAC system, with a capacity of about 3 petaflops, is the most powerful of the three. It is intended mainly for computational research in materials science and atomic physics, complementing the centre's experimental facilities, and, like other National Supercomputing Mission systems, is available to researchers from academic institutions across India who apply for accounts through the mission's user portal.

== Research ==
Research at the centre is conducted both by visiting users from universities and institutes and by the centre's own scientists, who have the dual role of operating the facilities for users and pursuing their own research. Main research areas include:

- Nuclear physics, particularly nuclear structure and heavy-ion reaction dynamics such as fusion, fission and quasi-fission near the Coulomb barrier
- Materials science, including the modification of materials by swift heavy ions and the synthesis of nanostructures
- Atomic physics
- Radiation biology
- Accelerator mass spectrometry applied to earth, environmental and archaeological sciences

The centre's facilities have been used by several hundred researchers from about 70 universities, dozens of colleges and numerous national laboratories in India, as well as by researchers from abroad.

== Technology development and industry collaboration ==
Alongside its user facilities, the centre has developed expertise in superconducting magnets, cryogenics and related accelerator technologies, which it has applied outside basic research. As part of India's contribution to the PIP-II upgrade of the Fermilab accelerator complex in the United States, the centre and the Bhabha Atomic Research Centre supplied two single-spoke superconducting resonator cavities for testing at Fermilab.

=== Indigenous MRI magnet ===
The centre is a partner in the Ministry of Electronics and Information Technology's Indigenous Magnetic Resonance Imaging (IMRI) national mission, led by the Society for Applied Microwave Electronics Engineering & Research (SAMEER), Mumbai, alongside two centres of the Centre for Development of Advanced Computing and other partners, to design and build India's first domestically developed 1.5 tesla magnetic resonance imaging (MRI) scanner. Within the mission, IUAC was responsible for the scanner's core component: an actively shielded, whole-body 1.5 T superconducting magnet with a zero-boil-off liquid-helium cryostat, technology that had previously been held by only a few foreign manufacturers.

The cryostat, designed at IUAC, was fabricated by the industrial firm INOXCVA and completed in April 2023. The magnet system was named I-Amrit 1.5 (Indian Advanced MRI Technology 1.5), and the project partners described India as the sixth country able to manufacture MRI magnet systems. The first prototype scanner, which SAMEER agreed in March 2025 to install at the All India Institute of Medical Sciences, New Delhi for clinical trials, was integrated with a procured magnet while the indigenous magnet was being completed.

To take the technology to commercial production, IUAC worked with Paras Defence and Space Technologies, which co-developed the MRI magnet in consultation with the centre and planned to manufacture it at its Ambernath facility. In November 2025 the two signed a memorandum of understanding to jointly develop a commercial-grade superconducting MRI magnet system for manufacture in India.

== Academics and training ==
Although it does not award degrees itself, the centre supports doctoral research for students registered at Indian universities, who carry out experimental work at the centre and return to their home institutions. It runs a training programme for new research students and scientist trainees that is open to university research scholars, and a summer programme in experimental and accelerator physics for physics students, in which each participant completes a short project under a mentor.

== Governance ==
The centre is a registered society funded by the UGC. Its Governing Council is chaired by the Chairman of the UGC, and its other statutory bodies include a Governing Board, a Finance Committee and an Accelerator Users Committee drawn from the national research community. The Director of the centre is its chief executive and serves as member secretary of the Governing Council.

== See also ==
- University Grants Commission (India)
- Pelletron
- Variable Energy Cyclotron Centre
- Tata Institute of Fundamental Research
- List of particle accelerators
