= Archana Bhattacharyya =

Indian physicist (born 1948)

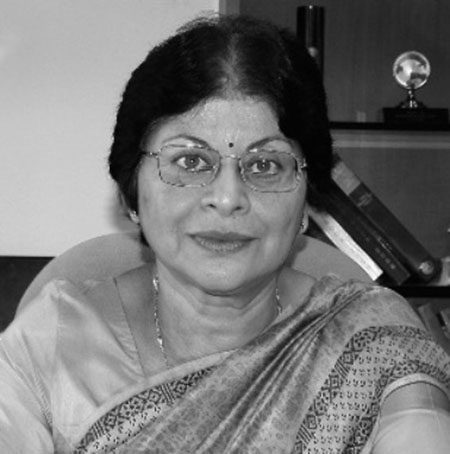
- Born: 1948 (age 77–78)
- Education: University of Delhi
- Known for: Ionospheric Physics and Geomagnetism
- Scientific career
- Workplaces: Indian Institute of Geomagnetism

Archana Bhattacharyya (born 1948) is an Indian physicist. She specializes in the field of ionospheric physics, geomagnetism, and space weather and is Director of the Indian Institute of Geomagnetism, Navi Mumbai.

== Education ==
Bhattacharyya completed B.Sc. (Hons) and M.Sc. in physics from the University of Delhi in 1967 and 1969, respectively. She also held a National Science Talent Scholarship (1964–69). She received PhD degree in physics from Northwestern University (1975), working in the area of theoretical condensed matter physics.

== Career ==
Bhattacharyya joined the Indian Institute of Geomagnetism (IIG), Mumbai in 1978. She worked with the group of KC Yeh at the University of Illinois, Urbana-Champaign during 1986-87 and during 1998–2000 she was a Senior NRC Resident Research Associate at the Air Force Research Laboratory in Massachusetts, USA. She was the Director of IIG during 2005–2010. Currently, she is an Emeritus Scientist at IIG.

== Awards and honours ==
- The Professor KR Ramanathan Memorial Lecture and Medal by the Indian Geophysical Union in 2008
- Dr. KS Krishnan Gold Medal by the University of Delhi in 1969
- Fellow of the Indian Academy of Sciences and National Academy of Sciences, India.

== Research interests ==
- Plasma instabilities in the equatorial ionosphere
- Probing the ionosphere with radio waves
- Effects of space weather on the ionosphere
- Spatio-temporal variations of the geomagnetic field
