= Ajmal Khan Park =

Park in Karol Bagh, India

Coordinates: 28.653636°N 77.196604°E

- Interactive map of Ajmal Khan Park
- Type: Urban park
- Location: Karol Bagh, Delhi, India
- Area: 5 acres (2.0 ha)
- Created: 1921
- Operator: MCD

Ajmal Khan Park is an urban park in the central part of the Karol Bagh of Delhi, India. Spread over five acres, it was initially opened in 1921, named Hakim Ajmal Khan (1868–1927), noted freedom fighter and Unani medicine physician. It is adjacent to Tibbia College built by Hakim Ajmal Khan.

The park has a statue of Ajmal Khan at the centre of the park, besides a musical fountain run by Delhi Tourism and Transportation Development Corporation. It has been a popular venue to numerous political rallies, holding a crowd of over 20,000 people.
