= Karan Oberoi (model) =

Indian fitness and fashion model

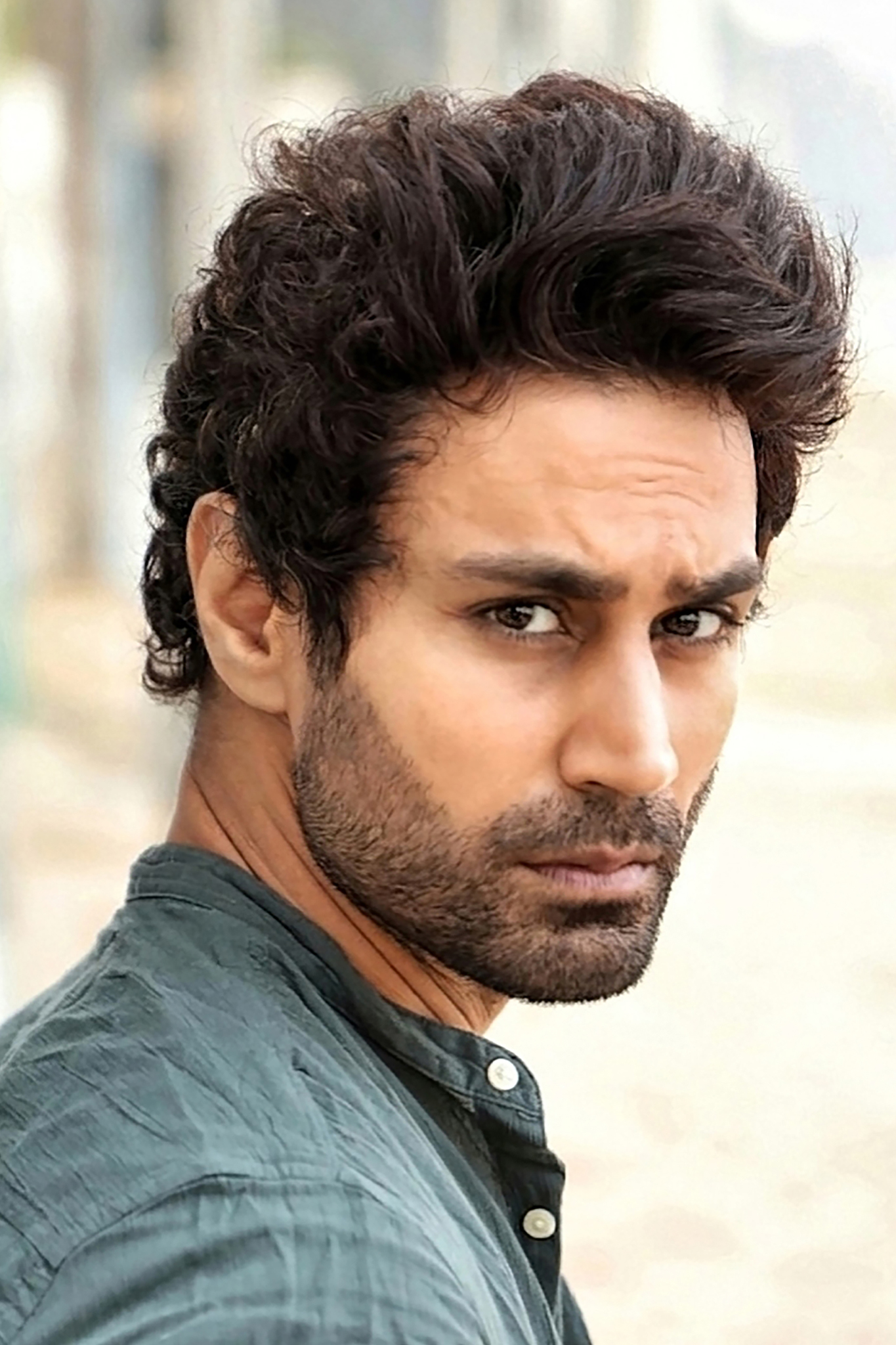
- Karan Oberoi in 2026
- Born: 26 September 1987 (age 38); New Delhi, India
- Other name: KO
- Education: Delhi University
- Occupations: Fashion model, Actor, Fitness model
- Years active: 2011–present
- Height: 6 ft (183 cm)
- Website: Official website

Karan Oberoi (born 26 September 1987) also known by his initials KO, is an Indian fashion model, actor and fitness model. Karan started out as a graphic designer at an advertising agency, but his career took a turn when he was offered a chance to model for a brand. Since then, he has appeared in advertising campaigns for brands like Reebok, Royal Enfield and Isuzu and walked the runway for fashion designers such as Rohit Bal, Shantanu & Nikhil and Rajesh Pratap Singh. He is also seen on the cover of magazines such as Men's Health and Health & Nutrition.

== Early life and education ==
Karan Oberoi was born and brought up in a Sikh family in New Delhi. His mother, Jasvinder Oberoi, is an associate professor of Hindi literature in one of the colleges in Delhi University and his father, G.S. Oberoi worked in a public sector bank. He has a sister, Ishween Sahiba.

He earned a Bachelor of Commerce (Honours) degree from Sri Guru Gobind Singh College of Commerce and a post graduate diploma in Mass Media from Delhi University. He then earned an MBA in International Business from Amity International Business School, Noida.

== Work ==
During his MBA, Oberoi entered Mr. India International in 2009 at the encouragement of his college friends and won the "Best Body" award, also finishing among the top five finalists. At the time, while still studying in college, he was not certain about pursuing modelling as a career. After completing his MBA, he began working at an advertising agency based in Delhi as a graphic designer. While working there, he received an offer for a modelling assignment that paid more than his monthly salary. He subsequently decided to leave his advertising job and pursue modelling as a full-time career. He has also learnt acting from Anupam Kher's Acting School, Actor Prepares.

As a fashion model Oberoi has walked for fashion designers such as Rohit Bal, Shantanu and Nikhil, Rajesh Pratap Singh, Arjun Khanna, Karan Johar and Varun Bahl and for brands like Aldo Group, Jack & Jones and Lamborghini. He is also seen walking for designers in fashion weeks Lakme Fashion Week, Wills Fashion Week, Beach Resort Fashion Week, GQ Fashion Nights and India Couture Week. He has worked with fashion photographers such as Dabboo Ratnani. Karan has appeared in fashion editorials for magazines and newspapers such as Hindustan Times, modeling collections for designers including Shivan & Narresh and others. As a model, he has also spoken about men's fashion and wardrobe styling in Hindustan Times articles.

He has been the poster boy of FBB brand for two consecutive years, and featured in the "Made Like a Gun" campaign for Royal Enfield motorcycles & Riding Apparel, Reebok India and Japanese Automobile brand Isuzu. He has appeared on the cover for Health & Nutrition and Men's Health. He was the official brand ambassador for British Nutrition.

In September 2019, Karan was invited as a celebrity guest on Times Food's cooking show, Cooking with Celebs. Oberoi has judged fashion shows at institutions such as IIT Guwahati.

== Awards and recognition ==
Oberoi was awarded as 'Top Fitness Model' by HT Brunch in early 2018. He won the title of 'Best Body' at Mr. India International. At the Global Leadership Awards held in April 2018, he won the 'Youth Icon Model of the Year'. He was labelled as "Hottie of the fortnight" by Filmfare magazine. In March 2018, he was featured in the list of 'India's top supermodels' by Hindustan Times. He was appointed as the 'World Peace Messenger' in June 2018 by the World Peace and Diplomacy Organization, a part of United Nations Global Compact in June 2018.
