= Delhi Tourism and Transportation Development Corporation =

Public sector undertaking

- Official logo of Delhi Tourism

Public Sector Undertaking overview
- Formed: 1975
- Type: Tourism, Package tour
- Jurisdiction: New Delhi, India
- Headquarters: Delhi, India
- Motto: Dildaar Dilli
- Parent department: Department of Tourism, Government of Delhi
- Website: www.delhitourism.gov.in

Delhi Tourism and Transportation Development Corporation (DTTDC) is an undertaking of the Government of Delhi, in the National Capital Region, India, that was established in December 1975 for the purpose of promoting tourism and related services in the city of Delhi. It has an authorised share capital of Rs. 10.00 crores and a paid up capital of Rs. 6.28 crores. It is involved in several other activities, some of which do not fall under the core activity of promotion of tourism, such as the selling of liquor. This particular activity, however, provides the corporation with revenue that can be utilised in tourism or other related development activities for the National Capital Region of Delhi.

== Main activities ==
The main activities of Delhi Tourism can be divided into the following categories:

=== Publicity literature ===
The corporation published literature for publicity and promotion of tourism including maps and brochures.

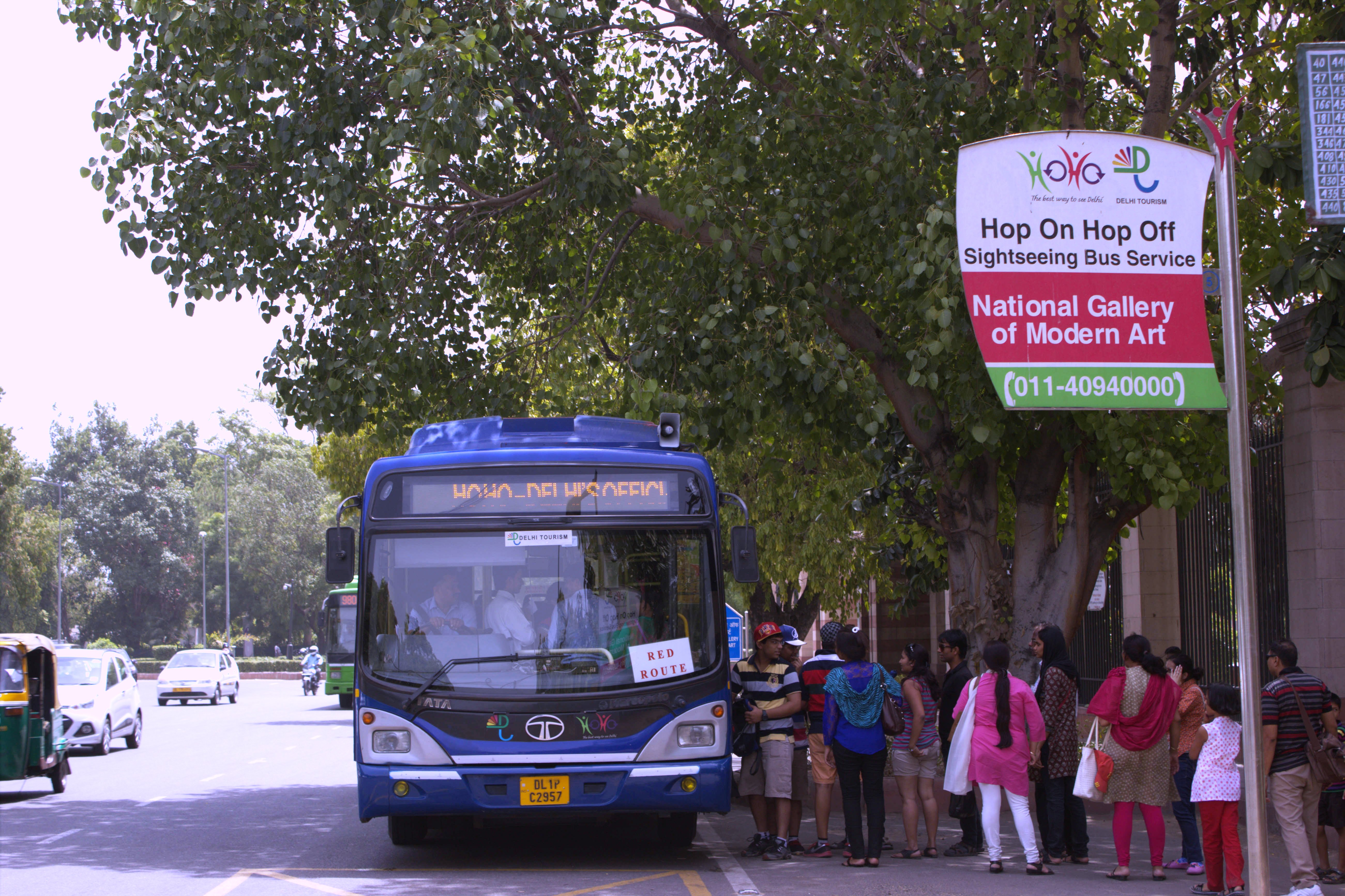
Tourists using Hop On Hop Off Service at National Gallery of Modern Art, New Delhi, India

=== Tourist facilitation ===
A large number of tourists arrive in the capital of Delhi every year. Activities provided to tourists include international air ticketing and foreign exchange banking, taxi services, Hop-On/Hop-Off Bus service HoHo Delhi, India's first hop-on hop-off bus launched in October 2010. It provides sightseeing service to tourists who are willing to explore Delhi with a more flexible schedule. These tours are conducted in specially designed buses which move continuously along a route, allowing tourists to board or alight at any of the pick up/drop off points. In 2012, two routes were introduced Red and Green. One can opt for one/two day pass. Live Commentary in English and Hindi is also available.

=== Other tourist activities ===
The Corporation provides several other activities for tourists. They are:

- Garden of Five Senses - a landscaped park near Saket Metro Station and 2 km from Qutub Minar.
- Azad Hind Gram - a rural tourist complex with amphitheatre and a museum in the memory of the freedom fighter Subhas Chandra Bose
- four coffee houses - run by the Catering Division of DTTDC are located at prime locations in Delhi.
- Dilli Haat - a market providing items for sale directly by the craftsmen from different parts of the country at one place, recognised as an art, crafts and cultural centre of Delhi, which was visited by approximately 16 lakhs visitors in 2001. Work on Delhi's second Dilli Haat, in Pitampura, close to Pitampura TV Tower and spread over 3 hectares, began in 2008.
- Exhibition and Conference
- Musical Fountain - located at Ajmal Khan Park with water cascades synchronised to coloured lights, each show lasts 20 minutes.
- Sound and Light show (Son-et-lumiere) - takes place at the Old Fort, Delhi and projects the Fort's history realistically through weekly one-hour shows in Hindi and English covering the history of Delhi over a period of 5000 years. Other activities include boating at nearby lakes and arranging for para-sailing and mountaineering activities in India.

South Extension is an up market shopping area and several global brands are available here.

Chandni Chowk is India's largest wholesale market and tiny kiosks have brisk sales. It is located in Old Delhi. According to the history of Delhi Shah Jehan had planned the market for his daughter to shop at her will for whatever she wanted.

Dilli Haat is an addition to the magnificence of Delhi where artisans from various corners of India showcase their talent and sell their wares.

Besides the core activity of promotion of tourism, the Corporation directly sells liquor all over Delhi, which is one of the few activities that provides net profit to the corporation. The sale of liquor is carried out through liquor shops, which number over one hundred, and includes the direct selling of Indian Made Foreign Liquor (IMFL) and Country Made Liquor (CL).

The Corporation constructs flyovers as part of the development of infrastructure for easy commuting by tourists in Delhi. The revenue for the construction of some of the flyovers in Delhi has been generated from a share of profit that the Corporation earns from the sale of Country made Liquor (CL). The Corporation charges a flat rate of profit, a margin of Rs.6 per bottle of country liquor, of which a share of Rs.5/- has been fixed as a contribution towards the construction of flyovers. The construction is carried of tourism by transferring knowledge in areas of tour and tourism.

=== Festivals ===
- Qutub Festival
- TAJ MAHAL
- LAL KILA OR RED FORT
