= Higher Education Commission of India =

Government of India Higher Education Commission

Higher Education Commission of India (HECI) is the newly proposed draft bill for all the three higher education organisations viz. University Grants Commission (India), All India Council for Technical Education, National Council of Technical Education (NCTE) on 25 July 2005.
