= Pitam Pura =

Pitampura Pitampura
- Neighbourhood of Delhi
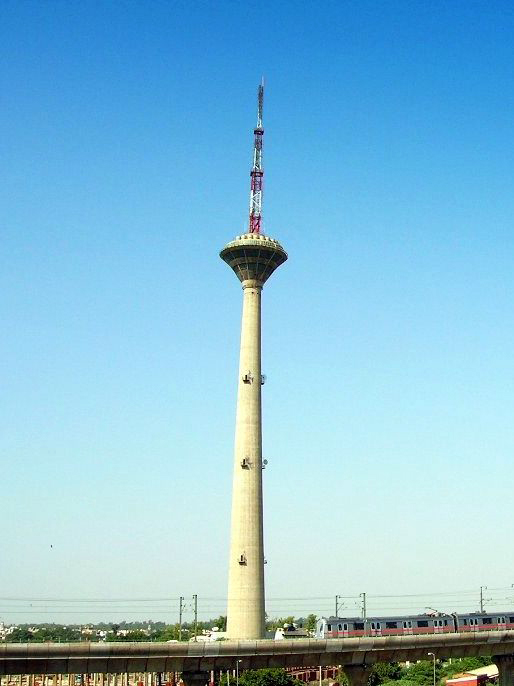
- Pitampura TV Tower, built in 1988

- Location within Delhi Location within India
- Coordinates: 28°42′11″N 77°7′56″E
- Country: India
- State: Delhi
- District: North West Delhi

Government
  - Body: Municipal Corporation of Delhi

Population
  - Total: 6.5 Million

Languages
  - Official: Hindi, English
- Time zone: UTC+5:30 (IST)
- PIN: 110034
- Telephone code: 011
- Civic agency: Municipal Corporation of Delhi

Pitampura is a residential area in North West Delhi district of Delhi, India. It is located adjacent to Rohini. It is a planned neighbourhood developed by the Delhi Development Authority in the 1980s and Pitampura TV Tower, was built in 1988. Dilli Haat Pitampura is also situated near the TV tower. Situated in west Delhi, it is an upscale residential, commercial and retail centre. The area is encompassed between Outer and Inner Ring Roads, NH-1 and Rohtak Road. It has two wards, Pitampura and Pitampura North, under the Keshav Puram zone of Municipal Corporation of Delhi.

It is serviced by the Pitampura metro station, Kohat Enclave, and Netaji Subhash Place metro station of Delhi Metro's Red Line.

== Overview ==
It is home to many government servants from central administrative services. This locality got its name from the "Pitampura Village" located near Madhuban Chowk, this village's history is around 400–500 years old. It was developed by the Delhi Development Authority in 1980s.

Delhi's second Dilli Haat, a traditional food and crafts bazaar, was developed by Delhi Tourism and Transportation Development Corporation in Pitampura, close to Pitampura TV Tower and spread over 7.2 hectares, started in 2003, and opened in April 2008. Delhi Development Authority has developed a new HIG Housing Complex near TV Tower, as a part of its Delhi Development Authority Housing Scheme – 2008.

Pitampura also attracts people from all over Delhi for shopping due to many high-class brands present and the presence of Netaji Subhash Place, Pitampura, a place to hang out.

== Attractions ==
The various major attractions of the region are

- Dilli Haat Pitampura
- Pacific Mall NSP
- Sita Ram Diwan Chand (Paharganj)
- Kuremal Kulfi (Chandni Chowk)
- Sita Ram Pethe Wala (Khari Baoli)
- Pitampura TV Tower
- District Park
- Netaji Subhash Place
- City Park Hotel
- Max Hospital, Shalimar Bagh (nearby)

== Education ==
Several schools, colleges and vocational training institutes are growing in number here. A few of these are:

- Sri Guru Gobind Singh College of Commerce (Delhi University)
- Keshav Mahavidaylaya (Delhi University)
- Vivekananda Institute of Professional Studies (GGSIPU)
- Management Studies:Magnum Opus School of Business Studies, Netaji Subhash Place
- Schools: Rukmini Devi Public School, Maharaja Agrasen Model School, St.Stephens School Pitampura, Kendriya Vidyalaya TP Block Pitampura, Ravindra Public School, D.A.V. Public School, Pushpanjali Enclave, Apeejay School, Maxfort School, Bal Bharati Public School, Pitampura, S.D. Public School, Darbari Lal DAV Model School, Guru Nanak Public School, KIIT World School and Abhinav Public School.
- Coaching Institutes: VMC, FIITJEE, Career Launcher, Aakash Institute, Clat Possible, Allen, Physics Wallah, Coding Blocks and many more.

== Dilli Haat (Pitampura) ==
Dilli Haat at Pitampura is located in north-west Delhi, near the TV Tower. It is the second project of its kind developed by the [[Delhi Tourism and Transportation Development Corporation|Delhi Tourism and Transport Development Corporation (DTTDC)]]. Inspired by the remarkable success of the original Dilli Haat at the INA Market, the DTTDC decided to establish a larger and more enhanced version of the concept at Pitampura.

The Pitampura Haat, like its progenitor at the INA market, will showcase tribal art and craft, culture, cuisine, music, as well as the essence of street culture. The gateway to the Haat will serve as a street plaza. Vendors selling everything from paper toys and balloons to popcorn will get space on the walkway, giving a feel of Delhi's street culture.

The Haat is planned to include a spice court for the sale of spices and an art court with an exhibition and art gallery space. The craft shops are organised in two blocks along a central axis. An amphitheatre and a food court are located at the rear of the Haat, and access to the food court is through the craft stores.

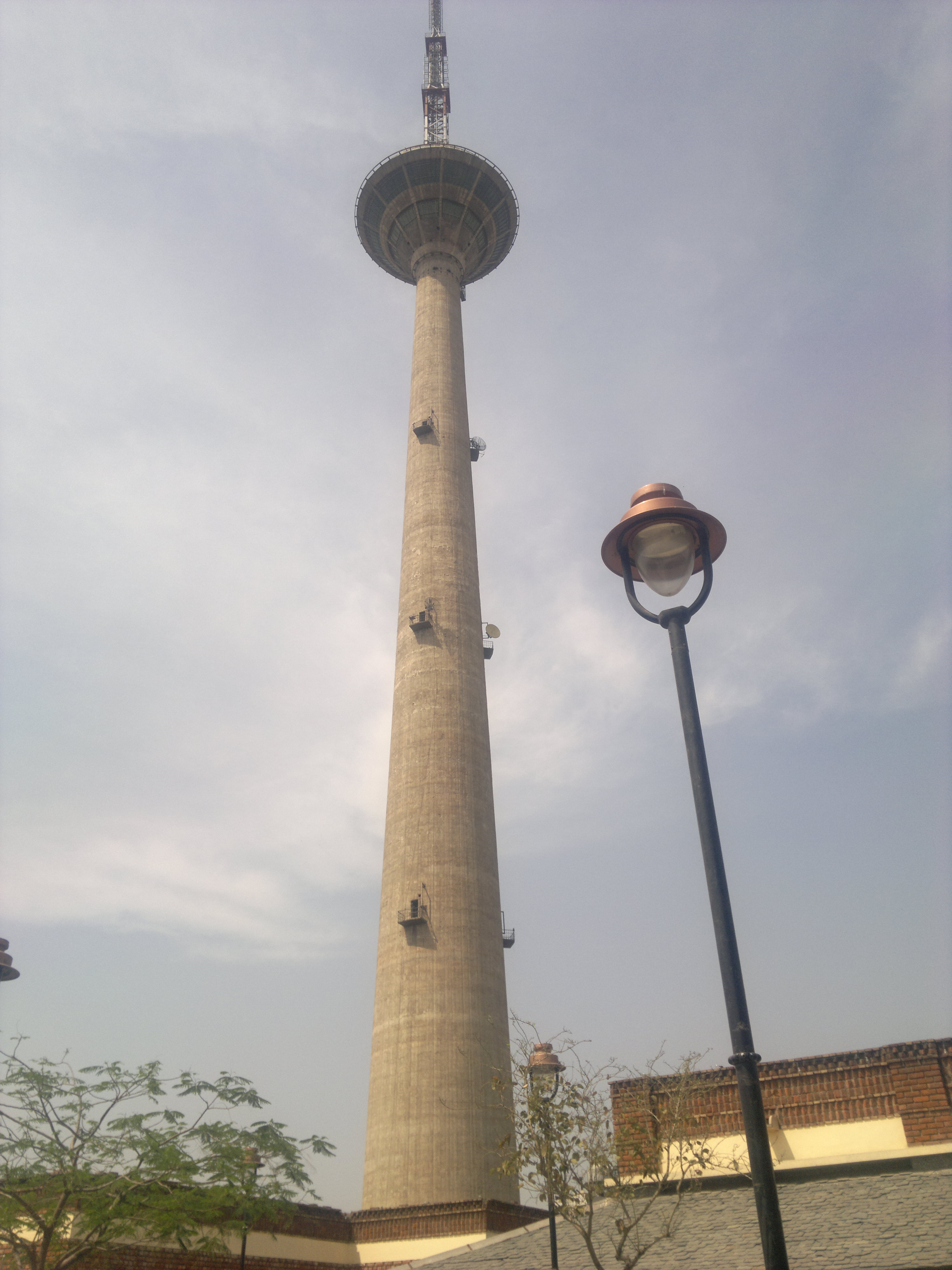
Pitampura TV tower as seen from Dilli Haat, Pitampura, New Delhi

== Accessibility ==
As many as three Delhi Metro Stations - Netaji Subhash Place, Kohat Enclave and Pitampura, cover this locality.

It is very close to Rohini, Model Town, Shalimar Bagh, Punjabi Bagh, Ashok Vihar, Lawrence Road areas. Pitampura has many housing colonies like Deepali Enclave, Tarun Enclave, Pushpanjali Enclave, West Enclave, Sharda Niketan, Nishant Kunj, Kohat Enclave, SD-Tower Apartments (known for the largest Super HIG flats by the Delhi Development Authority and also for its nearness to Netaji Subhash district center and TV Tower), Vaishali, Saraswati Vihar (the largest colony of Pitampura), Lok Vihar, Ajay Apartments, Apna Ghar Society, Bank Vihar, I.D.P.L. Colony, Kohat Enclave, Rohit Kunj, Sandesh Vihar, Jhulelal Apartments, Engineer's Enclave, Harsh Vihar, Kapil Vihar, Vishakha Enclave, Maurya Enclave, Rani Bagh etc. These societies have various facilities like community centers, central parks, and parking lots.
