= Ajmer (disambiguation) =

Ajmer is a city in Ajmer district, Rajasthan, India.

Ajmer can also refer to:

== Places ==
=== Present ===
- Ajmer district

- Ajmer tehsil

- Ajmer railway division
- Roman Catholic Diocese of Ajmer
- Ajmer, Gujarat, a village

=== Historical ===
- Ajmer State, former state of India
- Ajmer Subah, in the Mughal Empire

== People ==
- Ajmer Rode, Canadian author
- Ajmer Singh (athlete) (1940–2010), Indian sprinter
- Ajmer Singh (author), Indian-born author
- Ajmer Singh Aulakh, Indian playwright
- Ajmer Singh Chopra (born 1953), Indian basketball player
