= Pushpindar Singh =

Aviator and military historian (1943–2021)

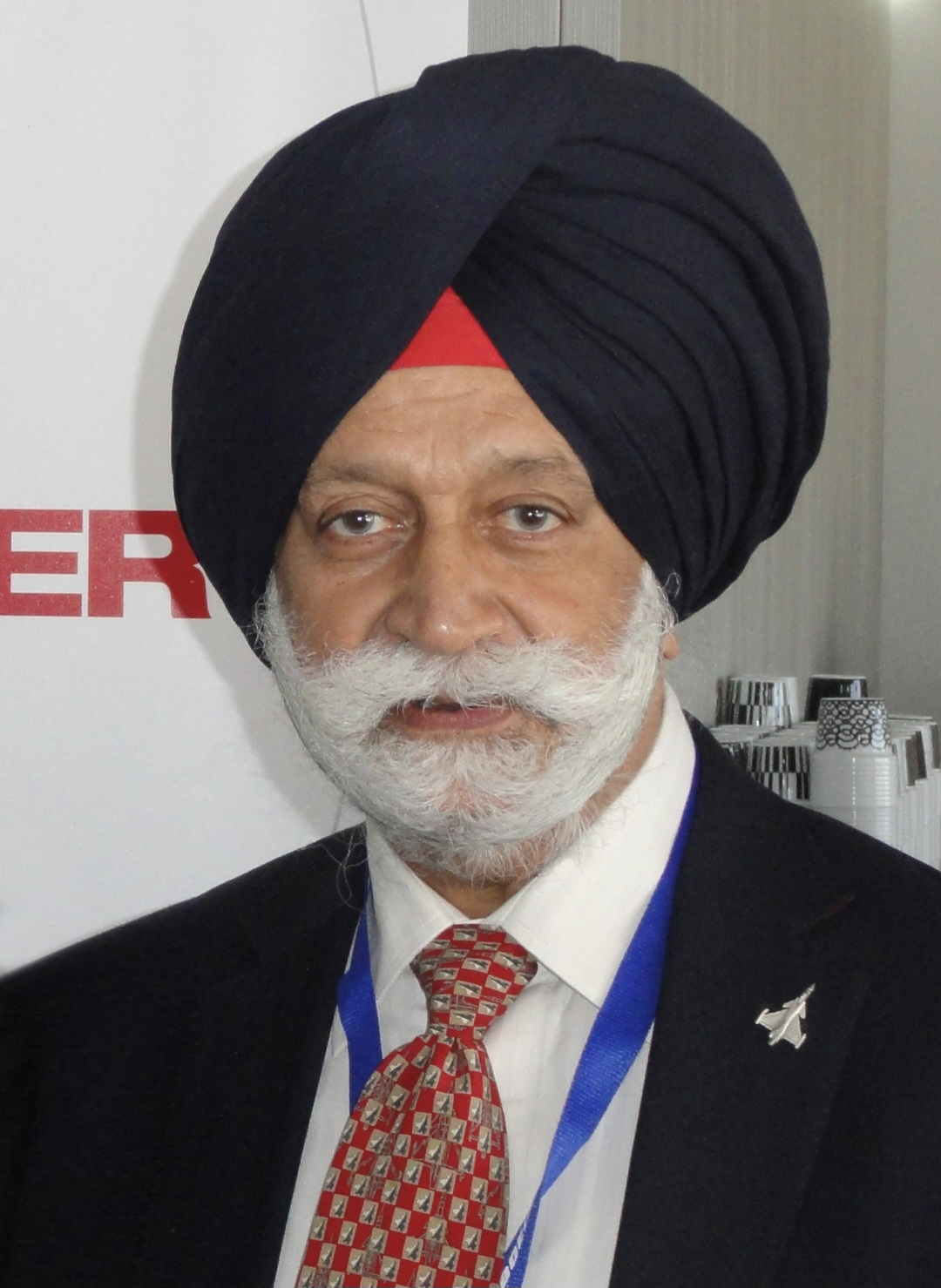
- Pushpindar Singh, the Founder Vayu Aerospace, the "Guru of Indian Aviation"
- Born: 30 September 1943; Murree, Punjab, British India (present-day Punjab, Pakistan)
- Died: 3 May 2021 (aged 77); Gurgaon, India
- Education: The Doon School
- Occupations: Historian, editor, author
- Organization(s): Rallis; Dornier Flugzeugwerke; Vayu Aerospace and Defence Review; Daimler Benz; Jullundur Brigade Association; Nishaan Nagaara; The Sikh Forum
- Notable work: The Himalayan Eagles Trilogy; The Indian Air Force and its Aircraft; Fiza'Ya: Psyche of the Pakistan Air Force; 1947: A Soldier's Story
- Relatives: Mohindar Singh Chopra (father)

Pushpindar Singh (30 September 1943 – 3 May 2021), also known as Pushpindar Singh Chopra, was an aviation journalist, historian, businessman and the author of several books, chiefly on military aviation history of India. His work and developments on Indian Aviation lead to the Fairchild-Dornier 288 production in India. He is known as the 'Chronicler of Aviation History' and 'Guru of Indian Aviation'.

He was known as the only defence analyst and aviator who was respected equally in India as Pakistan, along with being a well known aviation specialist in countries like United Kingdom, Germany and the rest of Europe as well. His magazine Vayu Aerospace and Defence Review was India's most read aerospace defence magazine.

== Early life and family ==
Pushpindar Singh was born in Murree, British India (now part of Pakistan) and spent his youth in old Lahore. He was educated at The Doon School, Dehra Dun in a military background. He was born to Jagjit Kaur Kapur and Major General Mohindar Singh Chopra, a famed general in the Indian Army who was responsible for stopping the riots during the Partition of Punjab and helping refugees going to Pakistan and coming to India.

He had graduated from Government College, Chandigarh. Pushpindar Singh originally worked at the Engineering Division of Gillanders Arbuthnot & Co Ltd in Calcutta, and later with Rallis in Bombay, where he quickly made a name for himself in marketing and sales.

== Aerospace journalism career ==
After being heavily involved with the occurrences during the 1965 Indo-Pakistan War, he became invested in writing articles for different magazines and journals, making his own aviation magazine in 1974. He became the founder-editor of the Vayu Aerospace and Defence Review, and was Indian editor for the Air International, World Air Power Journal, Asian Defence Journal, Jane's Defence Weekly, Aeromag, and Royal Aeronautical Society and Aviation Week & Space Technology. Pushpindar Singh's writings on the Indian aviation and defence matters, impacting too on the international stage for over five decades, have inspired and encouraged generations of those who later joined the industry and are continuing to serve the profession with honour. He wrote extensively about the history of the Indian Air Force, from its inception in 1933 till present day in his publications and articles.

During an earlier Farnborough Air Show, he was given a special award for his breaking news story on the Indian LCA programme from the Royal Aeronautical Society of the UK. In 2015, at the Aerospace Media Awards held at the Paris Air Show, he was awarded 'Lifetime Achievement Award' for Outstanding Contribution to Aviation Journalism'. During an earlier Farnborough Air Show, he was given a special award for his breaking news story on the Indian LCA programme from the Royal Aeronautical Society of the United Kingdom.

=== Vayu Aerospace and Defence Review ===
The Vayu Aerospace and Defence Review is the most well known and most read Indian aviation magazine, launched in 1974 it slowly grew to become an authority on the Indian Air Force. It is also India's oldest trade publication, and regularly publish Show Directories and Show Dailies (and officially have done so multiple times in India). Vayu's claim to fame came from articles debunking conspiracies by the Pakistan Air Force during the 1965 Indo-Pakistan War where he interviewed IAF and PAF pilots. His article, 'Laying the Sargodha Ghost to Rest', in Vayu Aerospace Review in November 1985 was a trailblazer amongst others, which led to debunking the myth of Pakistan Air Force's claim of shooting down five Indian Air Force Hunters on 7 September 1965. Other famous articles (featured in various magazines) include, "The Decade of the Shamsher", "Home is the Hunter", "Journal of an Air War", "Harnessing the Storm Spirit (Marut)", "The Thunderbolts", "Guarding India’s Coastline" and many others.

== Aerospace and Defence history career ==
Pushpindar Singh wrote books about the Indian Air Force starting from 1971, and slowly virtually became the historian-emeritus of India's air arm. The definitive three-volume magnum opus spanning more than seven hundred pages titled Himalayan Eagles: History of the Indian Air Force, written for the Platinum Jubilee in 2007, occupies pride of place in every Air Force library and squadron crew room. He was also responsible for the immense respect and recognition that Arjan Singh received before he became an Air Marshal in the Indian Army, and Hardit Singh Malik's story being mainstream in Indian Air Force circles. It would not be an understatement to say that the work of Pushpindar Singh has been regularly used as official reference material by officers and airmen of all generations, looking to learn about the IAF's past and its journey. To his distinction, he published books on the occasions of IAF's Golden Jubilee, Diamond Jubilee and Platinum Jubilee. Pushpindar Singh also founded the publishing group and think-tank known as the Society for Aerospace Studies.

=== Aircraft histories ===
The book, "A Whale of a Fighter" is the most extensive history of the production, manufacture and military use of the Sukhoi Su-7, its most well-known chapter was one which debunked Chuck Yeager's allegations during the 1971 Indo-Pakistan War. The HAL HF-24 Marut is possibly one of the most well-developed fighter aircraft developed in India competing with the HAL Tejas, it has an elaborate history along with an extensive service that it had seen, hence Pushpindar Singh wrote the 'Spirits of the Wind' to document its history and use in the Indian Air Force. 'First to the Last: 50 years of MiG-21s with the IAF', compiled by Pushpindar Singh and Air Marshal Philip Rajkumar, a former was a pilot of the plane, it includes well-researched and anecdotes from pilots such as Air Marshal Norman Anil Kumar Browne, Air Marshal Anil Yashwant Tipnis, Air Marshal Satish Inamdar and Air Commodore Suren Tyagi. Pushpindar Singh's book the 'Sabre Slayers' details the Folland Gnat, a lightweight fighter, served the Indian Air Force effectively in the 1960s, known for its agility and speed, it played a crucial role in aerial combat training.

=== Squadron histories ===
Pushpindar Singh spent a great amount of time documenting the histories of various squadrons of the Indian Air Force and has written articles on the same in his magazine as well, along with books on few famous squadrons. 'The Battle Axes' provides a detailed history of the No.7 Squadron of the Indian Air Force which has formed the basis for this history in popular aviation circles. The publication is based on the Squadron diaries maintained by the squadron till date, which was inaccessible and in their station in Gwalior till the publication- where the activities of the illustrious squadron was uncovered and brought to light. 'The 'Black Archers' is an illustrated history of the No.47 Squadron of the Indian Air Force MiG-29UPGs (based in Adampur) and its history along with its military use.

Pushpindar Singh's book 'Dragon Fire' provides details of the No.6 Squadron, which is one of the more well known squadrons due to its roles in the 1965 and 1971 Indo-Pakistan Wars. The title of the book 'The First Supersonics' is the nickname of the No.28 Squadron, because it was the first squadron in the IAF to be equipped with supersonic Mikoyan MiG-21s in 1963. The book provides an analysis of the use of the squadron, from the 1971 to the Kargil War. 'Tigers in the Sky' was written after No.1 Squadron nicknamed the 'Tigers' is the oldest and first squadron of the Indian Air Force, the book is a reference book for the squadron's history and use, which is very extensive considering the amount of action the squadron has seen. His book 'Valiant to the Last' is about the No.221 Squadron known as the 'Valiants'. 'The Tuskers' or No. 5 Squadron of the Indian Air Force are another well-known squadron, he wrote extensively of its role in the Congo Crisis as part of the United Nations peacekeeping forces. 'The Fighting Fourteen' (No. 14) was published on the 60th anniversary, it mentions their role in the 1965 Indo-Pakistan War and 1971 Indo-Pakistan War.

=== Himalayan Eagles ===
The Himalayan Eagles was a three-volume magnum opus spanning over 700 pages in total on the Indian Air Force's history, it includes detailed descriptions of the development of the Indian Air Force's power and past history. The Indian Air Force considers the series as the best histography on itself. It was written for the Platinum Jubilee in 2007, and occupies pride of place in every Air Force library and squadron crew room. The first volume released in 2007 was titled, 'Foundations', second volume was titled 'Consolidation and Expansion' and lastly the third volume is named 'World Air Power'. The three books deal with different aspects, times and scenarios that the Indian Air Force had gone through and is valued and cherished by the Indian Air Force.

=== Fiza'Ya: Psyche of the Pakistan Air Force ===
His book, Fiza'Ya: Psyche of the Pakistan Air Force with author Ravi Rikhye and photographer Peter Steinmann was a groundbreaking reference book on the history on the Pakistan Air Force, and was written to document the history of the Pakistan Air Force's investments and their military history, it is the primary resource for the Pakistan Air Force, their aviators, military historians and researchers. The book showcases how Pakistan, despite all the political turmoil it has gone through, could still produce a first-class air force. It was and is heavily appreciated by Pakistani politicians and aviators alike, including Prime Minister Nawaz Sharif, Air Marshal Malik Nur Khan, Air Commodore Sayed Sajad Haider, Air Chief Marshal Zaheer Ahmad Babar Sidhu and many more- and is used as one of the primary reference books of the Pakistan Air Force. Pushpindar Singh promoted Indo-Pakistan friendship, was a great admirer of the Pakistan Air Force despite the rocky relationship with his home country.

The Pakistan Fiza’Ya (Pakistan Air Force) plays a role in the psyche of its nation unmatched by any Air Force in the world except that by the Israeli Air Force. The PAF’s motto, loosely translated from Persian is ‘Lord of All I Survey’. It calls itself ‘The Pride of the Nation’, and is exactly that.

— Pushpindar Singh Chopra, Fiza’Ya: Psyche of the Pakistan Air Force

=== Neuve Chapelle: The Jullundur Brigade in France & Flanders ===
He also published Neuve Chapelle: The Jullundur Brigade in France & Flanders, 1914-1915 commemorating the Jullundur Brigade's role in the Battles of Ypres and Neuve Chapelle during the First World War. It was published for the Jullundur Brigade Association (of which Pushpindar Singh was the vice-president), the book documents the role of the Jullundur Brigade in the First World War. The (8th) Jullundur Brigade of the (3rd) Lahore Division was perhaps unique in the fact that from 1912 to 1918, three of its constituent battalions were banded together, being the 1st Manchester Regiment, the 47th Sikhs and the 59th Scinde Rifles FF, which were to remain continuously in action from October 1914 till end of the Great War. The Indian Corps were amongst the earliest troops on the Western Front. The Jullundur Brigade went to war on 23 October 1914 and fought at the First Battle of Ypres, Neuve Chapelle, Givenchy, capture of Neuve Chapelle, the second Ypres, Festubert and the Loos offensive.

=== 1947: a Soldiers' Story ===
His book 1947: a Soldiers' Story was written from the notes of Pushpindar Singh’s father- Maj. Gen. Mohindar Singh Chopra, it details the military aspect of containing riots that shook India and an exodus in proportions that had never been seen before throughout history. His father had contained riots in Bengal and Punjab, the two most violence-prone regions. Most accounts and books relating to the Partition of India detail the communal aspect and do not take notice of the Indian and Pakistan armies' role in stopping riots on both sides of the border along with providing relief and rehabilitation to the victims of such riots. It is laced with personal accounts from his fathers diaries. It provides details of the relatively unknown military conflicts that had escalated before the Kashmir problem arose and the establishment of the famous Wagah-Attari Border dividing the twin cities of Lahore and Amritsar and creating a crevice in the centre of Punjab. It also contains descriptions of the immense effort that the Indian Army put into controlling the riots, which within two months of the army entering the scene under Brig. Chopra went from 125,000 deaths per month to no deaths in late December, a military accomplishment of unimaginable proportions.

=== Portrait of Courage ===
He also published Portrait of Courage: Century of the 5th Battalion, The Sikh Regiment on the Sikh Regiment's centenary event, co-authored by Maj. Gen. Prem Khanna. It details the history of the Sikh Regiment from its foundation in the Anglo-Sikh Wars through its involvement in Sudan, China, Afghanistan, the World Wars, Indo-Pakistan Wars and other major military and historical events. Along with being an authority on aerospace, he also had a keen interest in military history, and was the founder of the 'Military Studies Convention' based in New Delhi and co-founder of the 'Delhi Forum for Strategic Studies'.

=== Other publications ===
Touching the Sky is one of the more well-read books on the state of the Indian Air Force in the 1990s and how the expansion of the Indian Air Force had been taken up by the Indian Government through the 1970s till the 1990s and the future of the aircraft in use. It was used as a road to expansion in the coming years and provides a detailed analysis of the capabilities of the force.

The book 'Fly Navy' remains the primary book on Indian Naval aviation, and the Indian Naval Air Arm to be specific. It is an illustrated work detailing the growth of the Indian Navy's air capabilities though its years at work, from the Liberation of Goa onwards. An updated version named, "Fly Navy, Fly" was released posthumously, and inaugurated by Navy Chief Admiral Karambir Singh and President Ram Nath Kovind on the Naval Air Arm's 68th foundation anniversary.

== Dornier Flugzeugwerke ==
=== Fairchild-Dornier 228 ===
One of his largest breakthroughs was the launching of the Fairchild-Dornier 228, he was a representative of Dornier Flugzeugwerke (heading it in 1978) in India at the time, which has been one of India's greatest aeronautical accomplishments till date and allowed for the main production of the plane to be in India, the fuselage, wings and tail unit are manufactured by HAL in Kanpur, India. He was the representative of the company in India for many years. This project was the first in the list of many successful Indian Air Force plane development projects with international collaboration, specifically from Germany in this case. He also worked on the HAL Tejas and the HAL HF-24 Marut with Hindustan Aeronautics Limited before. Dornier Flugzeugwerke also wished to co-produce the HAL Tejas, though the Indian Government rejected it due to lack of foresight. He followed indigenous designs such as the Hindustan Aeronautics Limited, National Aerospace Laboratories and Aeronautical Development Agencies. After part of the company was bought by Dornier, Pushpindar Singh headed Daimler Benz (Mercedes Benz's Indian branch).

== Sikh History career ==
He had a close affiliation to Sikhism and in July 2014 he was invited to be part of the centre for Guru Granth Sahib Studies at Rakab Ganj in New Delhi and a member of the International Institute of Sikh Studies. He was also made President of The Sikh Forum and was founder-editor of the Nishaan Nagaara magazine, an ‘Illustrated Journal of the Sikhs’.

=== Nishaan Nagaara ===
Pushpindar Singh founded the 'Nishaan Nagaara', a non-political journal, to highlight Sikh issues, culture, history and heritage in April 1999. The first issue was formally launched at New Delhi on 22 April 1999 and was inaugurated by Prime Minister Manmohan Singh, Dr. Jaswant Singh Neki and Chief Minister Dr. Karan Singh. The magazine collaborates which magazines like SikhNet, and scholars such as Inder Jit Singh of New York and Bhayee Sikander Singh of Bagrian and one can find it in many a Sikh home.

=== The Sikh Forum ===
He was made the President of The Sikh Forum and protested for justice for the 1984 Anti-Sikh Riots, and passed a resolution seeking declaration of the violence as "Sikh Genocide Day". He multiple times condemned the riots, wrote letters to the Prime Minister and staged protests demanding justice for the Anti-Sikh riots. As a response to a letter from The Sikh Forum written by him on the anniversary of Operation Blue Star- the Home Minister had given back 53 historical books to the Golden Temple which had been looted from the Sikh Reference Library, with the help of Tarlochan Singh. He pushed for a Truth and Reconciliation Commission for the events that happened in 1984. He spoke against the Sikh community being termed as Khalistani and believed it was wrong for every member of the Sikh diaspora to be painted with the "extremist brush."

== Death ==
Pushpindar Singh Chopra died due to COVID-19 in Gurgaon on 3 May 2021.

== Publications ==
=== Books ===
- A Guide to Air Power in Asia and the Pacific (1971)
- Aircraft of the Indian Air Force (1974)
- A Directory of Combat Aircraft in Asia (1980)
- The Indian Air Force and its Aircraft (1982)
- A Whale of a Fighter (1983)
- Touching the Sky (1991)
- Fiza'Ya (1991)
- Sabre Slayers (1991)
- The Battle Axes (1993)
- 1947: a Soldier's Story (1997)
- Diamonds in the Sky (2000)
- Portrait of Courage (2001)
- History of Aviation of India (2003)
- Fly Navy (2006)
- When Lightnings Strike (2006)
- Himalayan Eagles – Consolidation and Expansion (2007)
- Himalayan Eagles – World Air Power (2007)
- Himalayan Eagles – Foundations (2007)
- Tigers in the Sky (2008)
- Valiant to the Last (2009)
- The Black Archers (2009)
- The Fighting Fourteen (2011)
- On the Wings of Gold (2011)
- Spirits of the Wind (2011)
- Dragon Fire (2012)
- First to the Last (2013)
- The First Supersonics (2013)
- Neuve Chapelle (2014)
- Tusker Charge (2014)
- Harlow to Hawk (2017)
- Fly Navy, Fly (2022)
- Icon of the Sky (2025)
- Fiza’Ya Part II (2025)

=== Magazines ===
- Vayu Aerospace and Defence Review (1973 – present)
- Nishaan Nagaara Magazine (1999 – present)
