= Ajmer Singh =

Ajmer Singh may refer to:

- Ajmer Singh (athlete) (1940–2010), Indian sprinter
- Ajmer Singh Aulakh (1942–2017), Punjabi playwright
- Ajmer Singh (author) (born 1948), Sikh intellectual and writer
- Ajmer Singh (basketball) (born 1953), Indian basketball player
