= The Gurdaspur Award =

The Gurdaspur Award was a set of negotiations and a small series of diplomatic and military standoffs on the position of Amritsar (and the rest of Majha) during the Partition of India.

== Diplomatic negotiations ==
Originally, the whole Gurdaspur and Lahore districts were awarded to Pakistan, and Amritsar was a lone Indian exclave within Pakistani territory (not counting the Kapurthala State which was independent at the time). The June 3rd Partition Plan by Sir Cyril Radcliffe was demographic in nature and hence Gurdaspur was awarded to Pakistan, as over 60 percent of the Lahore district was Muslim-majority and roughly 51 percent of Gurdaspur district.

Though seeing the Sikhs had lost vast lands awarded to them through the years of British rule in the Canal colonies, Lord Mountbatten had negotiated that Pakistan would receive the Buddhist-Hindu dominated Eastern Hill tracts in East Pakistan (now Bangladesh). In reward to the Sikhs, within the Gurdaspur district- the Gurdaspur, Batala and Pathankot tehsils were awarded to India while Shakargarh was given to Pakistan. In Lahore, Patti and Thana were given to India, forming half of the current Tarn Taran district.

== Military confrontation ==
In August 1947, Pakistani flags were hoisted in Gurdaspur D.C.'s office and Mushtaq Ahmed Cheema as the new Deputy Commissioner of "Pakistani Gurdaspur", and there was small scale violence against Sikhs and Hindus in the district.

After two days, the 123 Indian Infantry Brigade under Brigadier Mohindar Singh Chopra had been sent and took over the office and the district. The Muslim caravans leaving the area were given protection by the Indian and Pakistani armies and there was no instance of mass-violence after September in Gurdaspur. India had also been given Qaidian, an Islamic (Ahmadiyya) holy city which Pakistan wanted as Ahmadiyaas at the time were very pro-Pakistan. Many Punjabi Hindus from West Punjab were resettled in Gurdaspur and Batala.
