= The Sikh Forum =

Non-profit organisation based in India

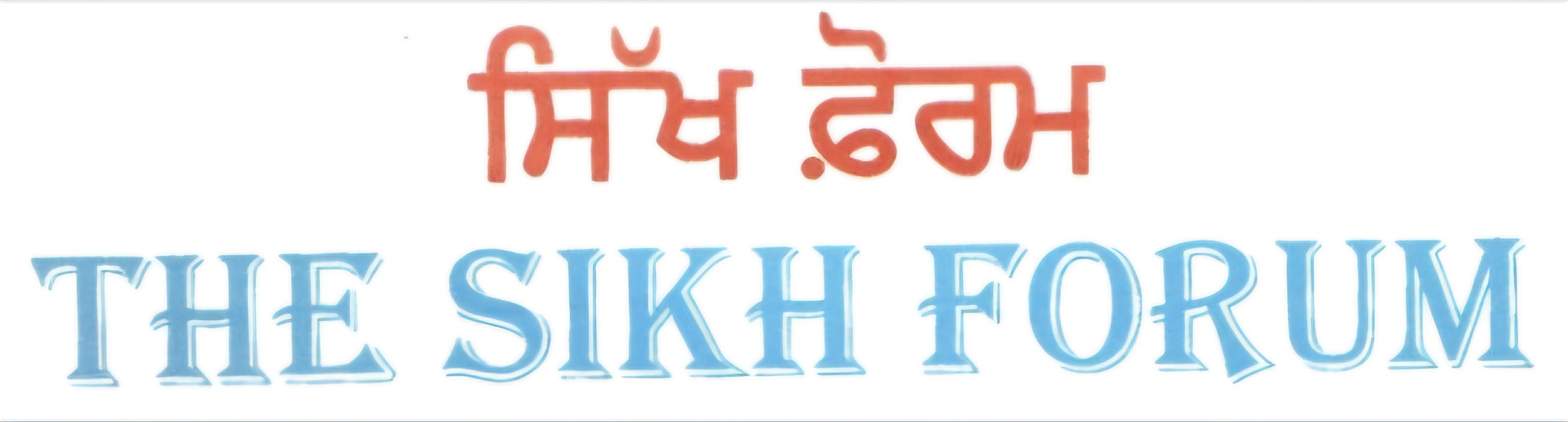

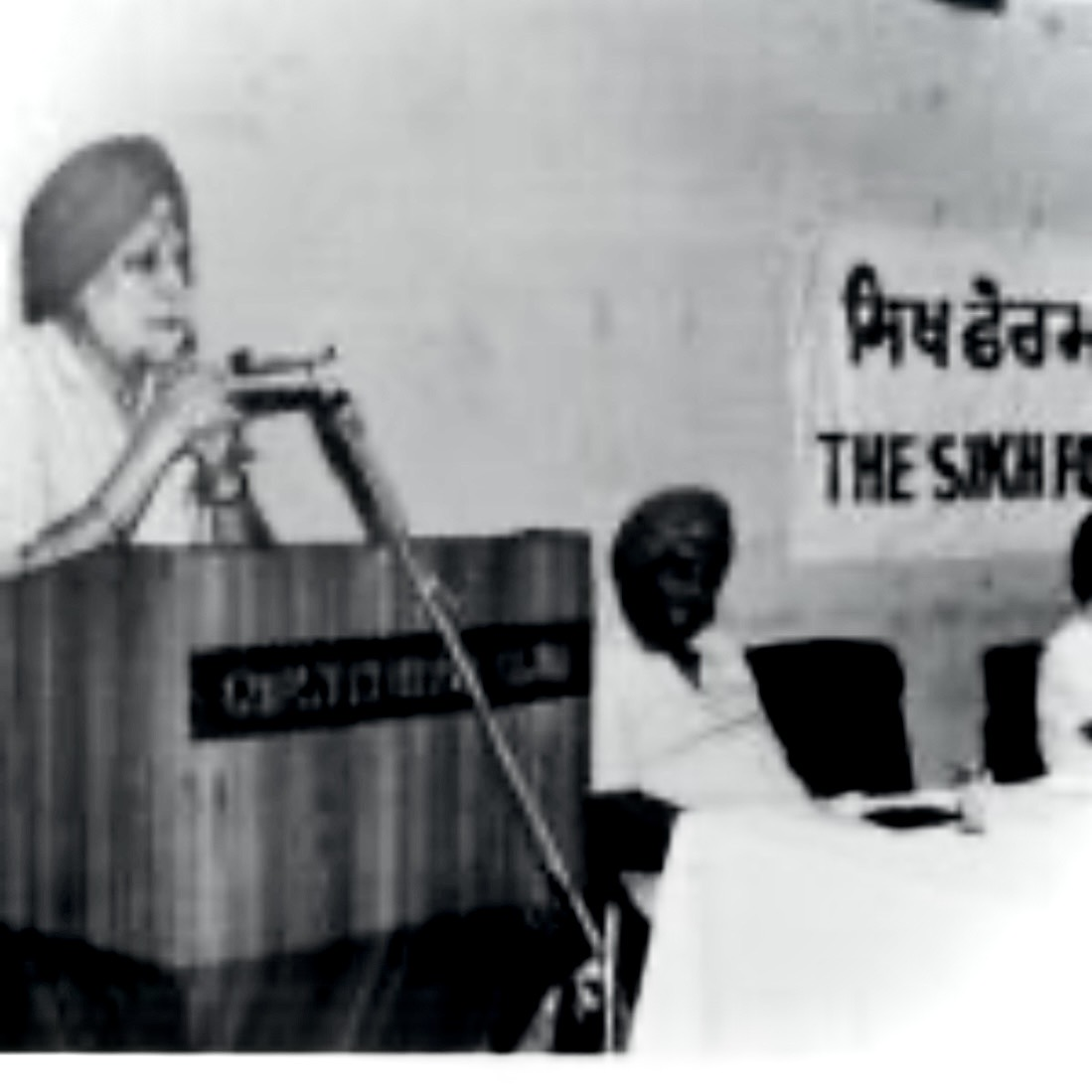
- Lt. Gen. Jagjit Singh Aurora making his founding speech at The Sikh Forum.
- Formation: 7 February 1985
- Type: Pressure Group/Governing Body
- Headquarters: C-20-B, Green Park Extension, New Delhi
- Location: New Delhi, India
- President: Ravinder Singh Ahuja
- Website: https://thesikhforum.org/

The Sikh Forum is an apolitical, non-profit body formed in 1985 in the aftermath of the 1984 anti-Sikh riots. It was founded under the leadership of Lt. Gen. Jagjit Singh Aurora, and the organisation was created to provide a platform for Sikh intellectuals, servicemen, professionals, civil servants, military officers, jurists and academics to address issues affecting the Sikh community.

Since its establishment, the Forum has helped in establishing seminars, conferences, public speeches and more on various topics like religious issues, governance, public representation and justice for the victims of 1984 and afterwards. It became to be one of the largest and most influential Sikh organisations in the late twentieth century.

== History ==
=== Establishment ===
It was formed under the main leaders of Lt. Gen. Jagjit Singh Aurora, Dr. Mandeep Singh, Gian Singh Sandhu, Dr. Amrik Singh and Gurmukh Singh Jeet; it total there were 32 prominent members who were present during the start of the Forum on 7 February 1985. The other members included Capt. Amarinder Singh, his brother Malvinder Singh, Brig. Sukhijit Singh, Justice Ranjit Singh Narula, Air Marshal Arjan Singh, Lt. Gen. Gurbachan Singh Raja, Justice Gurdev Singh, Bishan Singh Samudri and more. Raja Singh of Texla Television gave an office in Jangpura for The Sikh Forum, they also had an editorial office in Masjid Road, Bhogal.

=== Criticism and protests ===
On 18 March 1985 they had publications in a slew of national newspapers in Capt. Amarinder Singh's name. The publications included an open letter to Prime Minister Rajiv Gandhi which was initially sent on 24 February 1985 about how to console the Sikhs in the aftermath of the last year and a justification of the Anandpur Sahib Resolution. The letter gained lots of media attention and Haryana Pradesh Congress Chief Sultan Singh along with ex-M.P. Amarjit Kaur had called the organisation extremist, which was shot down in a joint statement from the president, Jagjit Singh Aurora, and the Covernor, Capt. Amarinder Singh.

The Sikh Forum did a 30-day hunger strike at Boat Club in which many Sikhs from Karnal and Kurukshetra also joined Delhi Sikhs to protest and bring attention to the issue of justice.

In 1993 Jagjit Singh Aurora had courted arrest as The Sikh Forum had staged a protest wherein journalist Rajinder Singh Pun, SAD (Amritsar) Delhi President Mohindar Singh and Janata Dal national secretary Ramvir Singh Bidhuri all courted arrest. The next year he had staged another protest and dharna at India Gate as well.

=== Committees and commissions ===
The Forum played a helping and advisory part in the Citizen's Justice Committee, the Jain Banerjee Committee, the Potti Rosha Committee, Marwah Commission, Misra Commission, R.K. Ahuja Committee, Kapur-Mittal Committee, the Dhillon Committee, the Justice Narula Committee and the Nanavati Commission. It also had influence over the Thakar Commission, Sarkaria Commission and the Punjab Accord. The Forum, for the duration of the committee, was an advisory body to the Citizen's Justice Committee.

The brainchild of the Misra Commission was the Sikh Forum, after the Marwah Commission was labelled a “whitewash”.

=== The Forum Gazette ===
The Sikh Forum contributed articles to the Hindustan Times, The Tribune, Times of India, Indian Express, Statesman and launched its own fortnightly magazine, the Forum Gazette, which is now defunct due to lack of resources.

The Forum Gazette was the newspaper of the Sikh Forum, which used to document all of the events relating to Punjab, injustices, South Africa, women's writing, casteism, environment, Khalistan, the Chandigarh problem and more. The Forum Gazette had major editors like Prime Minister I.K. Gujral, Jaya Jaitly, Khushwant Singh, Justice V.R. Krishna Iyer, Kuldip Nayar, A.S. Narang and Dr. Amrik Singh.

=== Charity and donations ===
The Sikh Forum also helped shed light on many people who participated in the anti-Sikh riots and helped get them imprisoned, they also donate to the families who were affected by the riots regularly. The Ciziens’ Justice Committee helped in this and they also helped provide relief to the Widow Colony in Trilokpuri. Many widows gathered at The Sikh Forum's office in Tilak Vihar in 1989, they were all given homes and shelter but they were noted to have hatred for Rajiv Gandhi.

=== Militancy and police brutality ===
Though a strong critic of Operation Blue Star, in May 1986, Lt. Gen. Aurora praised Surjit Singh Barnala's Operation Black Thunder, wherein the temple was not damaged and militants were removed without sacrilege. The Forum was strongly against Khalistan, separatism and terrorism, though they also criticised the police brutality that was happening across the villages of Punjab.

Lt. Gen. Aurora asked for a judicial inquiry into the police atrocities in Batala. In Parliament, Aurora gave details that villagers were rounded up, women were subjected to vile abuse, people were charged falsely with helping terrorists and the sarpanches who complained to the Governor S.S. Ray were beaten again by police. They also criticised the Pilhibit murders.

Later Patwant Singh, who staunchly criticised Gill previously, had refused to share the stage with him at an elite Delhi club. Another time, it was noted that a Sikh Forum leader had met with Gill and criticised him (it was noted he was a bleeding-heart liberal and from Delhi), and persisted lecturing him on the dangers of police brutality, when Gill replied that the conflict was between Jatt Sikhs (militants) and Jatt Sikhs (policemen), and that “Bhapas” (derogatory term for urban trading castes) had nothing to do with it. It has been alleged that the leader was Lt. Gen. Jagjit Singh Aurora himself from the description given.

=== In Parliament ===
Jagjit Singh Aurora often spoke in Parliament as the President of The Sikh Forum, rather than an M.P. Many other members of the Sikh Forum have been in the Parliament, though only General Aurora has spoken as a member and President. They also spoke against the positions Sajjan Kumar, Jagdish Tytler received in the Indian National Congress, and both of them shared a lawyer, R.K. Anand who also received a position in the party.

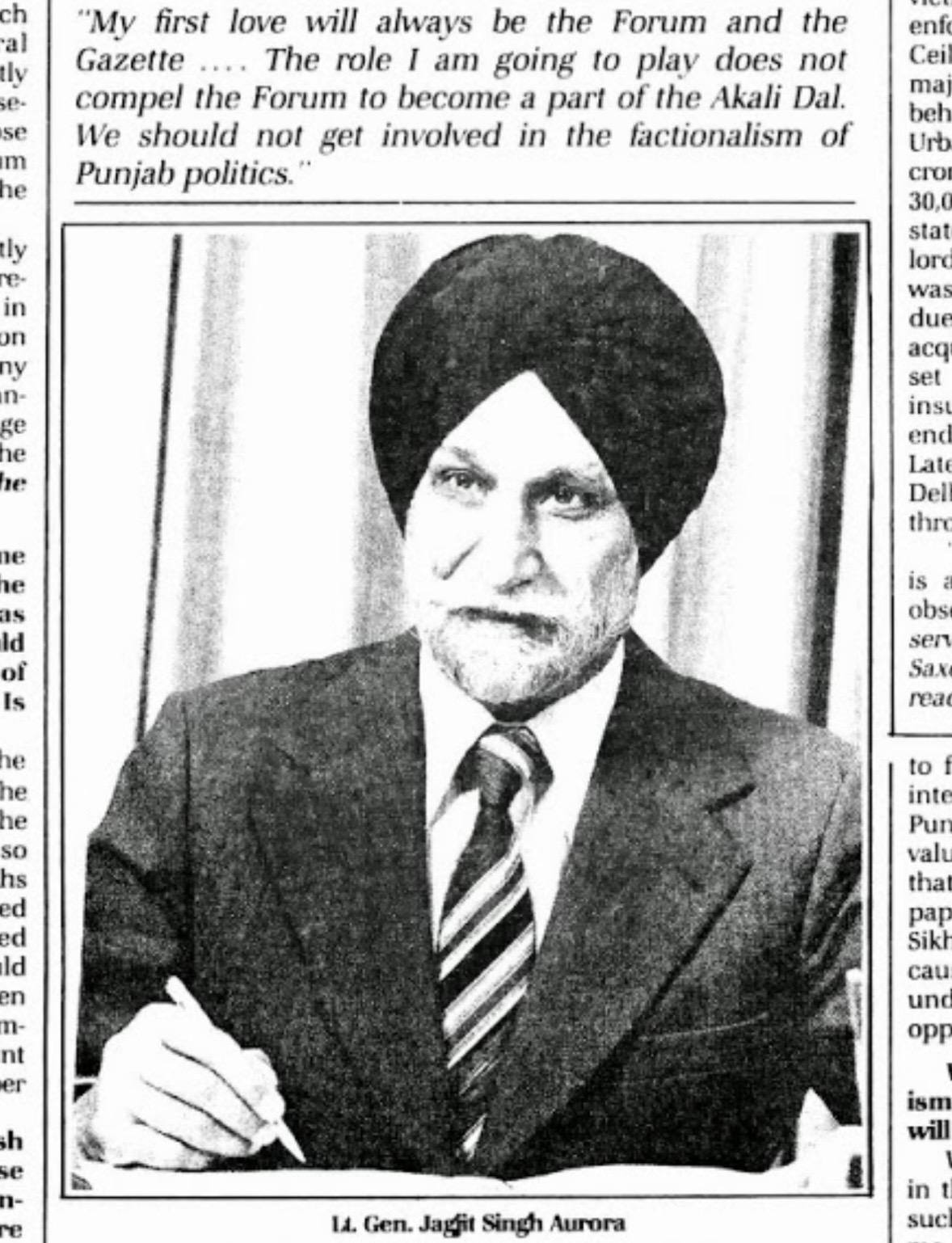
Lt. Gen. Jagjit Singh Aurora about his relation with The Sikh Forum.

=== Cooperation with the Government ===
Maj. Gen. Mohindar Singh Chadha became the next president after the passing of Gen. Aurora. He cooperated with Prime Minister Manmohan Singh and had allowed for a proper national apology from the Indian Government for the anti-Sikh riots along with the convictions of many rioters. Though Manmohan Singh did not help with the convictions much, as most of the perpetrators were of his party. The Forum challenged H.K.L. Bhagat's acquittal in 2003.

=== Cases in judiciary ===
The Sikh Forum through their legal members have often helped in cases and put their own cases, one of the members being the stalwart Harvinder Singh Phoolka. During a Sikh Forum event Justice Anil Dev Singh also asked for fast track cases for the rioters and ceasing of properties of politicians involved. He also pointed out a lapse in a murder case in which the chargesheet against Sajjan Kumar and others never reached the Court.

=== Retrieval of lost heritage ===
Under Pushpindar Singh (founder-editor of the Nishaan Nagaara), the Forum had written many letters to Prime Minister Narendra Modi, in which the government cooperated far more and had given back all the Sikh documents, books and relics stolen from the Golden Temple. This effort was due to prominent member of the Forum, Tarlochan Singh. Though not due to the Forum's efforts alone, the Government did prosecute more than 70 individuals involved with the riots.

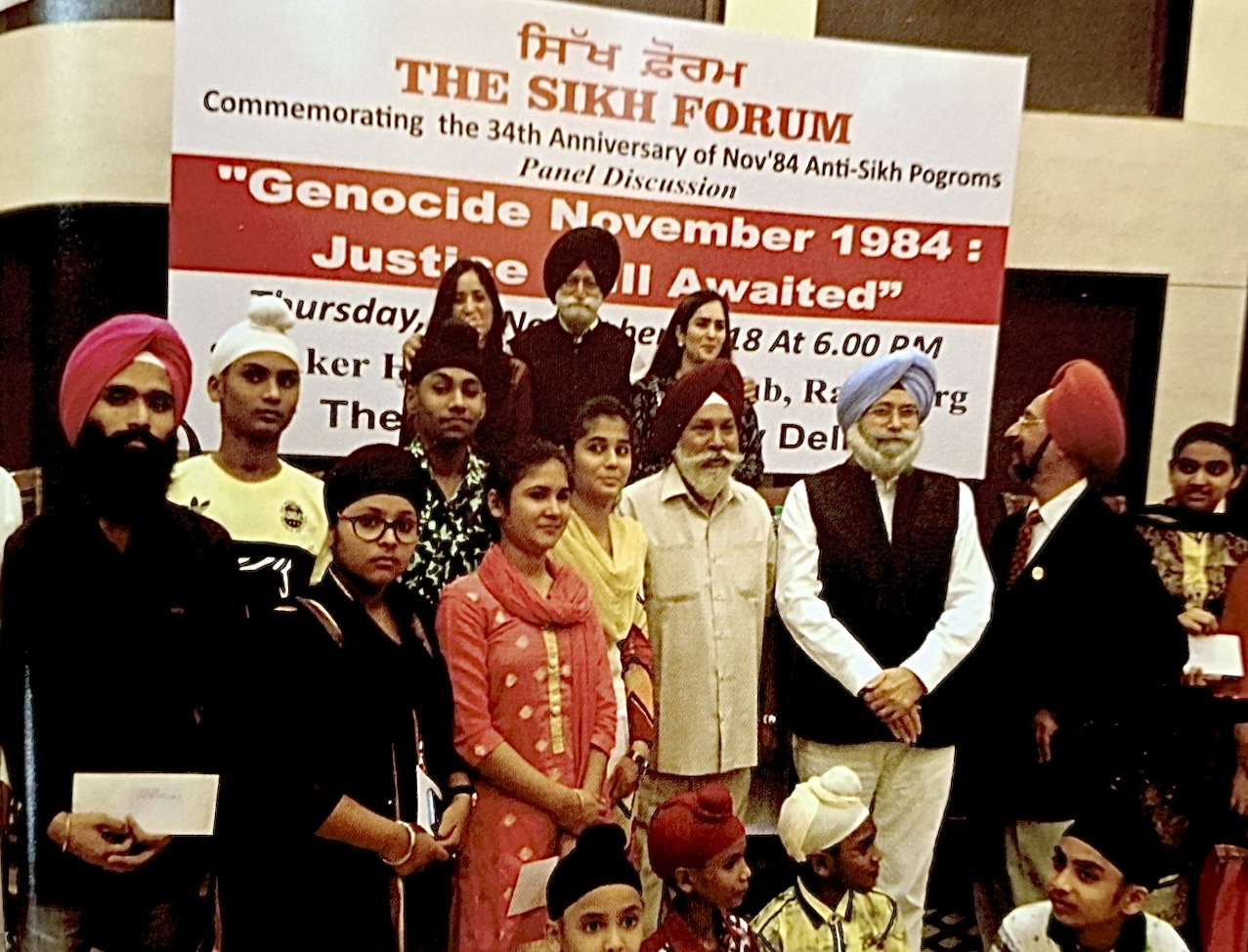
Descendants of the victims of the 1984 anti-Sikh riots with The Sikh Forum; Harvinder Singh Phoolka, D.I.G. Partap Singh and Pushpindar Singh can be seen in the photograph.

=== Truth and Reconciliation Committee ===
Since the first President to the current the Sikh Forum has consistently recommended a Truth and Reconciliation Committee, the Forum was one of the main advocates for consolation for the wounds from 1984 to the end of the Punjab problem, this would also stop any grounds for separatism and any opening of old wounds in the past.

They had also put forward the fact that the Indian Government had not put forward a condolence resolution.

=== Meetings ===
They have two meeting per year, one on the anniversary of Operation Blue Star and one on the anniversary of the anti-Sikh riots, termed as "Sikh Genocide Day" for them; as well as on major festival anniversaries. They usually have their meetings in Delhi, but have historically had them in Kanpur, Chandigarh, Amritsar, Jalandhar and Patiala previously. Their website also has extensive information on the events of Operation Blue Star and the 1984 anti-Sikh riots, some of which was unearthed by them.

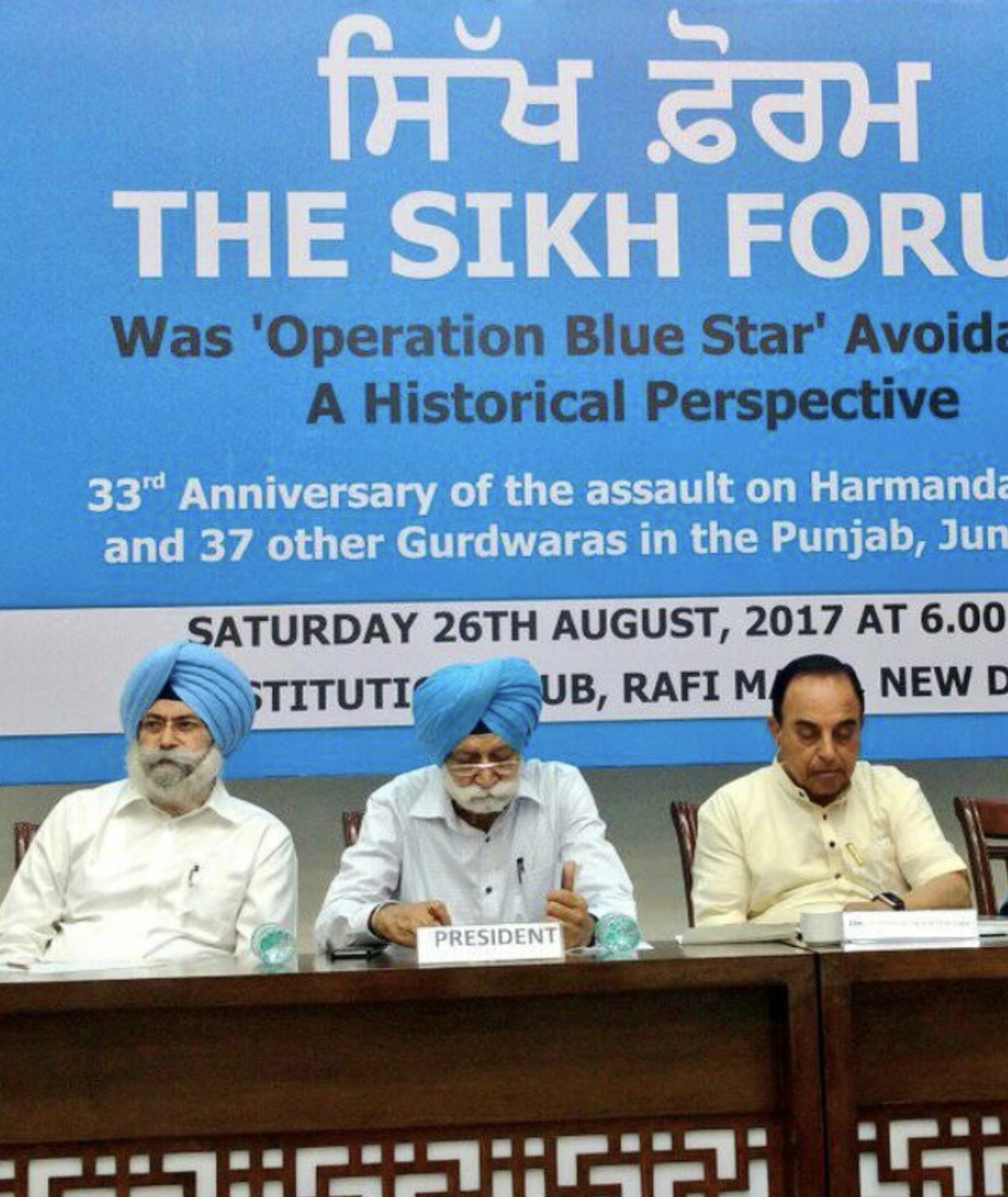
Harvinder Singh Phoolka, Pushpindar Singh and Subramanian Swamy at The Sikh Forum, 33rd Anniversary of Operation Blue Star.

== Organisation ==
=== Presidents ===
No.	Presidents	Time Period	Known For
1.	Lt. Gen. Jagjit Singh Aurora	1985–2004	General during the Liberation of Bangladesh, M.P. in Parliament from the Shiromani Akali Dal.
2.	Dr. Amrik Singh	2004–2009	Author, educationist, founder of Delhi University, South Campus.
3.	Maj. Gen. Mohindar Singh Chadha	2009–2015	Soldier and General in the 1965, 1971 Indo-Pakistan Wars.
4.	Pushpindar Singh	2015–2021	Founder of Vayu Aerospace and Defence Review, prominent aviator.
5.	Ravinder Singh Ahuja	2021–present	Chartered accountant and entrepreneur.

=== Notable members ===
The organisation had a broad list of members; Prime Minister Manmohan Singh, Prime Minister Chandra Shekhar, Prime Minister Inder Kumar Gujral, Capt. Amarinder Singh, Air Marshal Arjan Singh, Lt. Gen. Jagjit Singh Aurora, Khushwant Singh, H.S. Phoolka, Pushpindar Singh, Tarlochan Singh, Kuldip Nayar, Surinder Singh Kohli, Ajmer Singh, Lt. Gen. Arvinder Singh Lamba, Ambassador Krishan Chander Singh, Subramanian Swamy, Farah Naqvi, Maj. Gen. Mohindar Singh Chadha, Brig. Sukhjit Singh, Justice Ranjit Singh Narula, CBI Director Joginder Singh, Sidharth Varadarajan, Ambassador M.P. Singh, Dr. Anup Singh, Ravinder Singh Ahuja, Air Marshal Paramjit Singh Bhangu, D.I.G. Partap Singh, Vice Admiral B.S. Randhawa, Lt. Gen. Dalbir Singh Sidhu, Capt. Lakhinder Singh Bahl, Dr. Amrik Singh, Prof. A.S. Narang and Wng. Cdr. Randhir Singh Chhatwal.
