= Mohindar Singh Chopra =

Indian military officer and ambassador (1907–1990)

Major General Mohindar Singh Chopra
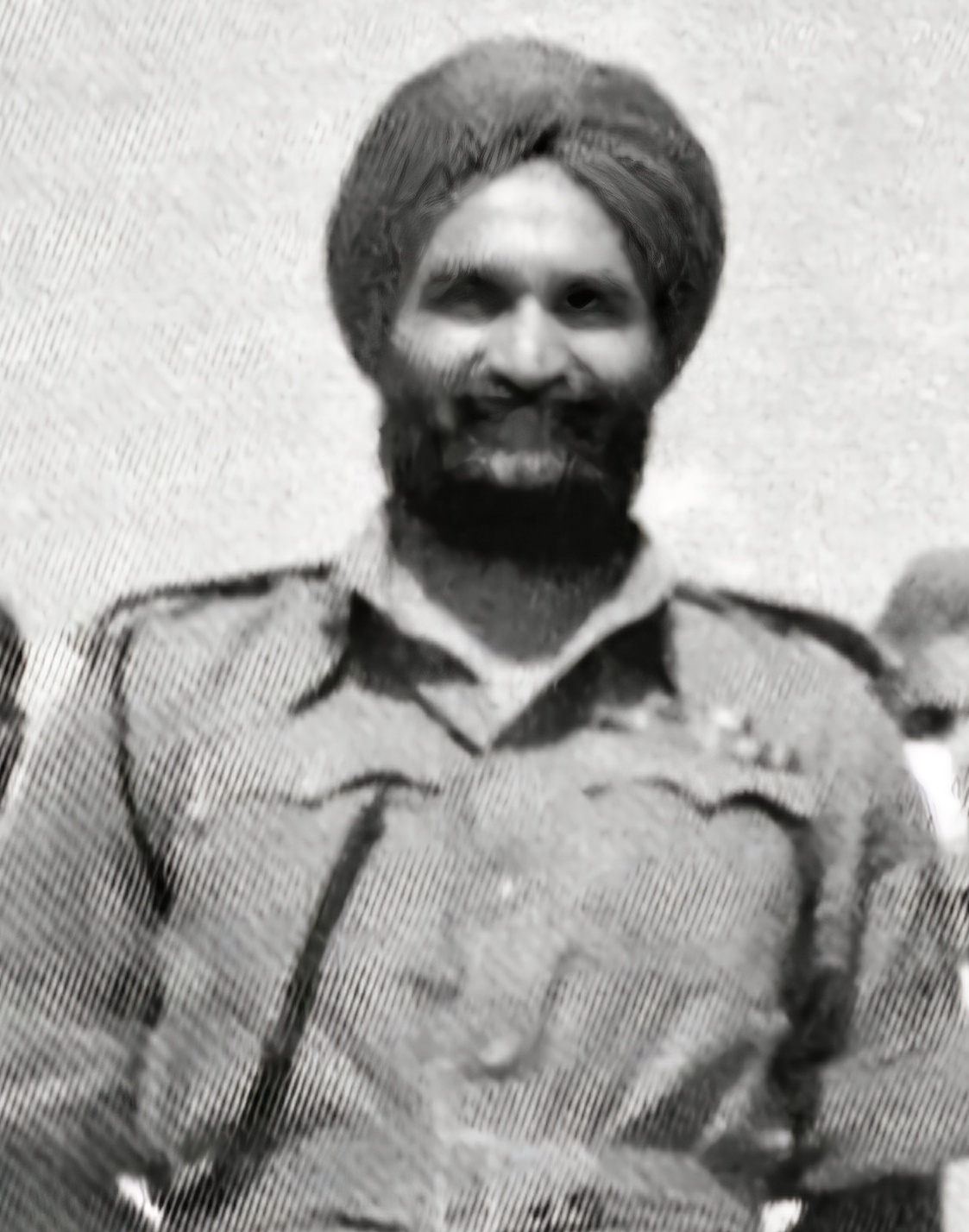
- Maj. Gen. M.S. Chopra at Guru ka Bagh, 1947
- Born: 12, January, 1908; Amritsar, Punjab, British India
- Died: 1990; New Delhi, India
- Relatives: Pushpinder Singh Chopra (son)
- Military career
- Allegiance: British India; India
- Branch: British Indian Army; Indian Army
- Service years: 1928–1956
- Rank: Major General
- Units: Frontier Force Regiment ("Piffers"); Royal Fusiliers; 7th Rajput Regiment; Persia and Iraq Command; Fourteenth Army; Jullundur Brigade; 5th Gurkha Rifles (Frontier Force); Assam Regiment; 20th Infantry Division
- Conflicts: Afghan Civil War (1928-1929); Burma Campaign; Anglo-Iraqi War; North African Campaign; Partition of India; Korean War
- Other work: Ambassador of India to Philippines; Ambassador of India to Taiwan; Director of National Institute of Sports, Patiala

Major General Mohindar Singh Chopra (1907–1990) was an Indian Army General Officer who was known for being in charge of stopping the Partition Riots in both corners of India; Punjab and Bengal. He stopped riots and genocides from taking place through military force.

As the Brigadier he was responsible for a voluntary flow of migration. He had managed to do a referendum in Sylhet, East Pakistan and stopped riots in Amritsar-Lahore along with the rest of Punjab after the Partition of the British Indian Army. His main achievement was the rehabilitation of the partition's refugees and making sure that the Indian Army remained a controlled and orderly force during the times of violent communalism across India. After retirement from the Indian Army he became India's Ambassador to the Philippines. Later, he became Director, National Institute of Sports, Patiala.

== Early life ==
Mohindar Singh Chopra was born to an urban Sikh background in Amritsar, Punjab, British India, he studied at the Khalsa College, Amritsar and at an early age was selected for military training as an 'A' listed recruit in the Prince of Wales Royal Indian Military College, Dehra Dun. Chopra was married to Jagjit Kaur Kapur and they had four children, 2 boys and 2 girls.

== Early Military career ==
=== Training and Sports ===
He qualified for the Army Commission from the Royal Military College, Sandhurst, in 1928. He had joined his first Regiment, the Royal Fusiliers of the British Indian Army, on a year's attachment in 1928. Various professional courses were attended but Mohindar Singh Chopra excelled in army physical training (being a Sandhurst Blue for Athletics) and he was sent for advanced courses to Army School Physical Training, Aldershot in 1938, which included visits to Denmark, Sweden and Germany just before the Second World War broke out.

=== Afghan Civil War ===
He was part of one of the first batches of King’s Commissioned Indian Officers of the Indian Army. His army career progressed steadily, he saw action on the North West Frontier Province with the 1st Battalion, 7th Rajput Regiment at Bannu after which he was posted to his permanent regiment, the 6th Royal Bn, 13th Frontier Force Rifles (Scinde) as part of the elite "Piffer Group", the "Black Puttees" as they were known. They helped to keep the peace on the turbulent North West Frontiers, with their wild and warlike Pathan tribesmen during the course of the Afghan Civil War from 1928 to 1929.

Mohindar Singh Chopra was then transferred to the 1st Rajput's and later became the first Indian to join the 6th Royal Battalion of the 13th Frontier Force Rifles at Hangu in 1932.

== Second World War ==
=== Anglo-Iraqi War ===
After graduating from Staff College, Quetta in 1941 he was sent to the frontlines. He was a part of the British Indian Army Head Command to secure the area from Iraqi rebels, especially the rebel infested region around the Euphrates. The region fell under the indirect occupation of the British Raj at the time hence he administrated and sent communications from Iraq to India under the Persia and Iraq Command (PAI Force).

=== Burma Campaign ===
This phase was short, since he was sent to the Burma front which had the worst fighting between Great Britain and Japan. Mohindar Singh Chopra served with the Fourteenth Army (United Kingdom) on the Assam-Burma front, also known as the Forgotten Army. He was a company commander of a war he raised battalion of the 13 Frontier Force Rifles, operating deep behind Japanese lines during the second phase of the Burma Campaign. He had beaten back the Japanese forces in the Arakan Jungles and was promoted to Lt Colonel by the British Indian Army for his service. His role was also to fight against the Indian National Army, under the Indian Independence League of Subhas Chandra Bose since they were working with the Japanese and trying to get Indians to revolt across the country, though they were militarily unsuccessful.

=== Towards the End of the War ===
He was then sent to North Africa in 1944, although he did not see any military service in the region. He was later rewarded for his services in the British Indian Army by being promoted to Lt. Colonel and becoming the first Indian Commanding Officer of the 1st Assam Regiment in Shillong. He also became Commandant of Army School of Physical Training (1944-1945) and Inspector of Physical Training (1946-1947).

== Partition of India ==
He had the most important responsibility during the Partition of India, to not only defend hundreds of miles of turbulent frontier, but also of evacuating nearly two million refugees safely during the partition of the subcontinent. The British had promoted him to Brigadier before independence and commander of the 123 Indian Infantry Brigade (1947-1949).

=== Partition of Bengal ===
Before Mohindar Singh's entry into Bengal there was no continuity when it came to divisional commanders, hence there were some riots that happened during the time.

In the region of Bengal, there were barely any riots, excepting the Noakhali riots and Direct Action Day, due to the presence of the SYL Force (Sylhet Force) in the area under the overall command of Mohindar Singh Chopra, now a Brigadier. He prevented any riots or armed violence during the Sylhet Referendum despite massive religious tension in the area, as the people were almost equally split between Hindu and Muslim- the former generally wanting to be part of India and the latter Pakistan. The Sylhet Referendum concluded on 6 July 1947 with most of the region joining East Pakistan. He stayed till early September and then left to Delhi where he was given the job to partition the British Indian Army.

During his time in Bengal he had written to Master Tara Singh, Jathedar Mohan Singh Tur and other Akali leaders to keep peace in the area- although they did not listen since there was no army presence. He participated in the last official action of the British Indian Army and the first official action of the Indian Army.

=== Partition of the British Indian Army ===
In Delhi, in September 1947, he had started to chalk out a plan to Partition the British Indian Army into the newly formed Pakistani Army and Indian Army. They settled on the battalions moving from and to India/Pakistan along with the transportation. He also helped Muslims settle in tents in Delhi near Humayun's Tomb and the Red Fort who were all refugees coming in from Uttar Pradesh and mostly East Punjab.

=== Partition of Punjab ===
In Punjab around 800,000 Muslims from East Punjab and the rest of India were killed by Sikh jathas while trying to reach the Western side, whereas around 200,000 Hindus and 50,000 Sikhs also died in riots in, mainly, Pothohar. For three months (October–December) Mohindar Singh Chopra commanded the 123 Indian Infantry Brigade to stop the riots going on in Punjab. He took over command of the brigade at the height of violence from a British Officer-Brigadier Solomons, a highly decorated officer. He was the first Indian to take over the post. Brigadier Solomon had under him three battalions while he was given seven more to look after the border and to protect the refugees.

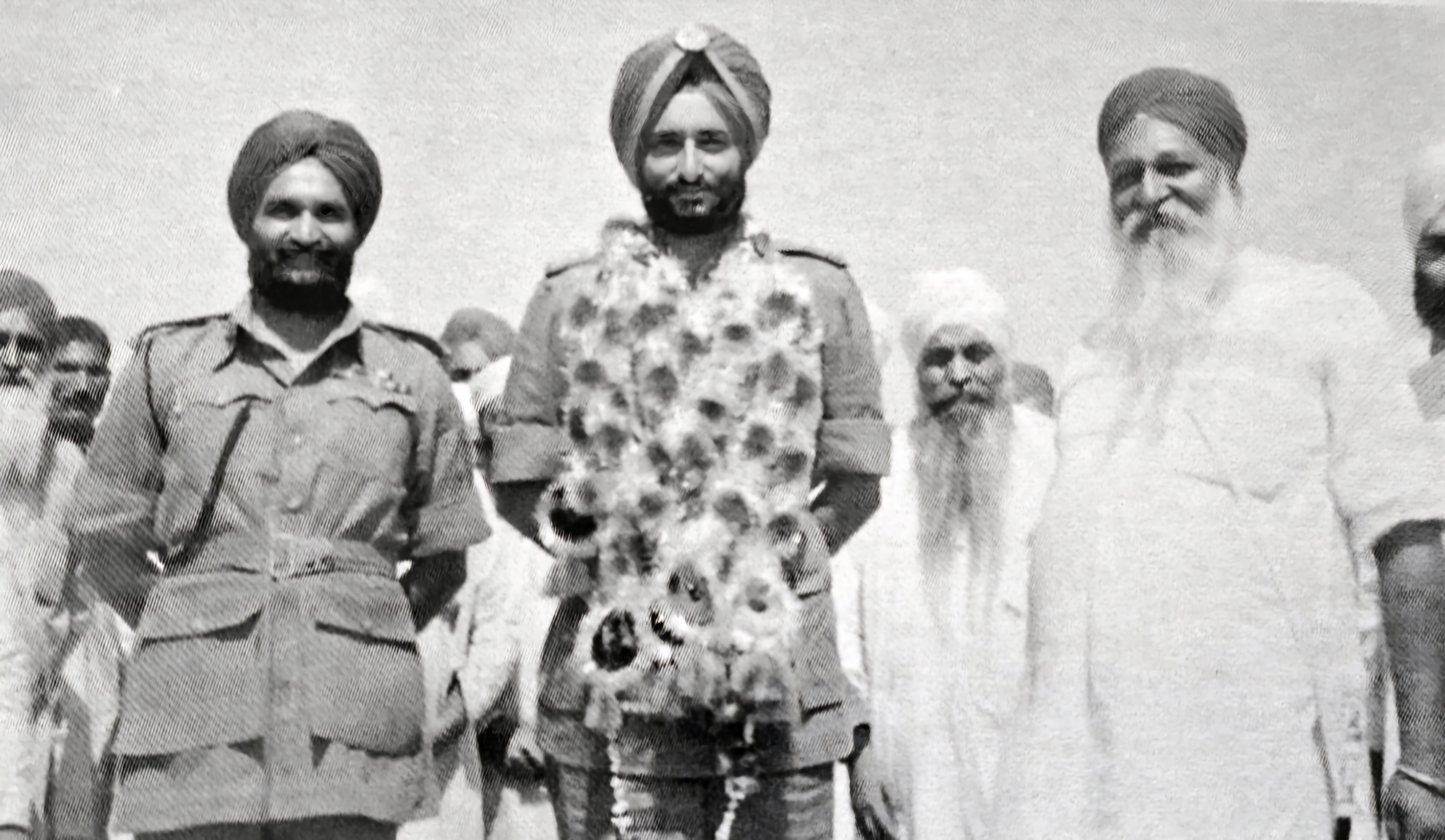
From right to left: Jathedar Udham Singh of Nagoke, Maharaja Yadavindra Singh of Patiala and Maj. Gen. Mohindar Singh Chopra at Guru Ka Bagh, Amritsar (1947).

He was able to set up organized militia to keep peace in localities around the border, the Ajit Dal, Punjab Defence Force, Sher-I-Punjab Dal, Amritsar Raksha Dal, Hindu-Sikh Milap Dal, National Volunteer Corps, Ajit Fauj, Dashmesh Sena, Nalwa Dal, Desh Sevak Sena all did their part to protect the citizens no matter which religion; Muslim, Hindu or Sikh. These, although, were not able to combat the overwhelming Sikh jathas who were organized under the Shiromani Akali Dal, Maharajas of Sikh princely states like Patiala, Faridkot, Kapurthala, Nabha, Kalsia and Jind and local armed Sikhs who formed groups and raided Muslim villages and homes.

==== Amritsar Conflict ====
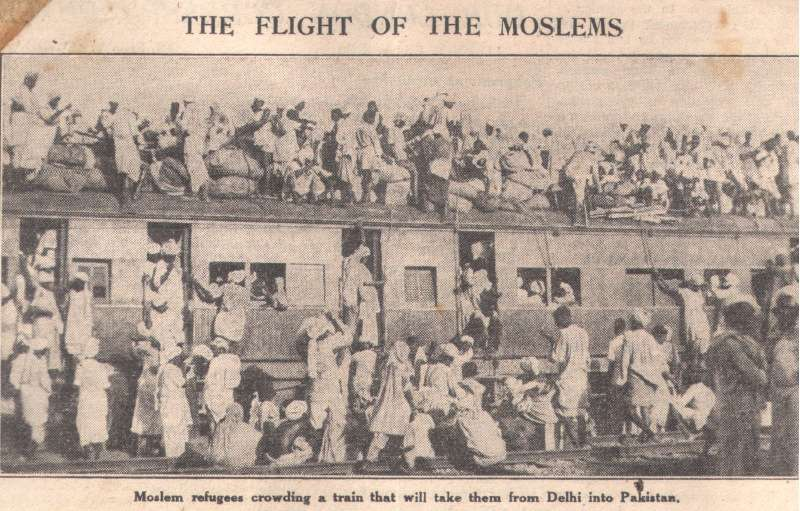
A page from the Manchester Guardian of 'Moslems refugees in a train' from Delhi to Pakistan.

In early October 1947 M.S. Chopra along with his troops, was escorting a large Muslim convoy from Beas to Amritsar. Nearing the camping ground at Amritsar hundreds of Amritsar citizens shouting hysterically waving swords and spears. The situation was explosive, he stood on top of a standing bullock cart and shouted the Sikh war-cry, "Jo Bole So Nihal Sat Sri Akal." He stressed that if they killed the lot of Muslims there would be further retaliation and revenge. He told them two wrongs do not make one right and moreover Prime Minister Jawaharlal Nehru had given explicit instructions that those Muslims who did not want to stay in India, should be allowed to go unmolested. The crowd, miraculously, listened and dispersed.

Every protection and facility was given to the Muslims to proceed to Pakistan without any molestation at all. They were escorted by Indian troops up to Attari border. Every Muslim was given protection after his taking over in September 1947. He had under his command over ten battalions numbering over eight thousand soldiers, including six battalions of Gorkhas.

==== Wagah-Attari Border ====
He and his counterpart and former associate and friend, Brigadier Nasir Ahmad, had devised a plan to create a joint check post to make sure that the border is created. They both founded the famous Wagah-Attari Border which, at that time, was 3 drums on each side and a line of chalk drawn on the Grand Trunk Road. Visitors can still see a plaque at the bottom of the flagstaff at the check post which bears the words: "Foundation stone of this flag staff was laid by Brig Mohindar Singh Chopra on 11th Oct 1947".

"Gentlemen, this is India's North-West border: the most unnatural ever created."

— Brigadier (later Major General) Mohinder Singh Chopra, 12 November 1947, referring to the Radcliffe Line, 1947: A Soldier's Story

==== India's First Border Skirmishes ====
Although, Pakistan, before the 1947 Indo-Pakistan War, also tried to infiltrate East Punjab like they did in Kashmir although he had cleverly foiled their plan by creating check-posts along the border to capture them, there were around fifty Pakistanis who were caught by the Indian Army and sent back to the other side. The first gunshots fired between India to Pakistan was during an incident near the border in the Amritsar district, some journalists were shot at by the Pakistani Army, they were not killed and managed to escape. The Pakistani raiders outnumbered the journalists escort, and hence two platoons from the 2 Bihar under Major Yadhav arrived from Attari and took action and after 4 hours and cleared the pockets occupied by Pakistani troops in Indian territory. It was further disclosed that the raiders belonged to village Thehpur in Pakistan. The East Punjab Police of the Boundary Force chased the raiders and recovered their cattle. The raiders returned with renewed strength. Brigadier Mohindar Singh Chopra took over command of the Police Force, reorganized it, and returned the fire. Lt Col Randhir Singh Grewal was noted to be one of the more competent assistants during the Partition saga.

There was a similar encounter near Qadian on 12 November when Brigadier Mohindar Singh Chopra personally directed operations and recovered improvised anti- personnel land mines and 3 " mortars from the fleeing raiders. With open warfare having broken out in Kashmir the Lahore-Amritsar border was getting restless. On 3 November, large concentrations of Pathans and other tribals at Lahore were reported to be preparing for raiding Amritsar, 3 lorry-loads of Pathans were observed at camping around Wagah, although they were thwarted as reinforcements were placed. During the major chunk of the 1947 Indo-Pakistan War, there was no fighting on the neighboring Punjab front, and he later invited Jawaharlal Nehru for a parade in Gobindgarh Fort, Amritsar to inspire the people that Punjab would be safe, Brigadier Chopra stayed there till October 1949.

During the 1947 Indo-Pakistan War, he moved his Infantry Division to Fazilka to look after that border of the Punjab.

==== Relief Work ====
Hundreds of separated women were rescued by the Indian troops from Pakistan in cross-border operations, under his command (other than Sikhs and Dogra troops) who were not permitted to enter Pakistan just as the entire Baloch Regiment was not allowed to come to India, as they had played havoc in Sheikhupura. When the womenfolk were brought back to safety at Amritsar, some parents were in hysterics at the happy reunion, whilst others refused to accept them back as they had lost their virginity. However, many of the Indian 'jawans' in the army volunteered and married these girls. To rescue the womenfolk he dispatched British officers; a few were under his command, to assist in recovery work. They went deep into Pakistan as far as Dera Ismail Khan, Bannu, Kohat and Peshawar to rescue unfortunate girls.

He formed the Military Evacuee Organisation, Amritsar that came into being on September 1, 1947. He flew with Wing commander Mehar Singh to over-see the caravans of refugees marching from Pakistan to India and drop 'food parcels and cooked chapattis and vegetables in sacks'. He revealed that he sent the belongings of Sir Zaffar Ullah, Pakistani representative at the United Nations from Qadian to Lahore.

== Post-Partition ==
=== 5th Infantry Division ===
He became the first Indian Commandant of the Central ASPT (Ambala-Kasauli). In late 1949 he was promoted to Major General and given the responsibility to resurrect the famous 5th Infantry Division, then scattered along most of North and Eastern India. In 1950 he was given the singular honor of being appointed Colonel-in-Chief of the 5th Royal Gurkhas Rifles (Frontier Force) being then and remaining the senior Piffer in the Sub-Continent. He was the organizer of the Gurkha Centenary in 1958, along with Brigadier Harrison.

=== Korean War ===
The 5th Division was built up into a formidable fighting force and mobilized twice for the Korea War of 1950–53, wherein he represented the Indian Army, they provided medical service and tried restoring diplomatic ties between the two countries, though he did side with the United States of America and South Korea, since China and North Korea were far less open and unsuspecting.

=== 1952 Devon Plane Crash ===
In 1952 the Devon Plane Crash could have wiped out the entire top brass of the Indian Army, although they miraculously survived. Among them were the then GOC-in-C, Western Command, Lt Gen SM Shrinagesh, Maj Gen KS Thimayya, Maj Gen SPP Thorat (later GOC-in-C, Eastern Command), Maj Gen Sardanand Singh, Maj Gen Mohindar Singh Chopra and Brig Ajaib Singh. Shrinagesh, who died in December 1977, wrote, "I gazed out of the cabin window and saw flames coming out of the engine. The plane could explode the moment the fire reached the fuel system." Flt Lt S Biswas was attempting desperately to extinguish the fire when suddenly the plane flipped and plunged down to almost 4,000 feet." In Shrinagesh's own words, "We disembarked from the plane unscathed, apparently in order of precedence, and walked to the nearest village a couple of miles away. We obtained a lift from the village to the main Lucknow road in the only means of conveyance available – a bullock cart!"

=== 20th Indian Division ===
In 1953 he took over as GOC 20th Infantry Division, the last Division to have troops stationed in Tibet before the Chinese invasion there. Major General Mohindar Singh Chopra retired from the Indian Army in 1955.

== Post-Military career ==
=== Ambassador Philippines ===
He became the first Ambassador from India to the Philippines and held the position till 1959. Due to his arrival, for the first time, the Cabinet meeting was held in the Malacañang state dining hall. For a short time he became the Ambassador to Taiwan as well in the 1960s. Around half of all Indians in the Philippines were Sikhs, and most of them shaven.

=== Director of Sports, Patiala ===
After a few years of civilian life, from 17 July 1964 to 30 April 1967 he was Director of National Institute of Sports in Patiala.

=== Later life ===
In 1988 he was invited to Manchester where he formed the Jullundur Brigade Association between India (5th Battalion, Sikh Regiment), Pakistan (1st Battalion the Frontier Force Regiment) and Great Britain (1st Battalion, Kings Regiment).

"There is something unique and central in the faiths that the men in arms professed- to have been made incumbent upon men of different religions (Christian, Sikh, Hindu) to have lived, fought and died together."

— Major General Mohinder Singh Chopra about the Jullundur Brigade, Jullundur Brigade Book

== Death ==
He died in New Delhi at the age of 84.

== Legacy ==
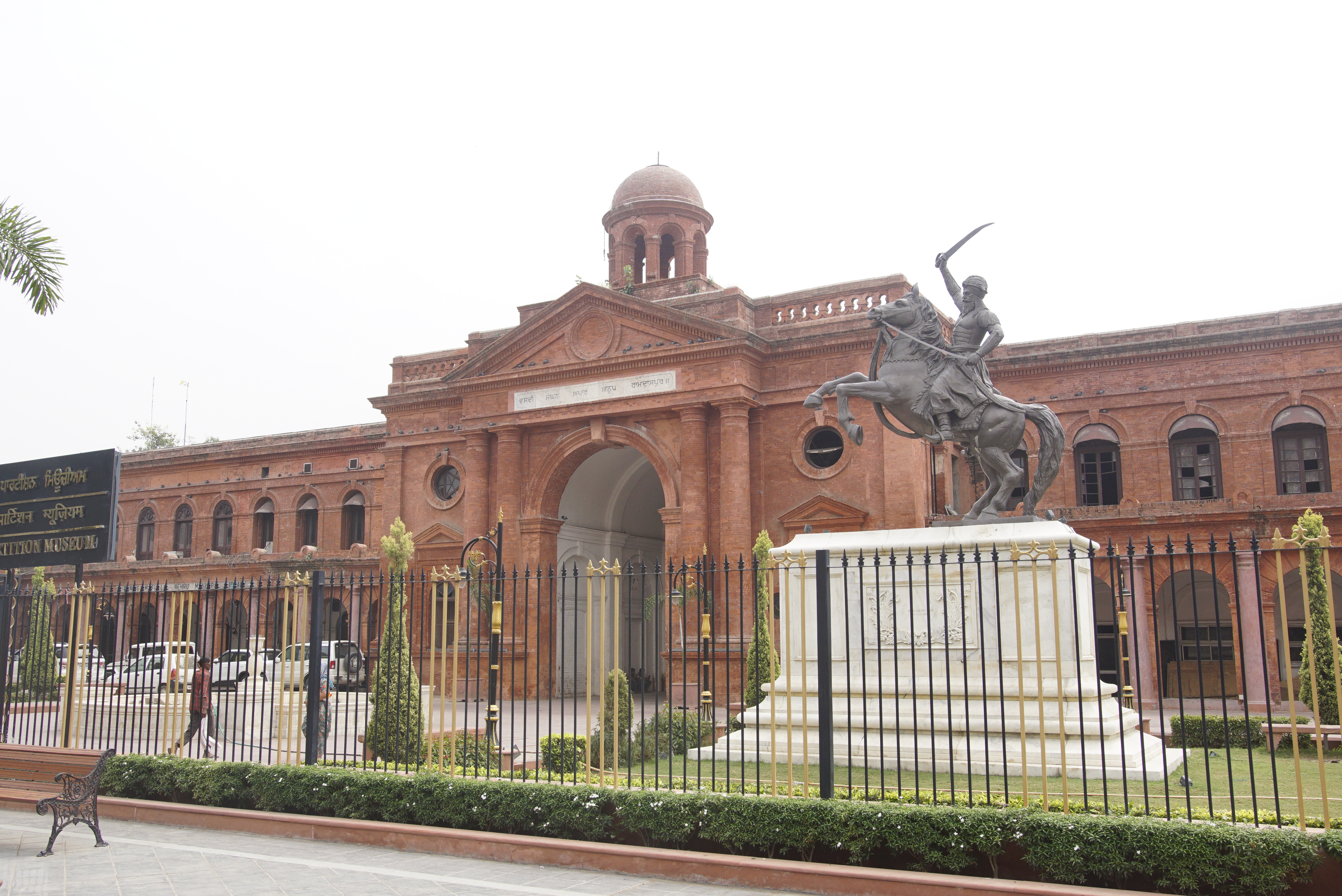
Partition Museum, Amritsar.

His memoirs were collected and published with explanations by his son, famous aviator Pushpindar Singh Chopra in '1947: A Soldiers' Story' which depicted the military side of the Partition of India.

Some of his relics are currently on public display in the Town Hall Partition Museum, Amritsar.

There is a 'Clock Tower' in Kasauli, Himachal Pradesh with an inscription in commemoration, presented by his family for being the first Indian Station Commander of Kasauli Cantt.

On the Wagah-Attari Border, Amritsar the name of Mohindar Singh Chopra along with his Pakistani counterpart Nazir Ahmed are written on their respective flags.

== See also ==
- Sam Manekshaw
- Jagjit Singh Aurora
