= Jagjit Singh Aurora =

Indian military officer (1916–2005)

Lieutenant General Jagjit Singh Aurora PVSM
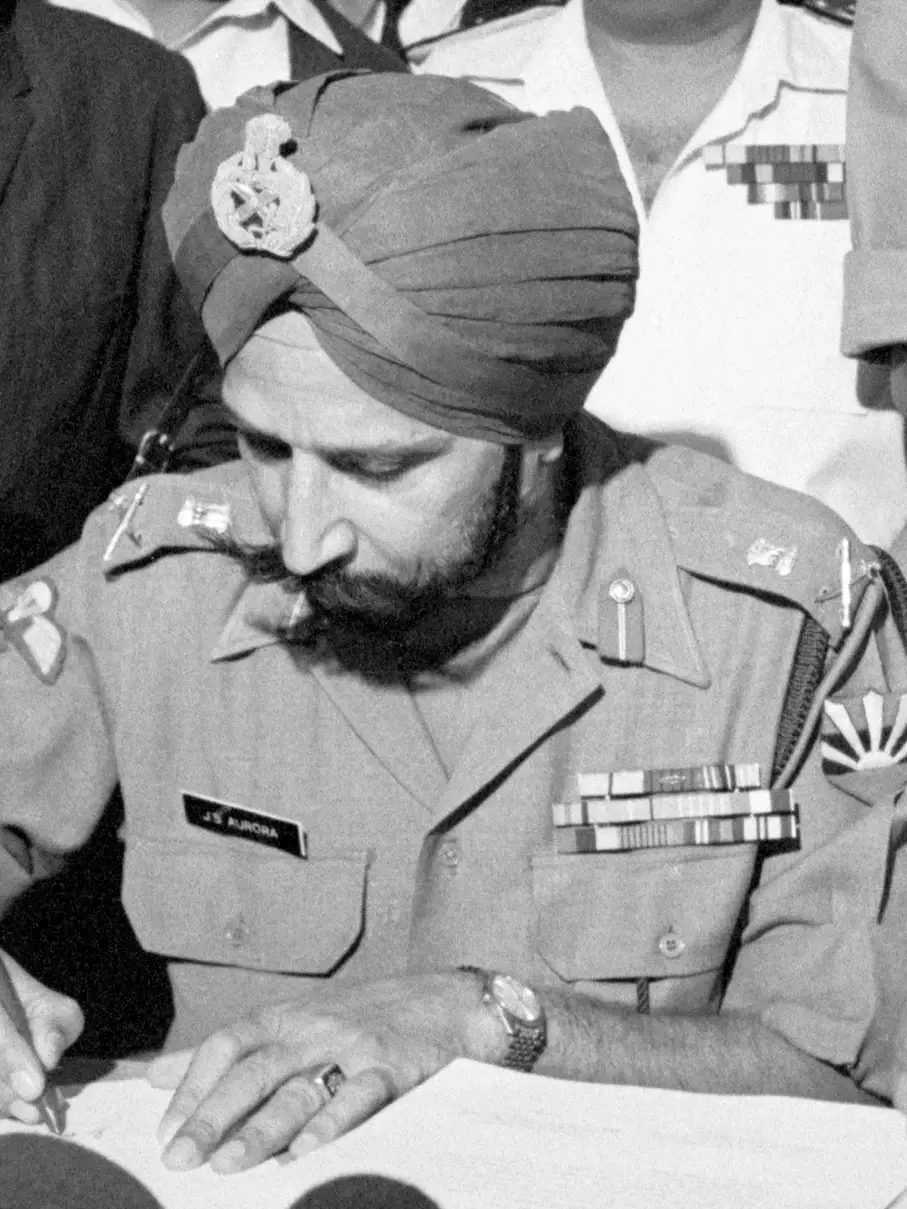
- Aurora in 1971
- Born: 13 February 1916; Kala Gujran, Jhelum District, Punjab, British India (now in Punjab, Pakistan)
- Died: 3 May 2005 (aged 89); New Delhi, India
- Education: Indian Military Academy
- Military career
- Allegiance: British India (1939–1947); India (1947–1973)
- Branch: British Indian Army; Indian Army
- Service years: 1939–1973
- Rank: Lieutenant General
- Service number: IC-214
- Units: 2nd Punjab Regiment (until 1947); Punjab Regiment (after 1947)
- Commands: Eastern Army
- Conflicts: World War II; Burma Campaign; Indo-Pakistani War of 1947; Sino-Indian War; Indo-Pakistani War of 1965; Nathu La and Cho La clashes; Bangladesh Liberation War
- Awards: Param Vishisht Seva Medal; Padma Bhushan; Mentioned in dispatches

Lieutenant General Jagjit Singh Aurora (or Arora), PVSM (Note: Both spellings are used in official documents; though "Aurora" predominates in the listings in the pre-Independence Indian Army List, as do those in the Gazette of India.) (13 February 1916 (Note: As given in the pre-Independence Indian Army List.) – 3 May 2005) was an Indian senior military officer who was the General Officer Commanding-in-Chief (GOC-in-C) Eastern Command during the Bangladesh Liberation War and the Indo-Pakistani War of 1971. He organised and led the ground forces campaign in the Eastern Front of the war, which led to an overwhelming defeat of the combined Pakistan Armed Forces in East-Pakistan that led to the creation of Bangladesh.

As the General commanding the Indian and Bangladesh Forces in the Eastern theater, Gen Aurora received the surrender from the Governor of East Pakistan and Commander of the Eastern Command of the Pakistan Army, Lt Gen A. A. K. Niazi.

After retirement from the Indian Army, he joined Akali Dal and served as a Member of Parliament in the Rajya Sabha. He was also the Founder-President of The Sikh Forum.

== Early life ==
Jagjit Singh Aurora was born to an Arora Khatri Sikh family in Kala Gujran, Jhelum District, Punjab, British India. His father was an engineer. He was married to Bhagwant Kaur, she accompanied him to the Pakistani Instrument of Surrender in Dhaka. The couple had two children, Anita Kaur and Kiranjit Singh.

== Army career ==
Aurora graduated from the Indian Military Academy in 1939 and was commissioned into the 1st Battalion, 2nd Punjab Regiment on 1 February. He saw action in the Burma Campaign during World War II.

After Independence and the ensuing Partition of India, he opted to join the Indian Army. As a lieutenant colonel commanding 1 (Para) Battalion in the Punjab Regiment, he was mentioned in dispatches during the Indo-Pakistani War of 1947. On 3 February 1957, he was promoted acting Brigadier and given command of an infantry brigade.

In May 1961, as BGS XXXIII Corps, Brigadier Aurora led a team of military officers and men sent by the Government of India on a reconnaissance mission to Bhutan. This later led to the establishment of the Indian Military Training Team in Bhutan.

As a brigadier, he fought in the Sino-Indian War in 1962 and again in 1967. He was appointed a division commander on 21 February 1963, with a promotion to the rank of Major General on 20 June 1964. He was then appointed Director of Military Training (DMT) on 23 November 1964. He also participated in the Indo-Pakistani War of 1965.

On 6 June 1966, Aurora was appointed Deputy Chief of the Army Staff (DCOAS) with the acting rank of Lieutenant General, and was promoted substantive Lieutenant General on 4 August. He was then given command of a General Officer Commanding (GOC) of a corps on 27 April 1967. On 8 June 1969, he was appointed the General Officer Commanding-in-Chief (GOC-in-C) Eastern Command.

=== East Pakistan ===
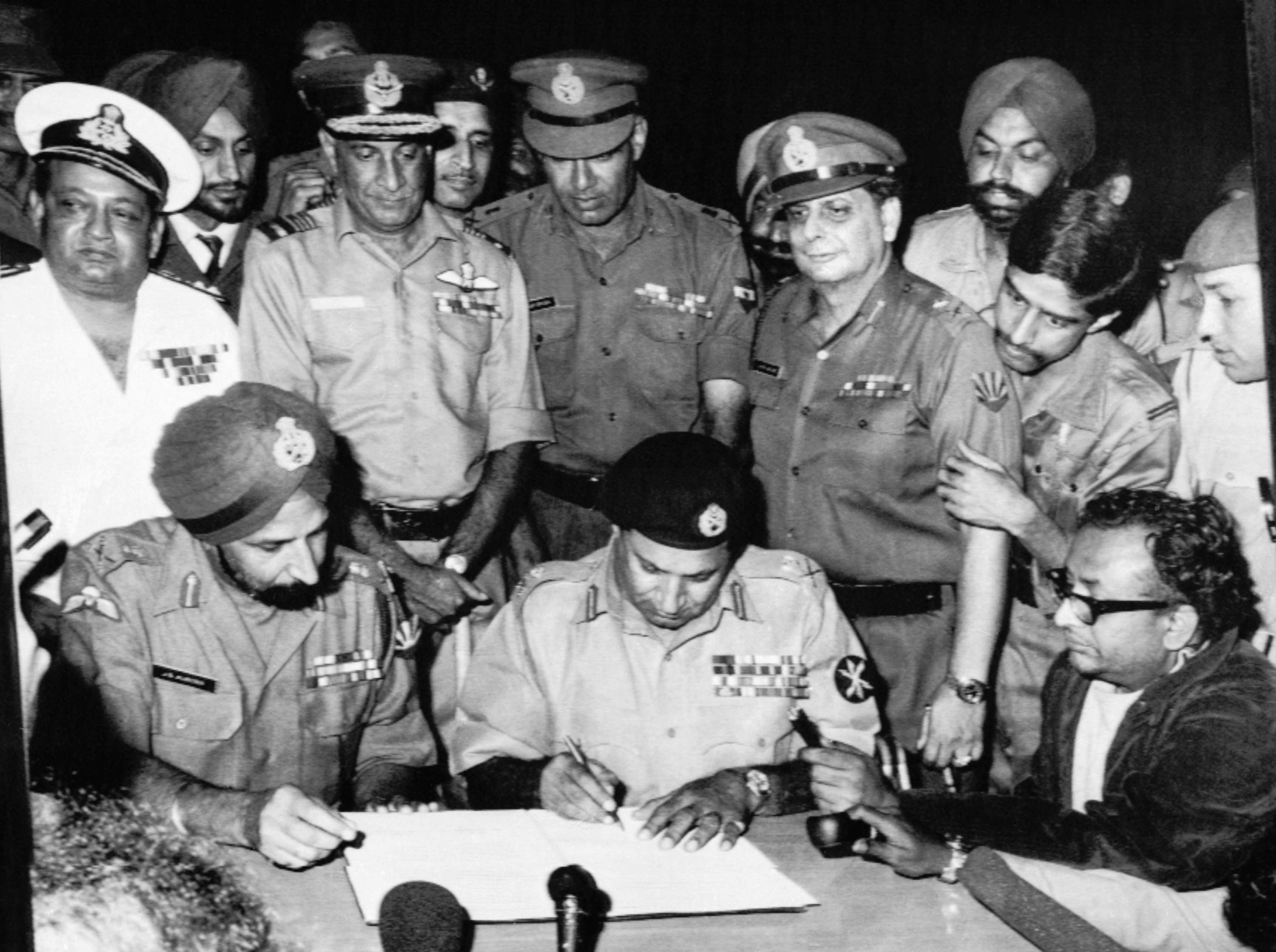
Lt. Gen A. A. K. Niazi, Commanding Officer of Pakistan Army forces in East Pakistan signing the instrument of surrender on 16 December 1971 in the presence of Lt. Gen. Aurora

In March 1971, the Pakistan Army launched Operation Searchlight to curb the Bengali nationalist movement in East Pakistan. The operation resulted in commencement of the Bangladesh Liberation War which resulted in the Bangladesh genocide, including the systematic murder of Bengali intellectuals by the Pakistan Army. The ensuing violence led to almost 10 million Bengali refugees fleeing from East Pakistan into India. Under the command of General M. A. G. Osmani a Bangladeshi military force, the Mukti Bahini, was formed. Consisting of Bengali defectors from the Pakistan Army and guerrilla fighters, it engaged in hostilities with the Pakistani Army.

For the next nine months, with tensions escalating between India and Pakistan and anticipating possible hostilities, Aurora oversaw the logistical preparations of the Indian Army on the Eastern front, including the improvement of roads, communications and bridges, as well as the movement of 30,000 tons of supplies close to the border with East Pakistan.

At the outbreak of the war on 3 December 1971, the Eastern Army Commander, Gen. Aurora oversaw the Indian ground forces into battle in East Pakistan. Forces under Aurora's command, in a meticulously planned operation, formed numerous small combat teams and launched a four-front attack with the strategy of confronting and defeating Pakistani forces on selected fronts, while bypassing them on others. In less than two weeks, his forces advanced from the Indian border to capture Dhaka, the capital of East Pakistan.

The Unified Commander of Pakistan Armed Forces's Eastern Military High Command, Lieutenant General Amir Abdullah Khan Niazi was forced to sign an instrument of unconditional surrender. View: Instrument of Surrender. The photograph of Niazi and Aurora at the signing of the Instruments of Surrender became an iconic image of the war, with The Guardian describing the scene as "the glum Pakistani officer bowed over his signature. The turbaned figure beside him, showing not a scrap of elation". The 90,000 Pakistani troops under Niazi's command surrendered to Gen Aurora as prisoners of war in what remains to date the largest surrender of soldiers since the Second World War. Pakistan lost almost 57,000 square miles (150,000 km^{2}) of its territory and 70 million of its people to the newly formed nation of Bangladesh.

== Later life ==
Aurora was honoured with the Param Vishisht Seva Medal, the Padma Bhushan and the Bir Protik for his role in the war. He retired from the Indian Army in 1973. Lt Gen JFR Jacob has written in his book An Odyssey in War And Peace that Gen. Aurora approached then Prime Minister Indira Gandhi for governorship of a state but she declined. Jacob also writes that Gen. and Mrs. Aurora were a regular part of the social life of Calcutta.

=== The Sikh Forum ===
In 1984, Aurora fiercely criticised the Indian National Congress leadership following Operation Blue Star, which was an operation by the then government of flushing out armed Sikh militants who had taken up positions inside the Golden Temple in Amritsar but also caused extensive damage to the holiest shrine of Sikhism. He became the first President of The Sikh Forum, which he formed with the help of many Sikhs in Delhi and Punjab to represent and fight for the rights of Sikhs. As part of the Sikh Forum he had done hunger strikes, protests, written open letters and made regular speeches till he passed, in 2004 Dr. Amrik Singh became the next President.

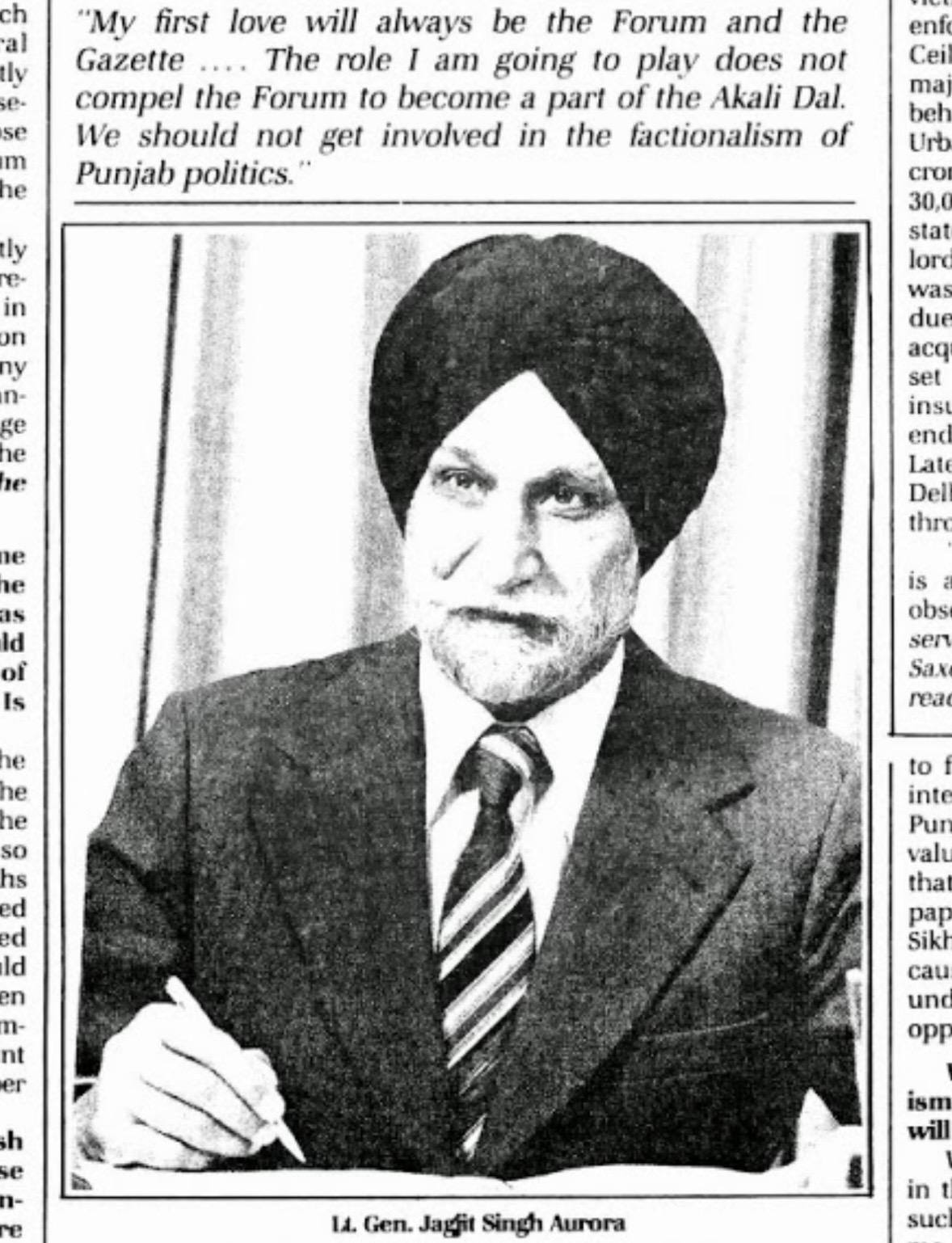
Lt. Gen. Jagjit Singh Aurora about his relation with The Sikh Forum.

==== Arrest ====
In 1993 Jagjit Singh Aurora had courted arrest as The Sikh Forum had staged a protest wherein journalist Rajinder Singh Pun, SAD (Amritsar) Delhi President Mohindar Singh and Janata Dal national secretary Ramvir Singh Bidhuri all courted arrest. The next year he had staged another protest at India Gate as well.

=== Member of Parliament ===
Subsequently, he spent several years as a member of parliament in the Rajya Sabha, the upper House of the Indian Parliament, for the Shiromani Akali Dal, a political party. Aurora was also an active member of the Citizen's Justice Committee which provided pro bono assistance to Sikh victims of the 1984 anti-Sikh riots.

== Death ==
Jagjit Singh Aurora died on 3 May 2005, at age 89, in New Delhi. He was survived by a son and a daughter. After his death, the gratitude of Bangladesh to General Aurora was emphasized in a message to India, from Morshed Khan, the Bangladeshi Foreign Minister, stating: "Aurora will be remembered in the history of Bangladesh for his contribution during our war of liberation in 1971, when he led the allied forces."

The site of the Pakistani surrender, where Lt. Gen. Niazi signed the Instrument of Surrender with Lt. Gen. Aurora on 16 December 1971 has been converted into a national monument Swadhinata Stambha. The main attraction is the glass Stambha which is built on the precise location where the instrument of surrender was signed. The monument also includes an eternal flame, terracotta murals of martyrs and a body of water.

== Dates of rank ==
Insignia	Rank	Component	Date of rank
	Second Lieutenant	British Indian Army	1 February 1939
	Lieutenant	British Indian Army	30 January 1940
	Captain	British Indian Army	22 February 1940 (acting); 5 February 1941 (temporary); 1 May 1942 (war-substantive); 30 January 1946 (substantive)
	Major	British Indian Army	1 February 1942 (acting); 1 May 1942 (temporary)
	Captain	Indian Army	15 August 1947 (Note: Upon independence in 1947, India became a Dominion within the British Commonwealth of Nations. As a result, the rank insignia of the British Army, incorporating the Tudor Crown and four-pointed Bath Star ("pip"), was retained, as George VI remained Commander-in-Chief of the Indian Armed Forces. After 26 January 1950, when India became a republic, the President of India became Commander-in-Chief, and the Ashoka Lion replaced the crown, with a five-pointed star being substituted for the "pip.")
	Captain	Indian Army	26 January 1950 (recommissioning and change in insignia)
	Major	Indian Army	26 February 1950 (temporary); 30 January 1951 (substantive)
	Lieutenant-Colonel	Indian Army	30 January 1952
	Colonel	Indian Army	1 August 1958
	Brigadier	Indian Army	3 February 1957 (acting); 1962 (substantive)
	Major General	Indian Army	21 February 1963 (acting); 20 June 1964 (substantive)
	Lieutenant-General	Indian Army	6 June 1966 (acting); 4 August 1966 (substantive)

== See also ==
- Undivided India
- Sam Manekshaw
- Bangladesh Liberation War

== Notes ==
Military offices
Preceded by Kunhiraman Palat Candeth	Deputy Chief of the Army Staff; 1966–1967	Succeeded by Gopal Gurunath Bewoor
Preceded by Sam Manekshaw	General Officer Commanding-in-Chief Eastern Command; 1969–1973	Succeeded by N. C. Rawlley
