= Ajmer, Gujarat =

Village in Gujarat, India

Coordinates: 22.22831765°N 71.24272453°E

Ajmer is a village in Jasdan Taluka of Rajkot district in Gujarat, India.

== History ==
It was formerly a separate tribute-paying state before it fell under Navanagar State. This occurred between 1807 and 1821, during which time the Gaekwad was paramount in Saurashtra. It is about twelve miles south of Chotila. The Mulgrasias of Ajmer were Khachar Kathis.
