= Tarlochan Singh =

Indian politician (born 1933)

Member Rajya Sabha
- In office 1 August 2004 – 31 July 2010

Chairman National Commission for Minorities
- In office March 2003 – March 2006
- Preceded by: Justice Mohd. Shameem
- Succeeded by: Mr. Hamid Ansari

Vice-Chairman National Commission for Minorities
- In office January 2000 – February 2003

Chairman Delhi Tourism
- In office 1997–1999

Managing Director Delhi Tourism
- In office 1987–1993

Press Secretary to President of India
- In office 1983–1987

Personal details
- Born: 28 July 1933 (age 93) Dhudial, Punjab, British India
- Party: Independent
- Spouse: Uttamjit Kaur
- Children: 3
- Education: Panjab University, Chandigarh
- Profession: Former Civil Servant, Civil Service, Public Relations (Tourism)

S. Tarlochan Singh (born 28 July 1933) is an Indian politician. He is a former member of the Parliament of India, representing Haryana. He served as Chairman of the National Commission for Minorities from 2003 to 2006 (Union Cabinet of India cabinet minister status) and was a member of the National Human Rights Commission of India.

He made efforts for the rescue and settlement of sikhs from Afghanistan after the civil war. He published calendars and developed museums on Sikh history. He has traveled worldwide to educate people about the teachings and values of Sikhism. In 2008, he visited Maine in the United States to give lectures on Sikhism at Colby College. He was awarded India's third highest civilian award the Padma Bhushan in 2021.

== Childhood and education ==
Tarlochan Singh was born on 28 July 1933, to Shmt. Ram Piari and S. Balwant Singh in Dhudial, Punjab (now in Chakwal District, Pakistan). He is the eldest amongst three siblings. He attended early schooling at Khalsa School at Dhudial and then moved to Patiala at the time of the Partition in 1947. For some time, he had to work along with his studies. He went to the Panjab University, Chandigarh to study economics and attained his master's degree in 1955. He is an alumnus of Mohindra College of Patiala.

== Early career ==
After completing his master's degree in economics, Singh started his career in civil service as Public Relations Officer in Punjab. He served as Joint Secretary, Development, Punjab Markfed from 1972 to 1977. He then served as a joint director of the Public Relations Department in 1977 and served in this position until 1980. He was an additional director of the Department of Tourism, Culture, Museum and Archaeology for the Government of Punjab from 1980 to 1982. He served as director of the Publicity and Public Relations of the IXth Asian Games Organising Committee for New Delhi from 1982 to 1983.

During his stint as managing director of Delhi Tourism, he developed two Delhi tourist sites: Dilli Haat and Hauz Khaz Tourist Complex.

== Work done as Member Parliament Rajya Sabha ==
- He is the first Sikh MP who has moved a bill in the Parliament to amend Section 25 of Indian constitution, this is where the Sikhs have been described as part of Hindus. The amendment is to seek independent status for the Sikhs as a separate religion. This bill came twice on the agenda for discussion but due to disturbance it could not be debated. This is still pending for discussion.
- He moved an amendment in the Anand Marriage Act which was passed in 1908. There is no provision in this act of registration of Sikh marriages. Now Sikhs are getting registration certificates under Hindu Marriage Act. The Parliamentary Committee on law & justice has already approved the proposal. Law Minister has made assurance in the Rajya Sabha of getting this bill passed at earliest. This will be a major step towards officially recognizing the Sikhism as a separate religion.
- In the constitutional review commission he appeared as a Sikh representative & on his plea the commission had recommended the necessary amendment in Section 25 of Indian Constitution.
- He made efforts to get approval to upgrade Chandigarh Domestic Airport to International airport from Parliament.
- He got sanction for Maharaja Ranjit Singh's statue in Parliament complex & Rs. 25 Lakhs payment was made by Shri Atal Bihari Vajpayee, then Prime Minister.
  - It was his efforts that Rajya Sabha took a decision of installing the Statue of Shahid Bhagat Singh in the Parliament.

== Accomplishments ==
- As Chairman of the National Commission for Minorities
  - He got maximum facilities for refugees from Afghanistan. He got them permissions to travel to India from US & UK & also got special papers issued for working in India.
  - He got a bill passed in Haryana Assembly for granting second language status to Punjabi in 2004 by Shri Om Prakash Chautala. On his request a meeting was held in Home Ministry in 2004 which was presided by Shri L.K.Advani & Punjabi & Urdu were granted second language status in Delhi.
  - He got visas to hundreds of Sikhs who were in the black list in Canada, US & UK. He has been advocating for abolishing the black list.
  - After Kargil war in 1999 all movements between India & Pakistan were stopped. He got sanction of the Sikh Jattha to go for pilgrimage from the Prime Minister.
  - He brought sanction for the Sikhs living in Pakistan to come to India for pilgrimage as a group. This was not allowed for fifty years.
  - It was his efforts that Government of India honored Air Chief Marshal Arjan Singh DFC with the title of Marshal of the Air Force. Field Marshal Madappa Cariappa OBE and Sam Manekshaw were the only other field marshals in the history of India.(Marshal of the Air Force, Marshal of the Fleet and Field Marshal are highest ranks of IAF, Indian Navy and Army awarded for the lifetime to the retired Chiefs of the Services for exceptional service to the nation. only 03 officer were awarded this five star general rank in the history of India)
  - He intervened as Chairman National Commission for Minorities when there was a move to form Defense services supreme counsel in 2004. By this move General Joginder Jaswant Singh, popularly known as J.J. Singh would have retired as lieutenant general. He succeeded in obtaining consent of the prime minister to scuttle the move. General J.J. Singh was promoted as Army Chief subsequently.
- As chairman and managing director of the Delhi Tourism and Transportation Development Corporation
  - Developed Hauz Khas Tourist Complex
  - Dilli Haat.
  - Started annual festivals in Delhi
    - Qutub Festival.
    - International Mango Festival.
    - Garden Festival.
- As the Additional Director, Department of Tourism, Culture, Museum and Government of Punjab.
  - Established the Guru Teg Bahadur Museum in Anandpur Shahib in 1978.
  - The Maharaja Ranjit Singh Museum Amritsar in 1980.
  - Shaheed Bhagat Singh Museum in Khatkar Kalan in 1988.
- As Director Public Relations Department.
  - He acquired a lithograph of Golden Temple, Amritsar – 1834 from London & got published from Public Relation Department, Punjab in 1978. This picture is displayed all over the world in Sikh houses.
  - He brought about 20 Sikh Relics from Victoria Museum, London for display in Amritsar in 1980.
- As Director Markfed, Government of Punjab
  - Published the first Sikh art calendar in 1971. The second calendar in 1972 on Sikh Martyrs was banned by the Parliament but later on was allowed to be released. SGPC copied this calendar for worldwide distribution.
  - He organized special editions of the Marg magazine edited by Mulk Raj Anand, the world-famous writer. One issue was on Amritsar, and the second on Maharaja Ranjit Singh.
  - He prepared a catalogue of Sikh Relics lying in UK in 1975 with the help of Dr. W.C. Archer, who was responsible for locating Guru Gobind Singh's arms in 1966 in UK.

== Posts held ==
- Joint Secretary, Development, Punjab MARKFED (largest cooperative organization in Asia) (1970–77).
- Joint Director, Public Relations Department (1977–1980).
- Additional Director, Department of Tourism, Culture, Museum and Archaeology, Government of Punjab (1980–1982).
- Director, Publicity and Public Relations of IXth Asian Games Organising Committee, New Delhi (1982–1983).
- Press Secretary to President of India (1983–1987).
- Managing Director, Delhi Tourism Development Corporation (1987–1993).
- Advisor, Tourism, Government of India (1993–1994).
- Chairman, Delhi Tourism and Transportation Development Corporation (1997–1999).
- Vice-Chairman, National Commission for Minorities (2000–2003).
- Member, National Commission on Population (2003–2005).
- Chairman, National Commission for Minorities, Government of India (with the status of Union Cabinet Minister) (2003–2006).
- Ex-Officio Member, National Human Rights Commission (2003–2006).
- Member Rajya Sabha (2004 – present)
  - Member, Committee on Social Justice and Empowerment Member, General Purposes Committee (August, 2004 to October 2006).
  - Member, Consultative Committee for the Ministry of Civil Aviation (October 2004 – Present)
  - Member, Committee of Privileges (December, 2005 to August, 2006).
  - Member, Joint Parliamentary Committee on Food Management in Parliament House Complex (April 2006 – Present).
  - Member, Parliamentary Forum on Population and Public Health (May, 2006 – present).
  - Member, Committee on Personnel, Public Grievances, Law and Justice Member, Committee on Papers Laid on the Table (October, 2006 – present).
  - Member, The Sikh Forum.

== Bibliography ==
- Narian Tahia Itihas
- Saajan Des Videshre
