= Ajmer Singh (author) =

Sikh political thinker and author

Ajmer Singh (born 1948) is a Sikh political thinker and author in the Punjabi language. He was an author for the majority of his life, working underground for 31 years. He is currently active in Sikh ideology and history, writing a series of books on Sikh history, and has been termed a Khalistan proponent by many, though he is moderate in his views. He is said to have been a deep influence on Deep Sidhu, who was the erstwhile founder of Waris Punjab De, popularised by Amritpal Singh.

== Early life ==
Ajmer Singh was born on 15 June 1948 in Mandi Kalan, Bathinda district in Punjab, India. His parents were Gurdial Kaur and Bir Singh.

He enrolled for the Bachelor of Engineering at the Guru Nanak Dev Engineering Coll in Ludhiana. But he left with his studies incomplete and joined the brewing Communist Movement in Punjab. He is said to have become the leader of leftist activists in Punjab and remained underground for 10 years.

== Literary career ==
Ajmer Singh was transformed after the events of 1984, when the Indian government launched an attack on the Golden Temple against the Sikhs there, he visited Delhi two weeks later and drew conclusions about its political motivations. He wrote reports in his Leftist organisation's monthly newspaper and is said to have reconnected with his Sikh beliefs. Afterwards, he wrote a series of four books on the history of Sikh politics in the 20th century, which included one on the 1984 developments termed "The unimaged catastrophe" and another termed the "Ideological encirclement of Sikhs".

He also dug into the history of the Ghadar Movement of the early 20th century, and came up with the conclusion that it was primarily a Sikh movement rather than an Indian nationalist movement. He wrote a book highlighting his interpretation. Ajmer Singh was a member and regular speaker at The Sikh Forum's events till date.

== Works ==
- Kis Bidh Ruli Patshahi: Sikh Rajniti Da Dukhant, Singh Brothers 2009. ISBN 978-8172053932
- 1984 – Anchitvia Kaihair [1984 – The unimagined catastrophe], Singh Brothers, 2012. ISBN 978-8172054311.
- Vihvin Sadi Di Sikh Rajniti [Sikh politics in the twentieth century], Singh Brothers, 2014. ISBN 978-8172052829
- Teeje Ghallughare Ton Baad Sikhan Di Sidhantak Gherabandi [Ideological encirclement of Sikhs after third holocaust], Singh Brothers, 2015. ISBN 978-8172055417.
- Gadari Babe Kaun Sun? Anmattiya De Kur Dahvihayan Da Khandan [Who were Ghadari Babas? Rejection of distorted claims], Singh Brothers, 2013. ISBN 978-8172055073.
- Tufanan Da Shah Aswar Shaheed Kartar Singh Sarabha', Singh Brothers, 2017. ISBN 978-8172055714
- Shaheed Kartar Singh Srabha, Tarkbharti Publications, 2018. ASIN B09RSRDXK5
- Shaheed Jaswant Singh Khalra: Soch, Sangharsh Te Shahadat, Singh Brothers 2020. ISBN 978-8172056490
