= List of Hindi film families =

Families with prominent members in the Indian film industry

This article lists notable families whose members are prominent in the Indian film industry.

This list also includes a select number of South Indian film families who crossed over into Hindi cinema. For a full list, see List of South Indian film families.

== A ==
=== Akhtar–Azmi family ===
The Akhtar family is a prominent film family in the Hindi film industry. It consists of renowned poets, authors, scriptwriters, directors, actors, and producers. One of the most famous among them is Urdu poet, author and philosopher Javed Akhtar, whose great-grandfather Fazl-e-Haq Khairabadi is a notable name in the Indian Rebellion of 1857.

Javed Akhtar's first marriage was with script writer Honey Irani; Zoya Akhtar and Farhan Akhtar are their children. Farah Khan and Sajid Khan are Honey Irani's niece and nephew, and hence Farhan and Zoya Akhtar's maternal cousins.

Javed Akhtar's second wife is actress Shabana Azmi. Shabana Azmi's nieces include actresses Farah Naaz and Tabu.

Farhan Akhtar's second wife is actress Shibani Dandekar. Anusha Dandekar is Shibani's sister.

Film personalities of Akhtar-Azmi family
1st generation	2nd generation	3rd generation	Career	Born	Died	Relation
Jan Nisar Akhtar			Poet, lyricist	1914	1976	Father of Javed Akhtar
	Javed Akhtar		Poet, playwright, lyricist	1945		Married to Honey Irani and then Shabana Azmi
	Honey Irani		Writer	1954		First wife of Javed Akhtar
		Farhan Akhtar	Director, actor	1974		Son of Javed and Honey
		Adhuna Bhabani	Hairstylist, TV host	1967		Ex-wife of Farhan Akhtar
		Shibani Akhtar	Singer, Actress, TV host, and Model	1980		Wife of Farhan Akhtar
		Zoya Akhtar	Director	1972		Daughter of Javed and Honey
	Daisy Irani		Actor	1950		Sister of Honey Irani
	Menaka Irani					Sister of Honey and Daisy Irani, parent of Farah and Sajid Khan
		Farah Khan	Director, choreographer	1965		Daughter of Kamran Khan and Menaka Irani (Honey and Daisy Irani's sister); sister of Sajid Khan
		Shirish Kunder	Film editor	1973		Married to Farah Khan
		Sajid Khan	Director, actor	1971		Son of Kamran Khan and Menaka Irani (Honey and Daisy Irani's sister); brother of Farah Khan.
	Salman Akhtar					Psychiatrist, Son of Jan Nisar Akhtar and brother of Javed Akhtar
		Kabir Akhtar	Director	1975		Son of Salman Akhtar, Nephew of Javed Akhtar
Kaifi Azmi			Poet, lyricist	1919	2002	Father of Shabana and Baba Azmi, husband of Shaukat Kaifi
Shaukat Kaifi			Actor	1926	2019	Mother of Shabana and Baba Azmi, wife of Kaifi Azmi
	Baba Azmi		Cinematographer	1943		Brother of Shabana Azmi
	Shabana Azmi		Actress	1950		Married to Javed Akhtar
	Tanvi Azmi		Actor	1960		Married to Baba Azmi, daughter of Usha Kiran
Usha Kiran			Actor	1929	2000	Mother of Tanvi Azmi and Adwait Kher
	Uttara Mhatre Kher		Model, Miss India World	1963		Married to former model Adwait Kher
		Saiyami Kher	Actress	1992		Daughter of Uttara Mhatre Kher and Adwait Kher
		Farah	Actress	1968		Niece of Shabana Azmi, daughter of Jamal Hashmi and Rizwana
		Tabu	Actress	1971		Niece of Shabana Azmi, daughter of Jamal Hashmi and Rizwana

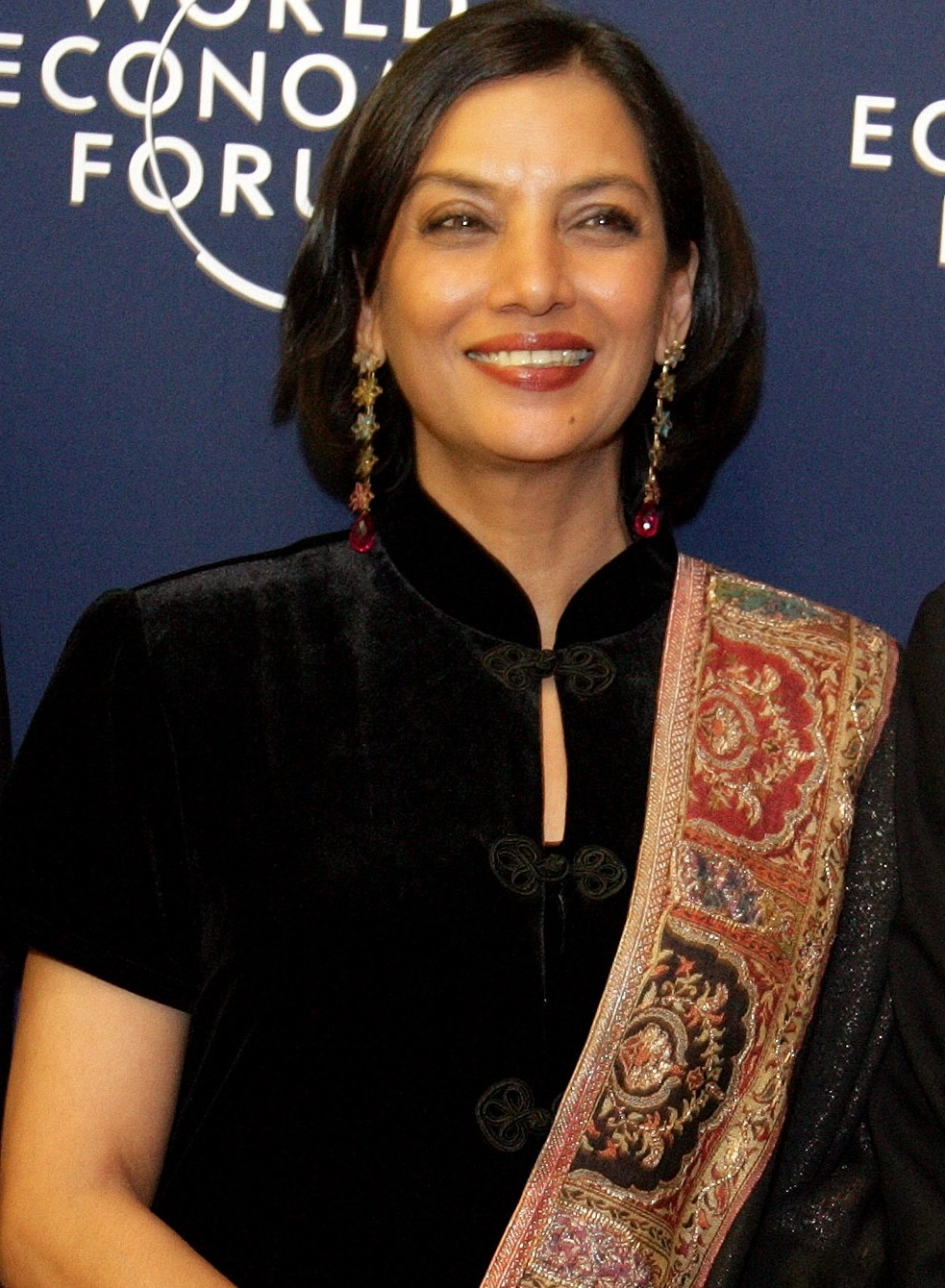
Shabana Azmi

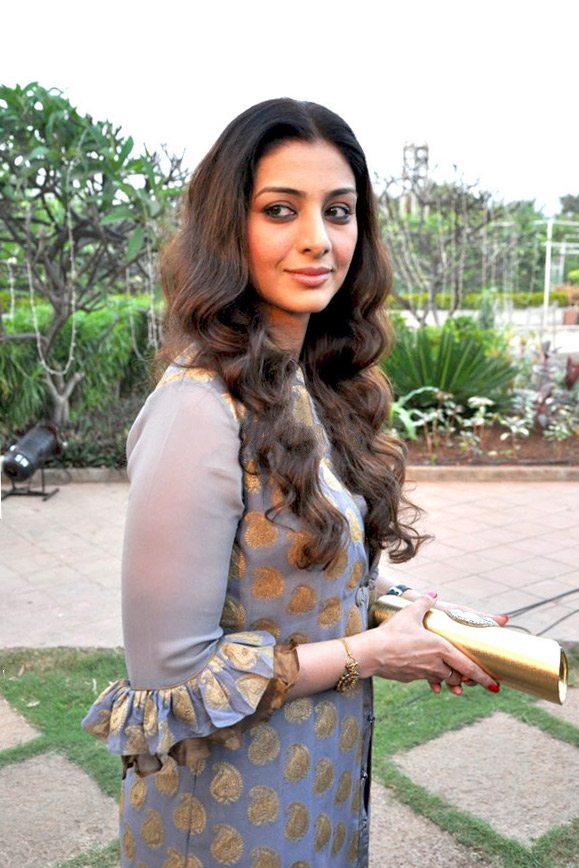
Tabu

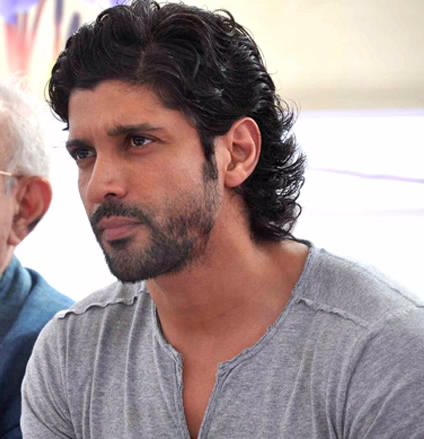
Farhan Akhtar

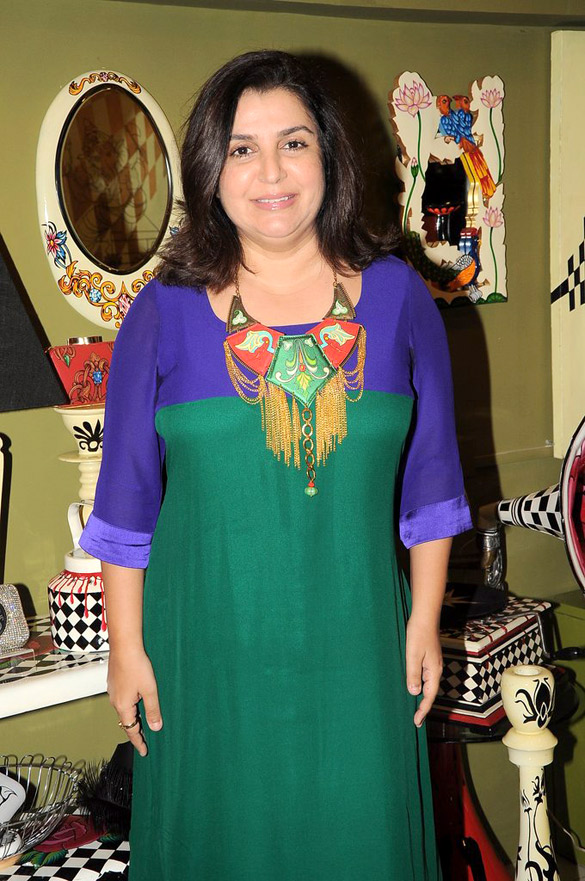
Farah Khan

=== Ali–Amrohi family ===
- Mumtaz Ali (actor, dancer)
  - Mehmood Ali (actor, comedian, son of Mumtaz Ali)
    - Pucky Ali (actor and eldest son of Mehmood & Madhu)
    - Lucky Ali (singer, actor, second son of Mehmood Ali & Madhu)
    - Macky Ali (actor and third son of Mehmood & Madhu)
  - Minoo Mumtaz (actress, dancer, daughter of Mumtaz Ali and sister of Mehmood Ali)
  - Anwar Ali (actor, son of Mumtaz Ali)
  - Madhu Ali (child actress, first wife of Mehmood, sister of Meena Kumari)
  - Meena Kumari (actress, third wife of Kamal Amrohi, sister of Madhu Ali)
  - Kamal Amrohi (director, husband of Meena Kumari)
    - Tajdar Amrohi (Producer, son of Kamal Amrohi)
    - Nilofer Amrohi (one time actress and sister of Mazhar Khan)
      - Bilal Amrohi (actor, grandson of Kamal Amrohi, married to Kumar Gaurav's daughter)
      - Mashhoor Amrohi (actor, grandson of Kamal Amrohi)
    - Mazhar Khan (actor and maternal uncle to Bilal and Mashhoor Amrohi)
    - Zeenat Aman (actress, wife of Mazhar Khan)
    - Shandaar Amrohi (Producer)

Ali-Amrohi Family

Latifunissa Ali	Mumtaz Ali	Iqbal Begum	Ali Bux
5 children	Anwar Ali	Minoo Mumtaz	Tracy Ali	Mehmood Ali	Madhu Ali	Khurshid Jr.	Meena Kumari	Kamal Amrohi	Mehmudie
3 children & 1 adopted	Pucky Ali	Lucky Ali	Macky Ali	Masoom Ali	3 children 2 grandchildren

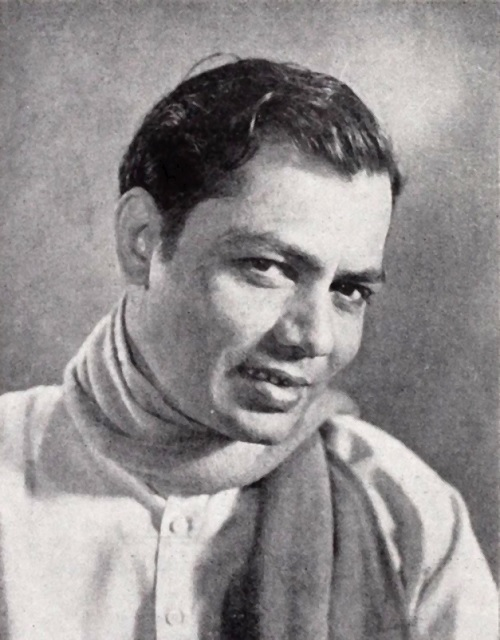
Mumtaz Ali

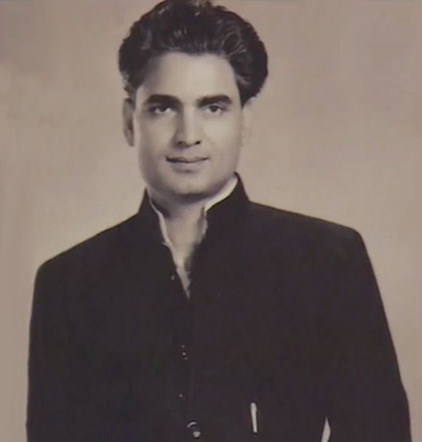
Kamal Amrohi

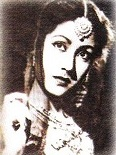
Meena Kumari

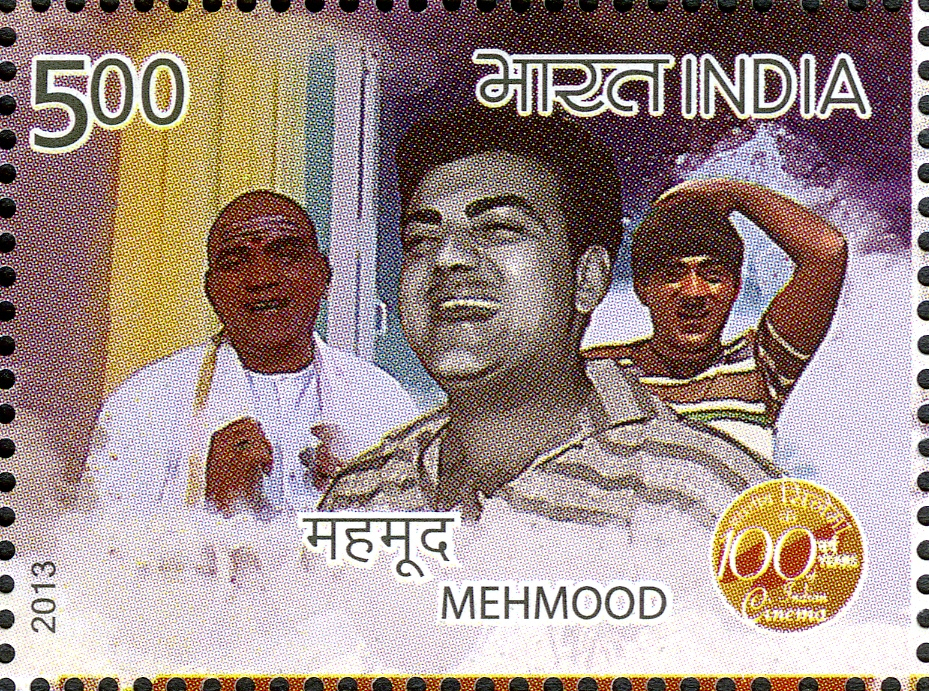
Mehmood Ali

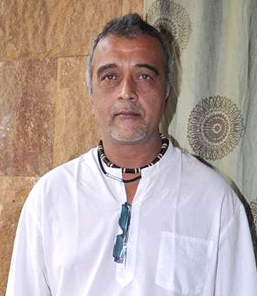
Lucky Ali

=== Anand–Sahni family ===
The most prominent member of the Anand family was actor Dev Anand, who has starred in over a hundred films. Another member of the family is internationally known director Shekhar Kapur, who is known for directing the film Elizabeth. He was married to actress Suchitra Krishnamurthy.

- Chetan Anand (elder brother of Dev Anand)
  - Uma Anand (wife of Chetan Anand)
    - Ketan Anand (son of Chetan Anand)
  - Priya Rajvansh (actress and partner of Chetan Anand)
    - Kamaljeet (actor and brother of Priya Rajvansh)
    - Waheeda Rehman (actress and wife of Kamaljeet)
- Dev Anand
  - Kalpana Kartik (wife of Dev Anand)
    - Suneil Anand (son of Dev Anand)
- Vijay Anand (younger brother of Dev Anand)
- Sheel Kanta Kapoor (mother of Shekhar Kapoor and sister of Dev Anand)
  - Shekhar Kapur (nephew of Dev Anand, son of Sheel Kanta Kapur)
    - Suchitra Krishnamurthy (ex-wife of Shekhar Kapur)
      - Kaveri Kapur (daughter of Shekhar Kapur and Suchitra Krishnamurthy)
  - Bhisham Kohli (nephew of Dev Anand, son of Savitri Kohli and cousin of Shekhar Kapoor)
    - Purab Kohli (nephew of Bhisham Kohli a.k.a Vishal Anand)
    - Aalim Rushdy Anand (Independent Filmmaker)
  - Sohaila Kapur (niece of Dev Anand and daughter of Sheel Kanta Kapur)
  - Neelu (niece of Dev Anand and daughter of Sheel Kanta Kapur)
    - Navin Nischol (actor, former brother-in-law of Shekhar Kapur, ex-husband of Neelu, daughter of Sheel Kanta Kapur and niece of Dev Anand)
  - Aruna Kapoor (niece of Dev Anand, daughter of Sheel Kanta Kapur and sister of Shekhar Kapur)
    - Parikshit Sahni (actor, son of Balraj Sahni, husband of Aruna Kapoor and brother-in-law of Shekhar Kapur)
- Balraj Sahni (actor, father of Parikshit Sahni, father-in-law of Dev Anand's niece Aruna Kapur)
- Bhisham Sahni (playwright, actor, novelist and brother of Balraj Sahni)
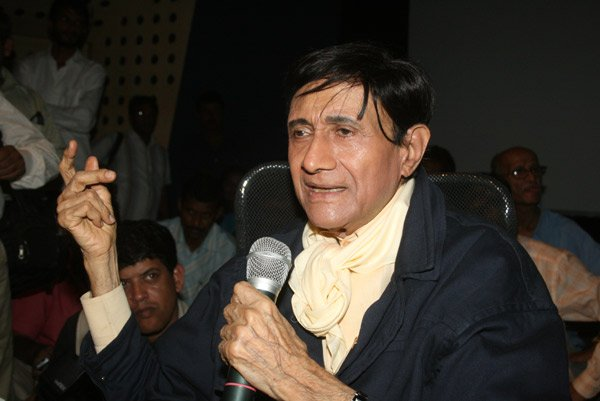
Dev Anand

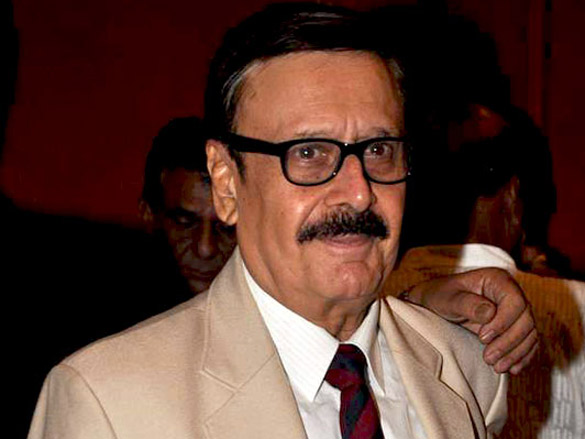
Parikshit Sahni

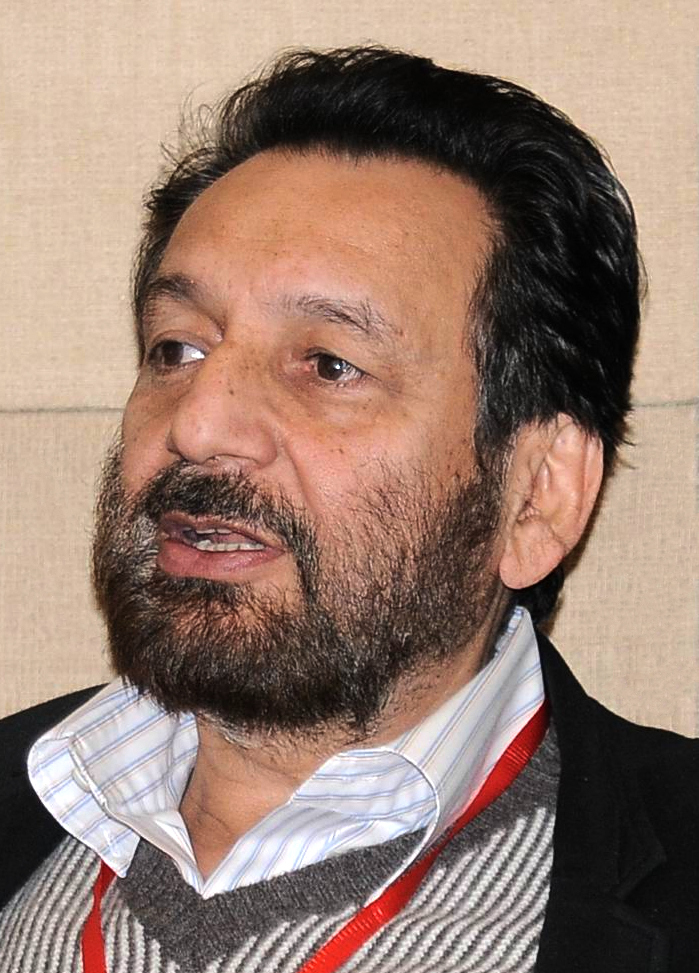
Shekhar Kapur

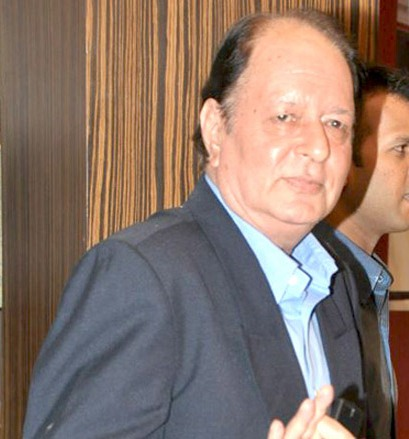
Navin Nischol

Purab Kohli

=== Anant Nag ===
- Anant Nag actor, writer, producer
- Gayatri actress and producer (wife of Anant Nag)
- Shankar Nag actor, director and producer (younger brother of Anant Nag)
- Arundathi Nag actress, director and producer (wife of Shankar Nag)
  - Padmavati Rao actress, sister of Arundati Nag

=== Agha family ===
- Rafiq Ghaznavi – actor and musician
- Salma Agha – actress and singer (granddaughter of Raj Kapoor, Shammi Kapoor, and Shashi Kapoor's maternal first cousin Jugal Kishore Mehra)
- Zahrah S. Khan – actress and singer (daughter of Salma Agha and a part of the Khan squash family)
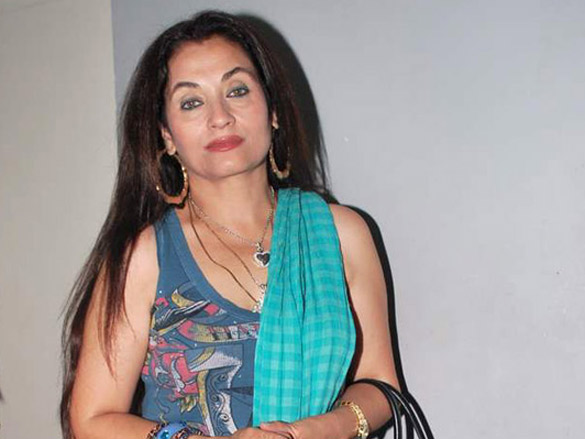
Salma Agha

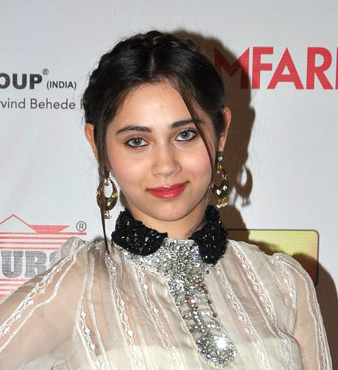
Zahrah S. Khan

== B ==
=== Babbar family ===
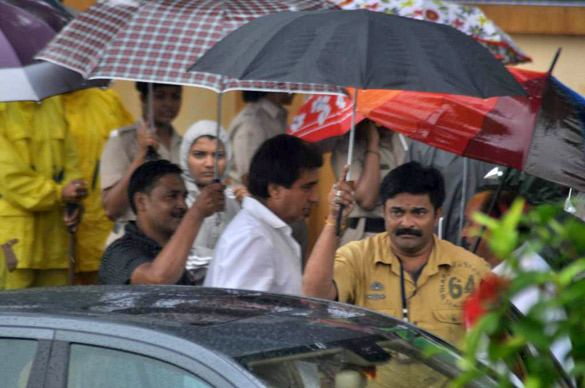
Raj Babbar

Raj Babbar is an Indian actor and politician. His first wife was Nadira Babbar, who became known with her appearance in Bride and Prejudice (2004) with Aishwarya Rai. Their children are Arya Babbar and Juhi Babbar. Both have ventured into the film industry. Raj's second wife was actress Smita Patil. She died giving birth to their only child Prateik Babbar in 1986. Their son Prateik made his acting debut in 2008 film Jaane Tu Ya Jaane Na. Raj Babbar's niece Kajri Babbar is a budding director.

- Syed Sajjad Zaheer
  - Nadira Babbar (first wife of Raj Babbar and daughter of Syed Sajjad Zaheer)
    - Arya Babbar (son of Raj Babbar and Nadira Babbar)
    - Juhi Babbar (daughter of Raj Babbar and Nadira Babbar)
    - Anup Soni (husband of Juhi Babbar)
- Shivajirao Girdhar Patil
  - Smita Patil (second wife of Raj and daughter of Shivajirao Patil)
    - Prateek Babbar (son of Smita Patil and Raj Babbar)
  - Raj Babbar
  - Kishan Babbar - brother of Raj Babbar, film producer and father of Kajri Babbar

=== Bachchan family ===
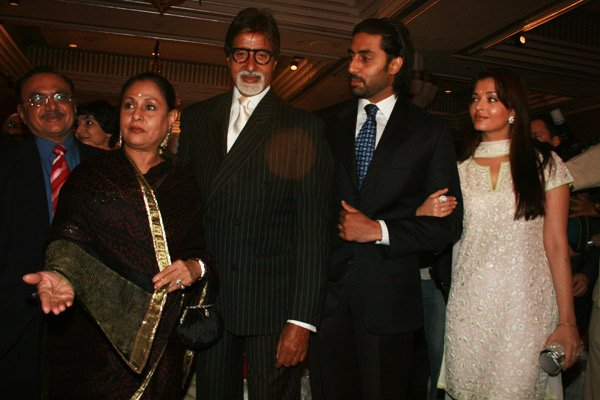
The Bachchan family (starting with second from the left) Jaya Bachchan, Amitabh Bachchan, Abhishek Bachchan and Aishwarya Rai Bachchan.

- Harivansh Rai Bachchan (poet – married to social activist Teji Bachchan, mother of Amitabh Bachchan)
  - Amitabh Bachchan (actor – married to Jaya Bachchan, son of Harivansh Rai Bachchan, father of Abhishek Bachchan, father of Shweta Bachchan-Nanda)
  - Jaya Bachchan (actress – married to Amitabh Bachchan, mother of Abhishek Bachchan)
    - Abhishek Bachchan (actor – married to Aishwarya Rai Bachchan, son of Amitabh Bachchan and Jaya Bachchan. Father of Aradhya Bachchan)
    - Aishwarya Rai Bachchan (actress – married to Abhishek Bachchan. Mother of Aradhya Bachchan)
      - Aradhya Bachchan (daughter of Abhishek Bachchan and Aishwariya Rai Bachchan, granddaughter of Amitabh and Jaya Bachchan)
    - Shweta Bachchan Nanda – (married to Nikhil Nanda, grandson of Raj Kapoor) (see Kapoor family)
      - Navya Naveli Nanda (entrepreneur, cofounder of Aara Health and Project Naveli)
      - Agastya Nanda (actor - debuting in The Archies, son of Shweta Bachchan Nanda and Nikhil Nanda, hence great-grandson of Raj Kapoor)
- Ajitabh Bachchan (entrepreneur – son of Harivansh Rai Bachchan, brother of Amitabh Bachchan)
  - Kunal Kapoor (actor, married to Ajitabh Bachchan's daughter Naina Bachchan)
- Tillotama Shome (actress – married to Jaya Bachchan's sister's son Kunal Ross)
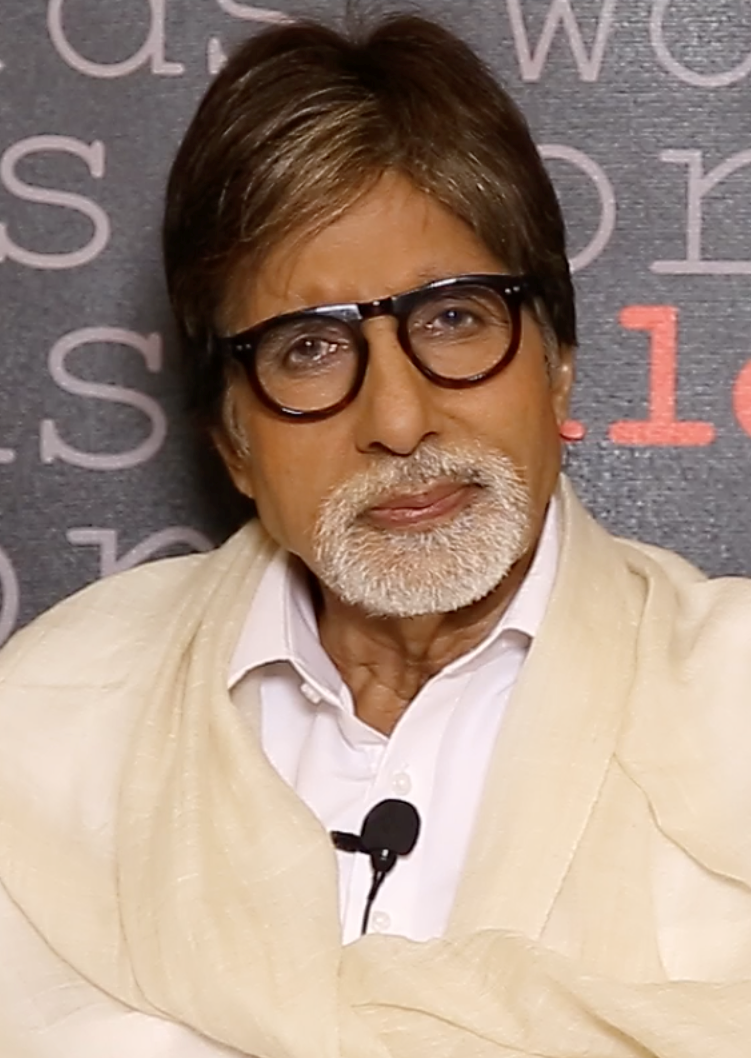
Amitabh Bachchan

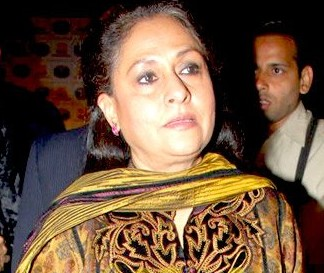
Jaya Bachchan

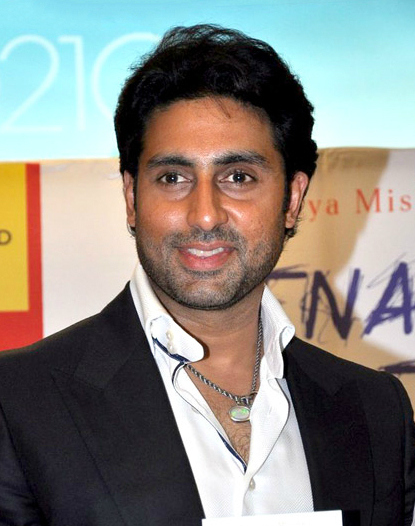
Abhishek Bachchan

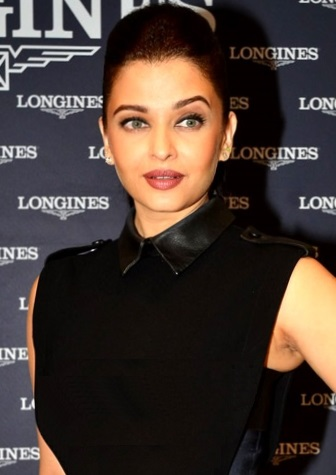
Aishwarya Rai Bachchan

=== Babi family (of Parveen Babi) ===
- Vali Mohammed Khan Babi – husband of Jamal Bakhte Babi and father of Parveen Babi.
- Jamal Bakhte Babi – wife of Vali Mohammed Khan Babi and mother of Parveen Babi.
  - Parveen Babi (actress and model) – daughter of Vali Mohammed Khan Babi and Jamal Bakhte Babi. She is great aunt of Sarwat Gilani.
- Murad Khan Babi (actor) – maternal uncle of Parveen Babi.
- Gulshan Babi – maternal aunt of Parveen Babi and wife of Murad Khan Babi.
- Ghulam Moinuddin Khanji (Nawab of Manavadar) – uncle of Parveen Babi and father of Aslam Khan. He was Sarwat Gillani's grandfather.
- Aslam Khan (cricketer) – cousin of Parveen Babi and uncle of Sarwat Gilani.
- Sarwat Gilani (actress and model) – great niece of Parveen Babi and granddaughter of Ghulam Moinuddin Khanji.
- Fahad Mirza (actor, model, plastic surgeon and sculptor) – husband of Sarwat Gilani.

=== Barjatya family ===
The Barjatya family began with Tarachand Barjatya, who was a film producer and director. He began Rajshri Productions in the late 1940s. Tarachand Barjatya had three sons, Kamal Kumar Barjatya, Raj Kumar Barjatya, and Ajit Kumar Barjatya, all of whom were active in bringing the Rajshri empire to great heights. The company saw an all time increase in revenues when Raj Kumar Barjatya's son, Sooraj R. Barjatya, started his film making career with the 1989 blockbuster, Maine Pyar Kiya and then eventually made Hum Aapke Hain Koun and Hum Saath Saath Hain. The company is now led by the third generation of Barjatyas, namely, Kavita K. Barjatya, Sooraj R. Barjatya and Rajat A. Barjatya.

- Tarachand Barjatya (director, producer, writer and founder of Rajshri Productions)
  - Kavita K. Barjatya (producer – granddaughter of Tarachand through his son Kamal Kumar Barjatya)
  - Sooraj R. Barjatya (director, producer and writer – grandson of Tarachand through his son Raj Kumar Barjatya)

=== Baweja family ===
- Harry Baweja (Director and producer)
- Pammi Baweja (wife of Harry Baweja)
  - Harman Baweja (Actor, Elder son of Harry and Pammi Baweja)

=== Bhagnani family ===
- Vashu Bhagnani (Film Producer and Distributor, founder of Pooja Entertainment)
- Pooja Bhagnani (wife of Vashu Bhagnani)
  - Jackky Bhagnani (actor, film producer, son of Vashu Bhagnani)
  - Rakul Preet Singh (actress, wife of Jackky Bhagnani)
  - Deepshikha Deshmukh (Film Producer, daughter of Vashu Bhagnani)
  - Dhiraj Deshmukh (Politician, husband of Deepshikha Bhagnani, member of Deshmukh family)

=== Bedi family (of Kabir Bedi) ===
- Kabir Bedi (actor)
- Protima Bedi (Odissi dancer – wife of Kabir Bedi)
  - Pooja Bedi (actor and model – daughter of Kabir and Protima)
    - Alaya F (daughter of Pooja Bedi)
- Nikki Bedi - ex-wife of Kabir Bedi

=== Bedi family (of Bishan Bedi) ===
- Bishan Singh Bedi (former Indian cricketer)
  - Angad Bedi (model and actor – son of Bishan Singh Bedi)
  - Neha Dhupia (model and actor – wife of Angad Bedi)

=== Bedi family (of Rajinder Singh Bedi) ===
- Rajinder Singh Bedi (writer and director)
  - Narendra Bedi (director, writer, producer - son of Rajinder Singh Bedi)
    - Manek Bedi (actor and producer - son of Narendra Bedi)
    - Rajat Bedi (actor, entrepreneur and producer - son of Narendra Bedi)
    - Tulip Joshi (actress - sister-in-law of Rajat Bedi)

=== Behl family ===
- Ramesh Behl. Producer. His wife, Madhu Behl, is a daughter of actor Kamal Kapoor (cousin of Prithviraj Kapoor) and sister of director Kapil Kapoor
  - Goldie Behl. Producer. Son of Ramesh Behl and grandson of Kamal Kapoor. Husband of actress Sonali Bendre.
  - Srishti Arya, daughter of Ramesh Behl and granddaughter of Kamal Kapoor, is the wife of Sameer Arya, son of Sulbha and Ishan Arya. Ishan Arya is a cousin of Shabana Azmi.
- Shyam Behl (brother of Ramesh Behl and of Shukla Devi Tuli).
  - Ravi Behl, producer. Son of Shyam Behl. Nephew of Ramesh Behl and Shukla Devi Tuli
  - Geeta Behl, actress. Daughter of Shyam Behl and sister of Ravi Behl. She did supporting roles in several films including Main Tulsi Tere Aangan Ki, Do Premee, etc.
- Shukla Devi Tuli, wife of Rajendra Kumar, mother of Kumar Gaurav. Sister of Ramesh and Shyam Behl.

=== Bhatt family (of Nanabhai Bhatt) ===
The Bhatt family is related to the Varma family through Shirin Mohammad Ali, wife of Nanabhai Bhatt, who was the sister of actress Purnima.

Film personalities of Bhatt Family (of Nanabhai Bhatt)
1st generation	2nd generation	3rd generation	Career	Born	Died	Relation
Nanabhai Bhatt			Director, Producer	1915	1999	Father of Robin Bhatt, Mukesh Bhatt, Mahesh Bhatt, Heena Suri, Sheila Darshan
	Robin Bhatt		Writer	1946		Son of Nanabhai Bhatt and Hemlata Bhatt
	Mukesh Bhatt		Producer	1952		Son of Nanabhai Bhatt and Shirin Mohammad Ali
		Vishesh Bhatt	Director, Producer	1988		Son of Mukesh Bhatt and Nilima Bhatt
		Sakshi Bhatt				Daughter of Mukesh Bhatt and Nilima Bhatt; married to Mazahir Mandasaurwala
	Mahesh Bhatt		Director, Writer, Producer	1948		Son of Nanabhai Bhatt and Shirin Mohammad Ali;
		Pooja Bhatt	Actress, Director, Producer	1972		Daughter of Mahesh Bhatt and Kiran Bhatt
		Rahul Bhatt		1982		Son of Mahesh Bhatt and Kiran Bhatt
		Shaheen Bhatt		1988		Daughter of Mahesh Bhatt and Soni Razdan
		Alia Bhatt	Actress, producer	1993		Daughter of Mahesh Bhatt and Soni Razdan, Married to Ranbir Kapoor (see Kapoor family)
	Sheila Darshan			1940	2009	Daughter of Nanabhai Bhatt
		Dharmesh Darshan	Director	1967		Son of Sheila Darshan and Darshan Sabharwal
	Heena Suri			1953	1990	Daughter of Nanabhai Bhatt
		Mohit Suri	Director	1981		Son of Mahesh Bhatt's sister. Married to Udita Goswami
		Smilie Suri	Actress	1983		Daughter of Mahesh Bhatt's sister
		Emraan Hashmi	Actor	1979		Nephew of Mahesh and Mukesh Bhatt through Shirin Mohammad Ali, who was the sister of Purnima

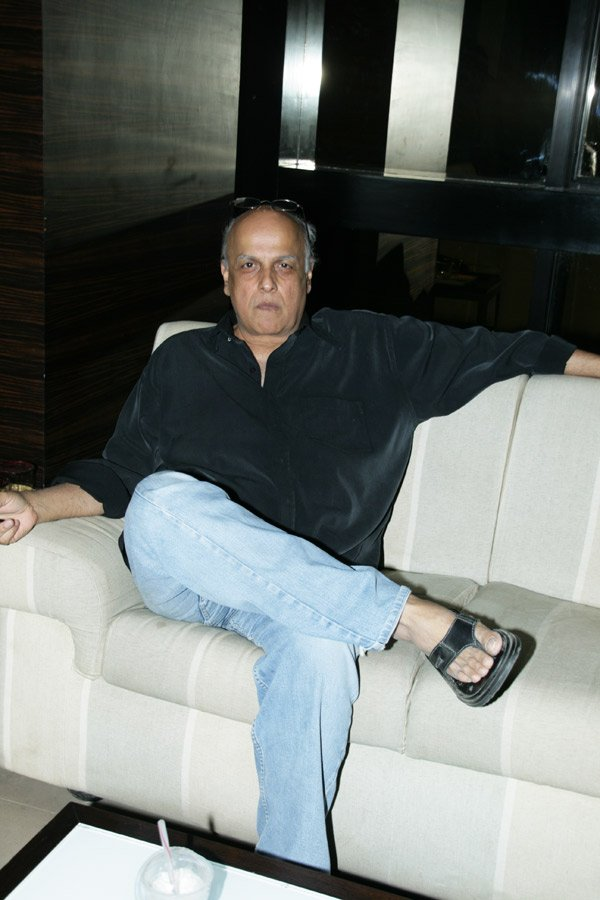
Mahesh Bhatt

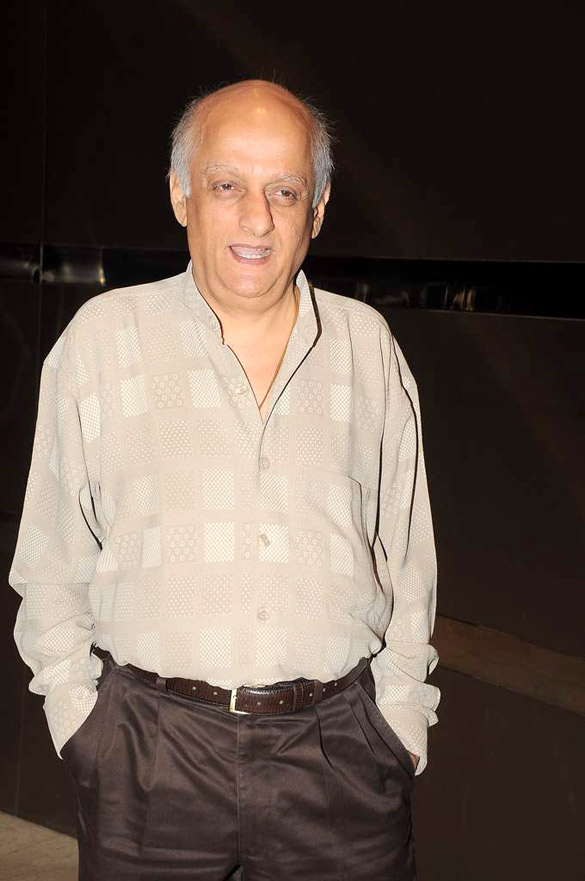
Mukesh Bhatt

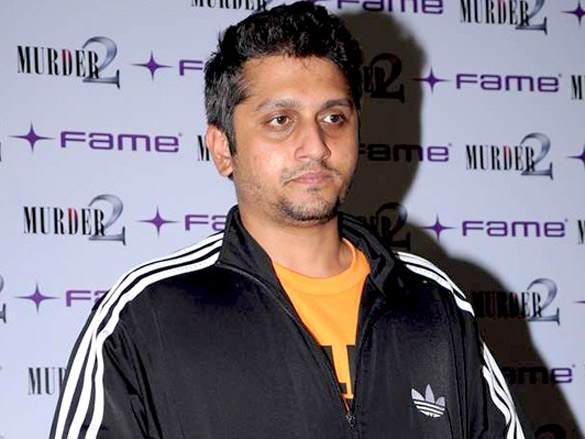
Mohit Suri

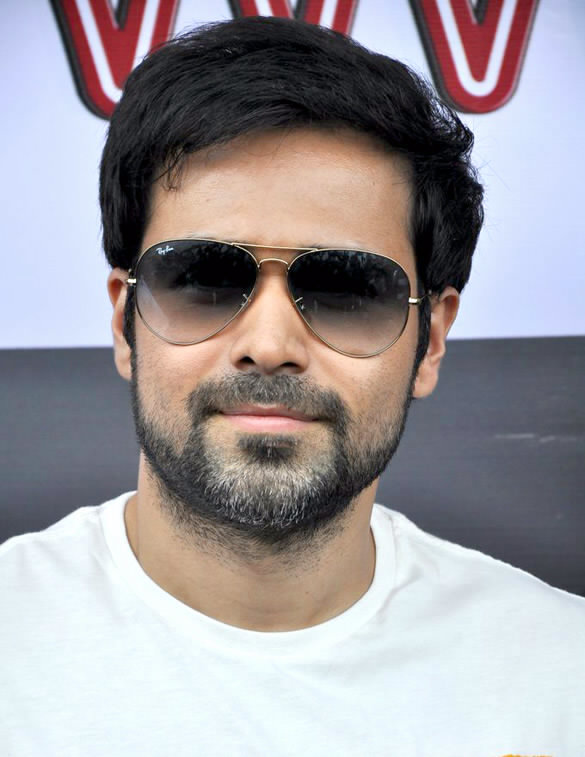
Emraan Hashmi

Alia Bhatt

=== Burke-Singh-Padukone family ===
- Sundar Singh Bhavnani (businessman, grand father of Ranveer Singh)
- Chand Burke (actress, grandmother of Ranveer Singh)
- Samuel Martin Burke (civil servant, brother of Chand Burke)
  - Jagjit Singh Bhavnani (businessman & investor, father of Ranveer Singh and son of Chand Burke and Sundar Singh Bhavnani)
  - Anju Bhavnani (Mother of Ranveer Singh, cousin to Sunita Bhavnani, Anil Kapoor's Wife)
    - Ranveer Singh (actor, grandson of Chand Burke and husband of Deepika Padukone)
    - Ritika Bhavnani (elder sister of Ranveer Singh)
      - Sunita Bhavnani (wife of Anil Kapoor, cousin of Anju Bhavnani, and part of Surinder Kapoor family)
- Prakash Padukone (badminton player)
  - Deepika Padukone (actress, daughter of Prakash Padukone, wife of Ranveer Singh)
  - Anisha Padukone (professional golfer, daughter of Prakash, sister of Deepika Padukone)

=== Bhatt family (of Vijay Bhatt) ===
- Vijay Bhatt (producer, director and screenwriter)
  - Pravin Bhatt (cinematographer and director, son of Vijay Bhatt)
    - Vikram Bhatt (director and producer, son of Pravin Bhatt)
  - Arun Bhatt (director, son of Vijay Bhatt)
    - Chirantan Bhatt (musician and singer, son of Arun Bhatt)

=== Bhattacharya family ===
- Pashupati Bhattacharjee (vocalist and composer)
  - Kumar Sanu a.k.a. Kedarnath Bhattacharjee (playback singer, producer and music director – son of Pashupati Bhattacharya)

=== Bohra family ===
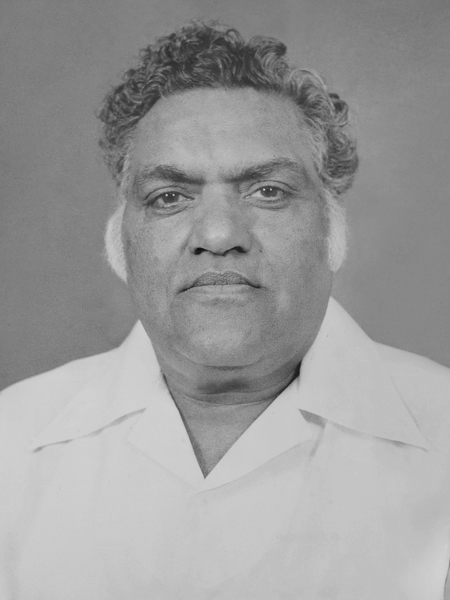
Shree Ram Bohra

- Shree Ram Bohra (producer – brother of Ramkumar Bohra)
  - Sunil Bohra (producer – grandson of Shree Ram Bohra)
- Ramkumar Bohra (producer, director – brother of Shree Ram Bohra)
  - Mahendra Bohra (producer, director – son of Ramkumar Bohra)
    - Karanvir Bohra (actor, designer, producer – son of Mahendra Bohra)

=== Bokadia family ===
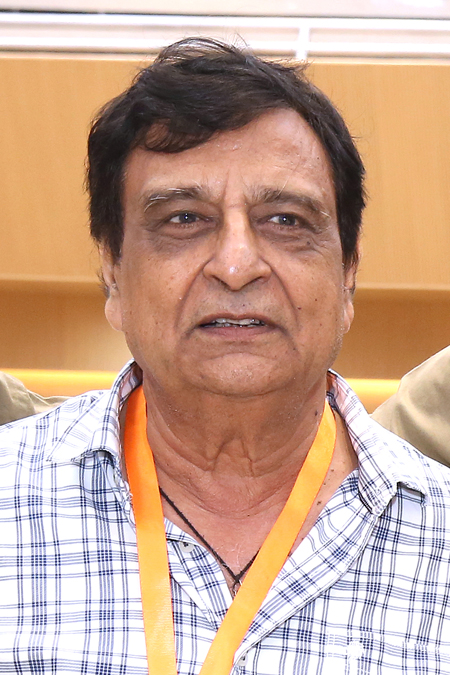
K. C. Bokadia in IMPPA election time 2022

- K. C. Bokadia (Indian filmmaker)
  - Pramod Bokadia (son of K.C. Bokadia), producer.
  - Rajesh Bokadia (son of K.C. Bokadia), producer.
  - Gautam Bokadia ( Brother of K. C. Bokadia - filmmaker)
  - Mahavir Bokadia ( Brother of K. C. Bokadia- M.C Bokadia )
  - Ratan Bokadia ( Brother of K. C. Bokadia )
  - Amit Bokadia (Son of Gautam Bokadia, work in home production )

== C ==
=== Chandrasekhar family ===
- S. A. Chandrasekhar (director)
- Shoba Chandrasekhar (director and playback singer – wife of Chandrasekhar)
  - C. Joseph Vijay (10th chief minister of Tamil Nadu, politician, actor and singer, son of Chandrasekhar and Shoba)
- S. N. Surendar (playback singer, brother of Shoba)
  - Viraj (actor, son of S. N. Surendar)
- Vikranth (actor, nephew of S. A. Chandrasekhar)

=== Chakraborty family ===
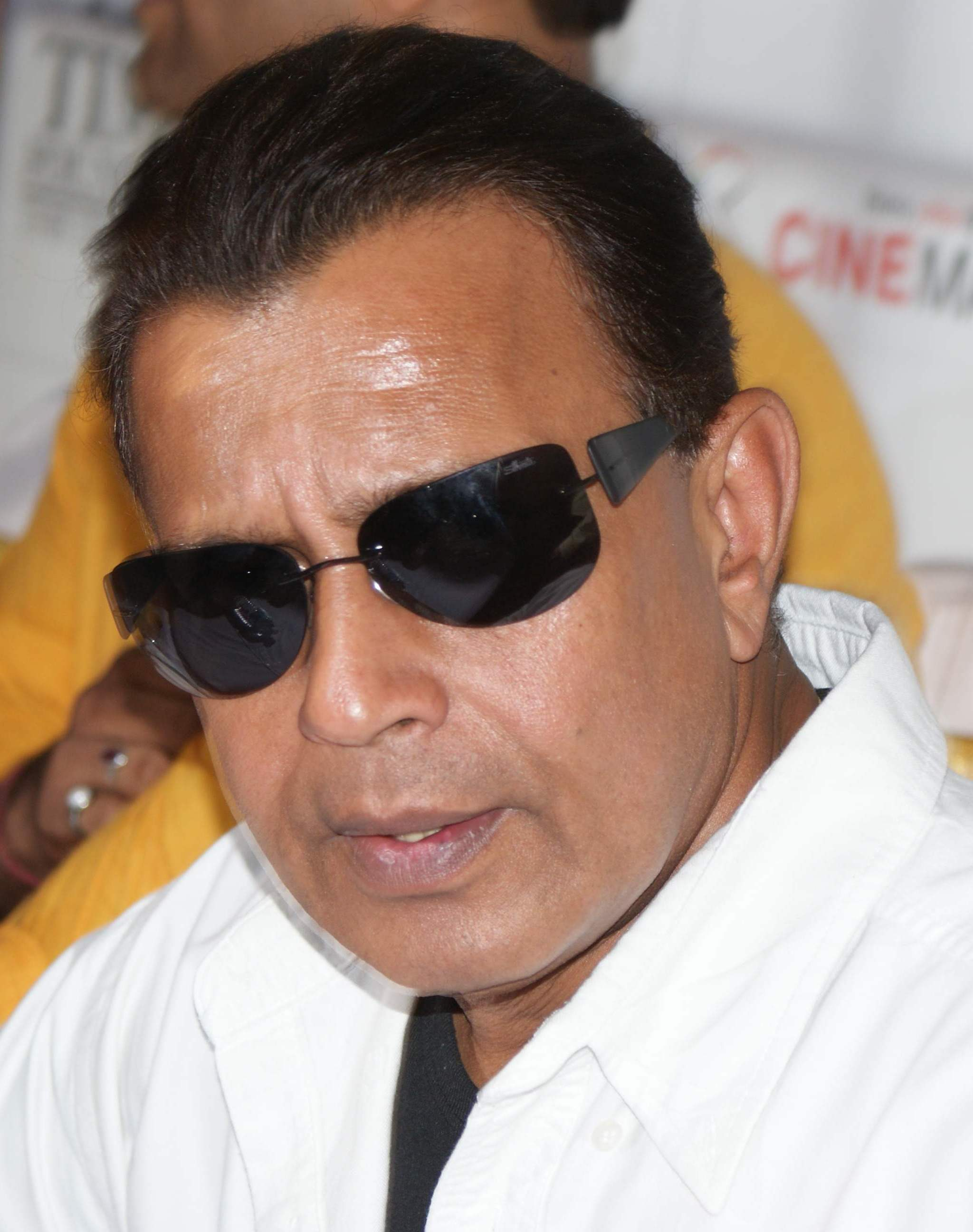
Mithun Chakraborty

- Mithun Chakraborty (actor, hotelier and producer)
- Yogeeta Bali (actress and producer – wife of Mithun Chakraborty)
  - Mahaakshay Chakraborty (actor – son of Mithun Chakraborty and Yogeeta Bali)
    - Madalsa Sharma (actress — wife of Mahaakshay Chakraborty), daughter of Sheela Sharma
  - Ushmey Chakraborty (actor – son of Mithun Chakraborty and Yogeeta Bali)
- Geeta Bali (actress – aunt of Yogeeta)
- Aditya Raj Kapoor (actor, businessman and filmmaker – cousin of Yogeeta and son of Shammi Kapoor, member of Kapoor family)

=== Chatterjee family ===
- Biswajeet Chatterjee (actor)
  - Prosenjit Chatterjee (actor – son of Biswajeet Chatterjee)
  - Debashree Roy (politician, actress– ex-wife of Prosenjeet Chatterjee)
  - Arpita Pal (actress – wife of Prosenjeet Chatterjee)
  - Pallavi Chatterjee (actress – daughter of Biswajeet Chatterjee)

=== Chopra family ===
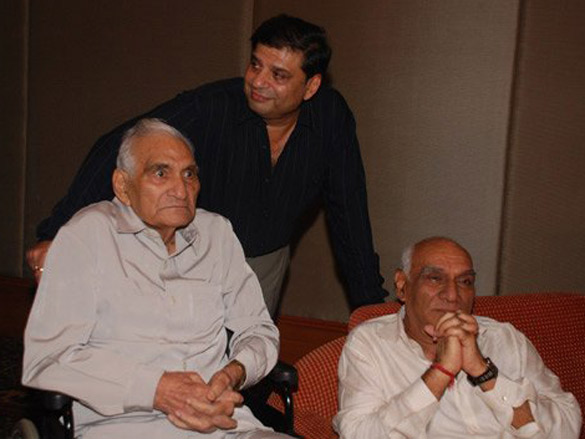
B. R. Chopra (left) and Yash Chopra (right)

Considered to be one of the most influential families of the Hindi film industry, the Chopra family has produced some of the country's biggest blockbusters and have worked in close quarters with all the leading superstars of the industry. The founders of this family were the four children of Vilayati Raj Chopra, all of whom worked independently through different leading film production / Distribution houses:

- The eldest brother, B. R. Chopra, founded B.R. Films in 1947, which was later managed and run by his son Ravi Chopra, who was also a director and a producer.
- Yash Chopra, the youngest brother, directed and produced several hits for BR Films before branching out to form his own Yash Raj Films, along with son Aditya Chopra.
- The family is related to the Johar family through Hiroo Johar, the sister of Yash Chopra, who was married to filmmaker Yash Johar.

Vilayati Raj Chopra
Baldev Raj Chopra	Yash Chopra	Pamela Chopra	Hiroo Johar	Yash Johar	D. R. Chopra	Kiran Chopra	Raj Chopra
Ravi Chopra	Renu Chopra	Rani Mukerji	Aditya Chopra	Uday Chopra	Karan Johar
Kapil Chopra	Abhay Chopra	Adira Chopra	Roohi Johar	Yash Johar

Film personalities of Chopra family
1st generation	2nd generation	3rd generation	4th generation	Born	Died	Career	Relation
B. R. Chopra				22 April 1914	5 November 2008 Kuldeep Raj Chopra Wife Asha Chopra		
	Ravi Chopra			27 September 1946	12 November 2014	Director of most-viewed Indian television series Mahabharat	Son of B. R. Chopra
Yash Chopra				27 September 1932	21 October 2012	Director, writer, producer	Brother of Baldev Raj Chopra
Pamela Chopra				29 July 1948	20 April 2023	Playback singer, producer, writer	Wife of Yash Chopra, sister of actor Simi Garewal's mother Darshi Garewal
	Aditya Chopra			21 May 1971		Writer, producer, director	Son of Pamela Chopra and Yash Chopra, brother of actor Uday Chopra, married to Rani Mukerji of Mukherjee-Samarth family
	Uday Chopra			5 January 1973		Actor, producer	Son of Pamela Chopra and Yash Chopra, brother of director Aditya Chopra, brother-in-law to Rani Mukerji
	Rani Mukerji			21 March 1978		Actress	Wife of Aditya Chopra

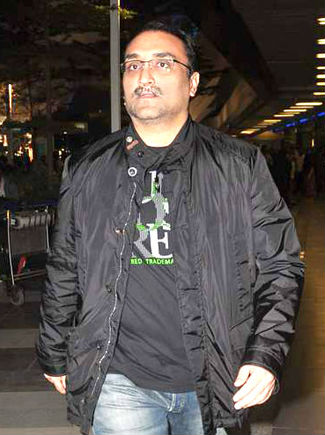
Aditya Chopra

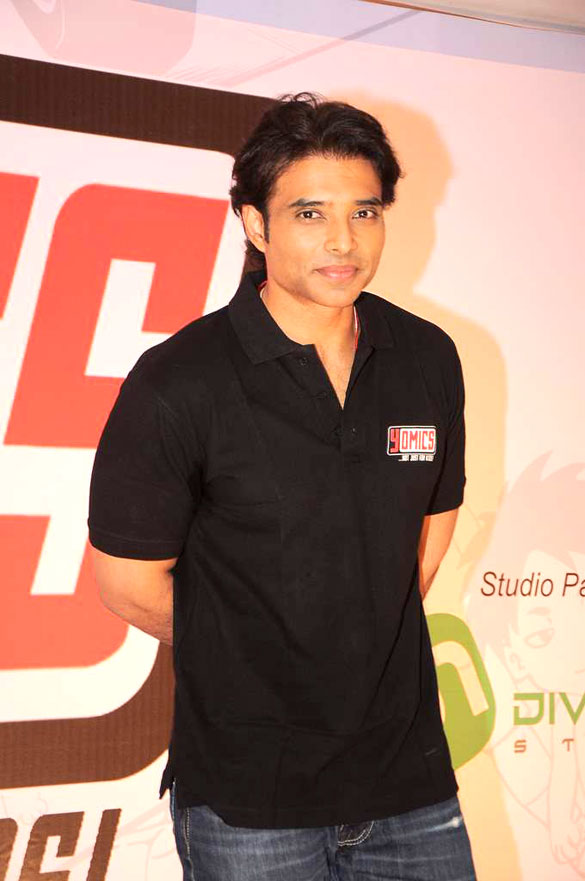
Uday Chopra

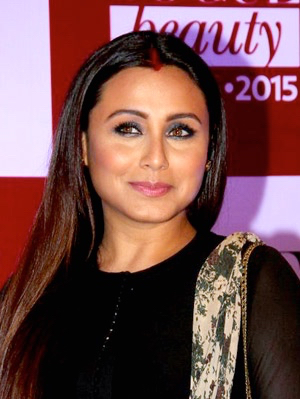
Rani Mukerji

=== Chopra-Sagar Family ===
- Ramanand Sagar - television as well as film producer and director
  - Moti Sagar - producer, Son of Ramanand
- Vidhu Vinod Chopra director and producer, Half-brother of Ramanand Sagar
  - Anupama Chopra - author and wife of Vidhu

=== Chopra family (of Prem Chopra) ===
- Prem Chopra (actor)
  - Sharman Joshi (actor and son in law)
  - Vikas Bhalla (actor and son in law)

=== Chopra family (of Priyanka Chopra) ===
- Priyanka Chopra (actress, singer and producer)
- Nick Jonas (actor-singer and husband of Priyanka)
- Parineeti Chopra (actress and singer)
- Raghav Chadha (politician and husband of Parineeti)
- Meera Chopra (actress)
- Mannara Chopra (actress)
- Neelam Upadhyaya (actress and wife of Priyanka's brother)

== D ==
=== Deol family ===
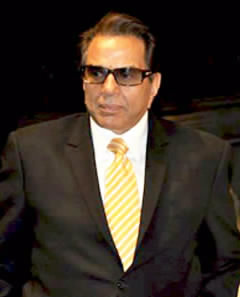
Dharmendra

The Deol family's legacy began with Dharmendra. He had six children: his two sons (Sunny Deol and Bobby Deol) went on to pursue film careers, and own Vijayta Films, while their sisters Vijeta Deol and Ajeeta Deol did not pursue a career in the film industry. Esha Deol and Ahana Deol are the two youngest daughters of Dharmendra (with Hema Malini). Esha has pursued a film career, whilst Dharmendra's nephew Abhay Deol has been in the industry since 2005, giving notable performances.

Kewal Krishan Singh Deol	Satwant Kaur
Prakash Kaur	Dharmendra	Hema Malini	Ajit Singh Deol	Usha Kaur
Sunny Deol	Lynda Deol	Bobby Deol	Tanya Deol	Vijeta Gill	Ajeeta Chaudhary	Esha Deol	Ahana Deol Vohra	Abhay Deol	Veerta Dhillon
Karan Deol	Drisha Deol	Rajveer Deol	Aryaman Deol	Dharam Deol

Film personalities of Deol Family
1st generation	2nd generation	3rd generation	Career	Born	Died	Relation
Dharmendra			Actor, producer, politician	1935	2025	Father of Sunny, Bobby, and Esha Deol
Prakash Kaur			Homemaker			First wife of Dharmendra
	Sunny Deol		Actor, director, politician	1957		Elder son of Dharmendra and Prakash Kaur; a.k.a. Ajay Singh Deol
	Lynda Deol		Homemaker			Wife of Sunny Deol, daughter of June Sarah and Krishan Dev Singh Mahal; a.k.a. Pooja Deol
		Karan Deol	Actor	1990		Elder son of Sunny and Lynda Deol
		Drisha Deol	Fashion designer			Wife of Karan Deol, daughter of Chimoo and Sumit Acharya, great-granddaughter of Bimal Roy
		Rajveer Deol	Actor	1994		Younger son of Sunny and Lynda Deol
	Bobby Deol		Actor	1969		Younger son of Dharmendra and Prakash Kaur; a.k.a. Vijay Singh Deol
	Tanya Deol		Entrepreneur			Wife of Bobby Deol, daughter of Marlene and Dev Ahuja
		Aryaman Deol		2001		Elder son of Bobby and Tanya Deol
		Dharam Deol		2004		Younger son of Bobby and Tanya Deol
Hema Malini			Actress, dancer, director, politician	1948		Second wife of Dharmendra
	Esha Deol		Actress	1981		Elder daughter of Dharmendra and Hema Malini
	Ahana Deol Vohra		Entrepreneur	1985		Younger daughter of Dharmendra and Hema Malini
	Abhay Deol		Actor	1976		Nephew of Dharmendra, son of Ajit Singh Deol and Usha Kaur, cousin of Sunny, Bobby and Esha.

Other relatives: Guddu Dhanoa (Dharmendra's cousin)

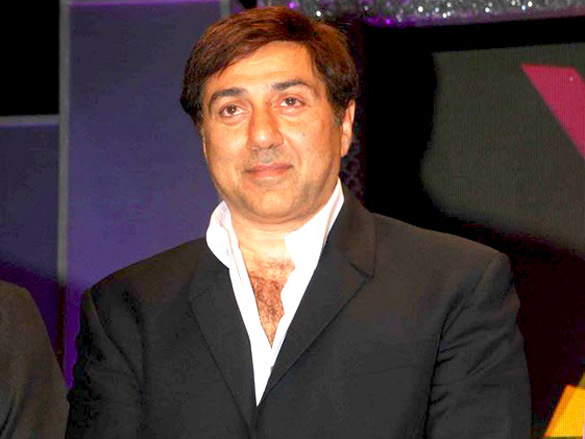
Sunny Deol

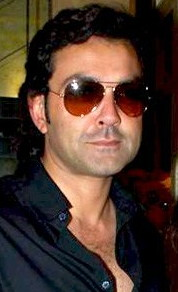
Bobby Deol

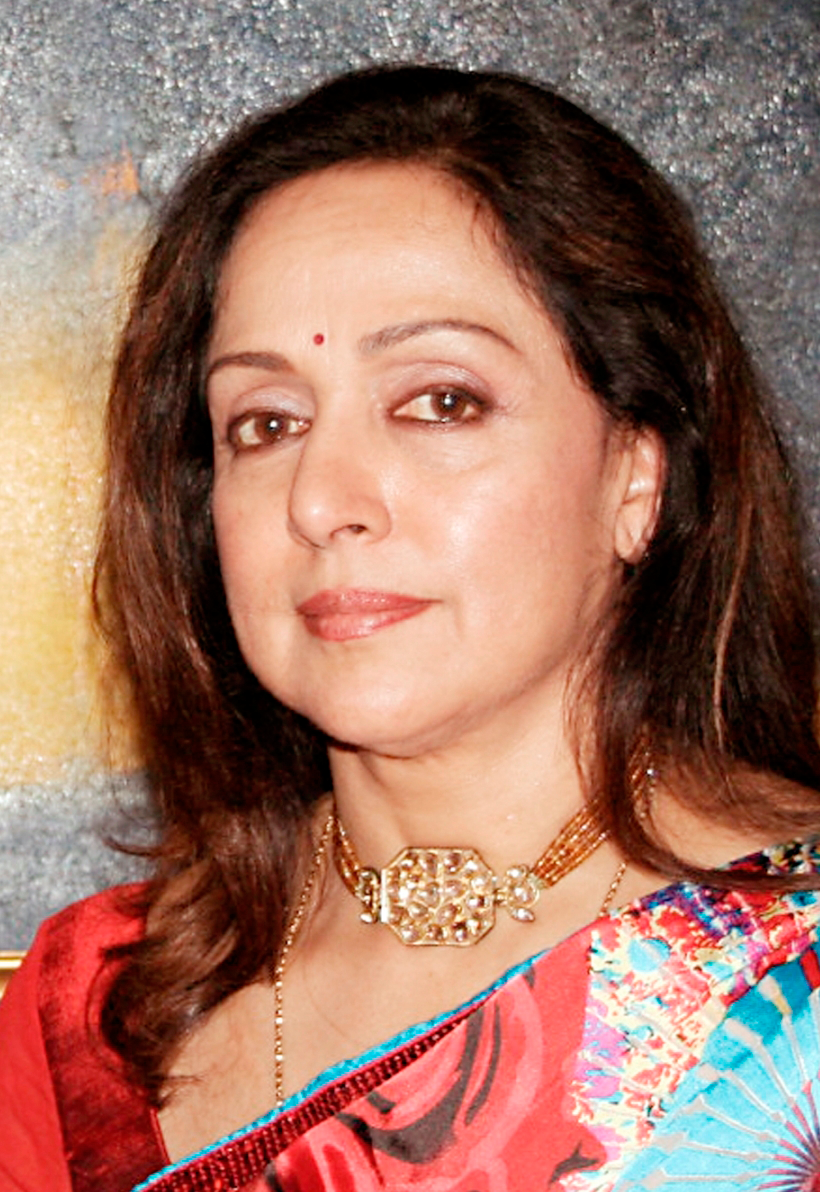
Hema Malini

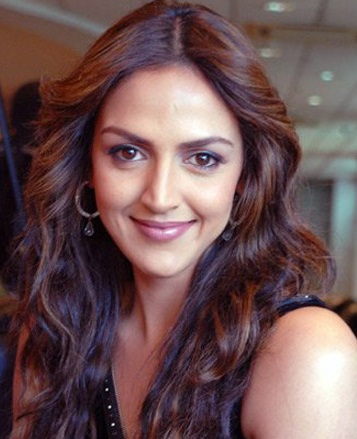
Esha Deol

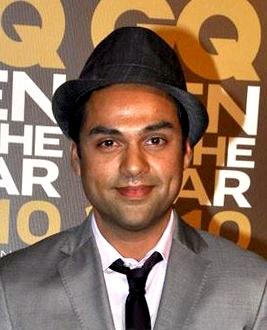
Abhay Deol

=== Devgan family ===
- Veeru Devgan (producer and action choreographer, father of Ajay Devgan)
  - Ajay Devgn (actor, director and producer elder son of Veeru Devgan, married to Kajol)
  - Kajol (actress, member of the Mukherjee-Samarth family) married to Ajay Devgn.
  - Anil Devgan (director, son of Prem Prakash Devgan)
  - Aaman Devgan (actor, Nephew of Ajay Devgn)
  - Nysa Devgan (Daughter of Ajay Devgn)
  - Yug Devgan (Son of Ajay Devgn)
  - Dinesh Gandhi (Director, Nephew of Ajay Devgn)
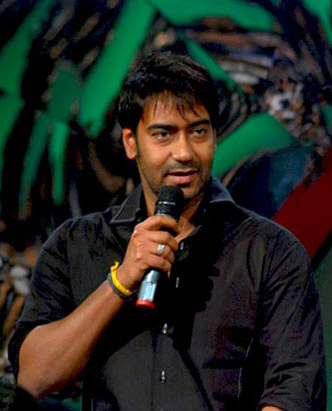
Ajay Devgn

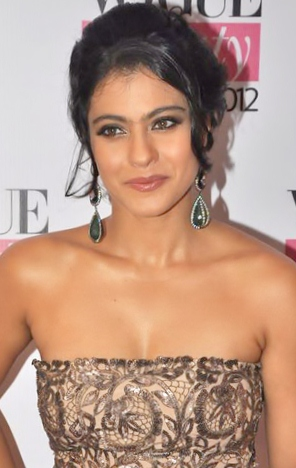
Kajol

=== Deshmukh family ===
- Dagadojirao Deshmukh + Sushila Deshmukh
  - Vilasrao Deshmukh (Former Chief Minister of Maharashtra) + Vaishali Deshmukh
    - Amit Deshmukh (politician – elder son of Vilasrao Deshmukh)
      - Aditi Deshmukh (actress - wife of Amit Deshmukh)
    - Riteish Deshmukh (architect, actor, producer and singer – son of Vilasrao Deshmukh)
      - Genelia D'Souza (actress, model and host – wife of Riteish Deshmukh)
    - Dhiraj Deshmukh (politician – younger son of Vilasrao Deshmukh)
      - Deepshikha Deshmukh (Director, Producer– wife of Dhiraj Deshmukh, member of Bhagnani family)
  - Diliprao Deshmukh
    - Gaurawi Deshmukh Bhosale - Only Daughter of Former MLC Diliprao Deshmukh and wife of Politician & MLA Atulbaba Suresh Bhosale
Vilasrao Deshmukh

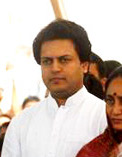
Amit Deshmukh

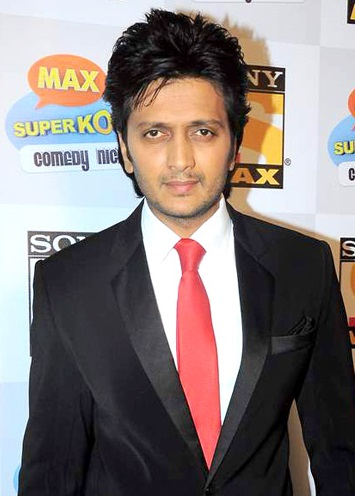
Riteish Deshmukh

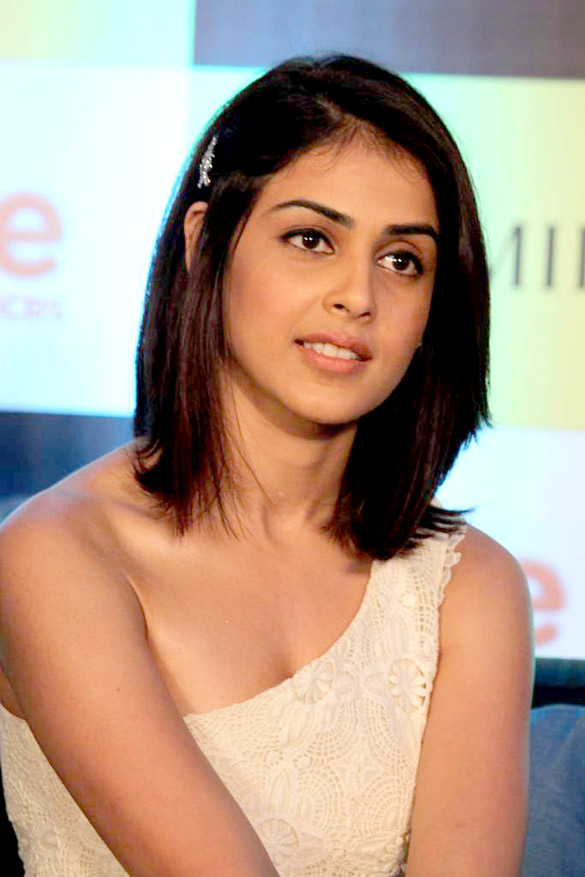
Genelia Deshmukh

=== Dhawan family ===
- Anil Dhawan (actor – brother of David Dhawan, father of Siddharth and uncle of Varun Dhawan and Rohit Dhawan)
  - Siddharth Dhawan – (television actor – son of Anil Dhawan, cousin of Rohit and Varun Dhawan)
    - Anjini Dhawan - (actress - daughter of Siddharth Dhawan)
- David Dhawan (director, producer-brother of Anil Dhawan and father of Rohit and Varun Dhawan)
  - Varun Dhawan (actor – son of David Dhawan and Karuna Dhawan, brother of Rohit Dhawan, nephew of Anil Dhawan and cousin of Siddharth Dhawan)
  - Rohit Dhawan (director - son of David Dhawan and Karuna Dhawan, brother of Varun Dhawan)
- Kunal Kohli (director, producer – son of Yash Kohli (sister of Karuna Dhawan) and the late Shiv Kohli; cousin of Varun Dhawan)

=== Dutt family (of Guru Dutt) ===
Vasanth Kumar Shivashankar Padukone (9 July 1925 – 10 October 1964), popularly known as Guru Dutt (Konkani:गुरु दत्त), was an Indian film director, producer and actor. He made quintessential 1950s and 1960s classics such as Pyaasa (Thirsty), Kaagaz Ke Phool (Paper Flowers), Sahib Bibi Aur Ghulam (The King, the Queen and the Jack), and Chaudhvin Ka Chand (The Fourteenth Day Moon in the Muslim calendar but actually means full moon, a metaphor for beauty). In particular, Pyaasa and Kaagaz Ke Phool are now included among the greatest films of all time, both by Time magazine's All-Time 100 best movies and by the Sight and Sound critics' and directors' poll, where Dutt himself is included among the greatest film directors of all time. In 2010, he was included among CNN's "top 25 Asian actors of all time".

- Guru Dutt (Indian film actor, director, producer, choreographer, and writer. He is regarded as one of the greatest filmmakers of Indian cinema)
- Geeta Dutt (singer – wife of Guru Dutt)
- Shyam Benegal (director – his paternal grandmother and Dutt's maternal grandmother were sisters)
- Lalita Lajmi (Painter and sister of Guru Dutt)
  - Kalpana Lajmi (director – niece of Guru Dutt)
    - Amrita Rao (actress – her grandfather and Guru Dutt were second cousins)
    - Preetika Rao (actress – sister of Amrita Rao, her grandfather and Guru Dutt were second cousins)

Note: Composer Kanu Roy was not the brother of Geeta Dutt

=== Dutt family (of Sunil Dutt) ===
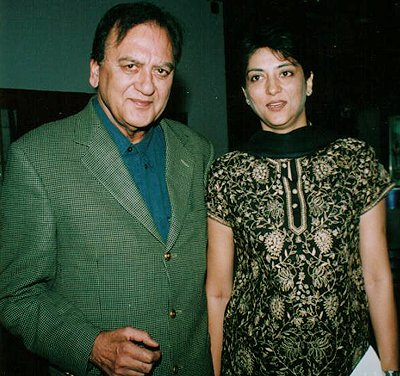
Sunil Dutt and Priya Dutt

Jaddanbai, the start of the family, began as a singer and eventually became a filmmaker. Her husband was Abdul Rashid. Their daughter Nargis began her film career at age six when cast by her mother in one of her films. Nargis went on to become a major star in the 1940s and 1950s. Sunil Dutt started his acting career in the late 1950s. Sunil also became a major star in 1960s and 1970s. Nargis went into semi-retirement after their marriage in 1958, and full retirement in 1967, but Sunil continued to act until the early 1990s and gave a brief appearance in early 2000s. Their son, Sanjay had pursued a successful film career since 1981 and continues to act today. Nargis died from cancer in 1981 when her son made his debut and Sunil Dutt died in May 2005 due to heart attack.

The Dutt family is also known for its political involvement. Sunil was elected five times to the Lok Sabha (the lower house of the Parliament of India) and, at his death, was a cabinet minister under Manmohan Singh. Nargis was a nominated member of the Parliament's upper house, Rajya Sabha, and died in office in 1981. After Sunil's death, their daughter Priya Dutt ran for, and was elected to Sunil's vacant seat in the Lok Sabha until 2014.

Nargis-Sunil Dutt's granddaughter and Sanjay Dutt's niece Sanchi Kumar (daughter of Kumar Gaurav and Namrata Dutt) is married to Indian film director Kamal Amrohi's grandson Bilal Amrohi.

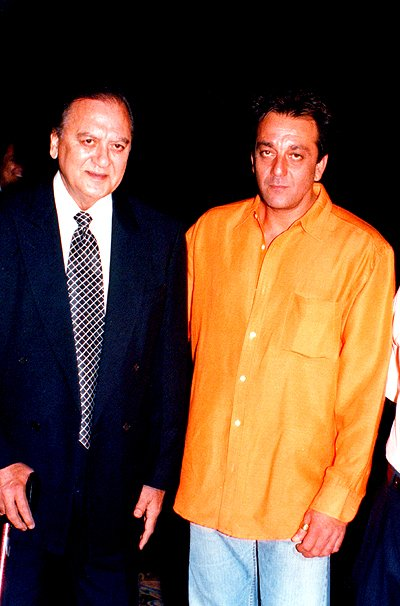
Sunil Dutt (left) with Sanjay Dutt

- Jaddanbai (actress – mother of Nargis, Anwar Hussain and Akhtar Hussain)
  - Anwar Hussain (actor – son of Abdul Rashid and Jaddanbai)
  - Akhtar Hussain (son of Jaddanbai)
    - Zaheeda Hussain (actor – daughter of Akhtar Hussain)
      - Nilesh Sahay (son of Zahida Hussain)
  - Nargis (late daughter of Abdul Rashid and Jaddanbai)
  - Sunil Dutt (late husband of Nargis)
    - Priya Dutt (politician – youngest daughter of Sunil and Nargis)
    - Sanjay Dutt (actor – son of Sunil and Nargis)
    - Richa Sharma (late wife of Sanjay Dutt)
    - Manyata Dutt (wife of Sanjay Dutt)
    - Namrata Dutt (eldest daughter of Sunil and Nargis, wife of Kumar Gaurav)
    - Trishala Dutt (daughter of Sanjay Dutt and Richa Sharma, first grand-daughter of Sunil and Nargis)
    - Nimai Bali (actor, nephew of Sunil Dutt [Sunil Dutt's sister's son] and cousin to Sanjay Dutt)
    - Sahila Chaddha (actress, wife of Nimai Bali)
- Fatma Begum (filmmaker- ex-wife of Nawab Sidi Ibrahim Muhammad Yakut Khan III of Sachin State)
  - Sultana (actress- daughter of Fatma Begum and the Nawab)
    - Jamila Razzaq (actress - daughter of Sultana and Seth Razzaq)
  - Shahzadi (actress- daughter of Fatma Begum and the Nawab)
  - Zubeida (actress- daughter of Fatma Begum and the Nawab)
    - Durr-e-shahwar Dhanrajgir (daughter of Zubeida and Maharaj Narsingir Dhanrajgir Gyan Bahadur of Hyderabad)
      - Rhea Pillai (actress- daughter of Raymond Pillai and Durr-e-shahwar Dhanrjgir, ex-wife of Sanjay Dutt)
  - Rajendra Kumar (veteran actor, father of Kumar Gaurav)
    - Kumar Gaurav (actor, son of Rajendra Kumar and husband of Namrata Dutt)
      - Bilal Amrohi (actor, grandson of Kamal Amrohi, son-in-law of Kumar Gaurav)

=== Dutta family ===
- O. P. Dutta (filmmaker and writer)
  - J. P. Dutta (producer and director, son of O. P. Dutta)
  - Bindiya Goswami (actress and costume designer, wife of J. P. Dutta)

=== Dheer family ===
- Pankaj Dheer (film and television actor)
  - Nikitin Dheer (son of Pankaj & Anita, film and television actor)
  - Kratika Sengar (wife of Nikitin Dheer, television actress)

== G ==
=== Ganguly family ===
Ashok, Kishore, and Anoop Kumar have all acted in the film industry. Their family is related to the Mukherjee family through the marriage of Sashadhar Mukherjee to their only sister Sati Devi. The family is also related to the Ray-Ganguly-Bose family through the first wife of Kishore Kumar, Ruma Guha Thakurta, who is a niece of Bijoya Ray.

- Ashok Kumar
  - Preeti Ganguly (daughter of Ashok Kumar)
  - Rupa Ganguly (daughter of Ashok Kumar)
  - Aroop Kumar (Son of Ashok Kumar)
  - Deven Verma (son-in-law of Ashok Kumar via marriage to elder daughter Rupa Ganguly)
  - Bharati Jaffrey (actress, daughter of Ashok)
    - Anuradha Patel (actress, daughter of Bharathi and granddaughter of Ashok Kumar)
    - Kanwaljit Singh (husband of Anuradha)
      - Kiara Advani (actress, step-granddaughter of Bharathi Jaffrey)
      - Sidharth Malhotra (actor, husband of Kiara)
- Anoop Kumar (actor and first younger brother of Ashok Kumar)
- Kishore Kumar (actor and singer, youngest brother of Ashok and Anoop)
- Ruma Guha Thakurta (first wife of Kishore Kumar)
  - Amit Kumar (singer, son of Kishore Kumar and Ruma Guha Thakurta)
- Madhubala (second wife of Kishore Kumar)
- Yogeeta Bali (third wife of Kishore Kumar)
- Leena Chandavarkar (fourth wife of Kishore Kumar)
  - Sumeet Kumar (singer, son of Kishore Kumar and Leena Chandavarkar)

=== Gautam family ===
- Mukesh Gautam (Punjabi film director)
  - Yami Gautam (actress, daughter of Mukesh) + Aditya Dhar (writer, director, lyricist)
  - Surilie Gautam (actress, sister of Yami)

=== Ghatak family ===
- Manish Ghatak (eldest son of Suresh Chandra Ghatak, Bengali poet and novelist)
  - Mahasweta Devi (daughter of Manish Ghatak & Dharitri Devi, niece of Ritwik Ghatak; Indian social activist and writer)
  - Bijon Bhattacharya (married to Mahasweta Devi, prominent Indian theatre and film personality from Bengal)
    - Nabarun Bhattacharya (son of Bijon Bhattacharya & Mahasweta Devi)
  - Parambrata Chatterjee (son of Satinath and Sunetra Ghatak Chattopadhyay – actor, director and film maker)
- Ritwik Ghatak (filmmaker, script writer and actor)

=== Ghattameneni family ===
- Krishna (actor, director and producer)
- Vijaya Nirmala (actress and director, second wife of Krishna)
  - Ramesh Babu (actor and producer, son of Krishna and Indira)
  - Mahesh Babu (actor and producer, son of Krishna and Indira)
  - Namrata Shirodkar (actress, wife of Mahesh Babu)
  - Manjula Ghattamaneni (actress and producer, daughter of Krishna and Indira)
  - Sudheer Babu (actor, Son-in-law of Krishna and Indira, husband of Priyadarshini)

=== Godbole family ===
- Shrirang Godbole (lyricist, writer and director)
  - Mrinmayee Godbole (actress – daughter of Shrirang Godbole)
  - Girija Oak (actress – daughter-in-law of Shrirang Godbole, daughter of Girish Oak)

=== Gokhale family (of Kamlabai Gokhale) ===
- Durgabai Kamat (first female artist in Indian film Industry)
  - Kamlabai Gokhale (daughter of Durgabai Kamat, first female child artist in Indian film industry)
  - Raghunathrao Gokhale (husband of Kamlabai Gokhale)
    - Chandrakant Gokhale (son of Kamlabai and Raghunathrao Gokhale, actor)
      - Vikram Gokhale (actor, son of Chandrakanta, and National award-winning actor)
      - Vrushali Gokhali (actress, wife of Vikram Gokhale)
        - Aasavari Gokhale (daughter of Vikram Gokhale)
        - Neha Gokhale (daughter of Vikram Gokhale)
      - Mohan Gokhale (actor)
      - Shubhangi Gokhale (actress, wife of Mohan)
        - Sakhi Gokhale (actress, daughter of Mohan)
        - Suvrat Joshi (actor, husband of Sakhi Gokhale)

=== Goswami family (of Hindi films) ===
Manoj Kumar was born as Harikishan Giri Goswami in 1937 in Abbottabad. He started his film career in 1957. But it was films like Pathar ke Sanam and Woh Kaun Thi which gave him his fame. His career took off on a different path when he launched his production house Vishal International, making classics like Upkar, Purab aur Paschim, Roti Kapda aur Makan and Kranti which earned him the title of "Bharat Kumar". Though he is a Bollywood legend, his sons were unsuccessful in Bollywood.

- Manoj Kumar (actor, producer and director)
- Shashi Goswami (wife of Manoj Kumar)
  - Kunal Goswami (actor – son of Manoj Kumar)

=== Goswami family (of Assamese films) ===
- Moloya Goswami (actress)
- Nishita Goswami (actress – daughter of Pradip Goswami and Moloya Goswami)

=== Ahuja Family (Govinda's Family) ===
- Arun Kumar Ahuja (father of Govinda)
- Nirmala Devi (mother of Govinda)
  - Govinda (son of Arun and Nirmala)
  - Sunita Ahuja (wife of Govinda)
    - Tina Ahuja (actress, daughter of Govinda)
    - Yashvardhan Ahuja (actor, son of Govinda)
    - Krushna Abhishek (comedian, actor, nephew of Govinda)
    - Kashmera Shah (actress, wife of Krushna)
    - Arti Singh (actress, sister of Krushna Abhishek and niece of Govinda)
    - Vinay Anand (nephew of Govinda)
    - Ragini Khanna (actress, sister of Amit and niece of Govinda)
    - Soumya Seth (actress, cousin of Krushna Abhishek, Arti, Amit and Ragini)
- Kumkum, half-sister of Nirmala Devi (same father)

=== Gulzar family ===
- Gulzar (lyricist, writer and director)
- Rakhee Gulzar (actress – wife of Gulzar)
  - Meghna Gulzar (director – daughter of Gulzar and Rakhee)

== H ==
=== Haasan–Ratnam family ===
Originated in Tamil Nadu, Kamal Haasan and Mani Ratnam are two of the biggest names in the industry.

- Kamal Haasan, Actor, film producer, film director, screenwriter, playback singer, lyricist, television presenter, choreographer, dancer, philanthropist & politician
- Vani Ganapathy, actress; ex-wife of Kamal Haasan.
- Sarika, actress; ex-wife of Kamal Haasan.
  - Shruti Haasan, actress & singer; daughter of Kamal Haasan and Sarika.
  - Akshara Haasan, actress; daughter of Kamal Haasan and Sarika.
- Gautami, actress; ex-partner of Kamal Haasan.
- Charuhasan, actor; brother of Kamal Haasan.
  - Suhasini Maniratnam, actress; daughter of Charuhasan and Komalam.
  - Mani Ratnam, director; husband of Suhasini.
  - G. Venkateswaran, producer (d. 2003); brother of Mani Ratnam.
  - G. Srinivasan, producer (d. 2007); brother of Mani Ratnam.
- Chandrahasan, producer (d. 2017); brother of Kamal Haasan.
  - Anu Hasan, actress; daughter of Chandrahasan.
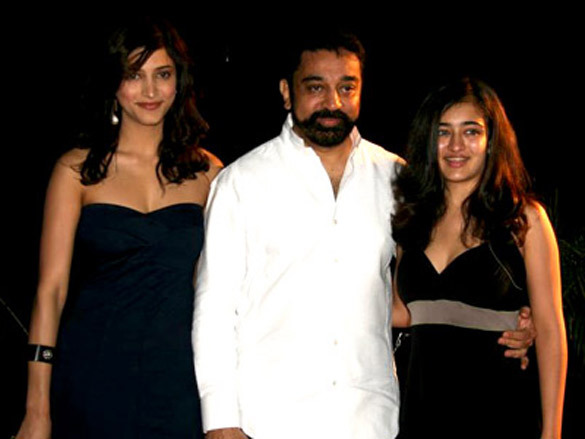
Kamal Haasan with daughters Shruti Haasan (left) and Akshara Haasan (right) in 2010.

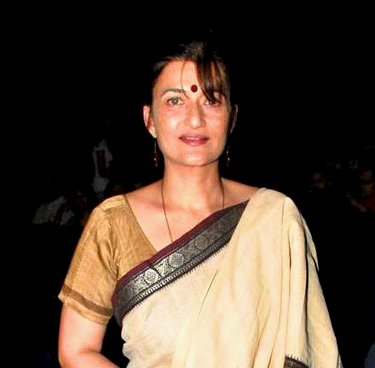
Sarika

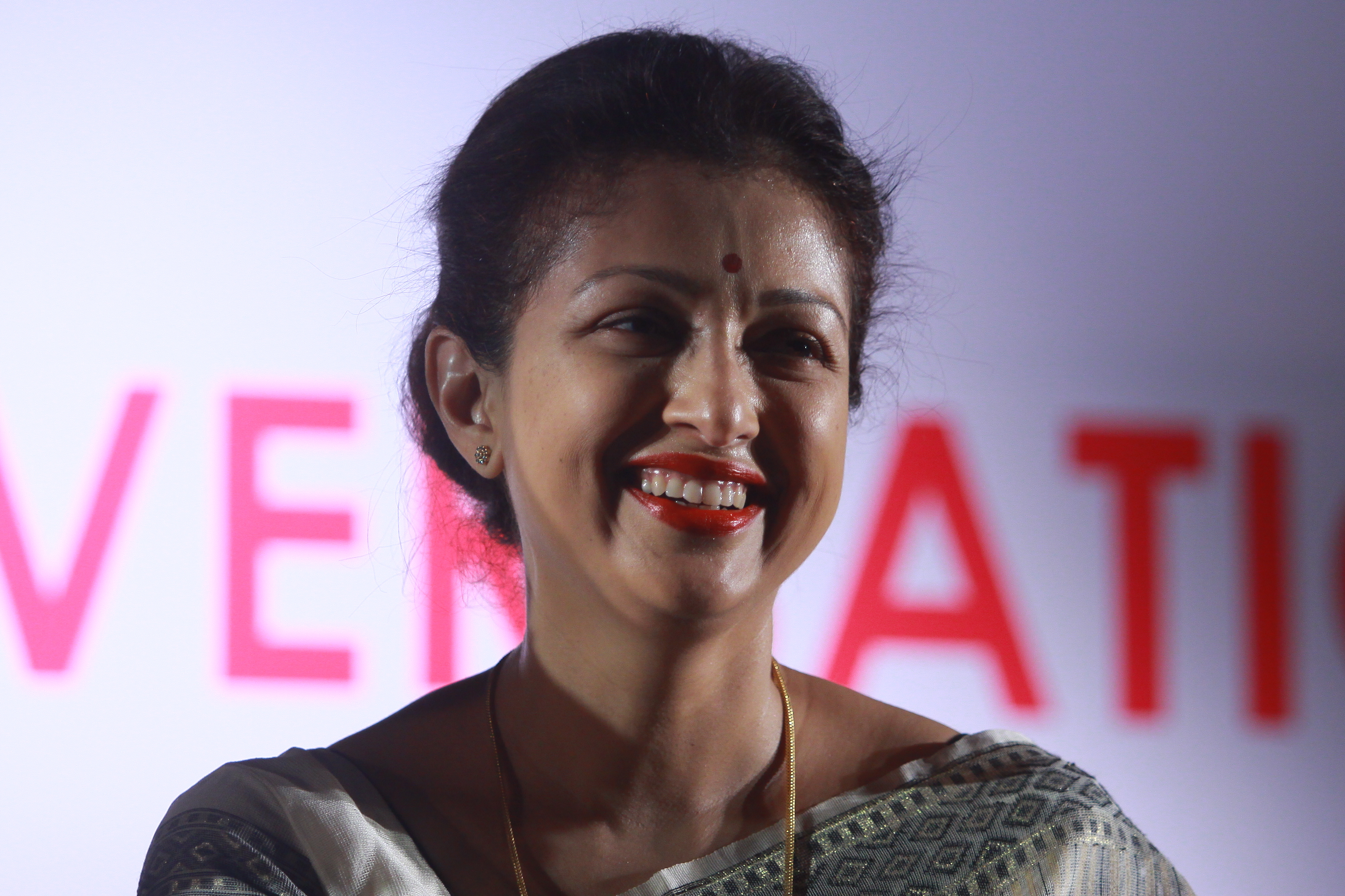
Gautami

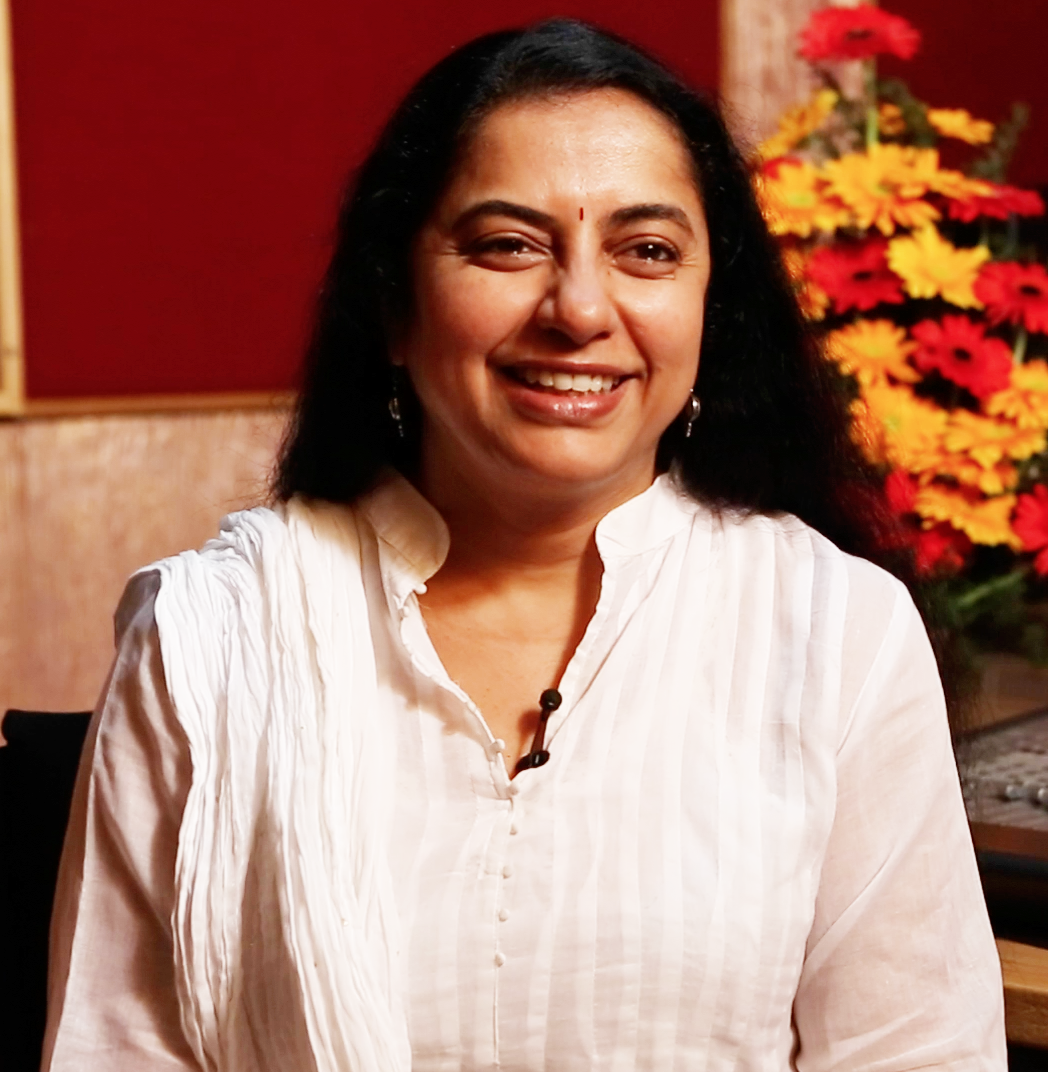
Suhasini Maniratnam

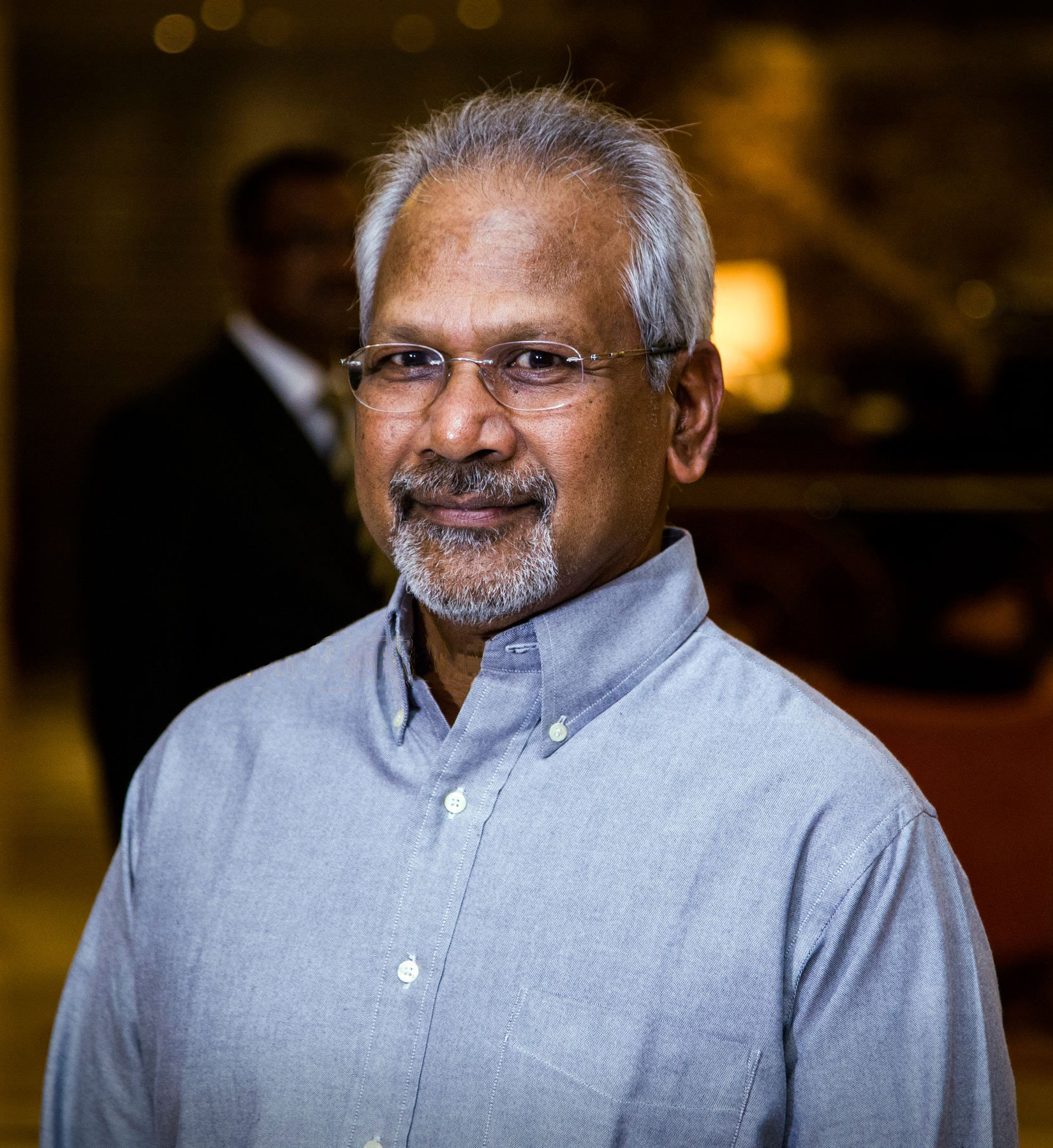
Mani Ratnam

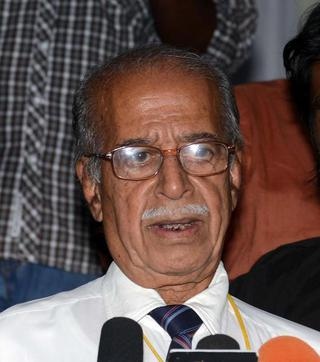
Chandrahasan

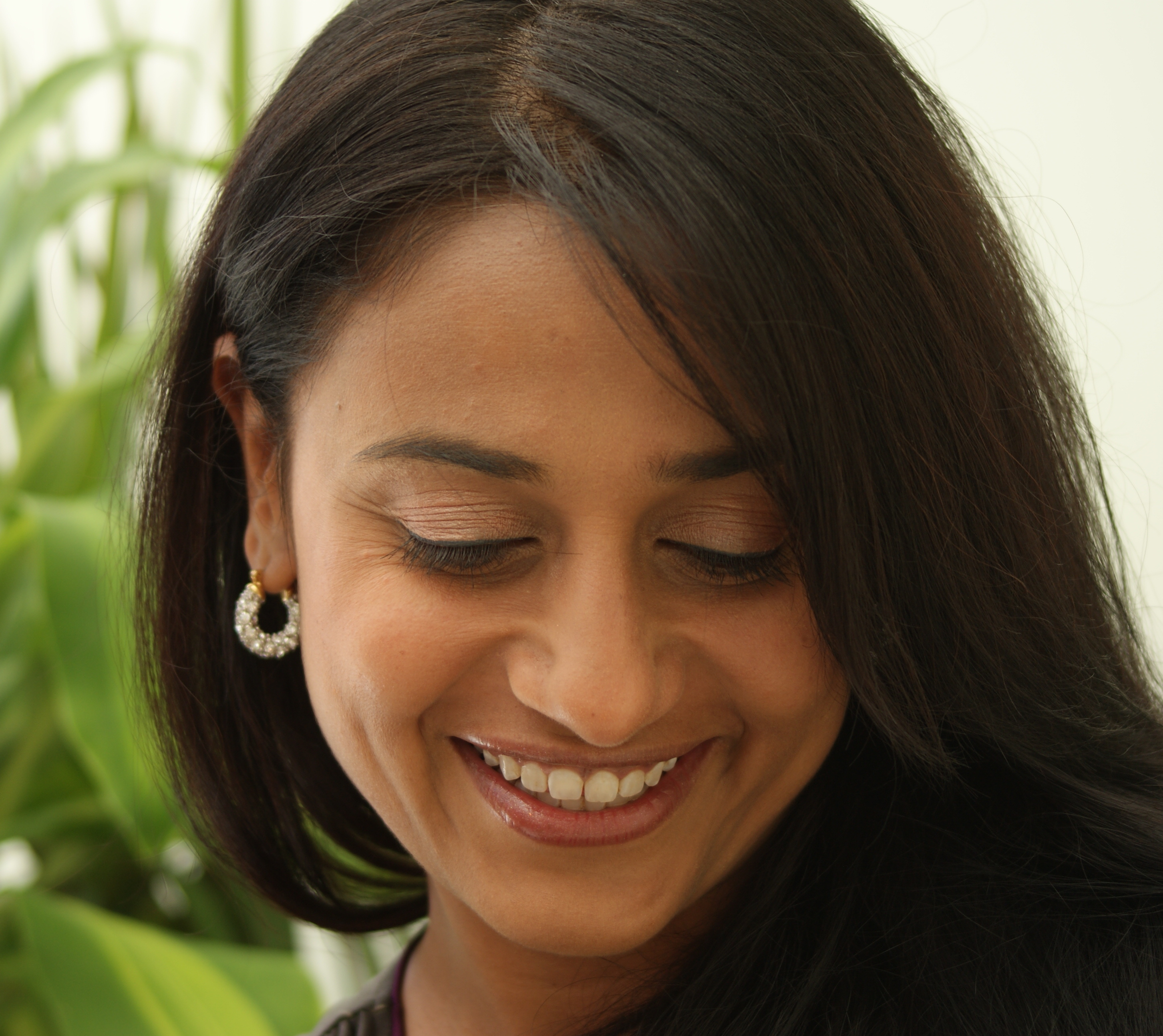
Anu Hasan

== J ==
=== Jaffrey family ===
- Ishtiaq Jaffrey a.k.a Jagdeep (actor and comedian, famous for Surma Bhopali in Sholay)
  - Javed Jaffrey (actor, comedian, host, son of Jagdeep)
    - Meezaan Jaffrey (actor, son of Javed and grandson of Jagdeep)
  - Naved Jaffrey (actor, dancer, host, son of Jagdeep, brother of Javed and uncle of Meezan)
  - Muskaan Jaffrey (actress, Half-sister of Javed and Naved Jaffrey)

=== Johar family ===
The family is related to the Chopra family through Hiroo Johar, the wife of filmmaker Yash Johar, who was the sister of film producer Yash Chopra.

- Yash Johar (film producer, founder of Dharma Productions)
  - Hiroo Yash Johar (film producer - wife of Yash Johar and sister of Yash Chopra)
  - Karan Johar (filmmaker, producer, television personality)
- I. S. Johar (actor, writer, producer, director - brother of Yash Johar)
  - Sonia Sahni (actress - former wife of I. S. Johar)

== K ==
=== Kapoor family (of Annu Kapoor) ===
- Annu Kapoor (actor, singer, director, radio disc jockey, television presenter)
- Ranjit Kapoor (actor - brother of Annu Kapoor)
  - Grusha Kapoor (actress - daughter of Ranjit Kapoor)
- Seema Kapoor (filmmaker and writer - sister of Annu Kapoor)
- Om Puri (actor - ex-husband of Seema Kapoor)

=== Kapoor family (of Jeetendra) ===
- Jeetendra a.k.a. Ravi Kapoor (actor)
  - Shobha Kapoor (wife of Jeetendra)
  - Tusshar Kapoor (actor – son of Jeetendra)
  - Ekta Kapoor (producer – daughter of Jeetendra)
- Nitin Kapoor (cousin of Jeetendra)
  - Jayasudha (actress and politician – wife of Nitin Kapoor) (see Nidudavolu family)
  - Abhishek Kapoor (director and actor – nephew of Jeetendra)
  - R. Balasaraswati Devi (playback singer-aunt of Jayasudha)

=== Kapoor family (of Mahendra Kapoor) ===
- Mahendra Kapoor (playback singer)
  - Rohan Kapoor (actor and singer - son of Mahendra Kapoor)
    - Sidhant Kapoor (actor - son of Rohan Kapoor)

=== Kapoor family (of Prithviraj Kapoor) ===
The oldest family in the industry, the Kapoor family has been active in films since 1926, starting with Dewan Bisheswar Kapoor and his son Prithviraj Kapoor. His descendants have carried on with the career of film acting. Raj Kapoor, Shammi Kapoor, Shashi Kapoor, Rishi Kapoor, Randhir Kapoor, Karisma Kapoor, Kareena Kapoor, and Ranbir Kapoor are among the prominent members from the Kapoor clan. Others who tried their hand with at the trade include Rajiv Kapoor (Raj's son), and Karan Kapoor and Kunal Kapoor (Shashi's sons). Shashi Kapoor's daughter, Sanjana Kapoor, with brother Kunal, has been successfully running Prithvi Theatre, founded in 1944 by Prithviraj Kapoor.

Raj Kapoor married Krishna Malhotra, sister of actor Prem Nath from Malhotra family. Raj's grandson and Ritu Nanda's son, industrialist Nikhil Nanda, married Shweta Bachchan, daughter of Amitabh Bachchan from the Bachchan family. Raj's granddaughter Kareena Kapoor married Saif Ali Khan from the Pataudi family. Raj Kapoor's maternal cousin, singer Juggal Kishore Mehra, married actress Anwari Begum of the Agha family, the lead actor of the first Punjabi film Heer Ranjha.

Film personalities of Kapoor family (of Prithviraj Kapoor)
1st generation	2nd generation	3rd generation	4th generation	Career	Born	Died	Relation
Prithviraj Kapoor				Actor	1906	1971	Son of Dewan Basheshwarnath Kapoor
Ramsarni Mehra Kapoor					1908	1972	Married to Prithviraj Kapoor
	Raj Kapoor			Actor, producer, director	1924	1988	Son of Prithviraj Kapoor and Ramsarni Mehra Kapoor
	Krishna Raj Kapoor				1930	2018	Married to Raj Kapoor
		Randhir Kapoor		Actor, producer, director	1947		Son of Raj Kapoor and Krishna Raj Kapoor
		Babita		Actress	1947		Married to Randhir Kapoor, Daughter of Hari Shivdasani
			Karisma Kapoor	Actress	1974		Daughter of Randhir Kapoor and Babita Kapoor
			Kareena Kapoor	Actress, producer	1980		Daughter of Randhir Kapoor and Babita Kapoor; married to Saif Ali Khan - See Pataudi family
		Ritu Kapoor Nanda		Entrepreneur	1948	2020	Daughter of Raj Kapoor and Krishna Raj Kapoor; married to Rajan Nanda
		Rishi Kapoor		Actor, producer, director	1952	2020	Son of Raj Kapoor and Krishna Raj Kapoor
		Neetu Kapoor		Actress	1958		Married to Rishi Kapoor
			Ranbir Kapoor	Actor, producer	1982		Son of Rishi Kapoor and Neetu Kapoor
			Alia Bhatt	Actress, producer	1993		Married to Ranbir Kapoor
		Rajiv Kapoor		Actor, producer, director	1962	2021	Son of Raj Kapoor and Krishna Raj Kapoor
	Shammi Kapoor			Actor, producer, director	1931	2011	Son of Prithviraj Kapoor and Ramsarni Mehra Kapoor
	Geeta Bali			Actress	1930	1965	1st wife of Shammi Kapoor
		Aditya Raj Kapoor		Actor, producer	1956		Son of Shammi Kapoor and Geeta Bali
	Shashi Kapoor			Actor, producer, director	1938	2017	Son of Prithviraj Kapoor and Ramsarni Mehra Kapoor
	Jennifer Kendal			Actress	1934	1984	Wife of Shashi Kapoor
		Kunal Kapoor		Actor, Ad-Film Director	1959		Son of Shashi Kapoor and Jennifer Kendal
			Zahan Kapoor	Actor	1992		Son of Kunal Kapoor and Sheena Sippy
		Karan Kapoor		Actor, model, photographer	1962		Son of Shashi Kapoor and Jennifer Kendal
		Sanjana Kapoor		Actress	1967		Daughter of Shashi Kapoor and Jennifer Kendal; married to wildlife documentary maker Valmik Thapar (nephew of historian Romila Thapar)
Trilok Kapoor				Actor	1912	1988	Son of Dewan Basheshwarnath Kapoor, father of Vijay Kapoor and Vicky Kapoor

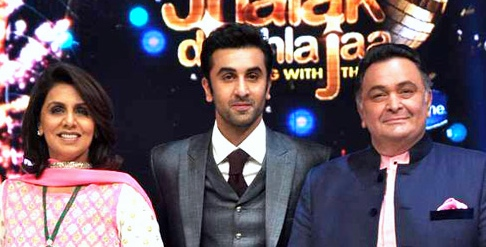
Neetu Kapoor, Ranbir Kapoor and Rishi Kapoor

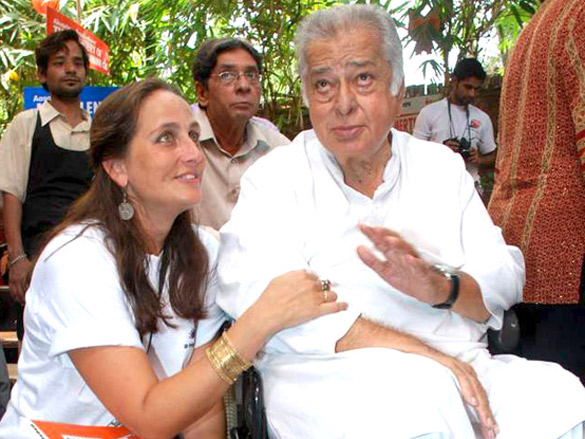
Shashi Kapoor and Sanjana Kapoor

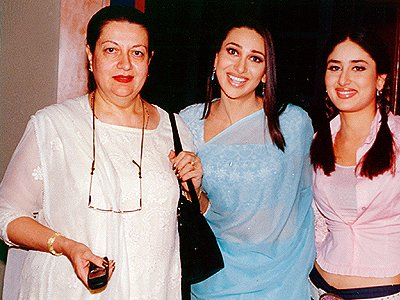
Babita, Karisma Kapoor and Kareena Kapoor

.

=== Kapoor family (of Surinder Kapoor) ===
Surinder Kapoor was the one who introduced his family to the world of Bollywood. Surinder Kapoor started his career as Geeta Bali's secretary and went on to become a producer. He also happens to be a distant cousin of Prithviraj Kapoor. He served as president of the Film & Television Producers Guild of India for six years. He married Nirmal Devi and has four children – Boney, Anil, Reena and Sanjay.

- Surinder Kapoor (film producer, distant relative of Kapoor family (of Prithviraj Kapoor) )
- Nirmal Kapoor (wife of Surinder Kapoor)
  - Boney Kapoor (film producer, eldest son of Surinder Kapoor)
  - Mona Shourie Kapoor (first wife of Boney Kapoor)
    - Arjun Kapoor (actor, son of Boney and his first wife Mona)
    - Anshula Kapoor (entrepreneur, daughter of Boney and his first wife Mona)
    - Rohan Thakkar (freelance screenwriter, husband of Anshula)
  - Sridevi (actress, second wife of Boney Kapoor)
    - Janhvi Kapoor (actress, daughter of Boney and his second wife Sridevi)
    - Khushi Kapoor (actress, daughter of Boney and his second wife Sridevi)
  - Anil Kapoor (actor, second son of Surinder Kapoor)
  - Sunita Bhavnani (costume designer, wife of Anil Kapoor, member of Burke-Bhavnani family)
    - Sonam Kapoor (actress, eldest daughter of Anil Kapoor)
    - Anand Ahuja (businessman, husband of Sonam)
    - Rhea Kapoor (film producer, second daughter of Anil Kapoor)
    - Karan Boolani (film maker, husband of Rhea)
    - Harsh Varrdhan Kapoor (actor, son of Anil Kapoor)
  - Sanjay Kapoor (actor, youngest son of Surinder Kapoor)
  - Maheep Sandhu (jewelry designer, wife of Sanjay Kapoor)
    - Shanaya Kapoor (actress, daughter of Sanjay Kapoor)
    - Jahaan Kapoor (son of Sanjay Kapoor)
  - Reena Kapoor Marwah (daughter of Surinder Kapoor)
  - Sandeep Marwah (film producer, husband of Reena Kapoor)
    - Akshay Marwah (entrepreneur, son of Reena Kapoor)
    - Aashita Relan (entrepreneur, wife of Akshay)
    - Mohit Marwah (actor, son of Reena Kapoor)
    - Antara Motiwala (fashion stylist, wife of Mohit)

=== Kapoor family (of Shakti Kapoor) ===
- Shakti Kapoor (Actor – husband of Shivangi Kolhapure)
- Shivangi Kolhapure (sister of actresses Padmini Kolhapure and Tejaswini Kolhapure and member of the Mangeshkar-Hardikar-Abhisheki-Kolhapure family)
  - Shraddha Kapoor (actress – daughter of Shakti Kapoor and Shivangi Kolhapure)
  - Siddhanth Kapoor (actor – son of Shakti Kapoor and Shivangi Kolhapure)

=== Kapur–Pathak–Shah–Pahwa family ===
- Shanta Gandhi (1917–2002) – theatre director, dancer (sister of Dina Pathak)
- Dina Pathak (née Gandhi) (1922–2002) – Theatre and film actor (mother of Ratna Pathak and Supriya Pathak)
  - Ratna Pathak Shah (born 1957) – television and film actress, elder daughter of Dina Pathak, wife of Naseeruddin Shah
  - Naseeruddin Shah (born 1950) – film and theater actor (formerly married Parveen Murad, born as Manara Sikri, sister of actor Surekha Sikri) and a part of the Shah family
    - Imaad Shah (b.1986) – singer, songwriter, film actor (son of Naseeruddin Shah and Ratna Pathak)
    - Vivaan Shah (born 1990) – film actor (son of Naseruddin Shah and Ratna Pathak)
    - Mohommed Ali Shah (born 1979) – theatre and film actor; son of Zameer Uddin Shah and thus nephew of Naseeruddin Shah
  - Supriya Pathak (born 1961) – theatre and film actress, younger daughter of Dina Pathak, wife of Pankaj Kapur
  - Pankaj Kapur (born 1954) – theatre, television and film actor, formerly married to Neelima Azeem
    - Sanah Kapur (born 1993) – television and film actress; daughter of Pankaj Kapur and Supriya Pathak; wife of Mayank Pahwa
  - Neelima Azeem (born 1959) – television and film actress, married three times, to actors Pankaj Kapur and Rajesh Khattar, and vocalist Raza Ali Khan
    - Shahid Kapoor (born 1981) – film actor (son of Pankaj Kapur and Neelima Azeem)
    - Ishaan Khatter (born 1995) – film actor (son of Rajesh Khattar and Neelima Azeem)
  - Manoj Pahwa (born 1963) – film and television actor (married to Seema Pahwa, father-in-law of Sanah Kapur)
  - Seema Pahwa (born 1962) – film and television actress and a filmmaker
    - Mayank Pahwa – film actor (spouse of Sanah Kapur and son of Manoj Pahwa and Seema Pahwa)

=== Kaif family ===
- Katrina Kaif (Film actress, married into Kaushal family)
- Vicky Kaushal (Film actor - husband of Katrina, member of Kaushal family)
- Isabelle Kaif (Film actress, younger sister of Katrina, sister-in-law of Vicky)

=== Kaushal family ===
- Shyam Kaushal (Action director - winner of 5 Filmfare Awards for Best Action Director)
- Veena Kaushal (Housewife - wife of Shyam Kaushal)
  - Vicky Kaushal (Film actor - elder son of Shyam Kaushal, married into Kaif family)
  - Katrina Kaif (Film actress - wife of Vicky Kaushal, member of Kaif family)
  - Sunny Kaushal (Film actor - younger son of Shyam Kaushal)

=== Khan family (of Shah Rukh Khan) ===
- Shah Rukh Khan (Film Actor, Film Producer, and Businessman, Son of Mir Taj Mohammed Khan) born on 2 November 1965
- Gauri Khan (Film Producer, Interior Designer, Businesswoman) born 1970, married Shah Rukh Khan in 1991
  - Aryan Khan (Entrepreneur, Director, Screenwriter, Filmmaker - elder son of Shah Rukh Khan, born 1997)
  - Suhana Khan (Actress - daughter of Shah Rukh Khan, born 2000)
  - Abram Khan (Youngest child of Shah Rukh Khan, born 2013)

=== Khan family (of Feroz Khan) ===
Feroz Khan was an actor, film editor, producer and director from the 1960s till 2007. He introduced his son Fardeen Khan in 1998 in the film Prem Aggan for which Fardeen won the Filmfare Best Debut Award. Mumtaz was a popular actress in the 1960s–70s. She left the industry after her marriage to Mayur Madhvani.

- Feroz Khan
  - Fardeen Khan, son of Feroz
  - Natasha Wadhwani, married to Fardeen, (daughter of Mumtaz, creating connection to Randhawa family)
  - Laila Khan-Furniturewala daughter of Feroz Khan, wife of Farhan Furniturewala (ex-husband of Pooja Bedi), step-mother of film actress Alaya Furniturewala.
- Sanjay Khan, younger brother of Feroz
  - Zayed Khan, son of Sanjay
  - Simone Khan Arora, daughter of Sanjay, (married to businessman Ajay Arora)
  - Farah Khan Ali, daughter of Sanjay,(ex-wife of DJ Aqeel)
  - Sussanne Khan, daughter of Sanjay, (ex-wife of Hrithik Roshan, creating a connection to Roshan family due to their sons Hrehaan and Hridhaan)
- Akbar Khan, younger brother of Feroz and Sanjay

Film personalities of Khan family (of Feroz Khan)
1st generation	2nd generation	3rd generation	4th generation	Career	Born	Died	Relation
Feroz Khan				Actor, Director, Producer	1939	2009	Brother of Sanjay and Akbar Khan; Father of Fardeen Khan
	Fardeen Khan			Actor	1974		Son of Feroz Khan; Cousin of Zayed Khan
Sanjay Khan				Actor, Director, Producer	1941		Brother of Feroz Khan and Akbar Khan
	Zayed Khan			Actor	1980		Son of Sanjay Khan; Cousin of Fardeen Khan
	Sussanne Khan			Fashion designer	1978		Daughter of Sanjay Khan; Cousin of Fardeen Khan; ex-wife of Hrithik Roshan and mother of Hrehaan and Hridhaan from Roshan family
Akbar Khan				Director	1949		Brother of Feroz and Sanjay Khan

=== Khan family (of Salim Khan) ===
Story and script writer Salim Khan has written and produced some of the most successful Bollywood films. He formed a pair with Javed Akhtar and began writing as Salim–Javed. The duo have written many commercially and critically successful movies all through the 1970s and 1980s like Yaadon Ki Baraat (Nasir Hussain), Deewaar (Yash Chopra), Dostana (Yash Johar), Sholay (Ramesh Sippy), Mr. India (Shekhar Kapoor) and Don – The Chase Begins Again (Farhan Akhtar). His eldest son, Salman, made his film debut at the age of 22 with Biwi Ho To Aisi (1988) and went on to become one of the most successful superstars of Indian cinema. His second son, Arbaaz Khan, is a successful actor and filmmaker whose films include Dabangg and Dabangg 2. His third son, Sohail Khan, is an actor and film maker. His elder daughter Alvira is married to the actor Atul Agnihotri. It is only his second daughter Arpita who has kept away from the field of films.

Salim Khan met and married Sushila Charak, a Hindu woman from a Marathi family. She took the name 'Salma Khan' and they have four children (three sons and a daughter). In later life, Salim Khan married Helen, and took her as his second wife while still married to Sushila/Salma. This arrangement was accepted by both ladies, and by all four of his children by his first wife. The family then adopted a girl, Arpita Khan, who was formally adopted by Helen and raised amid the entire family in their family home in Galaxy Apartments, Bandstand Promenade, Mumbai. Eventually, the two daughters (Alvira and Arpita) married and left to raise their own families, while two of the three sons (Arbaaz and Sohail) married. They live together, as per the Joint family traditions.

- Salim Khan - (Actor, Scriptwriter) (born 1935)
- Salma Khan (née Sushila Charak) (first wife of Salim Khan) (born 8 December 1942)
  - Salman Khan (eldest son of Salim Khan and Sushila Charak Khan) (born 1965)
  - Arbaaz Khan (director, producer, writer and actor – second son of Salim Khan and Sushila Charak Khan) (born 1967)
  - Shura Khan, wife of Arbaaz Khan
  - Malaika Arora (model and actress), Ex-wife of Arbaaz Khan and sister of actress Amrita Arora
  - Sohail Khan (director, producer, writer and actor – third son of Salim Khan and Sushila Charak Khan) (born 1970)
  - Seema Kiran Sajdeh, Ex- wife of Sohail Khan, Designer, Starring in Fabulous lives of bollywood wives.
  - Alvira Khan Agnihotri, daughter of Salim Khan and Sushila Charak Khan, married to Atul Agnihotri
  - Arpita Khan Sharma, adopted daughter of Salim Khan, married to Aayush Sharma
- Helen (second wife of Salim Khan) (born 1938)
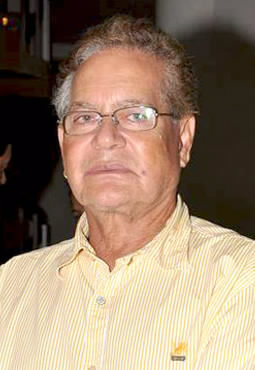
Salim Khan

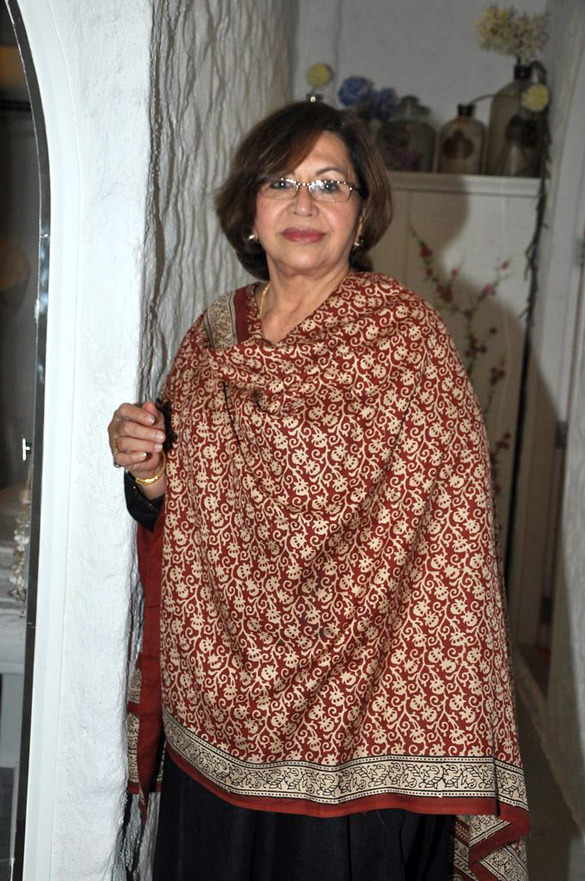
Helen, second wife of Salim Khan

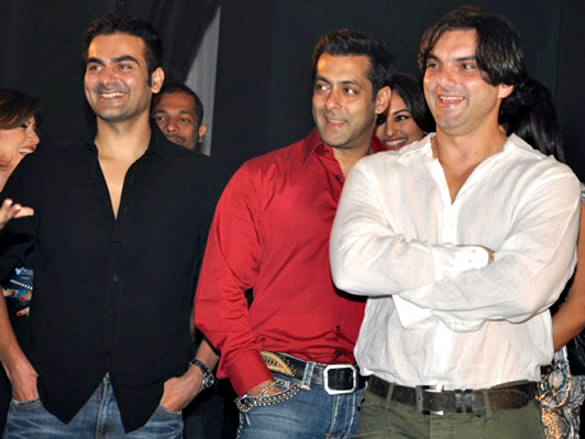
Arbaaz, Salman and Sohail

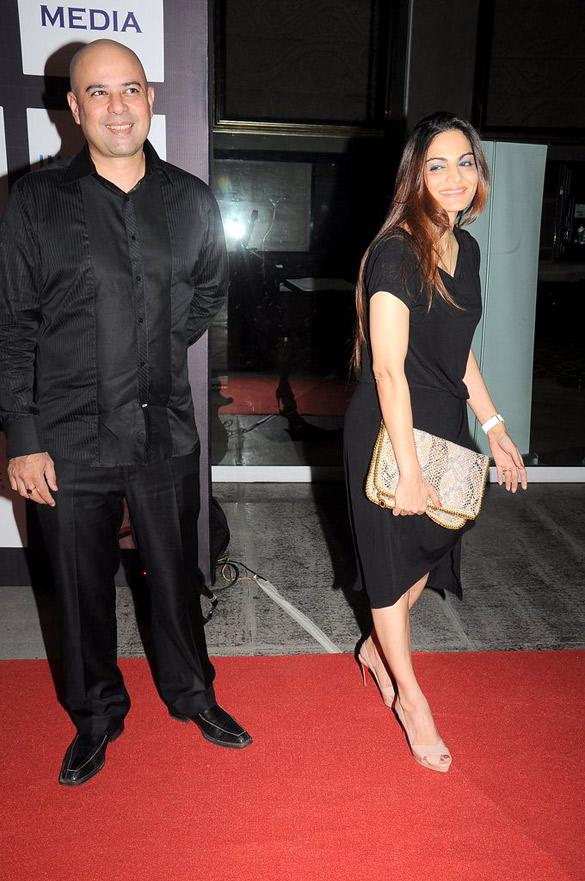
Atul Agnihotri, actor, husband of Alvira Khan (R)

=== Khan–Banu family (of Yusuf Khan aka Dilip Kumar, Saira Banu, and Nasir Khan) ===
Dilip Kumar was born as Muhammad Yusuf Khan in 1922, and became one of India's most acclaimed actors. His wife Saira Banu is also a successful actress in Bollywood. His brother Nasir Khan, brother-in-law K. Asif and nephew Ayub Khan are among those who followed him into films, and his wife Saira Banu is also related to several film personalities.

- Dilip Kumar (actor, producer)
- Saira Banu (actress) – wife of Dilip Kumar

==== Dilip Kumar's relatives ====
- K. Asif (filmmaker) – his wife, Akhtar Asif, was the sister of Dilip Kumar. His other wife was actress Nigar Sultana.
  - Nazir Ahmed Khan (actor), cousin and also brother-in-law of K. Asif; his first wife Sikandara Begum was K. Asif's sister
- Nasir Khan (actor) – brother of Dilip Kumar, father of actor Ayub Khan.
- Begum Para (actress) – wife of Nasir Khan.
  - Ayub Khan (actor) – son of Nasir Khan and Begum Para, nephew of Dilip Kumar, ex-husband of Niharika Bhasin with whom he has 2 daughters
  - Niharika Bhasin - ex-wife of Ayub Khan
  - Arjun Bhasin - ex-brother-in-law of Ayub Khan and brother of Nihaarika Bhasin
- Zarina Sultana- sister of Begum Para
  - Rukhsana Sultana (social activist) – daughter of Zarina Haque (sister of Begum Para)
    - Amrita Singh (actress) – daughter of Rukhsana Sultana and Shivinder Singh Virk; ex-wife of actor Saif Ali Khan (see Pataudi family)
      - Sara Ali Khan (actress) - daughter of Amrita Singh and Saif Ali Khan

==== Saira Banu's relatives ====
- Chamiyan Bai (singer), mother of Naseem Banu and grandmother of actress Saira Banu.
  - Naseem Banu (actress), mother of Saira Banu and grandmother of actress Shaheen Bano.
  - Mian Ehsan-ul-Haq (producer, director), father of Saira Banu and Sultan Ahmed.
    - Saira Banu (actress) – wife of Dilip Kumar
      - Sumeet Saigal (ex-husband of Shaheen Banu, husband of Farah who is the sister of Tabu)
        - Farah wife of Sumeet
          - Tabu sister of Farah
        - Shaheen Banu, Ex-Wife of Sumeet
      - Sayyeshaa (actress, daughter of Sumeet Saigal and Shaheen Banu Saigal)
        - Arya (actor, producer, husband of Sayyeshaa, brother of Sathya)
          - Sathya (actor, brother of Arya)

=== Khan–Hussain family (of Nasir Hussain) ===
The Khan–Hussain family starts with Nasir Hussain, who is the eldest man in the family. He is a veteran film writer, producer and director and made his writing debut with the 1953 super hit, Anarkali for Filmistan studios, where he joined as a freelancer. Nasir later went on to start his own production house named Nasir Hussain Films and made evergreen cult films like Teesri Manzil and Yaadon Ki Baaraat. Nasir Hussain's younger brother, Tahir Hussain, is also a filmmaker and has been a producer for a number of films. Nasir Hussain has two children; an elder son Mansoor Khan, and a younger daughter, Nuzhat Khan. Nuzhat Khan married a Bengali Hindu, Anil Pal, an engineer, and had one child, Imran Khan. Tahir Hussain and his wife Zeenat Hussain have four children; Farhat Khan, Aamir Khan, Faisal Khan, and Nikhat Khan. Nasir Hussain launched both Mansoor Khan and Aamir Khan with the 1988 blockbuster Qayamat Se Qayamat Tak, which was produced by Nassir Hussain Films and co-written by the two brothers in their younger days. Faisal Khan is a former actor. Mansoor Khan and Aamir Khan later launched the former's nephew, Imran Khan, with Jaane Tu... Ya Jaane Na in 2008. The film was made under the Aamir Khan Productions banner and was a huge hit.

- Tahir Hussain (producer, director and screenwriter – father of Aamir Khan)
  - Aamir Khan (actor, director and producer)
    - Junaid Khan (actor – first born son of Aamir Khan from his first wife Reena Dutta)
  - Kiran Rao (producer, screenwriter and director – former wife of Aamir Khan). Actress Aditi Rao Hydari is a cousin of Kiran Rao.
  - Faisal Khan (actor – brother of Aamir Khan)
  - Nikhat Khan (producer – sister of Aamir Khan)
- Nasir Hussain (producer, director and screenwriter – uncle of Aamir Khan and grandfather to Imran Khan and Zayn Marie Khan)
  - Mansoor Khan (producer, director and screenwriter – cousin to Aamir Khan, father of Zayn Marie Khan and uncle of Imran Khan)
    - Zayn Marie Khan (actress - daughter of Mansoor Khan)
  - Raj Zutshi (actor – step-father of Imran Khan as the second husband of Nuzhat Khan Zutshi)
    - Imran Khan (actor – grandson of Nasir Hussain, son of Nuzhat Khan Zutshi, and step-son of Raj Zutshi)
- Anize Khan (sister of Nasir and Tahir Hussain)
  - Tariq Khan (actor – son of Anize Khan, cousin to Aamir Khan and uncle of Imran Khan)
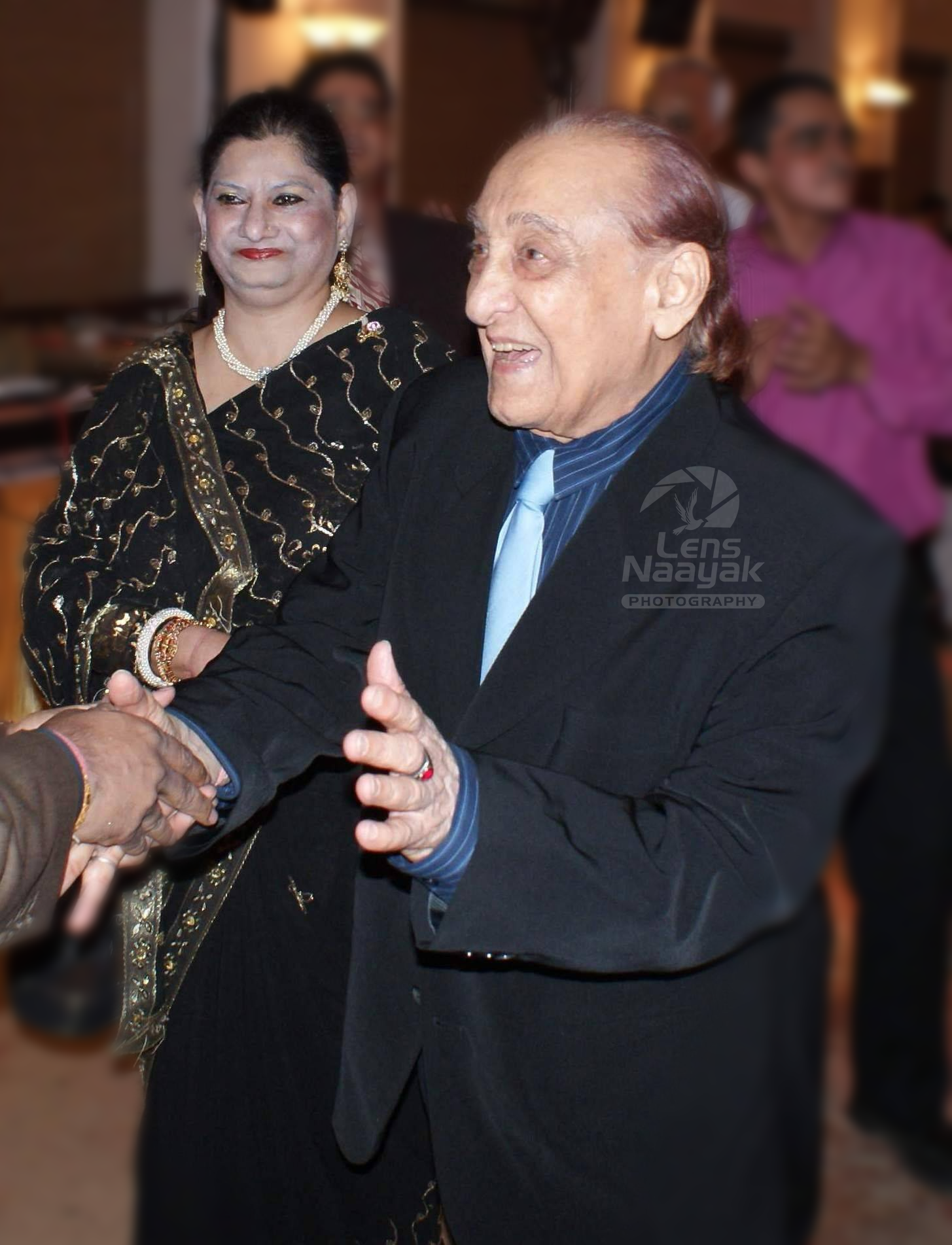
Tahir Hussain

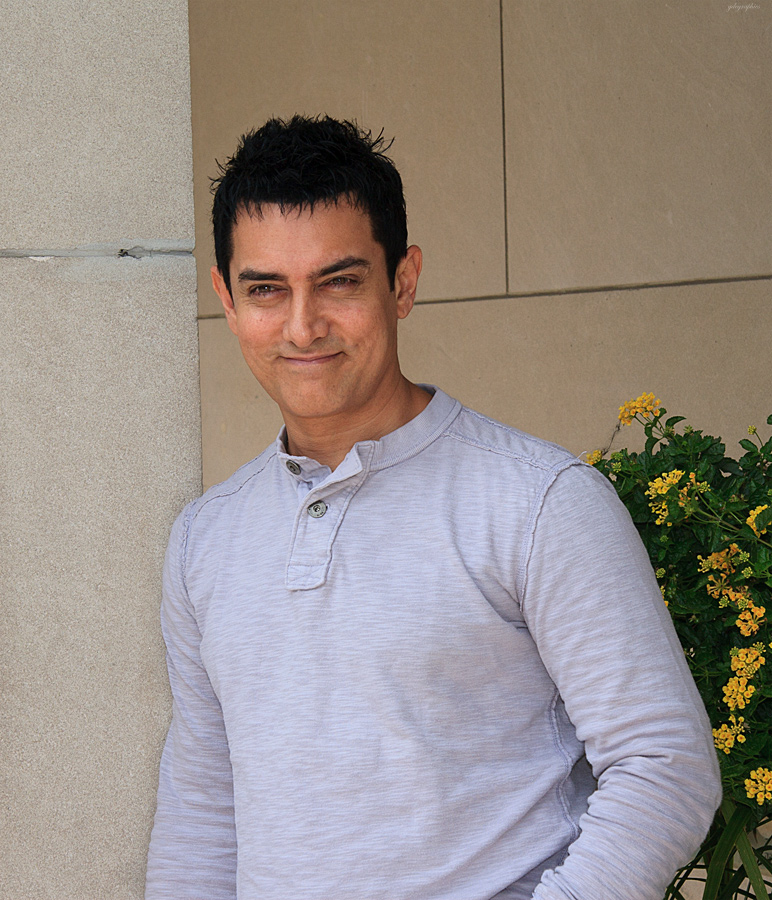
Aamir Khan

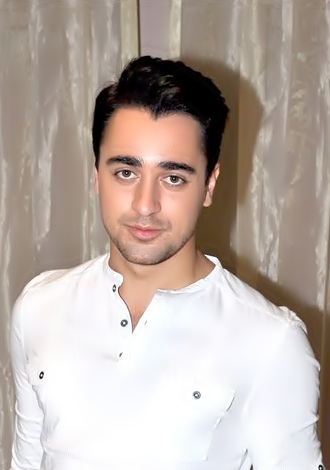
Imran Khan

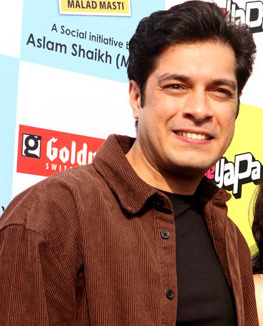
Junaid Khan

=== Khan family (of Zakaria Khan) ===
The family line starts with actor Zakaria Khan, known by his screen name as Jayant. His sons are actors Amjad Khan, (popular for his role of Gabbar Singh in the film Sholay) and Imtiaz Khan (worked in films like Yaadon Ki Baaraat, Dharmatma, Dayavan).

- Jayant (Zakaria Khan)
  - Amjad Khan, son of Zakaria Khan. He married Shehla Khan.
    - Shadaab Khan, son of Amjad Khan and Shehla Khan
    - Seemaab Khan, son of Amjad Khan and Shehla Khan
    - Zafar Karachiwala, husband of Ahlam Khan
  - Imtiaz Khan, son of Zakaria Khan.
  - Kruttika Desai, wife of Imtiaz Khan

=== Khan family (of Nafisa Rizvi Khan aka Jiah Khan) ===
- Tayyab Hussain Rizvi (film distributor and producer) – father of Ali Rizvi Khan, Sangeeta, Kaveeta and Hina. Jiah Khan's paternal grandfather.
- Mehtab Rizvi (film producer and screenwriter) – mother of Ali Rizvi Khan, Sangeeta, Kaveeta and Hina. Jiah Khan's paternal grandmother and wife of Tayyab Hussain Rizvi.
  - Sangeeta (actress, producer and director) – sister of Ali Rizvi Khan, Kaveeta and Hina Rizvi.
  - Kaveeta (actress) – sister of Ali Rizvi Khan, Sangeeta and Hina Rizvi.
  - Hina Rizvi (actress) – sister of Ali Rizvi Khan, Kaveeta and Sangeeta.
  - Ammar Ahmed Khan (actor) – husband of Hina Rizvi.
  - Ali Rizvi Khan (film producer) – father of Jiah Khan and brother of Sangeeta, Kaveeta and Hina.
  - Rabiya Amin (actress) – mother of Jiah Khan and ex-wife of Ali Rizvi Khan.
    - Jiah Khan (actress and singer) – daughter of Ali Rizvi Khan and Rabiya Amin.
    - Karishma Khan – sister of Jiah Khan and daughter of Ali Rizvi Khan and Rabiya Amin.
    - Kavita Khan – sister of Jiah Khan and daughter of Ali Rizvi Khan and Rabiya Amin.

=== Khanna-Kapadia-Bhatia family ===
Khanna family starts with Rajesh Khanna (born Jatin Khanna;) he was a Bollywood actor, film producer and politician. He is referred to as the "first superstar" and the "original superstar" of Indian cinema. He starred in 15 consecutive solo hit films in the period 1969 to 1971, still an unbroken record.

Rajesh Khanna and Dimple Kapadia's daughters Twinkle Khanna, and Rinkle Khanna have also acted in the industry. Twinkle Khanna left the industry after her marriage to actor Akshay Kumar.

- Rajesh Khanna + Dimple Kapadia (actress – wife of Rajesh Khanna)
  - Twinkle Khanna (actress – eldest daughter of Rajesh Khanna and Dimple Kapadia)
  - Akshay Kumar (actor and producer – husband of Twinkle Khanna, son-in-law of Rajesh Khanna and Dimple Kapadia)
  - Rinke Khanna (actress – younger daughter of Rajesh Khanna and Dimple Kapadia)
- Simple Kapadia (costume designer and actress – sister of Dimple Kapadia)
  - Karan Kapadia (actor – son of Simple Khanna)
- Reem Kapadia ( actress – sister of Dimple Kapadia)
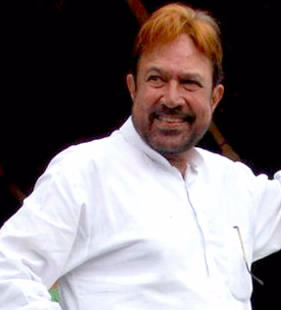
Rajesh Khanna

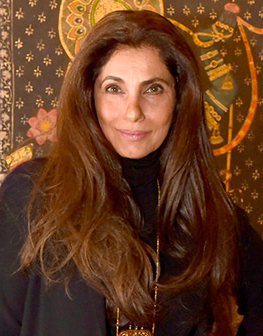
Dimple Kapadia

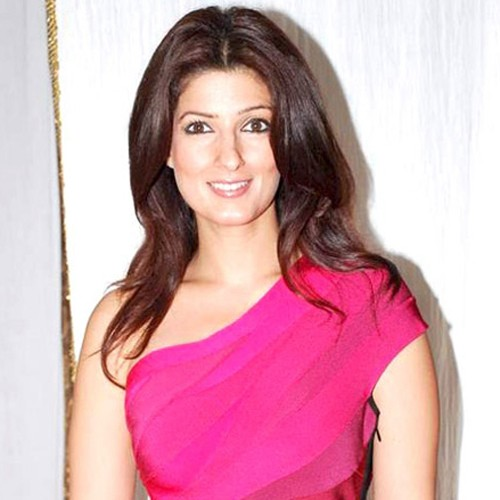
Twinkle Khanna

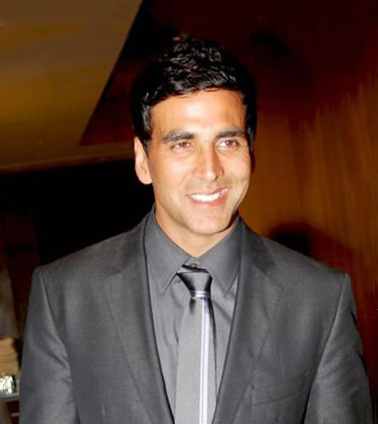
Akshay Kumar

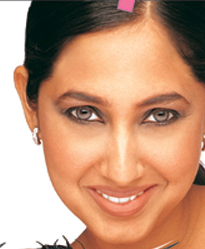
Rinke Khanna

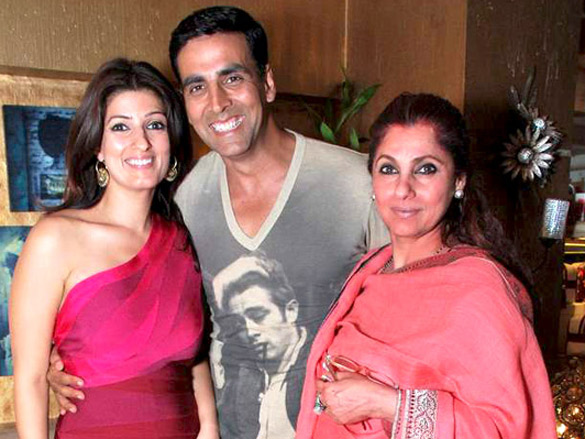
Members of the Khanna family

=== Khanna family (of Vinod Khanna) ===
Vinod Khanna was a popular and successful actor in the film industry in the 1970s and 1980s. His sons Akshaye and Rahul both pursued a film career.

- Vinod Khanna
  - Rahul Khanna (eldest son of Vinod Khanna and Gitanjali Taleyarkhan)
  - Akshaye Khanna (youngest son of Vinod Khanna and Gitanjali Taleyarkhan)

=== Khote family ===
Durga Khote was a Dadasaheb Phalke Award recipient known for her performances in Mughal-e-Azam, Bobby, Bidaai etc.

- Durga Khote
  - Vijaya Mehta (actress, daughter-in-law of Durga Khote and Wife of Harin Khote)
    - Anahita Uberoi (actress, daughter of Vijaya Mehta from her second marriage)
  - Shubha Khote (actress and niece to Durga Khote)
    - Bhavana Balsavar (actress, daughter of Shubha Khote, wife of Karan shah)
  - Viju Khote (actor and nephew to Durga Khote)

=== Kher family ===
The Kher family includes the actors Anupam Kher and Kirron Kher. Their son is actor Sikandar Kher. Anupam has starred in the international hit Bend It Like Beckham. He recently won the best actor award given by the Karachi International Film Festival for Maine Gandhi Ko Nahin Mara (2005). Kirron Kher won the Bronze Leopard Award given by the Locarno International Film Festival for Khamosh Pani: Silent Waters (2003).

- Anupam Kher
- Kirron Kher (actress – wife of Anupam Kher)
  - Sikandar Kher (actor – son of Kirron Kher from first marriage)
- Raju Kher (actor – brother of Anupam Kher)
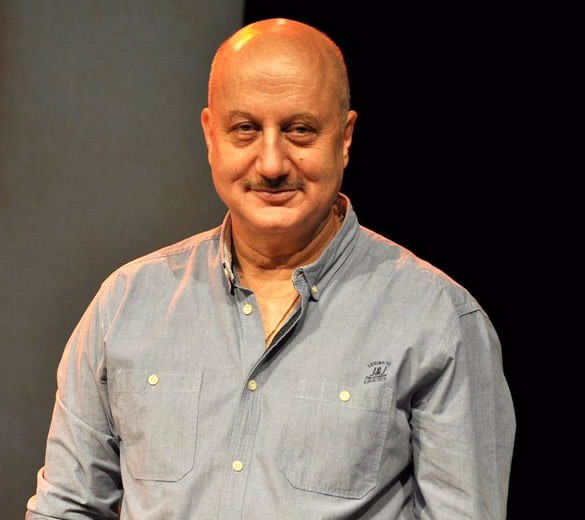
Anupam Kher

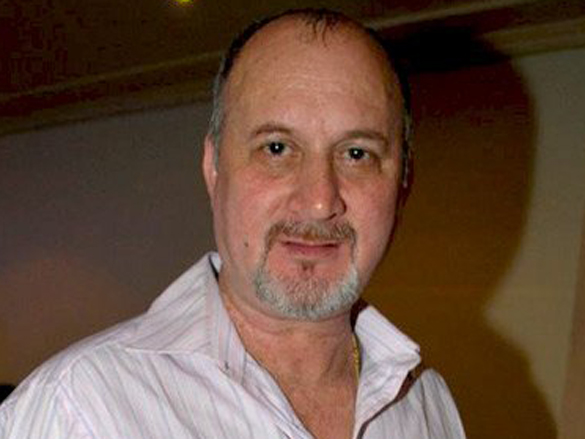
Raju Kher

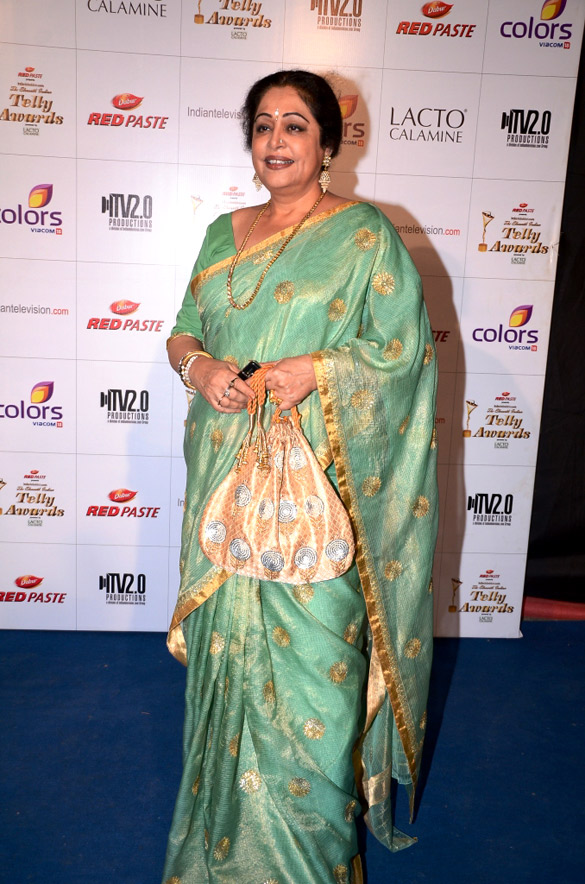
Kirron Kher

=== Khurrana/Khurana family ===
- Ayushmann Khurrana – actor, singer, writer.
- Aparshakti Khurana (actor, singer – brother of Ayushmann Khurrana).

=== Kumar family ===
Gulshan Kumar was the founder of the T-Series (Super Cassettes Industries Ltd.), the best known as music label in India, and an Indian Bollywood movie producer.

- Gulshan Kumar
  - Bhushan Kumar (Businessman, film and music producer – son of Gulshan Kumar) + Divya Khosla Kumar (actress, film producer – wife of Bhushan Kumar)
  - Khushalii Kumar (actress, fashion designer – Younger daughter of Gulshan Kumar)
  - Tulsi Kumar (singer – elder daughter of Gulshan Kumar)
- Krishan Kumar (film producer – younger brother of Gulshan Kumar) + Tanya Singh (actress – wife of Krishan Kumar)

Konidela family

- Konidela Venkat Rao – father of Chiranjeevi, Nagendra Babu, and Pawan Kalyan
- Anjana Devi – mother of Chiranjeevi, Nagendra Babu, and Pawan Kalyan
  - Chiranjeevi – Indian actor, former Minister of Tourism, and one of the biggest stars in Telugu cinema (son of Venkat Rao and Anjana Devi)
    - Surekha Konidela – wife of Chiranjeevi
      - Sushmita Konidela – costume designer (daughter of Chiranjeevi & Surekha)
      - Srija Konidela – entrepreneur (daughter of Chiranjeevi & Surekha)
      - Ram Charan – actor and producer known for Magadheera, Rangasthalam, and RRR (son of Chiranjeevi & Surekha)
  - Nagendra Babu – actor, producer, and founder of Anjana Productions (son of Venkat Rao and Anjana Devi)
    - Varun Tej – actor known for Fidaa and Ghazi (son of Nagendra Babu & Padmaja)
      - Niharika Konidela – actress and producer (daughter of Nagendra Babu & Padmaja)
  - Pawan Kalyan – actor and founder of Jana Sena Party, known for Gabbar Singh and Attarintiki Daredi (son of Venkat Rao and Anjana Devi
    - Renu Desai – actress (second wife of Pawan Kalyan)
    - Anna Lezhneva – wife of Pawan Kalyan
- Extended family (Allu family – related through marriage)
  - Allu Aravind – producer (brother-in-law of Chiranjeevi; husband of Chiranjeevi’s sister)
    - Allu Arjun – actor known for Pushpa, Ala Vaikunthapurramuloo
    - Allu Sirish – actor

Extended family (Panja family – related through marriage)

- Sai Durgha Tej – actor known for Supreme, Virupaksha, and Republic (nephew of Chiranjeevi; son of Vijaya Durga)
- Panja Vaisshnav Tej – actor known for Uppena and Konda Polam (younger brother of Sai Dharam Tej; son of Vijaya Durga)

=== Kothare family ===
- Amber Kothare – Marathi theater artist and film producer
- Saroj Kothare – colorist and producer (wife of Amber Kothare)
  - Mahesh Kothare – renowned Indian filmmaker, actor, and producer known for Masoom (1996) (son of Amber and Saroj Kothare)
  - Nilima Kothare – (wife of Mahesh Kothare)
    - Adinath Kothare – actor and filmmaker known for 83 and Paani (son of Mahesh and Nilima Kothare)
    - Urmilla Kothare – film and television actress (wife of Adinath Kothare)

== L ==
=== Lulla family ===
Mr. Arjun Lulla was the founder of Eros International, best known for film distribution and production in India.

- Arjan Lulla, founded Eros International in 1977, life president of the company
  - Kishore Lulla, chairman and director of Eros International plc, the first Indian Media & entertainment company listed on New York stock exchange; also known for being the biggest overseas Bollywood distributor
  - Sunil Lulla, chairman and executive director of Eros International; produced over 40 films for the company including several hits
    - Krishika Lulla, wife of Sunil Lulla; Bollywood producer
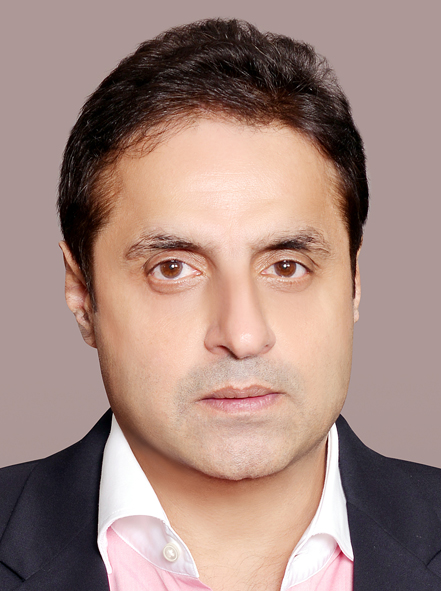
Sunil Lulla

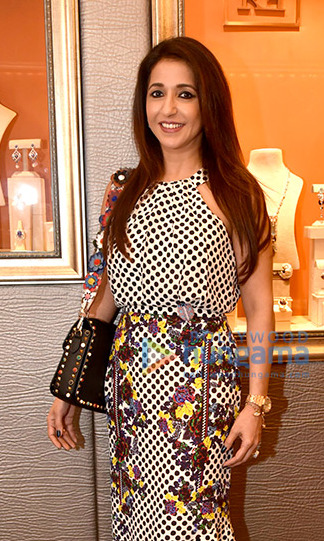
Krishika Lulla

== M ==
=== Mumtazullah Khan family ===
- Uzra Butt - sister of Zohra Sehgal
- Zohra Sehgal - sister of Uzra Butt
- Kiran Segal - daughter of Zohra Sehgal
- Samiya Mumtaz - grandniece of Zohra Sehgal and Uzra Butt
- Khawar Mumtaz - niece of Zohra Sehgal and Uzra Butt
- Hajrah Begum - sister of Zohra Sehgal and Uzra Butt
- Z. A. Ahmed - husband of Hajrah Begum
- Hamida Saiduzzafar - cousin of Zohra Sehgal and Uzra Butt
- Ayesha Raza Mishra - niece of Zohra Sehgal and Uzra Butt
- Kumud Mishra - Husband of Ayesha Raza Mishra
- Ismat Chughtai - cousin of Zohra Sehgal and Uzra Butt
- Sheikh Abdullah - father of Khurshid Mirza and Rashid Jahan
- Waheed Jahan Begum - mother of Khurshid Mirza and Rashid Jahan
- Rashid Jahan - daughter of Sheikh Abdullah and Waheed Jahan Begum
- Begum Khurshid Mirza - daughter of Sheikh Abdullah and Waheed Jahan Begum
- Salman Haider - nephew of Zohra Sehgal and Uzra Butt
- Navina Najat Haidar - daughter of Salman Haider

=== Malhotra family ===
- Prem Nath (actor)
- Bina Rai (actress – wife of Prem Nath)
  - Prem Krishen (actor – son of Prem Nath and Bina Rai)
    - Siddharth P. Malhotra (film director - son of Prem Kishen)
- Rajendra Nath (actor – brother of Prem Nath)
- Narendra Nath (actor – brother of Prem Nath)
- Krishna Malhotra (sister of Prem Nath)
  - Raj Kapoor (actor - husband of Krishna Malhotra)
    - Randhir Kapoor (actor - son of Krishna & Raj Kapoor)
      - Babita (actress - wife of Randhir Kapoor)
      - Karisma Kapoor (actress - daughter of Babita & Randhir Kapoor)
      - Kareena Kapoor (actress - daughter of Babita & Randhir Kapoor)
        - Saif Ali Khan (actor - husband of Kareena Kapoor Khan)
    - Rishi Kapoor (actor - son of Krishna & Raj Kapoor)
      - Neetu Kapoor (actress - wife of Rishi Kapoor)
      - Ranbir Kapoor (actor - son of Neetu & Rishi Kapoor)
        - Alia Bhatt (actress - wife of Ranbir Kapoor)
    - Rajiv Kapoor (actor - son of Krishna & Raj Kapoor)
  - Nikhil Nanda (businessman - grandson of Krishna & Raj Kapoor)
    - Shweta Bachchan (columnist, author, and model - wife of Nikhil Nanda)
    - Agastya Nanda (actor - son of Nikhil Nanda & Shweta Bachchan-Nanda)
- Uma Malhotra (sister of Prem Nath)
  - Prem Chopra (actor - husband of Uma Malhotra)
  - Vikas Bhalla (actor - son-in-law of Prem & Uma Chopra)
  - Sharman Joshi (actor - son-in-law of Prem & Uma Chopra)

=== Malik family ===
- Sardar Malik was a music director in the 1900s.
  - Anu Malik (music composer – son of Sardaar Malik)
    - Anmol Malik (singer and songwriter – elder daughter of Anu Malik)
    - Adaa Malik (fashion designer – younger daughter of Anu Malik)
  - Abu Malik (music composer – second son of Sardaar Malik)
    - Aadar Mallik (singer and songwriter – son of Abu Malik)
  - Daboo Malik (music director – youngest son of Sardaar Malik)
    - Amaal Mallik (music composer – elder son of Daboo Malik)
    - Armaan Malik (singer – younger son of Daboo Malik)
- Hasrat Jaipuri (lyricist – brother-in-law of Sardaar Malik)

=== Mathur family ===
- Mukesh (singer)
  - Nitin Mukesh (singer – son of Mukesh)
    - Neil Nitin Mukesh (actor – son of Nitin Mukesh and grandson of Mukesh)
- Motilal (actor - distant relative of Mukesh)
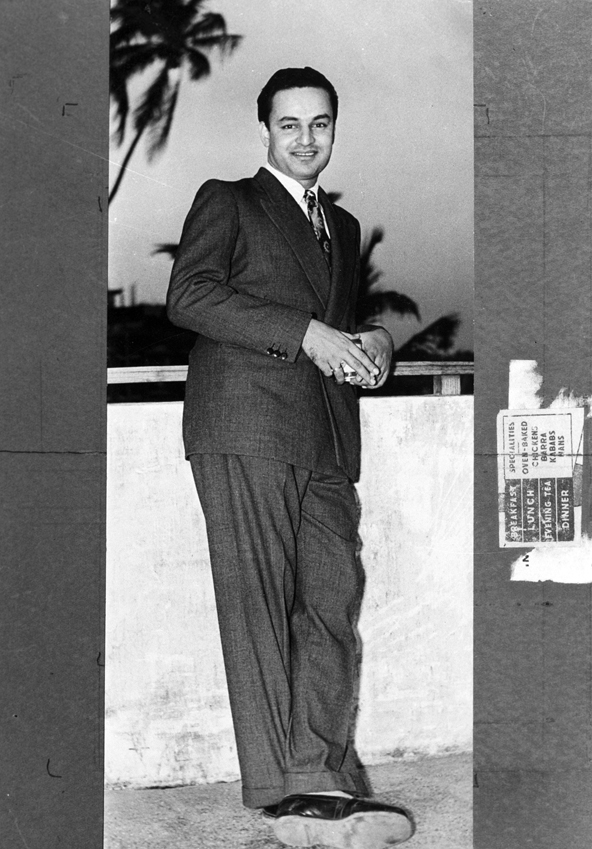
Mukesh

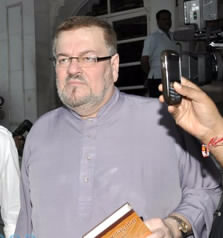
Nitin Mukesh

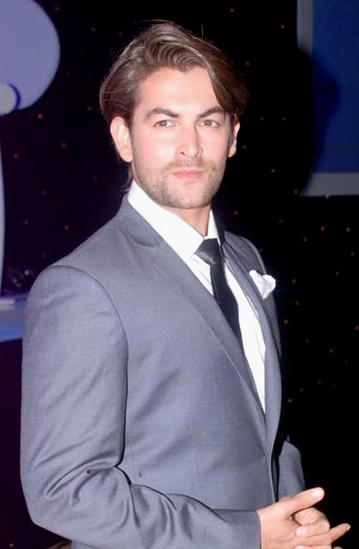
Neil Nitin Mukesh

=== Mammootty family ===
- Mammootty (three time National Award winning actor and film producer, who has acted in films in six languages including Malayalam, Tamil, Telugu, Kannada, Hindi and English. He predominantly works in Malayalam cinema)
  - Ibrahim Kutty (actor and politician) - brother of Mammootty
  - Dulquer Salmaan (actor and producer, who has acted in films in four languages including Malayalam, Tamil, Telugu and Hindi. He predominantly works in Malayalam cinema. He is the younger son of Mammootty)
  - Surumi aka Kutty Surumi (painter and humanitarian) - daughter of Mammootty
  - Maqbool Salmaan (actor) – nephew of Mammootty, son of Ibrahim Kutty)
  - Ashkar Saudan (actor – nephew of Mammootty)
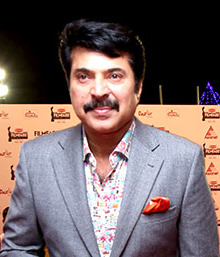
Mammootty

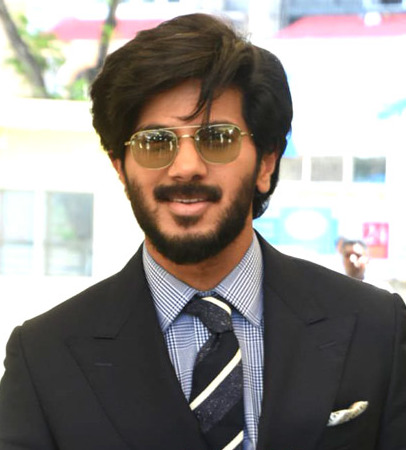
Dulquer Salmaan

=== Mangeshkar-Hardikar-Abhisheki-Kolhapure extended family ===
- Deenanath Mangeshkar (musician and theatre actor – son of Ganesh Bhatt Bhikoba (Bhikambhatt) Navathe Hardikar Abhisheki by his mistress Yesubai)
  - Lata Mangeshkar (singer – eldest daughter of Deenanath Mangeshkar)
  - Hridaynath Mangeshkar (music composer and singer – son of Deenanath Mangeshkar)
  - Meena Khadikar (singer – daughter of Deenanath Mangeshkar)
  - Usha Mangeshkar (singer – daughter of Deenanath Mangeshkar)
  - Asha Bhosle (singer – daughter of Deenanath Mangeshkar)
  - R. D. Burman (composer – second husband of Asha Bhosle and son of S. D. Burman, grandson of Nabadwipchandra Dev Burman, and great-grandson of Ishan Chandra Manikya)
    - Varsha Bhosle (daughter of Asha and Ganpatrao Bhosle)
- Balawantrao (Bhikambhatt) Abhisheki (half-brother of Deenanath Mangeshkar and son of Ganesh Bhatt Bhikoba (Bhikambhatt) Navathe Hardikar Abhisheki)
  - Jitendra Abhisheki (musician)
    - Shounak Abhisheki (vocalist, composer, son of Jitendra Abhisheki)
- Daughter of Ganesh Bhatt Bhikoba (Bhikambhatt) Navathe Hardikar Abhisheki + Pandit Krishnarao Kolhapure
  - Pt.Pandharinath Kolhapure (musician) married to Nirupama Kolhapure
    - Shivangi Kolhapure (oldest daughter of Pt.Pandharinath Kolhapure), married to Shakti Kapoor (actor)
      - Siddhanth Kapoor (actor – son of Shakti and Shivangi Kapoor)
      - Shraddha Kapoor (actress, singer – daughter of Shakti and Shivangi Kapoor)
    - Padmini Kolhapure (actress, singer and entrepreneur – middle daughter of Pt.Pandharinath Kolhapure), married Bollywood producer Pradeep Sharma (Tutu Sharma)
      - Priyaank Sharma ( actor, producer- son of Pradeep Sharma (Tutu Sharma) and Padmini Kolhapure )
      - Shaza Morani ( wife of Priyaank Sharma and Daughter of Producer Karim Morani )
    - Tejaswini Kolhapure (actress – youngest daughter of Pt.Pandharinath Kolhapure), married to Pankaj Saraswat
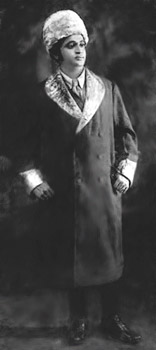
Deenanath Mangeshkar

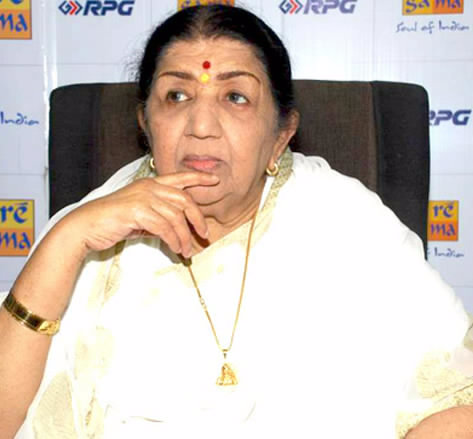
Lata Mangeshkar

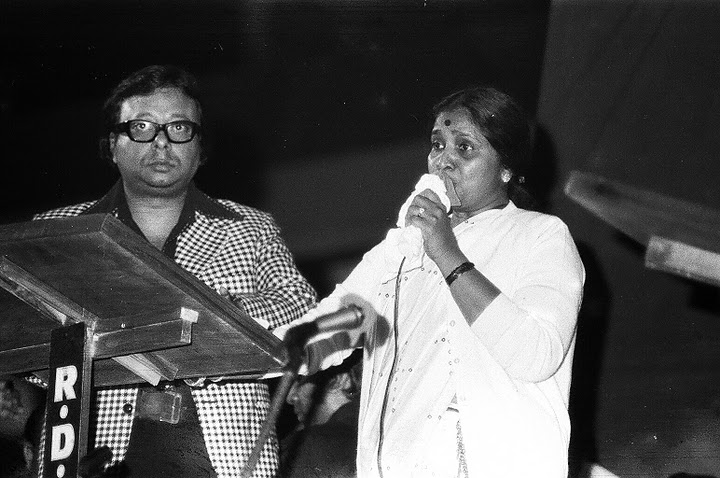
Asha Bhosle and R.D. Burman

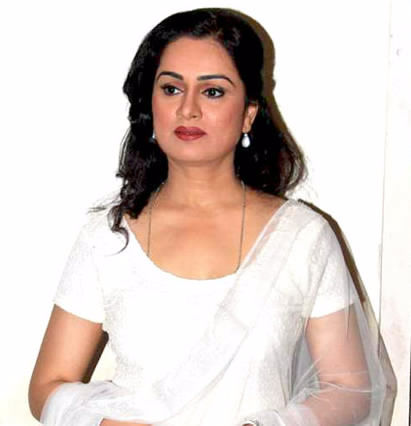
Padmini Kolhapure

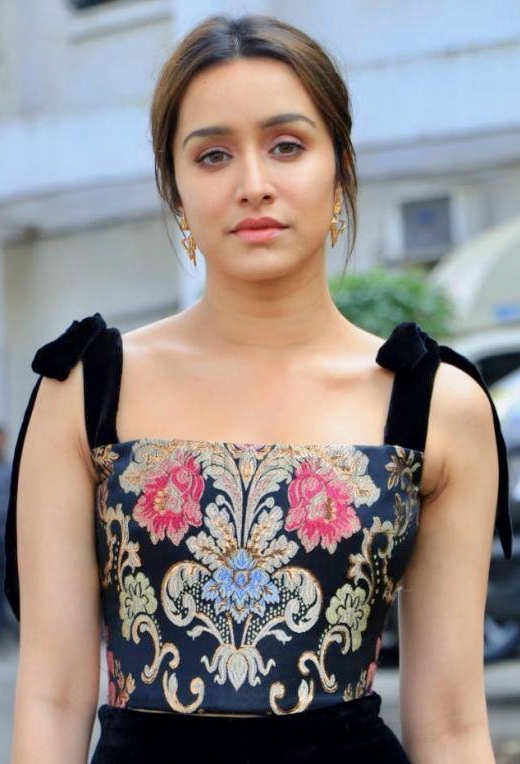
Shraddha Kapoor

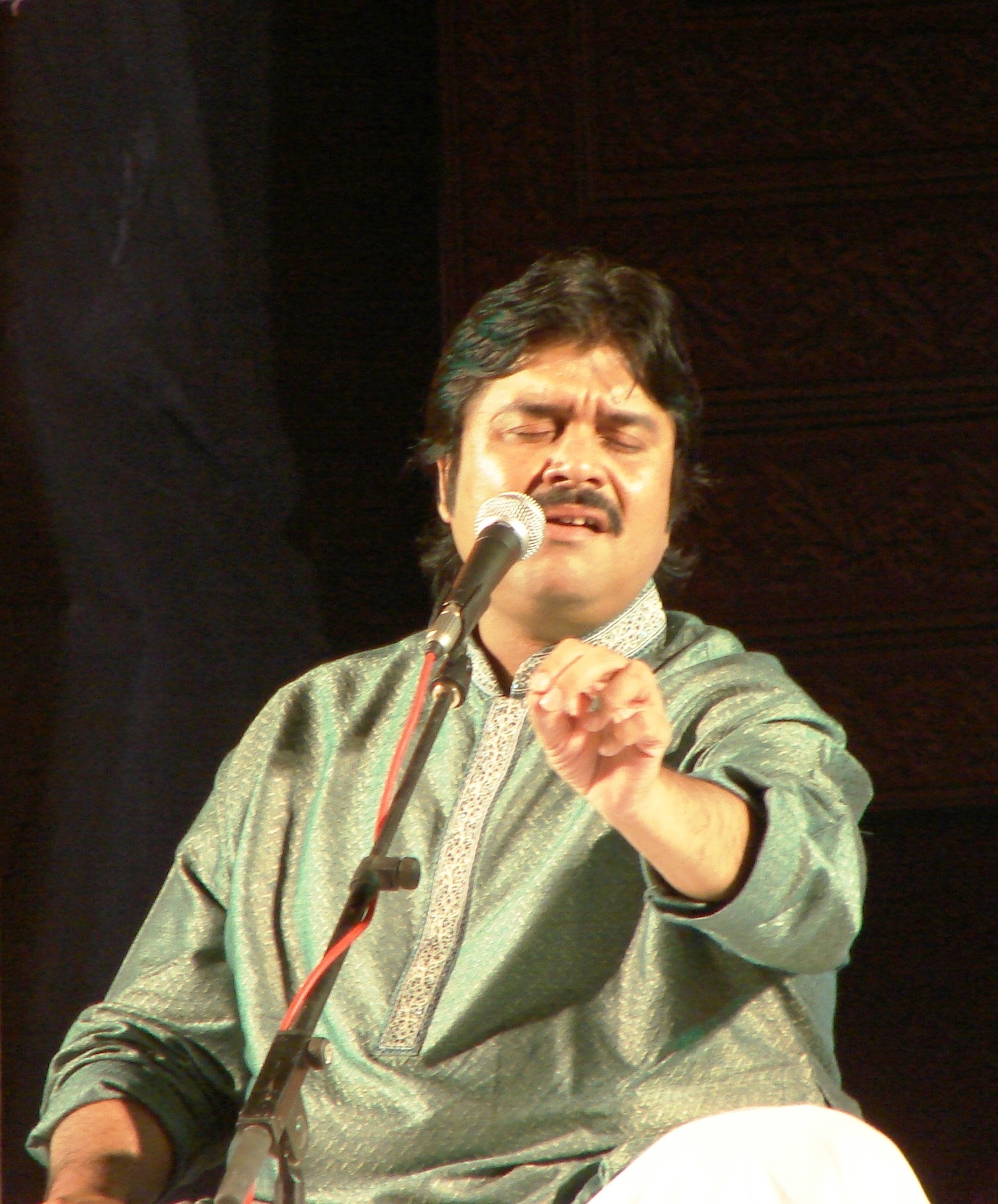
Shounak Abhisheki

=== Mohanlal family ===
- Mohanlal (Actor, Producer, Director, Playback Singer)
  - Pranav Mohanlal (actor, playback singer – son of Mohanlal)
  - Vismaya Mohanlal (actor, writer - daughter of mohanlal)
- K. Balaji (producer – father-in-law of Mohanlal)
- Suresh Balaje (executive producer – brother-in-law of Mohanlal)
- Y. G. Mahendran (actor, dramatist, brother-in-law of Mohanlal)

=== Mukherjee family ===
- Manas Mukherjee (music director – son of Jahar Mukherjee)
  - Shaan (singer, actor and TV presenter – son of Manas Mukherjee)
  - Sagarika (singer and actress – daughter of Manas Mukherjee)

=== Mukherjee–Samarth family ===
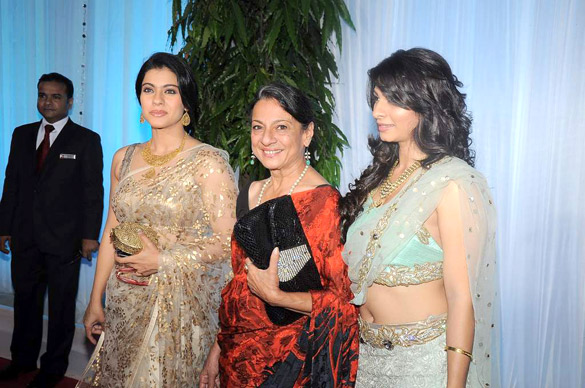
Kajol, Tanuja and Tanishaa at Esha Deol's wedding reception

The Mukherjee-Samarth family has been active in the film industry since the 1940s when Rattan Bai, mother of actor Shobhana Samarth, acted in various films. The current members of the Mukherjee-Samarth family working in the industry are actor Tanuja, actress Kajol (married to actor Ajay Devgn), actress Rani Mukerji (married to producer-director Aditya Chopra), actress Tanishaa, and actor Mohnish Bahl. Their family married the Ganguly brothers. The Mukherjees and Samarths came together by marriage between producer Sashadhar Mukherjee and Sati Devi's son Shomu Mukherjee and Shobhana Samarth and director Kumarsen Samarth's daughter Tanuja. Shomu's cousin married the sister of actor Debashree Roy.

Film personalities of Mukherjee-Samarth family
1st generation	2nd generation	3rd generation	4th generation	5th generation	Career	Born	Died	Relation
Rattan Bai					Actor, Singer	1890	1986	Mother of Shobhana Samarth
	Shobhna Samarth				Actor	1916	2000	Daughter of Rattan Bai, mother of Nutan and Tanuja
	Kumarsen Samarth				Director			Former husband of Sobhana Samarth
		Nutan			Actor	1936	1991	Daughter of Shobhana and Kumarsen Samarth, sister of Tanuja
			Mohnish Bahl		Actor	1961		Son of Nutan and Rajnish Behl
				Pranutan Bahl	Actor	1993		Son of Ekta Sohini and Mohnish Behl
		Tanuja			Actor	1943		Daughter of Shobhana Samarth and Kumarsen Samarth, married to Shomu Mukherjee
	Nalini Jaywant				Actor	1926	2010	First cousin of Shobhana Samarth
	Sashadhar Mukherjee				Producer	1909	1990	Father of Deb, Joy and Shomu Mukherjee; husband of Sati Devi from Ganguly family
		Joy Mukherjee			Actor	1939	2012	Son of Sashadhar Mukherjee
		Deb Mukherjee			Actor	1941	2025	Son of Sashadhar Mukherjee
			Ayan Mukerji		Director	1983		Son of Deb Mukherjee
		Shomu Mukherjee			Director, writer, producer	1943	2008	Son of Sashadhar Mukherjee, husband of Tanuja
			Kajol		Actor	1974		Daughter of Tanuja and Shomu Mukherjee, married to Ajay Devgan from Devgan family
			Tanishaa		Actor	1978		Daughter of Tanuja and Shomu Mukherjee
	Subodh Mukherjee				Director, producer	1921	2005	Brother of Sashadhar Mukherjee
		Shyam Mukherjee			Film editor			Son of Sashadhar's brother Ravidramohan Mukherjee
		Ram Mukherjee			Writer, director, producer	1933	2017	Son of Ravidramohan Mukherjee, married to singer Krishna Roy
			Rani Mukerji		Actor	1978		Daughter of Ram Mukherjee and Krishna Roy, married to producer, director Aditya Chopra from Chopra family
		Debashree Roy			Actor	1961		Sister of Krishna Roy, formerly married to actor Prosenjit Chatterjee
			Sharbani Mukherjee		Actor	1969		Daughter of Shomu and Dev's brother Rono Mukherji

=== Murad–Rai-Aman family ===
- Murad (actor)
  - Raza Murad (actor, son of Murad)
  - Sabiha Murad
    - Sanober Kabir (actress and niece of Raza Murad and Daughter of Sabiha)
    - Faruk Kabir (director, producer and son of Sabiha) + Rukhsar Rehman (actress and ex-wife of Asad Ahmed)
    - Sonam (actress, niece of Raza Murad and ex-wife of Rajiv Rai, Daughter of Talat) + Rajiv Rai (director, writer, son of Gulshan Rai)
    - Rajiv Rai - Director and Husband of Sonam, Son of Gulshan Rai
- Amanullah Khan a.k.a. Amanullah Aman (script writer and brother-in-law of Murad)
  - Zeenat Aman (actress, daughter of Amanullah Khan)
  - Mazhar Khan (actor, husband of Zeenat Aman)

=== Desai family (Of Manmohan Desai) ===
- Kikubhai Desai (Father of Manmohan Desai -Producer 1931 -1941- Paramount Studios)
- Kalavati Desai (Mother of Manmohan Desai )
  - Subhash Desai (Elder Brother of Manmohan Desai)
  - Manmohan Desai (Producer and Director)
  - Jeevanprabha Desai (Wife of Manmohan Desai )
    - Ketan Desai (Son of Manmohan Desai -Director )
    - Kanchan Desai (Wife of Ketan Desai and Daughter Shammi Kapoor-Actor,Geeta Bali- Actress)

== N ==
=== Nandamuri family ===
- N. T. Rama Rao (28 May 1923 – 18 January 1996), popularly known as NTR, was a Telugu cinema actor, filmmaker and politician who served as Chief Minister of Andhra Pradesh over three terms.
- Basavatarakam-1st wife of NTR
  - Nandamuri Harikrishna (actor, politician)-Son of NTR
    - N. T. Rama Rao Jr. (grandson of NTR, S/O Nandamuri Harikrishna)
    - Nandamuri Kalyan Ram (grandson of NTR, S/O Nandamuri Harikrishna)
  - Nandamuri Balakrishna (actor, politician)-Son of NTR
  - Daggubati Purandeswari (politician)-D/O NTR
  - N. Chandrababu Naidu (Chief Minister of Andhra Pradesh)-H/O Bhuvaneshwari
    - Nara Lokesh (politician, Cabinet Minister of Andhra Pradesh) (grandson of SR NTR, S/O N. Chandrababu Naidu)
- Taraka Ratna (grandson of SR NTR, S/O Nandamuri Mohankrishna)
- Lakshmi Parvathi (author, politician)-2nd W/O NTR
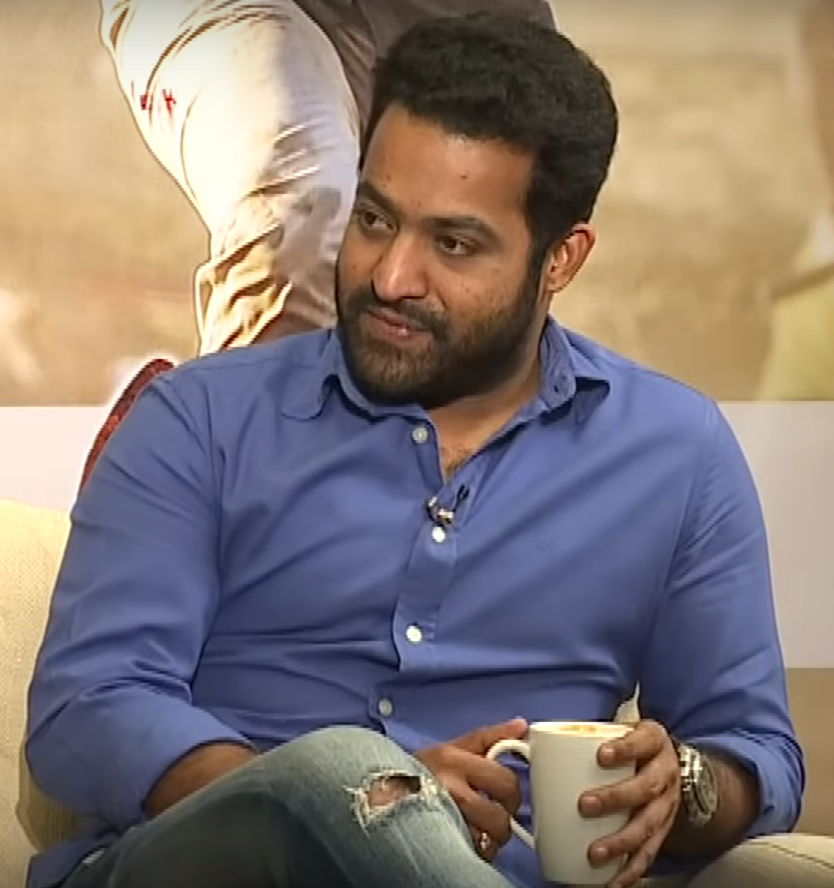
N. T. Rama Rao Jr., aka Jr. NTR

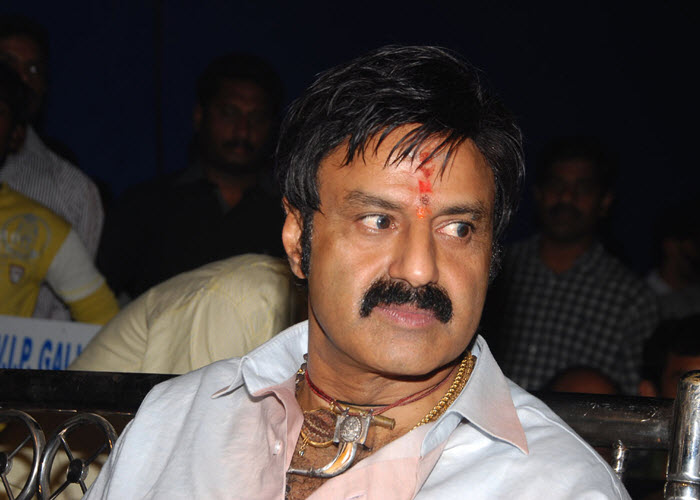
Nandamuri Balakrishna, aka NBK

=== Narayan Jha family ===
- Udit Narayan Jha (singer)
  - Aditya Narayan Jha (singer and TV presenter – son of Udit Narayan)
  - Shweta Agarwal Jha (Actress and W/O Aditya Narayan)

== O ==
=== Oberoi family ===
- Suresh Oberoi (actor)
  - Vivek Oberoi (actor – son of Suresh and Yashodhara Oberoi)
  - Akshay Oberoi (actor – nephew of Suresh Oberoi)
  - Neha Uberoi (tennis player - niece of Suresh)
  - Shikha Uberoi (tennis player - niece of Suresh)
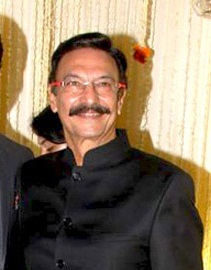
Suresh Oberoi

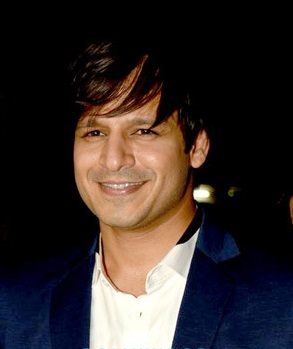
Vivek Oberoi

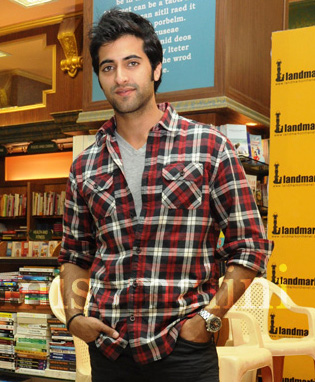
Akshay Oberoi

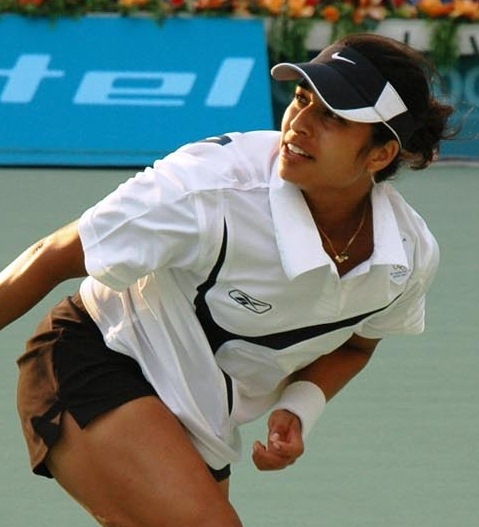
Shikha Uberoi

== P ==
=== Pal family ===
- Bipin Chandra Pal (Indian nationalist, associated with the trio "Lal, Bal and Pal".)
  - Niranjan Pal (playwright, screenwriter and director – son of Bipin Chandra Pal)
    - Colin Pal (actor, technician, journalist and publicist – son of Niranjan Pal)
      - Deep Pal (cinematographer – son of Colin Pal)

=== Pandit family ===
- Pandit Maniram (guru and elder brother of Pandit Jasraj)
  - Pandit Dinesh – Musician
- Jasraj (Indian classical vocalist)
  - Durga Jasraj (television presenter, daughter of Pandit Jasraj)
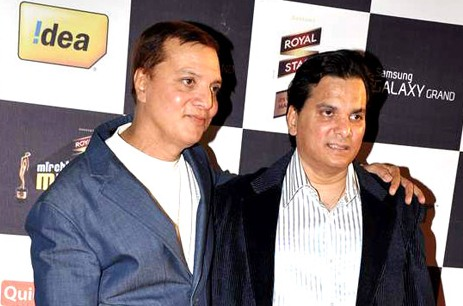
    Brothers Jatin–Lalit.
  - Jatin Pandit (composer, son of Pandit Pratap Narayan)
  - Lalit Pandit (composer, son of Pandit Pratap Narayan)
  - Sulakshana Pandit (playback singer and actress – daughter of Pandit Pratap Narayan)
  - Vijayta Pandit (actress and playback singer – daughter of Pandit Pratap Narayan)
    - Aadesh Shrivastava composer, husband of Vijayata Pandit
    - Shweta Pandit (singer, daughter of Sulakshana and Vijayta Pandit's brother tabla player Vishwaraj Pandit)
    - Shraddha Pandit (singer, daughter of Vishwaraj Pandit)
    - Yash Pandit (actor, son of Vishwaraj Pandit)
  - Hemlata (singer – cousin of Sulakshana Pandit)
  - Jagdish Prasad (Indian classical vocalist – cousin of Sulakshana Pandit)
    - Samrat Pandit (Indian Classical vocalist – son of Jagdish Prasad)
    - Santhosh Pandit (Indian Film actor/producer/director/scriptwriter/lyricist/composer/choreographer/singer/editor/philanthropist – son of Wawwal Pandit)

=== Pataudi-Tagore family ===
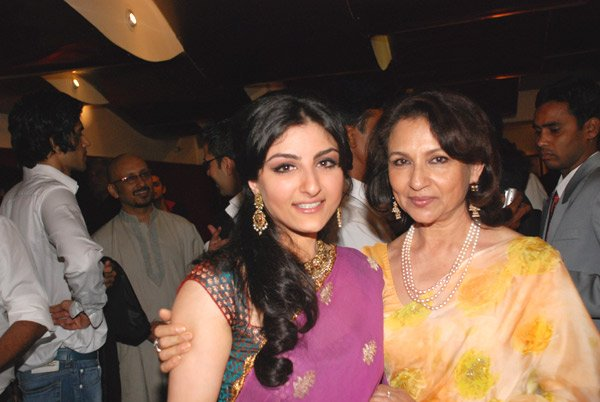
Soha Ali Khan and Sharmila Tagore

Actress Sharmila Tagore married Mansoor Ali Khan Pataudi, a cricket player in the 1960s and 70s and the 9th and last Nawab of Pataudi. Two of their children, Saif Ali Khan and Soha Ali Khan, and a granddaughter, Sara Ali Khan, are film actors. Both Saif and Soha have also married film actors.

Film personalities of Pataudi Family
1st generation	2nd generation	3rd generation	4th generation	Career	Born	Died	Relation
Mansoor Ali Khan Pataudi				Cricketer	1941	2011	
Ayesha Sultana (née Sharmila Tagore)				Actress	1944		Wife of Mansoor Ali Khan Pataudi, 9th Nawab of Pataudi (see Tagore family)
	Saif Ali Khan			Actor	1970		Son of Mansoor Ali Khan Pataudi and Sharmila Tagore
	Amrita Singh			Actress	1958		First (and ex-) wife of Saif Ali Khan, and daughter of Shivinder Singh Virk and Rukhsana Sultana (see Dilip Kumar's relatives)
		Sara Ali Khan		Actress	1995		Daughter of Saif Ali Khan and Amrita Singh
		Ibrahim Ali Khan		Actor	2001		Son of Saif Ali Khan and Amrita Singh
	Kareena Kapoor			Actress	1980		Second wife of Saif Ali Khan and daughter of Randhir Kapoor and Babita (see Kapoor family), Sister – in law of Soha and Saba.
		Taimur Ali Khan					Son of Saif Ali Khan and Kareena Kapoor Khan
		Jehangir Ali Khan					Son of Saif Ali Khan and Kareena Kapoor Khan
	Saba Ali Khan						Daughter of Mansoor Ali Khan Pataudi and Sharmila Tagore
	Soha Ali Khan			Actress	1978		Daughter of Mansoor Ali Khan Pataudi and Sharmila Tagore
	Kunal Khemu			Actor	1983		Husband of Soha Ali Khan and grandson of Moti Lal Kemmu

=== Patel family ===
- Ameesha Patel (actress – daughter of Asha Patel and Amit Patel).
- Ashmit Patel (actor and reality show star – son of Asha Patel and Amit Patel)

=== Panday family ===
- Sharad Panday (renowned heart surgeon)
- Snehlata Panday (Snehlata Kapoor)
  - Chunky Panday (actor - son of Sharad Panday)
    - Bhavna Panday (television personality, entrepreneur, and costume designer - wife of Chunky Panday)
    - Ananya Panday (actress - daughter of Chunky Panday)
    - Rysa Panday (internet personality - daughter of Chunky Panday)
  - Chikki Panday (businessman - brother of Chunky Panday)
    - Deanne Panday (author - wife of Chikki Panday)
    - Ahaan Panday (actor - son of Chikki Panday)
    - Alanna Panday (YouTuber and social media personality - daughter of Chikki Panday)
- Raj Kumar Kapoor (actor, producer, director, and Indian military veteran - uncle of Chunky Panday)
- Satya Pal Wahi ( Grand uncle of Chunky Panday, an Indian military veteran former chairman of public sector enterprises Oil and Natural Gas Corporation (ONGC)
- Rakesh Wahi (Indian military veteran, author and entrepreneur uncle of Chunky Panday)

=== Puri family ===
Madan Puri was probably the best known villain in the film industry in the 1950s and late 1960s. His brothers Chaman Puri and Amrish Puri were also very successful actors of their time.

- Lala Nihaal Chand Puri (businessman, father of Chaman, Madan and Amrish)
  - Chaman Puri (actor, elder brother of Madan Puri and Amrish Puri)
  - Madan Puri (actor, second brother of Chaman Puri and Amrish Puri)
  - Amrish Puri (actor, youngest brother of Chaman Puri and Madan Puri)
    - Rajiv Puri (businessman, son of Amrish, father of Vardhaan)
      - Vardhan Puri (actor, grandson Of Amrish Puri)
- Kesarbai Saigal (née Puri) (sister of Lala Nihal Chand Puri, aunt of Madan, Chaman and Amrish)
  - K. L. Saigal (singer, son of Kesarbai, first cousin of Madan, Chaman and Amrish Puri)

=== Pilgaonkar ===
- Sachin Pilgaonkar (actor, director, producer)
- Supriya Pilgaonkar (actor, wife of Sachin Pilgaokar)
  - Shriya Pilgaonkar (actor, daughter of Sachin and Supriya Pilgaokar)

== R ==
=== Rajinikanth family ===
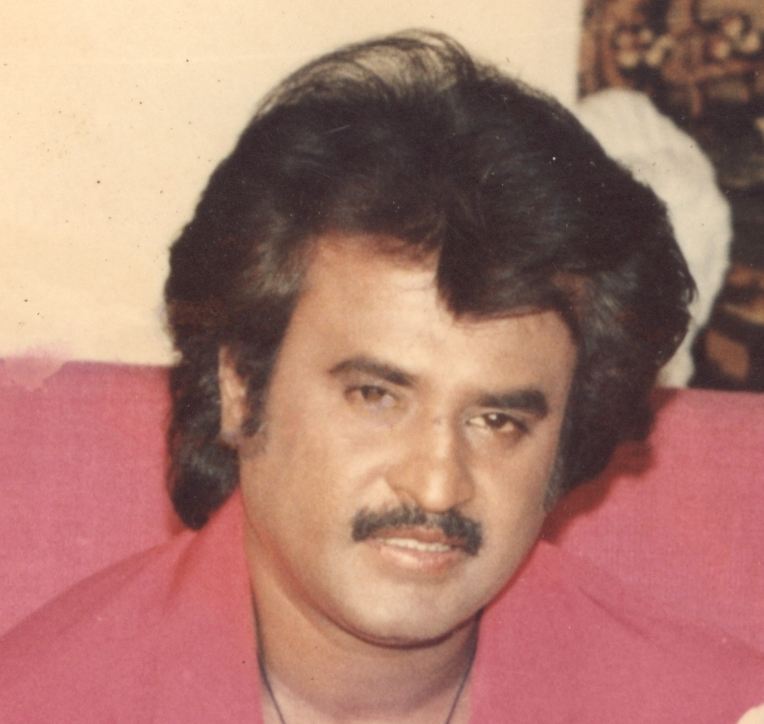
Rajinikanth

- Rajinikanth (actor, producer and screenwriter)
- Latha Rajinikanth (film producer and playback singer – wife of Rajinikanth)
  - Aishwarya Rajinikanth (film producer – daughter of Rajinikanth)
    - Dhanush (actor) - ex-husband of Aishwarya, son of (see Kasthuri Raja family)
  - Soundarya Rajinikanth (graphic designer, film producer and director – daughter of Rajinikanth)
- Ravi Raghavendra (actor – father of Anirudh, brother-in-law of Rajinikanth)
  - Anirudh Ravichander (music director and playback singer – nephew of Rajinikanth)
- Y. G. Mahendran (actor, dramatist, brother-in-law of Latha Rajinikanth)
  - Y. G. Madhuvanthi (actress, daughter of Y. G. Mahendra)
  - Vyjayanthimala (actress, cousin of Y. G. Mahendra)
- K. Balaji (producer, Y. G. Mahendra's uncle)
  - Suresh Balaje (producer, son of K. Balaji)
  - Suchitra Mohanlal (daughter of K. Balaji, wife of Mohanlal)
  - Mohanlal (actor, husband of Suchitra, father of Pranav, son-in-law of K. Balaji)
    - Pranav Mohanlal (actor, son of Mohanlal and Suchitra)

=== Rajkumar family ===
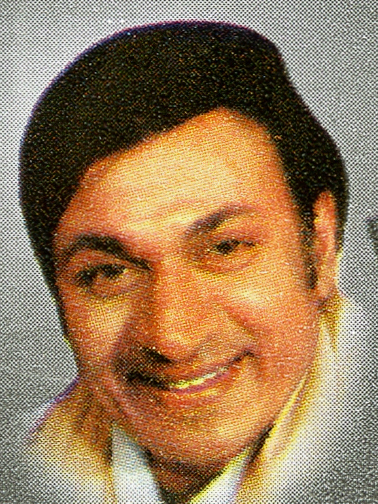
Dr. Rajkumar

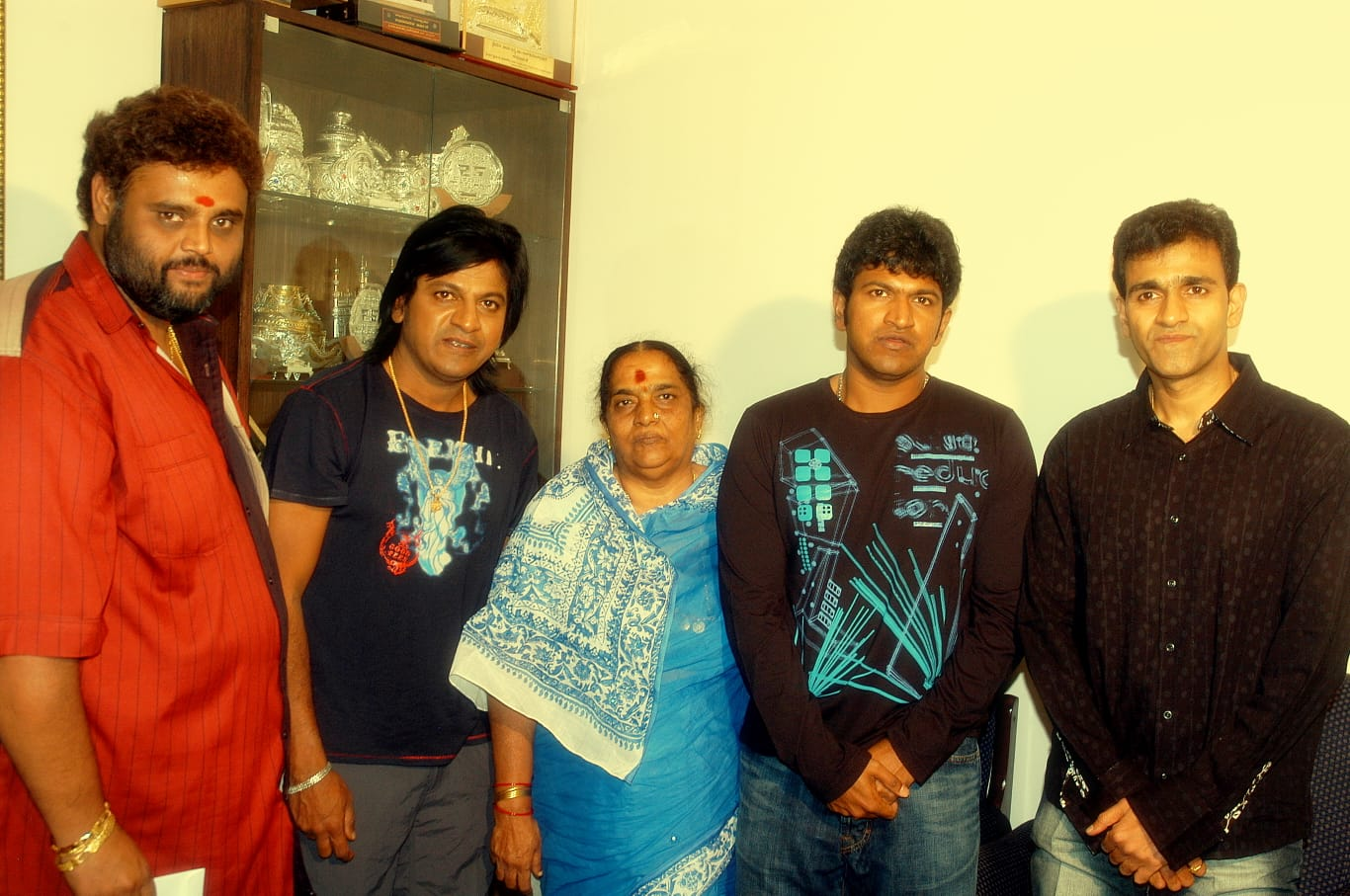
(from left) Ravi Srivatsa, Shiva Rajkumar, Parvathamma Rajkumar, Puneeth Rajkumar, Raghavendra Rajkumar

- Dr. Rajkumar (actor and singer)
- Parvathamma Rajkumar (producer – wife of Rajkumar)
  - Shiva Rajkumar (actor – son of Rajkumar)
  - Sarekoppa Bangarappa (politician) - father-in-law of Shiva Rajkumar
    - Kumar Bangarappa (actor and politician) - brother-in-law of Shiva Rajkumar
    - Madhu Bangarappa (politician) - brother-in-law of Shiva Rajkumar
  - Raghavendra Rajkumar (actor and producer – son of Rajkumar)
    - Vinay Rajkumar (actor – son of Raghavendra Rajkumar)
    - Yuva Rajkumar (actor – son of Raghavendra Rajkumar)
  - Puneeth Rajkumar (actor, Producer, Television show Host and playback singer – son of Rajkumar)
  - Ramkumar (actor – son-in-law of Rajkumar)
- S. A. Chinne Gowda (producer – brother of Parvathamma Rajkumar)
  - Vijay Raghavendra (actor – son of S. A. Chinne Gowda)
  - Sriimurali (actor – son of S. A. Chinne Gowda)
    - Prashanth Neel (director- brother-in-law of Sriimurali)
  - Balaraj

=== Ramsay family ===
The Ramsays were seven brothers who had achieved cult status for producing low-budget horror films through the 1970s and 1980s, going into the early 1990s. They were the sons of Fatehchand Uttamchand (FU) Ramsay, who had shifted to Mumbai (then Bombay) from Karachi after Partition with his wife and children. In Karachi, the Ramsays (originally Ramsinghani) ran a radio store, and set in Mumbai before shifting to movies. FU Ramsay tried his hand first, but was a failure. But the brothers hit upon the idea of making horror films, starting with Do Gaz Zameen Ke Neeche in 1972. They chose low-cost options, with family members handling most of the key bits of the film-making process. They chose actors who didn't cost too much and shot at actual locations instead of spending on sets. Some of their best known films are Darwaza, Dahshat, Purana Mandir and Veerana. Though they stopped making films together afterwards, most of them continued to be a part of the movies, especially Keshu Ramsay, who produced a number of successful films with Akshay Kumar and made the brilliant Khakee in 2004. The brothers – apart from Keshu – did, however, come together to produce the extremely successful Zee Horror Show, which later became Anhonee, for television.

- Tulsi Ramsay (producer and director, son of F. U. Ramsay)
- Keshu Ramsay (cinematographer and producer, son of F. U. Ramsay)
  - Aryeman (actor, producer and director, son of Keshu Ramsay)
- Shyam Ramsay (director and producer, son of F. U. Ramsay)
- Kiran Ramsay (sound recordist and producer, son of F. U. Ramsay)

=== Randhawa family ===
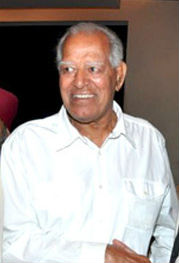
Dara Singh

- Dara Singh (Wrestler and Actor)
  - Vindu Dara Singh (actor, son of Dara Singh)
  - Farah Naaz (actress,ex-wife)
  - Fateh Randhawa (son from first wife)
  - Dina Umarova (CEO at Beso Enterprises Pvt. Ltd Founder Bluesky Nail Academy Bluesky, Brand Ambassador at Asia Pacific,current wife of Vindu)
  - Amelia Randhawa (daughter)
- Randhawa (wrestler and actor, brother of Dara Singh)
- Malika Askari (wife of Randhawa)
  - Shaad Randhawa (actor, son of Randhawa)
- Mumtaz (actress, related to Khan family, sister of Malika)

=== Roy Kapur family ===
- Siddharth Roy Kapur (film producer, brother of Aditya and Kunaal)
- Vidya Balan (actress, wife of Siddharth Roy Kapur)
- Aditya Roy Kapur (actor, brother of Siddharth and Kunaal)
- Kunaal Roy Kapur (actor, brother of Siddharth and Aditya)

=== Ray–Ganguly–Bose family ===
- Dwarkanath Ganguly (Social reformer, father-in-law of Upendrakishore Ray)
- Kadambini Ganguly (one of the two first female graduates & one of the two first female physicians in India, second wife of Dwarkanath Ganguly)
  - Upendrakishore Ray Chowdhury (writer, painter, violinist, composer, technologist and entrepreneur)
  - Hemendra Mohan Bose (entrepreneur, brother-in-law of Upendrakishore Ray)
    - Sukumar Ray (poet, story writer and playwright – son of Upendrakishore Ray)
    - Shukhalata Rao (author, daughter of Upendrakishore Ray)
    - Leela Majumdar (author, daughter of Surama Devi and Pramada Ranjan Ray, the younger brother of Upendrakishore Ray)
    - Nitin Bose (film director, son of Hemendra Bose)
    - Kartick Bose, Ganesh Bose, Bapi Bose (Bengal cricketers, brothers of Nitin Bose)
    - Malati Ghoshal (singer, daughter of Hemendra Bose)
      - Satyajit Ray (film director, producer, screenwriter, writer, music director and lyricist – son of Sukumar Ray)
      - Bijoya Ray (actor and playback singer – wife of Satyajit Ray)
        - Sandip Ray (director – son of Satyajit Ray and Bijoya Ray)

The family is related to Ganguly family through the marriage of Ruma Guha Thakurta, niece of Bijoya Ray to Kishore Kumar.

=== Roshan family ===
Rakesh Roshan is an actor from the 1960s to the 1980s. Towards the 1990s he started directing films. His brother Rajesh is a music director and does the music for Rakesh's films. Rakesh introduced his son Hrithik Roshan Nagrath in 2000 in the film Kaho Naa... Pyaar Hai which made Hrithik a star overnight.

This family is joined to that of producer and director J. Om Prakash, through his daughter Pinky Roshan Nagrath, who is the wife of Rakesh and the mother of Hrithik. It also connected to the family of Feroz Khan through designer Sussanne Khan, who is the ex-wife of Hrithik and the mother of their sons Hrehaan and Hridhaan. Pashmina Roshan (daughter of Rajesh Roshan and his wife Kanchan Roshan) also joined film industry as an actress with debut movie Ishq Vishk Rebound.

- Roshan
- Ira Roshan (wife of Roshan Nagrath)
  - Rakesh Roshan Nagrath (first son of Roshan and Ira)
    - Hrithik Roshan Nagrath (son of Rakesh)
  - Rajesh Roshan (second son of Roshan and Ira)
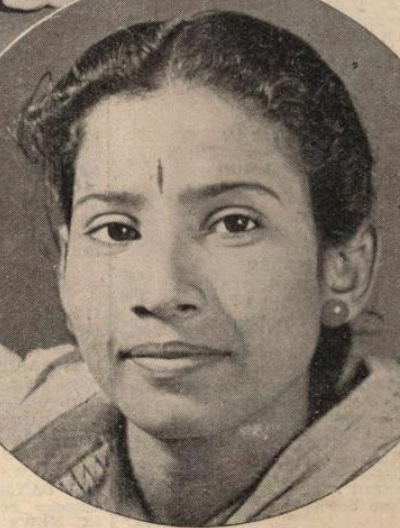
Ira Roshan

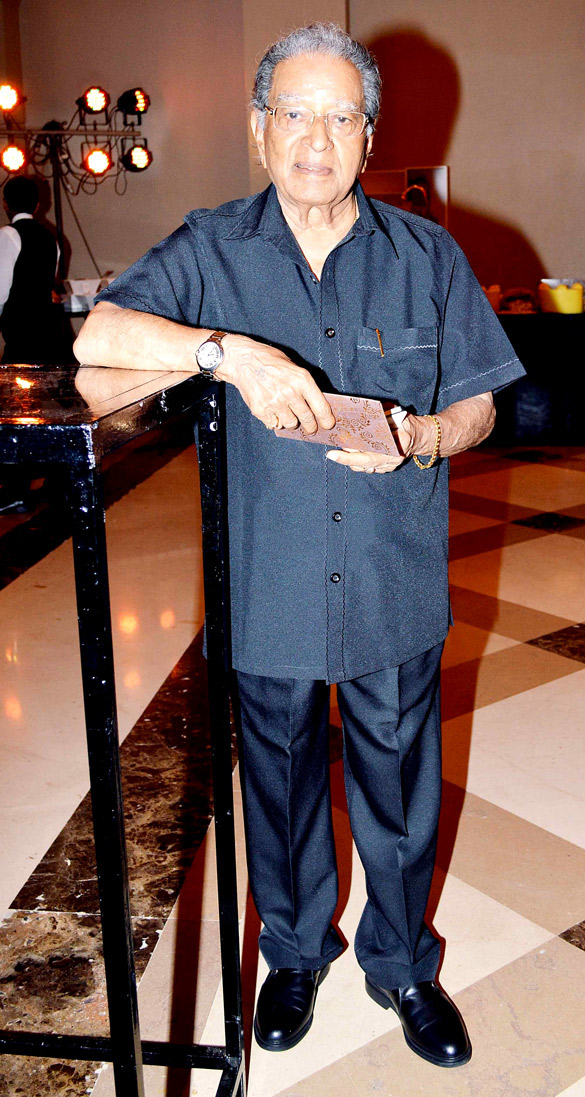
J. Om Prakash

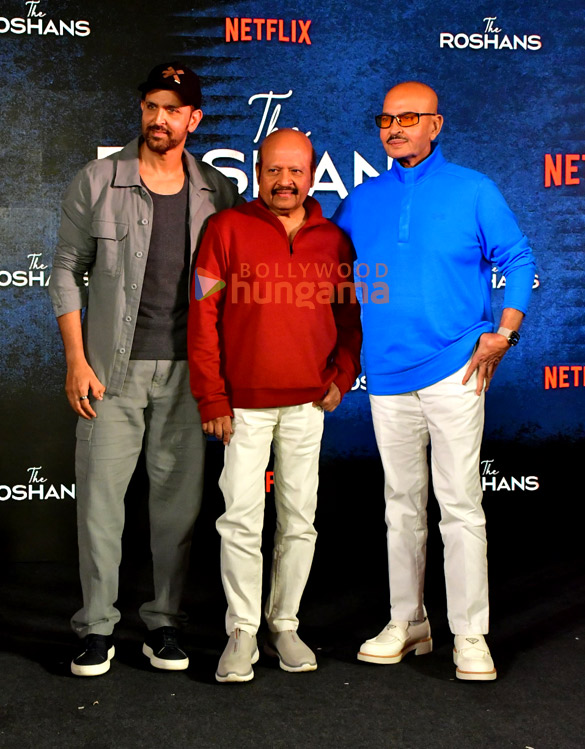
Hrithik Roshan (left) with uncle Rajesh Roshan (middle) and father Rakesh Roshan (right) in 2025

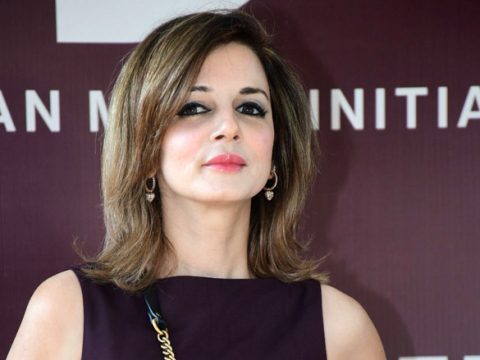
Sussanne Khan

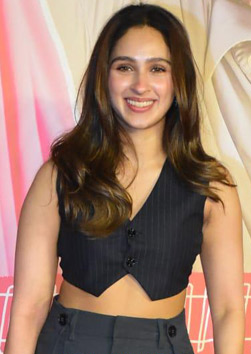
Pashmina Roshan

=== Roy–Bhattacharya family ===
- Bimal Roy (director)
  - Rinki Bhattacharya (writer, columnist and documentary filmmaker – daughter of Bimal Roy)
  - Basu Bhattacharya (director – son-in-law of Bimal Roy)
    - Aditya Bhattacharya (actor, director, screenwriter and producer – son of Basu Bhattacharya)
    - Sanjana Kapoor (theatre personality and actress – ex-wife of Aditya Bhattacharya)

=== Roy–Joshi–Irani–Desai family ===
- Pravin Joshi (theater artist and director)
- Sarita Joshi (stage, television, film actress, wife of Pravin Joshi)
  - Ketki Dave (actress, daughter of Sarita Joshi)
  - Purbi Joshi (TV and voice-dubbing actress – daughter of Sarita Joshi)
- Arvind Joshi (theatre artist, writer and brother of Pravin Joshi)
  - Sharman Joshi (actor – son of Arvind Joshi and son-in-law of Prem Chopra)
  - Manasi Joshi Roy (theater artist, daughter of Arvind joshi)
  - Rohit Roy (actor, husband of Mansi Joshi Roy)
  - Ronit Roy (actor, brother of Rohit Roy)
- Gulki Joshi (actress, niece of Praveen, Sarita, and Arvind Joshi)
- Poonam Joshi (actress, niece of Praveen, Sarita, and Arvind Joshi)
- Padmarani (sister of Sarita Joshi, Gujrathi and Hindi film actress)
- Namdar Irani - director and husband of Padmarani
  - Daisy Irani (actress – daughter of Padmarani)
  - Faredoon Irani - Director and father of Aruna Irani
  - Aruna Irani (paternal niece to Padmarani's husband, film and television actress)
  - Kuku Kohli (husband of Aruna Irani, director and writer)
  - Adi Irani (brother of Aruna Irani)
  - Indra Kumar (brother of Aruna Irani)
  - Firoz Irani (brother of Aruna Irani)
  - Bindu (actress - cousin of Aruna Irani)
  - Nanubhai Desai (writer and director - father of Bindu)

=== Ratheesh family ===
- Ratheesh
- Parvathy Ratheesh (actress, daughter of Ratheesh)
- Padmaraj Ratheesh (actor, son of Ratheesh)

=== Rajda family ===
- Mulraj Rajda (writer, director and actor)
- Indumati Rajda (actress, wife of Mulraj Rajda)
  - Sameer Rajda (actor, son of Mulraj and Indumati Rajda)

== S ==
=== Sadanah Family ===
- Brij Sadanah - Producer
- Sayeeda Khan - Actress (wife of Sadanah)
  - Kamal Sadanah - actor and film producer (son of Brij and Sayeeda)
- Chander Sadanah - Producer and brother of Brij
- Shama Kazi / Seema Sadanah - Wife of Chander
  - Nagma - Actress and daughter of Seema and Arvind Morarji
  - Jyothika - Actress and daughter of Seema and Chander, half-sister of Nagma, married to Suriya - actor and member of the Sivakumar family
  - Roshini - Actress and daughter of Seema and Chander, Half-sister of Nagma
- Shagufta Rafique - director and adopted sister of Sayeeda Khan

=== Sahu Family ===
- Kishore Sahu - Actor, Director
  - Vimal Sahu also Vikram Sahu - Actor
    - Pavan Sahu - Actor
  - Naina Sahu - Actor
  - Rohit Sahu
  - Mamta Sahu
    - Daniel Landerman
    - Soloman Landerman

=== Samanta family ===
- Shakti Samanta (director and producer)
  - Ashim Samanta (director, producer, son of Shakti Samanta)

=== Sapru family ===
- D. K. Sapru (character actor)
  - Tej Sapru (actor, son of Sapru)
  - Priti Sapru (actress, daughter of Sapru)
  - Reema Rakesh Nath (script writer, director, daughter of Sapru)
    - Karan Nath (actor, son of Reema and Rakesh Nath)

=== Sen family ===
- Suchitra Sen
  - Moon Moon Sen (daughter of Suchitra)
    - Raima Sen a.k.a. Raima Dev Varma (elder daughter of Moonmoon)
    - Riya Sen a.k.a. Riya Dev Varma (younger daughter of Moonmoon)

=== Sen family (of Chidananda Dasgupta) ===
- Chidananda Dasgupta (director)
  - Aparna Sen (actor and director – daughter of Chidananda Dasgupta)
  - Mukul Sharma (sports journalist – ex-husband of Aparna Sen)
    - Konkona Sen Sharma (actress – daughter of Aparna)
    - Ranvir Shorey (actor – ex-husband of Konkana)

=== Shivdasani family ===
- Hari Shivdasani (actor)
  - Babita (actress daughter of Hari Shivdasani), married to Randhir Kapoor - see Kapoor family
    - Karisma Kapoor (actress), married to Sunjay Kapur
    - Kareena Kapoor (actress), married to Saif Ali Khan - see Pataudi family
- Shivram Shivdasani (Brother of Hari Shivdasani)
  - Sadhana Shivdasani (actress), married to R. K. Nayyar

=== Shetty family (of Suniel Shetty) ===
- Suniel Shetty (actor, producer and entrepreneur)
- Mana Shetty (entrepreneur and fashion designer – wife of Suniel Shetty)
  - Athiya Shetty (actress – daughter of Suniel Shetty)
  - KL Rahul (cricketer - husband of Athiya Shetty)
  - Ahan Shetty (actor– son of Suniel Shetty)

=== Shetty family (of Shilpa Shetty) ===
- Shilpa Shetty (actress, producer, model and businesswoman)
- Raj Kundra (husband of Shilpa Shetty, businessman, producer)
- Shamita Shetty (actress – sister of Shilpa Shetty)
- Shweta Shetty (singer – cousin of Shilpa Shetty and Shamita Shetty)

=== Shetty family (of MB Shetty) ===
M. B. Shetty worked as an action director and actor in Hindi and Kannada cinema. He had a towering personality with a bald head, often cast as the villain brought down by heroes half his size. Some of his memorable films include China Town, An Evening in Paris, Kismat, Lalkar, Aankhen, Don and Kalicharan. His two sons Rohit Shetty and Hriday Shetty are well-known film directors. Rohit has directed films like Golmaal series, Singham series and Chennai Express. Whereas Hriday directed Plan and Pyaar Ka Twist.

- M. B. Shetty (action director and actor)
  - Rohit Shetty (son of M.B.Shetty, director, producer and cinematographer)
  - Hriday Shetty (son of M.B.Shetty, director)

=== Shroff family ===
- Jackie Shroff (actor, film producer)
- Ayesha Dutt (former actress and model, current film producer)
  - Tiger Shroff (actor – son of Jackie Shroff)
  - Krishna Shroff (daughter of Jackie Shroff)
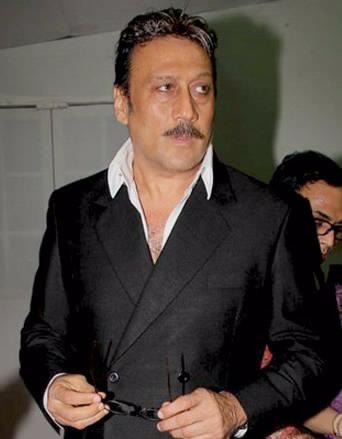
Jackie Shroff

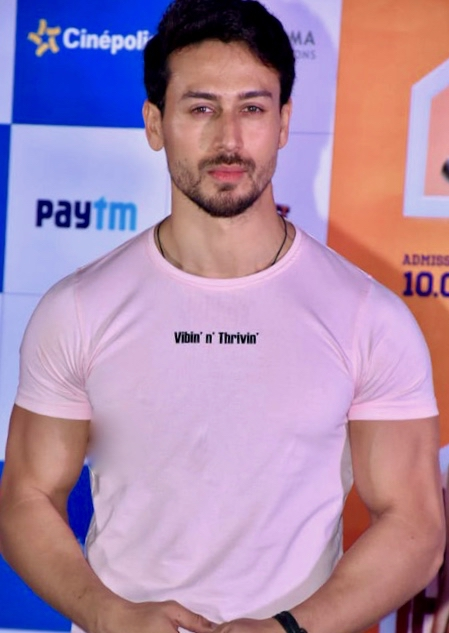
Tiger Shroff

=== Shantaram–Pendharkar–Talpade family ===
- V. Shantaram (director, producer and actor)
- Sandhya Shantaram (actress, third wife of Shantaram)
  - Kiran Shantaram (producer, son of Shantaram)
  - Rajshree (actress, daughter of Shantaram)
  - Jasraj (vocalist, son-in-law of Shantaram and belongs to Pandit family)
  - Ranjana Deshmukh (actress, niece to Sandhya Shantaram)
    - Durga Jasraj (daughter of Pandit Jasraj)
    - Siddharth Ray (actor, grandson of Shantaram)
    - Shantipriya (actress, wife of Siddharath Ray and sister of actress Bhanupriya)
- Bhalji Pendharkar (film maker, maternal cousin of Shantaram)
  - Prabhakar Pendharkar (writer, son of Bhalji)
- Baburao Pendharkar (elder brother of Bhalji, famous film personality)
- Master Vinayak (actor, brother of Bhalji)
  - Nanda (actress, daughter of Vinayak)
  - Jayshree T. (actress, sister-in-law of Nanda)
    - Shreyas Talpade (actor, nephew of Jayashree and Radhika)

=== Sinha family ===
- Shatrughan Sinha (actor and politician)
- Poonam Sinha (actress and producer)
  - Luv Sinha (actor, son of Shatrughan and Poonam Sinha)
  - Kush Sinha (actor, son of Shatrughan and Poonam Sinha)
  - Sonakshi Sinha (actress, daughter of Shatrughan and Poonam Sinha)
  - Zaheer Iqbal (actor, husband of Sonakshi Sinha)
  - Bhavna Ruparel (actress, cousin of Luv, Kush and Sonakshi)
  - Pooja Ruparel (actress, sister of Bhavna)

=== Sivakumar family ===
- Sivakumar (actor and social activist)
  - Suriya (actor, producer, singer and social activist, elder son of Sivakumar)
    - Jyothika (actress, producer, wife of Suriya)
      - Nagma(actress, half-sister of Jyothika)
      - Roshini (actress) (actress, sister of Jyothika)
  - Karthi (actor, Younger Son of Sivakumar)
  - Brindha Sivakumar (singer, dubbing artist, daughter of Sivakumar)
  - K. E. Gnanavel Raja (Producer, Distributor, cousin of Suriya and Karthi)
  - S. R. Prabhu (Producer, Distributor, cousin of Suriya and Karthi)

=== Sippy family ===
- G. P. Sippy (producer and director)
  - Ramesh Sippy (director, son of G. P. Sippy)
  - Geeta Sippy (ex-wife of Ramesh Sippy)
    - Sheena Sippy (daughter of Ramesh and Geeta, ex-wife of Kunal Kapoor son of Shashi Kapoor)
      - Zahan Kapoor (Son of Sheena and Kunal)
    - Rohan Sippy (director, producer, son of Ramesh and Geeta )
  - Kiran Juneja (actress, wife of Ramesh Sippy)

=== Suman family ===
- Shekhar Suman
  - Adhyayan Suman

=== Sukumaran family ===
- Sukumaran (Mollywood producer and character actor)
- Mallika Sukumaran (actress, wife of Sukumaran)
  - Indrajith Sukumaran (actor, son of Sukumaran and Mallika Sukumaran)
  - Poornima Indrajith (actress, fashion designer, Wife of Indrajith Sukumaran)
    - Prarthana Indrajith (actress, playback singer, elder daughter of Indrajith and Poornima)
  - Prithviraj Sukumaran (actor, director, producer, singer, second son of Sukumaran and Mallika Sukumaran)
    - Supriya (Producer, Media person, Wife of Prithviraj Sukumaran)

=== Suresh Gopi family ===
- Suresh Gopi (actor)
  - Gokul Suresh (actor, son of Suresh Gopi)

=== Suresh family ===
- G. Suresh Kumar (Actor, Producer)
- Menaka (Actress, Producer, wife of G. Suresh Kumar)
  - Revathy Suresh (Director, Producer, Creative Director, Elder daughter of G. Suresh Kumar, Wife of Nithin Mohan)
  - Keerthy Suresh (Actress, Second daughter of G. Suresh Kumar, Wife of Antony Thattil)

== T ==
=== Tandon–Makijany family ===
- Ravi Tandon (director and producer)
  - Raveena Tandon (actress, model, producer – daughter of Ravi Tandon)
  - Rakhi Vijan (actress, daughter-in-law of Ravi Tandon)
  - Kiran Rathod (actress, cousin of Raveena)
- Mac Mohan (actor – maternal uncle of Raveena Tandon)
  - Manjari Makijany (writer, director, producer – daughter of Mac Mohan)

== U ==
=== Uppalapati family ===
- Krishnam Raju (actor)
- Uppalapati Surya Narayana Raju (film producer, brother of Krishnam Raju and father of Prabhas)
  - Prabhas (actor, Krishnam Raju's nephew)
  - Siddharth Rajkumar (actor, nephew of Krishnam Raju)

== V ==
=== Varma family ===
Originating in the Punjab Province of British India, six brothers born to Laxmidas and Hakumdai Chawla, changed their last name to Varma after moving to Mumbai to enter the movie industry. They produced and distributed Hindi films and their descendants, both biological and those married into the family, continued this endeavour while making other contributions to the film industry as well. The family is also related to the Bhatt family, through actress and wife of Bhagwan Das Varma, Purnima Das Varma, whose sister, Shirin Mohammad Ali, was the mother of 6 of the 9 children of Nanabhai Bhatt, including producers Mukesh and Mahesh Bhatt, the father of Pooja Bhatt, Alia Bhatt and Rahul Bhatt.

Film personalities of the Varma Family
1st generation	2nd generation	3rd generation	4th generation	Career	Born	Died	Relation
Ramrakha Varma				Founder/Partner	1901	1967	The eldest of six brothers that founded Varma Films
Munshiram Varma				Founder/Partner, Producer	1902	1958	One of six brothers that founded Varma Films. Father of Madhu Makkar née Varma, Sunil Varma, and Pammy Varma; father-in-law of Surinder Makkar
	Surinder Makkar			Actor	1941	2019	Son-in-law of Munshiram Varma; spouse of Madhu Makkar née Varma; father of Sid Makkar
	Madhu Makkar			Actress	1947		Daughter of Munshiram Varma; spouse of Surinder Makkar; mother of Sid Makkar; sister of Sunil Varma and Pammy Varma
	Sunil Varma			Producer	1951	2009	Son of Munshiram Varma; brother of Madhu Makkar née Varma and Pammy Varma; uncle of Sid Makkar
	Pammy Varma			Assistant Director, Director	1952	2015	Son of Munshiram Varma; brother of Madhu Makkar née Varma and Sunil Varma; uncle of Sid Makkar
		Sid Makkar		Actor	1983		Son of Surinder Makkar and Madhu Makkar née Varma; grandson of Munshiram Varma; nephew of Sunil Varma and Pammy Varma
		Giriraj Kabra		Actor	1981		Spouse of Seher Kabra née Varma, granddaughter of Munshiram Varma
Biharilal Varma				Founder/Partner	1905	1974	One of six brothers that founded Varma Films
	Rajinder Varma			Distributor of Italian-language films	1936	2018	Son of Biharilal Varma
	Krishan Lal Varma			Producer	1938	2005	Son of Biharilal Varma
		Amit Varma		Actor	1984		Grandson of Biharilal Varma
Bhagwan Das Varma				Founder/Partner, Producer, Director, Writer	1907	1962	One of six brothers that founded Varma Films. Married Tarawanti and subsequently Purnima. Father of Jagdish Varma and Satpal Varma
Purnima				Actress	1934	2013	Spouse of Bhagwan Das Varma. Previously Purnima had been married to Syed Shauqat Hashmi
	Jagdish Varma			Producer	1939	2000	Son of Bhagwan Das Varma; brother of Satpal Varma
		Kawal Sharma		Director, Producer	1959		Spouse of Sabina Sharma née Varma, granddaughter of Bhagwan Das Varma, and daughter of Jagdish Varma
	Satpal Varma			Producer	1942	2004	Son of Bhagwan Das Varma; brother of Jagdish Varma
		Emraan Hashmi		Actor	1979		Emraan is the grandson of Purnima Das Varma who had married Bhagwan Das Varma, one of the founders of Varma Films. Purnima's son from her first marriage, Anwar Hashmi, is Emraan's father, making Bhagwandas Varma Emraan's step grandfather
Walatiram Varma				Founder/Partner	1915	1982	One of six brothers that founded Varma Films
	Surinder Kumar Sharma			Producer	1944	1998	Son-in-law of Walatiram Varma; spouse of Kusum Sharma née Varma (daughter of Walatiram Varma)
		Mihika Varma		Actress	1986		Granddaughter of Walatiram Varma
		Mishkat Varma		Actor	1989		Grandson of Walatiram Varma
Santram Varma				Founder/Partner	1921	1975	One of six brothers that founded Varma Films
	Sujit Kumar			Actor, Producer	1934	2010	Son-in-law of Santram Varma; spouse of Kiran Singh (daughter of Santram Varma), brother-in-law of Aroon Varma
	Kiran Singh			Producer	1947	2005	Daughter of Santram Varma; spouse of Sujit Kumar; sister of Aroon Varma
	Aroon Varma			Producer	1943	2012	Son of Santram Varma, brother of Kiran Singh née Varma
		Jatin Kumar		Producer	1975		Son of Sujit Kumar and Kiran Singh née Varma; grandson of Santram Varma; nephew of Aroon Varma.
		Zulfi Syed		Actor	1976		Spouse of Sheena Varma, granddaughter of Santram Varma
		Rajiv Menon		Screenplay Writer	1971		Spouse of Dimple Varma, granddaughter of Santram Varma
Sumitra Varma					1910	1985	Sister of the six brothers that founded Varma Films
		Chandan Arora		Director/Film Editor	1972		Spouse of Minal Arora née Varma, granddaughter of Sumitra Varma
			Kabeer Arora	Music Composer	2000		Son of Chandan Arora and Minal Arora née Varma; great grandson of Sumitra Varma

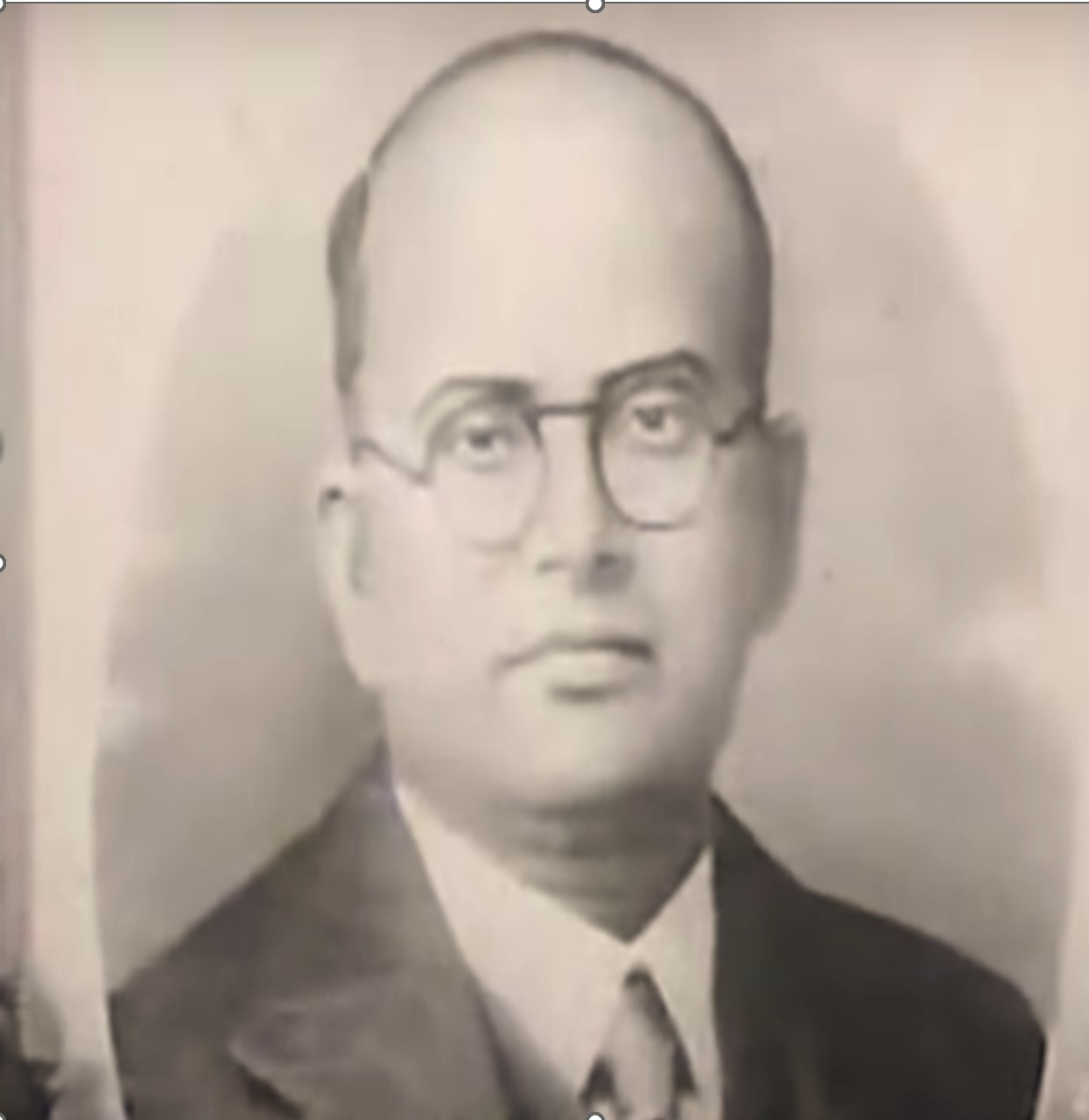
Munshiram Varma

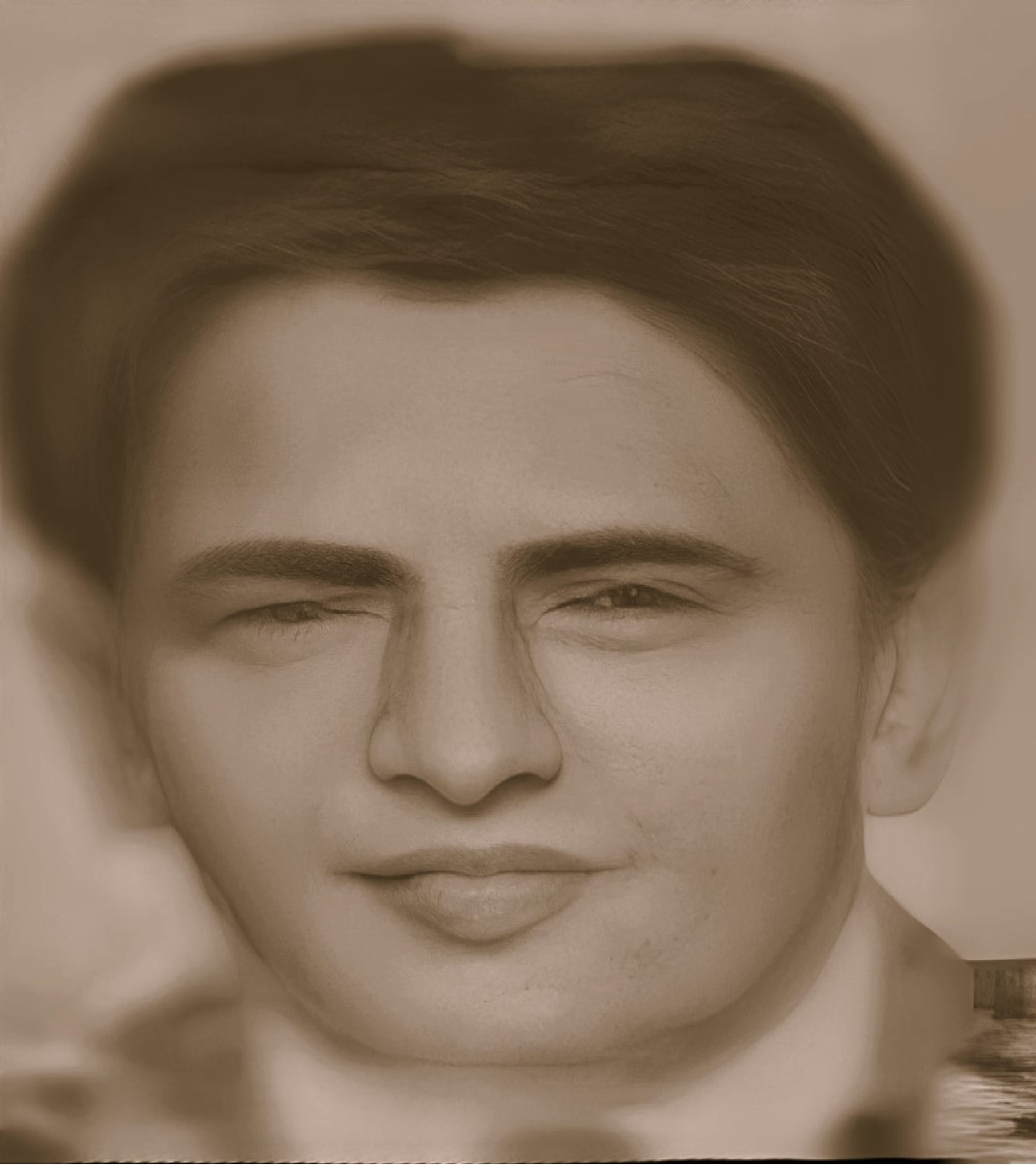
Bhagwan Das Varma

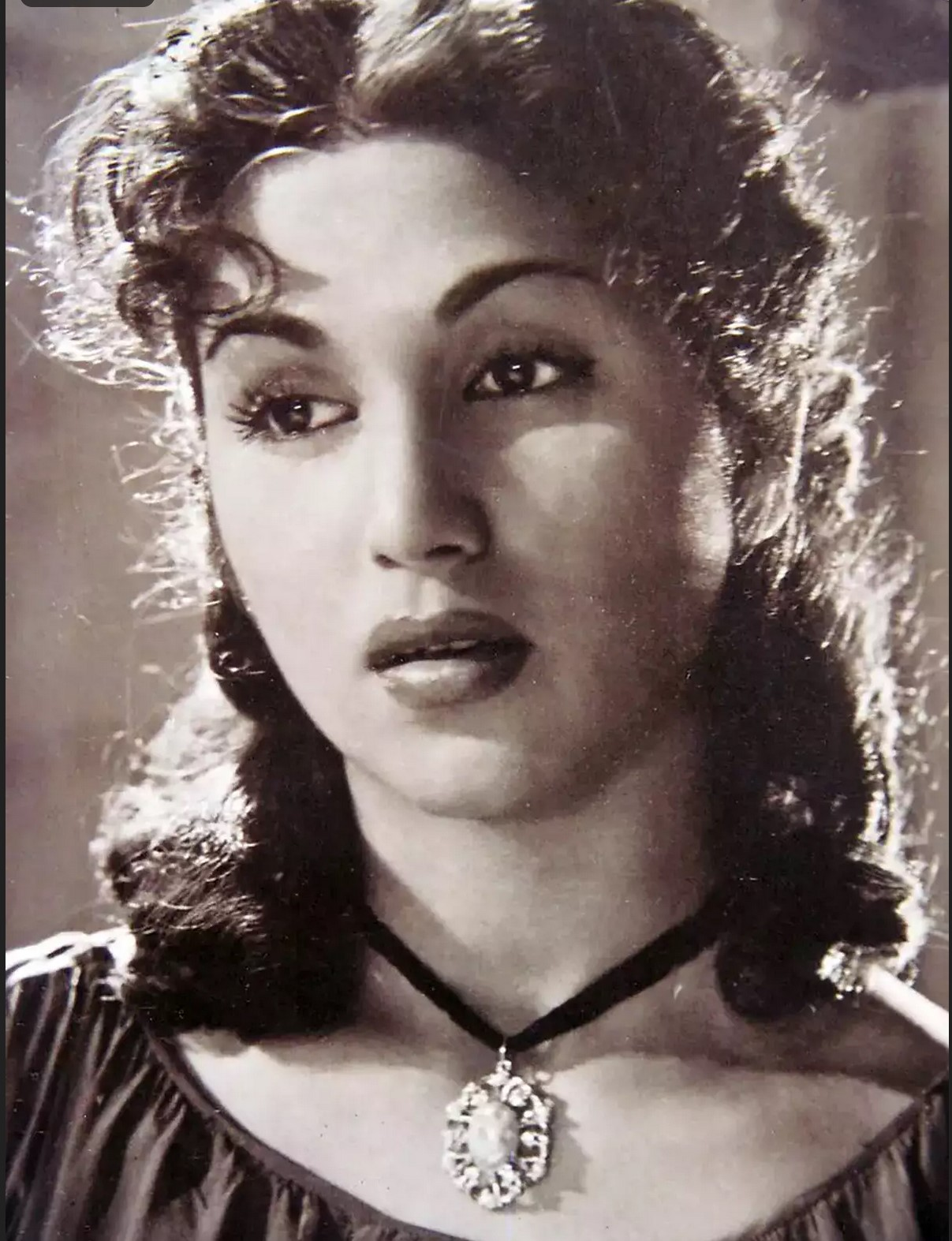
Purnima

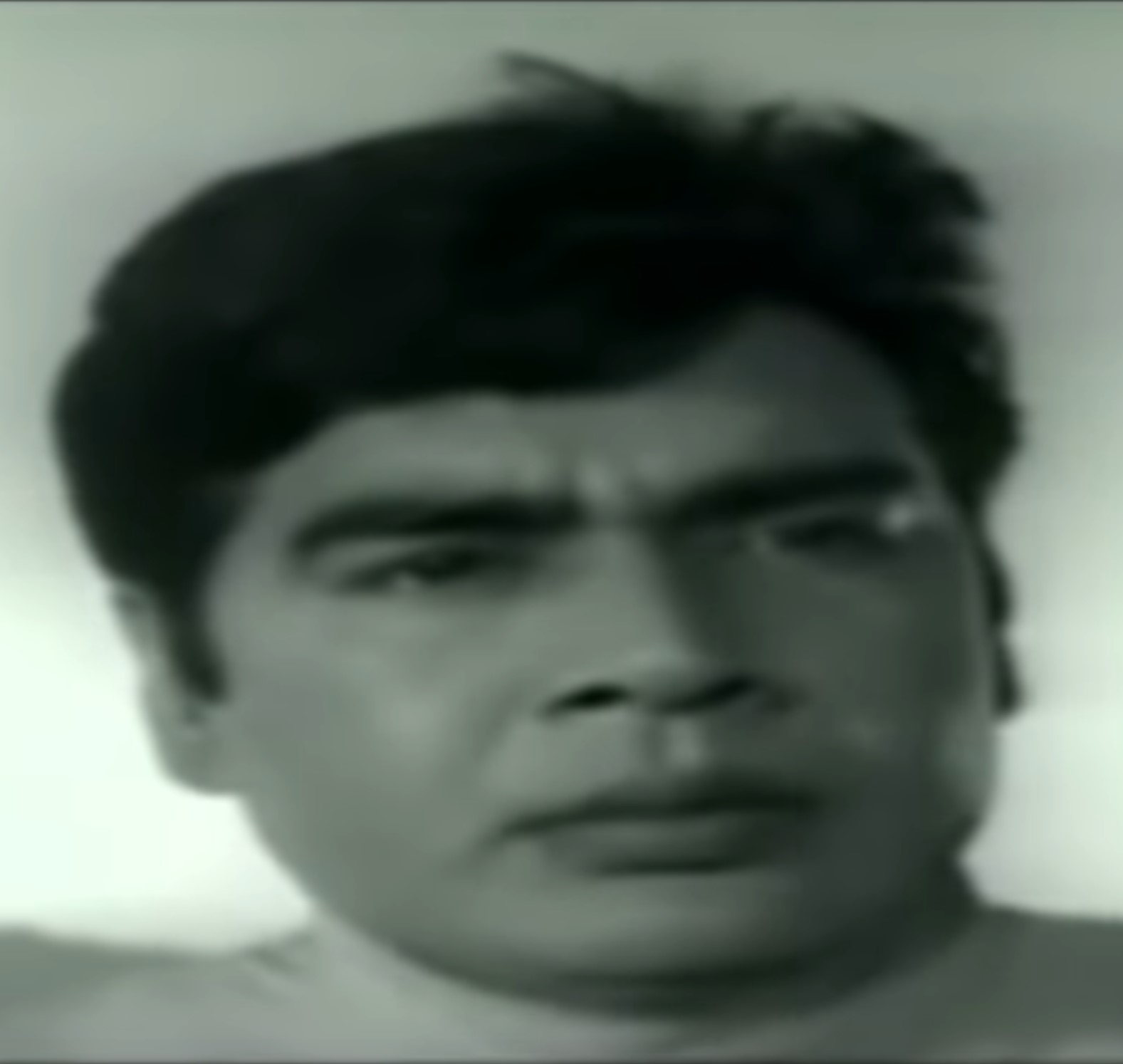
Sujit Kumar

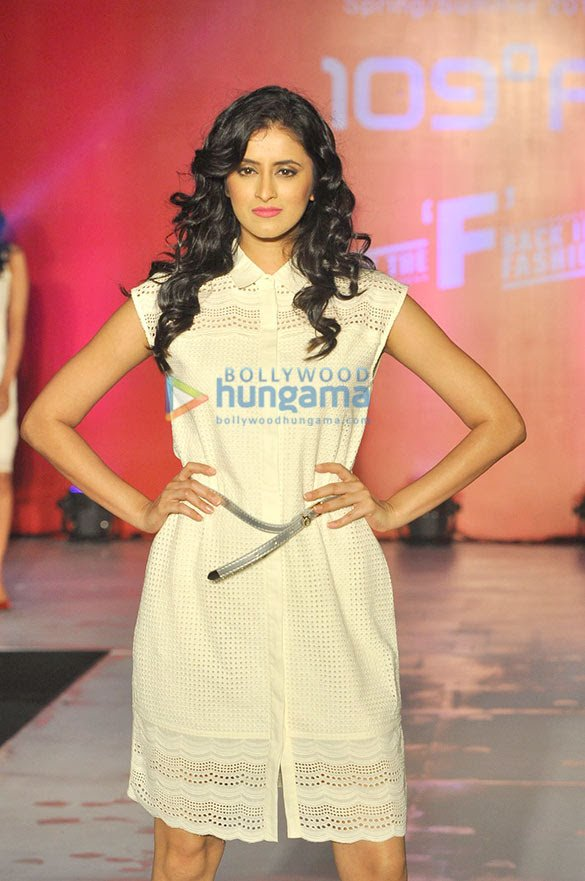
Mihika Varma

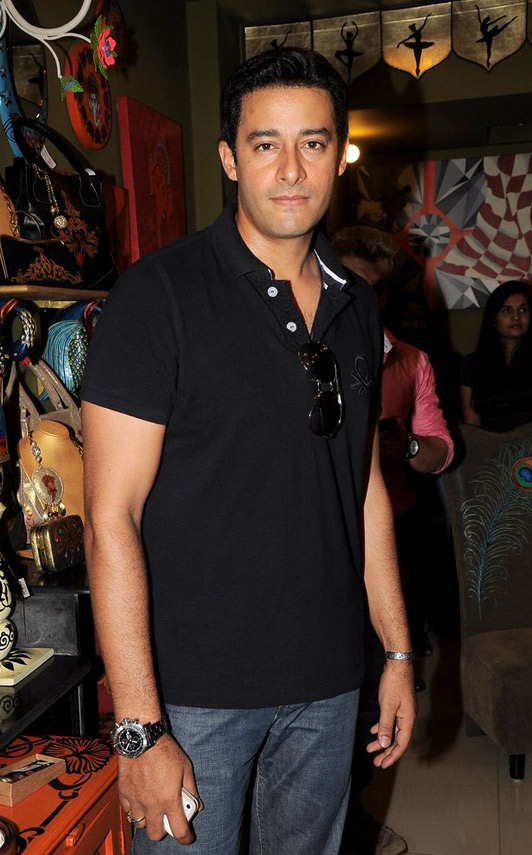
Zulfi Syed

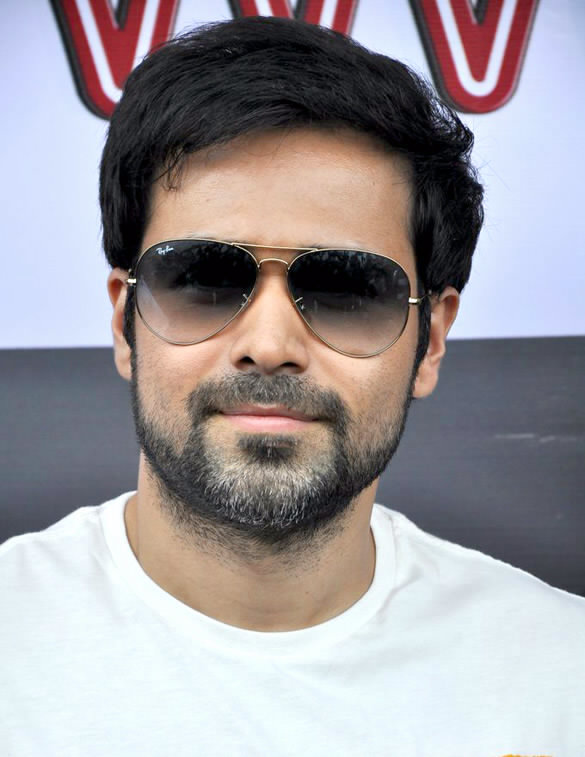
Emraan Hashmi

== See also ==
- List of Indian music families
- Hindi cinema content lists
- List of entertainment industry dynasties
- Nepotism
