= K. Raghunath =

Indian diplomat (born 1939)

Krishnan Raghunath

Indian Ambassador to East Germany
- In office 23 April 1979 – 1982
- Preceded by: es:Roy Axel Khan
- Succeeded by: Prabhakar Menon

Indian Ambassador to Philippines
- In office 1987–1990

Indian High Commissioner to Nigeria
- In office 1990–1990
- Preceded by: es:Deb Mukharji
- Succeeded by: Lalit Mansingh

21st Foreign Secretary (India)
- In office 1 July 1997 – 1 December 1999
- Preceded by: Salman Haidar
- Succeeded by: Lalit Mansingh

Indian de:Liste der indischen Botschafter in der Sowjetunion und Russland to Russia
- In office 2001–2004
- Preceded by: Satinder Kumar Lambah
- Succeeded by: Kanwal Sibal

Personal details
- Born: 13 November 1939 (age 86) Madras
- Spouse: Sunny
- Education: La Martiniere College
- Occupation: Politician

Krishnan Raghunath is an Indian diplomat who served as the Foreign Secretary of India in the late 1990s. He previously served as the Indian High Commissioner to Bangladesh as well as Ambassador to Russia, Nigeria and the Philippines.

== Biography ==
He graduated from the prestigious Madras Christian College. K. Raghunath went to school at La Martiniere Boys' College in Lucknow, India.

He joined the Indian Foreign service in 1962. He married, Sunny, in 1975.

- In June 1967, Chinese authorities expelled Krishnan Raghunath and Vijai Padmanab two Indian diplomats on charges of espionage. India retaliated by expelling two members of the Chinese embassy in New Delhi.
- From 1978 to April 1979 he was counsellor in the Indian Embassy in Moscow.

He became Foreign Secretary on 1 July 1997 when he took over from Salman Haidar.

In 2001 he became the Indian ambassador to Russia, taking over from Mr S.K. Lambah.

Diplomatic posts
| Preceded by Krishnan Srinivasan | High Commissioner of India to Bangladesh; 1989 - 1992 | Succeeded by Deb Mukherjee |
| Preceded by Salman Haidar | Foreign Secretary of India; 1997 - 1999 | Succeeded by Lalit Mansingh |
| Preceded by Satinder Kumar Lambah | Ambassador of India to Russia; 2001 - 2004 | Succeeded by Kanwal Sibal |
