= Mayadhar Mansingh =

Indian poet and writer (1905-1973)

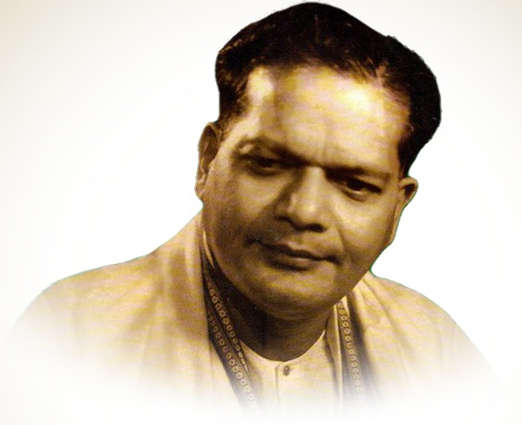
- Born: Mayadhar Mansingh; 13 November 1905; Nandala, Puri District
- Died: 11 October 1973 (aged 67); Cuttack, Orissa, India
- Resting place: Cuttack
- Children: Lalit Mansingh (Son) Lalu Mansinha (son) Nivedita (daughter) Labanyendu (son) (deceased) Sanghamitra(deceased)
- Writing career
- Language: Odia
- Notable works: Konarka; Ei Sahakara tale

Mayadhar Mansingh (13 November 1905 – 11 October 1973) was an Indian poet and writer who wrote in Odia. He received the Padma Shri, the fourth-highest civilian award in India, in 1967.

== Personal life ==
Mansingh was born in Nandala village, Ramalenka Grampanchayat, Krushnaprasad Tahasil of Puri district, Odisha, India. He was married to Hemalata and had 5 children. From oldest to youngest, "Lalatendu, Lalitendu, Labanyendu (deceased) and Nivedita and the youngest daughter, Sanghamitra(deceased)." His second son was a former diplomat, Foreign Secretary of India, a former High Commissioner of India to the UK, and a former Ambassador of India to the United States, Lalit Mansingh.

== Career ==
Mansingh's literary contributions include essays, poetic plays and long narrative poems. He also authored several research articles on the History of Odisha.He also worked as Head of the Jnankosh Project of Utkal University. His poetic style is profuse with the use of romantic and erotic metaphor, for which he has earned the appellation "Prēmika kabi" (Lover poet) in Odia literature. He wrote books like The Saga of the Land of Jagannatha (English) which portrays vividly the ancient history of Odisha. He also wrote books in Odia like Mahatabani, Geeta Mahatmya and Sarbajanina Geeta, which were published by J. Mohapatra & co (Now Mass Media Pvt Ltd), Cuttack. The Saga of the Land of Jagannatha is published by Mass Media Pvt Ltd. Some of his notable works include poems Krushna, Kamalayana, Kōṇārka and Ēi sahakāra taḷē.

Mansingh authored several research articles on the history of Odia literature, a subject in which he had abiding interest. He also authored a history of the Odia language, documenting the general use of the language, as also the development of Odia literature. The treatise, Ōḍiā Sāhitẏara Itihāsa (History of Odia language), was published in 1962.

Mansingh has also introduced some works of William Shakespeare into Odia literature. He has translated Shakespeare's Hamlet and Othello into Odia.

== Literary contribution ==
=== Poetry ===
- Dhũpa
- Sadhaba jhia
- Jema
- Malayana
- Konark
- Pujajemi
- Rūpadēbatā
- Dūrē raha
- Hemasasya
- Hemapuspa
- Palīsandhẏā
- Mahānadīrē jẏōtsnā bihāra
- Kamalayana
- Premasasya
- Upekhita
- Matti bani
- Jibana chita
- Akhyata
- Krudha
- Sindhu bindhu
- Nikyana

=== Essay ===
- Ōḍiā Sāhitẏara Itihāsa ("History of Odia language") (1962)

Saraswati Fakiramohan (Biography of Fakirmohan Senapati) Sikshabitra Gatha ("Story of an Educationist") Kabi O Kabita ("Poet and Poetry")

=== Translation ===
He translated famous Shakespeare tragedy Hamlet and Othello in Odia.

== Dr Mayadhar Mansingh Memorial High School ==
Dr Mayadhar Mansingh Memorial High School is established in the year 1982 in Nandala Village of Krushnaprasad.

== See also ==
- Parikud
