= BBAU (disambiguation) =

BBAU may refer to:

- Babasaheb Bhimrao Ambedkar University, a central university situated in Lucknow, Uttar Pradesh, India
- Big Brother (Australian TV series), Australian reality show
