= Hira Lal Sibal =

Indian lawyer

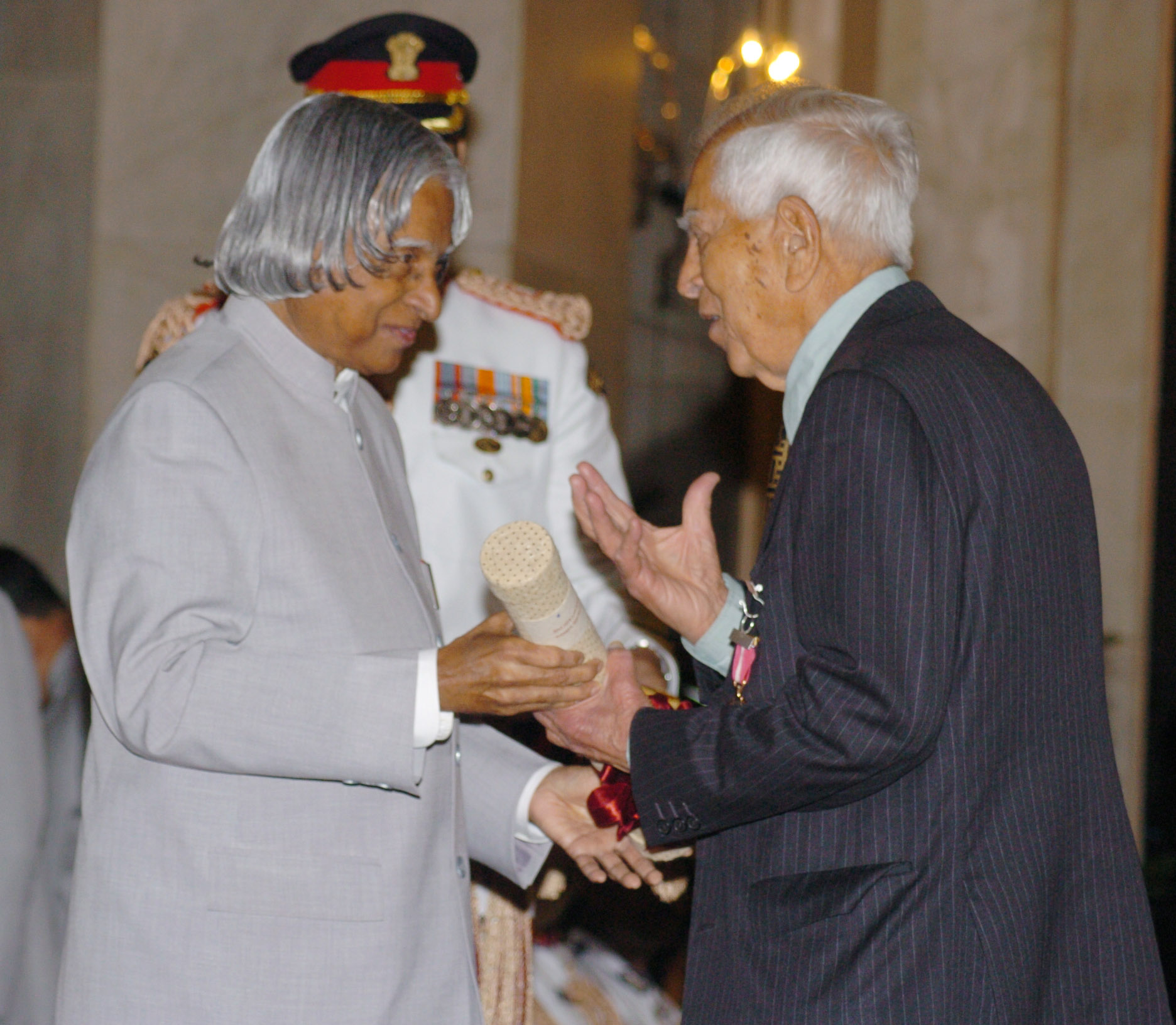
- Hira Lal Sibal receiving Padma Bhushan from president Dr. A.P.J. Abdul Kalam.

Advocate General of Haryana
- In office 24 June 1991 – 10 May 1996
- In office 4 February 1985 – 11 July 1986

Advocate General of Punjab
- In office 11 April 1970 – 24 January 1972
- In office 10 June 1968 – 19 February 1969

Personal details
- Born: 24 September 1914 Lahore, Punjab, British India
- Died: 29 December 2012 (aged 98) Chandigarh, India
- Children: Kanwal Sibal; Kapil Sibal
- Occupation: Lawyer
- Awards: Padma Bhushan; Punjab Rattan Award; Living Legend of Law

Hira Lal Sibal (24 September 1914 – 29 December 2012) was an Indian lawyer, jurist and two-time Advocate General of Punjab and Haryana, known for his legal defence of cases against the noted Urdu writers, Ismat Chugtai and Saadat Hasan Manto in 1945. He practised at Punjab and Haryana High Court and the Supreme Court of India.

Sibal started his practice in 1937 at Lahore of British India and moved to Shimla in 1948 after the Indian independence but later settled in Chandigarh in 1955 to practise at the Punjab and Haryana High Court. He served as the Advocate General for the States of Punjab and Haryana, for two terms each, respectively but was reported to have declined an offer to become a judge of the Punjab and Haryana High Court. During his Lahore days, he successfully defended Malik Ghulam Nabi, who would later become a minister in the Zulfikar Ali Bhutto government, in a kidnapping case and was the counsel for Ismat Chugtai and Saadat Hasan Manto in the cases against them for indecent writing in 1945; the former was fined ₹90 while the latter was acquitted.

Sibal was a recipient of the Punjab Rattan Award of the Government of Punjab and the International Bar Association awarded him the Living Legend of Law honor in 1994. The Government of India awarded him the third highest civilian honour of the Padma Bhushan, in 2006, for his contributions to Law. He died on 29 December 2012, at the age of 98. Virender Sibal and Jitendar Sibal, the elder two of his sons are former Indian Administrative Service officers while the third son, Kanwal Sibal, is a former Foreign Secretary of India. The youngest of the sons, Kapil Sibal, is a noted senior lawyer, a politician aligned with the Indian National Congress and a former Union Minister who held various portfolios in the UPA Government from 2009 to 2014.

== See also ==
- Kanwal Sibal
- Kapil Sibal
