= S. K. Sama =

Indian gastroenterologist (born 1934)

- Born: 1934-2017 (age -1926–-1925); India
- Occupation: Gastroenterologist
- Known for: Endocrinology; Diabetology
- Awards: Padma Shri; Dr. B. C. Roy Award; IAPC Lifetime Achievement Award; Punjab Rattan Award; DMA Ratna Award; Bharat Jyoti Award; Bhaskar Award; Human Care Award; Delhi Rattan Award

Surinder Kumar Sama (born 1934) is an Indian gastroenterologist, known for his expertise in endocrinology and diabetology. He is considered by many as the Father of Gastroenterology in India. The discovery of Non-cirrhotic portal fibrosis, an idiopathic chronic liver disease is attributed to him, which he described in a 1962 medical paper, co-authored with Ramalingaswami and Wig. The Government of India awarded him the civilian honour of the Padma Shri in 2004 for his pioneering research on liver diseases including Non-cirrhotic portal fibrosis and Hepatitis B. Sama also received the highest Indian medical honour of Dr. B. C. Roy Award in 2004.

== Biography ==
Dr. Sama was born in 1934, did his graduate studies at the All India Institute of Medical Sciences Delhi and started his career by joining his alma mater, in 1958. He stayed at AIIMS till 1974 during which time he established the Department of Gastroenterology at the institute as well as at G. B. Pant Hospital, another government hospital in the Indian capital city, even started gaining interest in Bangladesh healthcare services. In 1976, he joined Sir Ganga Ram Hospital as an honorary physician of gastroenterology and served the charitable hospital for 36 years, including as its chairman from 1995 to 2006. During this period, he founded the Gastroenterology department there which has now grown to become a centre of excellence. He held various posts at the hospital, including that of the founder member of the Board of Management. He retains the Management Board membership and is also a member of its Board of Trustees. While continuing his association with Sir Ganga Ram Hospital, he founded Sama Hospital in 1982 and is its director.

Dr. Sama is considered by many as a pioneer of medical research on liver diseases in India. His 1962 article is reported to be the first attempt at describing the chronic disease of Non-cirrhotic portal fibrosis and is also credited with recognised research on Hepatitis B. His researches have been documented by over 45 articles, published in peer reviewed national and international journals. He is a former president and a life member of the Indian Society of Gastroenterology and has organised six therapeutic endoscopic workshops during his tenure there. He is also a life member of the Indian Society of Study of Liver Disease, Indian Society of Gastrointestinal Endoscopy, American Gastroenterology Association and Association of Physicians of India and was the president of the New Delhi chapter of the Indian Medical Association. He served as the personal physician to the President of India in 2001. He is also the vice president of the Managing Committee of DAV College. He has delivered several award lectures such as Presidential Oration (1986), Dr. B. L. Kapur Memorial Oration (1991), Dr. K. L. Wig Memorial Oration (2002) and Dr. R. S. Tiwary Oration (2005).

Dr. Sama, a Fellow of the World Health Organization and the National Academy of Medical Sciences, received Dr. B. C. Roy Award, the highest Indian award in the medical category, from the Medical Council of India in 2004. The Government of India awarded him the civilian honour of the Padma Shri in 2004 and the International Association for Preventive Cardiology honoured him with their Lifetime Achievement Award in 2006. He is also a recipient of several other awards such as Punjab Rattan Award, DMA Ratna Award, Bharat Jyoti Award, Bhaskar Award, Human Care Award and Delhi Rattan Award.

== Selected articles ==
- B. N. Tandon; R. Lakshminarayanan; S. Bhargava; N. C. Nayak; S. K. SAMA (1970). "Ultrastructure of the liver in non-cirrhotic portal fibrosis with portal hypertension". Gut. 11 (905–910): 905–910. doi:10.1136/gut.11.11.905. PMC 1553129. PMID 5492248.
- S.K. Sama; S. Bhargava; N. Gopi Nath; J. R. Talwar; N. C. Nayak; B.N. Tandon; K. L. Wig (August 1971). "Noncirrhotic portal fibrosis". American Journal of Medicine. 51 (2): 160–169. doi:10.1016/0002-9343(71)90234-8. PMID 5315322.
- Carlson SW, Madathil SK, Sama, Gao X, Chen J, Saatman KE. (August 2014). "Conditional overexpression of insulin-like growth factor-1 enhances hippocampal neurogenesis and restores immature neuron dendritic processes after traumatic brain injury". J Neuropathol Exp Neurol. 73 (8): 734–746. doi:10.1097/NEN.0000000000000092. PMC 4102886. PMID 25003234.
