= Ranbir Chander Sobti =

Indian educationist and cell biologist

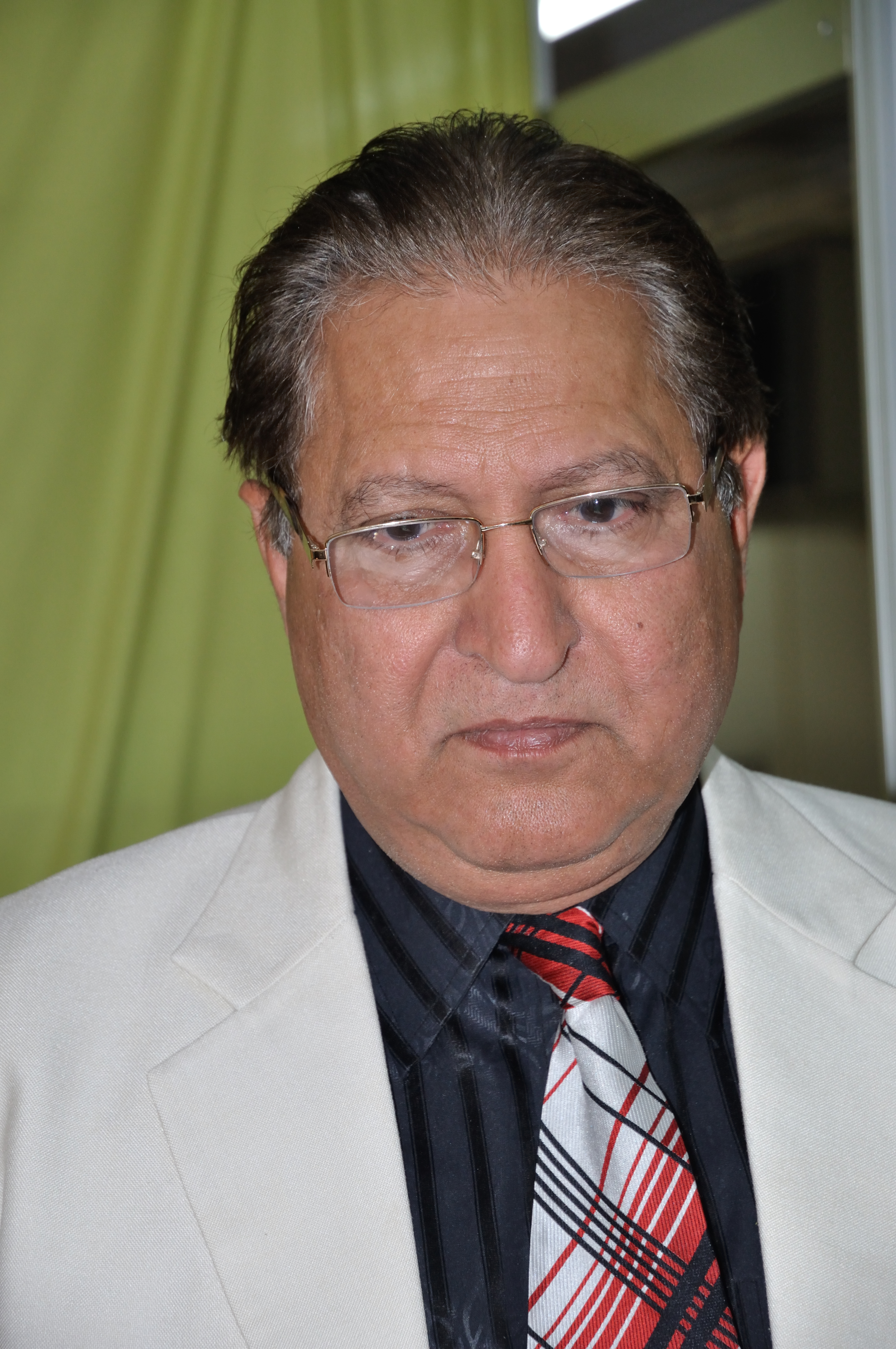
- Sobti in Kolkata on 25 February 2012
- Born: 19 August 1948 (age 78); Tarn Taran, East Punjab, India
- Occupations: Cell Biologist; Educationist

Ranbir Chander Sobti is an Indian educationist, cell biologist. He is a former vice chancellor of the Panjab University, Chandigarh and Babasaheb Bhimrao Ambedkar University, Lucknow. He is known to have involved in advanced research in plant genetic studies and has written over 240 articles, and 22 books including Essentials of Biotechnology and Emerging Trends in Biomedical Science and Health. He is an elected Fellow of several major science academies such as Indian National Science Academy, National Academy of Agricultural Sciences, National Academy of Medical Sciences, National Academy of Sciences, India, and Punjab Academy of Sciences. The Government of India awarded him the fourth highest civilian honour of the Padma Shri, in 2009, for his contributions to Literature and Education.

== Biography ==
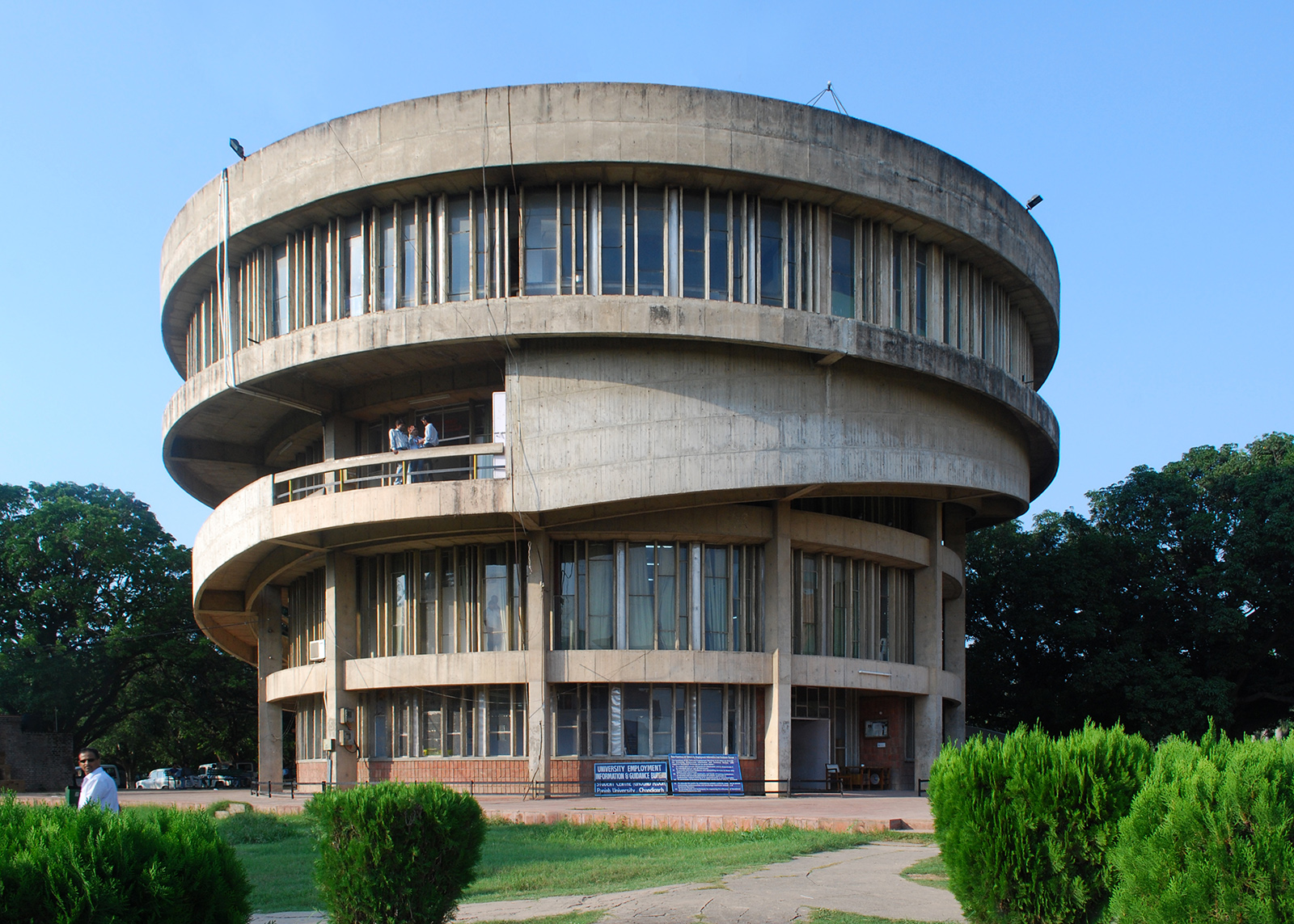
Panjab University Student Centre

Ranbir Chander Sobti graduated in Science (BSc) with honours from Panjab University in 1969. He continued his studies at the same institution to secure his master's degree (MSc) in 1970 and a doctoral degree (PhD) in 1974. While doing his doctoral research, he also passed a certificate course in German language in 1971. His career started as a teaching assistant in 1974 at his alma mater where he worked for 28 years. He served the institution in various capacities such as Curator (1975–1976), Lecturer (1976–1985), Reader (1985–1994) and Professor in Cell Biology (1994–2006) when he was appointed as the vice chancellor of the university. In between, he took a hiatus and worked at the University of Miami, Florida as a resident associate professor during two periods, 1976–1980 and 1983–1985. During his stay at Miami, he successfully completed the course of Master of Science in Public Health (MSPH) in 1983.

In 2006, Sobti assumed the responsibility as the vice chancellor of Panjab University and continued in the post till 2012. He also worked as the Dean of the Alumni Relations (1998–1999) and Foreign Students (2001–2004), as the honorary director of the Honorary Director of the UGC Academic Staff College (2004–2006) and as the chairman, Board of Examiners of the Department of Electronics and Accreditation of Computer Classes (DOAECC). In 2012, he moved to Babasaheb Bhimrao Ambedkar University (BBAU) as its vice chancellor and held the position till 2018. When the Indian Science Congress Association conducted their 101st annual session at Jammu, he chaired the session as its general president. He has also served as the director of the National Research Development Corporation (NRDC) and as a member of the executive council of the National Assessment and Accreditation Council (NAAC), Bangalore. He headed the panel of NAAC which conducted an appraisal on the Tripura University in 2015. He is a member of Zaheer Science Foundation, a New Delhi-based non government organization promoting scientific research and educational reforms, in coordination with government agencies.

Sobti is married to Vipin Khindagi; the marriage took place on 8 October 1975, while he was working as a curator at Panjab University.

== Legacy ==
The Centre of Biotechnology of the Panjab University was established during Sobti's tenure as the Reader of the Department of Zoology at the university and he worked as the founder coordinator of the centre from 1989 to 1995. His efforts are reported behind the elevation of the Centre into a department in 1995 and he chaired the department till 2005, except for a period from February 2001 to September 2002. While he served as the vice chancellor, the university started 65 industry-oriented courses, established a dedicated post of Dean for the research department, established chairs for contemporary and traditional thought and introduced semester system for all academic courses. It was during this period, the university received over ₹ 800 million in research grants and ₹ 3 billion in government funding. With the funding, he helped establish regional centres and colleges in rural areas and initiated programs to provide preferential admission to AIDS/Thalassemia patients and single girl child families at the affiliated colleges and university campus and provided free education to orphans and differently abled students. The university also took up the responsibility to adopt 8 nearby villages and set up facilities there for computer literacy, community health and language learning. In 2011, a community radio service under the name, Jyotirgmaya 91.2 MHz, was launched for exchange of knowledge and information among the participating communities and to provide a dialogue platform for them. It was under his vice chancellorship at the Babasaheb Bhimrao Ambedkar University, the institution started its collaboration with Uttar Pradesh Council for Science and Technology (UPCST) and North Eastern Railway (NER), Lucknow Division for innovations in the public sector services. He established the Centre for Industry Institution Partnership Program (CIIPP), a forum for dialogue between industry representatives and academicians, and also contributed in making the university campus, a smoke-free and polythene-free green campus.

Sobti's early researches were linked to cancer biology and some of his writings, which comprise 22 books and 246 articles, were based on his cancer researches. ResearchGate, an online repository of scientific articles, has listed 156 of his articles and they are reported to have been cited over 2000 times, with an h-index of 18. He has handled several projects for University Grants Commission, Council of Scientific and Industrial Research, Indian Council of Medical Research, Department of Biotechnology and the Ministry of Human Resource Development and has been a member of the Editorial Boards of journals such as Molecular and Cellular Biochemistry, Cytology and Genetics, and the Indian Journal of Human Genetics. He has participated in several seminars and conferences for delivering keynote addresses; his oration, Universities and the innovation cycle, at the centenary conference of the Association of Commonwealth Universities in 2015, was one among them. The 12th Dr. J. C. Bose Memorial Lecture of Institution of Electronics and Telecommunication Engineers (2006), Sir Shri Ram Memorial Oration (2007), D. D. Jain Oration (2007) and Dr. G. S. Randhawa Oration (2009) are some of the other lectures delivered by him.

== Awards and honours ==
The National Academy of Sciences, India (NASI) elected Sobdi as its Fellow in 1992 and the National Academy of Medical Sciences (NAMS) and the National Academy of Agricultural Sciences (NAAS) followed suit by electing him as their Fellow in 2003 and 2011 respectively. He has also been inducted into the elected Fellows list by the Indian National Science Academy (2012), Punjab Academy of Sciences, Zoological Society, Institution of Chemical Engineers, International Academy of Cardiovascular Sciences, Union for International Cancer Control, and the Comprehensive Cancer Centre for State of Florida.

Sobti received the INSA Young Scientist Medal of the Indian National Science Academy and the Science Award of the Kothari Scientific and Research Commission in 1977. A year later, he was awarded the Indo-UK Young Scientist Exchange Program Award, followed by the Indo-France Exchange Program Award in 1986, INSA-Royal Society Exchange Program Award in 1988 and INSA–Japan Society Exchange Program Award in 1994. He received four awards in 2008, Career Award of the University Grants Commission, B. C. Guha Memorial Award, Amity Academic Excellence Award, Punjab Sarkar Parman Patra, and four more awards in 2009, Life Time Achievement Award of the National Open and Distance Education Board, Yokohama National University International Exchange Foundation Award, Jai Prakash Memorial Education Award, and the fourth highest Indian civilian award of the Padma Shri. Chaudhary Devi Lal Manch Educational Award and the Prof. P. N. Mehra Memorial Award reached him in 2010 and he received the General President's Gold Medal of the Indian Science Congress Association and Swami Vivekananda National Award in 2011. He was awarded the PMA Excellence in Education Award in 2012 and the Punjab Academy of Sciences honoured him with the Lifetime Achievement Award in 2013. He is also a recipient of the Ranbaxy Research Award and Punjab Rattan Award.

== Selected bibliography ==
- R. C. Sobti (Author), G. Obe (Editor) (1991). Eukaryotic Chromosomes: Structural and Functional Aspects. Springer-Verlag. p. 295. ISBN 978-0387519029.
- Sobti, R.C.; Obe, G., eds. (2002). Some Aspects of Chromosome Structure and Function. Springer. p. 238. ISBN 978-0792370574.
- Sobti, R.C.; Krishan, Awtar, eds. (2003). Advanced Flow Cytometry: Applications in Biological Research. Springer. p. 114. ISBN 9781402014840.
- R. C. Sobti (2008). Essentials of Modern Biology. ANE Books. ISBN 9788180521386.
- R.C. Sobti; Suparna S. Pachouri (2008). Essentials of Biotechnology. CRC Press. p. 750. ISBN 9781420082845.
- D.V. Rai; R.C. Sobti; Raj Bahadur (2009). Emerging Trends in Biomedical Science and Health. I K International Publishing House. p. 272. ISBN 9789380026220.
- R. C. Sobti (2011). Animal Physiology. Narosa Publishing House. p. 870. ISBN 9788173191930.
- R. C. Sobti (2012). Pathological Zoology. Alpha Science Intl. p. 600. ISBN 9781842654552.

== See also ==
- Babasaheb Bhimrao Ambedkar University
- Indian Science Congress Association
- Panjab University, Chandigarh
