= Nina Sibal =

Indian diplomat and writer (1948–2000)

- Born: Nina Singh; 2 August 1948; Pune, Bombay Province, India
- Died: June 2000 (aged 51–52); New York City, U.S.
- Education: Delhi University
- Occupation: Indian Foreign Service
- Spouse: Kapil Sibal (m. 1973)
- Children: 2
- Writing career
- Genres: Short story, novel

Nina Sibal (born Nina Singh, 2 August 1948 – June 2000) was an Indian diplomat and writer, known for her prize-winning novel Yatra and other English-language fiction as well as for her work in the Indian Foreign Service.

== Biography ==
She was born in Pune to an Indian father and Greek mother. After an MA in English at Delhi University (in Miranda House) she lectured there for three years. She also qualified in law and studied French. In 1972 Sibal joined the Indian Foreign Service and started work at the United Nations in New York City. Later she told a journalist that this threw her into "the deepest culture shock". Other postings included Cairo and three years as deputy director-general of the Indian Council for Cultural Relations. In 1992 she became India's permanent delegate to UNESCO in Paris, and went to New York in 1995 to be director of its liaison office there.

She was married to the lawyer and politician Kapil Sibal, with whom she had two sons. While both spouses pursued demanding careers they maintained a "transcontinental" marriage according to politician, diplomat and writer Shashi Tharoor. She died from breast cancer in New York in June 2000. A Nina Sibal Memorial Award was endowed by her husband. The All India Women's Education Fund Association gives the award annually to an individual who plays a leading role in an organisation using innovative methods to help disabled and disadvantaged children.

== Writing ==
Sibal's fiction was noticed in 1985 when her short story What a blaze of glory won an Asiaweek short story competition. It was later included in an anthology called Prize Winning Asian Fiction published in 1991.

Yatra, a novel published in 1987, covers more than a century in the life of a Sikh family. Their movements over time reflect the title: "Yatra" means journey or pilgrimage. Critics comment on the book's magical realism, especially with respect to one character's changing skin colour, and make comparisons with Salman Rushdie's Midnight's Children. The author uses mythical elements in her story. Themes include the Chipko movement, the history of the Punjab, the origin of Bangla Desh, and the heroine's search for a father. The novel can be criticised for being too crowded with multiple themes, but overall it was generally well received. It won the 1987 International Grand Prix for Literature in Algiers.

The Secret Life of Gujjar Mal, Sibal's collection of short stories, was published in 1991. The stories are set in a variety of different countries, some of them disguised with fictional names: Mulgary echoes Bulgaria during the Cold War, for example. These settings are not used simply as political or colourful backgrounds but are intertwined with the lives and emotions of the characters. As well as the title story the collection contains six other stories: By his death, Swimming, The face of Dadarao, Fur boots, Sanctuary and The man who seeks enlightenment.

Her 1998 novel, The Dogs of Justice, is set in Kashmir and tells the story of a rich Muslim girl. It was less well-received than Sibal's previous two books, with one critic saying it did not live up to the promise of the earlier works.

== Works ==
- Yatra: the journey, Women's Press, 1987, ISBN 9780704350090
- The secret life of Gujjar Mal and other stories, Women's Press, 1991. ISBN 9780704342712
- The Dogs of Justice. Orient Blackswan. 1998. pp. 334–. ISBN 978-81-7530-021-7.

== See also ==
- List of Indian writers
- Tapan Kumar Pradhan
- Mandakranta Sen
