= Shashank (diplomat) =

Indian diplomat

25th Foreign Secretary of India
- In office 19 November 2003 – 31 July 2004
- Preceded by: Kanwal Sibal
- Succeeded by: Shyam Saran

Shashank (born 1944) is a former foreign secretary of India. He was secretary from December 2003 to July 2004. He also served as India's Ambassador to Denmark, South Korea and Libya.

He is son of Madan Mohan and Kamala. He married Kalpana they have one daughter and one son. He is Master of Science in Physics. In 1966 he joined the Indian Foreign Service. From 1968 to 1971 he was 3rd. Sec./2nd. Secy. in the City of Brussels (Belgium). From 1972 to 1973 he was 1st. Secy. in Hanoi. From 1974 to 1976 he was Under Sec./Dep. Sec. in the Ministry of External Affairs (India). From 1976 to 1979 he was Dep. Sec. in the Permanent Mission of India before the Headquarters of the United Nations New York City. From 1979 to 1982 he was 1st. Secy./Counsellor in Cairo. From 1982 to 1986 he was minister in Islamabad. From 1986 to 1991 he was Joint Secretary in charge of the Passport Office of the Ministry of External Affairs (India). From 1991 to 1994 he was Ambassador to Tripoli (Libya) and concurrently High Commissioner to Valletta (Malta). In 1994 he was Ambassador to Seoul (South Korea). From 1994 to 1999 he was Ambassador to Jakarta (Indonesia). From March 1999 to 2001 he was Ambassador to Copenhagen (Denmark From 19 November 2003 to 31 July 2004 he was Foreign Secretary (India).

Diplomatic posts
Preceded by Kanwal Sibal	Foreign Secretary of India; 2003 - 2004	Succeeded by Shyam Saran
