= Maharaja Krishna Rasgotra =

Indian diplomat and academic (born 1924)

- Rasgotra in 1973

12th Foreign Secretary of India
- In office 1 May 1982 – 31 January 1985
- Preceded by: Ram Sathe
- Succeeded by: Romesh Bhandari

Personal details
- Born: 11 September 1924 (age 101)
- Education: Punjab University (MA)
- Awards: Padma Bhushan

Maharaja Krishna Rasgotra (born 11 September 1924), often shortened to M. K. Rasgotra, is an Indian diplomat and academic who served as the 12th Foreign Secretary of India from 1 May 1982 to 31 January 1985.

== Early and personal life ==
Rasgotra was born 11 September 1924 in a Dogra Brahmin family which hails originally from Shakargarh, a small town which is now in Pakistan on the border with India, only 30 km from the Kartarpur corridor. However, his family had settled in the service of the Maharaja of Jammu and Kashmir and Rasgotra grew up in the Kashmir Valley. He was the second son out of three sons and two daughters. He received a Master of Arts degree in English from Punjab University.

At an early age, Rasgotra was married to Kadambari Devi in a match arranged by their families in the usual Indian way. Twelve years younger than her husband, Kadambari Devi was barely a teenager at the time of the wedding. The marriage proved entirely harmonious and conventional. The couple had two sons, but one of them died at the age of ten. Kadambari Devi died in April 2018, aged 82, survived by her husband of seven decades, and by her son and his family. The family has lived in the upmarket Vasant Vihar suburb of New Delhi after Rasgotra's retirement from government service in the mid-1980s.

In 2016, at the age of 92, M.K. Rasgotra published his autobiography, which was hailed by former foreign minister Natwar Singh as "one of the best autobiographies by any IFS officer since 1947." In September 2020, it was noted that Rasgotra was still active and was one of the oldest living former Indian Foreign Service (IFS) officers. He celebrated his 100th birthday on 11 September 2024.

== Career ==
=== Early career ===
Rasgotra was tutor at Government College, Lahore from 1944 to 1946, head of the English department at SA College for Women, Sialkot in 1946, and head of the English department at Arya College, Ludhiana in 1947. He was appointed to the Punjab Educational Service in March 1948 and also worked as a lecturer in English at the Satish Chander Dhawan Government College in 1948 and 1949.

He was appointed to the Indian Foreign Service on 27 September 1949 and was confirmed in his appointment on 27 September 1952. Later in his career, he was High Commissioner of India to the United Kingdom and Ambassador to Morocco, Tunisia, the Netherlands, Nepal, France, and UNESCO.

=== Bhopal disaster ===
He was the foreign secretary during the Bhopal disaster. It is claimed by the then-Deputy Chief of Mission of the Embassy of the United States in New Delhi in 1984, in an interview with a news channel, that communications between the government of India and himself relating to the release of Warren Anderson went through the Foreign Secretary. In a subsequent interview with Karan Thapar, Rasgotra held that releasing Warren Anderson was the right thing to do, since he had been earlier promised safe passage.

== Books ==
- A Life in Diplomacy, Viking, 2016; Penguin Books, 2019.

Diplomatic posts
Preceded by Ramchandra Dattatraya Sathe	Ambassador of India to France; 1998 - 2002	Succeeded by Narendra Singh
Preceded by Ram Sathe	Foreign Secretary of India; 1982 - 1985	Succeeded by Romesh Bhandari
Preceded by P. C. Alexander	High Commissioner of India to the United Kingdom; 1988 - 1990	Succeeded by Kuldip Nayar
