= Shyam Saran =

Indian politician

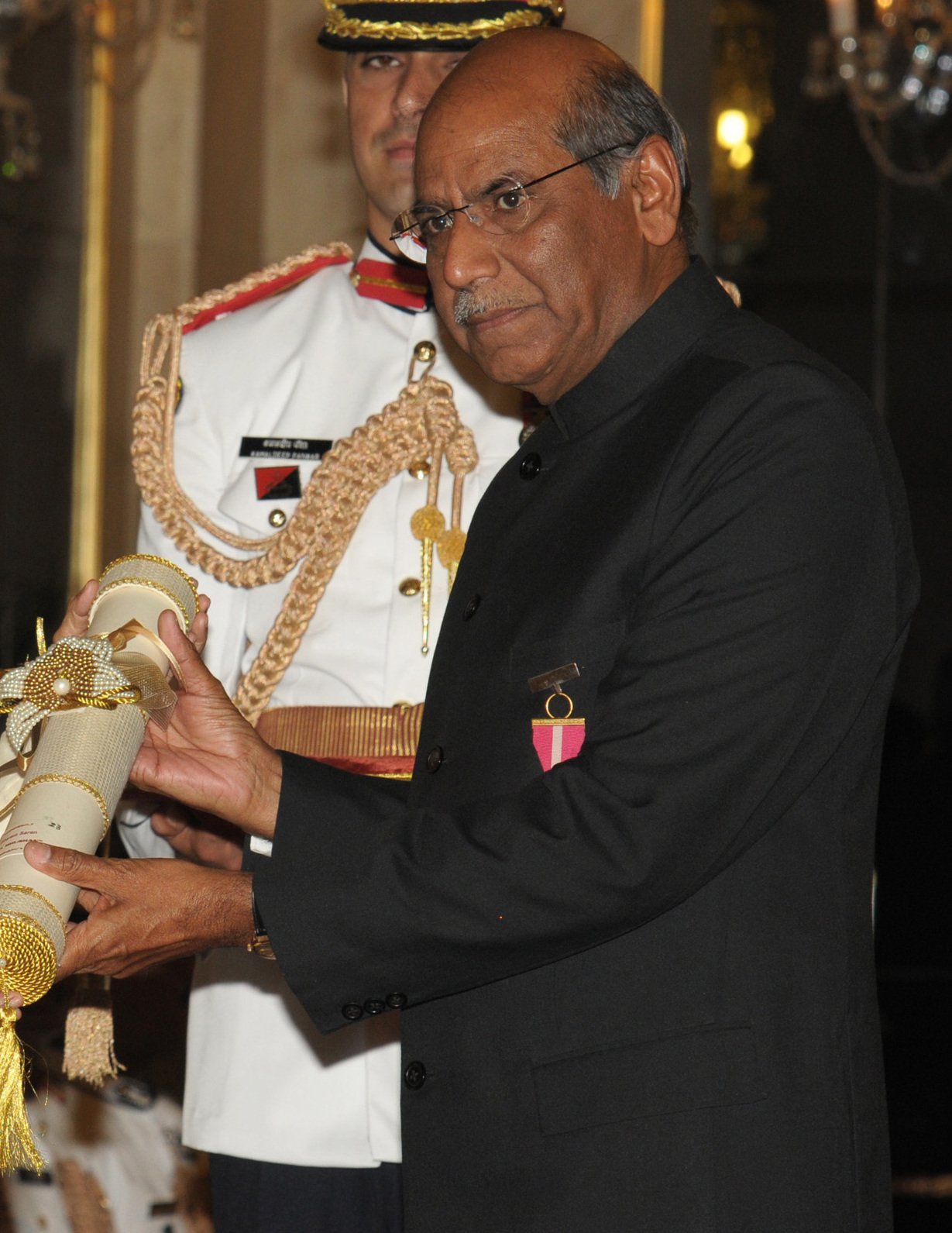
- Shyam Sharan receiving the Padma Bhushan

26th Foreign Secretary of India
- In office 31 July 2004 – 1 September 2006
- Preceded by: Shashank
- Succeeded by: Shivshankar Menon

Personal details
- Born: 4 September 1946 (age 79)

Shyam Saran (born 4 September 1946) is an Indian career diplomat. He joined the Indian Foreign Service in 1970 and rose to become the Foreign Secretary to the Government of India from 2004 to 2006, during the PMship of Manmohan Singh. Prior to his appointment as the Foreign Secretary he served as India's ambassador to Myanmar, Indonesia and Nepal and as its High Commissioner to Mauritius. Upon retiring as the Foreign Secretary, he was appointed the Prime Minister's Special Envoy for Indo-US Civil Nuclear Issues and later as Special Envoy and Chief Negotiator on Climate Change.

Until 2015, Shyam Saran was the Chairman of the National Security Advisory Board under the National Security Council. He also served as the Chairman of Research and Information System for Developing Countries — an autonomous think tank specializing in studies on economic and trade related issues. He regularly comments and speaks on politics and foreign policy issues and is a contributor to multiple magazines and newspapers.

In 2011, in recognition of his contribution to the civil service, he was awarded the Padma Bhushan - third highest civilian honor in India.

== Early career ==
He joined the Indian Foreign Service in 1970 and subsequently served in different capacities in the Indian diplomatic missions in several capitals of the world including Beijing, Tokyo and Geneva. Prior to his appointment as the Foreign Secretary, he was India's Ambassador to Myanmar, Indonesia and Nepal and High Commissioner to Mauritius. In the Ministry of External Affairs, New Delhi, he headed the Economic Division and the Multilateral Economic Division and also headed the East Asia Division which handles relations with China and Japan. As a Joint Secretary in the Prime Minister's Office in 1991/92, he advised the Prime Minister on foreign policy, nuclear and defense related issues. As foreign secretary and later as the special envoy on nuclear issues, he made a significant contribution to the Indo-US nuclear deal.

== Foreign Secretary ==
=== China ===
As foreign secretary, he visited China in March 2005 for the 15th meeting of the India-China Joint Working Group on the boundary issue.

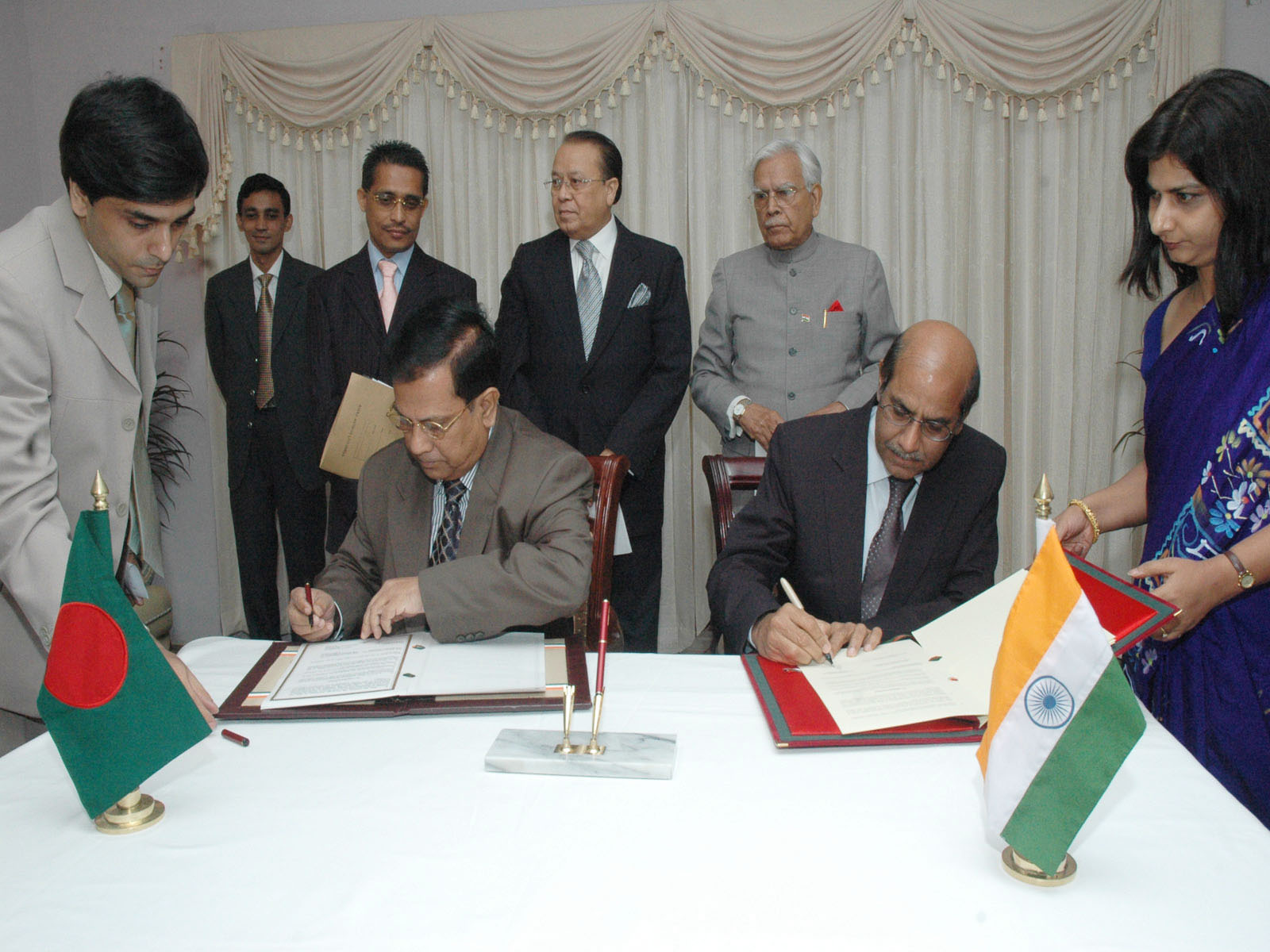
Shyam Saran and the Secretary Ministry of Cultural Affairs of Bangladesh, Shamim Ahsan signing the Cultural Exchange Programme (CEP) for 2005–2008 in Dhaka

=== Stance on nuclear weapons ===
In April 2006, he said that India has no obligation to define its minimum credible nuclear-deterrent after United States Assistant Secretary of State Richard Boucher suggested that India "further define" its minimum deterrent. During his tenure, Saran helped negotiate the U.S.–India Civil Nuclear Agreement. In December 2012, he wrote a research article in which, he pointed out that Pakistan's nuclear arsenal expansion has been extended, this time, not to deter India but to deter possible American attack on Pakistan.

== Later career ==
Even though the Prime Minister's Office was willing to extend his tenure as foreign secretary when he was set to retire in September 2006, Amb. Saran did retire. He was an advisor to the Prime Minister specializing in nuclear issues, as well as the Indian envoy on climate change. He quit office on 19 February 2010. He was the Chairman of the Research and Information System for Developing Countries (RIS) thinktank and a Senior Fellow at the Centre for Policy Research in New Delhi. He is also on the advisory board of World Development Forum, an upcoming forum that aims to bring together citizens' groups, development organizations, businesses and governments, to a common platform to produce, evidence-based politically actionable guidance and unlock greater value, through human enterprise. Additionally, Saran is a Member of the Board of Advisors of the Global Panel Foundation, a respected NGO that works behind the scenes in crisis areas around the world.

== Bibliography ==
=== Essays and reporting ===
- Saran, Shyam (6 October 2014). "Crucible of convergence". India Today. 39 (40): 26–28.

=== Books ===
- How India Sees The World: Kautilya To The 21st Century.

== See also ==
- Navtej Sarna
- Vikas Swarup
- Taranjit Singh Sandhu
- Harsh Vardhan Shringla

Diplomatic posts
Preceded by Shashank	Foreign Secretary of India; 2004 - 2006	Succeeded by Shivshankar Menon
