= Kapil Sibal =

Indian lawyer and politician (born 1948)

Member of Parliament, Rajya Sabha
- Incumbent
- Assumed office 16 June 2016
- Preceded by: Satish Sharma
- Constituency: Uttar Pradesh

Union Minister of Communications and Information Technology, Government of India
- In office 19 January 2012 – 26 May 2014
- Prime Minister: Manmohan Singh
- Preceded by: Manmohan Singh
- Succeeded by: Ravi Shankar Prasad

Union Minister of Human Resource Development, Government of India
- In office 29 May 2009 – 29 October 2012
- Prime Minister: Manmohan Singh
- Preceded by: Arjun Singh
- Succeeded by: Pallam Raju

Union Minister of Science and Technology, Government of India
- In office 23 May 2004 – 22 May 2009
- Prime Minister: Manmohan Singh
- Preceded by: Vijay Goel
- Succeeded by: Pawan Kumar Bansal

Union Minister of Earth Sciences, Government of India
- In office 29 January 2006 – 22 May 2009
- Prime Minister: Manmohan Singh
- Preceded by: Vijay Goel
- Succeeded by: Pawan Kumar Bansal

Union Minister of Law and Justice, Government of India
- In office 11 May 2013 – 26 May 2014
- Prime Minister: Manmohan Singh
- Preceded by: Ashwani Kumar
- Succeeded by: Ravi Shankar Prasad

Member of Parliament, Lok Sabha
- In office 10 May 2004 – 16 May 2014
- Preceded by: Vijay Goel
- Succeeded by: Harsh Vardhan
- Constituency: Chandni Chowk

President of Supreme Court Bar Association
- In office 16 May 2024 – 20 May 2025
- Vice President: Rachna Srivastava
- Previous terms: 1995 – 1998; 2001 – 2002
- Preceded by: Adish Aggarwala
- Succeeded by: Vikas Singh

Personal details
- Born: 8 August 1948 (age 78) Jalandhar, East Punjab, India
- Party: Independent (2022–present)
- Other political affiliations: Indian National Congress (2003–2022)
- Spouses: Nina Sibal (m. 1973; died 2000) Promila Sibal (m. 2005)
- Children: 2
- Parent: Hira Lal Sibal (father)
- Relatives: Kanwal Sibal (brother)
- Education: St. Stephen's College, Delhi (B.A., M.A.); University of Delhi (LL.B.); Harvard Law School (LL.M.)
- Profession: Senior Advocate; Politician

Kapil Sibal (born 8 August 1948) is an Indian lawyer, politician and statesman. A designated Senior Advocate, he served as a Union Minister in the Manmohan Singh government and also as the President of Supreme Court Bar Association (SCBA) from 1995 to 1998, 2001 to 2002, and from 2024 to 2025. He has represented several high-profile cases in the Supreme Court of India, and currently serves as a Member of Parliament, in the Rajya Sabha, representing Uttar Pradesh.

Sibal has practised law in Wall Street and held several important posts relating to law and administration including Additional Solicitor General, and President of Supreme Court Bar Association. Sibal first entered Rajya Sabha in 1998 to represent Bihar. Before that, he had unsuccessfully contested for the Lok Sabha against Sushma Swaraj. He later contested from Chandni Chowk and won in 2004 and 2009.

As an Indian National Congress (INC) member, Sibal served under Prime Minister Manmohan Singh as a minister holding various portfolios during his government. As minister, his actions in an official capacity were controversial multiple times, including when he undertook to regulate internet content. Sibal often was portrayed as an intellectual face of the INC who batted for the party on television and in regular columns.

In the Supreme Court of India, he usually represented the INC. He left the INC in 2022 to file his nomination for the Rajya Sabha as an independent, but was backed by Samajwadi Party.

== Early life and education ==
Sibal was born on 8 August 1948 at Jalandhar in Punjab. His family migrated to India during the partition in 1947. Kapil Sibal's father was Hira Lal Sibal, a renowned advocate. In 1994, H.L. Sibal was named a "Living Legend of the Law" by the International Bar Association and in 2006, the Government of India honoured him with the 'Padma Bhushan' award for his distinguished services in the field of Public Affairs. After his schooling from St. John's High School, Chandigarh, he moved to Delhi in 1964 and joined the St. Stephen's College, Delhi for his B.A. He earned his LL.B. degree from the prestigious Faculty of Law, University of Delhi, and later an M.A. in History from St. Stephen's College, Delhi.

Sibal joined the bar association in 1972. In the year 1973, he qualified for Indian Administrative Service and was offered an appointment. But he declined the offer and decided to set up his own law practice. Afterwards, he attended the Harvard Law School where he enrolled for an LL.M. which he completed in 1977. He was designated as senior lawyer in 1983.

In 1989, he was appointed the Additional Solicitor General of India. In 1994, he appeared in the Parliament as a lawyer and successfully defended V. Ramaswami during impeachment proceedings. The impeachment motion was placed in the assembly for debate and voting on 10 May 1993. Of 401 members present in the assembly that day, there were 196 votes for impeachment and no votes against and 205 abstentions by ruling Congress and its allies. He had served as the President of the Supreme Court Bar association on four occasions, i.e. 1995–1996, 1997–1998 and 2001–2002, 2024-2025.

== Legal career ==
Kapil Sibal joined the Bar association in 1972. He decided to set up his own law practice. He was designated as a Senior Lawyer by the High Court of Delhi on 8 November 1983. He was the Additional Solicitor General of India between 1989 and 1990, as well.

== Political career ==
Over the years, he has held several important positions in the Government of India and the Society, such as: Additional Solicitor General of India (December 1989 – 1990); Member, Board of Management, Indira Gandhi National Open University (1993); President, Supreme Court Bar Association (1995–96, 1997–98 and 2001–2002); Member, Rajya Sabha (July 1998); Member, Executive Council, Institute of Constitutional and Parliamentary Studies (July 2001); Member, Business Advisory Committee (August 2001); Member, Committee on Home Affairs (January 2002); Co-chairman, Indo-US Parliamentary Forum (2002); Member, Board of International AIDS Vaccine Initiative (2002); Member, Programme Board of the Bill & Melinda Gates Foundation's Indian AIDS initiative (2003); Member, Working Group on Arbitrary Detention set up by the Human Rights Commission, Geneva.

=== Member of Parliament, Lok Sabha ===
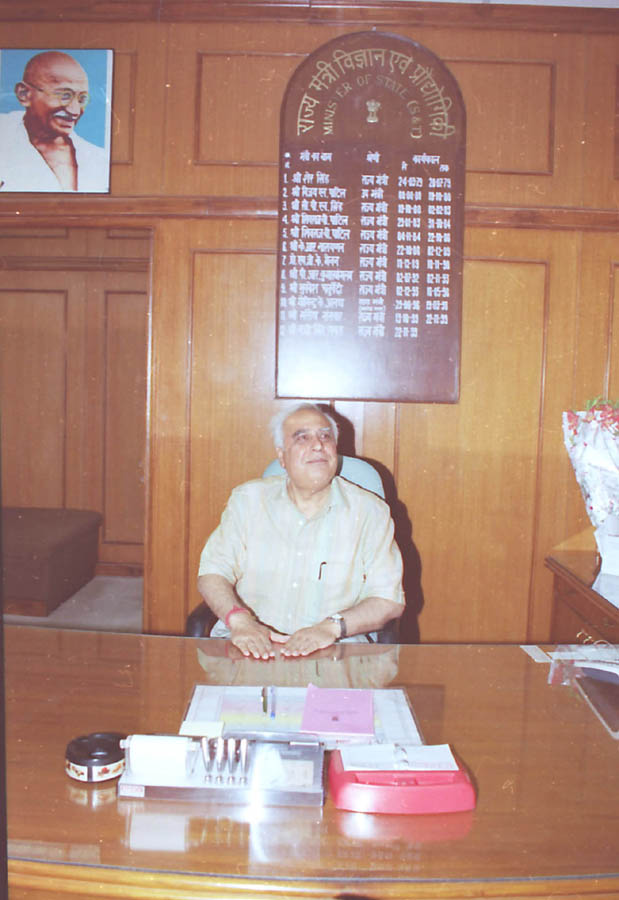
Kapil Sibal takes over the charge of Minister of State (Independent Charge) for Science & Technology in New Delhi 24 May 2004

In the 2004 general elections, Sibal became an MP by winning the Chandni Chowk constituency against TV actor Smriti Irani of the Bharatiya Janata Party (BJP) in the National Capital Territory representing the Congress Party and was inducted into the Cabinet under Prime Minister Manmohan Singh as Union Minister for Science, Technology and Earth Sciences. He won the constituency of Chandni Chowk for the second time for the Indian National Congress in the Lok Sabha elections of 2009.

During his tenure as Telecom Minister his comment about the loss in the 2G spectrum case being only notional and causing "zero loss" created a public outcry and he had to clarify it later. Kapil Sibal was indicted by CAG for favouring M/S Phoenix Rose LLC by overlooking rules and regulations and handpicking that company for creating a database for over 500,000 working professionals of People of Indian Origin settled in the US. CAG's report said that the project's cost was $120,000 but three years after the initiation, the company has dumped the networking site, completing just over 16% of the targeted work.

Also during his time in that office, his move to regulate internet content was criticised across many social networking sites like Facebook, Twitter and Google+.

He represented India in the Annual Meetings of the World Economic Forum in 2005 and 2009 held at Davos, Switzerland. He led the Indian delegation to the Annapolis Conference, USA, held to gather International support for establishment of a Palestinian state and the realisation of Israeli–Palestinian peace during November 2007. He led the Indian delegation to the United Nations Framework Convention on Climate Change (UNFCCC) at Bali in December 2007.

Sibal introduced the Continuous and Comprehensive Evaluation (CCE) system in India for Class IX and Class X and he has also started the changes in the IIT JEE pattern. He has laid the foundation stone for IIT Patna.

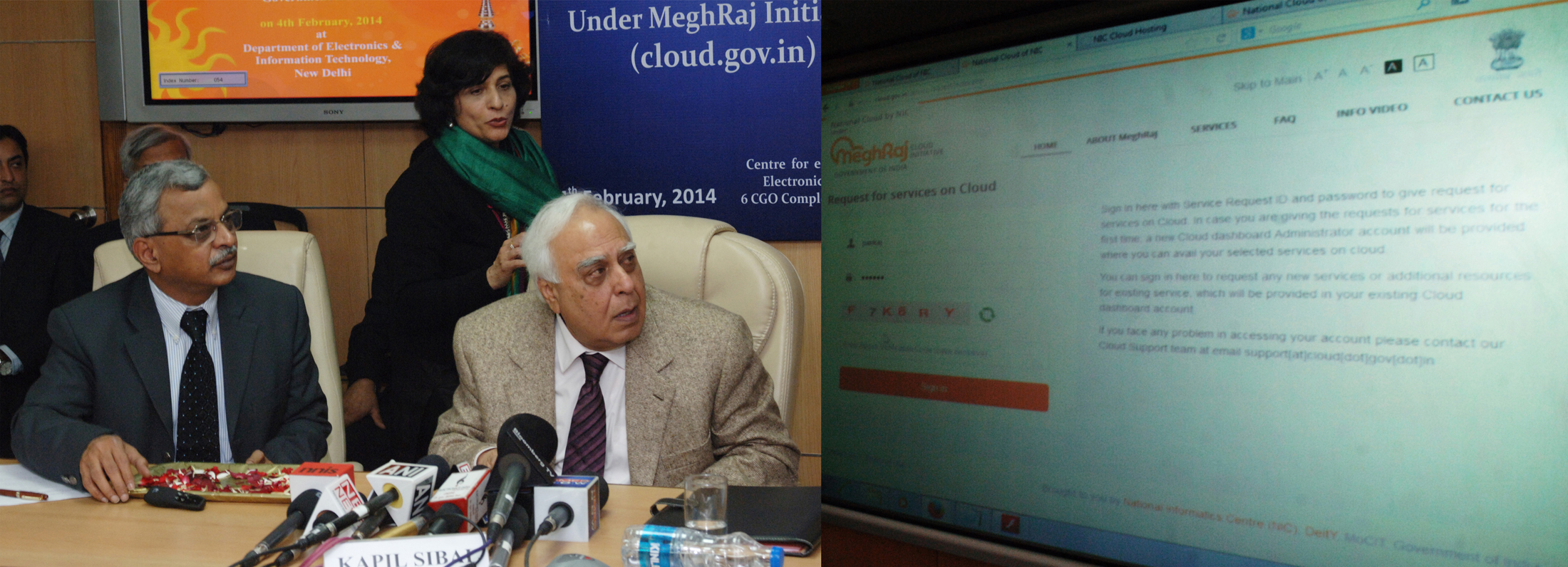
Kapil Sibal inaugurating the ‘National Cloud’ MeghRaj in February 2014

After the 2004 Indian Ocean earthquake and tsunami, Sibal announced that a fresh onslaught of deadly tsunami were likely along the India southern coast and Andaman and Nicobar Islands, even though there was no sign of turbulence in the region. The announcement was a false alarm and the Home Affairs minister withdrew their announcement. Three days after the announcement, Indian National Congress president Sonia Gandhi called Science & Technology minister Kapil Sibal to express her concern about Sibal's 30 December public warning being "hogwash".

=== Member of Parliament, Rajya Sabha ===
Parliamentary Committee assignments

- 13 September 2021 onwards: Member Committee on External Affairs

On 25 May 2022, he filed his nomination for Rajya Sabha elections as an independent candidate with support of Samajwadi Party. Samajwadi Party chief Akhilesh Yadav had accompanied him while he filed his nominations. Subsequently, he broke to the media that he had resigned from the Indian National Congress on 16 May.

== Elections ==
=== Rajya Sabha ===
Position	Party	Constituency	From	To	Tenure	Result
Member of Parliament, Rajya Sabha (1st Term)	INC	Bihar	8 July 1998	13 May 2004	5 years, 310 days	Elected
Member of Parliament, Rajya Sabha (2nd Term)	INC	Uttar Pradesh	5 July 2016	4 July 2022	5 years, 364 days	Elected
Member of Parliament, Rajya Sabha (3rd Term)	Ind	Uttar Pradesh	5 July 2022	4 July 2028	5 years, 365 days	Elected

== Other works ==
In 2011 Sibal also announced a touchscreen tablet computer to be co-developed with private partnership. It was to be available to students for ₹1,500 (US$16). Satish Jha, chairman of OLPC India, the leading competitor to this venture, questioned his claim that a $35 laptop could be created in a year. Five state Chief Ministers endorsed the OLPC initiative and the Chief Minister of Rajasthan himself inaugurated the project on the day Sibal showcased his future laptop. The event was attended by two members of the Union Cabinet. This also lead to an open letter by Nicholas Negroponte offering him complete access to MIT and OLPC technologies to help realise India's dream to create a laptop of its own. The computer was eventually released online as the UbiSlate7C1 tablet PC at ₹4,199 (US$44) and the Ubislate7C+ tablet PC at ₹5,199 (US$54). As of February 2012, Datawind had over 1,400,000 pre-orders, but had only shipped 10,000 units - 0.7% of orders. As of November 2012, many customers who put in orders still had not received their computers and were offered refunds.

== Publications ==
An anthology of Kapil Sibal's poems titled I Witness: Partial Observation was published by Roli Books, New Delhi, in August 2008.

His lyrics were also turned into a studio album by A. R. Rahman titled Raunaq: Conversation of Music and Poetry in 2014.

Kapil Sibal wrote the lyrics of the songs "Tere Bina" and "Mast Hawa" for 2016 Hindi film Shorgul.

== Personal life ==
He married Nina Sibal in 1973, who died of breast cancer in 2000. Amit and Akhil, Sibal's two sons from his first marriage, are both lawyers. In 2005, Sibal married Promila Sibal. His brother is Kanwal Sibal, a retired top diplomat of the Indian Foreign Service, and a former foreign secretary of India.

== Criticisms ==
On 16 May 2017, He was criticized for his comparison of Lord Rama's birth with Triple Talaq while representing the All India Muslim Personal Law Board before the Supreme Court in Shyara Bano v. Union of India case. Sibal argued that triple talaq had been practiced for around 1,400 years and was a matter of religious faith. He made a comparison with the Hindu belief in Lord Rama's birth at Ayodhya, arguing that if Rama's birthplace was a matter of faith then triple talaq should be treated as a matter of faith.

He was criticized over his "ashamed to live in India" remark and his silence on post-poll violence incidents of West Bengal in 2021.

In October 2026, IPS officer Alok Kumar accused Sibal of making factually incorrect submissions before the Supreme Court, disputing the claim that a CBI investigation into the 2019 case phone-tap case remained pending.

Lok Sabha
Preceded by Vijay Goel	Member of Parliament for Chandni Chowk; 2004 – 2014	Succeeded by Harsh Vardhan
Rajya Sabha
Preceded by Satish Sharma	Member of Parliament for Rajya Sabha Uttar Pradesh; 2016 – present	Incumbent
Political offices
Preceded by Vijay Goel	Minister of Science and Technology; 2004–2009	Succeeded by Pawan Kumar Bansal
Preceded by Vijay Goel	Minister of Earth Sciences; 2004–2009	Succeeded by Pawan Kumar Bansal
Preceded by Arjun Singh	Minister of Human Resource Development; 2009–2012	Succeeded by Pallam Raju
Preceded by A. Raja	Minister of Communications and Information Technology; 2011–2014	Succeeded by Ravi Shankar Prasad
Preceded by Ashwani Kumar	Minister of Law and Justice; 2013–2014	Succeeded by Ravi Shankar Prasad
