= Romesh Bhandari =

Indian diplomat and administrator (1928–2013)

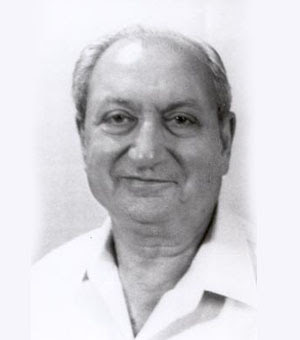

13th Foreign Secretary of India
- In office 1 February 1985 – 31 March 1986
- Prime Minister: Rajiv Gandhi
- Minister: Rajiv Gandhi; Bali Ram Bhagat
- Preceded by: M. K. Rasgotra
- Succeeded by: A. P. Venkateswaran

Eleventh Lieutenant Governor of Delhi
- In office 4 August 1988 – December 1989
- Preceded by: Harkishan Lal Kapoor
- Succeeded by: Arjan Singh

Third Lieutenant Governor of Andaman and Nicobar Islands
- In office December 1989 – 24 February 1990
- Preceded by: Tirath Singh Oberoi
- Succeeded by: Ranjit Singh Dayal

Seventh Governor of Tripura
- In office 15 August 1993 – 15 June 1995
- Preceded by: K. V. Raghunatha Reddy
- Succeeded by: Prof. Siddheswar Prasad

Sixth Governor of Goa
- In office 16 June 1995 – 18 July 1996
- Preceded by: Gopala Ramanujam
- Succeeded by: P.C. Alexander

14th Governor of Uttar Pradesh
- In office 19 July 1996 – 17 March 1998
- Preceded by: Mohammad Shafi Qureshi
- Succeeded by: Mohammad Shafi Qureshi

Personal details
- Born: 29 March 1928 Lahore, Punjab, British India (now in Punjab, Pakistan)
- Died: 7 September 2013 (aged 85) New Delhi, India
- Spouse: Kumudesh Bhandari
- Children: 2
- Parent(s): Amar Nath Bhandari (father); Padma Bhandari (mother)
- Profession: Diplomat; Administrator

Romesh Bhandari (29 March 1928 – 7 September 2013) was an Indian diplomat and administrator. Bhandari, during his career, served in various positions, including as the Foreign Secretary, Lieutenant Governor of Delhi and the Andaman and Nicobar Islands, and Governor of Tripura, Goa and Uttar Pradesh.

== Early life ==
Romesh Bhandari was born in Lahore, Punjab Province, British India (present day Pakistan) on 29 March 1928. He was the son of Amar Nath Bhandari, a Punjab High Court Judge who was part of the bench which decided the Mahatma Gandhi Assassination case. Amar Nath later became the Chief Justice of the Punjab High Court. His mother was Padma Bhandari and he had two siblings.

== Career ==
He joined the Indian Foreign Service (IFS) in 1950 as the Vice-Consul at the consulate in New York. He was minister in the Indian Embassy at Moscow from 1970 to 1971. He was the Indian ambassador to Thailand, Permanent Representative to UN Economic Commission for Asia and the Far East from 1971 to 1974 and the Indian ambassador to Iraq from 1974 to 1976. He then returned to the Ministry of External Affairs as Additional Secretary from February 1977 to July 1979. He was promoted as Secretary on 1 August 1979 and was appointed Foreign Secretary on 1 February 1985. He retired from service on 31 March 1986. In 1984, Bhandari brought back to India the extradited hijackers of the Indian Airlines Flight 421 from Dubai in 1984.

He was the Lieutenant Governor of Delhi from 4 August 1988 to December 1989 and of the Andaman and Nicobar islands from December 1989 to 24 February 1990. He was the Governor of Tripura from 15 August 1993 to 15 June 1995, Governor of Goa from 16 June 1995 to 18 July 1996 and Governor of Uttar Pradesh from 19 July 1996 to 17 March 1998. During his tenure as Governor of Uttar Pradesh, Bhandari's recommendation to dismiss the Kalyan Singh-led Bharatiya Janata Party (BJP) government in the state in 1997 led to a significant crisis for the central government, which ultimately had to reinstate the BJP's state government.

== Personal life and family ==
Bhandari was married to Kumudesh Bhandari, daughter of Maharaja Bhupinder Singh of Patiala. He and Kumudesh had two children, one son and one daughter. Through his wife, Kumudesh, Bhandari's brother-in-law was the businessman Vipin Khanna. Bhandari died on the night of 7 September 2013 after a prolonged illness.

Diplomatic posts
Preceded by Maharaja Krishna Rasgotra	Foreign Secretary of India; 1985 - 1986	Succeeded by A. P. Venkateswaran
