= A. S. P. Ayyar =

Indian writer

A. S. Panchapakesa Ayyar (1899–1963) was an Indian novelist, dramatist, short story writer and judge. He was elected as a fellow of the Royal Society of Literature, London, in 1933.

== Life ==
A. S. P. Ayyar was born on 26 January 1899 at Ayilam, a village near Palghat in Kerala state, to a landlord father. He initially studied at Trivandrum and Madras, and moved to England in 1919 to study at Oxford University, and became a lawyer. In 1933, he was elected as a fellow of the Royal Society of Literature, London. He was appointed the justice of the Madras High Court from 1948–1959.

He married Vedanayaki Ammal in 1919. They had a son, A. P. Venkateswaran (1930–2014), who was a diplomat.

== Works ==
Ayyar had published about 27 works which include novels, plays, short stories, literary criticism, religious works, jurisprudence, travelogue, biography and an autobiography. He had translated several Sanskrit works into English.

Ayyar wrote his novels in the late 1940s and early 1950s. His novels have historical settings. His first novel, A Historical Romance of Ancient India (1930), tells a story of a Gupta king who resisted the Hun invaders during the 6th century. His novel Three Men of Destiny (1039) is a story of Alexander the Great, with two other main characters: Chandragupta Maurya and Chanakya.

He wrote his autobiography under the title Twenty-Five Years a Civilian (1962).
