= Lalit Mansingh =

Former Indian diplomat

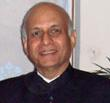

22nd Foreign Secretary of India
- In office 1 December 1999 – 2001
- Preceded by: K. Raghunath
- Succeeded by: Chokila Iyer

Personal details
- Born: 29 April 1941 (age 85) Nandala, Ramalenka Grampanchayat Puri district, Odisha, India
- Spouse: Indira
- Children: Two
- Parent: Mayadhar Mansingh (father)
- Occupation: Civil Servant (Indian Foreign Service)

Lalit Mansingh (born 29 April 1941) is a former Indian diplomat. He was the Foreign Secretary of India from 1999 to 2000, and Indian Ambassador to the United States from 2001 to 2004. Prior to this, he was Indian High Commissioner to the United Kingdom from 1998 to 99. Lalit Mansingh is the son of Odia poet and educationist Mayadhar Mansingh.

== Early life and education ==
Mansingh was born and brought up in Odisha as the middle son of Odia poet Mayadhar Mansingh. He was born at Nandala, Ramalenka Grampanchayat, in Puri district of Odisha. He graduated with a master's degree in Political Science receiving a gold medal for being top of the class. He was a Research scholar and Faculty for short period in American Studies Programme at the School of International Studies in Jawaharlal Nehru University, New Delhi. He was married to Odissi dancer Sonal Mansingh. The couple is now divorced.

== Career ==
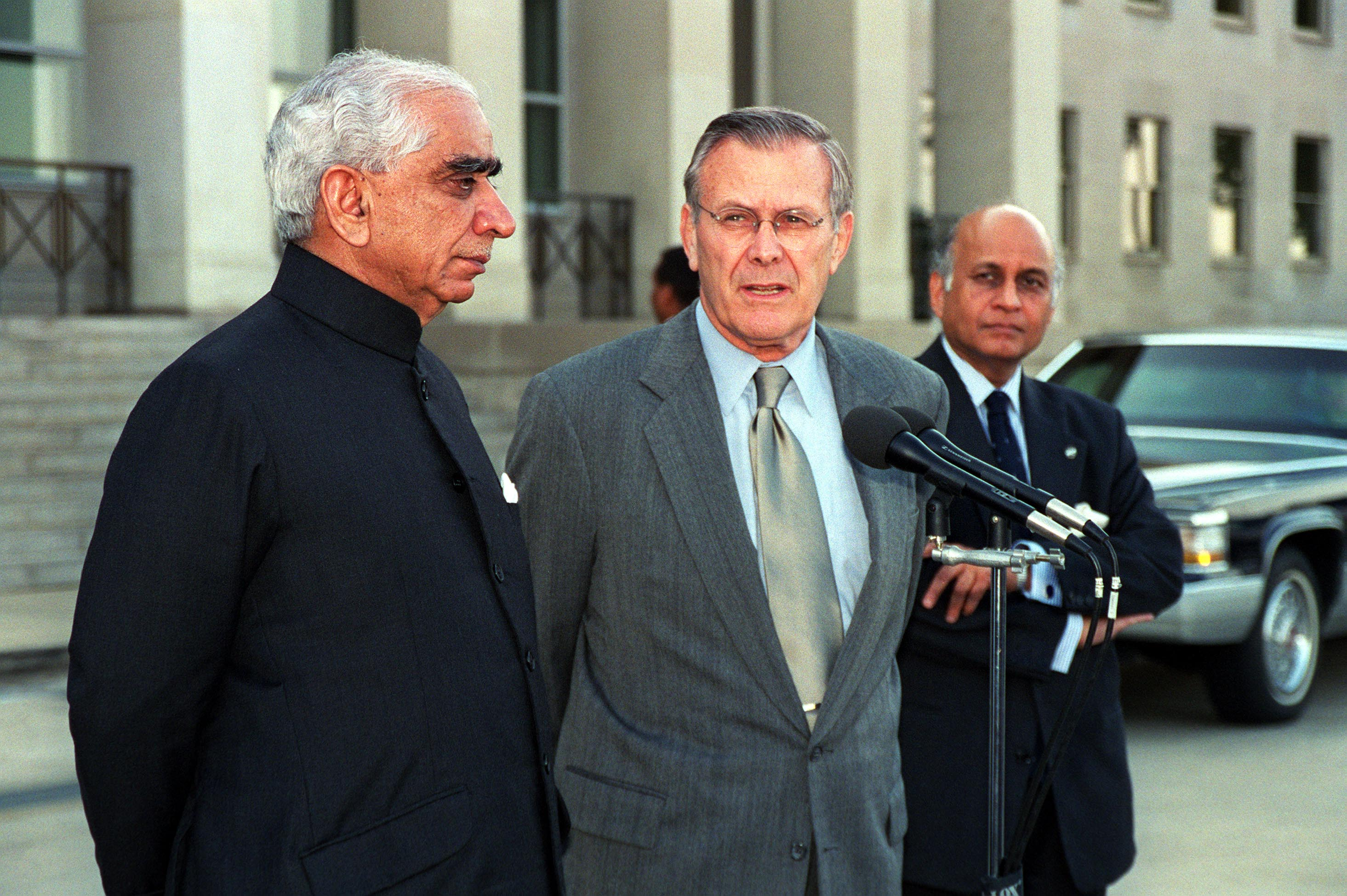
Jaswant Singh, Donald Rumsfeld and Lalit Mansingh

Lalit Mansingh has remained a lecturer in the Post-Graduate Department of Political Science, Utkal University in Bhubaneswar, Odisha. He joined Indian Foreign Service (IFS) officer, in June 1963 and was the topper of his batch. He became High Commissioner to Nigeria (1993–1995) and Ambassador to the United Arab Emirates (1980–83) and in Nigeria with concurrent accreditation to Benin, Chad and The Cameroons. Apart from that he also served in various diplomatic capacities in Geneva, Afghanistan and Belgium.

He was Deputy Chief of Mission in Washington, DC, 1989–1992 and remained the Dean of Foreign Service Institute, India, from 1995 to 1996., apart from serving as Director-General of the Indian Council for Cultural Relations (ICCR), Joint Secretary in the Ministry of Finance and Secretary (West) in the Ministry of External Affairs .

Mansingh is a member of an international group called the Non Official Group of Friends (NGF) of Sri Lanka which aims at assisting that country in its post-conflict reconstruction and reconciliation. He is part of a Track II dialogue between India and Pakistan focusing on confidence building measures between the two nuclear armed neighbors.

Other engagements – Overseas: Member, Board of Trustees, International Crisis Group, Brussels; Member, Asia Pacific Leadership Network, Canberra; Member, International Advisory Council, APCO Worldwide, Washington, D.C., and International Advisory Council Member in APCO Worldwide

In India: Chairman World Cultural Forum India; President, India Strategic Forum, Vice President, Maha Bodhi Society of India; Chairman, Political Science Association, Ravenshaw University; Vice President of the Indian Council for Cultural Relations (ICCR), Prof Emeritus at the Foreign Service Institute of India; Member, Governing Body of Development Alternatives, New Delhi and Gram Vikas, Odisha.

He is also Diplomatic Advisor to the Federation of Indian Chamber of Commerce and Industry (FICCI) and Chairman, FICCI India-US Policy Group.

He was awarded the Kharavela Samman (Kharavela Award) by Odisha Governor in February 2009.

== Speech and transcription ==
- Valedictory address delivered by Ambassador Lalit Mansingh, former Foreign Secretary in a seminar on Tibet in the Aftermath of Devolution of Political Authority at VIF India

== See also ==
- Parikud
- Syed Akbaruddin

Diplomatic posts
Preceded by Salman Haidar	High Commissioner of India to the United Kingdom; 1998 - 1999	Succeeded by Nareshwar Dayal
Preceded by K. Raghunath	Foreign Secretary of India; 1999 - 2001	Succeeded by Chokila Iyer
Preceded by Naresh Chandra	Indian Ambassador to the United States; 2001 - 2004	Succeeded by Ronen Sen
