= Chokila Iyer =

Indian diplomat and civil servant

23rd Indian Foreign Secretary
- In office 14 March 2001 – 29 June 2002
- Preceded by: Lalit Mansingh
- Succeeded by: Kanwal Sibal

Personal details
- Born: Chokila Tshering Darjeeling, West Bengal, India
- Spouse: G. C. Iyer
- Children: 1
- Education: University of North Bengal
- Occupation: Civil Servant (Indian Foreign Service)

Chokila Iyer (née Tshering) is an Indian diplomat and civil servant who served as India's first female foreign secretary from March 2001 to June 2002. She is an Indian Foreign Service officer of the 1964 batch and served as the Ambassador of India to Ireland.

== Post-diplomatic career ==
=== National Commission for Scheduled Areas and Scheduled Tribes ===
Iyer, after retiring from Foreign Secretary post, worked as vice chairperson of National Commission for Scheduled Areas and Scheduled Tribes. Former Chief Justice of India J.S. Verma was heading the commission, which had started functioning in October 2008.

=== News Broadcasting Standards Authority ===
On 19 February 2009 Iyer was appointed the member of the News Broadcasting Standards Authority. The authority was commissioned to implement a code of ethics and broadcasting standards for broadcasts by news channels in the country. She was given the membership, under the "eminent persons" category to set up to enforce the code of ethics and broadcasting standards for news channels.

Diplomatic posts
Preceded by Lalit Mansingh	Foreign Secretary of India; 2001 - 2002	Succeeded by Kanwal Sibal
