= A. P. Venkateswaran =

Indian diplomat

Foreign Secretary of India
- In office 1 April 1986 - 20 January 1987
- Preceded by: Romesh Bhandari
- Succeeded by: K P S Menon Jr.

Personal details
- Born: 2 June 1930 Brahmapur, Odisha, British India
- Died: 2 September 2014 (aged 84) Bangalore, India
- Resting place: Wilson Garden Crematorium, Bangalore
- Spouse: Usha
- Children: Kalpana
- Parent(s): A. S. Panchapakesa Ayyar; Vedanayaki Ammal
- Occupation: Diplomat
- Awards: Fellowship – Harvard University

Ayilam Panchapakesha Venkateswaran (2 August 1930 – 2 September 2014) was an Indian diplomat, former Foreign Secretary of India and former chairman of Asia Centre, Bangalore, rated by many as one of the most efficient foreign secretaries of India. The circumstances in which he resigned from the Indian Foreign Service made news at that time and drew widespread comments in the media.

== Life sketch ==
The summary removal of the Foreign Secretary, A. P. Venkateswaran, in the shabbiest manner imaginable, has...., wrote Inder Malhotra in The Times of India, sent shock waves through the entire edifice of the government, shattered the morale of the bureaucracy and aroused the gravest misgivings about the future patterns of the government in New Delhi

A. P. Venkateswaran comes from a Tamil Brahmin family with roots in a small Palakkadu hamlet of Ayilam, in the south Indian state of Kerala. His father, A. S. Panchapakesa Ayyar was a former Madras High Court judge turned civil servant and Venkateswaran was born at Brahmapur, while his father was staying in Odisha with his mother, Vedanayaki Ammal. Venkateswaran was good at studies and he secured three post graduate degrees in Science, Economics, and Political Science from the Madras Christian College before joining Indian Foreign Service on 2 April 1952, at the age of 22. After joining the service, Venkateswaran continued his studies at Oxford on International Law (1952–53) and at the UCL School of Slavonic and East European Studies, London (1953–54).

Venkateswaran was married to Usha and the couple had a daughter, Kalpana, who is settled in the US. He died on 2 September 2014, at Bangalore, succumbing to a cardiac arrest. His mortal remains were cremated at Wilson Garden Crematorium in the city.

Venkateswaran was a Fellow of the Center for Industrial Affairs at Harvard University from 1974 to 1975. He has also written several articles on international politics in journals and magazines.

== Controversy ==
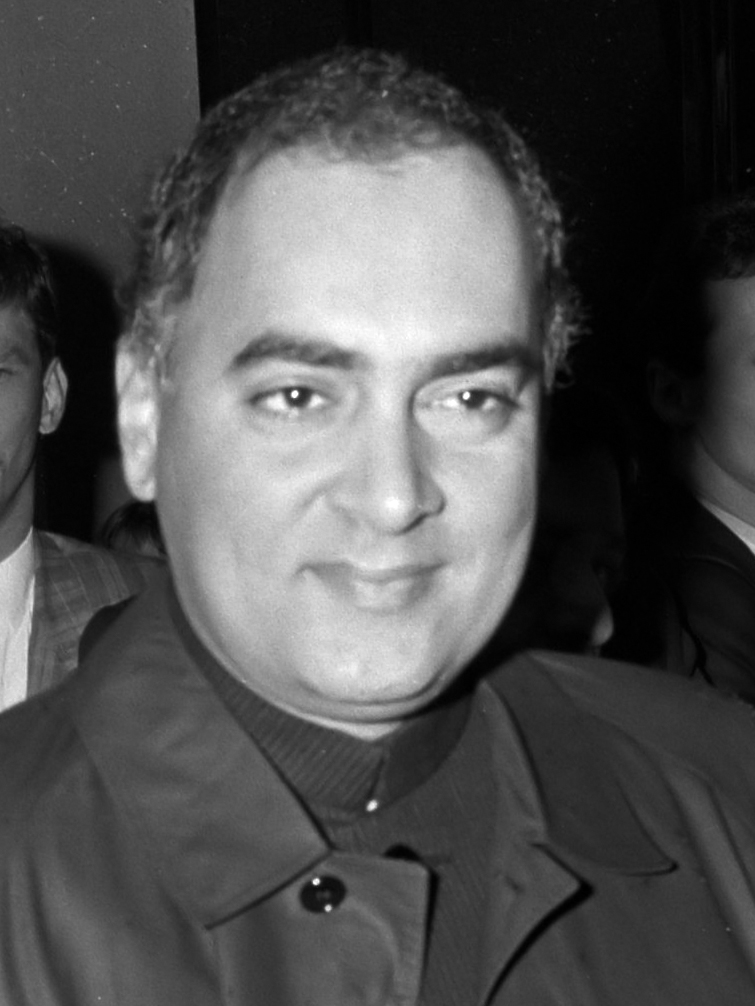
Rajiv Gandhi (1987)

One year after he assumed office as the Foreign Secretary of India, Venkateswaran made a public statement that the Indian Peace Keeping Force operations in Sri Lanka was a mistake, a statement which appeared to have irked Rajiv Gandhi, then Prime Minister of India. Weeks later, when asked by a Pakistani journalist about the impending Pakistan visit for the SAARC summit, announced earlier by Venkateswaran, Rajiv Gandhi replied with the now famous words,

Soon, you will be talking to a new foreign secretary

The declaration generated much publicity and had no precedence where the termination of service of a Class I civil services officer being announced at a press conference. Venkateswaran, present at the press conference, sent the letter of his resignation to the Prime Minister's office immediately. The incident attracted worldwide media interest. Years later, Venkateswaran commented that the decision to send IPKF to Sri Lanka was a mistake which finally led to the assassination of Rajiv Gandhi.

== Positions ==
Venkateswaran has served in the Indian foreign offices across the globe, except in South American continent, and was the Indian Ambassador in the US, China and Syria. After his Embassy stints, he served as the Indian representative in the United Nations before returning to India, in 1986, when he was made the Foreign Secretary of India, the highest job in the Indian Foreign Service, during Rajiv Gandhi's term as the prime minister of India.

Career sketch

Office	Position	Tenure
Embassy in Prague	Officer	1955–1957
New York Consulate	Consul	1957–1959
Embassy – Addis Ababa	Secretary of Legation – First Class	1959–1962
Ministry of External Affairs, New Delhi	Deputy Secretary	1962–1964
Embassy – Moscow	Secretary of Legation – First Class	1964–1967
Consulate – Bonn	Consul	1967–1969
Indian High Commission – Fiji	High Commissioner	1969–1971
Center for Industrial Affairs – Harvard University	Fellow	1974–1975
Embassy – Washington DC	Ambassador (correction: Venkateshwaran was only chargé d'affaires (acting ambassador) in Washington)	1975–1977
Embassy – Damascus	Ambassador	1977–1980
United Nations	Representative	1980–1982
Embassy – Beijing	Ambassador	1982–1986
Government of India	Foreign Secretary	1986–1987

Venkateswaran resigned from Indian Government service in 1987 after which he founded [https://asiacentrebangalore.org/ Asia Centre Bangalore, a think tank of diplomats and intellectuals, based in Bangalore.

== See also ==
- Assassination of Rajiv Gandhi
- Indian Peace Keeping Force

Diplomatic posts
Preceded by Romesh Bhandari	Foreign Secretary of India; 1986 - 1987	Succeeded by K. P. S. Menon Jr.
