= Kanwal Sibal =

Indian diplomat (born 1943)

Padma Shri (Dr.) Kanwal Sibal IFS (Retd.)
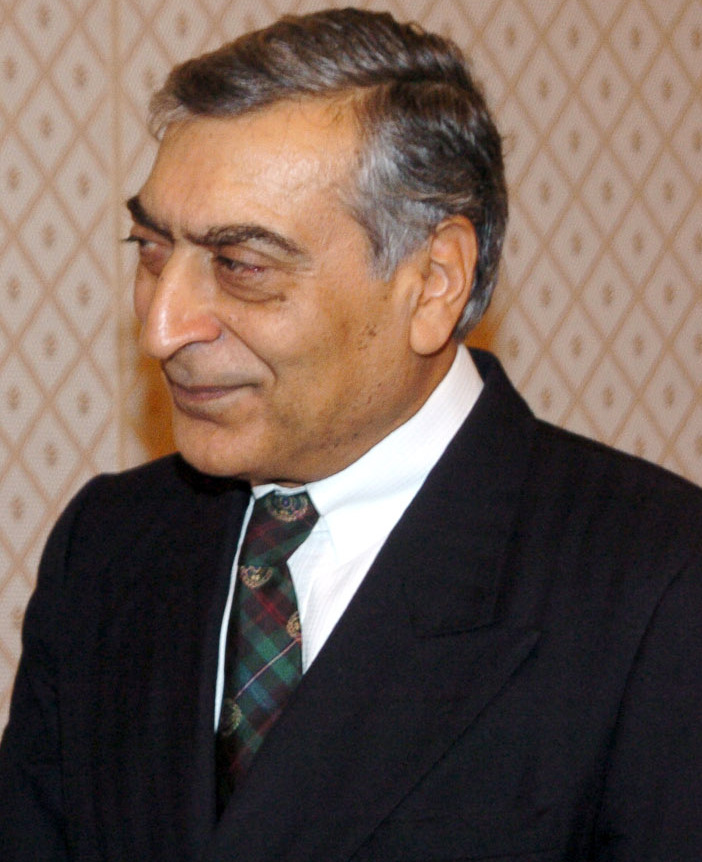

24th Foreign Secretary of India
- In office 29 June 2002 – 19 November 2003
- Prime Minister: Atal Bihari Vajpayee
- Preceded by: Chokila Iyer
- Succeeded by: Shashank

Chancellor of the Jawaharlal Nehru University
- Incumbent
- Assumed office 26 September 2023
- Preceded by: V. K. Saraswat

Personal details
- Born: 18 November 1943 (age 82)
- Occupation: Diplomat

Kanwal Sibal (born 18 November 1943) is a retired diplomat who served as Foreign Secretary of India from 2002 to 2003. The Government of India awarded him the Padma Shri award for his distinguished services in the field of Public Affairs in 2017. Post-retirement, he has been appointed as the Chancellor of Jawaharlal Nehru University since 2023 by the President of India.

== Early life and education ==
He was born on 18 November 1943 to noted Lawyer Hira Lall Sibal, Padma Bhushan awardee.

He graduated with an MA in English from Panjab University. Dr. Kanwal Sibal later graduated from the World Information Distributed University with the scientific degree of International Doctor of Philosophy and the scientific degree of Grand Doctor of Philosophy, in June 2006. Dr. Kanwal Sibal is the First Grand Doctor of Philosophy in India. He received the title of Full Professor from the European Academy of Informatization and the World Information Distributed University-WIDU.

== Diplomatic career ==
He was appointed to the Indian Foreign Service in July 1966.

He served in Paris (August 1968 to July 1973), Dar es Salaam (August 1976 to October 1979), Lisbon (February 1980 to July 1982), and Kathmandu (July 1982 to September 1985). Dr. Sibal also served as Joint Secretary (Administration/West Europe) in the Ministry of External Affairs of the Government of India from January 1986 to April 1989, the Ambassador of India to Turkey (April 1989 to July 1992), the Deputy Chief of Mission, Embassy of India, Washington (August 1992 to September 1995), the Ambassador of India to Egypt (September 1995 to March 1998), the Ambassador of India to France (March 1998 to June 2002) and Ambassador to Russia (2004 to 2007).

=== Oraon abuse case ===
During Sibal's tenure as Ambassador of India to France in 1999, a diplomat at the embassy, Amrit Lugun, was accused by his family's live-in servant, Lalita Oraon, of sexual abuse after she had escaped from Lugun's household. The French media and public was horrified to learn that Oraon had suffered "knife wounds, three to 6cm deep, all around the vagina" and the injuries were "consistent with an act of torture or deliberate mutilation" according to the description of an examining doctor to French media. In the face of pressure on bilateral ties, Sibal continued to support Lugun and refused to remove him pending any probe. When the Ministry of External Affairs attempted to send an Additional Secretary level official for further enquiry, an "enraged" Sibal complained to the Prime Minister's Office and had the investigation cancelled. India Today noted there was a "political colour" to Sibal's actions as his brother Kapil was a "high-profile Congress spokesman and Lugun's mother-in-law Sushila Kerketta a Congress MLA."

== Other posts held ==
He was a member of India's National Security Advisory Board from November 2008 to November 2010.

In 2023, he became the chancellor of Jawaharlal Nehru University.

== Family ==
Kanwal Sibal's father was H.L. Sibal, a renowned advocate who was rendered homeless along with his entire family during partition. In 1994, H.L. Sibal was named a "Living Legend of the Law" by the International Bar Association and in 2006.

Indian National Congress politician and former Cabinet Minister Kapil Sibal is Kanwal's younger brother. Virender Sibal, Jitendar Sibal (both retired IAS officers) and Ms. Asha Nanda are his other siblings.

== See also ==
- Navtej Sarna
- Taranjit Singh Sandhu
- Harsh Vardhan Shringla
- Indian Foreign Service

Diplomatic posts
Preceded by Ranjit Sethi	Ambassador of India to France; 1998 - 2002	Succeeded by Savitri Kunadi
Preceded by Chokila Iyer	Foreign Secretary of India; 2002 - 2003	Succeeded by Shashank
Preceded by K. Raghunath	Ambassador of India to Russia; 2004 - 2007	Succeeded by Prabhat Prakash Shukla
