= Ram Sathe =

Indian politician

Foreign Secretary of India
- In office 19 November 1979 – 30 April 1982
- Preceded by: Jagat Singh Mehta
- Succeeded by: Maharaja Krishna Rasgotra

Ram Chandra Dattatraya Sathe (1923–2008) was Foreign Secretary (India). He served as secretary from 9 November 1979 to 30 April 1982.

He also served as ambassador to China (1966–1968), France (July 1976 to November 1978), Iran (November 1978–1980) and Germany (1982–1984) and was a diplomat in Afghanistan and East Africa. His daughter Mohini, is married to Shivshankar Menon.

Diplomatic posts
Preceded by Jagat Singh Mehta	Foreign Secretary of India; 1979 - 1982	Succeeded by Maharaja Krishna Rasgotra
