= R. G. Sonkawade =

R.G. Sonkawade
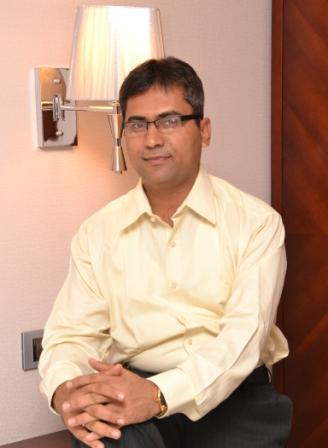
- Occupations: Professor, scientist, writer
- Website: www.sonkawade.com

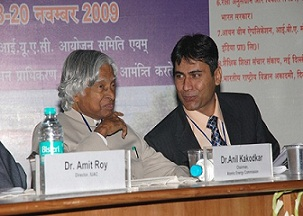
Prof. R. G. Sonkawade with Dr. A.P.J. Kalam (Former President of India) during inauguration of the National Conference on accelerator and low level radiation safety (New Delhi, 18 November 2009)

R. G. Sonkawade is an Indian professor, Department of Physics Shivaji University, Kolhapur, former dean of the School of Physical Sciences and Head of the Department of Applied Physics at Babasaheb Bhimrao Ambedkar University, Lucknow. He has fifteen years of teaching experience for graduate and post graduate students. He has also worked as a scientist at Inter University Accelerator Centre (formerly the Nuclear Science Centre, New Delhi, India). Sonkawade has also worked as medical physicist at the Siddhivinayak Cancer Hospital in Shri, Miraj and the Uddhav Memorial Cancer Hospital in Nasik. He has worked as a visiting scientist at High Energy Accelerator Research Organization (KEK), Japan from June to September 2006. He is also president of Nuclear Track Society of India (NTSI).

== Higher education ==
Sonkawade was awarded the Degree of Doctor of Philosophy from Hemwati Nandan Bahuguna Garhwal University, and completed an M.Sc. in physics with specialization in electronics in the year 1995 at Dr. Babasaheb Ambedkar Marathwada University. He also acquired a Post M.Sc. Diploma in radiological physics (DRP) from the Bhabha Atomic Research Centre.

== Research ==
Sonkawade has worked as principal co-investigator in the Projects of Nuclear Science Centre, at the Inter University Accelerator Centre (UGC Funded University Projects), Department of Science and Technology, in New Delhi.

== Research Publications ==
He has published over fifty research papers in various Journals on topics of Physics, Radiation Protection, radiation physics, radiation dosimetry.

== Recognition and awards ==
- International Atomic Energy Agency (IAEA), Vienna, Austria has awarded him a grant of US$3600 to facilitate the participation at the 10th International Conference on Environmental Remediation and Radioactive Waste Management, which was held at Glasgow, Scotland.
- Visiting Scientist Fellowship from the Japan Society for Promotion of Sciences (JSPS).

== Statutory body membership ==
Prof. Sonkawade is Peer Team Member/Member Co-ordinator of National Assessment and Accreditation Council (NAAC), for universities and colleges assessment in India. He is member of the Board of Management, Finance Committee of the Babasaheb Bhimrao Ambedkar University. He is also member of the Finance Committee, and Scientific Advisory Committee at the Inter University Accelerator Centre for a three-year period from November 2010. He is also a member of various other committees associated to universities, engineering colleges and research institutes.
