= Punjab Ratan =

Punjabi award

Punjab Ratan Award
- Type: State Civilian Honour
- Awarded for: Services of personalities in various fields
- Sponsored by: Government of Punjab
- Location: Punjab
- Reward: ₹1,000000

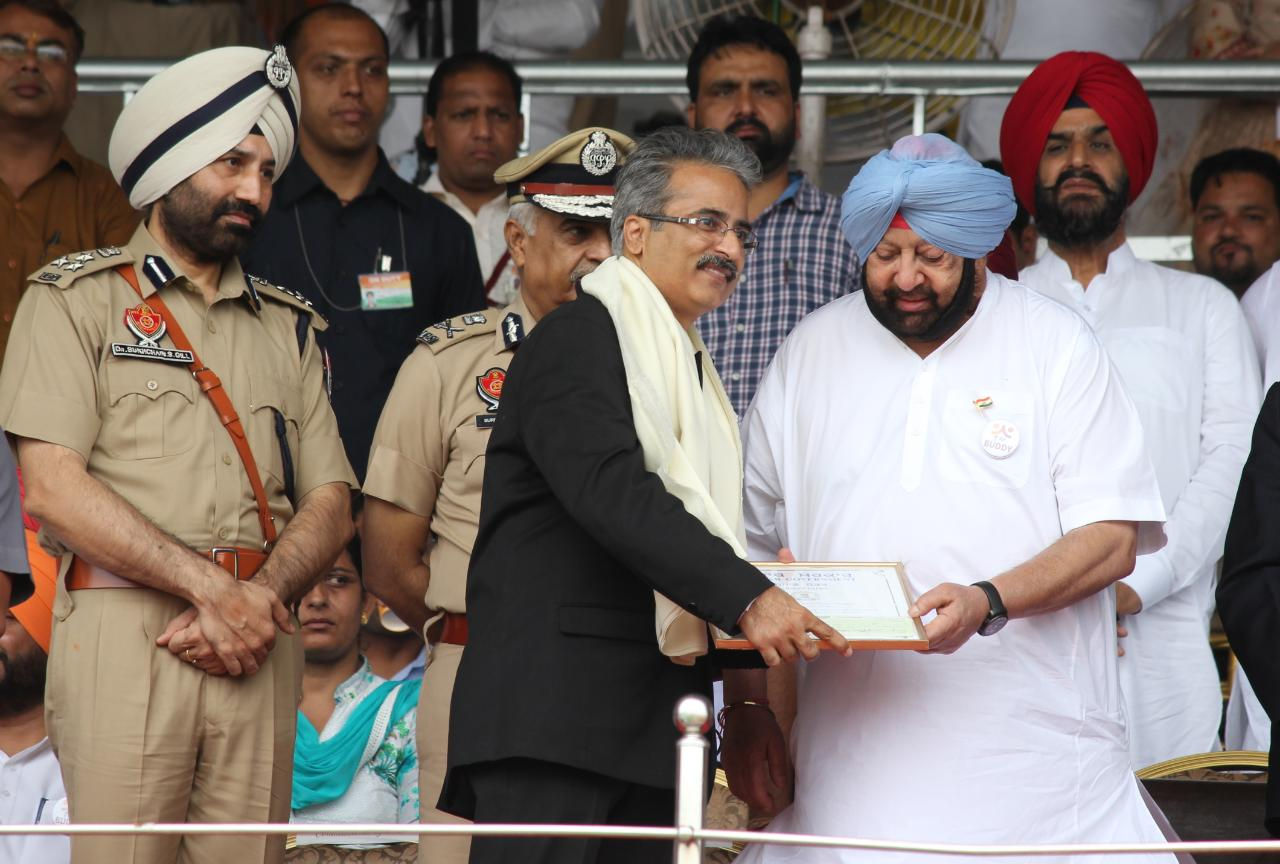
Punjab Chief Minister awards Rajneesh Kapoor with Punjab Rattan during Independence Day Celebrations 2018 at Ludhiana

The Punjab Ratan Award (also spelled Punjab Rattan Award) is an award given by the Government of Punjab for exceptional excellence and achievement in the service of Punjab or at an international level. The award is given to deserving awardees in the field of art, literature, culture, science, technology, and politics. The award consists of the Punjab Rattan Award itself, a Punjabi silver plaque and a Punjab Rattan Award citation. In Punjab, the prestigious award is considered to be as prized and valued as the much sought-after Maharaja Ranjit Singh Award.

== Awardees ==
- Smt. Amrita Pritam
- Khushwant Singh, Writer
- Yash Chopra, Film Director
- S. K. Sama, Endocrinologist and Padma Shri awardee
- Ranbir Chander Sobti, Cell biologist and Padma Shri awardee
- Hira Lal Sibal, Jurist and Padma Bhushan recipient
- Dr Rajneesh Kapoor - Senior Director, Interventional Cardiology, Medanta The Medicity, Gurgaon, India
- Jagjit Singh Dardi, Senior Sikh Journalist, Chairman Chardikla Time TV (year 2000)
- Sardar Anjum, Indian Poet, Famous for Karzdar (year 2001)
