= Satinder Kumar Lambah =

Indian civil servant (1941–2022)

Ambassador of India to Hungary
- In office 1986–1989

High Commissioner of India to Pakistan
- In office 1992–1995

Ambassador of India to Germany
- In office 1995–1998

India's special envoy for Afghanistan
- In office 2001–2002

Prime Minister of India's Special envoy for Afghanistan and Pakistan
- In office 2004–2005

Personal details
- Born: 16 July 1941 Peshawar, British India
- Died: 30 June 2022 (aged 80) New Delhi, India
- Citizenship: India
- Occupation: Diplomat
- Awards: Order of Merit of the Federal Republic of Germany

Satinder Kumar Lambah (16 July 1941 – 30 June 2022), also known as Sati Lambah, was an Indian civil servant of 1964 batch of Indian Foreign Service cadre who served as the Prime Minister of India's Special envoy for Afghanistan and Pakistan between 2005 and 2014. He is also known for building a Strategic partnership agreement with Russia when he was an envoy in Moscow between 1998 and 2001.

Satinder Lambah was honoured with the Order of Merit of the Federal Republic of Germany for promoting Germany–India relations in December 2015.

== Early life ==
He was born in 1941 in Peshawar, British India (present-day in Pakistan).

== Career ==
He joined the Indian Foreign Service in 1964. He spent more than four decades in a diplomatic career, working in several Indian missions worldwide. He has served as the Ambassador of India to Hungary from 1986 to 1989, High Commissioner of India to Pakistan from 1992 to 1995 and Ambassador of India to Germany from 1995 to 1998. From 1989 to 1991, he was the Consul General of India in San Francisco, USA. He has also held the post of India's Deputy High Commissioner (1978–81) and High Commissioner (1992–95) to Pakistan and also served as the Joint Secretary (Pakistan, Afghanistan, Iran).

While serving as the Ambassador of India to Hungary, Satinder K Lambah played an important role in the first export of an Indian car, Maruti to Budapest. In 2001, he played a key role in Indian investments in the Russian oil field Sakhalin-I.

He was appointed the Deputy Secretary-General of the 7th Summit of the Non-Aligned Movement, which was held in New Delhi in March 1983. Later, he was the Coordinator of the Commonwealth Heads of Government Meeting in India. His specialization has been in economic diplomacy and dealing with neighbouring countries of India. He helped in setting up the Indian Embassy in Bangladesh after the Liberation of Bangladesh from Pakistan.

In August 2001, he retired from the Indian Foreign Service. After retirement, Satinder K Lambah chaired a Committee on the Reorganization of the Ministry of External Affairs and India's Missions Abroad. From November 2001 to July 2002, he served as the India's special envoy for Afghanistan. He was the Convener of the National Security Advisory Board (NSAB) Government of India from 2004 to 2005. During 2011–12, he was co-chairman of the Task Force on National Security. In 2011, he was appointed the co-chairman of the Task Force on National Security, where he held office until 2012. In August 2015, he was elected as the chairman of the Ananta Aspen Centre, a not-for-profit think tank.

== Honours ==
- Order of Merit of the Federal Republic of Germany (2015)

== Death ==
He died on 30 June 2022 at the age of 80 in New Delhi.
