= Prabhakar Menon =

Indian diplomat

Prabhakar Menon (born 28 July 1943) is a retired Indian diplomat who served in the Indian Foreign Service for over three decades. His career included ambassadorships to several countries, a key advisory role to Prime Minister P. V. Narasimha Rao, and leadership in international disarmament efforts as the first Chairman of the Executive Council of the Organisation for the Prohibition of Chemical Weapons (OPCW).

== Business career ==
From 1968 to 1973, he was employed in Hong Kong.

From 1974 to 1975 he was Business Officer in Hanoi.

From 1975 to 1980 he was Deputy Secretary of the Ministry of Foreign Affairs (India).

From 1980 to 1982, he was Director (Foreign Secretary’s Office).

== Diplomatic service ==
In 1981 the government of Indira Gandhi asked for another assignment for George Brevard Griffin (1916–2010), counsellor at the US mission in New Delhi, who was already in Calcutta during the Bangladesh Liberation War. In 1981 Prabhakar Menon was appointed an officer at the Indian mission to Washington D. C. but the government of Ronald Reagan did not accept him.

From 1982 to 1985 he was ambassador in East Berlin.

Prabhakar Menon was ambassador to Dakar (Senegal) from 1986 to 1989.

In 1989 he was the ambassador and deputy permanent representative of India to the United Nations.

From 1992 to 1996, Ambassador Prabhakar Menon was advisor on foreign affairs to Prime Minister Shri P. V. Narasimha Rao, while posted as Joint Secretary (Prime Minister’s Office).

Until 1996 he was liaison secretary to P. V. Narasimha Rao.

From 1996 to 1999 he was ambassador in The Hague, permanent representative to the OPCW and chairman of this body.

From 2001 to 2003 he was ambassador in Dublin (Ireland).
