= Non-cirrhotic portal fibrosis =

- Non-cirrhotic portal fibrosis is inherited in an autosomal recessive manner
- Causes: exposure to arsenic, copper or vinyl chloride

Non-cirrhotic portal fibrosis (NCPF) is a chronic liver disease and type of non-cirrhotic portal hypertension (NCPH).

== Presentation ==
It is characterized by 'obliterative portovenopathy', which leads to various problems such as portal hypertension, massive splenomegaly, and variceal bleeding. It is estimated that about 85% of people with NCPF have repeated episodes of variceal bleeding.

== Diagnosis ==
Hallmark of the disease is thrombosis/sclerosis of branches of portal vein. Vessels formed are often termed as mesangiosinusoids or periportal cavernoma.
