= Babasaheb Bhimrao Ambedkar University =

Central university in Lucknow, Uttar Pradesh, India

Babasaheb Bhimrao Ambedkar University, Lucknow
- Seal of the university
- Motto: प्रज्ञा शील करुणा
- Motto in English: Wisdom Modesty Compassion
- Type: Public central university
- Established: 10 January 1996 (30 years ago)
- Accreditation: NAAC A++
- Affiliations: UGC; AIU; PCI; BCI
- Chancellor: Dr. Prakash C. Bartunia
- Vice-Chancellor: Raj Kumar Mittal
- Visitor: President of India
- Faculty: 311
- Students: 4,634
- Undergraduates: 760
- Postgraduates: 3,234
- Doctoral students: 640
- Location: Lucknow, Uttar Pradesh, India; 26°46′18″N 80°55′10″E
- Campus: Urban 250 acres (100 ha)
- Colours: Blue white
- Website: www.bbau.ac.in

Babasaheb Bhimrao Ambedkar University (informally known as BBAU) is a Central University situated in Lucknow, Uttar Pradesh. The university is named after B. R. Ambedkar, social reformer, polymath and the architect of the Indian Constitution. The university was established on 10 January 1996. The university has a satellite campus at Amethi too, which was established in 2016 by Government of India.

== Campus ==
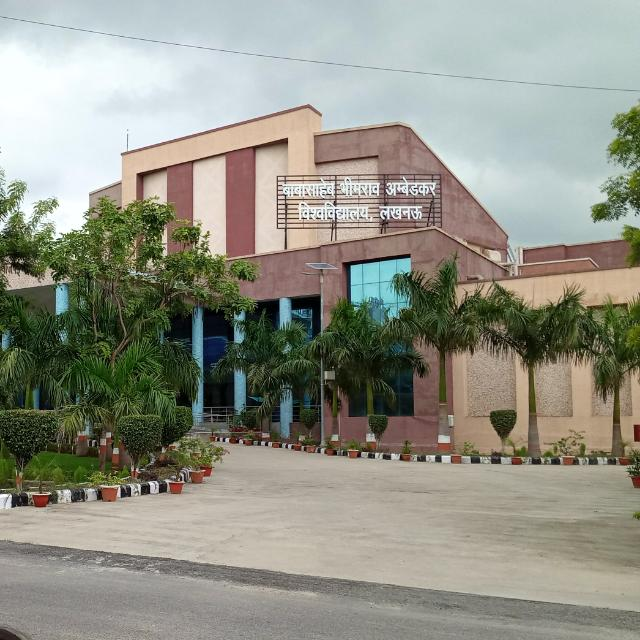
Atal Bihari Vajpayee auditorium

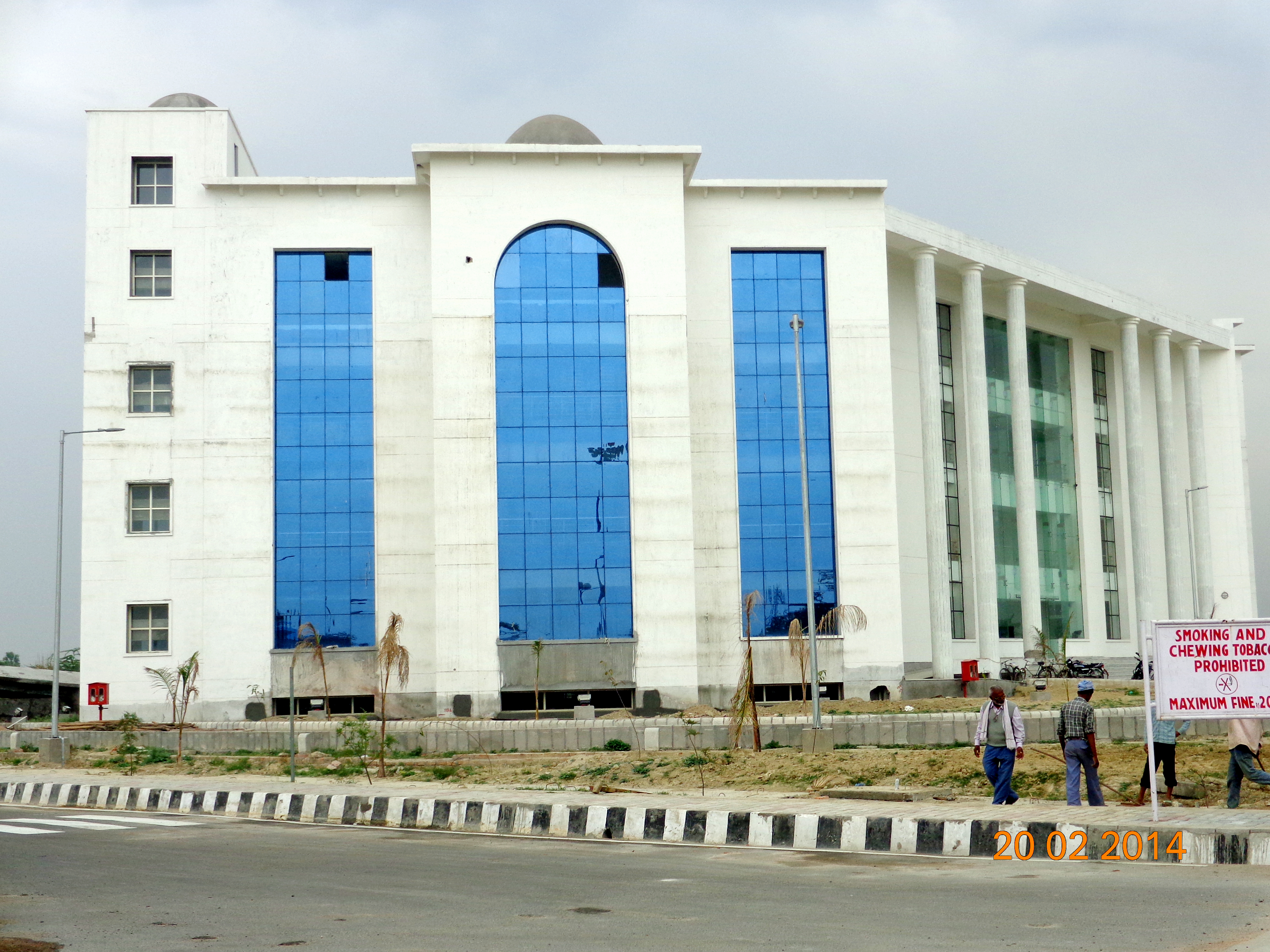
Gautam Buddha Central Library

The campus is spread in the city of Lucknow at Vidya Vihar, Raebareli Road, Lucknow – 226025 (Uttar Pradesh). The main campus is at Lucknow and spread over 250 acres which is eco-friendly environment for focused study. A satellite campus of the university is at Amethi and it runs mostly UG courses. The satellite campus was established in 2016.

== Schools ==
- School of Engineering Technology (UIET)
- School of Information Science Technology
- School of Ambedkar Studies for Social Sciences
- School of Life Sciences
- School of Environmental Science
- School of Education
- School of Home Sciences
- School of Legal Studies
- School of Management Studies
- School of Physical & Decision Sciences
- School of Languages and Literature
- School of Media and Communication
- School of Economics and Commerce
- School of Agriculture Sciences & Technology
- School of Biomedical & Pharmaceutical Sciences

== Gautam Buddha central library ==
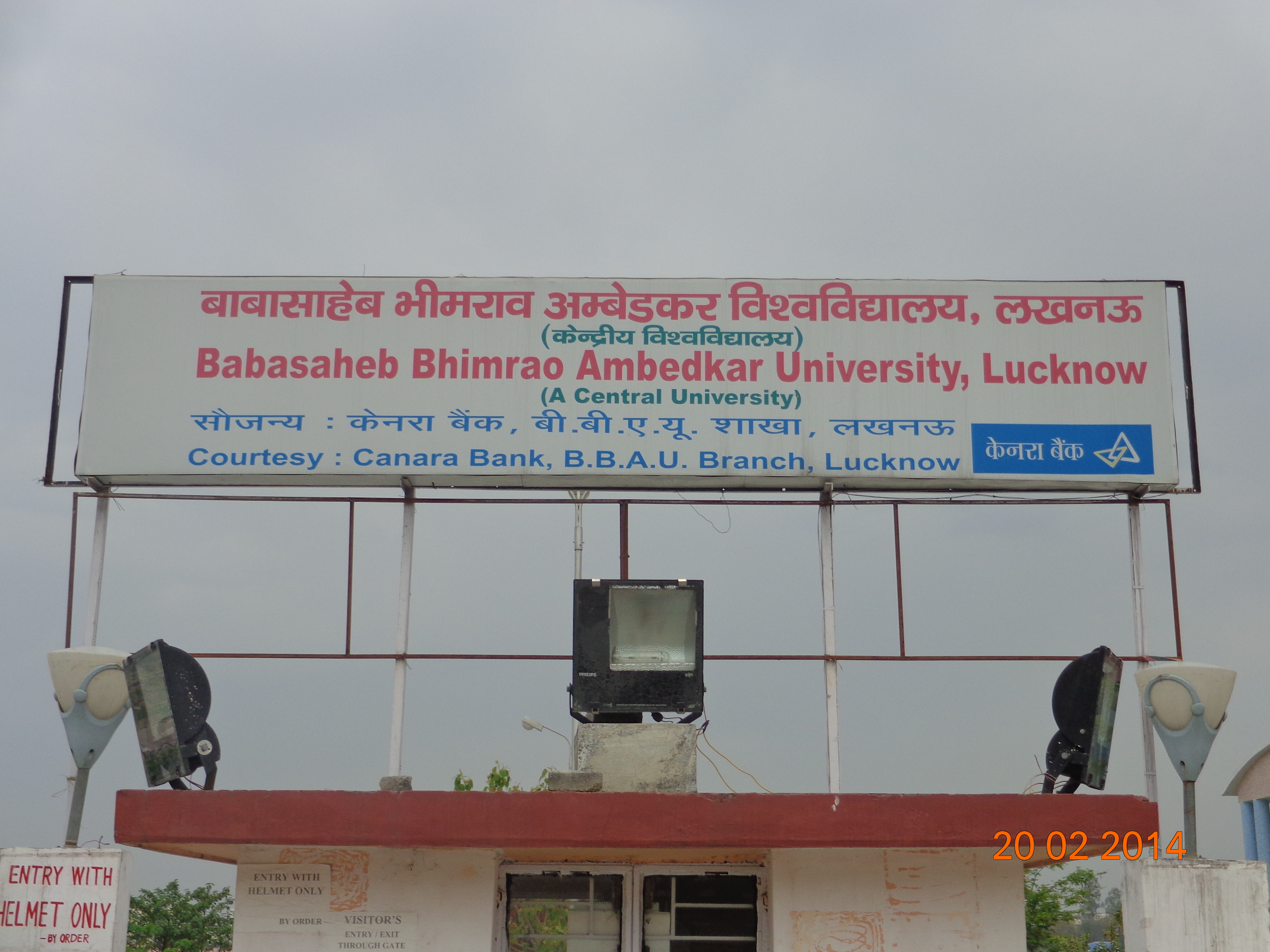
Babasaheb Bhimrao Ambedkar University

The central library was established in January 1998 to promote knowledge and application through its effective dissemination of knowledge and information. The central library of BBAU was named Gautam Buddha central library after Gautam Buddha. The Library is governed by LAC (Library Advisory Committee).

== Ranking ==
University and college rankings

General – international
- QS (Asia) (2024): 651-700

General – India
- NIRF (Overall) (2024): 58
- NIRF (Universities) (2024): 33

Law – India
- NIRF (2024): 10

Business/Management – India
- NIRF (2024): 86

Pharmacy – India
- NIRF (2024): 21

The National Institutional Ranking Framework (NIRF) ranked it as 33rd in the university category. It also ranked it 58th overall, 86th in the management ranking, 21st in pharmacy and 10th in the law rankings of NIRF in 2024.

== Facilities ==
DST-Centre for Policy Research:

The Department of Science and Technology, Govt. of India has granted Babasaheb Bhimrao Ambedkar University, Lucknow a special project to establish the ‘Centre for Policy Research’ with a particular focus on inclusive growth using science, technology and innovation.

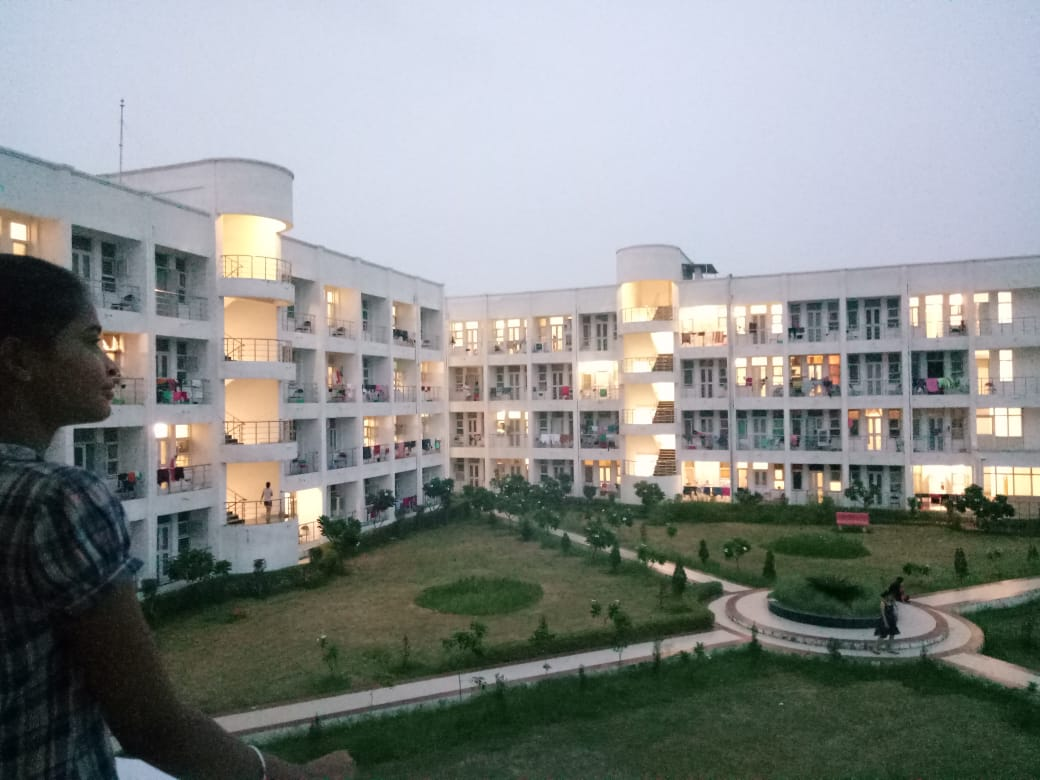
Front view of girls hostel

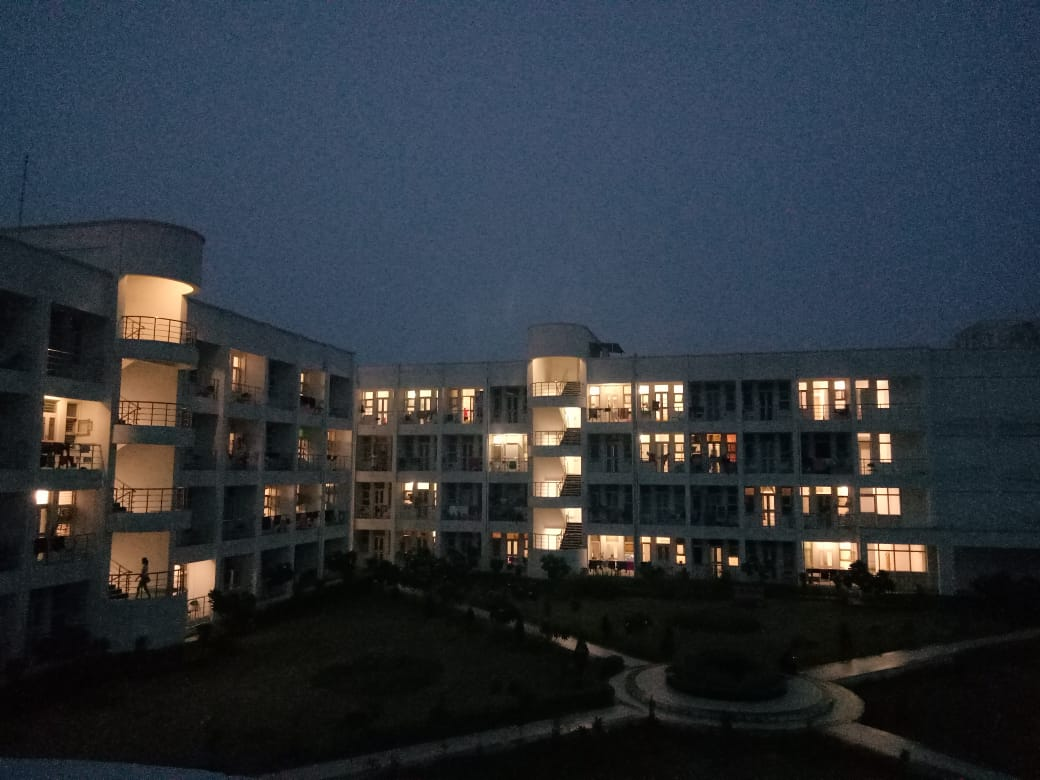
Night view of hostel

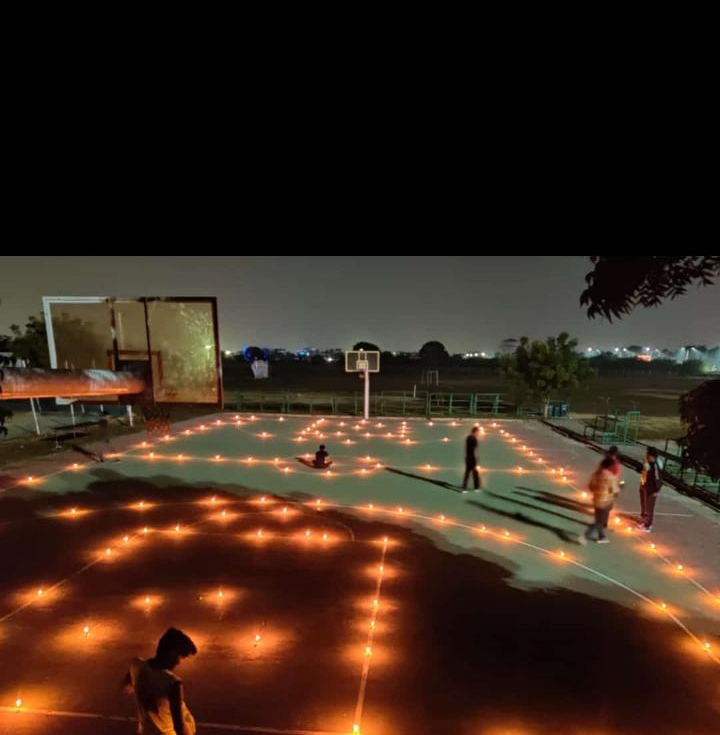
Sports ground of BBAU

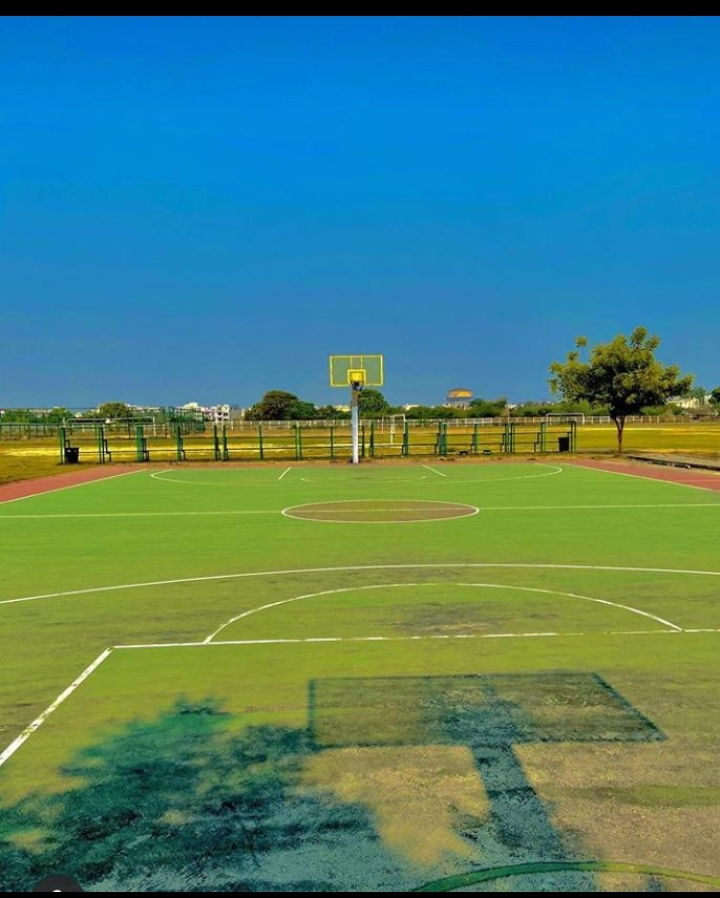
Tennis court

NCC: The NCC is the largest uniformed youth organization. Its motto is 'Unity and Discipline'.

YOUTUBE VIDEO LECTURE: This university also provided YouTube video lecture of their courses.

The university commemorates its Foundation Day on 10 January every year. Lectures by academics on current and general issues followed by Cultural Programme by the university students are the basic features of the celebration. On this occasion, a convocation is always organized.

== Notable people ==
- Ranbir Chander Sobti
- R. G. Sonkawade
