= Foreign Secretary (India) =

Seniormost non-elected official of the Ministry of External Affairs of India

Foreign Secretary of India
- विदेश सचिव
- Emblem of India

- Flag of India

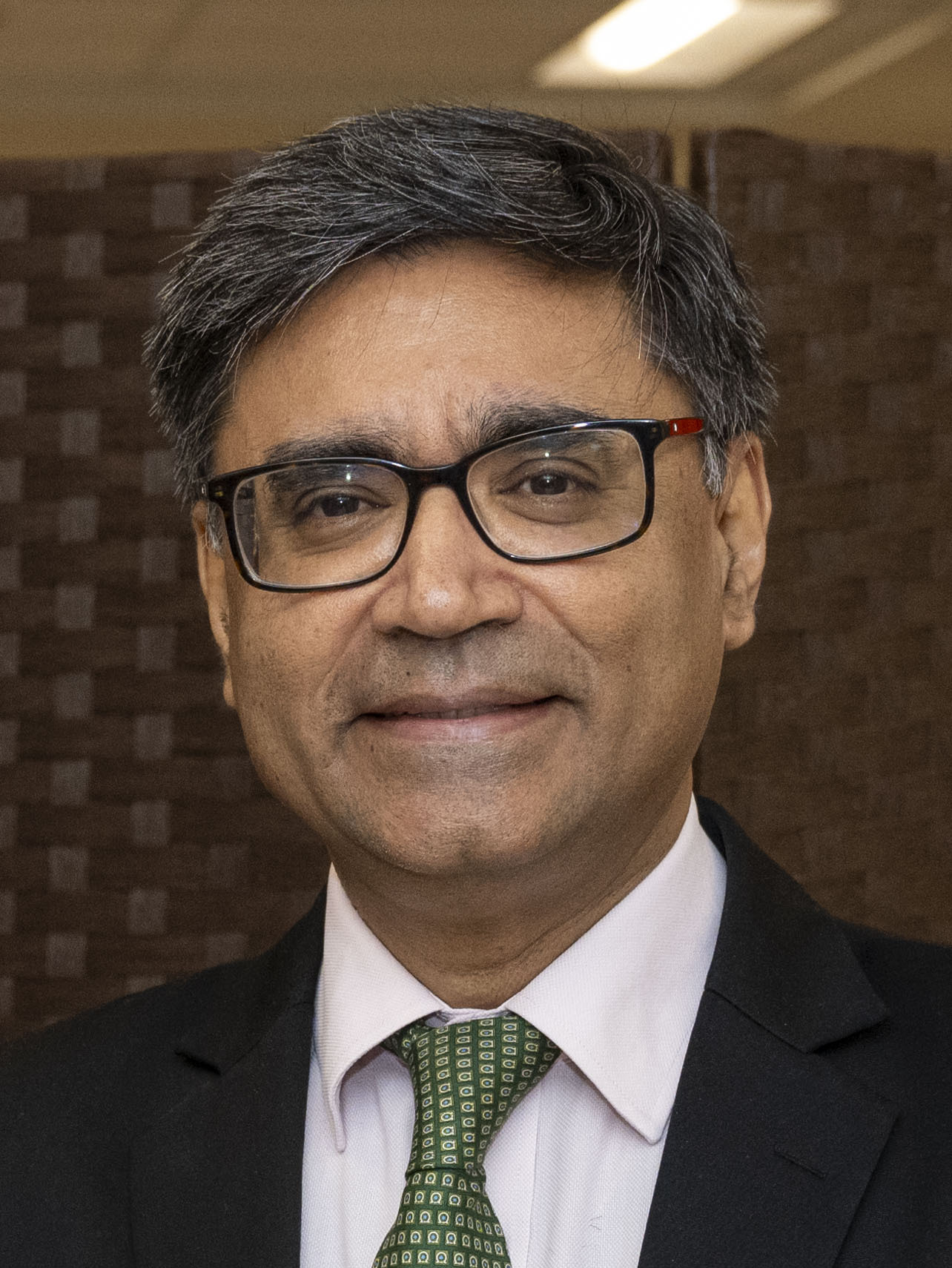
- Incumbent; Vikram Misri, IFS since 15 July 2024
- Ministry of External Affairs
- Reports to: President of India; Parliament of India; Council of Ministers of India; Prime Minister of India; External Affairs Minister of India
- Residence: 3, Circular Road, Chanakyapuri; New Delhi, India
- Appointer: Appointments Committee of the Cabinet
- Term length: Two years, term can be extended.
- Inaugural holder: K. P. S. Menon, ICS
- Formation: 16 April 1948
- Website: Ministry of External Affairs

Foreign Secretary of India (ISO: Vidēś Saciv) is the topmost non-elected official and the administrative head of the Ministry of External Affairs. This post is held by an Indian Foreign Service (IFS) officer of the rank of secretary to the government of India. Vikram Misri is the foreign secretary since July 2024, succeeding Vinay Mohan Kwatra.

As an officer of the rank of secretary to the government of India, the foreign secretary ranks 23rd on the Indian Order of Precedence. However, unlike other secretaries to the government of India, the foreign secretary is also the top diplomat of the country and heads the Foreign Service Board.

Before the post of Foreign Secretary was created, Secretary General of Ministry of External Affairs was the head of Ministry of External Affairs, which was held by Girija Bajpai and N. R. Pillai.

== Powers, responsibilities and postings ==
The foreign secretary is the administrative head of the Ministry of External Affairs, and is the principal adviser to the minister of external affairs on all matters of policy and administration within the ministry.

The role of the foreign secretary is as follows:

- To act as the administrative head of the Ministry of External Affairs. The responsibility in this regard is complete and undivided.
- To act as the chief adviser to the minister of external affairs on all aspects of policy and administrative affairs.
- To represent the Ministry of External Affairs before the Public Accounts Committee of the Parliament of India.
- Recommends postings of officers under the Ministry of External Affairs of the rank of secretary, additional secretary and joint secretary to the Appointments Committee of the Cabinet (ACC).
- To act as the first among equals among the secretaries in the Ministry of External Affairs.

== Emolument, accommodation and perquisites ==
The foreign secretary is eligible for a diplomatic passport. The official earmarked residence of the union foreign secretary is 3, Circular Road, Chanakyapuri, New Delhi.

Foreign secretary monthly pay and allowances
Base Salary as per 7th Pay Commission (Per month)	Pay Matrix Level
₹225,000 (US$2,300)	Pay Level 17

== List of foreign secretaries ==
No.	Name	Photo	Took office	Left office	Minister of External Affairs
1	K. P. S. Menon Sr.		16 April 1948	21 September 1952	Jawaharlal Nehru
2	R. K. Nehru		22 September 1952	10 October 1955	Jawaharlal Nehru
3	Subimal Dutt		11 October 1955	17 January 1961	Jawaharlal Nehru
4	M. J. Ansari		11 April 1961	4 December 1963	Jawaharlal Nehru
5	Y. D. Gundevia		5 December 1963	18 February 1965	Jawaharlal Nehru
5	Y. D. Gundevia		5 December 1963	18 February 1965	Gulzarilal Nanda
5	Y. D. Gundevia		5 December 1963	18 February 1965	Lal Bahadur Shastri
5	Y. D. Gundevia		5 December 1963	18 February 1965	Swaran Singh
6	C. S. Rangarajan		19 February 1965	13 August 1967	Swaran Singh
6	C. S. Rangarajan		19 February 1965	13 August 1967	M. C. Chagla
7	Rajeshwar Dayal		19 August 1967	6 November 1968	Indira Gandhi
8	T. N. Kaul		7 November 1968	3 December 1972	Indira Gandhi
8	T. N. Kaul		7 November 1968	3 December 1972	Dinesh Singh
8	T. N. Kaul		7 November 1968	3 December 1972	Swaran Singh
9	Kewal Singh		4 December 1972	31 March 1976	Swaran Singh
9	Kewal Singh		4 December 1972	31 March 1976	Yashwantrao Chavan
10	J. S. Mehta		1 April 1976	18 November 1979	Yashwantrao Chavan
10	J. S. Mehta		1 April 1976	18 November 1979	Atal Bihari Vajpayee
11	Ram Sathe		19 November 1979	30 April 1982	Shyam Nandan Prasad Mishra
11	Ram Sathe		19 November 1979	30 April 1982	P. V. Narasimha Rao
12	M. K. Rasgotra		1 May 1982	31 January 1985	P. V. Narasimha Rao
12	M. K. Rasgotra		1 May 1982	31 January 1985	Indira Gandhi
12	M. K. Rasgotra		1 May 1982	31 January 1985	Rajiv Gandhi
13	Romesh Bhandari		1 February 1985	31 March 1986	Rajiv Gandhi
13	Romesh Bhandari		1 February 1985	31 March 1986	Bali Ram Bhagat
14	A. P. Venkateswaran		1 April 1986	20 January 1987	Bali Ram Bhagat
14	A. P. Venkateswaran		1 April 1986	20 January 1987	P. Shiv Shankar
14	A. P. Venkateswaran		1 April 1986	20 January 1987	N. D. Tiwari
15	K. P. S. Menon Jr.		January 1987	February 1989	N. D. Tiwari
16	Shilendra Kumar Singh		16 February 1989	19 April 1990	P. V. Narasimha Rao
16	Shilendra Kumar Singh		16 February 1989	19 April 1990	Vishwanath Pratap Singh
16	Shilendra Kumar Singh		16 February 1989	19 April 1990	I. K. Gujral
17	Muchukund Dubey		20 April 1990	30 November 1991	I. K. Gujral
18	J. N. Dixit		1 December 1991	31 January 1994	Madhavsinh Solanki
18	J. N. Dixit		1 December 1991	31 January 1994	P. V. Narasimha Rao
18	J. N. Dixit		1 December 1991	31 January 1994	Dinesh Singh
19	Krishnan Srinivasan		1 February 1994	28 February 1995	Dinesh Singh
19	Krishnan Srinivasan		1 February 1994	28 February 1995	Pranab Mukherjee
20	Salman Haidar		1 March 1995	30 June 1997	Pranab Mukherjee
20	Salman Haidar		1 March 1995	30 June 1997	Sikander Bakht
20	Salman Haidar		1 March 1995	30 June 1997	I. K. Gujral
21	K. Raghunath		1 July 1997	1 December 1999	I. K. Gujral
21	K. Raghunath		1 July 1997	1 December 1999	Atal Bihari Vajpayee
21	K. Raghunath		1 July 1997	1 December 1999	Jaswant Singh
22	Lalit Mansingh		1 December 1999	11 March 2001	Jaswant Singh
23	Chokila Iyer		12 March 2001	29 June 2002	Jaswant Singh
24	Kanwal Sibal		1 July 2002	30 November 2003	Yashwant Sinha
25	Shashank		19 November 2003	31 July 2004	Yashwant Sinha
25	Shashank		19 November 2003	31 July 2004	Natwar Singh
26	Shyam Saran		31 July 2004	1 September 2006	Natwar Singh
26	Shyam Saran		31 July 2004	1 September 2006	Manmohan Singh
27	Shivshankar Menon		1 September 2006	31 July 2009	Manmohan Singh
27	Shivshankar Menon		1 September 2006	31 July 2009	Pranab Mukherjee
27	Shivshankar Menon		1 September 2006	31 July 2009	S. M. Krishna
28	Nirupama Rao		31 July 2009	31 July 2011	S. M. Krishna
29	Ranjan Mathai		1 August 2011	1 August 2013	S. M. Krishna
29	Ranjan Mathai		1 August 2011	1 August 2013	Salman Khurshid
30	Sujatha Singh		1 August 2013	28 January 2015	Salman Khurshid
30	Sujatha Singh		1 August 2013	28 January 2015	Sushma Swaraj
31	S. Jaishankar		28 January 2015	28 January 2018	Sushma Swaraj
32	Vijay Keshav Gokhale		29 January 2018	28 January 2020	Sushma Swaraj
32	Vijay Keshav Gokhale		29 January 2018	28 January 2020	S. Jaishankar
33	Harsh Vardhan Shringla		29 January 2020	30 April 2022	S. Jaishankar
34	Vinay Mohan Kwatra		1 May 2022	14 July 2024	S. Jaishankar
35	Vikram Misri		15 July 2024	Incumbent	S. Jaishankar

== See also ==
- Cabinet Secretary of India
- Secretary of the Research and Analysis Wing
- Defence Secretary of India
- Home Secretary of India
- Finance Secretary of India
- Minister of External Affairs
