= Ayesha Raza Mishra =

Indian actress

- Born: Ayesha Raza; 26 September 1977 (age 49); India
- Occupations: Model; Actress
- Years active: 2003–present
- Spouse: Kumud Mishra (m. 2008)
- Relatives: Ismat Chughtai (grand-aunt); Rashid Jahan (grand-aunt); Begum Khurshid Mirza (grand-aunt); Hajrah Begum (grand-aunt); Uzra Butt (grand-aunt); Zohra Segal (grand-aunt); Kiran Segal (cousin); Khawar Mumtaz (aunt); Samiya Mumtaz (cousin); Salman Haider (cousin); Navina Najat Haidar (niece)

Ayesha Raza Mishra (born 26 September 1977) is an Indian actress.

== Career ==
Ayesha Raza Mishra began her career by working in theatre, advertisements, and television shows. She went on to portray motherly roles in several films including Madaari (2016), Befikre (2016), Toilet – Ek Prem Katha (2017) and Sonu Ke Titu Ki Sweety (2018). She received acclamation for her portrayal of a noisy, comical Punjabi mother in the 2018 film Veere Di Wedding. She went on to play Gunjan Saxena's mother in Gunjan Saxena: The Kargil Girl.

== Personal life ==
Ayesha is married to actor Kumud Mishra. They have a son named Kabir. Her grand aunts include Zohra Sehgal and Uzra Butt.

== Filmography ==
Key
†	Denotes films that have not yet been released

=== Films ===
Year	Title	Role	Notes
2003	Raghu Romeo	Newsreader	
2004	Dhoom	Sunaina	Reporter
2007	Return of Hanuman	Maruti's mother	Animated film; voice role
2008	Mumbai Meri Jaan	Sejal Agarwal	
2010	Thanks Maa	Motwani's wife	
2015	The Exile	Sudha Sharma	Short film
2015	Das Capital Gulamon Ki Rajdhani	Pansokha	
2015	Dil Dhadakne Do	Indu Prem Mehra	
2016	Happy Bhag Jayegi	Rifat Bi	
2016	Befikre	Shyra's mother	
2016	Madaari	Goswami's wife	
2017	Khaane Mein Kya Hai	Mother	Short film
2017	Toilet: Ek Prem Katha	Vidya	
2018	Love per Square Foot	Poonam Tiwari	Netflix film
2018	Sonu Ke Titu Ki Sweety	Manju Sharma	
2018	Veere Di Wedding	Rishabh's mother	
2018	Babbar ka Tabbar	Mrs. Babbar	ZEE5 film
2019	Student of the Year 2	Archana Singh	
2019	Bharat	Jamuna Kumari	
2019	Chappad Phaad Ke	Vaishali Gupchup	
2020	Gunjan Saxena: The Kargil Girl	Kirti Saxena	Netflix film
2020	Ginny Weds Sunny	Shobha Juneja	Netflix film
2020	Laxmii	Ratna Rajput	Disney Plus Hotstar film
2023	Tu Jhoothi Main Makkaar	Mrs. Malhotra	
2025	Aap Jaisa Koi	Kusum Tripathi	Netflix film
2026	Do Deewane Seher Mein	Kusum Shrivastava	
2026	Pati Patni Aur Woh Do	Bua Ji	
2026	Hai Jawani Toh Ishq Hona Hai	Mrs. Ahuja	
2026	Meethe mein kya hai	Amrita	

=== Television ===
Year	Title	Role	Notes
2014	Yudh	Nayantara Sikarwar	
2015	Bang Baaja Baarat	Roli Sharma	
2016	Permanent Roommates	Ila	
2019	Made in Heaven	Renu Gupta	
2021	The Married Woman	Babbo	
2022	Sutliyan	Supriya	
2023	The Freelancer	Sabeen	
2025	Single Papa	Poonam Gehlot	Netflix series
