= Khawar Mumtaz =

Pakistani women's rights activist, feminist author and university professor

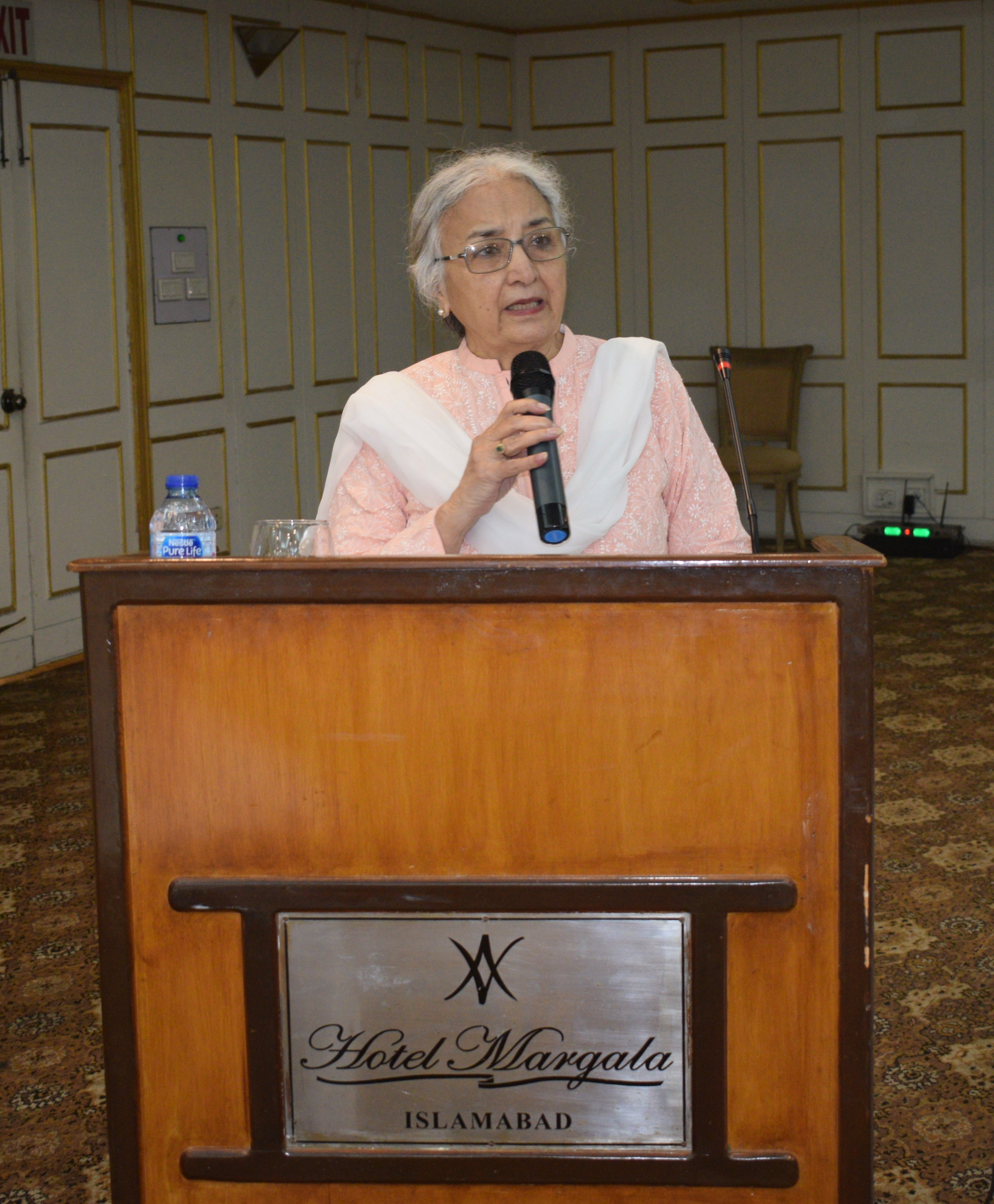
- Born: 29 June 1945 (age 81); Karachi, British India
- Education: M.A. International Relations, University of Karachi
- Occupations: Women's rights activist; Author
- Organizations: Shirkat Gah; Chairperson, National Commission on the Status of Women (2016–2019)
- Children: Samiya Mumtaz (daughter)
- Relatives: Sheikh Abduallah (great-grand-uncle); Waheed Jahan Begum (great-grand-aunt); Ismat Chughtai (great-aunt); Hamida Saiduzzafar (aunt); Rashid Jahan (aunt); Begum Khurshid Mirza (aunt); Zohra Sehgal (aunt); Uzra Butt (aunt); Kiran Segal (niece); Salman Haider (nephew)

Khawar Mumtaz (Urdu: خاور ممتاز; born 29 June 1945) is a Pakistani women's rights activist, feminist author and university professor. She is a former Chairperson of the National Commission on the Status of Women (NCSW) who served for three consecutive terms from 2013 to 2019.

== Family ==
Khawar is married to Kamil Khan Mumtaz, an architect, and they have three children: a daughter Samiya Mumtaz, a prominent actress, and two sons. Her great-aunt was Ismat Chughtai, an Urdu novelist and filmmaker.

== Education ==
Mumtaz was enrolled in St. Joseph's Convent School, Karachi, Pakistan for primary and secondary education. She completed her higher secondary education from St. Joseph's College, and earned a degree of Bachelor of Arts and Master of Arts in International Relations from the University of Karachi, where she topped in the examination. She has a diploma in French language. She was once offered an opportunity to study at the Sorbonne in Paris.

== Career ==
A sense of fairness and sensitivity to discrimination created the spirit and sowed the seeds of activism in her, and she became politically aware during the agitation against General Ayub Khan in the late 1960s. By 1977, a series of repressive laws were enacted, including one that called for the stoning of women accused of adultery to death. She is one of the founders of Women's Action Forum (WAF), which was formed to reject regressive laws introduced by the General Zia -ul-Haq regime, bring women's issues on political and legislative agenda, and to assert women's equal rights in Pakistan.

She initially started teaching at a university, however, she had to leave the job after she was asked to stop her activism in 1983. Mumtaz is one of three females appointed to coordinate the Shirkat Gah, which is a women's rights and development organization engaged in developing research reports, training manuals and advocacy materials, and focuses the issues related to women and environment, women and law, women's reproductive health and rights. She served as the Coordinator and the CEO at Shirkat Gah before joining NCSW as its chairperson. It was the institution that helped develop her understanding, learning and experience.

She brings almost 35 years of experience of teaching and journalism, transnational advocacy and activism, and is specialized in areas such as women's rights and development, women's political participation, poverty and environment, women's reproductive health and rights. Her work spans from capacity building of community-based organizations to research, analysis and evidence-based advocacy with policymakers.

She has over 60 publications to her credit, and her research, writing, and lecturing have focused on women and development, feminism, politics, the economic and environment challenges facing women, and sexual and reproductive health. She has been serving as a member of governing body and board of directors of national and international organizations, including as vice-president of International Union for the Conservation of Nature, and the Society for International Development, ARROW, UNEP International Resource Panel, the Punjab Rural Support Programme, and the PANOS South Asia, and Lead Pakistan. She contributed to the development of Pakistan's national conservation strategy, and represented West Asia on the International Union for Conservation of Nature Council (IUCN). She sits on the board of directors of the International Institute for Sustainable Development (IISD) as well as the editorial panel of the Society for Development's journal, Development. She has served as the member of the International Institute for Sustainable Development (IISD) as well as the editorial panel of the Society for Development's journal, Development, Working Group of Pakistan's Planning Commission on Economy, Poverty and Sustainable Agriculture, and Pakistan Poverty Alleviation Fund (PPAF).

Over the course of her career, she has assumed diverse responsibilities and has got experience serving in universities, organizations, and human rights institutions. She has been the chair of the Senate of Karakoram International University. She has been associated with the women's movement in Pakistan, and has given talks and lectures on several national and international forums on theme relating to women's rights, gender-based violence, women's development and empowerment, and environment challenges that affect women's health.

=== NCSW ===
Under her leadership, NCSW undertook several initiatives that contributed to the implementation of women's rights.

- In November 2019, an agreement was signed with the Higher Education Commission (HEC) to set up a public library and women's museum in Islamabad.
- In July 2018, NCSW's chairperson in collaboration with Election Commission of Pakistan (ECP) established an early warning system in low-turnout areas of women to take action against the responsible by reporting it immediately to ECP to deal with the factors that bar them from voting or from running for office.
- In January 2018, NCSW arranged the launch of an Urdu poetry book written by a domestic worker in order to encourage young women writers.
- In 2006, NCSW conducted a survey on obstacles of women empowerment.
- NCSW worked systematically and defined its priority areas three key dimensions such as; women's economic participation, violence again women, and women's participation in decision making especially elections – that affect women's lives and status from the household to society.
- NCSW has been involved in the drafting of laws related to rape and honor killing, domestic violence, Hindu marriages, elections reforms among others.
- Reviewed Election Act, 2017, and gave recommendations which were incorporated before the passage of the law.
- Monitored Elections 2013 and 2018 using a specially devised checklist to observe women's participation in select constituencies across the country.
- Monitored access to justice through research, and produced a report that highlighted problems in women's access to justice in rape cases under the Women Protection act 2006.
- Produced Women's Economic Empowerment Status Report 2016 and Rural Women Status Report 2018 to be used as benchmarks for tracking progress in these areas.
- Developed standardized indicators on violence against women (VAW) to be used for gathering data.
- Produced Newsletters, NCSW Annual Reports for information and recommendations for policies and advocacy.
- Facilitated Inter-provincial Women Ministers Group for coordination, referrals, and information sharing between provinces on women's issues, laws and policies, and complaints as well as policy briefs for Standing Committees.

==== Controversy and farewell ====
- In 2012, Khawar Mumtaz was finalized out of six shortlisted candidates as a chairperson six months after the NCSW remained headless since the completion of Anis Haroon's term. She served as NCSW's Chairperson for the three-years tenure ended on 31 December 2015. Saira Afzal Tarar served as an acting chairperson for a month.
- In 2016, the parliamentary committee on the Appointment of the Chairperson of NCSW finalized her for the next term, i.e. 2016-2019 out of the three nominations made by Prime Minister and the Leader of the Opposition in the National Assembly. In February 2018, Dr. Farzana Bari challenged the appointment of Khawar Mumtaz by filing a petition in the court, pleading that the government has neither made the appointment of NCSW's chairperson in a transparent manner, nor has fulfilled the due procedures set for this according to NCSW Act, 2012, and her reappointment has violated the fundamental rights of the public at large. The Islamabad High Court (IHC) set aside the appointment of Khawar Mumtaz on grounds that the decision of the selection of the final name by a seven-member committee formulated by then Prime Minister was out of the scope of the NCSW Act, 2012.
- The post of chairperson became vacant after the court set aside the appointment orders of the incumbent NCSW's head for no fault of hers, without questioning her qualifications and ability. Meanwhile, Dr. Huma Qureshi served as acting chairperson for a few months, however, Khawar Mumtaz challenged the decision of the single bench of the IHC, after which the division bench granted stay order to her appeal for restoration as NCSW's chairperson in June 2018.
- She completed her second term in the office that started on 31 October 2016 and ended on 30 October 2019. Several activists and writers including I.A. Rehman, Farhat Ullah Babar, Sherry Rehman, Kishwar Naheed, Samar Minallah, Haris Khalique and others got together to celebrate the successful six years tenure as chairperson at NCSW, where she took several initiatives towards women's empowerment and rights in Pakistan, including developing reports, research studies, and reviewing laws, etc.

== Awards and recognition ==
She received many awards for her contribution to women's empowerment.

- In 1989, she received the Prime Minister's award for her book Women of Pakistan; Two Steps Forward One step Back?, which she co-authored with Farida Shaheed.
- She was one of the 100 nominated for the Nobel Peace Prize in 2005.
- In 2006, she received the Sitara-e-Imtiaz for promotion of women's rights and social service.

== Publications ==
She has contributed to several books and research reports as the author as well as the Editor.

- Women of Pakistan; Two Steps Forward, One step Back?(1987)
- Women's Rights and the Punjab Peasant Movement (2012)
- Informal Economy Budget Analysis Pakistan study (2009)
- Beyond Risk Management: Vulnerability, Social Protection and Citizenship in Pakistan (2008)
- Women, environment, and development (1993)
- Pakistan: Tradition and Change (1996)
- Pakistan Foreign Policy and the Legislature
- Women's Representation, Effectiveness, and Leadership in South Asia
- Land Rights and Soda Giants: Reviewing Coca-Cola's and PepsiCo's Land Assessments in Brazil (2016)
- Pakistan: Tradition and Change (1996) and Diversification of Women's Employment Through Training: Pakistan (1991)
- Women's Economic Participation in Pakistan: A Status Report
- Diversification of Women's Employment Through Training: Pakistan (1991)
- Age of Marriage: A Position Paper
