= Uzra Butt =

Pakistani actress

- Born: Uzra Mumtaz; 22 May 1917; Rampur, Rampur State, British India
- Died: 31 May 2010 (aged 93); Lahore, Punjab, Pakistan
- Other name: Uzra Begum
- Education: Lady Irwin College–Delhi University
- Occupations: Actress; Stage actress; Dancer
- Years active: 1937–2008
- Spouse: Hameed Butt
- Children: 3
- Relatives: Hajrah Begum (sister); Zohra Sehgal (sister); Amna Begum Mumtaz (sister); Khawar Mumtaz (niece); Salman Haidar (nephew); Kiran Segal (niece); Samiya Mumtaz (grand-niece); Hamida Saiduzzafar (cousin); Ismat Chughtai (cousin); Begum Khurshid Mirza (cousin); Rashid Jahan (cousin); Sheikh Abdullah (uncle); Waheed Jahan Begum (aunt); See Mumtazullah Khan family

Uzra Butt nee Mumtaz (22 May 1917 – 31 May 2010) was a theatre personality of the Indian subcontinent, who moved to Pakistan in 1964. She was the sister of theatre and Bollywood film actress Zohra Sehgal, who, unlike her, lived in India.

Starting in 1937, breaking traditional barriers, she and her sister joined Uday Shankar ballet company as actors and dancers and toured through Europe and the United States. When World War II ended their tour, she joined IPTA and subsequently remained the leading lady with Prithvi Theatre in the 1940s and 1950s.

== Early life ==
She was born as Uzra Mumtaz in Rampur, India in a land-owning Muslim family of Mumtazullah Khan and Natiqua Begum, belonging to Rohilla Pathans of Rampur, Uttar Pradesh.

== Career ==
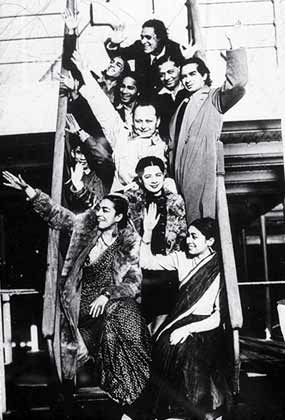
Zohra Sehgal and Uzra Butt, part of the Uday Shankar Ballet Troupe, ca (1935–37).

She began her stage career with Uday Shankar's ballet company in 1937 and went on to become the leading lady of the Prithvi Theatre in the 1940s and 50s.

She entered Uday Shankar's ballet troupe as a dancer and also taught dance before joining the Indian People's Theatre Association (IPTA) in 1944 as an actress. Here Khwaja Ahmad Abbas cast her as the lead in the play Zubeda. Prithivi Raj Kapoor was impressed by her role and chose her as his lead heroine, Zohra too joined her. In the coming years, she played leading lady opposite Prithviraj Kapoor in Prithvi Theatre productions. She played a heroine's part in Sakuntala in 1944, partnering her sister in Ghaddar in 1948 and taking the lead role in Kisan and performed in 100 towns and cities all over India. Uzra Butt was also an art director of Prithvi theatre and worked for Prithvi theatre, until 1960, when it closed.

In 1964 she migrated to Pakistan with her husband, Hameed Butt. Here she formed a dance troupe in Rawalpindi, acted on stage and television from time to time and served the Pakistan National Council of the Arts.

Later she moved to Lahore and joined the Ajoka Theatre in October 1985. Her inaugural group performance was 'Chaak Chakkar' and she went on to act in the plays: Barri, Dukhini, Dukh Darya, Takey Da Tamasha, Talismati Tata, Teesri Dastak, Kali Ghata, Adhuri and Surak Gulaban Da Mousam. She assumed the leadership role of chairperson of the group. She resumed acting after a forty-year hiatus in 1993 when she performed in Aik Thi Nani with her sister Zohra Sehgal. They played the lead roles and the cast included their grandniece, Samiya Mumtaz and niece, Salima Raza. The play opened in Lahore in 2003 and toured India, Pakistan and Britain, including a performance at the Prithvi theatre in 2004. Uzra was presented the Sangeet Natak Akademi Award in Acting (Urdu) in 1994 by the Sangeet Natak Akademi, India's National Academy of Music, Dance & Drama; it is India's highest recognition that is presented to practicing artists.

Her last stage performance was in 2008 after that she retired and would give interviews.

== Personal life ==
She married Hameed Butt a writer and singer with him she had three children.

== Death ==
She died in Lahore, Pakistan at age 93.

== Filmography ==
=== Television series ===
Year	Title	Role	Network
1977	Rishty Aur Rastay	Begum Sahiba	PTV
1989	Neelay Hath	Mai Jee	PTV
1995	Zard Dopehar	Dadi	PTV
1999	Bulandi	Dadi Ma	PTV

=== Film ===
Year	Film	Language
1957	Paisa	Hindi

== Awards and recognition ==
Year	Award	Category	Result	Title	Ref.
1994	Sangeet Natak Akademi Award	Best Actress	Won	Sangeet Natak Akademi	
