= Kiran Segal =

Indian classical dancer

- Born: 1944 (age 81–82); Bombay, Bombay Presidency, British India
- Occupation: Classical dancer
- Known for: Odissi
- Parent: Zohra Sehgal (mother)
- Relatives: Ismat Chughtai (great aunt); Uzra Butt (aunt); Rashid Jahan (aunt); Begum Khurshid Mirza (aunt); Khawar Mumtaz (aunt); Samiya Mumtaz (cousin); Salman Haider (cousin); Sheikh Abdullah (great-grand-uncle); Waheed Jahan Begum (great-grand-aunt); See Mumtazullah Khan family

Kiran Segal is an Indian classical dancer known for her proficiency in Odissi, a classical dance form from the state of Odisha in eastern part of India. She is the daughter of actor Zohra Segal, a 1998 winner of Padma Shri award and has written a book, Zohra Segal - Fatty, on her mother. A disciple of M. K. Saroja, Segal has performed at various stages around the world. She was honored by the Government of India, in 2002, with the fourth highest Indian civilian award of Padma Shri.

== See also ==
- Odissi
- Zohra Segal
