= Salman Haidar =

Indian diplomat

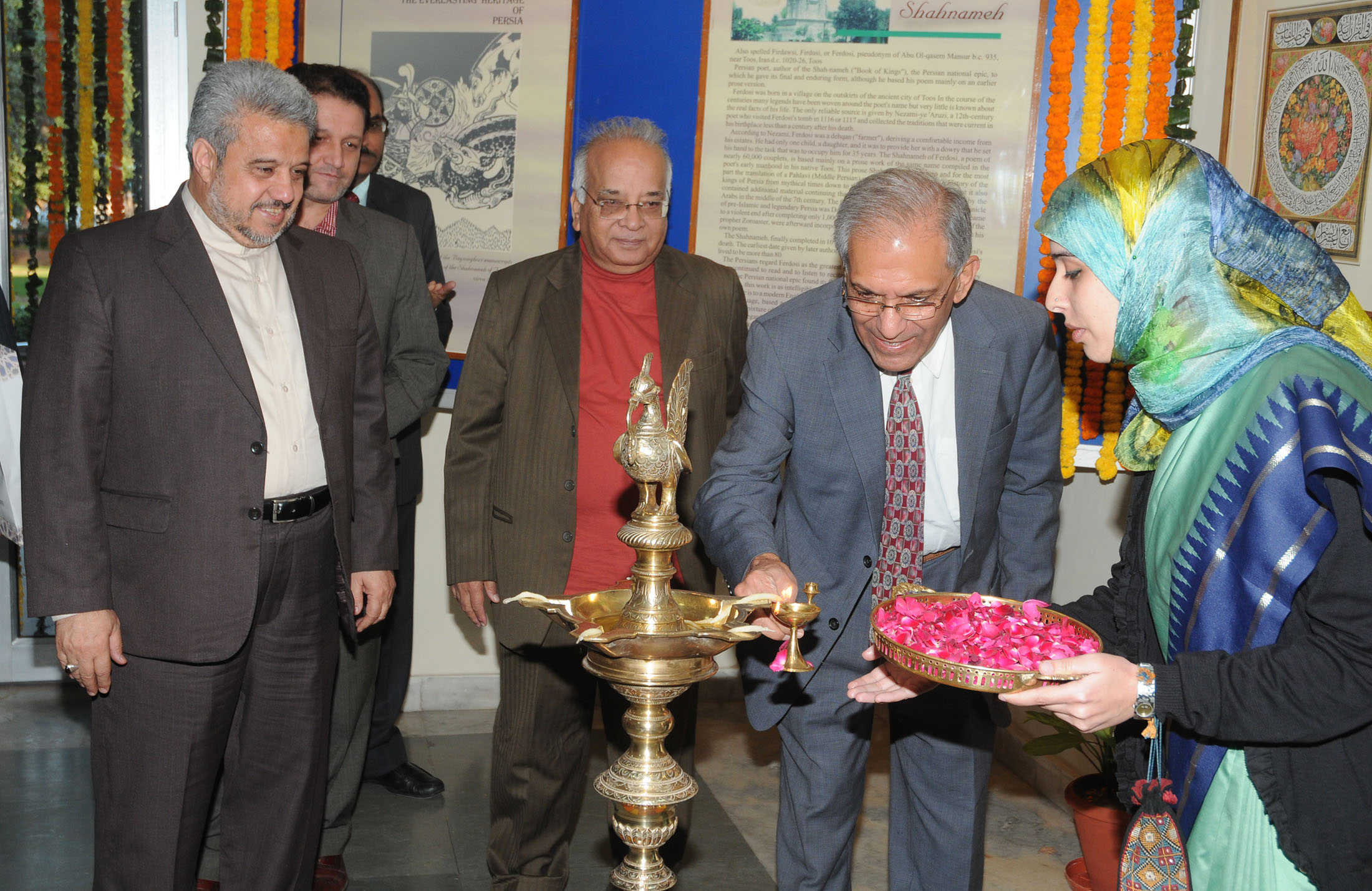
- Ambassador Haider is lighting the lamp

20th Indian Foreign Secretary
- In office 1 March 1995 – 30 June 1997
- Preceded by: Krishnan Srinivasan
- Succeeded by: K. Raghunath

Personal details
- Born: 1937 (age 88–89) Madras, India
- Spouse: Kusum
- Relations: Sheikh Abdullah (grandfather); Waheed Jahan Begum (grandmother); Ismat Chughtai (aunt); Rashid Jahan (aunt); Begum Khurshid Mirza (aunt); Zohra Sehgal (aunt); Uzra Butt (aunt); Kiran Segal (cousin); Khawar Mumtaz (grand-aunt); Samiya Mumtaz (grand-cousin); Ayesha Raza Mishra (cousin); Subramanian Swamy (co father in law); Bernard Haykel (son in law)
- Children: Nadeem Haidar and Navina Najat Haidar
- Occupation: Diplomat and scholar

Salman Haidar is a former Indian diplomat who served as the Foreign Secretary of India. His tenure was from 1 March 1995 to 30 June 1997. He also served as high commissioner of India to the United Kingdom from January to July, 1998.

== Personal life ==
Haidar graduated from Sherwood College, Nainital, St. Stephen’s College, Delhi and Cambridge University.

He is married to Kusum Haider, a theatre and movie artist. He has a son, Nadeem Haidar (SOAS alumnus) and a daughter, Navina Najat Haidar, author and art curator at the Metropolitan Museum of Art, New York. Nadeem's wife Sushasini is the younger daughter of politician Subramanian Swamy.

Diplomatic posts
Preceded by C. V. Ranganathan	Ambassador of India to China; 1991 - 1992	Succeeded by Chandrashekhar Dasgupta
Preceded by Krishnan Srinivasan	Foreign Secretary of India; 1995 - 1997	Succeeded by K. Raghunath
Preceded by Laxmi Mall Singhvi	High Commissioner of India to the United Kingdom; 1998 - 1998	Succeeded by Lalit Mansingh
