= W. Z. Ahmed =

Pakistani film director (1916 - 2007)

Wahiduddin Ziauddin Ahmed (1916 – 15 April 2007) was a Pakistani filmmaker, known primarily for his work in the 1940s. After the partition of India, Ahmed continued to make movies in Pakistan but was able to make only two films.

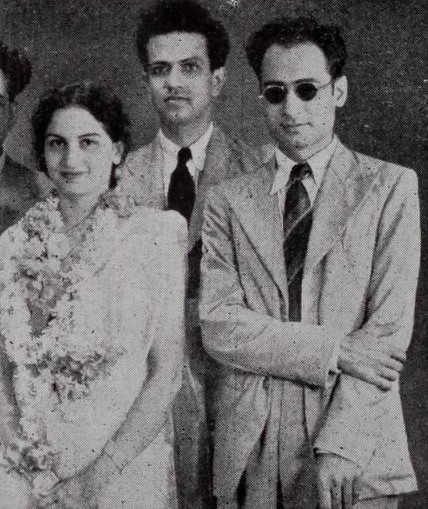
Ahmed (right) with his second wife, Neena (left), and her then-husband Mohsin Abdullah (mid), in Karachi, c. 1942

== Career in British India ==
W.Z. Ahmed was born in Gujarat in 1916. He was active as a film-maker in pre-Partition India, being an established personality in the film industry in Bombay and Pune. Apart from his Shalimar Pictures in Pune, he also ran a studio in Madras. He wrote the dialogues for the 1940 movie Kumkum the Dancer. Between 1942 and 1947, he produced and directed Ek Raat (1942), Man Ki Jeet (1944), Prem Sangeet, Prithaviraj-Samyukta and Meera Bai (1947). Some noted poets and writers of the Progressive Writers' Association were employed by Shalimar Pictures studio including Josh Malihabadi, Krishan Chander, Ramanand Sagar, Akhtar ul Iman and Saghar Nizami. W.Z. Ahmed's last movie produced in India, which depicted Hindu devotee Meera Bai, was met with ferocious criticism along communal lines in Filmindia whose editor Baburao Patel stated that 'Muslim "Meerabai" grossly slanders Hinduism!'.

== Career in Pakistan ==
After the independence of Pakistan in 1947, Ahmed was a prominent cultural personality in Pakistan for a few years, although his cinematic career did not develop well in Pakistan. He established W.Z. Studios in Lahore.

W.Z. Ahmed made only two movies in Pakistan, Roohi (1954) and Waadah (1957). Film songs of Waada (1957) were written by a noted Pakistani film lyricist Saifuddin Saif and its popular music was by Rashid Attre. Notably Roohi was the first film to be banned in independent Pakistan. It was charged with inciting 'class hatred'. Nevertheless, the ban on Roohi was lifted in 1954.

In 1954, W.Z. Ahmed played a prominent role in campaign against imports of Indian films. He was arrested during the agitation but released later.

W.Z. Ahmed's ninth movie, Wafa Ki Ada, was never completed nor released.

== Family ==
His father had been a prominent police officer in Gujarat, British India. His brothers included Z.A. Ahmed (a prominent communist politician in Uttar Pradesh) and Zafaruddin Ahmed (Deputy Inspector of Police in Karachi). W.Z. Ahmed's first wife was Safia Hidayattullah. He later married actress Neena (born as Shahida Begum), who had acted in several of his films in Bombay. His only son Fariduddin Ahmed better known as Farid Ahmed, also was a filmmaker in Pakistan who married noted the television actress Samina Ahmad. Farid Ahmed died an early death in 1993.

== Awards and recognition ==
- Nigar Award - Best Director for Waada (1957).

== Death ==
W.Z. Ahmed died on 15 April 2007 at age 91. He is buried at Bagh-i-Rehmat graveyard in Lahore, Pakistan.
