= Waheed Jahan Begum =

Indian educationist (1884–1939)

- Born: Waheed Jahan Beg; 1884; Delhi, British Raj, British India
- Died: 18 August 1939 (aged 54–55); Delhi, British India
- Other names: Ala Bi; Begum Abdullah
- Occupations: Educationist; Women's activist; Writer; Social reformer; Teacher
- Years active: 1902 – 1939
- Known for: Founder of Women's College, Aligarh; Her contribution to the female education
- Spouse: Sheikh Abdullah (m. 1902; died 1939)
- Children: Rashid Jahan (daughter); Begum Khurshid Mirza (daughter)
- Parent: Mirza Mohammad Ibrahim Beg (father)
- Relatives: Hamida Saiduzzafar (daughter-in-law); Neena (daughter-in-law); Uzra Butt (niece); Zohra Sehgal (niece); Hajrah Begum (niece); See Mumtazullah Khan family

Waheed Jahan Begum (1884 – 18 August 1939) was an Indian social reformer and educator who was a prominent figure in the movement for Muslim women's education during British colonial rule. Alongside her husband, Sheikh Abdullah, she co-founded a girls' school in Aligarh in 1906, which eventually developed into the Women's College at Aligarh Muslim University (AMU) in 1937. She was affectionately known as "Ala Bi" (mother) by her students, while her husband was called "Papa Mian" (father).

== Early life and education ==
Waheed Jahan Begum was born in 1884 in Delhi into a landholding family. Though formal schooling for girls was rare at the time, her father, Mirza Mohammad Ibrahim Beg, ensured she became fluent in Urdu and Persian and also learned elementary English and arithmetic. From a young age, she showed a passion for education by gathering children from the neighborhood and her household staff to teach them in a group setting, one of her first concerted efforts at establishing a school-like environment.

== Career ==
After marrying Sheikh Abdullah, a Kashmiri lawyer and a key figure in the Aligarh Movement, Waheed Jahan encouraged and partnered with him in his efforts to promote modern education for Muslim women, despite significant societal opposition. The couple concluded that training female teachers was essential for the movement's success.

=== Activism ===
She started Khatun Magazine to spread awareness about education. In 1904 to 1914, she served as the editor of Khatun (Woman), an Urdu-language monthly magazine published by the couple to raise awareness about the importance of female education and to foster a literary spirit among women. The magazine provided progressive role models and helped normalize the idea of modern education for women.

In 1905, Waheed Jahan helped organize a revolutionary meeting of Muslim women from across India to discuss social issues and women's education, which led to a resolution favoring a girls' school in Aligarh. A primary school (Zenana Madrasa) with five students was successfully started in a rented property in October 1906, teaching the Quran, Urdu, arithmetic, and needlework.

She became the superintendent of the Boarding House and the school grew, and a foundation stone for a hostel was laid in 1911. To gain social acceptance from the conservative Muslim elite, strict purdah (seclusion) was enforced, including using curtained carriages (daulis) to transport girls to school. Waheed Jahan moved into the hostel and personally managed the daily lives of the students, acting as a surrogate mother and mentor for 25 years.

== Personal life ==
Waheed Jahan and Sheikh Abdullah had six children: five daughters and one son. Their daughter, Rashid Jahan, became a noted doctor and writer and a key figure in the Urdu Progressive Writers' Movement. Begum Khurshid Mirza became a popular actress and singer in Hindi Cinema. Another daughter, Mumtaz Jahan Haider, later served as the Principal of the Women's College for 30 years. Her second daughter Khatoon Jahan also served as the Principal of the Women's College.

== Death ==
Waheed Jahan Begum died in August 18, 1939 and by the time of her death, the institution she helped found had developed from a school into a degree-granting women's college at Aligarh Muslim University.

== Legacy ==
Waheed Jahan Begum's relentless efforts and sacrifices, often from behind the scenes, were crucial in establishing one of India's first successful efforts to provide modern education to Muslim girls. Her work helped pave the way for the emancipation and empowerment of future generations of Muslim women in the subcontinent. The Women's College at AMU stands as a testament to her vision and commitment.
