= Z. A. Ahmed =

Indian politician

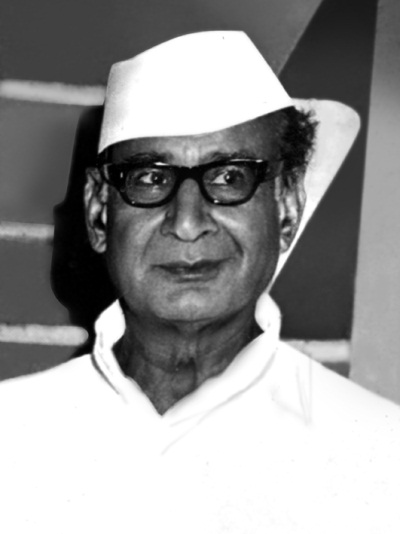

MP of Rajya Sabha for Uttar Pradesh
- In office 1958–1962
- In office 1966–1972
- In office 1972–1978
- In office 1990–1994

Personal details
- Born: 29 October 1908
- Died: 22 February 1999 (aged 90)
- Spouse: Hajrah Begum
- Parent: Ziauddin Ahmad (father)

Z. A. Ahmed (29 October 1908 – 22 February 1999) was an Indian politician from Uttar Pradesh, belonging to the Communist Party of India. In the 1930s, acting on instructions from the CPI, he joined the Congress Socialist Party in which he served as All India Joint Secretary. After a brief period in exile in Pakistan in the 1940s, Ahmed returned to India and became Secretary of the Uttar Pradesh Committee of the CPI. He subsequently served in the Rajya Sabha for four terms, his last term ending in 1994.

== Student years and Congress leader ==
Z. A. Ahmed studied at Cambridge University in the 1930s. In Britain he befriended Sajjad Zaheer and K. M. Ashraf, upon returning to India all three joined the Congress Socialist Party upon instructions from the underground CPI. Ahmed served as All India Joint Secretary of CSP around 1937–1938. Alongside Sajjad Zaheer, Ahmed served with Jawaharlal Nehru in Allahabad during Nehru's tenure as the All India Congress Committee president. He served as secretary of the United Provinces Congress Committee 1937–1939.

== Exile in Pakistan ==
Ahmed emerged as a prominent figure of the CPI in the United Provinces. Unlike a number of other Muslim CPI leaders, Ahmed did not opt to migrate to Pakistan after the 1948 Second CPI Congress in Calcutta. His close friend Sajjad Zaheer, for example, migrated to Pakistan and became the General Secretary of the Communist Party of Pakistan. Ahmed had been asked by the CPI to migrate to Pakistan to help build the party there, but declined.

However, with an arrest warrant in his name in India he left for Lahore. Moreover, he was also facing problems inside the CPI as he did not adhere to the B. T. Ranadive line that had emerged victorious at the Second Party Congress. At Lahore he lodged with his brother W. Z. Ahmed (a prominent filmmaker) for a few weeks. An arrest warrant was issued in Lahore as well and Ahmed shifted to Karachi where he became the guest of his brother, Zafaruddin Ahmed. Zafaruddin served as Deputy Inspector General of Police in Karachi, and came under pressure to hand over Ahmed to the authorities but refused to comply. After staying in Karachi for about a month, Ahmed returned to India.

== Parliamentarian ==
He was a member of the Rajya Sabha for four terms: 1958–1962, 1966–1972, 1972–1978, and 1990–1994.

From 1976–1978, he was Chairman of the Committee on Government Assurances of the Rajya Sabha. He was Secretary of the Uttar Pradesh Committee of the Communist Party of India from 1951–56.

== Family ==
Ahmed's father had been a prominent police officer in Gujarat. His brothers included filmmaker W.Z. Ahmed and Zafaruddin Ahmed (Deputy Inspector of Police in Karachi, father of Iqbal Z. Ahmed).

After his return from Britain, Ahmed married Hajra Begum. She had also studied in Britain and had belonged to the same communist milieu there. She also joined the CSP. The couple had one daughter.

== Bibliography ==
- Ali, Kamran Asdar (2015), Surkh Salam: Communist Politics and Class Activism in Pakistan, 1947–1972, p. 319, ISBN 978-0-19-940308-0
- Dhulipala, Venkat (9 February 2015), Creating a New Medina, Cambridge University Press, ISBN 978-1-107-05212-3
- Menon, Visalakshi (2003), Indian Women and Nationalism, the U.P. Story, Har-Anand Publications, ISBN 978-81-241-0939-7
- Menon, Visalakshi (11 September 2003), From Movement To Government: The Congress in the United Provinces, 1937–42, SAGE Publications, ISBN 978-81-321-0368-4
- Roy, Samaren (1 January 1997), M.N. Roy: A Political Biography, Orient Blackswan, ISBN 978-81-250-0299-4
- Sharma, Sita Ram (1994), Panchayati Raj and Education in India, Mittal Publications, ISBN 978-81-7099-546-3
