= Sahara (1943 Hindi film) =

- Directed by: Jagatrai Pesumal Advani
- Produced by: Vaswani Art Production
- Starring: S. D. Narang; Pran; Meena Shorey; Sharda; Renuka Devi
- Music by: Gobind Ram
- Distributed by: Vaswani Art Productions
- Release date: 1943
- Country: India
- Language: Hindi

Sahara is a Bollywood film. It was released in 1943. The film is directed by Jagatrai Pesumal Advani for Vaswani Art productions. It had music composed by Gobind Ram. The film starred Renuka Devi, S. D. Narang, Pran, Meena Kumari and Sharda

== Cast ==
- Renuka Devi
- S. D. Narang
- Pran
- Meena Kumari
- Sharda
