= Man Ki Jeet =

- Directed by: W. Z. Ahmed
- Based on: Tess of the D’Urbervilles by Thomas Hardy
- Release date: 1944
- Country: India
- Language: Hindi

Man Ki Jeet is a 1944 Indian Hindi-language film directed by W. Z. Ahmed. It is an adaptation of Thomas Hardy's 19th-century English novel Tess of the D’Urbervilles to an Indian setting. The film featured Neena and Shyam in leading roles.
