= Tandoori Nights =

British TV sitcom

- Genre: Sitcom
- Written by: Farrukh Dhondy
- Directed by: Jon Amiel
- Starring: Saeed Jaffrey; Tariq Yunus; Rita Wolf; Zohra Sehgal
- Composer: Nicholas Carr
- Country of origin: United Kingdom
- Original language: English
- No. of series: 2
- No. of episodes: 12

Production
- Running time: 30 minutes

Original release
- Network: Channel 4
- Release: 4 July 1985 – 13 November 1987

Tandoori Nights is a television sitcom that was broadcast on Channel 4 between 4 July 1985 and 13 November 1987. It consisted of two series of six episodes each. The series was directed by Jon Amiel and written by Farrukh Dhondy. It is the story of two rival restaurants in London, and starred Saeed Jaffrey, Tariq Yunus, Rita Wolf and Zohra Sehgal. It was Channel 4's first Asian comedy series.

After the sitcom had been commissioned to be written, Farrukh Dhondy himself became Channel 4's commissioning editor for multicultural programmes. Meera Syal wrote an episode for the sitcom (4 July 1985).

Tandoori Nights traded on some pre-existing Asian stereotypes: an Indian restaurant setting; a conniving businessman (Jimmy Sharma, played by Saeed Jaffrey) who views dating white women as 'social climbing'; a rebellious daughter (played by Rita Wolf); and a bumbling servant-fool (Alaudin, played by Tariq Yunus).

== Plot summary ==
Jimmy Sharma is the owner of Jewel in the Crown, a Tandoori restaurant in Ealing, west London. His rival is The Far Pavilions, the restaurant across the street.
