= Ek Raat =

- Directed by: Wahid-ud-din Zia-ud-din Ahmed
- Starring: Prithviraj Kapoor; K.N. Singh; Neena; Miss Gulab; Mubarak; Feroza; Parkash; Suleman
- Release date: 1942
- Running time: 143 min
- Country: India
- Language: Hindi

Ek Raat is a Bollywood film. It was released in 1942.

== Cast ==
- Prithviraj Kapoor
- K.N. Singh
- Neena
- Miss Gulab
- Mubarak
- Feroza
- Parkash
- Suleman
