= Krishnan Srinivasan =

Indian diplomat (born 1937)

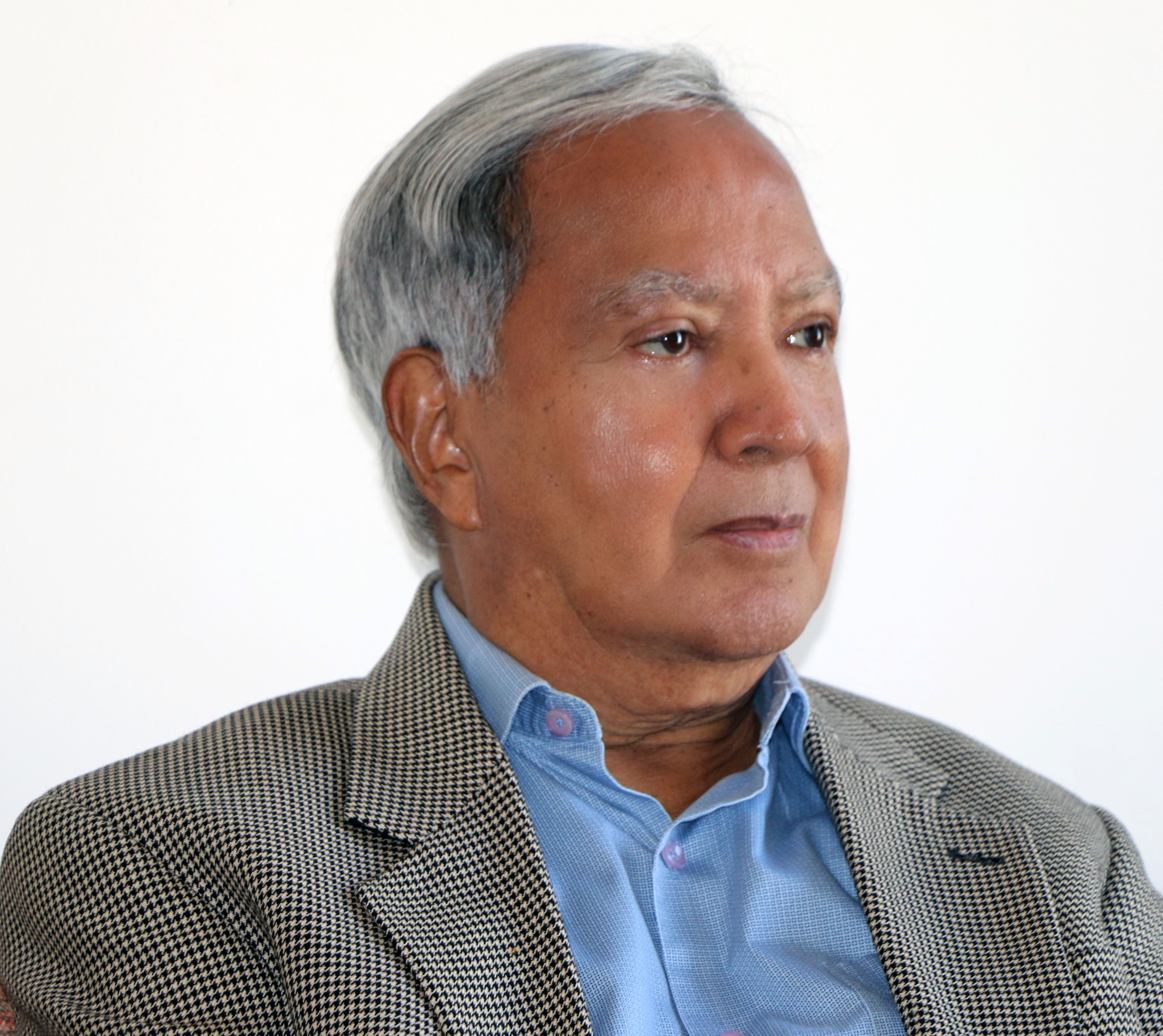
- Srinivasan in 2024

Commonwealth Deputy Secretary-General for Political Affairs
- In office 1995–2002

19th Indian Foreign Secretary
- In office 1 February 1994 – 28 February 1995
- Preceded by: J N Dixit
- Succeeded by: Salman Haider

Personal details
- Born: 15 February 1937 (age 89) Madras (now Chennai)
- Spouse: Brinda
- Children: Rohan
- Occupation: Diplomat and scholar

Krishnan Srinivasan (born 15 February 1937) is a former Foreign Secretary of India and Deputy Secretary-General of the Commonwealth of Nations. Alongside his diplomatic career, Srinivasan has published memoirs, scholarly works on international relations, and the Ambassador Marco series of crime novels. His observations on the status and values of the Commonwealth of Nations in The Rise, Decline and Future of the British Commonwealth (2005) provoked debate about the organisation's future direction.

== Indian Foreign Service ==
Srinivasan was born in Madras (now Chennai). Following an education in England at Bedford School and Christ Church, Oxford he joined the Indian Foreign Service in May 1959. His early postings included Oslo and Beirut, and then as India's Chargé d'Affaires in Tripoli. He was Ambassador/High Commissioner to Zambia, Botswana, Nigeria, Benin, Cameroon, The Netherlands and Bangladesh, before being appointed Foreign Secretary of India in 1994.

Srinivasan published the week-by-week diaries that he maintained as High Commissioner of India to Bangladesh during the period 1989-1992, as The Jamdani Revolution; Politics, Personalities and Civil Society in Bangladesh (2007). It covers the period when civil society brought down General Ershad, in the first-ever overthrow of a military-backed regime in South Asia. The work is also notable for throwing a "candid light on the day-to-day activities of an Indian envoy, his actions with and without instructions from New Delhi, and the frustrations with headquarters that characterize the experience of every ambassador".

In 2012, Srinivasan published Diplomatic Channels, an "exceptionally frank memoir of his tenure as Foreign Secretary [including] his impressions of the personalities he encountered, and the topics in foreign policy that arose in the early 1990s".

== Commonwealth of Nations ==
In 1995, Srinivasan was appointed Commonwealth Deputy Secretary-General for Political Affairs in London.

In 2002, after completing the maximum allowed two terms as Commonwealth Deputy Secretary-General, Srinivasan began a number of academic fellowships, including at Wolfson College and the Centre for International Studies in Cambridge and the Institute of Commonwealth Studies, London. This period culminated in the publication of The Rise, Decline and Future of the British Commonwealth (2005).

A masterly and properly controversial assessment of the contemporary Commonwealth [...] This wide-ranging, unsentimental and sometimes provocative analysis of the post 1945 Commonwealth will be essential reading for students of the decline and fall of the British and other European empires, and the post colonial order, and also for all those interested in the contemporary Commonwealth's attempt to define a role for itself in world politics.

— James Mayall, Professor of International Relations (Emeritus), University of Cambridge. Review of The Rise, Decline and Future of the British Commonwealth (2005)

There was a strong reaction, in some quarters, to the book and associated journal articles, which helped to re-invigorate the contemporary debate over the Commonwealth's purpose and future direction.

== The Ambassador Marco novels ==
The novels follow the career of Somali Ambassador Michael Marco, thus named because he was born in Italian Somaliland. He is first a lawyer, then appointed by the Somali dictator as ambassador to Southern Africa, where he is engaged in helping the liberation forces against apartheid South Africa. Dismissed by the Somali authorities, he joins the UN as OAU ambassador, and investigates the rumoured development of an atomic bomb by Libya. In Britain, he unravels the disappearance of several African ambassadors, and moving to India pursuing research as a retired diplomat, Marco solves the mystery of a missing Indian film crew in Sweden, prevents conflict between India and Pakistan and becomes the confidant to a young but physically handicapped female private detective.

== Awards and honours ==
- He was a member of Christ Church, Oxford's Senior Common Room and High Table from 1998 to 2016.
- He was awarded a Hind Ratna in 2002 by non-resident Indians for services to their community.
- Fellow at the Netherlands Institute for Advanced Study 2003 to 2004.
- He was elected Honorary Professor at ASCI Hyderabad in 2005.
- Fellow of the Maulana Abul Kalam Azad Institute of Asian Studies, Kolkata from 2006 to 2015.
- Was made a Chevalier de l'Ordre de la Valeur (Cameroon) in 2007.
- Fellow of the Swedish Collegium for Advanced Study at Uppsala in 2008 and 2012 to 2013.

== Bibliography ==
=== Non-fiction: Memoirs ===
Works of commentary on Srinivasan's diplomatic experiences, personalities encountered and topics of foreign policy.

- Tricks of the Trade: or, Diplomacy, Day by Day (2000)
- The Jamdani Revolution; Politics, Personalities and Civil Society in Bangladesh (2007)
- Diplomatic Channels (2012)

=== Non-fiction: Foreign Policy ===
Scholarly works dealing with Indian and global foreign policy issues and institutions.

- The Rise, Decline and Future of the British Commonwealth (2005)
- Towards the New Horizon: World Order in the 21st Century (2009)
- Europe in Emerging Asia: Opportunities and Obstacles in Political and Economic Encounters (2015)
- Old Europe, New Asia (2015)
- Values in Foreign Policy, Investigating Ideals and Interests (2019)
- Power, Legitimacy and World Order: Changing Contours of Preconditions and Perspectives (2023)

=== Fiction ===
==== Poetry and Short Stories ====
- Selections in Two Keys (1974)
- The Water's Edge & Other Stories (1980)

==== The Ambassador Marco crime novels ====
- The Eccentric Effect (2001)
- The Ugly Ambassador (2003)
- Guesswork (2005)
- The Invisible African (2012)
- Ambassador Marco's Indian Instincts (2016)
- The Ambassador and the Private Eye (2021)
- Right Angle to Life (2024)
- Kolkata Crimes (2025)

=== Newspapers and Journals ===
He has written over 500 columns and book reviews, on international affairs and other subjects, for Indian media platforms, including: Deccan Herald, The Hindu, News9, The Open, The Telegraph, The Statesman, and The Wire.

Diplomatic posts
Preceded by Indrajit Singh Chadha	High Commissioner of India to Bangladesh; 1989-1992	Succeeded by K. Raghunath
Preceded by J. N. Dixit	Foreign Secretary of India; 1994-1995	Succeeded by Salman Haidar
Preceded by Anthony Siaguru	Commonwealth Deputy Secretary-General for Political Affairs; 1995-2002	Succeeded by Florence Mugasha
