= Neena (Hindi actress) =

Hindi film actress (1919–1990)

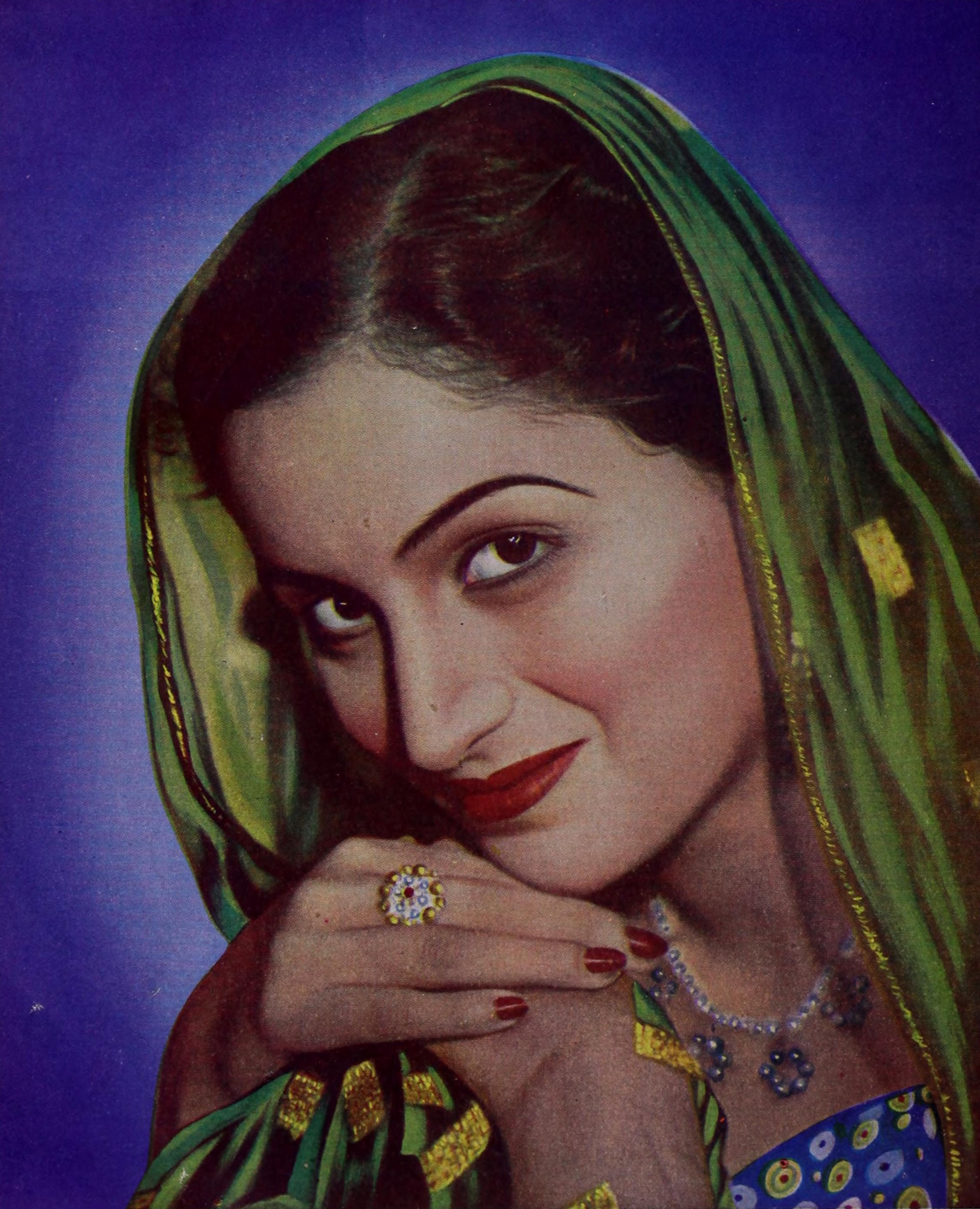
- Neena in a publicity still for Ek Raat (1942)
- Born: Shahida Begum; 12 July 1919; Aligarh, Uttar Pradesh, British India
- Died: April 1990 (aged 70); Pakistan
- Occupation: Actress
- Years active: 1942–1951
- Spouses: Mohsin Abdullah (div. 1946); W. Z. Ahmed
- Children: 2
- Relatives: Via her first marriage: Sheikh Abdullah (father-in-law); Waheed Jahan Begum (mother-in-law); Begum Khurshid Mirza (sister-in-law) Rashid Jahan (sister-in-law)

Shahida Begum (12 July 1919 – April 1990), better known by the screen name Neena, was an actress born in British India who worked in Hindi-language films in the 1940s and later in Pakistani cinema.

She made her film debut in W. Z. Ahmed's thriller Ek Raat (1942), opposite Prithviraj Kapoor, and was introduced through an extensive publicity campaign as the "mysterious Neena". She subsequently appeared in Ahmed's further productions: Prem Sangeet (1943), Man Ki Jeet (1944), Prithviraj Sanyukta (1946) and Meera Bai (1947 film).

== Background and personal life ==
Neena was initially married to Mohsin Abdullah (the son of Sheikh Abdullah), whom she divorced in 1946. According to a major Indian film website, "Unfortunately, her marriage ran aground due to Mohsin's callous attitude towards both her and her work. Rumoured to be a rampant womanizer, Mohsin lost most of his money to gambling. Increasingly distanced from her husband, Neena developed a close bond with the ever courteous W. Z. Ahmed". She later married Ahmed and moved to Lahore, Pakistan, with him following the Partition of India. In Pakistan, she made her final screen appearance in Akeli (1951 film).

Urdu writer Saadat Hasan Manto dedicated a chapter to Neena in his collection of sketches, Ganjay Farishtay (later translated into English as Stars From Another Sky). Neena's sketch, titled "The Inscrutable Housewife", explored her transition from an ordinary housewife into a film star.

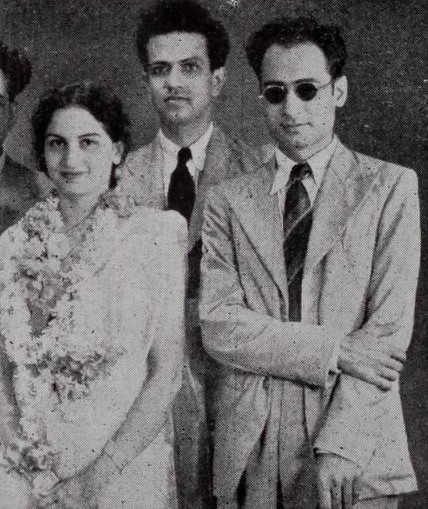
Neena with her then-husband, Mohsin Abdullah (mid), and her future second husband, W. Z. Ahmed (right), in Karachi, c. 1942

Neena was born Shahida Begum on 12 July 1919 in Aligarh, Uttar Pradesh, where she also completed her graduation. She was a close friend of actress Begum Khurshid Mirza. Neena married Mirza's brother, Mohsin Abdullah. They had two sons, Kamal and Tariq; Kamal died at the age of two.

Neena divorced Abdullah in 1946 and subsequently married filmmaker W. Z. Ahmed. She died in April 1990 in Pakistan.

== Career ==
"Shalimar Studio ... was built on her fragile shoulders. Ahmed became a producer and turned the simple Shahida into "Neena, the mystery girl". He ran a huge publicity campaign to introduce his star. You only had to pick up a movie magazine in those days to read about her. This propaganda barrage created much public curiosity because people were keen to know who this mysterious star was."

— Saadat Hasan Manto in Stars From Another Sky

After moving to Bombay (now Mumbai), Neena entered films at her husband's (Abdullah's) suggestion. Filmmaker W. Z. Ahmed gave her a leading role opposite Prithviraj Kapoor in the thriller Ek Raat, produced by Ahmed's Shalimar Pictures. According to film historian Mushtaq Gazdar, Neena was introduced through a country-wide publicity campaign as the "mysterious Nina" and a femme fatale. The film was released in 1942, with The Times of India reviewing it under the headline: "Neena's Sensational Debut In 'Ek-Raat' Deftly Directed By Ahmed".

Neena subsequently starred opposite P. Jairaj in the musical Prem Sangeet (1943). She was then cast opposite newcomer Shyam in Ahmed's Man Ki Jeet (1944). Although the film was commercially successful, her performance as the village milkmaid Arsi received a mixed assessment from critic Baburao Patel. Patel found her too refined for the part, writing that she looked "a bit too thin for a milkmaid" and that her "fine, cultured and sophisticated features" were difficult to associate with a village milkmaid. In 1945, she was voted the "best-dressed Beauty of the Indian film-world" by the Indian Film Journalists Association (IFJA).

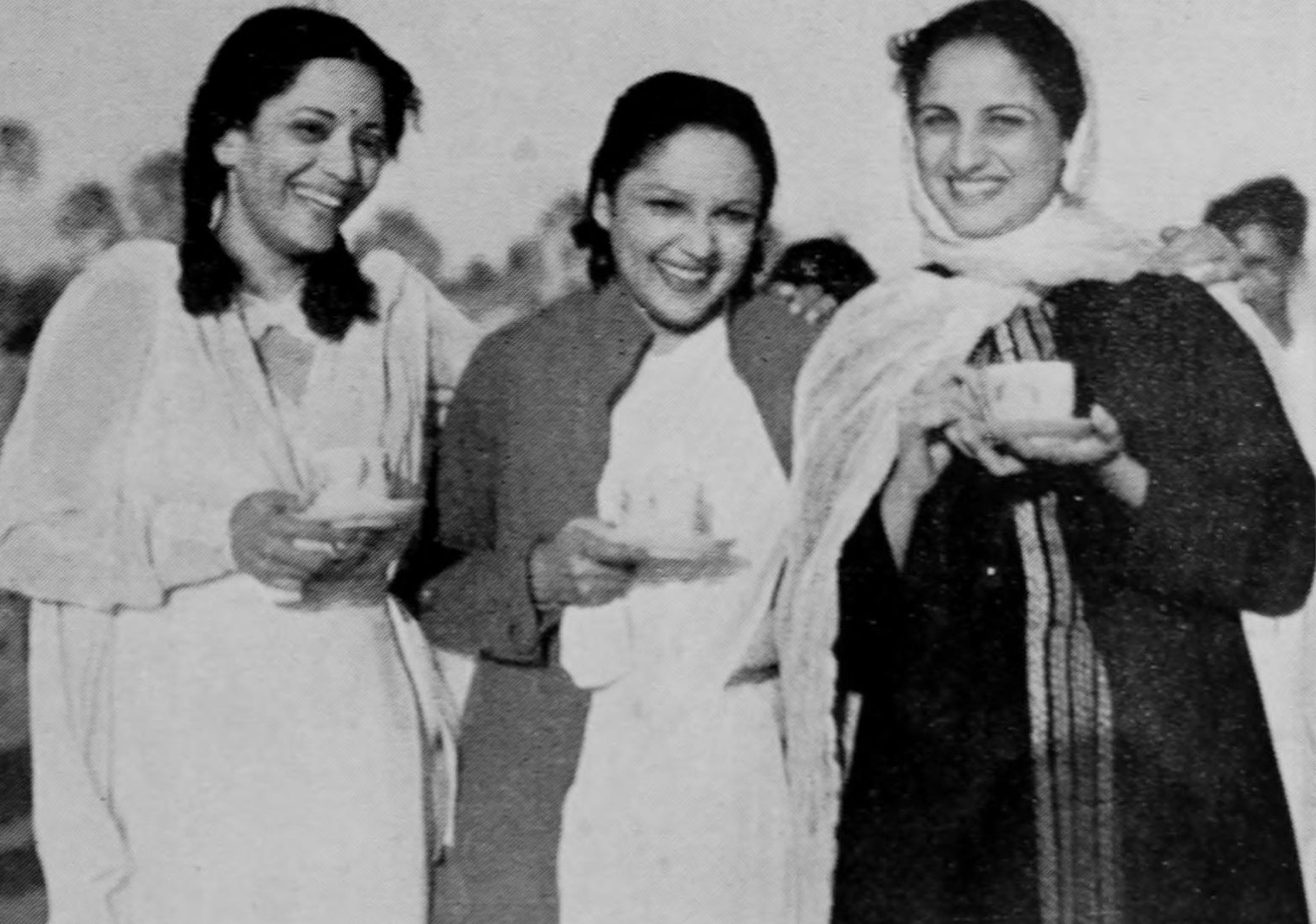
Neena (right) with the two other leading ladies of the era: Leela Chitnis (left) and Devika Rani (mid)

Neena reunited with Kapoor in Ahmed's historical film Prithviraj Sanyukta (1946), in which she portrayed the Rajput queen Sanyukta. Film critic R. A. Shaikh praised her performance, writing that "as Sanyukta [she] has become the very embodiment of the Princely charms of the Glory that was Ind[ia]." The 1946 book Filmdom described Ek Raat, Prem Sangeet, Man Ki Jeet and Prithviraj Sanyukta as "great successes". Neena subsequently portrayed the title character in Ahmed's devotional film Meera Bai (1947), her final collaboration with him.

Following the Partition of India in 1947, Neena and Ahmed moved to the newly-created Pakistan and settled in Lahore. She appeared in the film Akeli (also known as Akaely, 1951), directed by Madan Mohan Mehra, before retiring from cinema.

== Filmography ==
- Ek Raat (1942)
- Prem Sangeet (1943)
- Man Ki Jeet (1944)
- Prithviraj Sanyukta (1946)
- Meera Bai (1947)
- Akeli (1951) — Pakistani release
