= Navina Najat Haidar =

Indian art historian and curator

Navina Najat Haidar is an art historian and curator, and currently serves as the chief curator of Islamic art at the Metropolitan Museum of Art in New York.

== Life ==
Haidar was born in 1968 in London to Salman Haidar, an Indian diplomat, and Kusum Haidar, a stage actress. She was educated in India, and also spent parts of her childhood in Afghanistan, Bhutan, and New York, as a consequence of her father's diplomatic postings. She was initially educated in India at Bal Bharati School in Delhi, Lawrence School Sanawar and St. Stephen's College, Delhi University. She later studied at Oxford University, where she completed a doctorate in art history, studying the Kishangarh school of painting in the 18th century. Her husband, Bernard Haykel is Professor of Middle Eastern Studies at Princeton University.

== Career ==
Haider was appointed the Nasser Sabah al-Ahmad al-Sabah Curator for Islamic art at the Metropolitan Museum of Art in 2018, and was appointed to head the Metropolitan Museum's Department of Islamic Art in 2020. Prior to that, she was the curator in charge of co-ordinating the Metropolitan Museum of Art's New Islamic Galleries project.

During her career as a curator at the Metropolitan Museum of Art, Haidar has curated a number of well-received exhibitions. In 2015 she curated an exhibition of art from the Deccan plateau in India titled Sultans of Deccan India, 1500–1700: Opulence and Fantasy (2015) in which works were collected from institutional and private collections from India, West Asia, Europe and North America. The exhibition was conceived of after a symposium on Deccan art organised by Haidar and Sardar, which focused on textiles and paintings from the Deccan region. The exhibition was very well-received, with the Wall Street Journal describing the collection as "...wonderfully contextualised," and praising the curatorial intent, to conclude that "...the strength of the exhibition and the source of the most dramatic and revelatory information is the magnificent selection of paintings." The New York Times reviewed the exhibition, noting that the exhibition was curated to create a "...comfortable lean-in intimacy....enhanced by the curators’ determination to display some works in a strikingly fresh manner." Haidar lectured on the exhibition in India, with presentations on the collection, receiving positive reviews. Historian William Dalrymple also positively reviewed the exhibition for the New York Review of Books and described the related publication with the same name as one of his favourite books of that year. It was followed by a publication authored by Haidar and Sarkar titled with the same name as the exhibition. The book won the Foreword Reviews' Book of the Year Award. In 2016, Haidar curated a collection of Rajput art for the Metropolitan Museum of Art, which was also well-received and accompanied by a collection of essays on Rajput art, including one authored by Haidar. As the curator for the museum's New Islamic Galleries project, Haidar along with curator Sheila Canby also directed and oversaw the construction of new galleries and installations, including the installation of a Moroccan court within the museum's premises. New York Magazine's art critic, Jerry Saltz, praised these redesigned galleries as constituting a "...magnificently redesigned and generously expanded swath of space." and the New York Times describing it as "...intelligent as it is visually resplendent." In addition to her curatorial work, Haidar has made contributions on art history in The Hindu and Newsweek Pakistan.

== Publications ==
- Navina Haidar, Jali: Lattice of Divine Light in Mughal Architecture, Mapin Publications, Ahmedabad, (2023). Navina Najat Haidar and Marika Sardar, Sultans of Deccan India, 1500-1700: Opulence and Fantasy (2015)
- Navina Najat Haidar, Courtney Ann Stewart, Treasures from India: Jewels from the Al-Thani Collection (2014)
- Ian Alteveer, Navina Najat Haidar, Sheena Wagstaff, Imran Qureshi: The Roof Garden Commission (2013)
- Navina Najat Haidar, Kendra Weisbin, Islamic Art in the Metropolitan Museum of Art: A Walking Guide (2013)
- Navina Najat Haidar and Marika Sardar, Sultans of the South: Arts of India's Deccan Courts, 1323-1687 (2011)
- Navina Najat Haidar, The Kishangarh School of Painting, C.1680-1850 (1995)
