= Hamida Saiduzzafar =

Indian ophthalmologist

- Born: 16 July 1921; Nainital
- Died: 1988 (aged 66–67)
- Other names: Hamida Said-uz-Zafar
- Occupation: Ophthalmologist
- Relatives: Zohra Sehgal (cousin); Uzra Butt (cousin); Rashid Jahan (sister-in-law); Sheikh Abdullah (father-in-law); Begum Khurshid Mirza (sister-in-law)

Hamida Saiduzzafar (16 July 1921 – 1988) was an Indian ophthalmologist.

== Early life ==
Saiduzzafar was born in Nainital, the daughter of Sahibzada Saiduzzafar Khan and Shaukat Ara Begum. Her father was a physician and medical school professor in Lucknow. She earned a medical degree from King George's Medical College in Lucknow, and a doctorate in ophthalmology at the University of London. While in England, she trained at Moorfields Eye Hospital, and did further work in glaucoma research in London.

Writer Rashid Jahan was Saiduzzafar's sister-in-law. Performers Uzra Butt and Zohra Sehgal were her cousins.

== Career ==
Saiduzzafar was an ophthalmic surgeon in Aligharh, at the Gandhi Eye Hospital. From 1978 to 1981, she was a professor at Aligarh Muslim University. In 1982, she received the Distinguished Woman Award from Banaras Hindu University. In 1987, she worked with the World Health Organization on blindness and glaucoma. She published research in the British Journal of Ophthalmology, the Indian Journal of Ophthalmology, and Experimental Eye Research.

Saiduzzafar was a member of the British Medical Association, the Ophthalmological Society of the United Kingdom, the All India Ophthalmological Society, the National Society for Prevention of Blindness, and many other organizations. She was a fellow of the Royal Society of Medicine. She wrote an autobiography, published posthumously in 1996.

Saiduzzafar was known to be an avid birdwatcher, lectured on birds, and contributed articles to a birdwatchers' newsletter, and to the journal of the Bombay Natural History Society.

== Personal life ==
Hamida Saiduzzafar died in 1988, from a stroke, in her mid-sixties.
