= Shrine of Mian Mir =

Shrine in Lahore, Pakistan

- میاں میر درگاہ
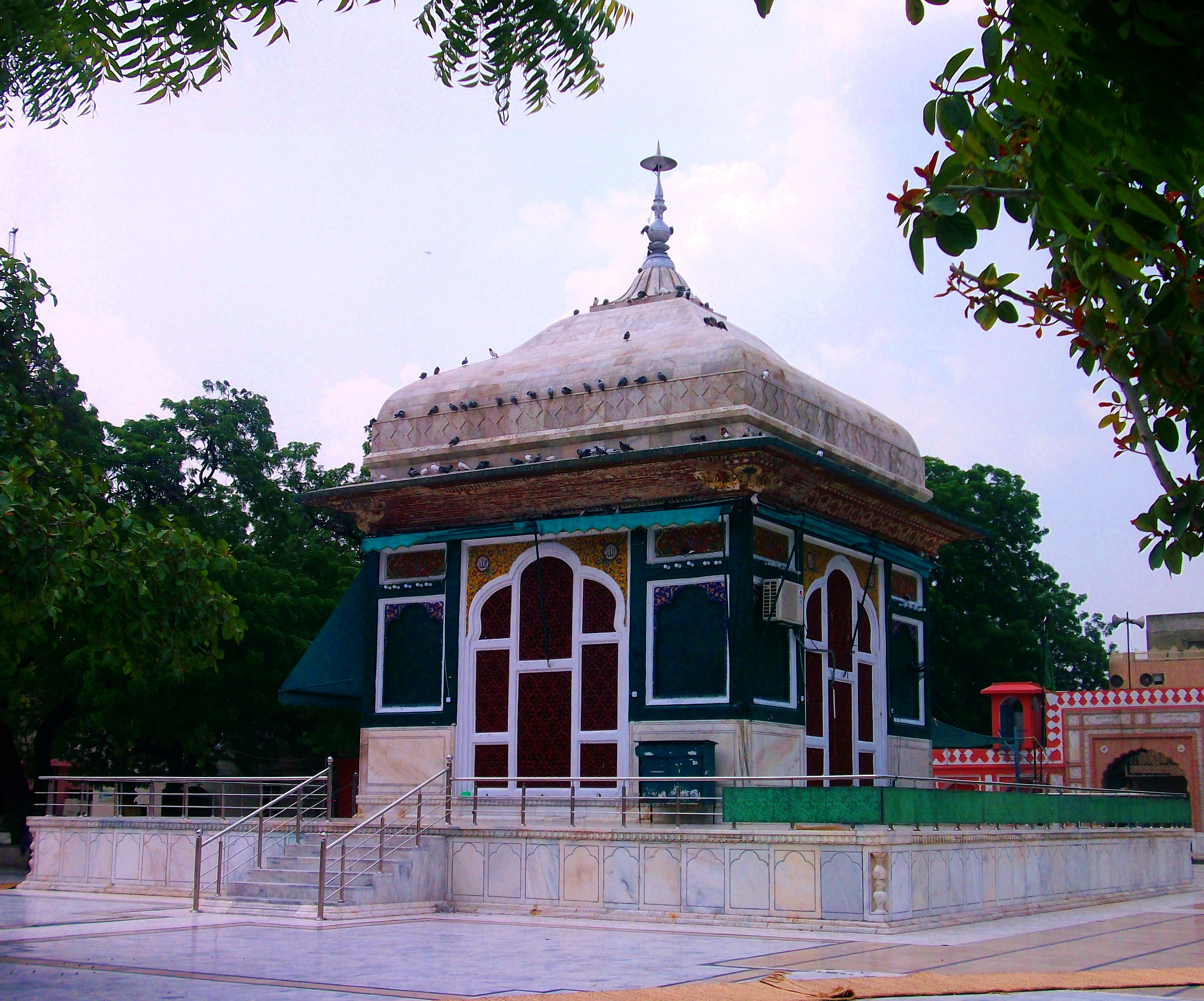
- Mian Mir's shrine is one of the most important Sufi shrines in Lahore

Religion
- Affiliation: Islam
- District: Lahore
- Province: Punjab
- Year consecrated: 1640

Location
- Location: Lahore
- Country: Pakistan
- Interactive map of Shrine of Mian Mir
- Coordinates: 31°32′54.15″N 74°21′36.11″E

Architecture
- Type: Mosque and Sufi mausoleum
- Dome: 1

The Shrine of Mian Mir (Punjabi and Urdu: میاں میر درگاہ) is a 17th-century shrine located in Lahore, Pakistan, that is dedicated to the Sufi mystic Mian Mir. The shrine is one of the most celebrated in Lahore, and has historically been revered by both Muslims and Sikhs.

== Location ==
The tomb is located in the Alam Ganj neighbourhood of the Dharampura municipality, approximately 3 kilometres west of Lahore's Walled City.

== History ==
Mian Mir wished to be buried next to his long-time friend Syed Muhammad Natha Shah Gilani. The tomb was built on the orders of Dara Shikoh, and was completed in 1640.

Dara Shikoh had previously built a shrine dedicated to Mullah Shah, but intended for the shrine of Mian Mir to more superb. After Dara Shikoh's death, the Mughal Emperor Aurangzeb used much of the material collected by Dara Shikoh for the construction of Mian Mir's tomb, and instead used those materials in the construction of Lahore's grand Badshahi Mosque.

The shrine was embellished by the use of precious stones, which were all removed. Ranjit Singh, had the interior of the shrine painted with floral patterns. Ranjit Singh was a pilgrim to the shrine.

== Architecture ==
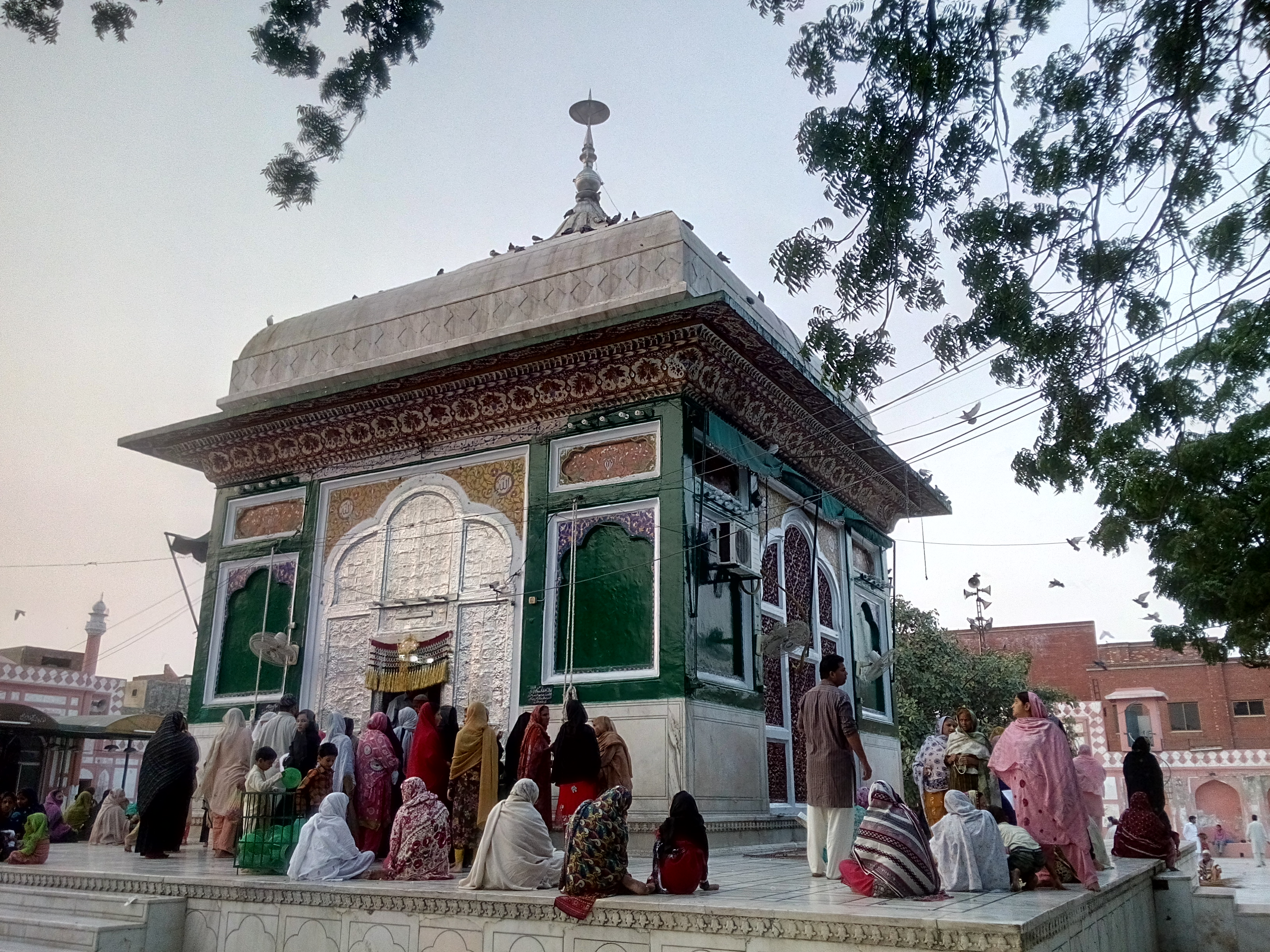
The shrine is popular with devotees.

The tomb is enclosed by a rectangular structure topped by a dome made of gray granite with eaves overhanging the structure known as a chajja. The entire tomb is built upon a raised square plinth made of white marble that measures 54 feet on each edge. The tomb is surrounded by a courtyard made of red sandstone. The tomb itself is accessible from the courtyard by a set of steps made of white marble.

The tomb is located in the centre of quadrangle measuring 200 feet on each side. The quadrangle is enclosed by high walls containing numerous small cells that form a cloister around the tomb on the southern and eastern side of the complex that were used by dervishes and pilgrims. The western portion of the complex is defined by a mosque constructed of pink sandstone, with five short domes atop it. A pink sandstone gateway leads to the shrine, with a couplet in Persian over the entrance reading:

Mian Mir, the title page of devotees, the earth of whose door is as luminous as the Philosopher's stone, took his way to the eternal city when he was weary of this abode of sorrow.

=== Associated shrines ===
Adjacent to the tomb is the tomb of Mian Mir's nephew Muhammed Sharif, who served as the first sajjada nashin, or hereditary caretaker of the shrine. Another tomb, that of Haji Muhammed Saleh, is also located within the shrine complex.

The shrine is located immediately west of the tomb of Nadira Begum, wife of the Mughal prince Dara Shikoh. The shrine of Mullah Shah was also built near the shrine.

== Urs festival ==
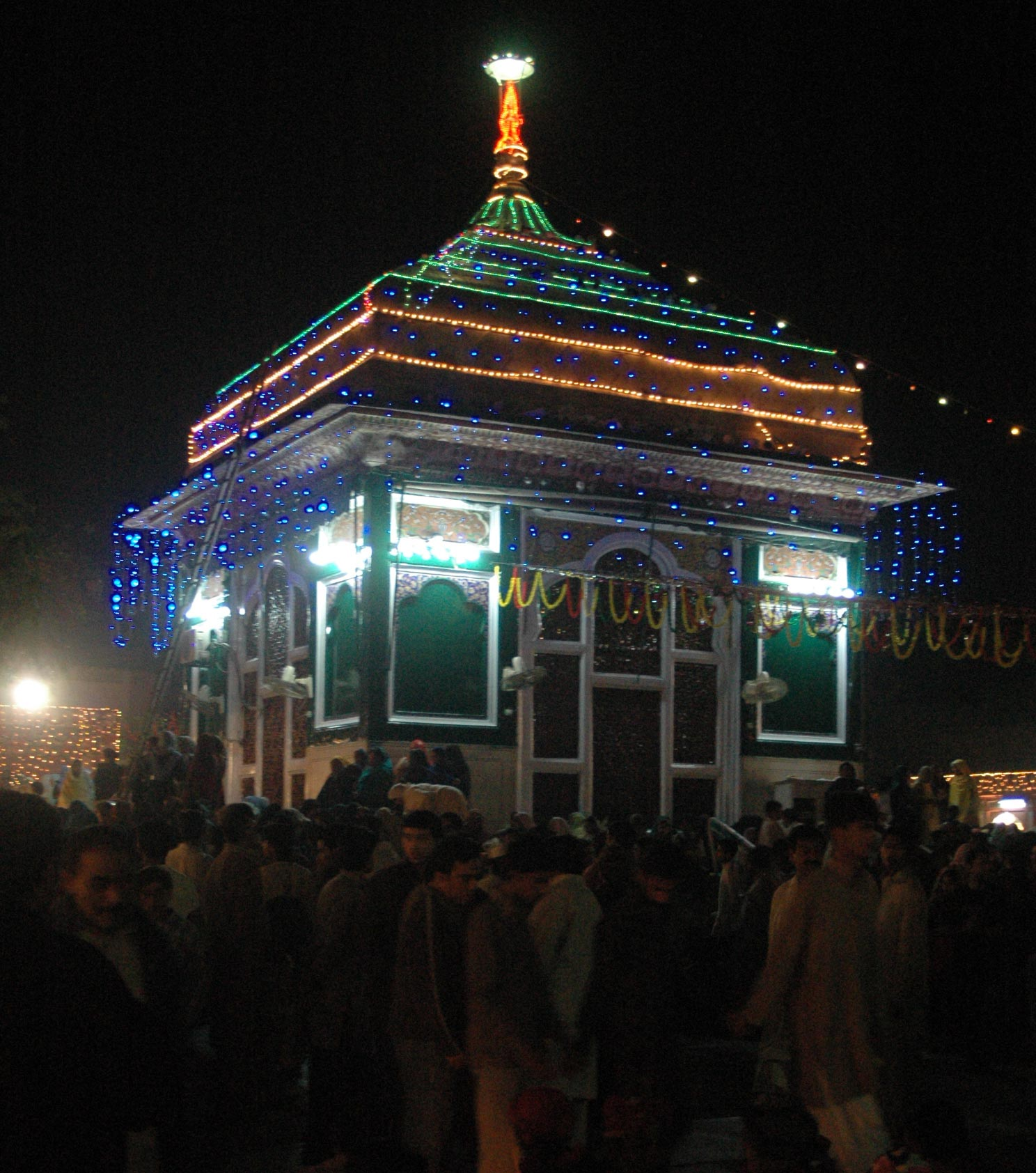
The shrine is illuminated during the annual urs festival, and on religious holidays.

His death anniversary, known as an urs, is observed there by his devotees every year.

== Influence ==
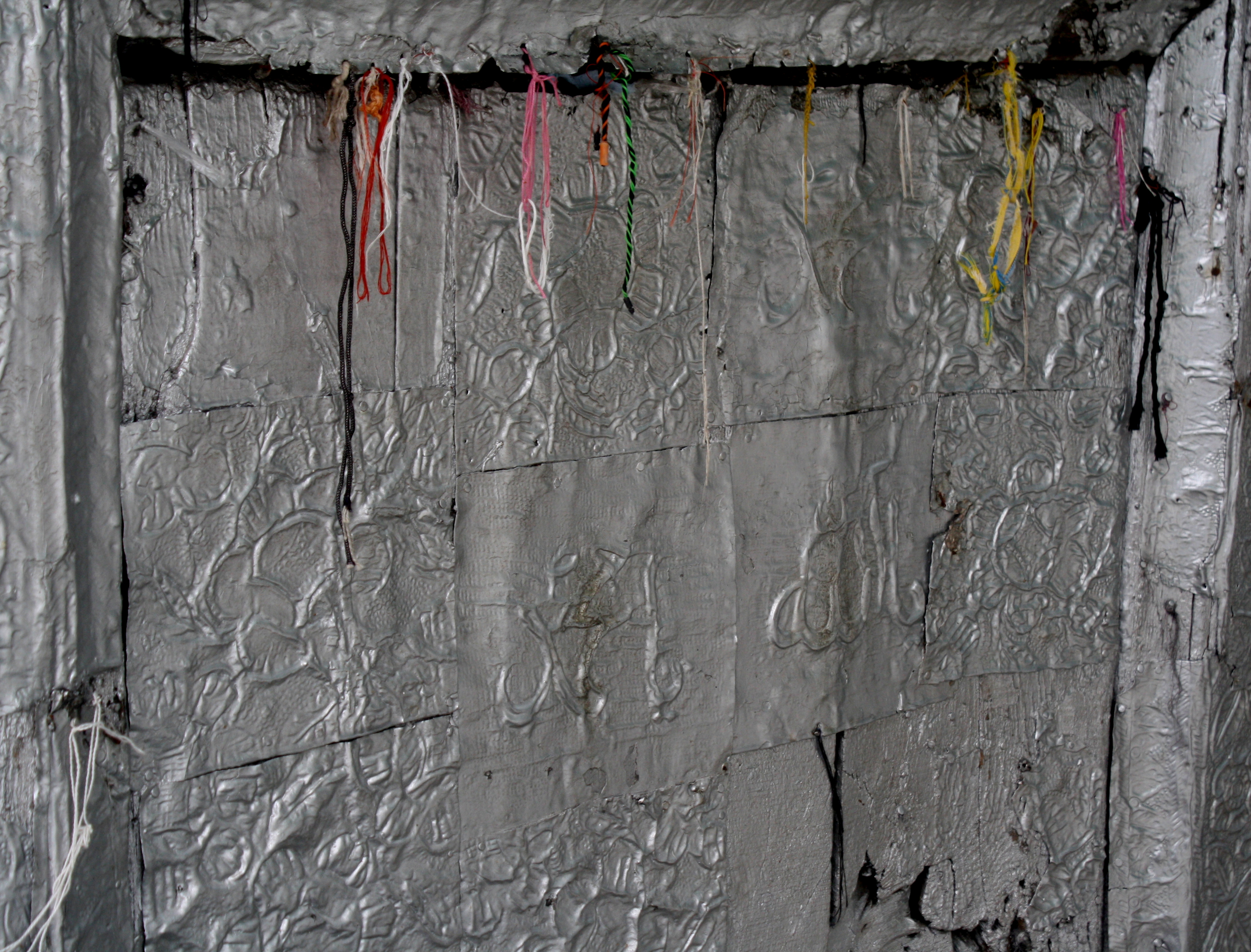
Devotees frequently tie strings of thread as prayers.

The nearby Lahore Cantonment was originally named "Mian Mir Cantonment" in reference to the saint's shrine. The tomb has been used as a focal point to bring together Muslim and Sikhs. The shrine has been suggested to be model for the Golden Temple in nearby Amritsar.

== Shrine administration ==
The shrine is managed by an Awqaf committee that consists of influential persons, such as judges and politicians. The committee has also included a Sikh organization, Guru Nanak Ji Mission, in the committee's activities.

== See also ==
- List of mausolea and shrines in Pakistan
- Sufism in Pakistan

== Gallery ==
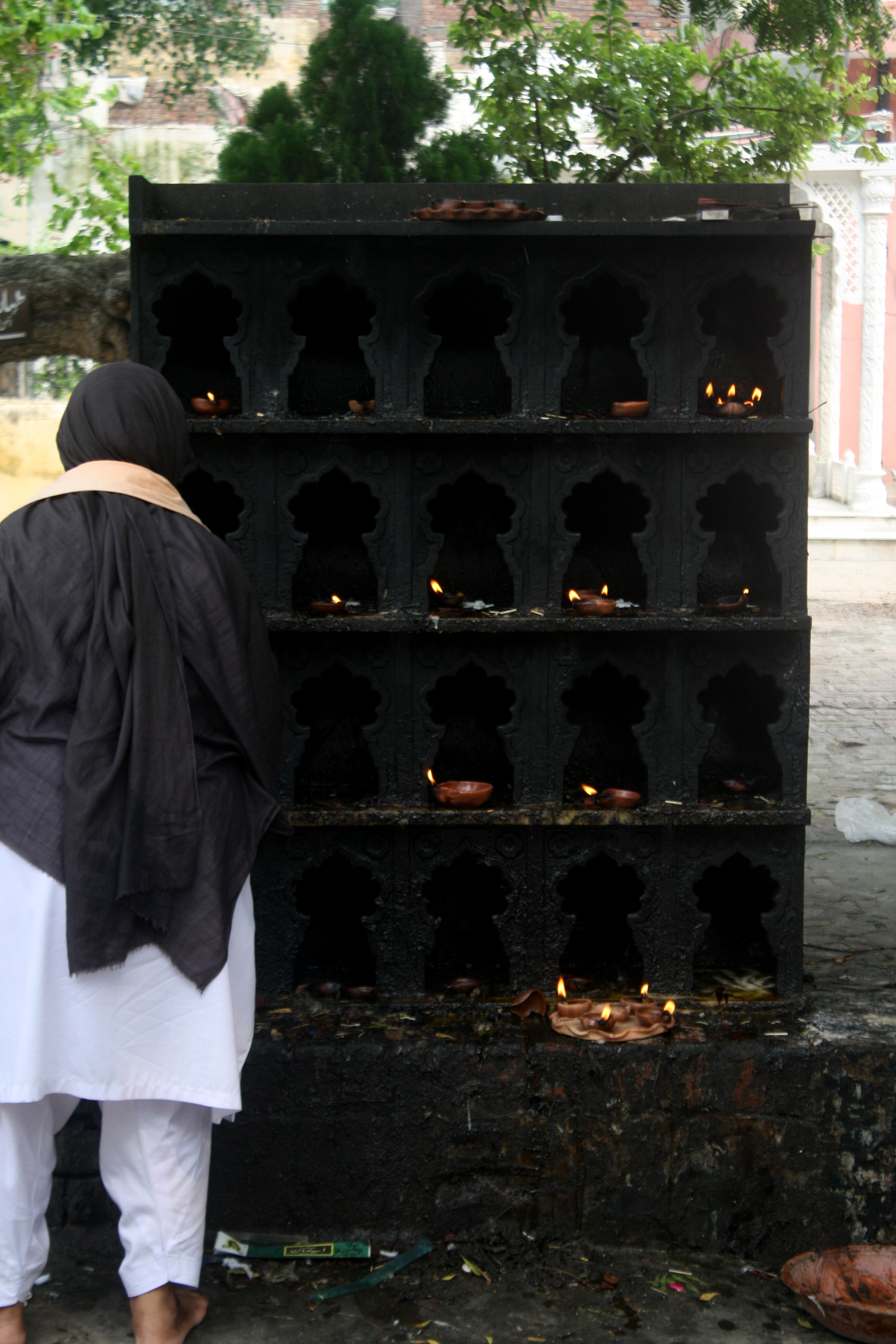
Numerous small cubicles are used for burning of oil lamps

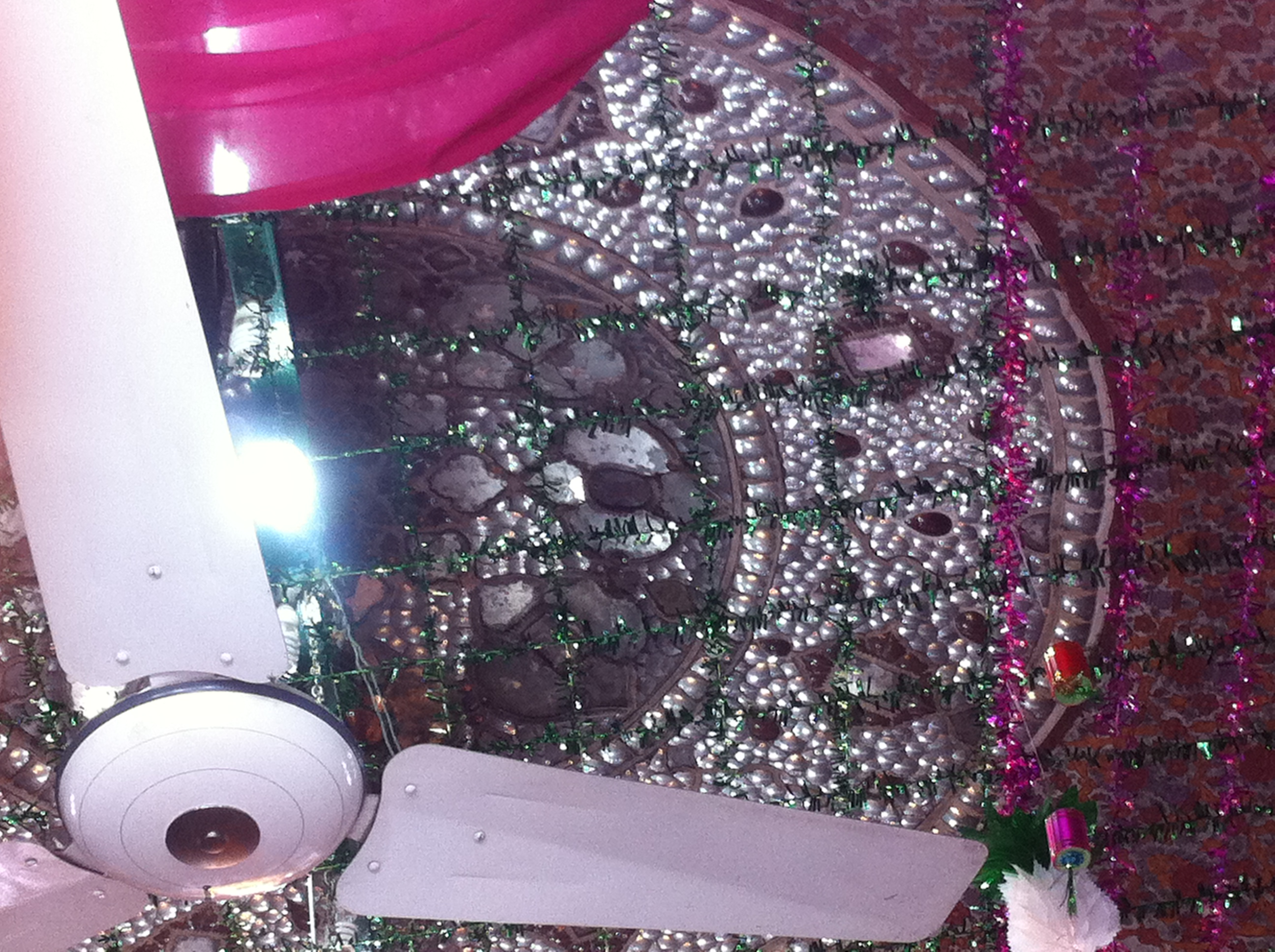
The underside of the shrine's dome is decorated with mirror work known as ayina kari
