= Prem Sangeet =

- Release date: 1943
- Country: India
- Language: Hindi

Prem Sangeet is a Bollywood film. It was released in 1943.

== Cast ==
- P. Jairaj
- Neena
