= Hajrah Begum =

Indian politician

General Secretary of the National Federation of Indian Women
- In office 1954–1962
- Preceded by: Post Created
- Succeeded by: Renu Chakravartty

Personal details
- Born: 1910
- Died: 20 January 2003 (aged 92–93)
- Party: Communist Party of India
- Spouse: Z.A. Ahmed
- Education: Montessori
- Alma mater: London
- Occupation: Politician

Hajrah Begum (1910-2003) was an Indian politician, leader of the Communist Party of India and the General Secretary of National Federation of Indian Women (NFIW) from 1954 to 1962.

Begum was born into a wealthy family in 1910. She grew up in Rampur. Her father was a magistrate in Meerut. Zohra Sehgal was her sister. Begum was married to her cousin, but soon divorced and returned to her father's house along with her infant son. During this period she became inspired by the Meerut Conspiracy Case, the judicial process against the Indian communist leadership.

In 1933 Begum went to Great Britain with her son, to study Montessori teaching course there. During her studies in Britain, she was one of the first Indians to join the Communist Party of Great Britain. She was part of the group of Indian Marxist students. She visited the Soviet Union in 1935. In 1935 Begum returned to India along with K.M. Ashraf, Z.A. Ahmed and Sajjad Zaheer. Upon returning to India, she married Z.A. Ahmed and both became full-time party cadres of the Communist Party of India. She became active in the Congress Socialist Party in Allahabad, where she organized railway coolies, press workers and peasants. She was part of a core group of young leaders of the CSP in Allahabad, along with Z.A. Ahmed, K.M. Ashraf and Rammanohar Lohia; all of whom except Lohia were also members of the underground CPI. At the time she was one of only a handful of female CPI members.

She became the organising secretary of the All India Women's Conference in 1940, and edited its Hindi-language organ Roshni. She was a frequent contributor to the weekly Qaumi Jang. She was imprisoned at Lucknow Jail for five months in 1949, and worked in the underground after her release.

She was a participant at the World Peace Conference in Vienna in 1952. Begum was one of the founders of the National Federation of Indian Women and former General Secretary from 1954 to 1962.

Begum had a daughter, Urdu theater director, Salima Raza, and a granddaughter, actress Ayesha Raza Mishra. Begum died on 20 January 2003, after a prolonged period of illness.
