= Sheikh Abdullah (educationalist) =

Indian educationalist, social reformer, lawyer (1874–1965)

- Sheikh Abdullah and his wife Waheed Jahan (right)
- Born: Thakur Das; June 21, 1874; Poonch, Jammu and Kashmir, British India
- Died: March 1965 (aged 90); Uttar Pradesh, India
- Education: BA; LL.B. Aligarh Muslim University
- Occupations: Educationalist; Social reformer; Lawyer
- Known for: Member of Aligarh Movement; Founder of Women's College, Aligarh; His contribution to the Muslim women education
- Spouse: Waheed Jahan Begum
- Children: Begum Khurshid Mirza; Rashid Jahan
- Father: Mehta Gurmukh Singh
- Relatives: Mehta Mastram (paternal grandfather); Hamida Saiduzzafar (daughter-in-law); Neena (daughter-in-law); Salman Haidar (grandson)
- Awards: Full list

Sheikh Abdullah (born Thakur Das; June 21, 1874 – March 1965), also known as Papa Mian, was an Indian educationalist, social reformer, lawyer, founder of Women's College, Aligarh and a member of the Executive Council of the Aligarh Muslim University who served to the post from 1920 to 1928. Later in 1902, he was appointed to the All India Muhammadan Educational Conference as a secretary for women's section. He is primarily known for his contribution to the Muslim women education during British India period.

The recipient of numerous accolades, including a Padma Bhushan, he also served a member of United Province Legislative Council, a legislature of United Provinces of British India. During his time at AMU, he was associated with the Aligarh Movement. He worked at several posts at AMU such as Honorary Treasurer and University's court member from 1920 until he died in 1965.

== Biography ==
He was born as Thakur Das to Mehta Gurmukh Singh on June 21, 1874, in Poonch district of Jammu and Kashmir. He originally belonged to Brahmin community of Kashmir. Das converted to Islam in 1891 after he went to Lahore for higher education. He married Waheed Jahan Begum (also known as Ala Bi), daughter of Mirza Mohammad Ibrahim in 1902, with whom he had six children, including five daughters and a son. One of his daughters, Mumtaz Jahan, served as Principal of the Women's College at Aligarh Muslim University for 30 years. Mehta Mastram, a lambardar of Bhantani village was his paternal grandfather. He was trained in Unani medicine by Hakeem Maulvi Nooruddin, a court physician to Maharaja of Kashmir. The physician was a member of the Ahmadiyya Muslim community, which Thakur Das also joined. Later when he went to United Province, he met with Sir Syed Ahmad Khan and adopted Sunni Islam, leaving the Ahmadiyya.

=== Education ===
He originally started his basic education with Persian and Sanskrit language from a Maktab in Poonch. He did his early schooling from an uncertain school in his village, and later he went to Jammu where he received further education. In 1891, Abdullah did matriculation in Lahore and then obtained Bachelor's of Arts and Bachelor of Laws from the Aligarh Muslim University.

== Awards and accolades ==
In 1935, British India awarded him with the honorary title of "Khan Bahadur". After completing his education from the Aligarh, the university awarded him a Doctor of Law, an honorary degree, in 1950. In 1964, eighteen years later of the partition of the Indian subcontinent, the government of India awarded him Padma Bhushan, the third-highest Indian civilian award, in recognition of his contribution to female education. The university's women's college, Abdullah College is named after him.

== Death and legacy ==
He died in Uttar Pradesh, India, in March 1965. His life is covered in a book titled Muslim Leadership and Women's Education in Uttar Pradesh, 1886–1947 written by Nasreen Ahmad.

The Abdullah School and Abdullah Hall, which comprise nine hostels for girls at AMU are named after him.

In 1975, a documentary titled Papa Miya of Aligarh, based on his life and directed by Khwaja Ahmad Abbas was released.

== Books ==
- Ahmed, N. (2012). Muslim Leadership and Women's Education: Uttar Pradesh, 1886-1947. Three Essays Collective. ISBN 978-81-88789-91-7.
