= Begum Khurshid Mirza =

Pakistani actress (1918-1989)

- بیگم خورشید مرزا
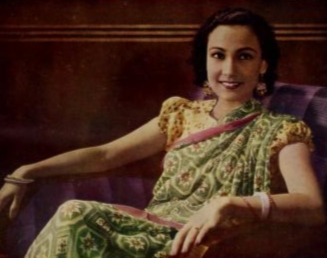
- Born: Khurshid Jahan; 4 March 1918; Aligarh, British India
- Died: 8 February 1989 (aged 70); Lahore, Pakistan
- Other name: Renuka Devi
- Education: Aligarh Muslim University
- Occupations: Actress; Singer
- Years active: 1937–1985
- Spouse: Akbar Mirza (m. 1934; died 1971)
- Children: 3
- Parent(s): Sheikh Abdullah (father); Waheed Jahan Begum (mother)
- Relatives: Rashid Jahan (sister); Hamida Saiduzzafar (sister-in-law); Salman Haidar (nephew); Neena (former sister-in-law)
- Awards: Pride of Performance Award by the Government of Pakistan (1984)

Begum Khurshid Mirza (Note: (Urdu: بیگم خورشید مرزا)) (born Khurshid Jahan; 4 March 1918 – 8 February 1989), also known by her screen name as Renuka Devi, was a Pakistani television and film actress, who had been active from the pre-partition era to the 1980s.

== Early life, family and education ==
Begum Khurshid Mirza was born as Khurshid Jahan on 4 March 1918 in Aligarh to Sheikh Abdullah and Waheed Jahan Begum, the founders of Women's College, Aligarh. Her father was a practising lawyer and philanthropist who was keen to bring education and enlightenment to Muslim women. Her elder sister Rashid Jahan was a prominent Urdu language writer and one of the founding members of the Progressive Writers' Movement. Mirza, at the age of 15, married on 11 February 1934, a police officer Akbar Mirza (1909 - 1971) and changed her name to Begum Khurshid Mirza. They had a daughter Shabnam (born December 1934) and Lubna (born 1936). The family later migrated to Pakistan in the wake of the partition of India in 1947. Mirza completed her education with a master's degree in English in 1963.

== Film career ==
Khurshid Mirza was introduced to Indian cinema by Devika Rani of Bombay Talkies under the screen name Renuka Devi. In her interview given to the Pakistani music and film archivist Lutfullah Khan, Mirza recalled Devika Rani named her after her own deceased sister.

She acted in Jeevan Prabhat (1937), Bhabhi (1938), Bhakti (1939), Bari Didi (1939) and Naya Sansar (1941), and performed as a leading lady in box-office hits Sahara (1943), Ghulami (1945) and Samrat Chandragupta (1945). She also sang for some of her movies.

She announced her retirement from the film industry in February 1945.

In 1963 she worked in Bengali film Nirjan Saikate, an adaptation of the novel by the same name from Bengali writer Samaresh Basu, and she won IFFI Best Actor Award (Female) at the 3rd IFFI.

== Filmography ==
=== British-Indian films ===
Year	Film	Role	Language
1937	Jeevan Prabhat		Hindi / Urdu
1938	Bhabhi	Renu	Hindi / Urdu
1939	Bhakti		Hindi / Urdu
1939	Bari Didi		Hindi / Urdu
1941	Naya Sansar	Asha	Hindi / Urdu
1943	Sahara		Hindi / Urdu
1945	Ghulami		Hindi / Urdu
1945	Samrat Chandragupta		Hindi / Urdu

=== Indian Films ===
Year	Film	Role	Language
1963	Nirjan Saikate		Bengali
1964	Natun Tirtha		Bengali

=== Pakistani Films ===
Year	Film	Role	Language
1972	Mohabbat		Urdu

== Television career ==
When Pakistan Television Corporation (PTV) began its broadcast transmission in 1964 and its TV drama serials started earning household fame, there was a need for professionals to train the young media crew. It was a Haseena Moin's serial, entitled Kiran Kahani (1973), which rediscovered Khurshid Mirza as a senior actress. Her performance gained her rave reviews, even though she said in a later interview that it was slightly off-key. The next serial she worked in was Zair, Zabar, Pesh, also written by Haseena Moin. Her performance was regarded by many as one of the finest acting performances in that role, and this set the tone for the rest of her acting career.

She remained a character actress for PTV, Karachi television centre and had nearly a dozen of popular drama series to her credit, including Uncle Urfi (1972), Parchhaiyan (1976) and a special play Massi Sherbate written by Fatima Surayya Bajia. She retired in 1985, with her last performance coming in PTV drama series Ana (1984).

=== PTV drama series ===
- Nazrana (1964)
- Uncle Urfi (1972)
- Kiran Kahani (1973)
- Zair, Zabar, Pesh (1974)
- Parchhaiyan (1976)
- Rumi
- Dhund
- Silver Jubilee
- Choti Choti Baatein
- Shama
- Afshan
- Ana (1984)
- Aagahi
- Massi Sherbate
- Show Shaa
- Panah
- Agar Nama Bar Milay

== Literary and art works ==
Begum Khurshid Mirza penned her autobiography The Uprooted Sappling, which appeared in the Pakistani weekly magazine SUN as a nine-part serial, from August 1982 to April 1983. Later, the collection was compiled in 2005 as a book by her daughter, Lubna Kazim

- A Woman of Substance: The Memoirs Of Begum Khurshid Mirza (an autobiography, edited by Lubna Kazim. Delhi: Zubaan 2005)

From 1960 onwards, she was involved in several literary activities, writing short stories for prestigious Urdu magazines Saqi published by Shahid Ahmad Dehlvi. Later, she compiled all her short stories with the cover title Mehru ki Bachee.

During her days in Quetta, Mirza ran the women's programme and wrote plays for Radio Pakistan. She also composed religious verses under the pseudonym Shola and sermons for Milad meetings.

== Social works ==
After migration to Pakistan, Khurshid Mirza worked for the All Pakistan Women's Association (APWA) as a volunteer helping destitute women. When her husband was transferred to Quetta, she took charge of the All Pakistan Women's Association (APWA) centre in a rural area called Ismail Killi. She had also aired programmes on women's issues on radio.

== Awards and recognition ==
- (International Film Festival of India) IFFI Best Actor Award (Female) (1965) for "Nirjan Saikate" at 3rd International Film Festival of India
- Pride of Performance award by the President of Pakistan in 1984 for her contributions to films and television.

She got PTV Best Actress Award in the PTV play Afshan in 1982.

- In 2004, an event was arranged to pay tributes to Begum Khurshid Mirza in Lahore, where many Pakistani dignitaries gathered to recall her efforts for the tribal women during her stay in Quetta in the 1950s where she also used to hold events to raise funds for All Pakistan Women's Association (APWA).

== Death ==
After her retirement, Mirza moved to Lahore, where she died on 8 February 1989. She was buried in Mian Mir graveyard in Lahore, Pakistan.
