= Rashid Jahan =

Indian writer and medical doctor

- Born: 25 August 1905; Aligarh, United Provinces of Agra and Oudh, India
- Died: 29 July 1952 (aged 46); Moscow, Soviet Union
- Resting place: Moscow, Russia
- Education: Isabella Thoburn College, Lady Hardinge Medical College
- Occupations: Writer, gynecologist
- Spouse: Mahmuduz Zafar
- Relatives: Sheikh Abdullah (father); Waheed Jahan Begum (mother); Begum Khurshid Mirza (sister); Hamida Saiduzzafar (sister-in-law); Neena (sister-in-law); Salman Haidar (nephew)
- Writing career
- Language: Urdu
- Genres: Short stories, plays
- Notable work: Angarey
- Literary movement: Progressive Writers Movement

Rashid Jahan (25 August 1905 – 29 July 1952) was an Indian writer and medical doctor known for her Urdu literature and trenchant social commentaries. She wrote short stories and plays and contributed to Angarey (1932), a collection of unconventional short stories written in collaboration with Sajjad Zaheer, Ahmed Ali, and Mahmuduz Zafar.

Jahan was an active member of the Progressive Writers' Movement and the Indian People's Theatre Association. She has been called one of the first ever feminists and was a leading Indian communist. These two schools of thought animated Jahan's life and literary output.

== Biography ==
=== Early life ===
Rashid Jahan was born on 25 August 1905 in Aligarh. She was the eldest of seven children born to Sheikh Abdullah and his wife Waheed Jahan Begum. Her father was a leading pioneer of women's English-based education in India and established the Women's College, Aligarh at the Aligarh Muslim University. Sheikh Abdullah also ran the Urdu literary journal Khatun, which promoted women's emancipation and education, and to which Jahan's mother was a frequent contributor. As Jahan's future sister-in-law, Hamida Saiduzzafar, related in a 1973 interview, Rashid once said of her upbringing: ‘‘We have slept on the mattress of women's education and covered ourselves with the quilt of women's education from our earliest consciousness."

=== Education ===
Jahan undertook her early education in Aligarh at the Muslim Girls' School and Hostel (which would later become the Women's College, Aligarh), where she studied until she was 16 years old. In 1921, she left Aligarh to join the Isabella Thoburn College in Lucknow, earning a degree in Inter-Science. Jahan wrote her first short stories for the Chand Bagh Chronicle, a publication of the Isabella Thoburn College. Three years later, in 1924, Jahan moved to Lady Hardinge Medical College in Delhi to study obstetrics and gynecology. As a medical student, Jahan organized literacy classes and free medical clinics for poor women. After graduating with an M.B.B.S. in 1929, Jahan joined the United Provinces Provincial Medical Service, and was posted to small towns across north India, from Bahraich to Bulandshahar and Meerut.

=== Activism ===
In 1931, Jahan was posted to the Lady Dufferin Hospital (now the Dufferin Hospital) in Lucknow, the capital city of the United Provinces. In Lucknow, Jahan met Sajjad Zaheer, Ahmed Ali, and Mahmuduz Zafar. The following year, the quartet published Angaaray, a collection of short stories railing against the hypocrisies of Islamic orthodoxy and the British Raj. In 1933, Jahan joined the Communist Party of India and became a leading party figure in the United Provinces, adopting the moniker "Comrade Rashid Jahan."

In October 1934, Jahan married Angaaray collaborator and noted Communist Mahmuduz Zafar. Jahan resigned from the United Provinces medical service and joined Zafar in Amritsar soon after. In 1935 and 1936, Jahan was intimately involved in the founding of the Progressive Writers' Association, organizing the First Progressive Writers' Conference in Lucknow during the April of 1936. In 1937, Jahan moved once again, this time to Dehradun, where she continued to be an active member of the Communist Party of India while working as a gynecologist and serving as the editor of the Communist newspaper-cum-literary journal Chingari. In early 1937, Jahan published a collection of plays and short stories entitled Aurat. In the summer of the same year, Jahan travelled to Vienna to seek medical aid for a thyroid problem.

Jahan's political, literary, and medical careers often intersected as she pursued wide-ranging feminist and socialist agendas in the 1930s. Jahan "offered women’s healthcare in lower caste and class communities, educated women in reproductive health and marriage rape in sweepers colonies, held adult education classes, ran her own gynecological medical practice, participated in trade union rallies and protest marches, [...] and authored and orchestrated political street theater." Jahan's younger sister, Begum Khurshid Mirza, writes that Jahan "worked day and night, and most of her earnings went to the [Communist] party fund," from which she and her husband received a small sustenance allowance. Mirza further relates that Jahan became a sort of mother-figure for all the poor comrades and their families. According to Salman Haidar, Jahan's nephew and former Foreign Secretary of India, Jahan was so extensively involved with Communist organizing that she was regularly followed by plainclothes policemen. Jahan's organizing activities continued until March 1949, when she was jailed for three months for participating in a strike that paralyzed the United Provinces railway system. Jahan was released in May 1949 after participating in a hunger strike with her fellow prisoners, but cancer caused Jahan's health to deteriorate by early 1950 and made Jahan unable to continue her lifelong activist projects.

=== Death ===
On 2 July 1952, Jahan and her husband left India for the Soviet Union to seek treatment for Jahan's uterine cancer. Jahan was admitted to the Kremlin Hospital but died on 29 July 1952, soon after arriving. Jahan is buried in a Moscow cemetery, where her tombstone reads, "Communist Doctor and Writer."

== Literary output ==
It is thought that Jahan wrote approximately 25-30 original short stories and 15-20 original plays in her lifetime. Two of these short stories appear in Angaaray and six appear in Aurat, while the rest have been lost to time for reasons of obscurity or limited initial circulation. The plays Jahan wrote were intended for radio, and were generally aired on All India Radio during her lifetime.

Jahan also produced a number of translations of English, Russian, and Chinese short stories—among them works by Anton Chekov, Maxim Gorky, and James Joyce—and dramatized short stories written by other Urdu authors, such as Premchand.

Jahan's writings have appeared in Woh aur Dusre Afsane wa Drame (Maktaba Jamia, 1977) and A Rebel and Her Cause (Rakshanda Jalil, 2014).

=== Angaaray ===
Published in December 1932 by Nizami Press, Angaaray (translated alternatively as "Embers" or "Burning Coals") was a volume of 10 short stories written by Sajjad Zaheer, Ahmed Ali, Rashid Jahan, and Mahmuduz Zafar. Zaheer contributed 5 short stories to the collection, Ali two, Jahan two, and Zafar one. The two pieces that Jahan contributed to Angaaray were Dilli ki Sair ("A Trip to Delhi") and Parde ke Peeche ("Behind the Veil").

Dilli ki Sair is a three page monologue told from the perspective of a Muslim woman, Malika Begum of Faridabad, who is telling her friends about her trip to Delhi with her husband. However, as her husband left her at the train station to meet one of his friends, the story largely consists of the narrator relating the happenings on the railway platform as she sits on her luggage, starving, and waiting for her husband to take her home. When her husband does return, he offers her a puri, leftovers from his meal in a restaurant, and becomes angry when she refuses. The narrator concludes her story by declaring that she would not want to take a trip even to paradise with her husband. As such, the story is considered to be a brief but penetrating meditation on life behind the veil and the blindness of male privilege towards the experience of women behind the purdah.

Parde ke Peeche is a conversation between two women from affluent, sharif families. One of the women, Muhammadi Begum, has become sick due to multiple pregnancies, having given birth to a daughter every year that she has been married to her husband, who insists on a male heir. Her husband forces her to go through several operations on her sexual organs to make her more attractive and more capable of producing a boy, but Aftab Begum, Muhammadi's sister-in-law and interlocutor, eventually secures the services of a female doctor. This doctor warns Begum's husband that the continuous pregnancies are weakening the health of Muhammadi and suggests that the couple use birth control. This suggestion is clearly ignored, however, as by the end of the story, Begum has finally given birth to a boy, who is shown to mistreat his many elder sisters in the closing scene.

==== Controversy ====
Angaaray railed against social inequity, hypocritical Mawlawis, and the exploitation of women in a deeply patriarchal society. These criticisms caused an uproar in the Indian Islamic community, and Angaaray was publicly condemned by the Central Standing Committee of the All-India Shia Conference in Lucknow as a "filthy pamphlet" that had "wounded the feelings of the entire Muslim community." Fatwas were issued against the book and the Urdu press called for its proscription. Demonstrations were held outside book stores and the publisher had to issue a written apology and surrender unsold copies to the government. In March 1933, the British colonial government banned the book for violating religious freedoms under Section 295A of the Indian Penal Code. The outcry was so severe that only five copies from the original press run still exist.

=== Aurat ===
Aurat was a 1937 collection of six short stories and the titular play written by Rashid Jahan. A second edition was published posthumously in 1963 at the behest of Jahan's father, Sheikh Abdullah.

== Bibliography ==
The literary works of Jahan include.

- Angarey (Nizami Press, Lucknow, 1932)
  - Dilli ki Sair
  - Parde ke peeche
- Aurat aur digar afsane (Hashmi Book Depot, Lahore, 1937): collection of a play and six short stories
  - Aurat
  - Mera ek safar
  - Sadak
  - Pun
  - Istakshara
  - Garibon ka Bhagvan
  - Salma
- Gosha-e-'afiyat (Corner of Prosperity), radio play produced in 1948
- Sh'ula-e jvala (India Publisher, Lucknow, 1974) published posthumously under the editorship Dr. Hamida Saiduzzafar, and Naeem Khan
  - Iftari
  - Woh
  - Sauda
  - Asif Jahan ki Bahu
  - Chidda ki Ma
  - Andhe ki lathi

== Legacy ==
In 1975, a memorial was held at the Ghalib Academy in New Delhi for the 70th anniversary of Jahan's birth. The event was attended by a number of prominent Urdu and Hindi writers as well as numerous government officials.

In 2004, Aligarh Muslim University stymied a proposed observance of Rashid Jahan's centenary, fearing that "it would provoke political agitation."

Jahan's younger sister, Begum Khurshid Mirza (1918 – 1989), was a noted film actress in British India in the 1930s and 1940s, and later was an accomplished TV actress in Pakistan. Mirza's memoir was published in English in 2005 and includes a chapter on Rashid Jahan (pp. 86–104, A Woman of Substance: The Memoirs of Begum Khurshid Mirza, New Delhi: Zubaan, 2005).
