= Zohra Sehgal =

Indian actress and choreographer (1912–2014)

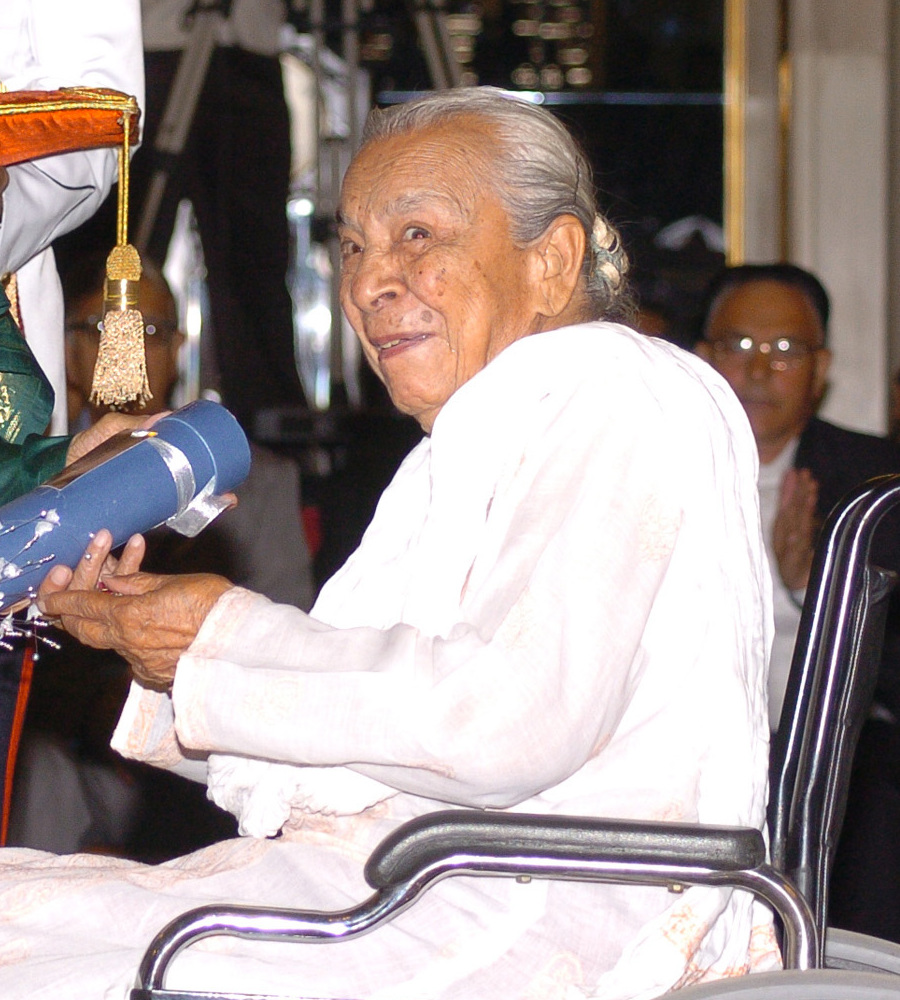
- Sehgal in 2010
- Born: Sahibzadi Zohra Mumtazullah Khan Begum; 27 April 1912; Saharanpur, United Provinces of Agra and Oudh
- Died: 10 July 2014 (aged 102); New Delhi, India
- Occupations: Actress, dancer, choreographer
- Years active: 1935–2007
- Spouse: Kameshwar Nath Segal (m. 1942; died 1959)
- Children: 2, including Kiran Segal and Pavan Segal
- Relatives: See Mumtazullah Khan family
- Awards: Padma Shri (1998); Padma Vibhushan (2010)

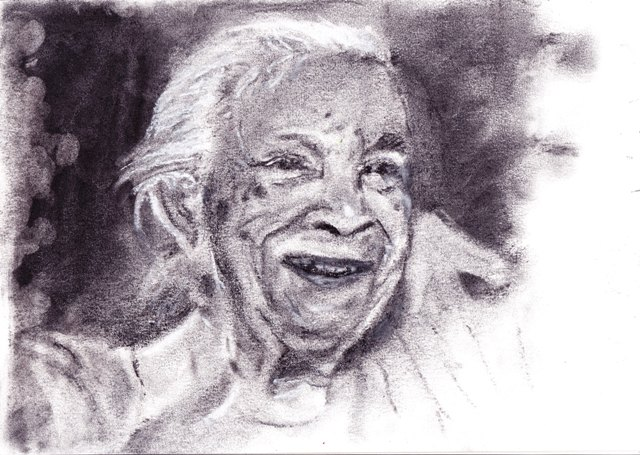
Actress and Dance Choreographer of repute, Charcoal on Paper by Amitabh Mitra

Zohra Mumtaz Sehgal (born Sahibzadi Zohra Mumtazullah Khan Begum; 27 April 1912 – 10 July 2014) was an Indian actress, dancer, and choreographer. Having begun her career as a member of a contemporary dance troupe, she transitioned into acting roles beginning in the 1940s. Sehgal appeared in several British films, television shows, and Bollywood productions in a career that spanned over eight decades.

Sehgal's most notable films include Neecha Nagar, Afsar (1946), Bhaji on the Beach (1992), The Mystic Masseur (2001), Bend It Like Beckham (2002), Dil Se.. (1998), Saaya (2003), Veer-Zaara (2004) Saawariya and Cheeni Kum (2007); and the TV serials The Jewel in the Crown (1984), Tandoori Nights (1985–87) and Amma and Family (1996). At the age of 90, she played the central character in the 2002 film Chalo Ishq Ladaaye. Considered the doyenne of Indian theatre, she acted with the Indian People's Theatre Association (IPTA) and Prithviraj Kapoor's Prithvi Theatre for 14 years.

Sehgal was awarded the Padma Shri in 1998, Kalidas Samman in 2001, and in 2004 the Sangeet Natak Akademi (India's National Academy for Music, Dance and Drama) presented her with its highest award, the Sangeet Natak Akademi Fellowship for lifetime achievement. She received the Padma Vibhushan, India's second-highest civilian honour, in 2010. She died in a New Delhi hospital on 10 July 2014 due to cardiac arrest.

== Early life and family ==
Zohra Begum Mumtazullah Khan was born on 27 April 1912 in Rampur, United Provinces, British India, to Mumtazullah Khan and Natiqua Begum. She was raised in a traditional Muslim household in Chakrata (present-day Uttarakhand) and was the fourth of seven children—Zakullah, Hajrah, Ikramullah, Uzra Butt, Amina and Sabra. Sehgal described herself as a tomboy, who enjoyed climbing trees and playing outdoor games. She lost vision in her left eye when she contracted glaucoma at the age of one. She was referred to a hospital in Birmingham where she was treated at a cost of £300.

Following the death of her mother at an early age, Sehgal and her sisters were enrolled at the Queen Mary College, Lahore. Strict purdah was observed at the institute, and men invited to give lectures and seminars were only allowed to do so from behind a screen. Having witnessed her sister's failed marriage, Sehgal decided against getting married herself. Upon graduating, her maternal uncle, Sahebzada Saeeduzzafar Khan, who was based in Edinburgh, arranged for her to apprentice under a British actor. They started from Lahore by car and, en route, crossed Iran and Palestine, before reaching Damascus, Syria, where she met her cousin. Then they travelled into Egypt and caught a boat to Europe in Alexandria.

In Europe, Sehgal's aunt encouraged her to enrol in Mary Wigman's ballet school in Dresden, Germany. Sehgal passed the entrance test without much prior experience in the dance form, and became the first Indian to study at the institution. She stayed in Dresden for the next three years studying modern dance, while living in the house of Countess Liebenstein. A significant turning point came in her life when she met Uday Shankar at a performance of the Shiv-Parvati ballet, which he had choreographed. Shankar promised her a job on her return to India at the completion of her course.

== Career ==
Shankar contacted Sehgal through a telegram, saying, "Leaving for Japan tour. Can you join immediately?" Following that, Sehgal joined his troupe in August 1935. The group toured Japan, Egypt, and several parts of Europe and the United States. Sehgal soon established herself as the lead dancer of the troupe, along with Simkin, a French national. On their return to India in 1940, Sehgal became a teacher at the Uday Shankar India Cultural Centre at Almora. It was here that she met her future husband Kameshwar Sehgal, a young scientist, painter and dancer from Indore, eight years her junior, belonging to the Radha Soami sect.

The two continued to work at the Cultural Centre and established themselves as leading choreographers. During their time in Almora, Kameshwar Sehgal composed a noted ballet for human puppets and choreographed the ballet Lotus Dance. The duo later migrated to Lahore, where they set up their own dance academy, the Zohresh Dance Institute. Following the communal tension preceding the Partition of India, they moved to Bombay, with their one-year-old daughter, Kiran. Sehgal joined the Prithvi Theatre (where her sister, Uzra Butt also worked) in 1945, as an actress with a monthly salary of Rs 400, and toured across India with the group.

Also in 1945, Sehgal joined the theatre group, Indian People's Theatre Association (IPTA), acted in several plays, and made her film debut in IPTA's first film production, directed by Khwaja Ahmad Abbas, Dharti Ke Lal in 1946; she followed it up with another IPTA-supported film, Neecha Nagar. Directed by Chetan Anand and starring Rafiq Ahmed and Uma Anand, Neecha Nagar was one of the first projects of the parallel cinema movement in the subcontinent. Upon release, the film became a critical success and was screened as such international film festivals as Cannes Film Festival, where it won the Palme d'Or.

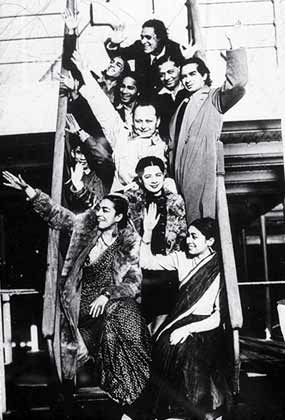
Zohra Segal and Uzra Butt, part of the Uday Shankar Ballet Troupe, ca 1935–37.

During her stay in Bombay, Sehgal became friends with several theatre and film personalities. She continued her association with theatre, appearing in successful productions including Ebrahim Alkazi's Din Ke Andhere (portraying Begum Qudsia) and K.A. Abbas's stage productions for IPTA. She lived in a rented house owned by Chetan and Uma Anand. She also worked as a choreographer for Hindi films, including Guru Dutt's Baazi and Raj Kapoor's Awaara (both 1951).

After her husband's death in 1959, Sehgal moved to Delhi and was appointed as the director of the newly founded Natya Academy. She worked in the same position for about three years. Later in 1962, Sehgal was awarded a drama scholarship, which required her to move to London, United Kingdom. She briefly worked as a dance instructor at a Chelsea-based school run by Bharatanatyam dancer Ram Gopal. Following that, Sehgal made her television debut with a BBC adaptation of a Kipling story The Rescue of Pluffles, in 1964. She went on to appear in three episodes of the science fiction fantasy series Doctor Who in 1964 and 1965; the episodes that Sehgal worked in, however, are currently lost. She also anchored 26 episodes of BBC TV series, Padosi (Neighbours; 1976–77).

Sehgal's first film role came in 1982, when she was signed by Merchant Ivory Productions. She appeared in the James Ivory-directed The Courtesans of Bombay, which released later that year. This paved the way for an important role as Lady Chatterjee in the television adaptation of The Jewel in the Crown (ITV, 1984). She continued to make sporadic appearances in British films for the next few years, most notably in such productions as The Raj Quartet, The Jewel in the Crown, Tandoori Nights, and My Beautiful Laundrette.

=== Return to India ===
Sehgal returned to India in the mid-1990s and lived for a few months in Burdwan. At that time she acted in several films, plays and TV series. She first performed poetry at a memorial to Uday Shankar organised by his brother, Ravi Shankar in 1983, and soon took to it in big way; she started getting invited to perform poetry at various occasions. She even travelled to Pakistan to recite verses for "An Evening With Zohra Sehgal". Her impromptu performances of Punjabi and Urdu became a norm. After stage performances she was often requested by the audience to recite Hafeez Jullundhri's famous nazm, Abhi To Main Jawan Hoon.

In 1993, the critically acclaimed play Ek Thi Nani was staged in Lahore for the first time, featuring Zohra and her sister Uzra Butt (who was now staying in Pakistan). A performance of its English version A Granny for All Seasons was held at UCLA in 2001. She became very active in Hindi films in grandmotherly roles from 1996, with frequent appearances in high budget movies such as Dil Se, Hum Dil De Chuke Sanam, Veer Zara, Saawariya and Cheeni Kum. She was 90 when she did the film Chalo Ishq Ladaye in 2002, where she was the central character of the film and Govinda played her grandson. The film Ishq Ladaye had her riding a bike and fighting the villains as well. In 2008, at the United Nations Population Fund (UNPF)-Laadli Media Awards in New Delhi, she was named Laadli of the Century, and the award ceremony was presided by the then Chief Minister of Delhi, Sheila Dikshit.

== Personal life ==
Sehgal married Kameshwar Sehgal, a Hindu, despite some initial reluctance from her father. The ceremony was held on 14 August 1942; Jawaharlal Nehru was to attend the wedding reception, but he was arrested a couple of days earlier for supporting Gandhi's Quit India Movement.

Sehgal had two children; Kiran Segal, who is an Odissi dancer and Pavan Sehgal, who works for the WHO. Kiran Segal, wrote her mother's biography titled Zohra Sehgal: Fatty, which was released in 2012.

== Death ==
On 9 July 2014 she was admitted to the Max Hospital in South Delhi after being diagnosed with pneumonia. She died on 10 July 2014, aged 102, after suffering cardiac arrest. Prime Minister Narendra Modi paid tribute to Sehgal on Twitter, describing her as "prolific & full of life," and adding that she "made a mark through her acting which is admired across generations." Also paying tribute, Amitabh Bachchan tweeted that Sehgal was "immensely lovable".

Sehgal was cremated on 11 July at Lodhi Road crematorium, Delhi.

== Filmography ==
=== Acting ===
Year	Title	Role	Notes
1935	Romantic India		
1943	Rahgeer		
1946	Neecha Nagar	Bhabi	
1946	Dharti Ke Lal		
1950	Afsar		
1953	Fareb		
1956	Heer		
1957	Paisa		
1964	The Indian Tales of Rudyard Kipling	Fareda / Ameera's mother / Ayah / Mrs. Hauksbee's Ayah	5 episodes
1964	Doctor Who	Attendant on Ping-Cho	Uncredited; 2 episodes; serial: Marco Polo
1965	Doctor Who	Sheyrah	Episode: "The Knight of Jaffa"
1967	The Long Duel	Devi	
1967	Theatre 625	Amma	Episode: "55 Columns"
1968	The Vengeance of She	Putri	
1968	The Expert	Mrs. Singh	Episode: "Miss Daley"
1969	The Guru	Mastani	
1973	The Regiment	Nanni Ji	Episode: "Women"
1973	Tales That Witness Madness	Malia	(segment "Luau")
1974	It Ain't Half Hot Mum	Rangi's Mother-in-Law	Episode: "The Road to Bannu"
1978	Mind Your Language	Mrs. Singh	Episode: "Many Happy Returns"
1983	The Courtesans of Bombay	Maria	
1984	The Jewel in the Crown	Lili Chatterjee	2 episodes
1985	Tandoori Nights		
1985	Harem	Affaf	
1986	Caravaggio	Jerusaleme's Grandmother	
1987	Partition		
1987	Never Say Die	Gajmukhi	4 episodes
1989	Manika, une vie plus tard	Mère de Ranjit	
1989	The Bill	Mrs. Gunn	2 episodes
1991	Masala	Grandma	
1990	Mulla Nasiruddin	Old Woman / Story Teller	TV Mini-Series
1992–1994	Firm Friends	Suvira Bhatia	8 episodes
1993	Bhaji on the Beach	Pushpa	
1994	Little Napoleons	Jayaben Shah	3 episodes
1995	Amma and Family	Amma	TV series
1995	Ek Tha Rusty		TV series
1998	Tamanna	Mrs. Chopra	
1998	Dil Se..	Grandmother	
1998	Not a Nice Man to Know	Guest	TV series
1999	Hum Dil De Chuke Sanam	Dadi	
1999	Dillagi	Ranvir's Grand Mother	
1999	Khwaish	Aapa	TV series
2000	Tera Jadoo Chal Gayaa	Elderly Lady	(in song "Agre Mein Hai Mashoor")
2001	Zindagi Kitni Khoobsoorat Hai	Dadi	TV series
2001	The Mystic Masseur	Auntie	
2001	Landmark	Gran	Short
2002	Bend It Like Beckham	Biji	
2002	Anita and Me	Nanima	
2002	Chalo Ishq Ladaaye	Dadi	
2003	Saaya	Sister Martha	
2003	Kal Ho Naa Ho		
2004	Kaun Hai Jo Sapno Mein Aaya?		
2004	Veer-Zaara	Bebe	
2005	Chicken Tikka Masala	Grandmother	
2005	The Mistress of Spices	First Mother	
2007	Cheeni Kum	Mrs. Gupta	
2007	Saawariya	Lilian Ji aka Lilipop	(final film role)

== Awards ==
- 1963 Sangeet Natak Akademi Award
- 1998: Padma Shri
- 2001: Kalidas Samman
- 2002: Padma Bhushan
- 2004: Sangeet Natak Akademi Fellowship
- 2010: Padma Vibhushan

== Popular recognition ==
On 29 September 2020, Google commemorated the anniversary of the release of her 1946 film, Neecha Nagar, (on this day, the film released at the Cannes International Film Festival), with a Doodle. The accompanying write-up says, "Among Sehgal’s notable early work was a role in the film “Neecha Nagar“ ("Lowly City"), which was released on this day in 1946 at the Cannes Film Festival. Widely considered Indian cinema's first international critical success, "Neecha Nagar" won the festival's highest honour: the Palme d’Or prize."
